= 2026 Irvine elections =

Municipal elections in Irvine, California

- November 3, 2026

4 out of 7 seats on the City Council 4 seats needed for a majority
Party	Democratic	Republican
Current seats	5	2
Seats needed	Steady	▲2
- Party Gains: Democratic hold (Note: While District 6 remained vacant under Measure D, the measure treated at-large incumbents residing in District 5 and 6 as districted incumbents if a vacancy were to occur. At-large councilmember Kathleen Treseder resides in District 6 and is being reflected here as a "Democratic incumbent".) No election

The 2026 Irvine elections were held on November 3, 2026, to elect municipal officials in Irvine, California. Four of the seven seats were up for election on the Irvine City Council. In addition to municipal offices, voters decided on Measure D, a proposed charter amendment to adopt ranked-choice voting for city elections.

Municipal elections in California are officially nonpartisan; candidates’ party affiliations do not appear on the ballot.

== Mayor ==
Incumbent mayor Larry Agran was elected mayor of Irvine in 2024, defeating a field of challengers and is eligible for re-election in 2026.

=== Results ===
2026 Irvine mayoral election
Candidate	Votes	%
Larry Agran (incumbent)	56,666	69.9
Maksim V. Egorov	24,428	30.1
Total votes	81,094	100.0
Invalid or blank votes	14,790	15.4

== City council ==
=== District 1 ===
2026 Irvine City Council District 1 election
- November 5, 2026
- Turnout: 56.0%
- Reporting: 99% as of November 19, 5:00 PM PT
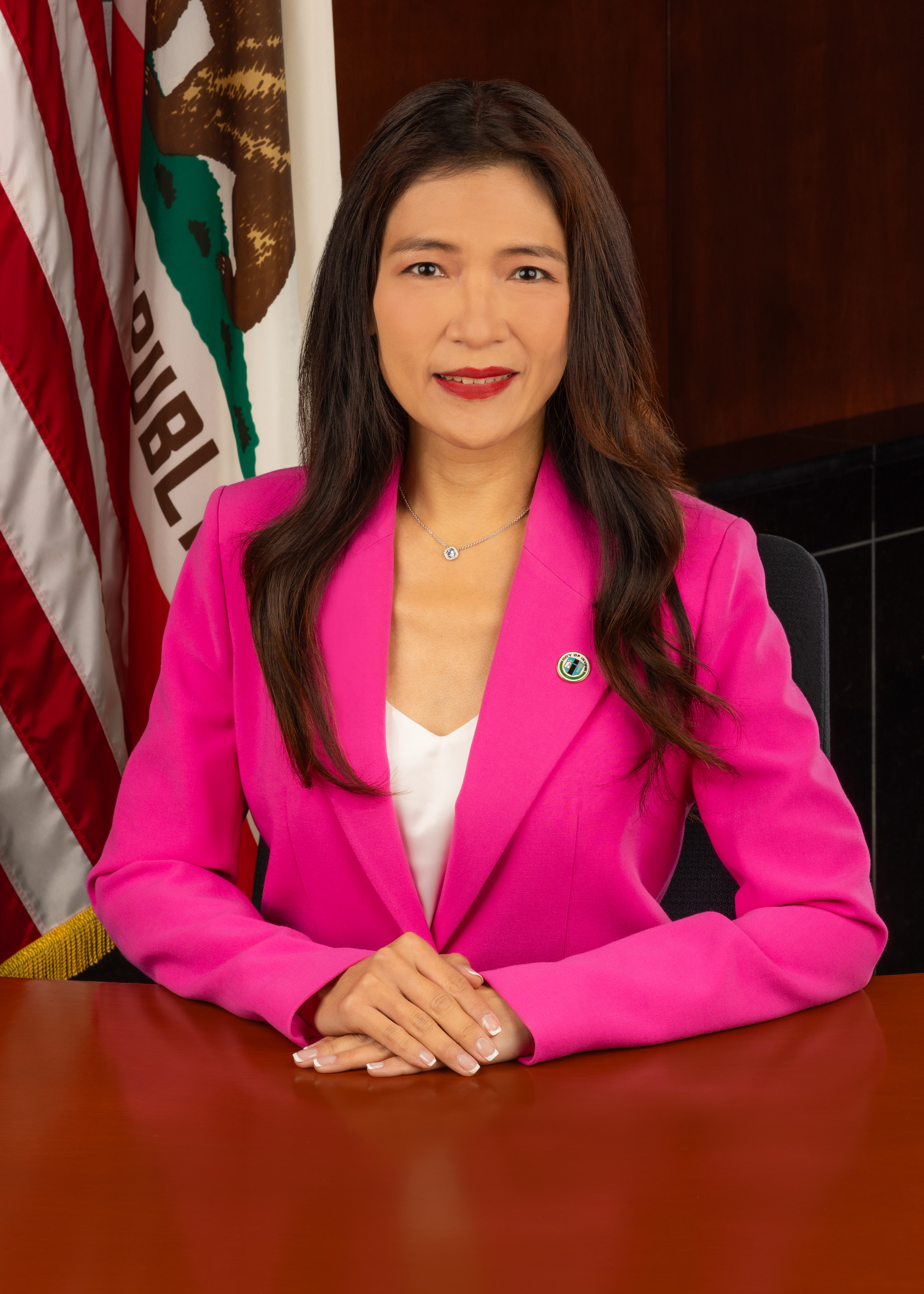

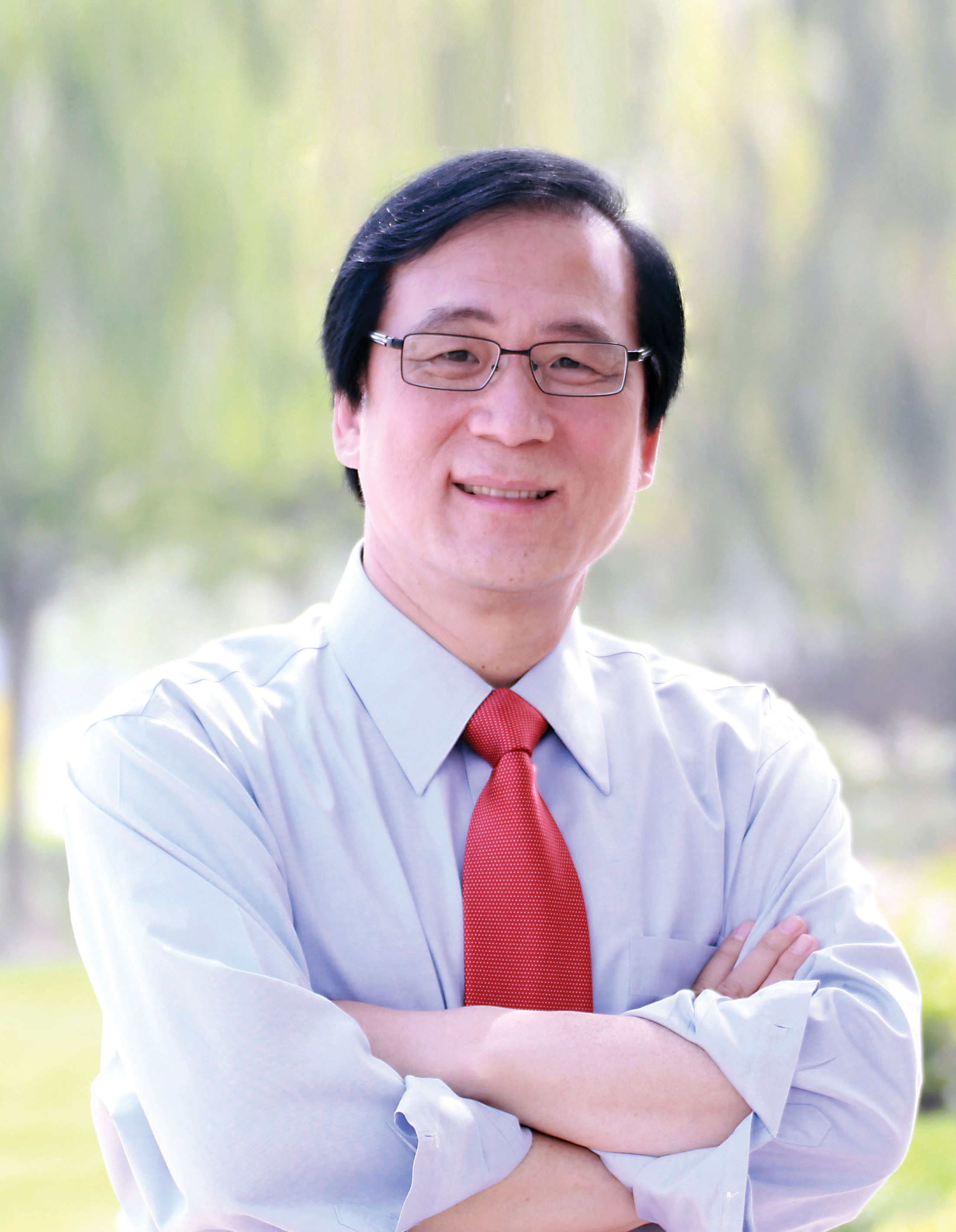
Candidate	Melinda Liu	John Park	Sukhee Kang
Popular vote	5,796	5,407	3,135
Percentage	40.4%	37.7%	21.9%
City Councilmember before election
Melinda Liu
City Councilmember
Melinda Liu

District 1 covers north Irvine, including Orchard Hills, West Irvine, Northpark, Stonegate, and parts of Northwood.The incumbent is Melinda Liu, who was first elected in 2024 to a short term after defeating John Park.

==== Candidates ====
- Melinda Liu (Democratic), incumbent Irvine city councilmember, serving a short term
- Sukhee Kang (Democratic), Former Mayor of Irvine
- John Park (Republican), Vice Chair of the California Republican Party, Irvine Finance Comissioner and perennial candidate

==== Fundraising ====
Campaign finance reports as of September 19, 2026 (Note: Raised and spent figures reflect campaign activity during calendar year 2025 and 2026 only and do not include prior periods.)
Candidate	Raised	Spent	Cash on hand
Melinda Liu (D)	$233,018	$33,109	$83,264
Sukhee Kang (D)	$154,730	$35,338	$120,101
John Park (R)	$21,440	$8,657	$12,783
Source: City of Irvine

=== District 5 ===
2026 Irvine City Council District 5 election
- November 5, 2026
- Turnout: 61.3%
- Reporting: 99% as of November 19, 5:00 PM PT
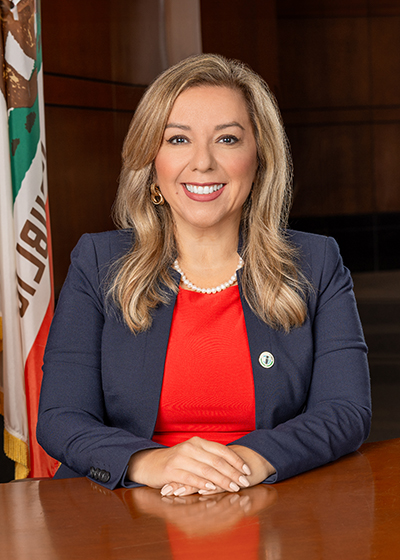

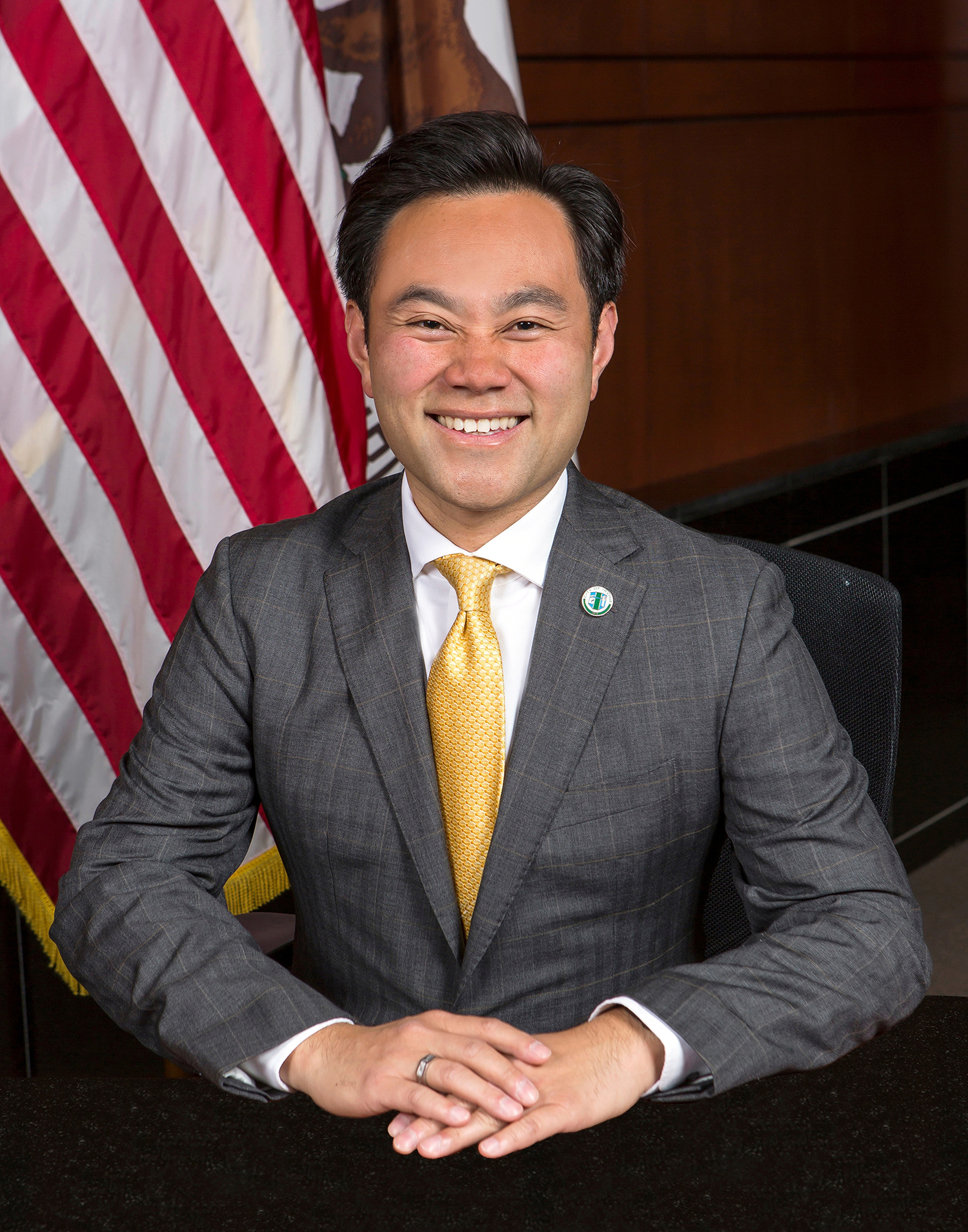
Candidate	Betty Martinez Franco	Anthony Kuo	Steven Alves
Popular vote	5,350	4,050	3,687
Percentage	34.9%	26.5%	24.1%
Candidate	Byron Salvatierra	Julie Glossbrenner
Popular vote	1,453	767
Percentage	9.5%	5.0%
City Councilmember before election
Betty Martinez Franco
City Councilmember
Betty Martinez Franco

District 5 includes the neighborhoods of Rancho San Joaquin, University Park, Westpark, and Woodbridge. The incumbent is Betty Martinez Franco, who was first elected in 2025 to a short term after defeating former councilmember Anthony Kuo.

==== Candidates ====
- Steven Alves (Republican), Chief of Staff to Irvine Councilmember James Mai
- Betty Martinez Franco (Democratic), incumbent Irvine City Councilmember, serving a short term
- Julie Glossbrenner, (NPP), Housing Specialist
- Anthony Kuo (Republican), former Irvine City Councilmember, Irvine Finance Commission member
- Byron Salvatierra (Democratic), Iraq War Army Veteran and cybersecurity manager

==== Fundraising ====
Campaign finance reports as of September 19, 2026 (Note: Raised and spent figures reflect campaign activity during calendar year 2025 and 2026 only and do not include prior periods.)
Candidate	Raised	Spent	Cash on hand
Byron Salvatierra (D)	$46,586	$18,148	$17,440
Betty Martinez Franco (D)	$52,377	$21,740	$31,786
Anthony Kuo (R)	$12,676	$6,263	$6,413
Steven C. Alves (R)	$12,274	$3,431	$8,843
Julie Glossbrenner (NPP)	$0	$0	$0
Source: City of Irvine

=== District 6 ===
2026 Irvine City Council District 1 election
- November 5, 2026
- Turnout: 61.6%
- Reporting: 99% as of November 19, 5:00 PM PT
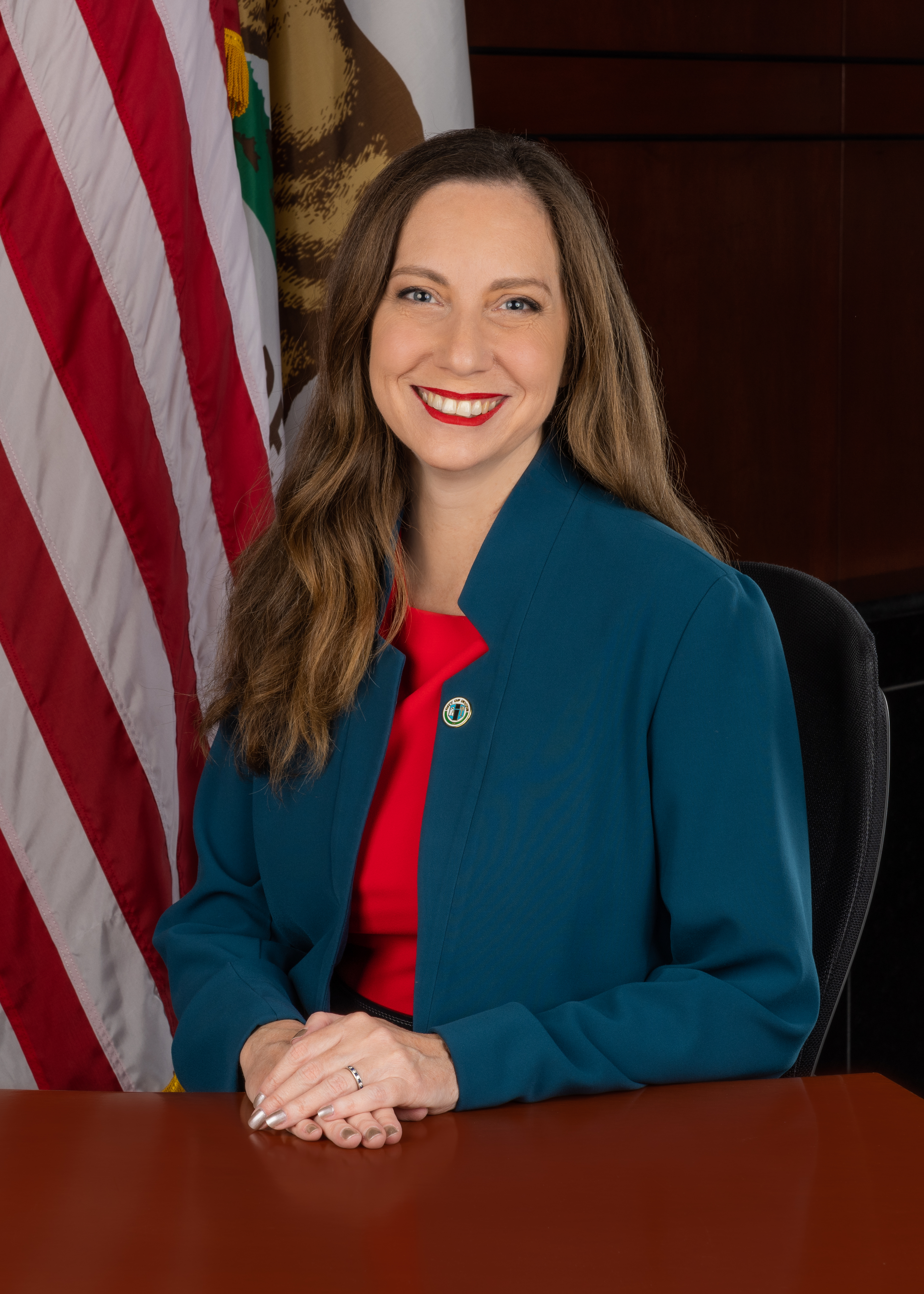
Candidate	Kathleen Treseder	Scotty Hong
Popular vote	5,326	3,825
Percentage	58.2%	41.8%
City Councilmember before election
Kathleen Treseder
City Councilmember
Kathleen Treseder

District 6 includes the neighborhoods of University Hills, Irvine Business Complex, and the University of California, Irvine. While technically vacant, Irvine councilmember Kathleen Treseder, serving at-large since 2022, resides in District 6.

==== Candidates ====
- Scotty Hong (Democratic), Council Executive Assistant to Irvine Mayor Larry Agran and Irvine Sustainability Commissioner
- Kathleen Treseder (Democratic), at-large Irvine City Councilmember

==== Fundraising ====
Campaign finance reports as of September 19, 2025
Candidate	Raised	Spent	Cash on hand
Kathleen Treseder (D)	$71,198	$14,620	$55,080
Scotty Hong (D)	$21,383	$14,367	$7,331
Source: City of Irvine

== School boards ==
The city of Irvine is served by several school boards, including the Irvine Unified School District, Tustin Unified School District and the South Orange County Community College District. School board elections with overlap in Irvine during the 2026 general election are listed below.

=== Irvine Unified School District ===
==== Area 2 ====
Area 2 covers portions of University Park, Woodbridge, Rancho San Joaquin, Westpark, and the Irvine Business Complex. The Incumbent is Katie McEwen, who was first elected in 2022.

===== Candidates =====
- Katie McEwen, incumbent Irvine Unified School Board Member
- Ron Scolesdang, Candidate for Irvine Mayor in 2024 and Irvine Sustainability Commissioner

==== Area 4 ====
Area 4 covers portions of Great Park, Portola Springs, Orchard Hills Cypress Village and Woodbury. The incumbent is Jeff Kim, who was elected in 2022 unopposed.

===== Candidates =====
- Jeff Kim, incumbent Irvine Unified School Board Member
- Jane Wood, Teacher and Businesswoman

=== Tustin Unified School District ===
==== Area 5 ====
Area 5 covers portions of Lower Peters Canyon and Walnut. The incumbent is Jonathan Abelove, who was elected in 2022 unopposed.

===== Candidates =====
- Jonathan Abelove, incumbent Tustin Unified School Board Member
- Ziggy McBride, Educator and Librarian

=== South Orange County Community College District ===
==== Area 2 ====
The election for SOCCCD Area 2 was cancelled, with incumbent T.J. Prendergast III securing a four year term.

== Ballot measures ==
=== Measure D ===
Measure D
- November 3, 2026
- Measure Directing the Use of Ranked Choice Voting for City Council Member and Mayoral Elections after January 1, 2028
- Reporting: 99%

Results
Choice	Votes	%
Yes	43,804	53.38%
No	38,254	46.62%
Valid votes	82,058	85.58%
Invalid or blank votes	13,826	14.42%
Total votes	95,884	100.00%
Registered voters/turnout	163,717	58.6%

The Irvine City Council voted to place a measure on the November 3, 2026 general election asking whether to adopt ranked-choice voting for municipal elections at its July 14th meeting. On August 10, 2026, the Orange County Registrar of Voters designated the ballot measure as Measure D (not to be confused with the 2024 ballot measure of the same name that expanded Irvine's city council and formed single member voting districts). Irvine's current elections are run under a first-past-the-post system where election winners frequently don't get majority support. (Note: All Irvine elections in 2024 with more than two candidates had winners earn less than 50% of the vote.) If passed, this measure would allow voters to rank candidates in order of preference; if no candidate wins a majority of first-choice votes, the last-place candidate is eliminated, and ballots are redistributed in rounds until one candidate reaches a majority.

If passed, ranked-choice voting would make Irvine one of two Orange County cities using the system, alongside Huntington Beach, which was separately ordered by an Orange County Superior Court judge to adopt ranked-choice voting following litigation over its at-large council elections.

==== Endorsements ====
Yes

U.S. Representatives

- Dave Min, CA-47 (2025–present)

State Representatives

- Cottie Petrie-Norris, California's 73rd district

Local Officials

- Ryan Dack, Trustee, South Orange County Community College District
- Carolyn Inmon, Trustee, South Orange County Community College District
- Betty Martinez Franco, Irvine City Councilmember
- Kathleen Treseder, Irvine City Councilmember
- Cyril Yu, Board Member, Irvine Unified School District

Political Parties

- Democratic Party of Orange County
- Forward Party California
- Green Party of Orange County
- Libertarian Party of California
- Peace and Freedom Party
- Orange County Democratice Socialists of America
- Working Families Party

Labor unions

- CSEA Irvine Chapter 517
- UAW Region 6
- UC Irvine Faculty Association
- UNITE HERE! Local 11

Organizations

- 50501 California
- California RCV Coalition
- Climate Action Campaign
- Democrats of Greater Irvine
- FairVote
- League of Women Voters
- Remake Irvine Streets for Everyone
- Sunrise Movement Orange County
No

Local Officials

- James Mai, Irvine Vice Mayor
