= 2024 Irvine elections =

Municipal elections in Irvine, California

- November 5, 2024

5 out of 7 seats on the City Council 4 seats needed for a majority
| | Majority party | Minority party |
|---|---|---|
| Party | Democratic | Republican |
| Seats before | 4 | 1 |
| Seats won | 3 | 2 |
| Seats after | 4 | 2 |
| Seat change | Steady | ▲1 |
- Party Gains: Republican gain Democratic hold (Note: While all districts were newly created under Measure D, the number of Democratic held seats did not change from 2022 to 2024, and are reflected here as a "hold".) Republican hold No election/Vacant/Member at-Large (Note: Under Measure D, District 5 and 6 were to remain vacant while council members who reside in those areas still serve their council term at-large.)

The 2024 Irvine elections were held on March 5, 2024, and November 5, 2024. In the March primary, voters approved Measure D, expanding the Irvine City Council from five to seven members and transitioning the city from at-large to by-district elections.

Measure D took effect in time for the November general election, creating four new council districts — three of which would elect representatives to four-year terms, and one short-term seat (District 1) to be contested again in 2026. The mayoralty was also on the ballot.

Municipal elections in California are officially nonpartisan; candidates' party affiliations do not appear on the ballot, but every major candidate was registered with or endorsed by a major political party.

== Mayor ==
The 2024 mayoral election was held on November 5, 2024 and coincided with elections for city council. Incumbent mayor Farrah Khan, who was first sworn into office in 2020, could not seek re-election due to term limits. Councilmember Larry Agran defeated fellow councilmember Tammy Kim and was sworn in as Mayor on December 10, 2024.

=== Results ===
2024 Irvine mayoral election
| Candidate | Votes | % |
|---|---|---|
| Larry Agran | 42,652 | 38.76 |
| Tammy Kim | 37,924 | 34.46 |
| Ron Scolesdang | 12,891 | 11.71 |
| Liqing Lee Sun | 6,001 | 5.45 |
| Felipe Delgado | 5,325 | 4.84 |
| Akshat Bhatia | 2,761 | 2.51 |
| Wing Chow | 2,496 | 2.27 |
| Total votes | 110,050 | 100.0 |

== City council ==
=== District 1 ===
2024 Irvine City Council District 1 election (short term)
- November 5, 2024
- Turnout: 75.4%
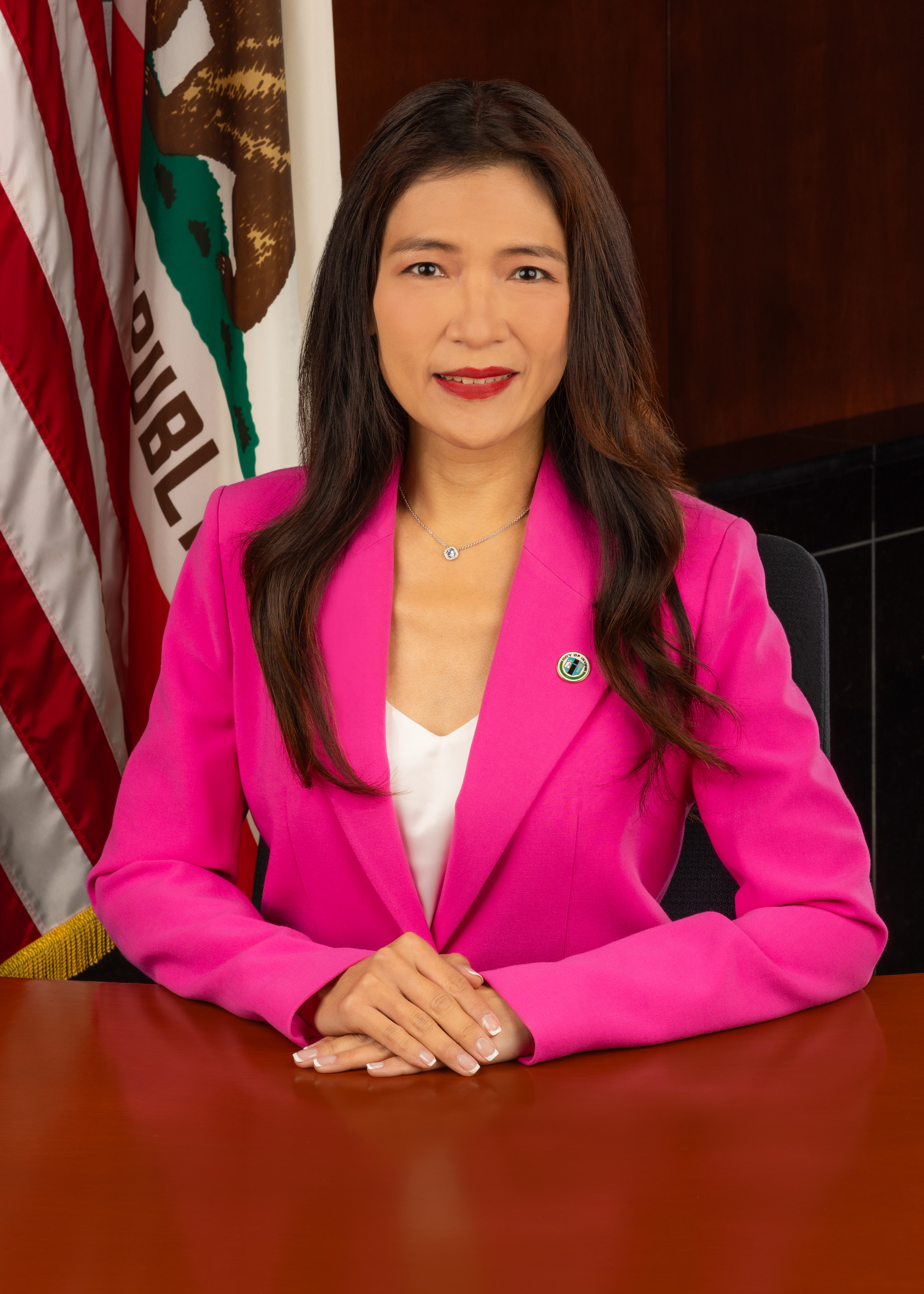
| Candidate | Melinda Liu | John Park | Michelle Johnson |
| Popular vote | 5,896 | 5,787 | 3,274 |
| Percentage | 32.3% | 31.7% | 17.9% |
| Candidate | Jackie Kan | Jeff Kitchen |
| Popular vote | 2,243 | 1,050 |
| Percentage | 12.3% | 5.8% |
- Precinct results Liu: 30–40% 40–50% Park: 30–40% No votes
City Councilmember before election
none (district created)
City Councilmember
Melinda Liu

District 1 covers north Irvine, including Orchard Hills, West Irvine, Northpark, Stonegate, and parts of Northwood. It was designated as a short-term seat, to be contested again in 2026.

The race was competitive, with five candidates — three of whom held or had held city commission seats. Key issues included traffic congestion on Jeffrey Road, preservation of open space in Orchard Hills, and fire risk management.

==== Candidates ====
- Melinda Liu (Democrat), City of Irvine commissioner and Attorney.
- John Park (Republican), business owner, Irvine Transportation Commissioner, and perennial candidate.
- Michelle Johnson (Republican), Irvine Planning Commissioner and business owner.
- Jackie Kan (Democrat), small business owner.
- Jeff Kitchen(Democrat), Systems engineer.

==== Fundraising ====
Campaign finance reports as of December 31, 2024 (Note: Raised and spent figures reflect campaign activity during calendar year 2024 only and do not include prior periods.)
| Candidate | Raised | Spent | Cash on hand |
|---|---|---|---|
| Melinda Liu (D) | $129,880 | $107,204 | $33,936 |
| Michelle Johnson (R) | $115,614 | $118,227 | $0 |
| Jackie Kan (D) | $58,064 | $56,980 | $0 |
| John Park (R) | $52,374 | $52,407 | $0 |
| Jeff Kitchen (D) | $8,368 | $8,229 | $0 |
Source: City of Irvine

==== Results ====
2024 Irvine City Council District 1 election (Short Term)
| Candidate | Votes | % |
|---|---|---|
| Melinda Liu | 5,896 | 32.3 |
| John Park | 5,787 | 31.7 |
| Michelle Johnson | 3,274 | 17.9 |
| Jackie Kan | 2,243 | 12.3 |
| Jeff Kitchen | 1,050 | 5.8 |
| Total votes | 18,250 | 100 |
| Invalid or blank votes | 2,890 | 13.7 |

=== Results by Neighborhood ===
Legend
Neighborhoods won by Liu
Neighborhoods won by Park

Results by neighborhood (Note: Each neighborhood is based on the City of Irvine's planning area map with planning areas that spread across multiple districts being noted.)
| Neighborhood | Liu | | Park | | Johnson | | Kan | | Kitchen | | Margin | | Total votes |
| Neighborhood | Votes | % | Votes | % | Votes | % | Votes | % | Votes | % | Votes | % | Total votes |
|---|---|---|---|---|---|---|---|---|---|---|---|---|---|
| Lower Peters Canyon (partial) | 2,452 | 32.77% | 2,383 | 31.85% | 1,335 | 17.84% | 854 | 11.41% | 459 | 6.13% | 69 | 0.92% | 7,483 |
| Northwood (partial) /Northwood Point (Note: Northwood and Northwood Point planning areas share precincts, and are combined for this table.) | 1,909 | 32.95% | 1,802 | 31.11% | 1,088 | 18.78% | 672 | 11.60% | 322 | 5.56% | 107 | 1.84% | 5,793 |
| Orchard Hills | 752 | 29.33% | 927 | 36.15% | 413 | 16.11% | 354 | 13.81% | 118 | 4.60% | 175 | 6.83% | 2,564 |
| Stonegate | 783 | 32.50% | 675 | 28.02% | 437 | 18.14% | 363 | 15.07% | 151 | 6.27% | 108 | 4.48% | 2,409 |
| Total | 5,896 | 32.31% | 5,787 | 31.71% | 3,274 | 17.76% | 2,243 | 12.29% | 1,050 | 5.75% | 109 | 0.60% | 18,250 |

=== District 2 ===
2024 Irvine City Council District 2 election
- November 5, 2024
- Turnout: 75.9%
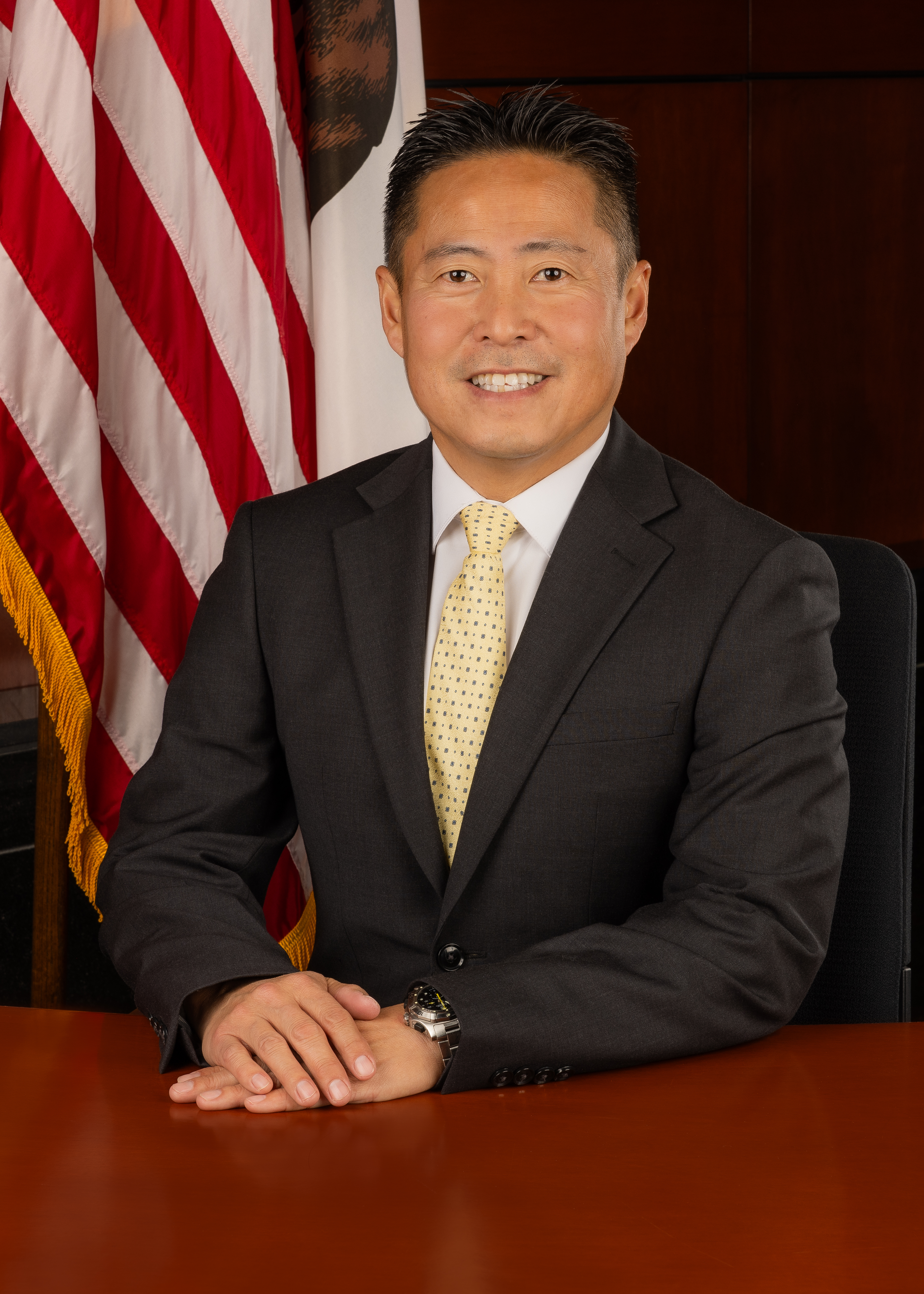
| Candidate | William Go | Jeff Starke |
| Popular vote | 5,352 | 4,441 |
| Percentage | 30.9% | 25.7% |
| Candidate | Gang Chen | Parrisa Yazdani |
| Popular vote | 3,624 | 3,199 |
| Percentage | 20.9% | 18.5% |
- Precinct results Go: 20–30% 30–40% Starke: 20–30% Yazdani: 30–40% No votes
City Councilmember before election
none (district created)
City Councilmember
William Go

District 2 covers portions of central and southeastern Irvine, including Great Park, Portola Springs, Cypress Village, Woodbury, and areas adjacent to the Irvine Spectrum.

During the campaign, Irvine Watchdog reported that Yazdani had filed for Chapter 7 bankruptcy in April 2024, resulting in the discharge of approximately $900,000 in state and federal tax debt, as well as related fines. Subsequent reporting by the Orange Juice Blog detailed an ongoing civil lawsuit in which a creditor alleged that Yazdani had misrepresented her ownership role in a business when obtaining loans, and sought to have the debt declared non-dischargeable due to fraud and misappropriation claims. Yazdani filed a response in court denying all allegations. The reports drew media and community attention in the weeks leading up to the election.

==== Candidates ====
- William Go (Democrat), Irvine commissioner and businessowner.
- Jeff Starke (Democrat), City of Irvine finance commissioner.
- Gang Chen (Republican), architect, author and businessman.
- Parrisa Yazdani (Independent), City of Irvine commissioner, businesswoman.
- Mohamed Kothermydeen (Independent), IT service manager.

==== Withdrawn ====
- Alex Mohajer (Democrat), nonprofit executive and former candidate for the California State Senate in 2024. Mohajer ended his campaign in July 2024, announcing plans to relocate to Arizona to work on voter outreach efforts ahead of the 2024 U.S. presidential election.

==== Fundraising ====
Italics indicate a withdrawn candidate.

Campaign finance reports as of December 31, 2024
| Candidate | Raised | Spent | Cash on hand |
|---|---|---|---|
| William Go (D) | $92,491 | $76,574 | $15,918 |
| Jeff Starke (D) | $34,087 | $39,336 | $0 |
| Alex Mohajer (D) | $19,686 | $2,935 | $16,751 |
| Parissa Yazdani (NPP) | $11,094 | $13,239 | $1,855 |
| Gang Chen (R) | $5,428 | $17,922 | $0 |
| Mohamed Kothermydeen (NPP) | no filing | no filing | no filing |
Source: City of Irvine

==== Results ====
2024 Irvine City Council District 2 election
| Candidate | Votes | % |
|---|---|---|
| William Go | 5,352 | 30.9 |
| Jeff Starke | 4,441 | 25.7 |
| Gang Chen | 3,624 | 20.9 |
| Parrisa Yazdani | 3,199 | 18.5 |
| Mohamed Kothermydeen | 689 | 4.0 |
| Total votes | 17,305 | 100 |
| Invalid or blank votes | 3,047 | 15.0 |

=== Results by Neighborhood ===
Legend
Neighborhoods won by Go
Neighborhoods won by Yazdani

Results by neighborhood
| Neighborhood | Go | | Starke | | Chen | | Yazdani | | Kothermydeen | | Margin | | Total votes |
| Neighborhood | Votes | % | Votes | % | Votes | % | Votes | % | Votes | % | Votes | % | Total votes |
|---|---|---|---|---|---|---|---|---|---|---|---|---|---|
| Cypress Village | 939 | 31.88% | 918 | 31.17% | 567 | 19.25% | 390 | 13.24% | 131 | 4.45% | 21 | 0.71% | 2,945 |
| Great Park | 1,346 | 32.90% | 803 | 19.63% | 720 | 17.60% | 1,036 | 25.32% | 186 | 4.55% | 310 | 7.58% | 4,091 |
| Spectrum (partial) | 3 | 23.08% | 4 | 30.77% | 1 | 7.69% | 5 | 38.46% | 0 | 0% | 1 | 7.69% | 13 |
| Portola Springs | 1,742 | 28.35% | 1,620 | 26.36% | 1,451 | 23.61% | 1,053 | 17.67% | 246 | 4.00% | 122 | 1.99% | 6,145 |
| Woodbury | 1,321 | 32.22% | 1,090 | 26.59% | 882 | 21.51% | 681 | 16.61% | 126 | 3.07% | 231 | 5.52% | 4,100 |
| Total (Note: Precincts reporting less than 10 total votes are not reported by the OC Registrar of Voters at the precinct level, which accounts for the variance in totals on this chart compared to overall district results.) | 5,351 | 30.94% | 4,435 | 25.64% | 3,621 | 20.94.76% | 3,198 | 18.49% | 689 | 3.98% | 916 | 5.30% | 17,294 |

=== District 3 ===
2024 Irvine City Council District 3 election
- November 5, 2024
- Turnout: 77.7%
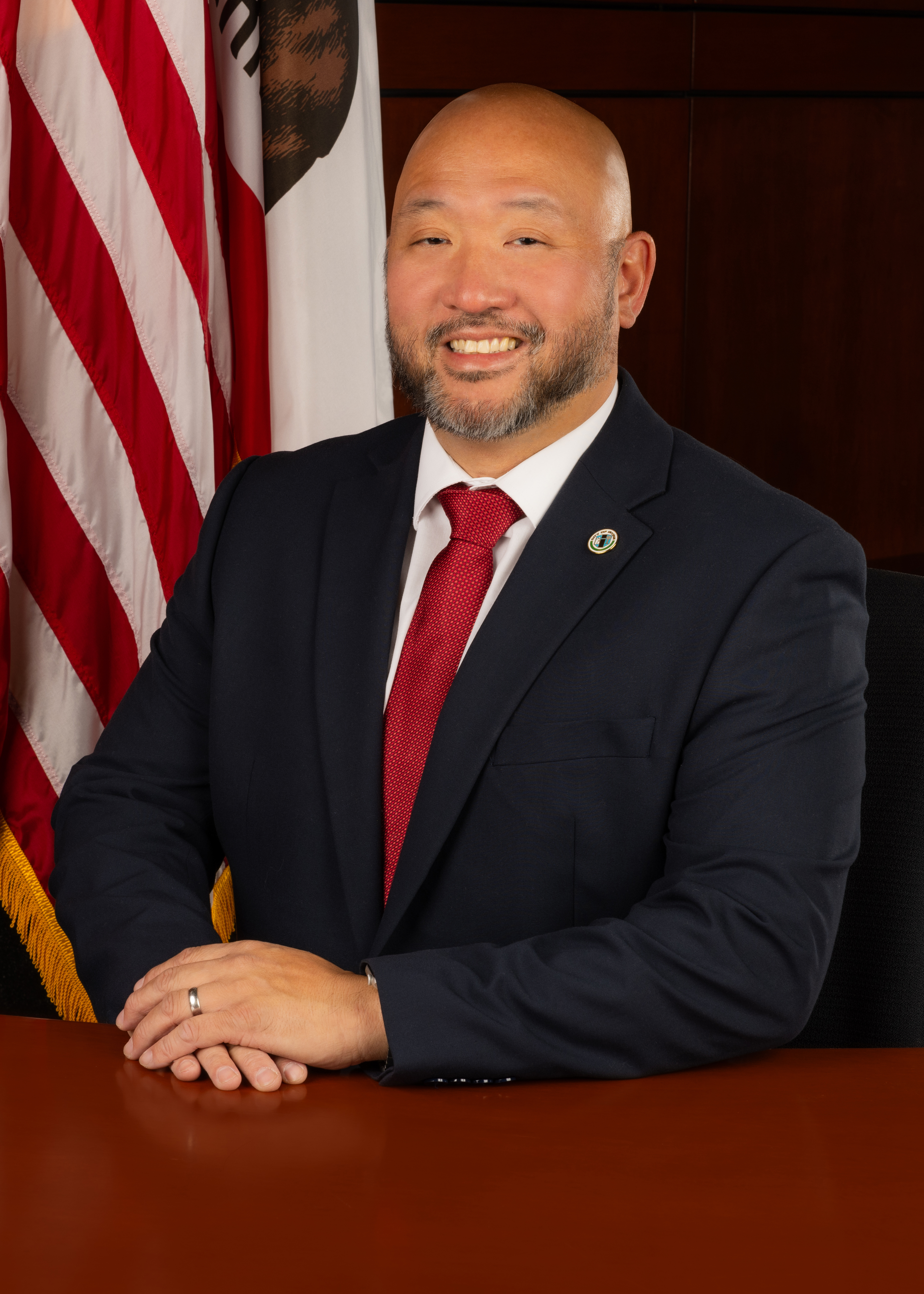
| Candidate | James Mai | Tom Chomyn |
| Popular vote | 8,968 | 5,845 |
| Percentage | 44.0% | 28.7% |
| Candidate | Jing Sun |
| Popular vote | 5,569 |
| Percentage | 27.3% |
- Precinct results Mai: 30–40% 40–50% 50–60% Chomyn: 30–40% No votes
City Councilmember before election
none (district created)
City Councilmember
James Mai

District 3 is located in central and north-central Irvine, including neighborhoods such as Walnut Village and portions of El Camino Real.

==== Candidates ====
- James Mai (Republican), Irvine commissioner and businessman.
- Tom Chomyn (Democrat), Community Services Commissioner.
- Jing Sun (Democrat), Irvine commissioner.

==== Fundraising ====
Campaign finance reports as of December 31, 2024
| Candidate | Raised | Spent | Cash on hand |
|---|---|---|---|
| Jing Sun (D) | $63,326 | $63,326 | $0 |
| Tom Chomyn (D) | $32,283 | $33,833 | $90 |
| James Mai (R) | $25,316 | $25,316 | $0 |
Source: City of Irvine

==== Results ====
2024 Irvine City Council District 3 election
| Candidate | Votes | % |
|---|---|---|
| James Mai | 8,968 | 44.0 |
| Tom Chomyn | 5,845 | 28.7 |
| Jing Sun | 5,569 | 27.3 |
| Total votes | 20,382 | 100 |
| Invalid or blank votes | 3,647 | 15.2 |

=== Results by Neighborhood ===
Legend
Neighborhoods won by Mai
Neighborhoods won by Chomyn

Results by neighborhood
| Neighborhood | Mai | | Chomyn | | Sun | | Margin | | Total votes |
| Neighborhood | Votes | % | Votes | % | Votes | % | Votes | % | Total votes |
|---|---|---|---|---|---|---|---|---|---|
| El Camino Real | 2,856 | 43.88% | 2,014 | 30.95% | 1,638 | 25.17% | 842 | 12.94% | 6,508 |
| Lower Peters Canyon (partial) | 157 | 44.99% | 86 | 24.64% | 106 | 30.37% | 51 | 14.61% | 349 |
| Northwood (partial) | 3,262 | 45.05% | 2,029 | 28.02% | 1,950 | 26.93% | 1,233 | 17.03% | 7,241 |
| Walnut | 1,532 | 43.76% | 1,007 | 28.76% | 962 | 27.48% | 5257 | 15.00% | 3,501 |
| Westpark II | 1,161 | 41.72% | 709 | 25.48% | 913 | 32.81% | 248 | 8.91% | 2,783 |
| Total | 8,968 | 44.00% | 5,845 | 28.68% | 5,569 | 27.32% | 3,123 | 15.32% | 20,382 |

=== District 4 ===
2024 Irvine City Council District 4 election
- November 5, 2024
- Turnout: 79.2%
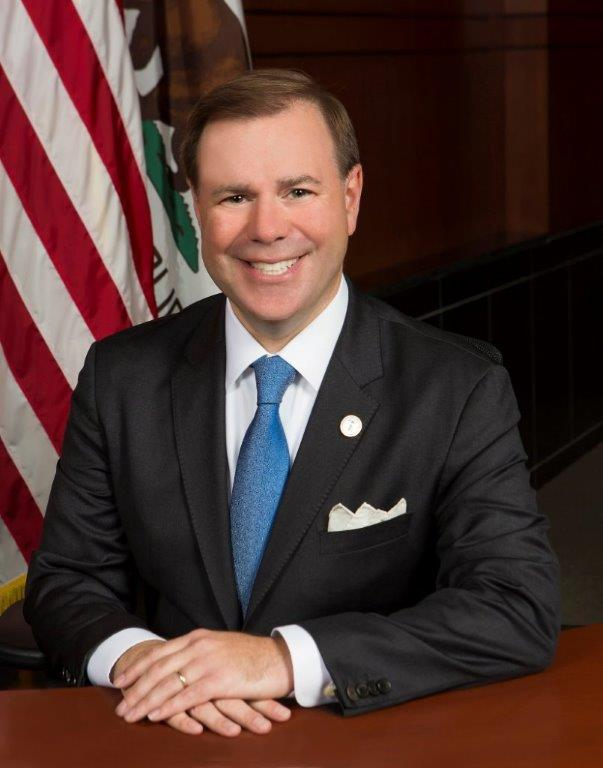
| Candidate | Mike Carroll | Ayn Craciun |
| Popular vote | 10,255 | 7,446 |
| Percentage | 57.93% | 42.1% |
- Precinct results Carroll: 50–60% 60–70% 80–90% Craciun: 50–60% No votes
City Councilmember before election
Mike Carroll (at-large)
City Councilmember
Mike Carroll

District 4 encompasses southwestern Irvine, including Quail Hill, Turtle Rock, Turtle Ridge, portions of University Park, Irvine Spectrum, and open space areas bordering Laguna Canyon. Incumbent Mike Carroll, previously elected at-large in 2020, sought and won re-election to the district seat.

The contest was one of the most closely watched in the city, with Carroll facing sustainability commissioner Ayn Craciun. The campaign drew renewed scrutiny amid questions about Carroll’s use of his official city portrait on campaign materials,raising concerns about blurring the boundary between public duty and campaign activity.

This was not Carroll’s first such controversy. In late 2020, he came under fire for using approximately $70,000 from his staff budget on city mailers that critics argued served to promote his political profile rather than purely inform constituents. Following the backlash, the City Council in January 2021 approved new budget policies—by a 4–1 vote—that shifted oversight responsibilities to the city manager, aiming to increase transparency and accountability for council members' spending.

==== Candidates ====
- Mike Carroll (Republican), incumbent Irvine City Councilmember (at-large).
- Ayn Craciun (Democrat), nonprofit director and Chair of the Irvine Sustainability Commission.

==== Fundraising ====
Campaign finance reports as of December 31, 2024
| Candidate | Raised | Spent | Cash on hand |
|---|---|---|---|
| Ayn Craciun (D) | $83,744 | $83,406 | $0 |
| Mike Carroll (R) | $68,446 | $62,704 | $9,749 |
Source: City of Irvine

==== Results ====
2024 Irvine City Council District 4 election
| Candidate | Votes | % |
|---|---|---|
| Mike Carroll (incumbent) | 10,255 | 57.9 |
| Ayn Craciun | 7,446 | 42.1 |
| Total votes | 17,701 | 100 |
| Invalid or blank votes | 3,050 | 14.7 |

=== Results by Neighborhood ===
Legend
Neighborhoods won by Carroll
Neighborhoods won by Craciun

Results by neighborhood
| Neighborhood | Carroll | | Craciun | | Margin | | Total votes |
| Neighborhood | Votes | % | Votes | % | Votes | % | Total votes |
|---|---|---|---|---|---|---|---|
| Laguna Altura | 786 | 57.50% | 581 | 42.20% | 205 | 15.00% | 1,367 |
| Los Olivos | 615 | 58.13% | 443 | 41.87% | 172 | 16.26% | 1,058 |
| Oak Creek | 2,109 | 58.13% | 1,519 | 41.87% | 590 | 16.26% | 3,628 |
| Quail Hill | 1,282 | 49.59% | 1,303 | 50.41% | 21 | 0.81% | 2,585 |
| Shady Canyon | 411 | 80.43% | 100 | 19.57% | 311 | 60.86% | 511 |
| Spectrum (partial) | 989 | 54.88% | 813 | 45.12% | 176 | 9.77% | 1,802 |
| Turtle Ridge | 1,069 | 67.02% | 526 | 32.98% | 543 | 34.04% | 1,595 |
| Turtle Rock | 2,906 | 58.37% | 2,073 | 41.63% | 833 | 16.73% | 4,979 |
| University Park (partial) | 82 | 48.81% | 86 | 51.19% | 4 | 2.38% | 168 |
| Total | 10,249 | 57.93% | 7,444 | 42.07% | 2,502 | 15.85% | 17,693 |

== Ballot measures ==
=== Measure D ===
Measure D
- March 5, 2024
- Amendment to Expand City Council and Establish City Council Districts

Results
| Choice | Votes | % |
|---|---|---|
| Yes | 30,790 | 59.80% |
| No | 20,696 | 40.20% |
| Valid votes | 51,486 | 93.68% |
| Invalid or blank votes | 3,475 | 6.32% |
| Total votes | 54,961 | 100.00% |
| Registered voters/turnout | 153,044 | 35.9% |
Yes
50–60%
60–70%
70–80%
80–90%
>90%
No
50–60%
60–70%

Measure D was a charter amendment placed before Irvine voters in the March 5, 2024 primary election. It proposed expanding the Irvine City Council from five to seven members, including the mayor and six councilmembers, and changing the electoral system so that the six councilmembers would be elected by individual districts rather than at large. The measure passed with approximately 59.8 percent of the vote.

The measure stipulates that if a councilmember elected at large—but residing in District 5 or District 6—vacates their seat, the position must be filled through a by‑district special municipal election (rather than appointment). Following the election of Councilmember Larry Agran to mayor a special election was held on April 15, 2025, to fill the remainder of his term for District 5.

== School Boards ==
The city of Irvine is served by several school districts, including the Irvine Unified School District, Tustin Unified School District, Santa Ana Unified School District, and the South Orange County Community College District. School board elections held in Irvine are listed below.

=== Irvine Unified School District ===
==== Area 1 ====
The general election for IUSD Area 1 was cancelled, with incumbent Lauren Brooks securing a four year term.

==== Area 3 ====
The general election for IUSD Area 3 was cancelled, with incumbent Cyril Yu securing a four year term.

==== Area 5 ====
The general election for IUSD Area 5 was cancelled, with Connie Stone securing a four year term after incumbent Paul Bakota opted not to run for re-election.

=== Tustin Unified School District ===
==== Area 2 ====
2024 Tustin Unified School District Area 2 election
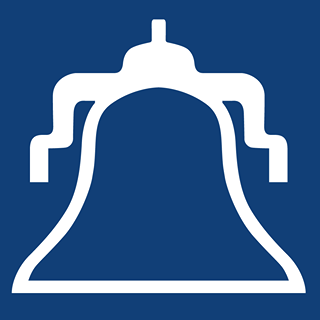
- November 5, 2024
- Turnout: 82.2%
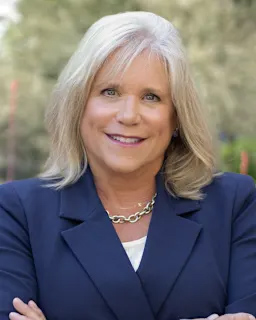
| Candidate | Kathy Copeland | Bill Pevehouse |
| Popular vote | 7,753 | 6,599 |
| Percentage | 54.02% | 45.98% |
- Precinct results Copeland: 50–60% Pevehouse: 50–60% No votes
Trustee before election
James Laird
Trustee
Kathy Copeland

Incumbent James Laird opted to not run for re-election. District 2 covers portions of Northpark and Orchard Hills in Irvine. Kathy Copeland was elected over Bill Pevehouse

2024 Tustin Unified School District Trustee Area 2 election
| Candidate | Votes | % |
|---|---|---|
| Kathy Copeland | 7,753 | 54.0 |
| Bill Pevehouse | 6,599 | 46.0 |
| Total votes | 14,352 | 100 |
| Invalid or blank votes | 2,290 | 13.8 |

=== South Orange County Community College District ===
==== Area 1 ====
2024 South Orange County Community College District Area 1 election
- November 5, 2024
- Turnout: 80.2%
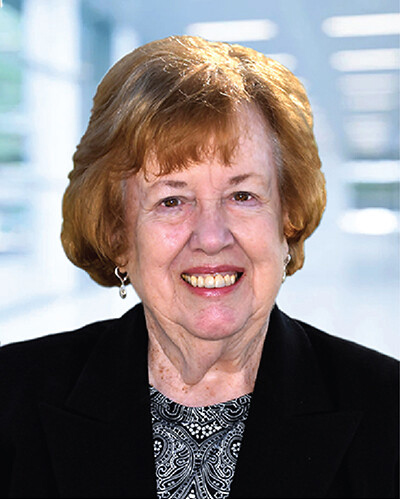
| Candidate | Carolyn Inmon | Katherine Daigle |
| Popular vote | 31,500 | 9,115 |
| Percentage | 68.4% | 19.8% |
| Candidate | Marlene Bronson |
| Popular vote | 5,446 |
| Percentage | 11.8% |
- Precinct results Inmon: 50–60% 60–70% 70–80% 80–90% No votes
Trustee before election
Caroyln Inmon
Elected Trustee
Carolyn Inmon

Incumbent Carolyn Inmon was re-elected to a four year term ending in 2028. Area 1 covers much of south west Irvine, including UCI, Woodbridge and University Park. Inmon defeated Marlene Bronson and perennial candidate Katherine Daigle.

2024 South Orange County Community College District Trustee Area 1 election
| Candidate | Votes | % |
|---|---|---|
| Carolyn Inmon (incumbent) | 31,500 | 68.4 |
| Katherine Daigle | 9,115 | 19.8 |
| Marlene Bronson | 5,446 | 11.8 |
| Total votes | 45,061 | 100 |
| Invalid or blank votes | 13,880 | 23.2 |

==== Area 3 ====
2024 South Orange County Community College District Area 3 election
- November 5, 2024
- Turnout: 82.8%
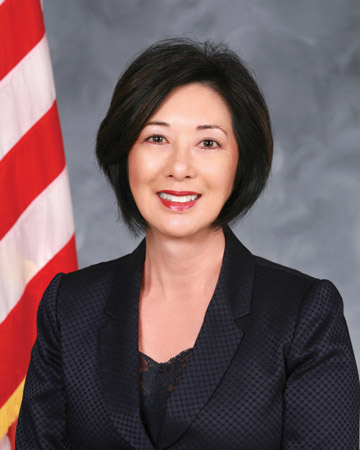
| Candidate | Lisa Bartlett | Rocky Cifone |
| Popular vote | 37,354 | 34,501 |
| Percentage | 52.0% | 48.0% |
- Precinct results Bartlett: 50–60% 60–70% 70–80% Cifone: 50–60% 60–70% No votes
Trustee before election
Barbara Jay
Elected Trustee
Lisa Bartlet

Incumbent Barbara Jay opted to not run for re-election. Area 3 covers one neighborhood within Turtle Ridge in Irvine. Lisa Bartlett defeated Rocky Cifone to serve a full term of four years on the South Orange County Community College District.

2024 South Orange County Community College District Trustee Area 3 election
| Candidate | Votes | % |
|---|---|---|
| Lisa Bartlett | 37,354 | 52.0 |
| Rocky Cifone | 34,501 | 48.0 |
| Total votes | 71,855 | 100 |
| Invalid or blank votes | 15,866 | 18.1 |

==== Area 6 ====
2024 South Orange County Community College District Area 6 election
- November 5, 2024
- Turnout: 78.3%
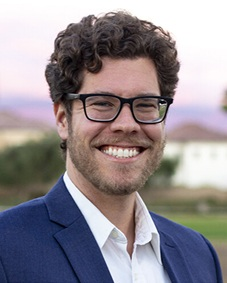
| Candidate | Ryan Dack | Michael Franklin |
| Popular vote | 31,125 | 20,318 |
| Percentage | 59.7% | 40.3% |
- Precinct results Dack 50–60% 60–70% 70–80% Franklin: 60–70% No votes
Trustee before election
Ryan Dack
Elected Trustee
Ryan Dack

Incumbent Ryan Dack was re-elected to a full four year term ending in 2028. Area 6 covers the Irvine Spectrum neighborhoods, Great Park neighborhoods, Woodbury, Oak Creek, and portions of Northwood. Dack defeated Michael Franklin.

2024 South Orange County Community College District Trustee Area 6 election
| Candidate | Votes | % |
|---|---|---|
| Ryan Dack (incumbent) | 30,125 | 59.7 |
| Michael Franklin | 20,318 | 40.3 |
| Total votes | 50,443 | 100 |
| Invalid or blank votes | 16,933 | 25.1 |
