= 2022 Irvine elections =

Municipal elections in Irvine, California

- November 8, 2022

3 out of 5 at-large seats on the City Council 3 seats needed for a majority
	Majority party	Minority party
Party	Democratic	Republican
Seats before	3	2
Seats won	2	0
Seats after	4	1
Seat change	▲1	▼1
- Party Gains: Democratic gain Democratic hold No election

The 2022 Irvine elections were held on November 8, 2022, to elect municipal officials in Irvine, California. Voters elected a mayor and two city councilmembers under the city’s at-large electoral system, in which all voters citywide could vote for all open seats.

Municipal elections in California are officially nonpartisan; candidates’ party affiliations did not appear on the ballot.

== Mayor ==
Incumbent mayor Farrah N. Khan ran for a second term and was re-elected mayor of Irvine on November 8, 2022.

2022 Irvine mayoral election
Candidate	Votes	%
Farrah N. Khan (incumbent)	29,628	37.8
Branda Lin	21,560	27.5
Simon Moon	14,834	18.9
Katherine Daigle	7,184	9.2
Tom Chomyn	5,129	6.6
Total votes	78,335	100.00
Invalid or blank votes	6,328	7.5

== City council ==
2022 Irvine city council election
- November 8, 2022
- Turnout: 55.2%
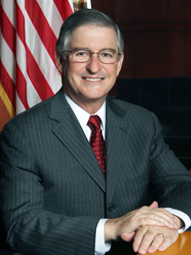

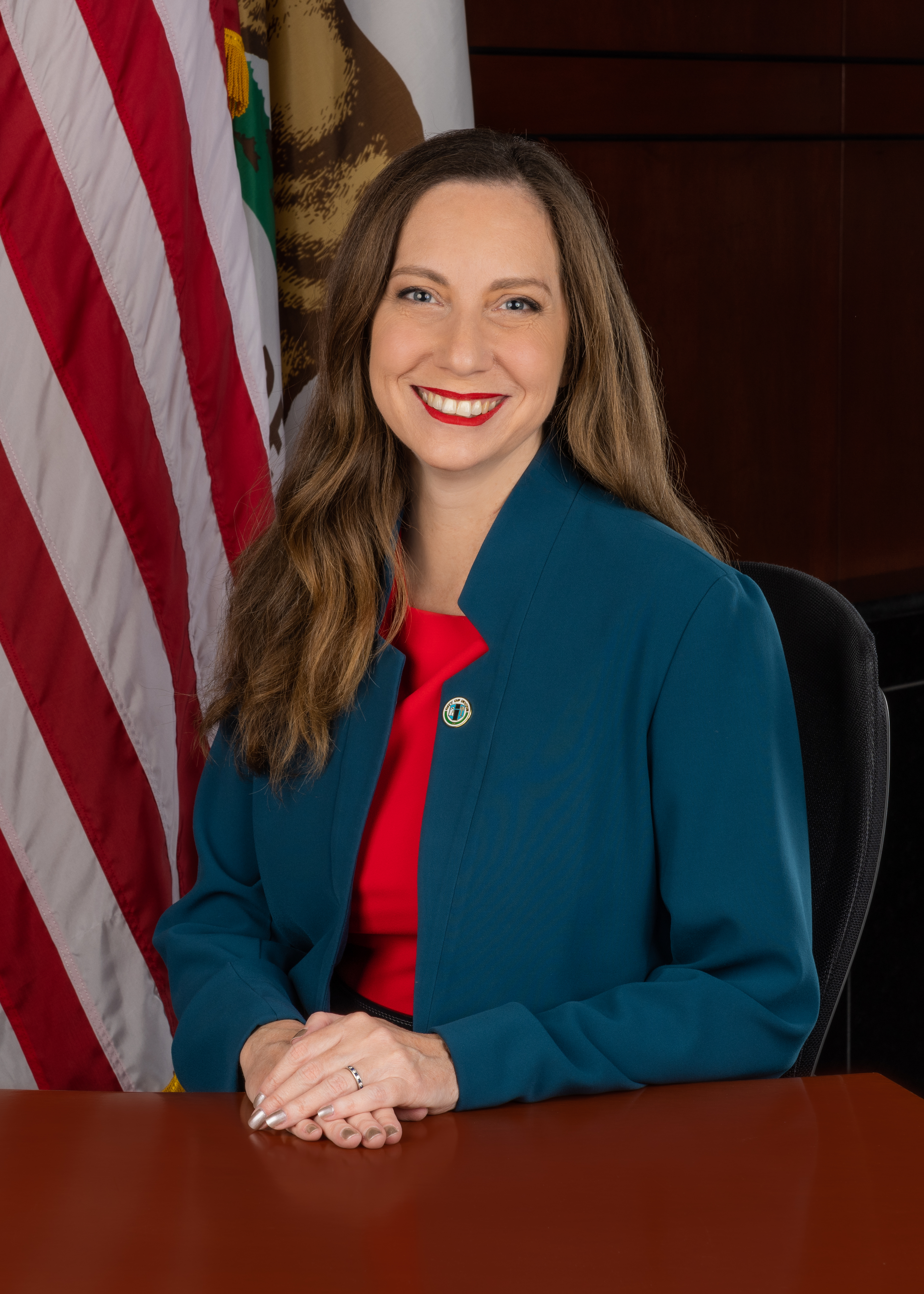

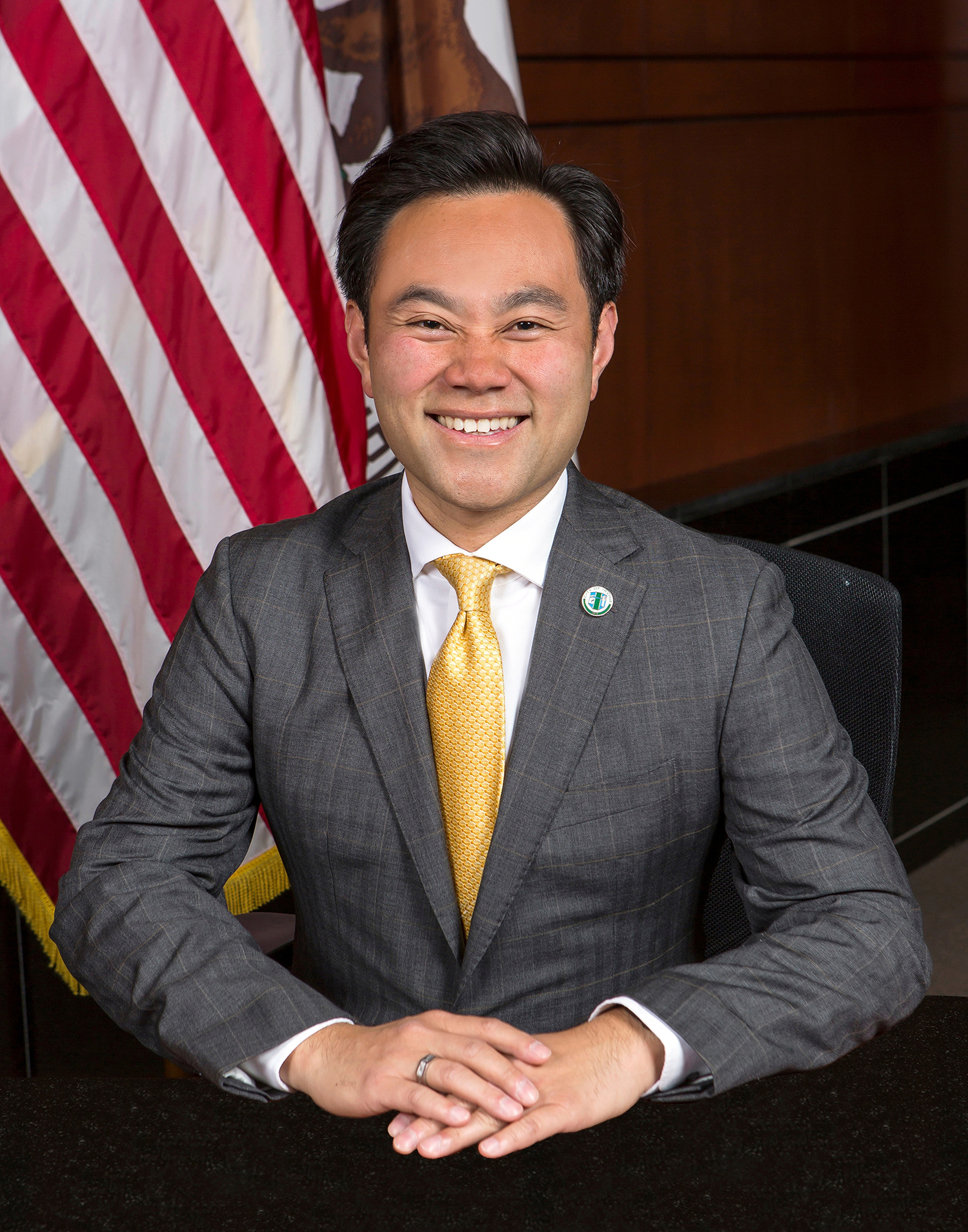
Candidate	Larry Agran	Kathleen Treseder
Popular vote	31,023	29,440
Percentage	23.9	22.6%
Candidate	Anthony Kuo	John Park
Popular vote	27,272	24,891
Percentage	21.0%	19.1%
- Precinct results Agran: 20–30% 30–40% Treseder: 20–30% 30–40% 40–50% Kuo: 20–30% 30–40% Park: 20–30% 30–40% Tie: 20–30% No votes
Councilmembers before election
Larry Agran
Anthony Kuo
Elected Councilmembers
Larry Agran
Kathleen Treseder

Two at-large seats on the Irvine City Council were contested in the 2022 general election. Voters were allowed to vote for up to two candidates. The top two vote-getters were elected to the city council.

=== Candidates ===
Candidates who ran for city council are listed below, along with their ballot designation.

- Larry Agran (Democrat), Irvine City Councilmember, elected to a short term in 2020
- Kathleen Treseder (Democrat), Educator/Climate Scientist, UCI Biological Sciences Professor
- Anthony Kuo (Republican), Vice Mayor, City of Irvine, elected to council in 2018
- John Park (Republican), Irvine Commissioner/Businessman
- Scott Hansen, (Democrat) City of Irvine Commissioner/Technologist
- Navid Sadigh (No Party Preference), College Student

=== Results ===
2022 Irvine City Council election
Candidate	Votes	%
Larry Agran (incumbent)	31,023	23.9
Kathleen Treseder	29,440	22.6
Anthony Kuo (incumbent)	27,272	21.0
John Park	24,891	19.1
Scott Hansen	12,481	9.6
Navid Sadigh	4,895	3.8

== School boards ==
The city of Irvine is served by several school boards, including the Irvine Unified School District, Tustin Unified School District and the South Orange County Community College District. School board elections with overlap in Irvine during the 2022 general election are listed below.

=== Irvine Unified School District ===
==== Area 2 ====
2022 Irvine Unified School District Area 2 election
- November 8, 2022
- Turnout: 55.2%
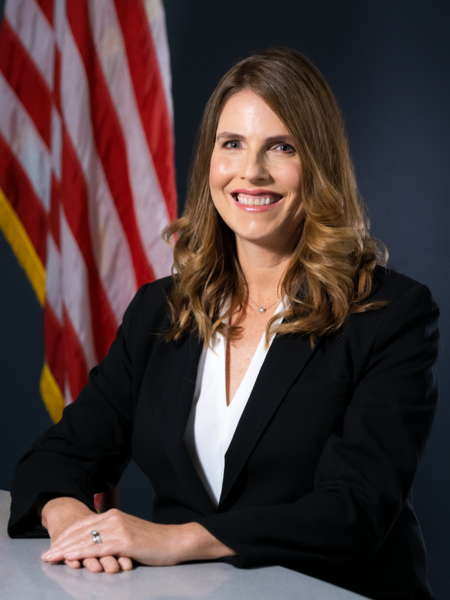
Candidate	Katie McEwen	Debra Hilton Kamm
Popular vote	8,190	3,117
Percentage	66.0%	25.1%
Candidate	Marlene Bronson
Popular vote	1,106
Percentage	8.0%
- Precinct results McEwen 50–60% 60–70% No votes
Trustee before election
Sharon Wallin
Elected Trustee
Katie McEwen

Incumbent Sharon Wallin opted not to run for re-election. Area 2 covers portions of University Park, Woodbridge, Rancho San Joaquin, Westpark, and the Irvine Business Complex. Katie McEwen was elected to the IUSD Area 2 trustee seat, defeating Debra Hilton Kamm and Marlene Bronson.

2022 Irvine Unified School District Area Map
Candidate	Votes	%
Katie McEwen	8,190	66.0
Debra Hilton Kamm	3,117	25.1
Marlene Bronson	1,106	8.0
Total votes	12,413	100.00
Invalid or blank votes	3,193	20.5

==== Area 4 ====
The election for IUSD Area 4 was cancelled after only one candidate filed. Jeff Kim was elected by default.

=== Tustin Unified School District ===
==== Area 5 ====
The election for TUSD Area 5 was cancelled, with incumbent Jonathan Abelove securing a four-year term.

=== South Orange County Community College District ===
==== Area 2 ====
The election for SOCCCD Area 2 was cancelled, with incumbent T.J. Prendergast III securing a four year term.

==== Area 6 ====
2022 South Orange County Community College District Area 6 election (short term)
- November 8, 2022
- Turnout: 55.1%
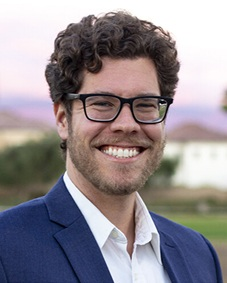
Candidate	Ryan Dack	Pramod Kunju
Popular vote	34,772	14,929
Percentage	70.0%	30.0%
- Precinct results Dack 50–60% 60–70% 70–80% No votes
Trustee before election
James R. Wright
Elected Trustee
Ryan Dack

Ryan Dack was elected to a short-term seat representing Area 6 of the South Orange County Community College District, after the incumbent, James R. Wright, resigned in the middle of his term. Dack defeated Pramod Kunju for a short two-year term. Area 6 covers portions of Irvine Spectrum, Great Park, Oak Creek, Cypress Village, Northwood, Woodbury, Orchard Hills, and Peters Canyon.

2022 Irvine Unified School District Area
Candidate	Votes	%
Ryan Dack	34,772	70.0
Pramod Kunju	14,929	30.0
Total votes	49,701	100.00
Invalid or blank votes	15,070	23.3
