= Irvine Measure D =

Irvine Measure D may refer to:

- 2024 Irvine Measure D, a municipal ballot measure expanding the Irvine City Council and establishing district elections
- 2026 Irvine Measure D, a municipal ballot measure directing the transition to ranked-choice voting
