= Adriana Romero-Olivares =

Mexican soil microbiologist

Adriana L. Romero-Olivares (died April 2026) was a Mexican soil microbiologist, fungal ecologist, and evolutionary biologist who studied the ecological impacts of soil microbes on habitats ranging from the deserts of the Southwestern United States and Mexico to Alaska's boreal forests in relation to ecological resilience, global warming, and human disease. In 2024 Romero-Olivares was profiled in the book Determined to be Extraordinary: Spectacular Stories of Modern Women in STEM. An assistant professor at New Mexico State University from 2020 to 2025, Romero-Olivares moved to the University of California, Riverside in January 2026 where she was an assistant professor in the Department of Evolution, Ecology, and Organismal Biology.

== Early life and education ==
Romero-Olivares was born in Mexico and grew up in Hermosillo, Sonora. In 2008, she received a bachelor's degree in biology, and in 2010, a master's degree in molecular ecology and biotechnology from the Autonomous University of Baja California in Ensenada, Mexico. In 2017 she received a PhD in biological sciences from the University of California, Irvine in the Department of Ecology and Evolutionary Biology. Her PhD advisor was Kathleen Treseder, an ecologist who studies the relationship between fungi and global climate change.

== Career ==
Following her PhD, Romero-Olivares was a postdoctoral fellow at the University of New Hampshire from 2017 to 2020 where she worked with Serita Frey and studied microbiome genomic responses to simulated nitrogen pollution and increased temperatures in the Harvard Forest. In August 2020, in the middle of the COVID-19 pandemic, she started her lab as an assistant professor in the Department of Biology in New Mexico State University at Las Cruces where she worked until 2026 when she joined the Department of Evolution, Ecology, and Organismal Biology and the University of California, Riverside.

== Research and contributions ==
=== Valley Fever ===
For her masters thesis at the Autonomous Universidad of Baja California, Romero-Olivares studied Coccidioides, a genus of fungi that includes species that cause Valley Fever, a human disease that is endemic to the Southwestern United States and Mexico, a topic she would return to later in her career.

=== Dryland fungal ecology ===
A major focus of Romero-Olivares' research was the ecology of desert fungi, which she said were "often overlooked" in dryland ecosystems research. She also stated that such ecosystems were underrepresented in global change research.

=== Science and society ===
Romero-Olivares wrote several highly cited papers about the relationship between scientists in the Global North and the Global South and her personal experiences with the unwelcoming attitude of some scientist reviewers toward scientific authors whose first language was not English.

She was also a member of the Microbes and Social Equity working group which has called for more research on the interplay between microorganisms, individuals, societies, and ecosystems, noting that microbes record the material conditions and social relations to which a human host has been exposed.

In 2023, she contributed to a report by the American Academy of Microbiology on the need to incorporate microbes into Earth Systems models.

=== Science communication ===
She also provided expert commentary to newspapers and magazines on the topics of fungal biology, viruses that infect fungi, fungicides, and women in science.

== Honors and awards ==
- 2014-2015 American Association of University Women, International Fellowship
- 2017 Dynamic Woman of UCI Academic Achievement Award
- 2019 Mycological Society of America Outstanding Service Award
- 2019-2020 Diversity & Innovation Scholar, University of New Hampshire
- 2021 Interchange Ambassador Award from the Mycological Society of America
- 2021 Excellence in Ecology Award from the Ecological Society of America
