= 2025 Irvine elections =

2025 Irvine special election
- April 15, 2025

1 of 7 seats on City Council 4 seats needed for a majority
	Majority party	Minority party
Party	Democratic	Republican
Seats before	4	2
Seats won	1	0
Seats after	5	2
Seat change	▲1	Steady
- Party Gains: Democratic gain No election

The 2025 Irvine special election was held on April 15, 2025, to fill a vacancy on the Irvine City Council created when Councilmember Larry Agran was elected Mayor of Irvine in the November 2024 election and sworn in the following December.

Although Agran was elected at-large in 2022, the passage of Measure D in March 2024 restructured Irvine's electoral system. The measure expanded the City Council from five to seven members and transitioned elections from at-large to by-district. It also established that any vacancy in an at-large seat held by a councilmember residing in District 5 or 6 would be filled by a special election in that district.

As Agran resided in the newly created District 5, the vacancy was filled through a by-district special election on April 15, 2025. District 5 includes the neighborhoods of Rancho San Joaquin, University Park, Westpark, and Woodbridge.

Municipal elections in California are officially nonpartisan, and candidates' party affiliations do not appear on the ballot.

== District 5 ==
2025 Irvine City Council District 5 special election
- April 15, 2025
- Turnout: 27.6%
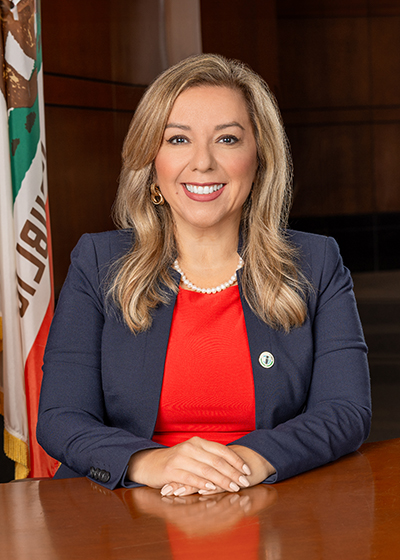

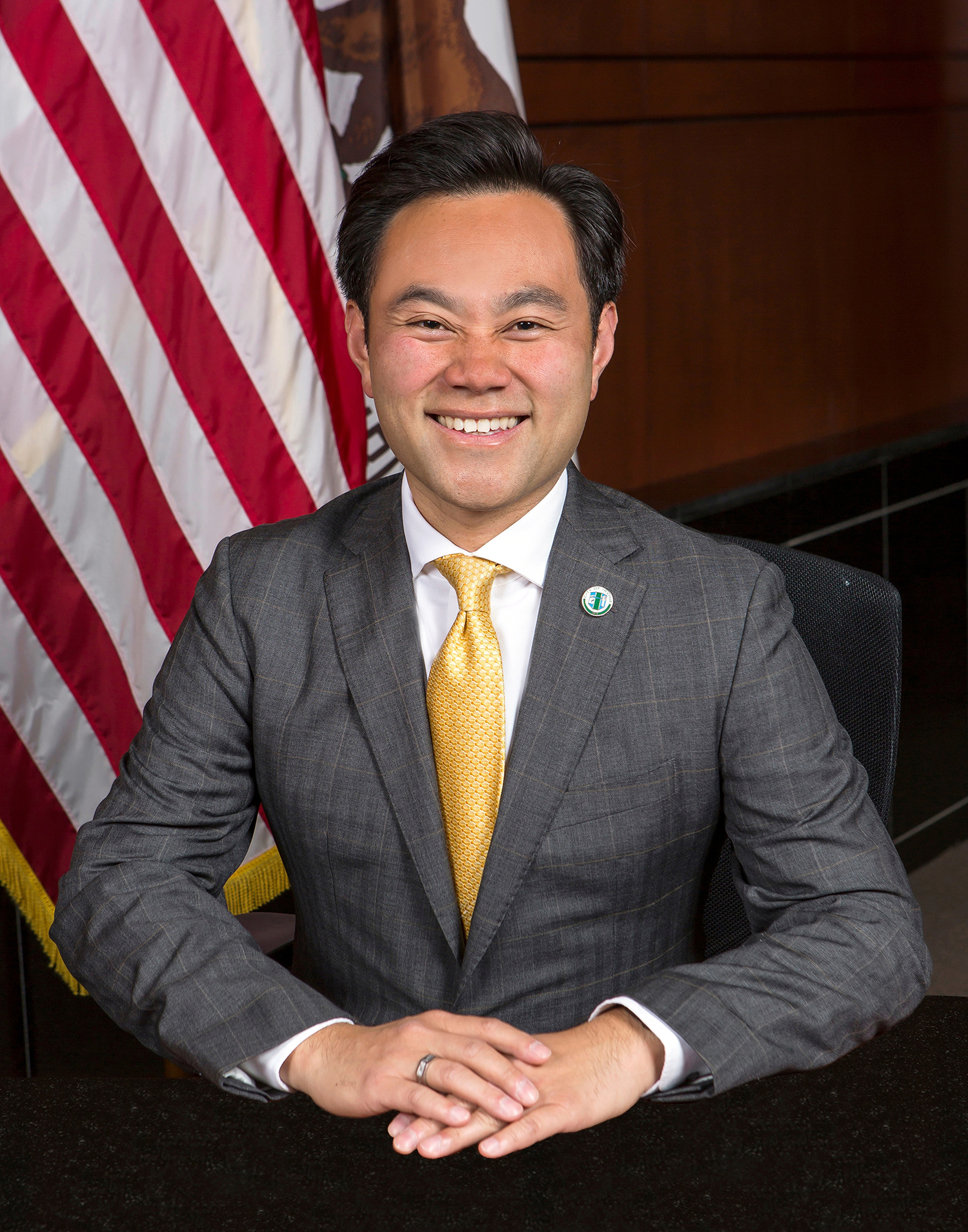
Candidate	Betty Martinez Franco	Anthony Kuo	Dana Cornelius
Popular vote	3,883	3,305	776
Percentage	48.76%	41.50%	9.74%
- Precinct results Martinez Franco: 40–50% 50–60% 60–70% Kuo: 40–50% 50–60% No votes
City Councilor before election
District created
City Councilor
Betty Martinez Franco

The District 5 special election was held on April 15, 2025, to fill a vacancy created when Councilmember Larry Agran was elected Mayor of Irvine in the 2024 regular election. Although Agran was elected to the council at-large in 2022, the passage of Measure D in March 2024 transitioned Irvine to a district-based electoral system. Under the measure's provisions, any vacancy caused by the departure of an at-large councilmember residing in Districts 5 or 6 would be filled through a by‑district special election.

District 5 includes the neighborhoods of Rancho San Joaquin, University Park, Westpark, and Woodbridge. The race initially attracted several prominent candidates, including former councilmember Tammy Kim, who withdrew from the race on February 7 after being removed from the ballot by court order following a residency challenge.

In May 2025, the Orange County District Attorney's Office announced formal charges against Kim—including ten felony counts and one misdemeanor—for allegedly lying about her residency while serving on the City Council and running for mayor and council. The charges include perjury by declaration, filing false documents, aiding illegal casting of votes, nominating fraud, and voter registration fraud. If convicted, Kim faces up to eleven years and two months in prison and a lifetime ban from holding public office.

Betty Martinez Franco, a small business owner, was elected to the council, defeating former councilmember Anthony Kuo and homeowners association board member Dana Cornelius. Martinez Franco became the first Latina elected to the Irvine City Council.

=== District vs. At-Large Controversy ===
The decision to hold the special election exclusively within the newly created District 5 boundaries, rather than citywide, drew criticism from election experts and data analysts. Because Larry Agran had been elected to his council seat in 2022 under an at-large system, his term technically represented the entire city until its scheduled expiration in 2026.

Paul Mitchell, vice president of Political Data Inc., argued that Irvine's use of new district lines to fill an at-large vacancy was inconsistent with the California Fair Maps Act and prior legal opinions from the California Attorney General. Mitchell noted that according to established CA redistricting principles, a vacancy should be filled using the boundaries in effect at the time the original member was elected. He estimated that by restricting the special election to District 5, approximately 83% of Irvine's citywide electorate was excluded from voting for Agran's replacement. The city proceeded with the district-based election citing specific language in the city charter adopted during Irvine's transition to a district-based system.

=== Candidates ===
==== On Ballot ====
- Betty Martinez Franco (Democratic), small business owner, and former vice chair of Irvine's Diversity, Equity & Inclusion Committee.
- Anthony Kuo (Republican), former Irvine City Councilmember (2018–2022)
- Dana Cornelius (American Independent Party), homeowners association board member

==== Withdrawn ====
- Tammy Kim – former Irvine city councilmember (2020–2024).

==== Fundraising ====
Italics indicate a withdrawn candidate.

Campaign finance reports as of June 30, 2025 (Note: Raised and spent figures reflect campaign activity during calendar year 2025 only and do not include prior periods.)
Candidate	Raised	Spent	Cash on hand
Anthony Kuo (R)	$36,754	$41,997	$30
Betty Martinez Franco (D)	$28,727	$29,302	$0
Tammy Kim (D)	$21,817	$32,848	$0
Dana Cornelius (AI)	no filing	no filing	no filing
Source: City of Irvine

=== Polling ===
Poll source	Date(s) administered	Sample size (Note: Key: A – all adults RV – registered voters LV – likely voters V – unclear)	Margin of error	Dana Cornelius (AI)	Anthony Kuo (R)	Betty Martinez Franco (D)	Undecided
CA 120	March 12, 2025	130 (RV)	± 9%	5%	19%	14%	63%

=== Results ===
2025 Irvine City Council District 5 special election (Short Term)
Candidate	Votes	%
Betty Martinez Franco	3,883	48.8
Anthony Kuo	3,305	41.5
Dana Cornelius	776	9.7
Total votes	7,964	100
Invalid or blank votes	39	0.5

=== Results by Neighborhood ===
Legend
Neighborhoods won by Martinez Franco
Neighborhoods won by Kuo

Results by neighborhood (Note: Each neighborhood is based on the City of Irvine's planning area map with planning areas that spread across multiple districts being noted.)
Neighborhood	Martinez Franco		Kuo		Cornelius		Margin		Total votes
Neighborhood	Votes	%	Votes	%	Votes	%	Votes	%	Total votes
Rancho San Joaquin	210	51.72%	169	41.63%	27	6.65%	41	10.10%	406
University Park (Partial)	761	53.03%	554	38.61%	120	8.36%	207	14.42%	1,435
Westpark	831	54.99%	576	41.63%	115	6.65%	255	17.15%	1,522
Woodbridge	2,081	45.33%	2,006	43.70%	514	11.20%	75	1.63%	4,591
Total	3,883	48.76%	3,305	41.50%	776	9.74%	578	7.26%	7,964
