= Orange County Power Authority =

Agency overview
- Formed: 2021
- Type: Community Choice Aggregation
- Jurisdiction: Government of Orange County, California
- Agency executive: Joe Mosca, CEO
- Website: https://www.ocpower.org/

The Orange County Power Authority (abbreviated to OCPA) is a joint powers authority in Orange County, California currently serving Buena Park, Irvine, Fullerton, and Fountain Valley. It is a community choice aggregation, purchasing power on behalf of ratepayers, while Southern California Edison operates local transmission, infrastructure, and billing. OCPA purchases an equivalent amount of energy that customers use and puts it on the California electric grid, for which CAISO balances supply and demand.

It currently procures renewable energy from solar, wind, geothermal, hydroelectric, and biomass sources. OCPA offers three energy plan options for customers to choose the one that meets their environmental and financial needs. For 2025, the plan options are "100% Renewable", "Smart Choice" at 55% renewable energy + 40% carbon-free energy, and "Basic Choice" at 47% renewable energy.

== History ==
In 2018, the City of Irvine was the first municipality in Orange County to explore a CCA program. The Irvine City Council approved the initial funding to formally establish the Orange County Power Authority in 2021. Soon after, the cities of Buena Park, Fullerton, and Huntington Beach joined OCPA. Service began for commercial customers in April 2022 and residential customers in October 2022. In May 2023, Huntington Beach voted to withdraw from the OCPA, which was completed on July 1, 2024.

In February 2023, the California State Auditor conducted an audit, highlighting lack of board oversight and qualified staff, and the loss of customers, and poor administrative processes. 3 other audits were conducted with similar results. In a split vote after audits found Probolsky approved $1.8 million in contracts without board approval In April 2023, the OCPA Board voted to remove CEO Brian Probolsky and promote Joe Mosca, Director of Communications and External Affairs, to Interim CEO.

OCPA completed its improvement plan following all State Auditor recommendations, which included improving transparency and oversight, improved processes for reviewing contracting proposals to ensure fair bidding and track project completion, and hiring of qualified personnel for power procurement and administration.

In 2024, Irvine threatened to withdraw from the Orange County Power Authority, in a unanimous vote to withdraw on December 12, 2024. However, no action was taken to begin the legal withdrawal process. This withdrawal was cancelled as the withdrawal letter was rescinded on September 12, 2025 in a 5-2 vote, with the mayor Larry Agran wishing to exit the authority.

Cities across Orange County are considering joining OCPA.

== See also ==
- Kathleen Treseder, PhD
