= Woodbridge High School (Irvine, California) =

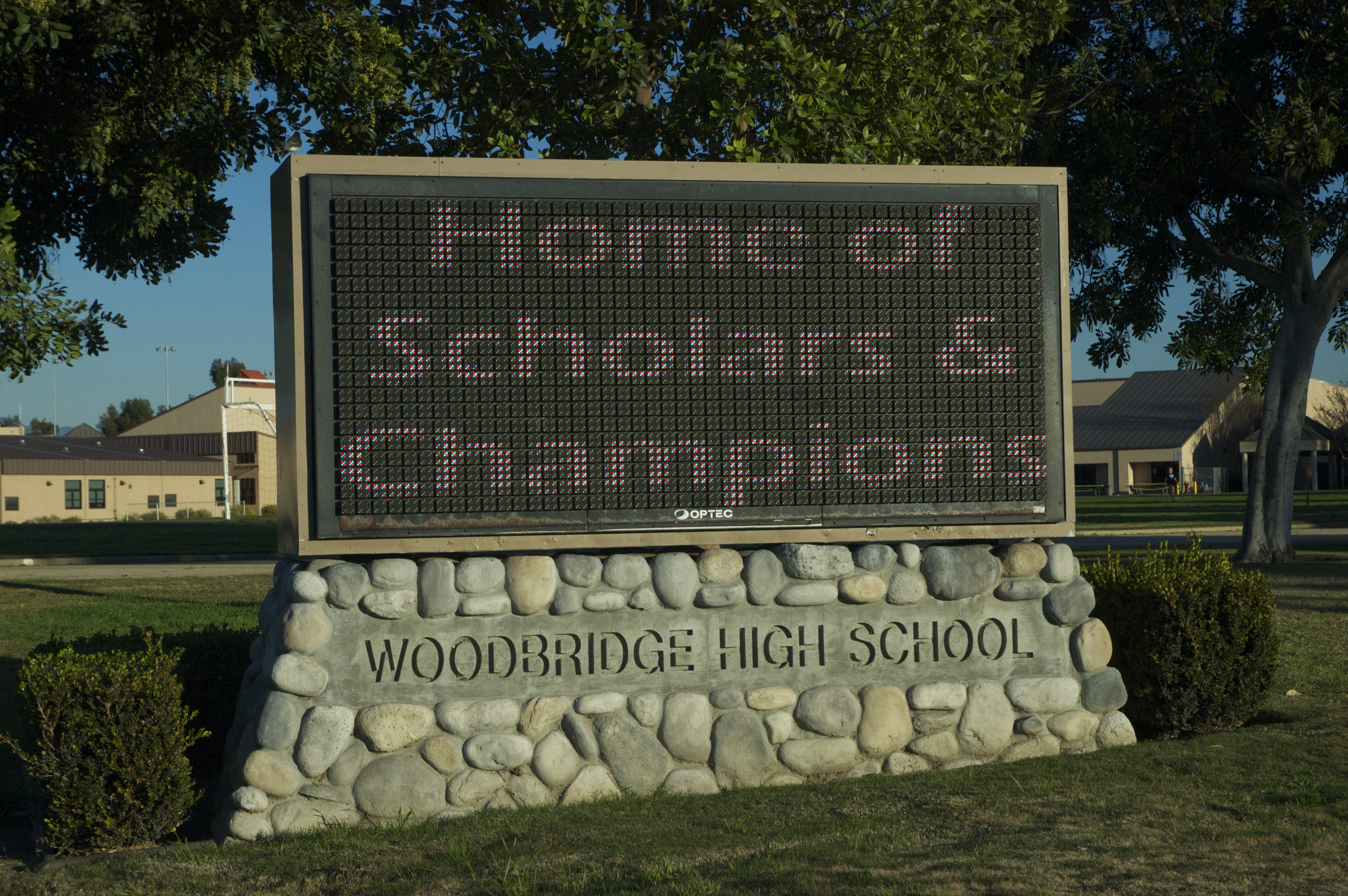

Location
- 2 Meadowbrook; Irvine, California 92604; 33.6784°N 117.80674°W

Information
- School type: Public High School
- Founded: 1980
- Superintendent: Cassie Parham
- School number: 051274
- Principal: Linzi Gorzycki
- Teaching staff: 88.70 (FTE)
- Grades: 9–12
- Enrollment: 2,224 (2023–2024)
- Student to teacher ratio: 25.07
- Colors: Red and Gold
- Athletics conference: Pacific Coast League
- Team name: Warriors
- Newspaper: The Golden Arrow
- Affiliation: Irvine Unified School District
- Website: woodbridgehigh.iusd.org

Woodbridge High School (WHS) is a public high school located in Irvine, California, United States, serving grades 9–12. Woodbridge is in the Irvine Unified School District. Founded in 1980, it has an approximate enrollment of 2,400 students. The school is located in the neighborhood of the same name.

Greg Cops was the founding principal and retired in 2002.

The current administrative staff as of 2026 includes principal Linzi Gorzycki.

Woodbridge has had many improvements and renovations. A recent example is the new Aquatic Center which contains a 50 meter by 25 yard swimming pool, portable bleachers, restroom facilities and locker rooms. A new theater and a new synthetic track and turf field has also been constructed as of May 2021.

Of note, the 1989 movie Gleaming the Cube starring Christian Slater was filmed partially at Woodbridge High School.

== Academic teams and extracurricular activities ==
Woodbridge offers a strong array of extracurricular academic organizations and hosts an annual Academic Teams Banquet.

The Woodbridge High Entertainment Corps represented the state of California in 2010 in the Field Show International competition held in Washington D.C., taking first place in the Nation. The school's percussion ensemble is also considered one of the best in the nation. In 2012 the ensemble swept the World Championships in the concert division with a record setting score of 99.6 out of 100.

The school's chapter of the National Junior Classical League is one of the top in the nation. Woodbridge hosts an annual Certamen invitational and regularly hosts Southern California Regional Amici Madness and the California Junior Classical League Convention. Multiple Woodbridge students have served as officers at the state and national levels of JCL.

The Academic Decathlon team is one of the most prestigious academic teams at Woodbridge High School. In 2006, they won the Orange Country Academic Decathlon and won seven more times over the course of eight years from 2017 to 2024. The Academic Decathlon team reached the state finals of the California Academic Decathlon in 2006, 2007, and every year from 2012 to 2024. It was ranked as 1st in Division III in 2012, 8th in Division II in 2013, 1st in Division II in 2014, and 3rd in Division I in both 2022 and 2023 among around 70 schools competing at the state level every year.

The robotics team currently competes in the FIRST Tech Challenge as the 9040 STEAMpunks. The STEAMpunks frequently engage in outreach activities to local elementary and middle schools, such as Springbrook Elementary School, Stone Creek Elementary School, and Lakeside Middle School. Originally, Woodbridge High School boasted a nationally competitive FIRST Robotics Competition Team under the name of 1047 Echoes, but died down due to a series of financial cuts and declining participation.

The Model United Nations team has won many significant awards (Best Delegate, Commendations, Research). The Woodbridge MUN team has competed in numerous local high school and college conferences as well.

Woodbridge also sponsors National History Day, Mock Trial, Science Bowl, Ocean Sciences Bowl, competitive basket-weaving, Science Olympiad, and FIRST Robotics Teams. In January 2012 the Science Bowl team won first place at the JPL regional competition and went on to compete nationally in Washington DC that April.

== Athletics ==
Woodbridge High School offers a variety of athletic teams

Fall Sports: Golf (Girls), Cross Country, Football, Tennis (Girls), Water Polo (Girls and Boys), Volleyball (Girls)

Winter Sports: Basketball (Girls and Boys), Soccer (Girls and Boys), Water Polo (Girls), Wrestling

Spring Sports: Lacrosse (Boys and Girls), Softball (Girls), Baseball (Boys), Track and Field (Boys and Girls), Swimming (Boys and Girls), Tennis (Boys), Golf (Boys), Volleyball (Boys)

Woodbridge High School also has competitive dance, cheerleading, and Color Guard teams that practice all year long.

== Visual and performing arts ==
WHS offers a variety of programs in the Arts. Performing arts include vocal music, instrumental music, dance, and theater.

Additionally, WHS offers a range of visual arts, including ceramics and photography. There is also a film production program, which is a part of FilmEd* Academy of the Arts. The Theatre program produces multiple shows per year and goes to several festivals.

== Neighborhoods served ==
- Woodbridge (Home neighborhood)
- Westpark
- Oak Creek

== Notable alumni ==
- Christine Babcock, cross country and distance track runner
- Chris Burgess, professional basketball player in Europe
- Austin Daye, basketball player, Atlanta Hawks
- Tom Dumont, professional musician, No Doubt
- Kevin Friedland (born 1981), soccer player
- Georgia Hardstark, television personality, and podcast host of My Favorite Murder
- Adam Keefe, former NBA player for the Atlanta Hawks and Utah Jazz
- Kazu Kibuishi, graphic novel writer/illustrator
- Lauren Lyster, Journalist and news anchor
- Michael McClune, professional tennis player
- Nick Nash, college football player
- Derrick Odum, college football coach
- Geoffrey Okamoto, economist and senior Treasury Department official
- Alex Parsons, offensive lineman, Oakland Raiders
- Kira Peikoff, novelist and journalist
- Andrea Seigel, novelist and screenwriter
- Natasha Watley, Olympic and professional softball player
- Madeleine Westerhout, former special assistant to the President of the United States, executive assistant to the President of the United States
- Shinya Kadono, Japanese soccer player
