= Advanced Technology & Education Park =

College campus in Tustin, California, US

- Type: Public, community college
- Established: 2007
- Chancellor: Raghu P. Mathur, Ed.D.
- President: Glenn R. Roquemore, Irvine Valley College
- Vice-Chancellor: Dr. Robert S. Bramucci, Vice Chancellor of Technology and Learning Services
- Provost: Dr. Randy Peebles
- Dean: Rocky Cifone
- Students: 1,250
- Location: Red Hill and Valencia, Tustin, California, United States; 33°43′00″N 117°49′53″W
- Website: www.atep.us

The Advanced Technology & Education Park (ATEP) is a part of the California Community Colleges system. It is a satellite campus for both Irvine Valley College and Saddleback College, serving the South Orange County Community College District. Opened in 2007, the campus offers programs in design model making/rapid protyping, laser photonics, network security and foreign languages.

== Programs ==
ATEP's Center for Applied Competitive Technologies (CACT) is designated a National Center for Photonics Education, a National Science Foundation Center of Excellence.

== Campus and surroundings ==
The Advanced Technology & Education Park is located on 68 acres (280,000 m^{2}) of the Tustin Legacy redevelopment project, formerly the Marine Corps Air Station Tustin, in Tustin, Orange County, California.

== College statistics ==
The school is on a calendar semester system, with fall semester, spring semester, and summer sessions.

== Affiliations ==
The school is a National Center for Photonics Education, a National Science Foundation Center of Excellence.
