= Serita Frey =

American academic, ecologist, and professor

Serita D. Frey
- Education: Colorado State University; University of Virginia
- Scientific career
- Workplaces: University of New Hampshire
- Thesis: Genetic relatedness and competition between strains of rhizobium leguminosarum biovar phaseoli (1992)
- Website: Frey Lab

Serita D. Frey is an American academic and ecologist, who serves as Professor of Environmental Science at the University of New Hampshire. Her research considers how human activities impact terrestrial ecosystems.

== Early life and education ==
Frey studied ecology at Colorado State University. She was awarded a Colorado State Francis Clark Soil Biology Scholarship to study agricultural management practices and how they influence soil microorganisms. She moved to the University of Virginia for doctoral research, where she studied relationships between strains of rhizobium leguminosarum biovar phaseoli.

== Research and career ==
Frey studies how anthropogenic stressors impact terrestrial ecosystems. She is particularly interested in soil biota (the composition of soil microbial communities) and nutrient cycling. Frey studies how humans have impacted climate change, invasive species and nitrogen deposition, and how this impacts soil and nutrients. She has conducted experiments at the Harvard Forest Long-term Ecological Research site with a number of notable graduate students and postdocs including Adriana Romero-Olivares.

Frey is one of the most highly cited ecologists in the world. She serves as Editor-in-Chief of Issues in Ecology.

== Awards and honors ==
- 2011 University of New Hampshire Outstanding Associate Professor Award
- 2020 Elected Fellow of the American Association for the Advancement of Science
- 2020 Elected Fellow of the Ecological Society of America

== Selected publications ==
- J. Six; S. D. Frey; R. K. Thiet; K. M. Batten (2006). "Bacterial and Fungal Contributions to Carbon Sequestration in Agroecosystems". Soil Science Society of America Journal. 70 (2): 555. doi:10.2136/sssaj2004.0347. ISSN 0361-5995. Wikidata Q62082799.
- Robert L Sinsabaugh; Christian L Lauber; Michael N Weintraub; et al. (25 September 2008). "Stoichiometry of soil enzyme activity at global scale". Ecology Letters. 11 (11): 1252–1264. doi:10.1111/j.1461-0248.2008.01245.x. ISSN 1461-023X. PMID 18823393. Wikidata Q44803491.
- Richard T. Conant; Michael G. Ryan; Göran I. Ågren; et al. (2 August 2011). "Temperature and soil organic matter decomposition rates - synthesis of current knowledge and a way forward". Global Change Biology. 17 (11): 3392–3404. doi:10.1111/j.1365-2486.2011.02496.x. ISSN 1354-1013. Wikidata Q56942677.
