= Alex Parsons (American football) =

American football player (born 1987)

No. 67
- Position: Center

Personal information
- Born: September 14, 1987 (age 39); Charleston, West Virginia, U.S.
- Listed height: 6 ft 4 in (1.93 m)
- Listed weight: 301 lb (137 kg)

Career information
- High school: Woodbridge (Irvine, California)
- College: Southern California
- NFL draft: 2010: undrafted

Career history
- Oakland Raiders (2010−2012); Cleveland Browns (2014)*; New Orleans Saints (2014)*
- * Offseason or practice squad member only

Career NFL statistics
- Games played: 16
- Games started: 1
- Stats at Pro Football Reference

Alex Parsons (born September 14, 1987) is an American former professional football player who was a center in the National Football League (NFL). He played college football for the USC Trojans.

== Early life ==
Parsons attended Woodbridge High School in Irvine, California. As a junior in 2004, he made All-Seaview League while posting 102 tackles, 7 sacks, 4 forced fumbles and 2 interceptions. He played 3 years on the varsity. He made 2005 Super Prep All-American, Prep Star All-American, Super Prep All-Farwest, Prep Star All-Western, Long Beach Press-Telegram Best in the West honorable mention, Orange County Register Fab 15 second-team, Tacoma News-Tribune Western 100, Cal-Hi Sports All-State second-team, CaliFlorida Bowl Defensive MVP, All-CIF Southern Section first-team, All-CIF Division VI first-team, Orange County Register All-Orange County first-team and All-Seaview League first-team as a senior defensive lineman, linebacker, tight end and offensive lineman at Woodbridge High School in Irvine, California. He had 104 tackles, 18 tackles for loss and 4 sacks in 2005.

== College career ==
Parsons played at the University of Southern California (USC).

2008: Parsons started USC's last 10 games at right offensive guard as a junior in 2008 after serving as a key backup there in the first 3 contests. He also appeared on special teams.

2007: As a sophomore in 2007, Parsons was switched from defensive tackle to offensive tackle in 2007 fall camp. He saw action in all 13 games on special teams (primarily on kickoff return) and limited action as a backup on the offensive line (against Idaho, Notre Dame, UCLA and Illinois). He made a tackle against Idaho (following an interception). He had arthroscopic surgery on torn cartilage in his right knee prior to 2007 spring practice.

2006: Parsons was a reserve freshman defensive tackle in 2006, his first year at USC. He appeared in all 13 games in 2006, primarily on special teams. He saw limited action at defensive tackle in 2 games (Arkansas, Oregon), but he did not make a tackle. He won USC's Service Team Defensive Player of the Year Award.

== Professional career ==
=== Oakland Raiders ===
Parsons signed as a free agent with the Oakland Raiders after going undrafted in the 2010 NFL draft. On January 3, 2012 signed a future/reserve contract with Oakland Raiders. On August 26, 2013, he was waived/injured by the Raiders. On August 27, 2013, he cleared waivers and was reverted to the Raiders' injured reserve list. On August 28, 2013, he was waived with an injury settlement.

=== Cleveland Browns ===
Parsons signed with the Cleveland Browns on June 9, 2014.

== Personal life ==
He's a sociology major at USC. His brother, B. Jay Parsons, was a defensive end at Kentucky (2004–05).
