= Mike Carroll (politician) =

American politician

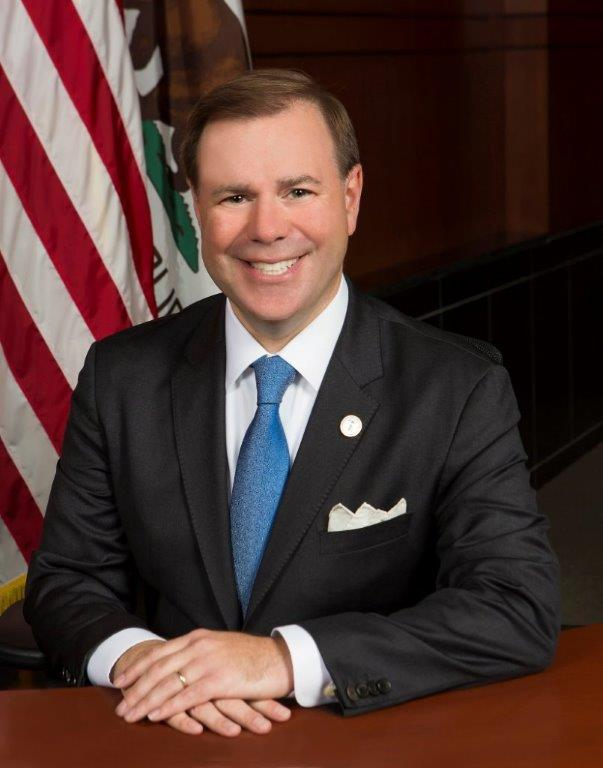

Member of the Irvine City Council
- Incumbent
- Assumed office May 14, 2019
- Constituency: At-large (2019–2024); District 4 (2024–present)

Personal details
- Party: Republican
- Website: mikecarroll.org

Michael Carroll is an American politician and lawyer. A member of the Republican Party, he has been a member of the Irvine City Council in Irvine, California, as well as the Chairman of the Orange County Great Park and the former Vice Mayor. Before joining the city council, Carroll served as Vice Chair of the Irvine Planning Commission and as Chair of the Community Services (Parks & Recreation) Commission. Carroll was appointed to fill a council vacancy in May 2019, and in November 2020 he won a 4-year term as Councilmember, receiving the second highest number of votes in the City’s history.

== Early life and education ==
Carroll was born in New York and grew up in Bellmore, on the south shore of Long Island. He received a Bachelor of Arts in political science from American University in 1994, and a Juris Doctor from St. John’s University School of Law in 1997.

== Legal career ==
After graduating from law school, Carroll joined the corporate department of Willkie Farr & Gallagher in New York City, where he worked from 1998 to 2001. From 2003 to 2005, he was general counsel and senior vice president of Medallion Financial Corporation. He subsequently served as senior counsel at Aames Investment Corporation before establishing his own corporate legal practice, CorpGen Counsel, in 2007. Carroll also undertook pro bono work, including representing the Orange County Rescue Mission, for which he received the President's Volunteer Service Award.

== Political career ==
Carroll was appointed community services commissioner in 2012 and served in that role until 2016. He later served as vice chair of the City of Irvine Planning Commission in 2019. In May 2019, the Irvine City Council appointed him to fill a vacancy created when Mayor Donald P. Wagner was elected to the Orange County Board of Supervisors and Christina Shea assumed the mayoral position. Near the end of 2019, a petition was initiated to recall Mayor Shea and Councilmember Carroll; the effort was abandoned in early 2020 due to the COVID-19 pandemic. In 2020, Carroll was the subject of a complaint regarding his use of city funds, which was later dismissed by the California Fair Political Practices Commission.

Carroll ran in the Irvine City Council election in November 2020; his re-election campaign emphasizing his role in leading the city's free COVID-19 testing program and a proposal to increase use of smart traffic control systems to reduce congestion. At the time he was serving as vice mayor.

In late 2020, the Irvine City Council established and funded the Orange County Power Authority (OCPA) as a community choice energy provider intended to serve as an alternative to Southern California Edison. Carroll served as the agency’s inaugural board chair. He left the board in December 2022 and later supported a proposal for the city to withdraw from the OCPA following an audit that reported instances of financial mismanagement.

In 2023, Carroll participated in negotiations for the acquisition and closure of the All American Asphalt plant in North Irvine to facilitate the creation of an open-space preserve. He and Irvine Mayor Farrah N. Khan also reached an agreement with the University of California, Irvine, to implement transportation infrastructure supporting a new UCI Medical Complex. During the same period, he proposed new hiking trails in South Irvine and led efforts to advance development at the Orange County Great Park, which is projected to become one of the world’s largest municipal parks.

Carroll ran for re-election to the Irvine City Council in November 2024; he was the only incumbent candidate. He identified his top campaign concerns as overdevelopment and community safety. He was re-elected to the Irvine City Council in November 2024. Following the election, newly elected mayor Larry Agran proposed to nominate him to serve as vice mayor, but Carroll declined, citing the time commitment required for his responsibilities as chair of the Orange County Great Park Board.

== Writing ==
Carroll researched the Plum Island Animal Disease Center, a former U.S. federal facility off the coast of Long Island, for seven years. His book on the topic, Lab 257: The Disturbing Story of the Government’s Secret Plum Island Germ Laboratory (William Morrow, 2004), became a New York Times bestseller. Carroll has also written columns for The Orange County Register and Orange Coast magazine.

== Personal life ==
Mike Carroll is married to Betty Carroll, who was selected to serve as the Irvine Unified School District Board of Education President for one year on December 17, 2019.
