= Portola Springs, Irvine, California =

Planning area in Irvine, California

Portola Springs ‘U∫rónvanga
- Planning area
- Etymology: Named after the expedition of 1769 led by Gaspar de Portolà that camped in Portola Springs near several small springs
- Interactive map of Portola Springs
- Coordinates: 33°41′33″N 117°42′49″W
- Country: United States
- State: California
- County: Orange
- City: Irvine

Portola Springs is a planning area and village (as colloquially referred to by the Irvine Company) in Irvine, California, United States, in the municipal geographic area of Portola.

== History ==
According to the description chiseled on a monument on a hill in Portola Springs, the Portolá expedition camped on that hill in 1769 nearby several small springs that are today known as Portola Springs. The expedition was led by Gaspar de Portolà, a Spanish military officer and the first governor of early California. Their objective was to successfully establish missions along the Californian coast.

Portola Springs was historically inhabited by the Acjachemen people who occupied this area for approximately 10,000 years. It also used to be a tool-manufacturing site and a sacred area to the Acjachemen. The village was called "‘U∫rónvanga" in Luiseño, their indigenous language.

The Irvine Company started developing this area in 2006.

== Geography ==
Porola Springs borders Orchard Hills (PA1) to the northwest; unincorporated areas of Orange County to the northeast; Lake Forest to the east; Great Park (PA51) to the south; and PA9, constituted by Woodbury (PA9A), Stonegate (PA9B & C2), and Woodbury East (PA9C1), to the west; and is surrounded by State Route 241 (SR 241) to the north and State Route 133 (SR 133) to the west. Parts of Portola Springs as a planning area protrude city borders, but they are all within the city's sphere of influence.

== Education ==
Portola Springs is located within the Irvine Unified School District. Schools within Portola Springs include:

- Loma Ridge Elementary School
- Portola Springs Elementary School

== Infrastructure ==
=== Transportation ===
Highways include:

- SR 241
- SR 133

=== Fire authority ===
There is only one fire station in Portola Springs called Fire Station #27, overseen by the Orange County Fire Authority, next to Portola Springs Elementary School.

=== Parks ===
The following parks are located in Portola Springs:

- Center Terrace Park
- Discovery Park
- Greenfield Park
- Lomas Valley Park
- Orchard Trail Park
- Orchard View Park
- Plateau Park
- Portola Springs Community Park
- Ridgeview Park
- Ridgetop Park
- Round Canyon Park
- Silverado Park
- Treetop Park
- Tomato Springs Park
- Valley Vista Park
- Village Park
- Village Square Park
- Voyager Park

There are also several privately owned parks in addition to these.
