= Irvine City Council =

Governing body of Irvine, California

Type
- Type: Unicameral
- Term limits: 2 terms

Leadership
- Mayor: Larry Agran (D) since December 10, 2024
- Vice Mayor: James Mai (R) since January 14, 2025

Structure
- Seats: 7
- Political groups: Officially nonpartisan: Democratic (5); Republican (2)
- Length of term: 4 years, 2 years for mayor

Elections
- Last election: April 15, 2025
- Next election: November 3, 2026

Meeting place
- Irvine City Hall; 1 Civic Center Plaza, Irvine, CA 92606

Website
- Official Website

The Irvine City Council is the governing body for the city of Irvine, California. The city operates under a council–manager form of government with a separately elected mayor and a council-appointed city manager. The council consists of 7 members, one of whom is the mayor. Following the 2024 general elections, Irvine added two additional members and moved from at-large to district elections. A city council members serve a four-year term while the mayor serves a two-year term. Both council members and the mayor are limited to two successive terms.

== Elections ==
Three city council members are elected in single-member districts during every presidential election while the mayor is elected at-large during the same and during the midterm election. The remaining council members are also elected during the midterms in their respective districts. Council members are elected to four-year terms and the mayor is elected for two-year terms. Both the mayor and council members are limited to two terms.

Prior to the 2024 election, Irvine City Council members were elected at-large. However, with voters' approval of Measure D in the March 2024 primary elections, Irvine adopted a district system for its council members, with the mayor being elected city wide. The measure also expanded the council to seven members from its previous five and created six districts for the council members. The city selected the district map prior to Measure D's approval after a city-wide contest.

== Composition ==
The Irvine City Council consists of 5 Democrats and 2 Republicans, although per state law the council is officially nonpartisan.

District	Councilmember	Party (officially nonpartisan)	Term ends
Mayor	Larry Agran	Democratic	2026
District 1	Melinda Liu	Democratic	2026
District 2	William Go	Democratic	2028
District 3	James Mai	Republican	2028
District 4	Mike Carroll	Republican	2028
District 5	Betty Martinez Franco	Democratic	2026
At-large	Kathleen Treseder	Democratic	2026
