= Quail Hill, Irvine, California =

Village in California, United States

Coordinates: 33.650404°N 117.774810°W

Quail Hill is a village in the southern part of Irvine, Orange County, California. It is one of the seven communities that belong to the University area of the City of Irvine. The village's name comes from a distinctive rock formation that adjoins 600 acres (2.4 km^{2}) of open space. Located next to the 405 freeway, Quail Hill is close to major employment, entertainment and dining areas of the city. There are also numerous paved and dirt trails, both throughout the area, as well as connected to the larger trail networks in Irvine.

== Infrastructure ==
=== Parks ===
- Quail Hill Community Park – The park features two lighted baseball fields, three soccer fields, and two lighted basketball courts, along with an open play area and a children’s play area. Amenities include four restrooms, multiple drinking fountains, picnic tables, barbecues, and a covered seating area. Some park amenities, including athletic fields and picnic areas, may be reserved through the City of Irvine. Paved paths connect the park to adjacent neighborhoods and surrounding roadways, and a parking lot by the basketball area provides access for visitors.
- Quail Hill Community Center – Located within the Community Park, with its own larger parking lot, the community center offers indoor facilities including multipurpose rooms, a classroom, an artificial turf area, and an exercise room available for reservation. These spaces can be reserved through the City of Irvine. There are also many covered areas and seats, restrooms, water fountains, and a playground with a statue of a California kingsnake. The center connects directly to multiple nearby hiking trails.

=== Shopping ===
- Quail Hill Shopping Center – Located along Quail Hill Parkway, and comprising approximately 145,000 square feet of retail space. The center includes grocery, dining, service, and financial establishments, currently including: Albertsons, CVS Pharmacy, Bank of America, Chase Bank, Wells Fargo, Starbucks, O Fine Japanese Cuisine, Oliver’s Trattoria, Nalu’s Hawaiian Fish Grill, bb.q Chicken, Pick Up Stix, Johnny’s New York Pizza, La Pho, Natraj’s Tandoori, Sharky’s Woodfired Mexican Grill, Nekter Juice Bar, Pure Barre, Sport Clips, Salon Laurent, Majestic Spa, Images A Luxury Nail Lounge, Coldwell Banker, Edward Jones, AIM Mail Center, Cox Solutions Store, Quail Animal Hospital, South Coast Midwifery & Women’s Health Care, William C. Jaques DDS, My Favorite Cleaners, and The Shoe Clinic. The center also includes a Chevron gas station with an adjacent car wash facility. Amenities include surface parking, electric vehicle charging stations, bicycle parking, and pedestrian-oriented outdoor gathering spaces designed for community use.

=== Fire Station ===
- Station 47 – Station 47 is a career fire station operated by the Orange County Fire Authority. The station operates Medic Engine 47, Engine 347 (cross-staffed), and Dozer 2, providing fire protection, emergency medical services, and wildland response for the surrounding area. The large front parking lot at the station has been occasionally used to land helicopters when transferring patients to ambulances or other purposes.

== Neighborhoods ==
=== Single Family ===
- Sage by California Pacific Homes (Cluster Courtyard) with Robert Hidey Architects
- Vicara by Richmond American Homes - with Robert Hidey Architects
- Linden by William Lyon Homes
- Laurel by William Lyon Homes
- Olivos by California Pacific Homes - with Robert Hidey Architects
- Tapestry by Fieldstone Communities
- Chantilly by Warmington Homes - with Bassenian-Lagoni Architects
- Sienna by Standard Pacific Homes - with Robert Hidey Architects
- Sandalwood by Standard Pacific Homes (Paired and Detached)
- Solstice by Pulte Homes

=== Townhomes ===
- Jasmine by Shea Homes - with William Hezmalhalch Architects
- Casalon by John Laing Homes
- Ivy Wreath by D.R. Horton
- Ambridge by William Lyon Homes
