= Orchard Hills, Irvine, California =

Community in Irvine, CA

Orchard Hills
- Neighborhood
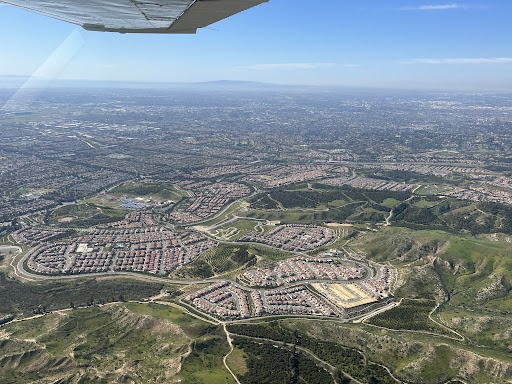
- Orchard Hills from the air, looking west.
- City: Irvine, California, U.S.

Area
  - Total: 21.46 km^{2} (8.29 sq mi)

Population (2019)
  - Total: 990
  - Density: 829.62/km^{2} (2,148.7/sq mi)
- % of Irvine

GDP (PPA; 2021)
  - Per capita: $107,000 USD
- Website: Orchard Hills Irvine Company Page

Orchard Hills is a planned community in Irvine, California. It borders Limestone Canyon Regional Park to the northeast, California State Route 241 to the southeast, the Northwood neighborhood to the southwest, and California State Route 261 to the northwest. Orchard Hills is home to the Rattlesnake and Syphon reservoirs.

== History ==
Orchard Hills was historically inhabited by the Chumash, Alliklik, Kitanemuk, Serrano, Gabrielino Luiseno Cahuilla, and the Kumeyaay tribes, predominantly the Gabrieleno Tribes who are thought to have been Uto-Aztecan speakers. Some researchers believe that the Aztecs descended from California. Orchard Hills is near Irvine Ranch, so it is expected that Gabrieleño farmers and Hunter-gatherers likely farmed acorns, mesquite, Prickly-Pear Cactus, chia seeds, wild cherry, white sage, among other fruits.

=== European colonization ===
From the 17th century to the early 19th century, California was under Spanish rule as Alta California. During this period, the state was limited to trading outposts, villages, forts, and most notably, the Spanish missions in California, which were erected by Junipero Serra. The mission closest to Orchard Hills is San Juan Capistrano, which was founded in 1776.

=== Mexican-American war ===
One of the implications of the Mexican–American War was the Bear Flag Revolt, which disrupted native activity in the area near Orchard Hills.

== Demographics ==
Orchard Hills has a population of 990. Orchard Hills' majority group are Asian Americans who are 68 percent of the population, the rest being 24.1 percent White and 6.7 percent Hispanic/Latino. A majority of Orchard Hills residents are female. In addition, Orchard Hills has the highest percent of children out of the neighborhoods of Irvine.

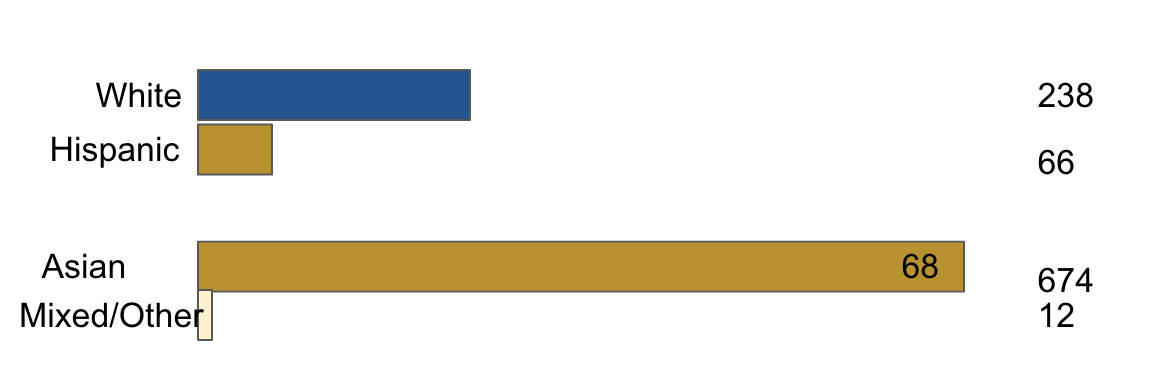
Orchard Hills Race/Ethnicity Chart

== Schools ==
The local public school of Orchard Hills is Orchard Hills School, belonging to the Tustin Unified School District, and the school mascot is a hawk. Orchard Hills School offers various programs such as robotics, AVID 7/8, and various others.
