= University Park, Irvine, California =

University Park
- Neighborhood
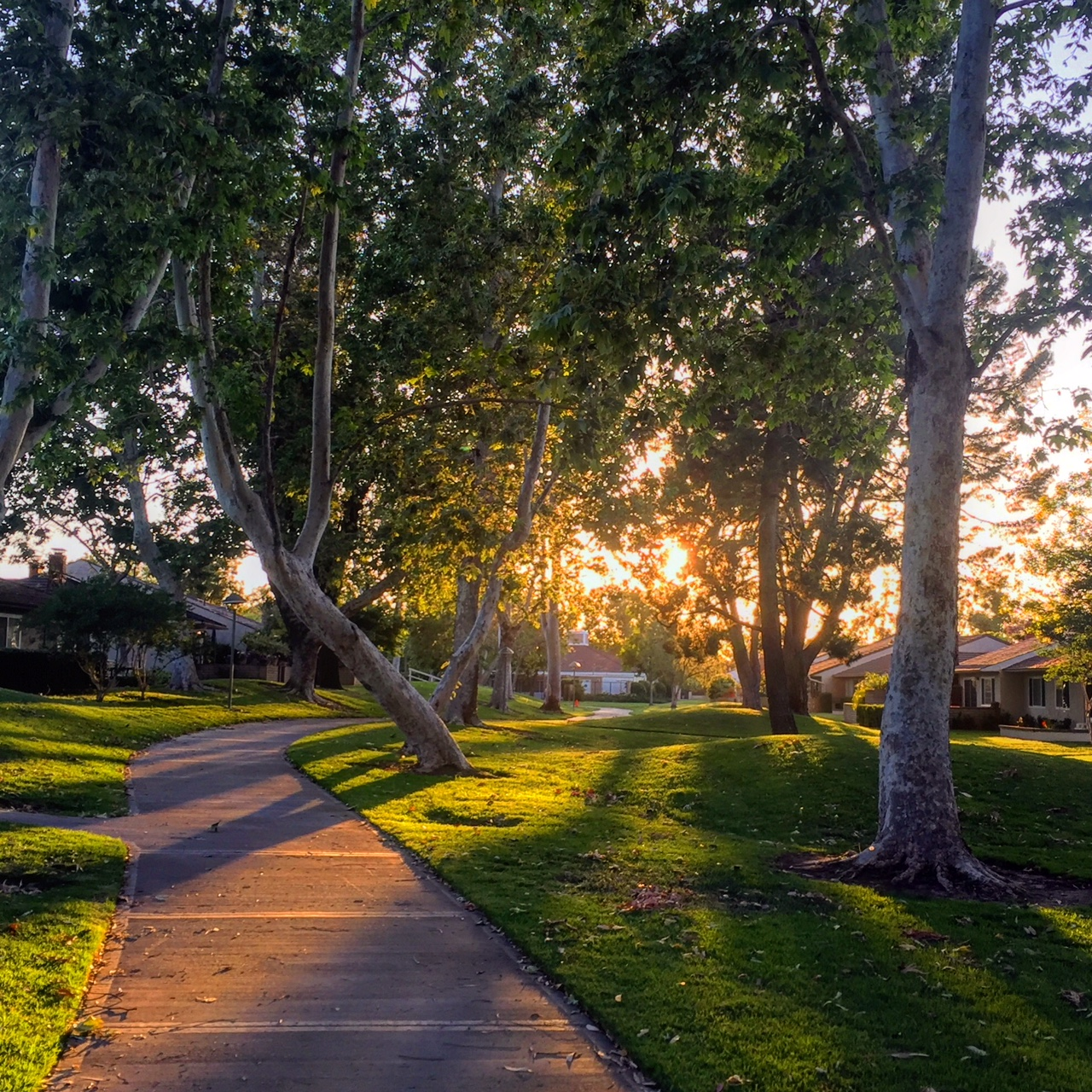
- A typical greenbelt section passing between homes in University Park, Irvine, California.

- Location within the Los Angeles metropolitan area Location within California
- Coordinates: 33°39′45″N 117°48′57″W
- Country: United States
- State: California
- County: Orange
- City: Irvine
- Established: 1965

Area
  - Total: 595 acres (241 ha)
- Time zone: UTC-8
  - Summer (DST): UTC-7
- ZIP: 92612
- Area codes: 714, 949

University Park is a master-planned neighborhood in Irvine, California. It is bounded by University Drive to the south, Culver Drive to the west, and the San Diego (I-405) Freeway to the north. Commercially advertised as Irvine's first "village", the neighborhood was named University Park due to its proximity to the University of California, Irvine. University Park celebrated its 50th anniversary in July 2016.

== History ==
University Park was built in phases beginning in 1965 shortly after plans for a nearby University of California campus were announced. The neighborhood, whose opening predates Irvine's city-hood by five years, was envisioned to attract buyers from a wide range of demographics and was designed to offer various housing types to meet the diverse needs of its target residents. Designed in collaboration with Peter Walker, Dick Law, and Kalvin Platt of Sasaki, Walker and Associates, the neighborhood utilized the Garden City approach to planning by designing clusters of homes to face publicly-accessible park areas and greenbelts tucked away from principal roadways in order to create a lower dependence on automobiles. These greenbelts were also designed to link neighborhoods and amenities in the neighborhood, including schools, shopping centers, the library, and recreation areas. At the time of its construction, the neighborhoods's planning concepts were considered experimental, such as the use of rectangular cul-de-sacs containing greenery in the center. Home sales initially were slow due to the neighborhood's isolation from other built-up areas and also due to the incompletion of the nearby I-405 freeway. However, upon its eventual completion, the neighborhood contained Irvine's first library, high school, and retail shopping center.

== Amenities, facilities, and neighborhoods ==
University Park comprises multiple neighborhoods and associations and contains a high concentration of community facilities and amenities. In addition to its greenbelts and bikeways, the neighborhood contains community facilities, parks, schools, religious institutions, a library, commercial centers, adjacency to open space and recreational areas, and access to transportation.

=== Neighborhoods and associations ===
- University Community Association
- The Terrace Community Association
- Parkside Community Association
- Parkcrest Community Association
- Village Park Community Association
- Parkwood Apartment Homes

=== Schools and library ===
- Rancho San Joaquin Middle School
- University Park Elementary
- Village Montessori
- University Park Library (a branch of Orange County Public Libraries system)

=== Parks and open space and recreational facilities ===
- University Community Park
- Adventure Playground
- Dave Robins Park (private)
- Quail Hill Preserve (access from Shady Canyon Drive in the Quail Hill neighborhood)
- Sand Canyon Wash
- Tanaka Farms
- Strawberry Farms Golf Course
- William R. Mason Regional Park (access from University Drive in the Rancho San Joaquin neighborhood)

=== Religious institutions ===
- Light of Christ Lutheran Church
- University United Methodist Church

=== Commercial centers ===
- University Park Center
- Parkview Center

=== Transportation ===
- Orange County Transportation Authority (OCTA) bus routes
- San Diego (I-405) Freeway
- San Joaquin Hills (SR-73) Transportation Corridor (2.1 miles west via University Drive)
- John Wayne Airport (2.3 miles west via Michelson Drive)
