= Kathleen Treseder =

American ecologist

Kathleen Kay Treseder
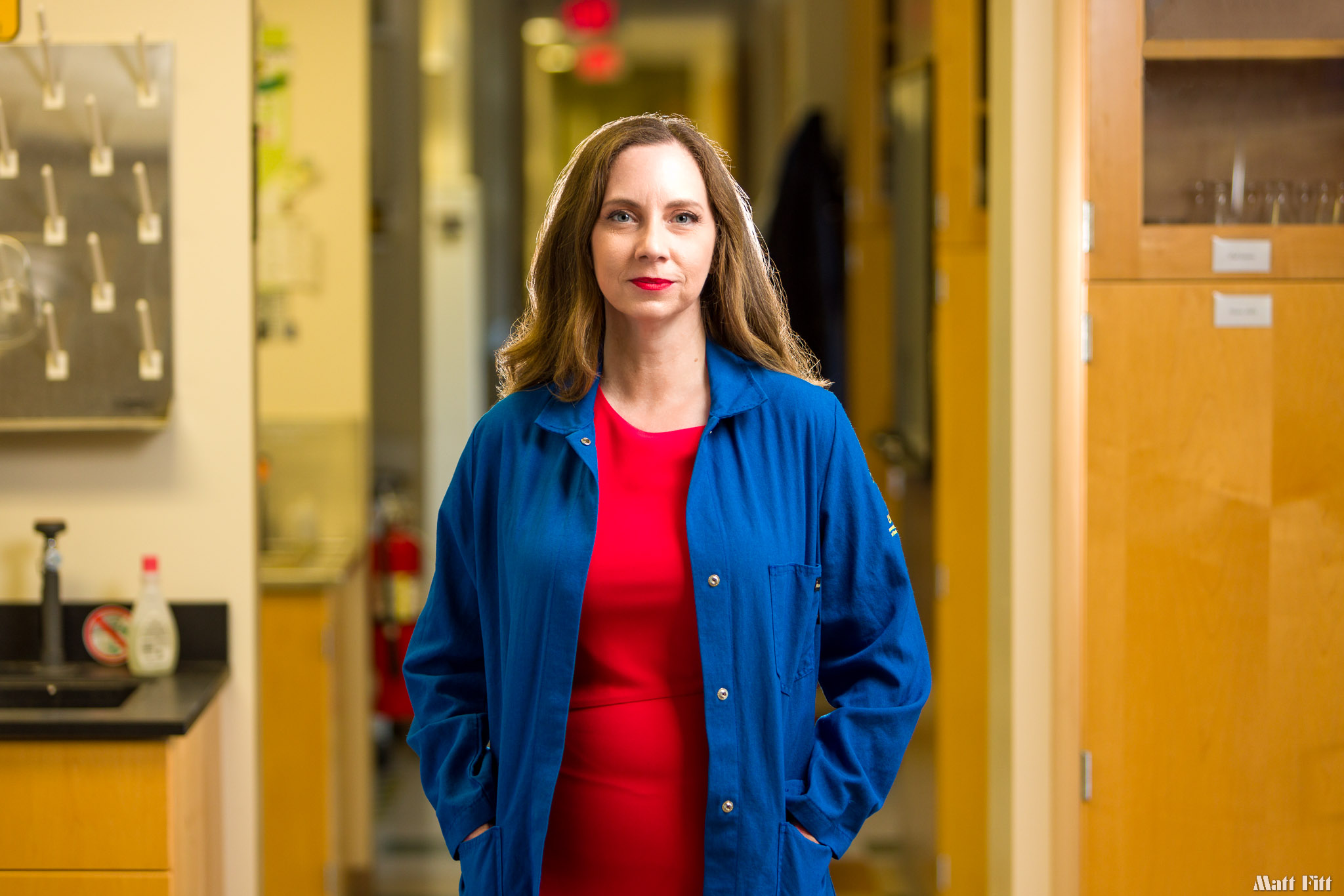
- Dr. Kathleen Treseder in her research lab at UC Irvine, May 24, 2022.

Member of the Irvine City Council
- Incumbent
- Assumed office December 13, 2022
- Constituency: At-large

Personal details
- Born: Kathleen Kay Treseder
- Party: Democratic
- Education: University of Utah, Stanford University
- Known for: The interplay between global climate change and fungal ecology
- Scientific career
- Fields: Ecology
- Workplaces: University of California, Irvine (2003-present)
- Doctoral advisor: Peter Morrison Vitousek

Kathleen Kay Treseder is an American ecologist who specializes in the interplay between global climate change and fungal ecology. She also serves as a member of the Irvine City Council after being elected to the position in 2022. She is currently a professor in the Department of Ecology and Evolutionary Biology at the University of California, Irvine. She is a Fellow of the American Association for the Advancement of Science, the American Academy of Microbiology, and the Ecological Society of America.

As an undergraduate she co-authored a research paper that was published in Nature and was featured on the cover of the issue. Since then, Treseder has published over 90 peer-reviewed scientific papers that have been cited over 19,000 times.

== Education and academic appointments ==
Treseder graduated from the University of Utah in 1994 with an Honors Bachelors of Science in biology with a minor in chemistry. She obtained her Ph.D. in biological sciences from Stanford University in 1999, her dissertation title was “Plant-soil interactions across a fertility gradient in Hawaii : nutrient acquisition strategies and effects of genetic variation on ecosystem function” and her primary advisor was Peter Morrison Vitousek. She was a postdoctoral fellow at the University of California, Riverside, from 1999 to 2000. She was an assistant professor in the Department of Biology at the University of Pennsylvania from 2001 to 2003, before moving to the Department of Ecology and Evolutionary Biology at the University of California, Irvine in 2003. She became an associate professor in 2006, and a full professor in 2011.

== Activism work ==
Treseder was an integral part of the initial anti-sexual harassment initiative in UC Irvine and continues to be a strong proponent for gender equality and safe working spaces in STEM, often using #STEMtoo on social media platforms.

Beginning in November 2017, Treseder along with 3 other identified members of the School of Biology, Jessica Pratt, Benedicte Shipley, and Michelle Herrera, filed official complaints of sexual harassment against Francisco Ayala, an evolutionary biologist, eventually leading to Ayala’s termination with the university.

== Irvine City Council ==
Treseder was sworn in as a board member of the Orange County Power Authority on January 17, 2023.

== Honors and awards ==
Treseder was a Chancellor's Fellow at the University of California, Irvine from 2012 to 2015. In 2015, she was chosen as a United States representative for the publication Young Women Scientists: A Bright Future for the Americas, 2015, InterAmerica Network of Academies of Sciences.
