= South Orange County Community College District =

Public community college district in California

South Orange County Community College District (SOCCCD)
- Type: Public community college
- Established: 1967; 59 years ago
- Parent institution: California Community Colleges
- Budget: $1.3 billion (2022-2023)
- Chancellor: Julianna Barnes
- Students: 35,553 (Spring 2022)
- Location: 28000 Marguerite Parkway; Mission Viejo, California, United States; 33.5551428°N 117.6636847°W
- Website: socccd.edu

South Orange County Community College District (SOCCCD) is a public community college district in Orange County, California. It was founded in 1967 and has three separate campuses: Saddleback College in Mission Viejo, California, Irvine Valley College in Irvine, California and the Advanced Technology & Education Park in Tustin, California. The district is governed by a seven-member elected board of trustees and a chancellor. Located north of San Diego County and stretching from the Santa Ana Mountains to the Pacific Ocean, the district's 382-square-mile (990 km^{2}) service area encompasses the southern half of Orange County.

== Board of trustees ==
The SOCCCD Board of Trustees is composed of seven trustees elected by the registered voters of the communities of south Orange County and one student member elected by the student body of Irvine Valley College and Saddleback College. Trustees, with the exception of the student member, are elected to four-year terms commencing December of the year elected. As terms are staggered, elections are held every two years in connection with the general election. The seven locally elected trustees must reside in one of seven districts.

In January 2025, Trustee Terri Whitt Rydell was formally censured by the Board of Trustees following allegations that she disclosed confidential information from a closed session, in violation of California’s Brown Act. The censure resolution, adopted by a 6–0 vote, removed her from all board committees and barred her from participating in future closed sessions.
