= Woodbridge, Irvine, California =

Housing development in California, United States

Coordinates: 33.677104°N 117.800903°W

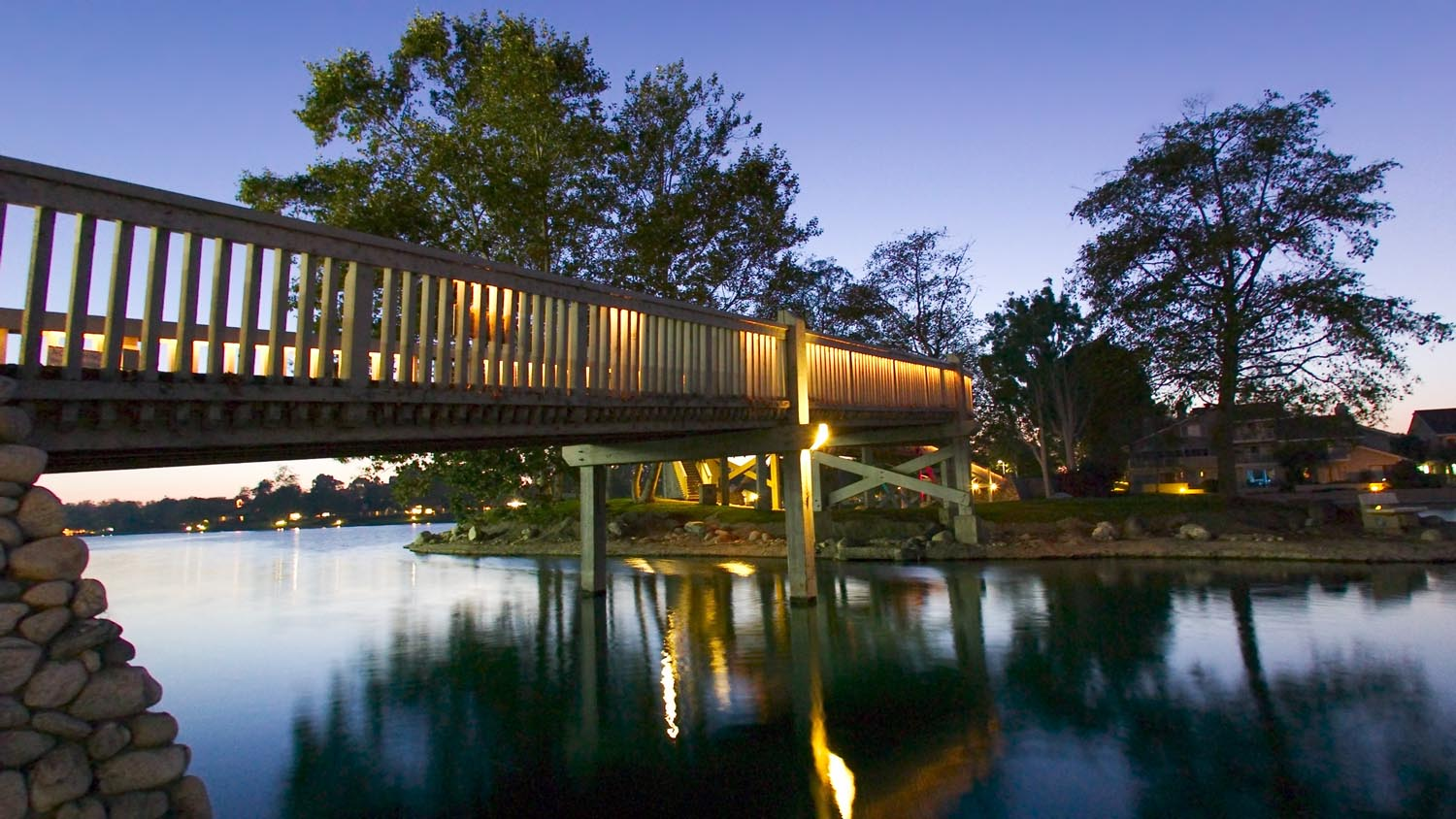
Bridge across North Lake in Woodbridge, Irvine, California.

Woodbridge is a large suburban housing development, begun in 1975 by the Irvine Company, in the central region of Irvine, California. It covers 2.65 square miles and has two large artificial lakes at its center. It contains four public elementary schools, two public middle schools (Lakeside and South Lake), and Woodbridge High School. Most of the developments were completed by the mid-1990s. In 2013, development began on the first new housing tract in 15 years, consisting of 48 new homes called The Branches.

== Location and boundaries ==
Woodbridge is bounded by Irvine Center Drive to the north, Culver Drive to the west, Jeffrey Road to the east and the Interstate 405 to the south. One of Irvine's many suburban neighborhoods known as "villages", Woodbridge is bordered by the Villages of Westpark to its West, El Camino Real to its North, Oak Creek to its East, and University Park to its South.

== Style and layout ==
Woodbridge is bisected into two residential segments, called North Lake and South Lake, by the retail and business district. The street named Yale Loop encircles the entirety of Woodbridge. Each residential segment of Woodbridge has a lake at its center. The lakes are between three and six feet deep and each is crossed by a large wooden footbridge, owing the village its name. The village is walled off from the rest of Irvine by a row of pine trees and a continuous, 20-foot (6.1 m)-high Privet hedge. Woodbridge, for the most part, is uniformly designed in a New England Cape Cod style.

In Great Streets by Allan B. Jacobs, Pinewood (on the Northern edge of the village off the Yale Loop) is cited as one of the great "new urban" streets. Though the suburban style of place makes it difficult to take the "urban" designation seriously, Mr. Jacobs remarks on its gentle curvilinear aspect; there is no other street in Woodbridge that has the same characteristics. The tract in which Pinewood is the only circular street, it is also noted for its relatively profuse vegetation, particularly rich use of pepper trees, and the natural shake roofs which, in other tracts, have been replaced by steel or cement imitating other materials.

== Woodbridge Village Association ==
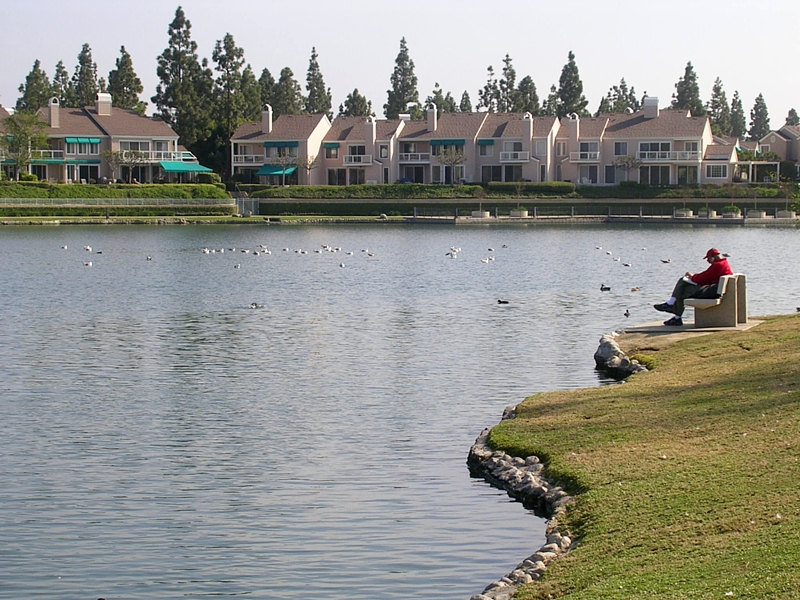
The artificial North and South Woodbridge Lakes attract visitors with its shoreline pedestrian trails and opportunities for light water recreation.

Concurrent with opening sales of homes in Woodbridge, the Irvine Company established the Woodbridge Village Association ("WVA"). Headquartered out of the community facility located at 31 Creek Road, the WVA is a master homeowner association, maintaining the commonly owned pools, parks, lakes and trails within the Village. Smaller "sub" associations maintain individual neighborhoods within Woodbridge.

The WVA has a board of directors, elected from the homeowner's membership of Woodbridge. Due to the Village's large size, and the number of people subject to the authority of the board, coupled with the size of the WVA's budget and staff, the board and WVA are really not unlike a city council and a small city as opposed to a board for a small homeowner's association. Adding to this perception, WVA normally holds community events much like a small town during holidays of the year, such as an annual Independence Day parade, events and fireworks.

All homeowners are required to become members when purchasing a home and are required to pay association dues for maintenance and upkeep of common areas. The WVA provides a number of services to maintain the community facilities including landscaping; maintenance; lifeguard services during the peak summer season at the larger swim and lake facilities (including small facilities with diving boards); and a security patrol known as Facility Inspectors- part of its community relations department - that patrols and ensures safety at its facilities.

The WVA requires homeowners to submit applications for any home additions or changes to paint colors, to ensure the integrity and uniformity of colors and themes within the Village. The WVA is sometimes criticized for its authoritarianism, like many homeowner associations.

== Lakes and facilities ==
The amenities include two lakes with docks, two beach lagoons, 22 pools (two of which are only for adults), 16 spas, 13 waders, 24 tennis courts, a splash pad, numerous parks with play equipment, volleyball courts, a big wheel park, horseshoe facilities, and a fitness course. All told, the association owns and operates 41 recreational facilities.

Each of Woodbridge's two lakes has a "beach club" next to it, where there is a "lagoon" (a sand-surrounded fresh-water swimming pool that empties into the lake), a dock facility to rent human-driven pedal boats, kayaks, canoes, sailboats, and hydro-bikes. Swimming in the lakes is prohibited for insurance reasons. The beach clubs have two volleyball courts each. South lake has a recreation room and a snack shop in it also, which is only open on the 4th of July and Memorial Day.

There are also two "swim clubs," Stone Creek and Blue Lake. Stone Creek Swim Club is located in the northernmost section of Woodbridge, while Blue Lake Swim Club is located in the southernmost section of Woodbridge. These have lifeguards all day 10am-10pm during summer, and weekends 11am-4pm during fall/spring and 12pm-5pm during winter. Stone Creek has a two-meter diving board, and Blue Lake has a one-meter and a three-meter diving board. The Woodbridge swim teams are based out of Stone Creek. In addition, Fallbrook and Woodflower pools have lifeguards from 10am-5pm only during the summer. Ashwood has lifeguards like Blue Lake and Stone Creek from 11am-4pm including in the summer.

Twenty-four tennis courts, twenty of which are lit for night play, four pickleball courts, pathways, bikeways, and a plethora of recreational parks within the four square miles make Woodbridge a community of interest to young families as well as retirees who enjoy outdoor activities. Its community tennis club trains young residents and involves old residents alike.

== Education ==
Woodbridge is served by the Irvine Unified School District. There is one high school in Woodbridge: Woodbridge High School. There are two public middle schools: Lakeside and South Lake. Stone Creek, Meadow Park, Springbrook and Eastshore are the four public elementary schools. All of them are California Distinguished, and all were named Blue Ribbon Schools.

Woodbridge High School also participates in the United States Academic Decathlon.
