= Tustin (disambiguation) =

Tustin is a city in Southern California.

Tustin may also refer to:

== Places ==
United States

- Tustin Legacy, Tustin, California, a master-planned community
- Tustin Ranch, Tustin, California, a master-planned community
- North Tustin, California, unincorporated area north of the City of Tustin
- Tustin, Michigan
- Tustin, Wisconsin, an unincorporated community

== Other uses ==
- Tustin (surname), a surname
- Tustin High School
- Tustin (Metrolink station)
- Tustin Unified School District
- Tustin's method, an alternate name for the bilinear transform, a digital-control approximation
