= Tustin Ranch, Tustin, California =

Tustin Ranch is a community located in the city of Tustin, California in Orange County, California. The property is historically part of the Irvine Ranch, and was a land preserve up until the creation of the community. The Irvine Company decided to build the planned community in 1982; it was approved for construction in 1986 by the County of Orange. It was annexed to the city of Tustin in 1986, and formed the 92782 ZIP Code. The Tustin Ranch was formerly a citrus ranch prior to the 1980s before its development. Today, no citrus ranches can be found on the Tustin Ranch plan, but almost all of the community streets are named after components of the former ranch.

The plan called for the creation of 7,000 residential units, from mansions to apartments to accommodate the variety of residents living in Orange County. The community falls within the Tustin Unified School District, and currently includes four schools within the ZIP code.

Nearly all the communities within Tustin Ranch surround the Tustin Ranch Golf Course, an 18-hole championship level course that was named Orange County's Finest Golf Course. The 165-acre (0.67 km^{2}) property winds through the foothills of the communities, and is dotted with several man made lakes.

== Education ==
Tustin Ranch is in the Tustin Unified School District. Primary schools in Tustin Ranch include:

- Peters Canyon Elementary School
- Ladera Elementary School
- Tustin Ranch Elementary School
- Pioneer Middle School

The Tustin Ranch area is primarily served by Beckman High School, which is also part of TUSD and located in the nearby city of Irvine.

== Commerce ==
=== Tustin Market Place ===
The Tustin Market Place is on Jamboree Road in the heart of the Ranch. The shopping complex is home to 120 shops, stores, and restaurants, and is the major regional shopping district for the ranch. The outdoor shopping district was created by The Irvine Company, which constructs many of the commercial spaces in the Irvine Ranch, in 1990. It is also home of the annual running event in Tustin called the Dinosaur Dash.

=== Tustin Auto Center ===
The Tustin Auto Center is right off Interstate 5 on Tustin Ranch Road, and is the largest auto center outside of the Cerritos Auto Square in Cerritos, California. It is home to 20 car dealerships. The auto center sells over 220 cars daily, and houses around 5,000 cars at any given time. It is one of the largest sources of revenue for the city of Tustin.

=== Famous People in Tustin Ranch ===
- Rex Hudler, former announcer of the Los Angeles Angels of Anaheim and former player on the Angels team.
- Edward (Eddie) Guardado (Gwar-DAH-doe), relief pitcher for the Texas Rangers resides in Tustin Ranch with his wife Lisa and three children. Was the most Valuable Player of his Babe Ruth team in 1985 and American Legion team in '89, and a 1989 graduate of Franklin High School in Stockton, CA, where he played baseball and football, receiving all-area and Most Valuable Player awards in baseball.
- Ryan Getzlaf, current captain of the Anaheim Ducks. Two-time Olympic gold medal winner as a member of Team Canada, part of 2007 Anaheim Ducks Stanley Cup Championship team and three time NHL all-star.

== Geography ==
Tustin Ranch is located in the eastern portions of the City of Tustin. It is a very narrow sliver of property wedged between Tustin Foothills to its north and Irvine to its south, with the Lomas Ridge preserve to its east.
