= Hillview High School (Orange County, California) =

Location
- 1701 San Juan Street; Tustin, California 92780; 33°44′06″N 117°48′36″W

Information
- Type: Public continuation high school
- Established: 1967
- School district: Tustin Unified School District
- Principal: Erick Fineberg
- Teaching staff: 11.64 (FTE)
- Grades: 9–12
- Enrollment: 177 (2023–2024)
- Student to teacher ratio: 15.21
- Mascot: Hawk
- Website: hillview.tustin.k12.ca.us

Hillview High School is a public continuation high school located in the unincorporated community of North Tustin in Orange County, California, United States. Its mailing address is in Santa Ana, California; however, it is a part of the Tustin Unified School District.

== History ==
In 1967 the Tustin Union High School District board of trustees approved a resolution to establish Hillview High School as a small high school. The schools purpose would be to provide continuation classes for students who were not enrolled in a mainstream high school, including those who dropped out for financial reasons, disability, or special guidance needs including habitual truancy, court issues, and behavioral problems. The original plan was to locate the school on the grounds of Tustin High School at an initial cost of $48,072, which the district expected to be refunded to them by the state. It was initially housed in a single portable building, but by 1968 had expanded to two portables.

In 1997 Hillview received full six-year accreditation from the Western Association of Schools and Colleges.

In 1998 the state Board of Education named the school as one of only 12 Model Continuation Schools in the state.
