= WCM =

WCM may stand for:

- Warner Chappell Music, an American music publishing company and a subsidiary of the Warner Music Group
- Wave characteristic method, a model used in fluid dynamics
- WCM, a radio station operated by the University of Texas at Austin under that call sign from 1922 to 1925; now licensed to Houston as KTRH
- WCMH-TV, an NBC-affiliated television station in Columbus, Ohio, United States
- Web content management
- West Coast Magazine, a Scottish literary publication
- Wisden Cricket Monthly, a UK-based cricket magazine
- Western classical music
- Woman Candidate Master, a World Federation chess title
- World Championship Motorsports, a Grand Prix motorcycle team
- WCM (Wide DC electric mixed), a classification of Indian locomotives

== See also ==
- WC (disambiguation)
- WCMS (disambiguation)
