= Artz Building =

Historic building in Tustin, California

- U.S. National Register of Historic Places
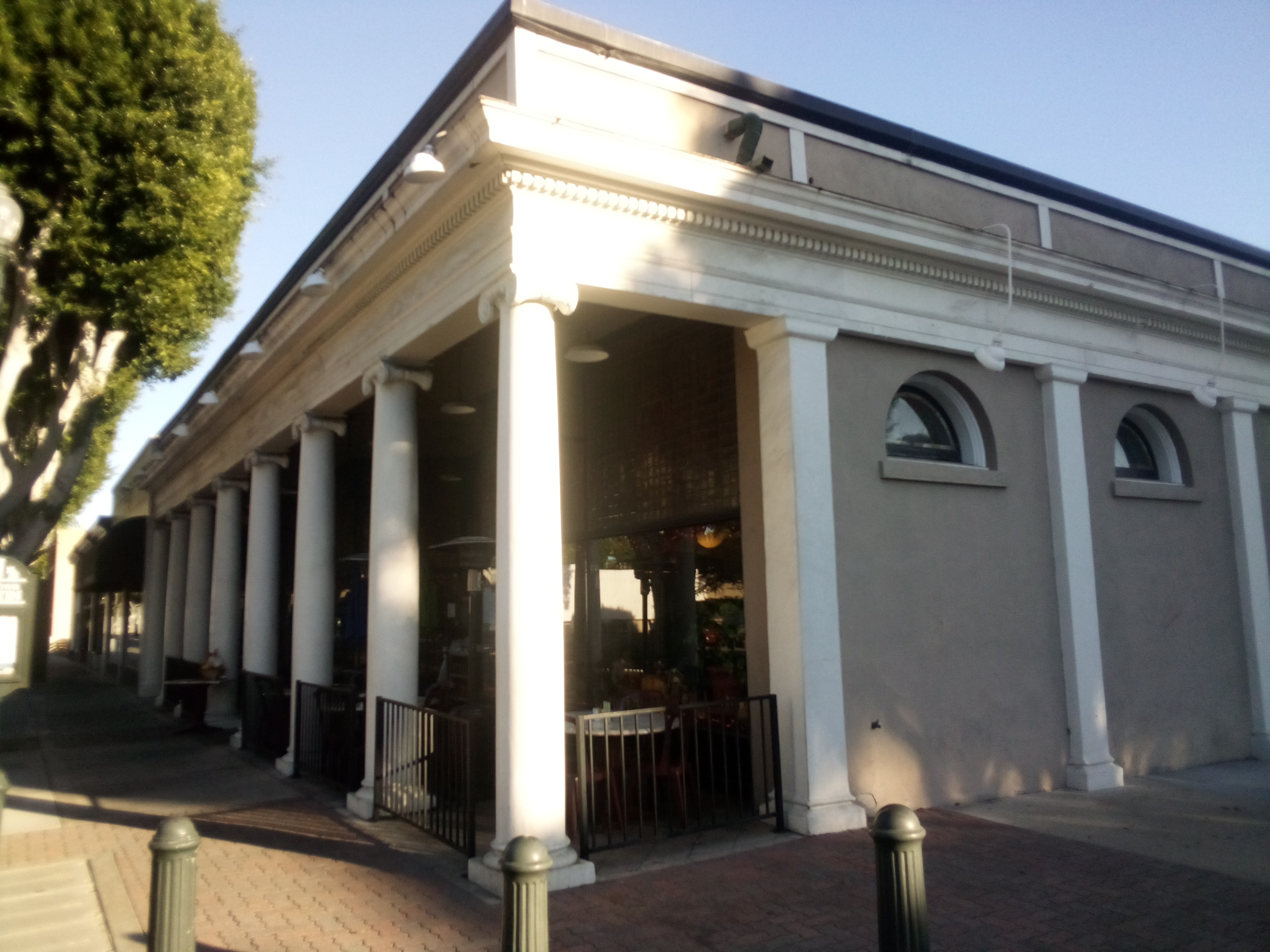
- The colonnade of the Artz Building
- Location: 150-158 W. Main St., Tustin, California, U.S.
- Coordinates: 33°44′29″N 117°49′43″W
- Built: 1914
- Built by: Samuel Tustin
- Architect: Unknown
- Architectural style: Classical Revival
- NRHP reference No.: 94000364
- Added to NRHP: April 18, 1994

The Artz Building is a historic former general store on Main Street in Tustin, California. Samuel Tustin built the building in 1914, and Charles O. Artz was the first tenant, operating a general store there until 1931. The Tustin Elementary School District temporarily used the building as a grammar school following the 1933 Long Beach earthquake. Several tenants occupied the space until the late 1970s when it became a restaurant.

The one-story Classical Revival-style building was listed on the National Register of Historic Places in 1994 due to its architectural significance. Its north-facing facade on Main Street is noted for its colonnade with Ionic capitals, as well as its frieze. The Artz Building's architect is unknown.

== History ==
Samuel Tustin, son of Tustin city founder Columbus Tustin, oversaw the construction of a one-story retail building on Main Street in 1914. The storefront was part of a small commercial zone central to the apricot, orange, and walnut groves in the area.

Tustin leased the building to Charles O. Artz, who opened it as a general store. For years, it served as "a type of social center for the town and surrounding ranches." According to the local oral history of the store, a suspected burglar died from cyanide poisoning as Artz had fumigated the building the day prior.

Artz's general store closed in 1931. Following the destructive 1933 Long Beach earthquake, the building was used temporarily by the Tustin Elementary School District (a predecessor to the Tustin Unified School District) as a replacement for a grammar school that was damaged.

Since its original purpose as a general store, several tenants have occupied the Artz Building. In 1978, a vegetarian restaurant called Rutabegorz opened in the building and remained a popular town staple for forty-seven years until their closing on October 30, 2025. The building currently remains vacant.

On April 18, 1994, the Artz Building was listed on the National Register of Historic Places for its architectural significance.

== Architecture ==
The Artz Building was designed in the Classical Revival style and built in 1914; its architect is unknown. The one-story retail building was constructed with brick and covered with stucco on its street-facing sides. It prominently features a colonnade on its north-facing Main Street facade with Ionic pillars. The west side of the building has six half-round windows, four of which are stained glass, and a series of pilasters installed for extra support a year after the 1933 earthquake. The alley-facing southern side consists of an original five brick archways and a door that was added in the 1970s. The east side of the building is a brick common wall shared with a neighboring storefront. The building has a frieze and parapet that wrap around all visible sides.

According to its NRHP listing from 1994, most of the building's interior has remained true to its original Artz general store appearance, including the woodworking, tin ceilings, and bowl lights. The building was constructed split into two separate rooms on the east and west side, a configuration that remains in place. In 1978, a kitchen was installed in the rear third of the west room, and restrooms were installed in the east room.
