= California and Nevada Credit Union Leagues =

US trade association for credit unions

- Type: Trade association
- Headquarters: Ontario, California, U.S.
- Members: Credit unions
- Chief Executive Officer: Scott Simpson
- Website: https://www.ccul.org

The California and Nevada Credit Union Leagues, formed in 1996, is the trade association for credit unions within California and Nevada. It serves more than 220 credit unions in those states, with over 12 million members and $281 billion in assets, (Effective Sept. 2023) making it the largest state-level credit union trade association in the United States.

The leagues are geographically divided into 20 networks, each with its own volunteer chairman and board of directors, which are elected by member credit unions in the respective states. Within the three-tier credit union system, the leagues maintain a mutual partnership with the Credit Union National Association (CUNA).

== History ==
=== California Credit Union League background ===
In 1933, less than 10 years after the founding of the first credit union in California, the California Credit Union League was organized by a group of approximately 25 credit unions at a meeting in Fresno. By 1940, League membership had grown to 246 credit unions. The San Francisco Credit Union Digest (eventually renamed as Credit Union Digest) was adopted as the official flagship publication of the League in 1941.

The League shared its first headquarters with East Bay Postal Credit Union on the second floor of the Oakland Post Office. Founded in 1927, East Bay Postal Credit Union merged with and into Pacific Postal Credit Union July 1, 2012, continuing consolidation within the industry. Throughout the years, the League's headquarters moved from the Bay Area to Pomona to Rancho Cucamonga to its current location in Ontario, California. The Leagues also currently operate offices in Sacramento, California and Washington, D.C.

The League has launched a number of credit union service organizations, including Western Bridge Corporate Federal Credit Union in 1977 (which was formerly known as the California Central Federal Credit Union and then as Western Corporate Federal Credit Union, and consolidated into Catalyst Corporate FCU in July 2012); Co-op Services (formerly known as CU-ATM Cooperatives, Inc. and then CO-OP Financial Services) in 1981; Origence® (formerly CU Direct Corporation) in 1994 in partnership with The Golden 1 Credit Union; and CU West Mortgage, Inc. in 2003, in partnership with SchoolsFirst Federal Credit Union (formerly Orange County Teachers FCU).

In 1992, the League founded the Shapiro Group to cooperatively pool the resources of the credit union community to help small credit unions operate efficiently and effectively. The first group of its kind, it was named in honor of San Francisco attorney Leo H. Shapiro, remembered as the “father of the credit union movement in California.”

=== Nevada Credit Union League background ===
The Nevada Credit Union League was formed in 1969. Darrel R. Daines was elected as the League's first president and the first board of directors was formed. Later that year, Glen A. Reese assumed the role as the League's managing director and the Maryland Parkway League offices opened.

The League's first annual meeting was held in 1970; the same year the first issue of its flagship publication, Nevada Nuggets, was published. In 1975, the League celebrated the passage of the state's credit union law. The first state-chartered credit union was Nevada Central CU.

Between the years of 1976 through 1990, the League became fully self-supporting, CU Plaza became its new headquarters, a credit union division was formed within the state's Department of Commerce, membership in Nevada credit unions increased, and the Nevada CU Political Action Committee was formed.

=== Merger ===
In September 1995, the California Credit Union League board of directors approved a management services agreement with the Nevada Credit Union League, which allowed the two leagues to remain separate entities. In October 1995, the 15 credit union members of the Nevada League voted unanimously to support the agreement, which went into effect January 1, 1996. At the time, then-California League President and CEO David L. Chatfield became president and CEO of both leagues, while Nevada League President and CEO Glen Reese stayed on as a consultant.
