= Tustin, California =

City in California, United States

- City
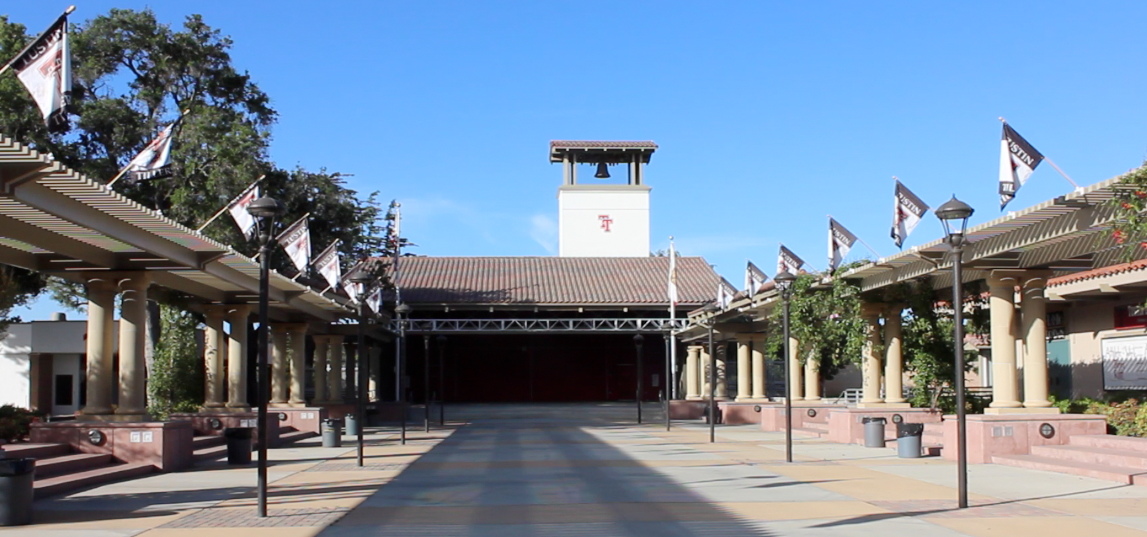
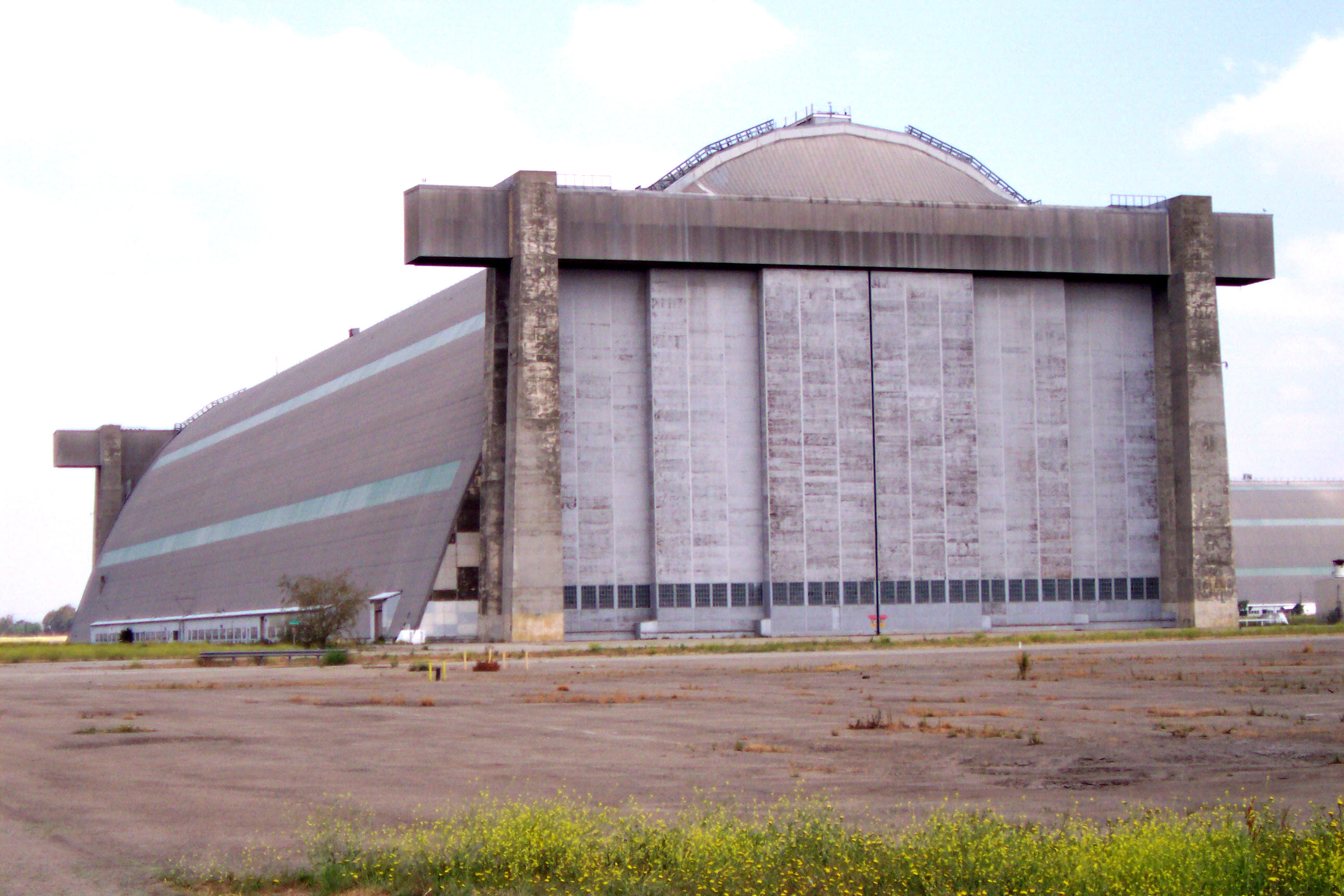
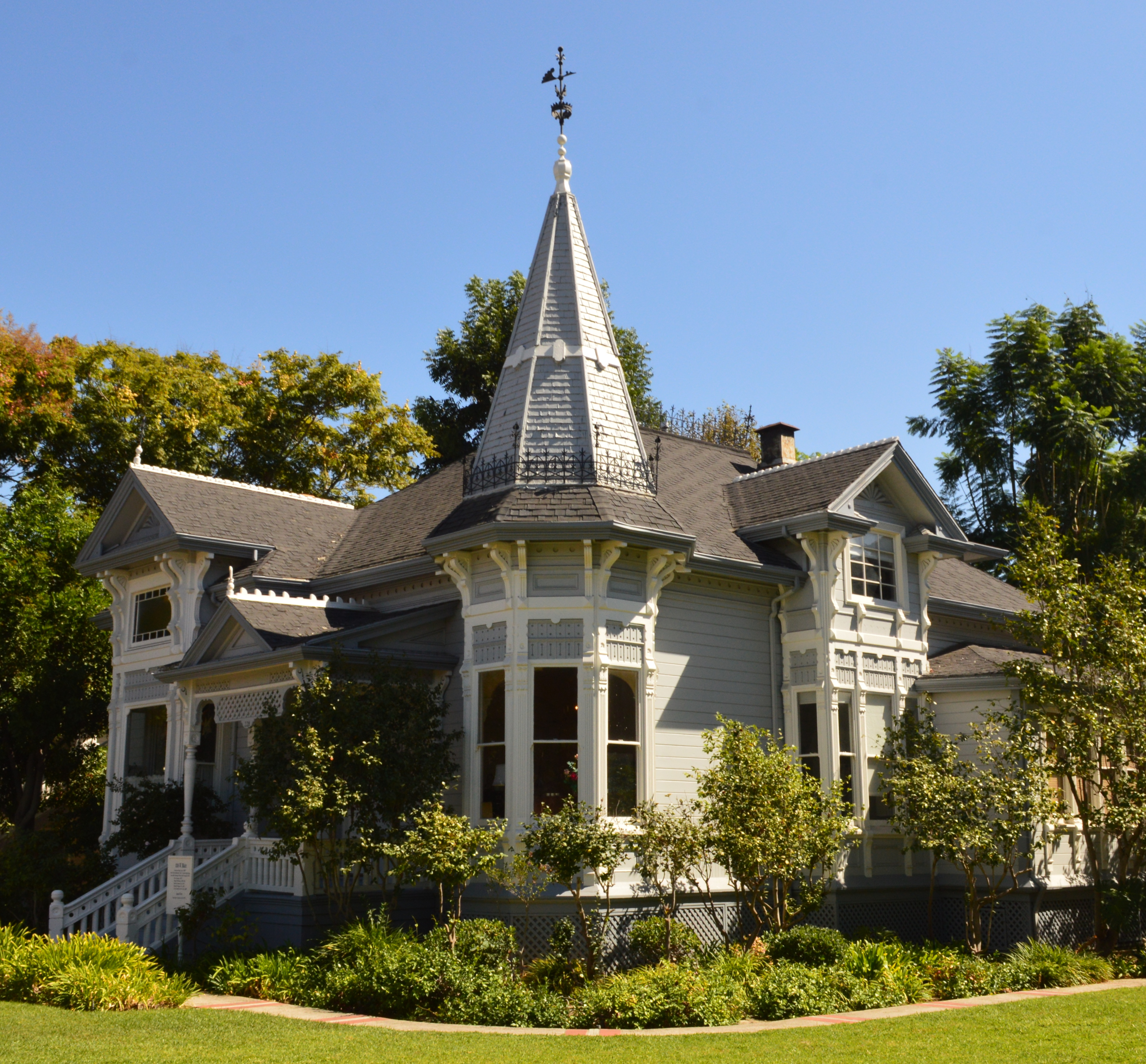
- Clockwise from top: Tustin High School Student Quad, Old MCAS Base Tustin Blimp Hangar, Sherman Stevens House

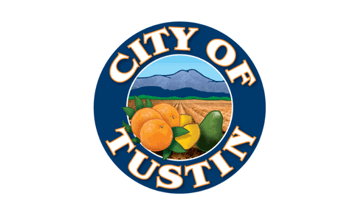
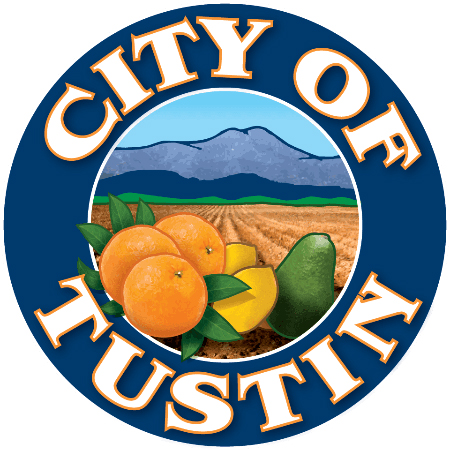
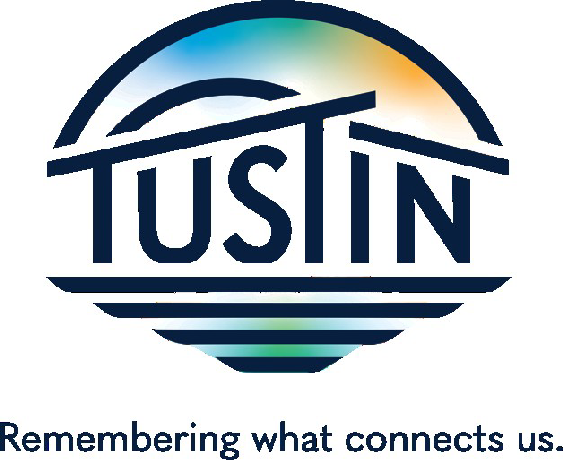
- Flag Seal Coat of arms Wordmark
- Nickname: City of Trees
- Interactive map of Tustin, California
- Location in the United States
- Coordinates: 33°44′23″N 117°48′49″W
- Country: United States
- State: California
- County: Orange
- Incorporated: September 21, 1927
- Named for: Columbus Tustin

Government
  - Type: Mayor-Council
  - Mayor: Austin Lumbard
  - Mayor Pro Tem: John Nielsen
  - City Council: Ryan Gallagher; Ray Schnell; Lee K. Fink
  - City Manager: Aldo Schindler

Area
  - Total: 11.16 sq mi (28.91 km^{2})
  - Land: 11.16 sq mi (28.91 km^{2})
  - Water: 0 sq mi (0.00 km^{2}) 0%
- Elevation: 138 ft (42 m)

Population (2020)
  - Total: 80,276
  - Density: 7,192/sq mi (2,777/km^{2})
- Time zone: UTC−8 (Pacific)
  - Summer (DST): UTC−7 (PDT)
- ZIP Codes: 92780–92782
- Area codes: 657/714, 949
- FIPS code: 06-80854
- GNIS feature IDs: 1661590, 2412117
- Website: www.tustinca.org

Tustin is a city in Orange County, California, United States, within the Los Angeles metropolitan area. In 2020, Tustin had a population of 80,276.

== History ==
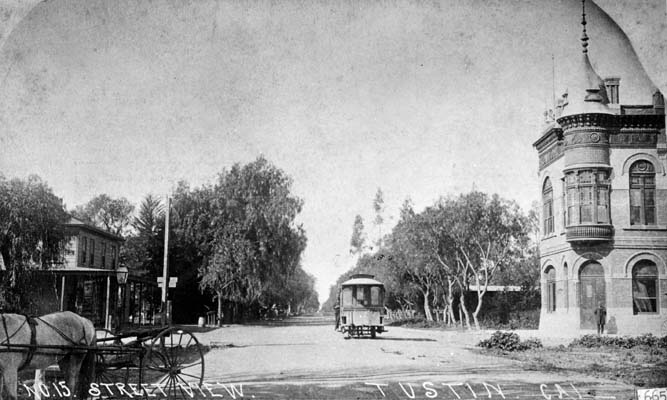
Tustin in 1890

Presently known as Red Hill, it was previously called the Katuktu hill by the indigenous while the Spanish also came up with the name "Cerrito de las ranas" which translates to little hill of frogs due to the quantity of frogs inhabiting the area.

On November 1, 1776, Mission San Juan Capistrano became the area's first permanent European settlement in Alta California, New Spain.

In 1801, the Spanish Empire granted 62,500 acres (253 km^{2}) to José Antonio Yorba, which he named Rancho San Antonio. Yorba's great rancho included the lands where the cities and communities of Olive, Orange, Villa Park, Santa Ana, Tustin, Costa Mesa and Newport Beach stand today. Smaller ranchos evolved from this large rancho including the Rancho Santiago de Santa Ana.

After the Mexican–American War, Alta California became part of the United States and American settlers arrived in this area. Columbus Tustin, a carriage maker from Northern California, founded the city in 1868 on 1,300 acres (5.3 km^{2}) of land from the former Rancho Santiago de Santa Ana. The city was incorporated in 1927 with a population of about 900. The townsite was bordered by Camino Real on the south, Newport Avenue on the east, 1st Street on the north, and Route 43, now known as the Costa Mesa Freeway, on the west.

=== 20th century ===
During World War II, a Navy anti-submarine airship base (later to become a Marine Corps helicopter station) was established on unincorporated land south of the city; the two dirigible hangars are among the largest wooden structures ever built and are listed on the National Register of Historic Places and ASCE List of Historic Civil Engineering Landmarks. The north hangar burned down in 2023.

Suburban growth after the war resulted in increased population, annexation of nearby unincorporated land, including the former Marine Corps Air Station, and development of orchards and farmland into housing tracts and shopping centers.

In 1996, two white supremacists, Gunner Lindberg and Domenic M. Christopher, stabbed a 24-year-old Vietnamese American to death on the Tustin High School tennis courts. In 2008, Lindberg became the first person in Orange County to be sentenced to death for a hate crime.

In June 2024, a United States Secret Service agent was robbed at gunpoint in a residential area of Tustin while President Joe Biden was in Southern California for a re-election fundraiser, drawing national media attention.

== Geography ==
According to the U.S. Census Bureau, the city has a total area of 11.2 square miles (28.9 km^{2}), all land. It is bordered by Irvine on the south and east, Orange and the unincorporated community North Tustin on the north, and Santa Ana on the west.

The city is sometimes referred to as "The City of Trees". Sycamores and oaks, native to the area, grew in abundance at the time of the founding of the city, and city founder Columbus Tustin was responsible for planting many more along the streets of the city.

=== Neighborhoods ===
- Aliso
- Columbus Grove
- Columbus Square
- Greenwood
- Old Town Tustin
- Tustin Legacy
- Tustin Meadows/Peppertree/Laurelwood (one of the city's oldest planned neighborhoods)
- Tustin Ranch

=== Climate ===
Tustin has a Mediterranean climate (Köppen climate classification: Csa).

Climate data for Tustin
Month	Jan	Feb	Mar	Apr	May	Jun	Jul	Aug	Sep	Oct	Nov	Dec	Year
Mean daily maximum °F (°C)	70 (21)	71 (22)	72 (22)	75 (24)	77 (25)	80 (27)	85 (29)	87 (31)	85 (29)	80 (27)	76 (24)	70 (21)	78 (26)
Mean daily minimum °F (°C)	47 (8)	48 (9)	50 (10)	53 (12)	58 (14)	61 (16)	65 (18)	67 (19)	63 (17)	57 (14)	50 (10)	46 (8)	56 (13)
Average precipitation inches (mm)	2.96 (75)	3.07 (78)	2.79 (71)	.77 (20)	.28 (7.1)	.10 (2.5)	.01 (0.25)	.14 (3.6)	.34 (8.6)	.40 (10)	1.22 (31)	1.79 (45)	13.87 (352)
Source: NOAA

== Demographics ==
Historical population
Census	Pop.	Note	%±
1880	227		—
1930	926		—
1940	953		2.9%
1950	1,143		19.9%
1960	2,006		75.5%
1970	22,190		1,006.2%
1980	32,248		45.3%
1990	50,689		57.2%
2000	67,504		33.2%
2010	75,540		11.9%
2020	80,276		6.3%
U.S. Decennial Census; 1860–1870 1880-1890; 1900 1910 1920; 1930 1940 1950; 1960 1970 1980; 1990 2000 2010; 2020

Tustin appeared in the 1880 United States census. After incorporation in 1927 it appeared as a city in the 1930 U.S. Census as part of Tustin Township (pop 1,691 in 1920).

=== Racial and ethnic composition ===
Tustin city, California – Racial and ethnic composition Note: the US Census treats Hispanic/Latino as an ethnic category. This table excludes Latinos from the racial categories and assigns them to a separate category. Hispanics/Latinos may be of any race.
Race / Ethnicity (NH = Non-Hispanic)	Pop 1980	Pop 1990	Pop 2000	Pop 2010	Pop 2020	% 1980	% 1990	% 2000	% 2010	% 2020
White alone (NH)	27,108	32,136	30,264	26,317	22,901	83.88%	63.40%	44.83%	34.84%	28.53%
Black or African American alone (NH)	844	2,759	1,785	1,535	1,619	2.62%	5.44%	2.64%	2.03%	2.02%
Native American or Alaska Native alone (NH)	143	205	199	142	95	0.44%	0.40%	0.29%	0.19%	0.12%
Asian alone (NH)	1,332	5,012	10,008	15,147	19,043	4.12%	9.89%	14.83%	20.05%	23.72%
Native Hawaiian or Pacific Islander alone (NH)	1,332	5,012	186	244	193	4.12%	9.89%	0.28%	0.32%	0.24%
Other race alone (NH)	68	69	145	185	418	0.21%	0.14%	0.21%	0.24%	0.52%
Mixed race or Multiracial (NH)	x	x	1,807	1,946	3,295	x	x	2.68%	2.58%	4.10%
Hispanic or Latino (any race)	2,822	10,508	23,100	30,024	32,712	8.73%	20.73%	34.24%	39.75%	40.75%
Total	32,317	50,689	67,504	75,540	80,276	100.00%	100.00%	100.00%	100.00%	100.00%

=== 2020 census ===
As of the 2020 census, Tustin had a population of 80,276 and a population density of 7,192.5 inhabitants per square mile (2,777.0/km^{2}). The median age was 36.3 years. 23.0% of residents were under age 18 and 11.8% were age 65 or older. For every 100 females, there were 94.5 males, and for every 100 females age 18 and over, there were 91.9 males.

The census reported that 99.4% of the population lived in households, 0.4% lived in non-institutionalized group quarters, and 0.1% were institutionalized. There were 27,266 households, of which 37.0% had children under the age of 18 living in them. Of all households, 50.1% were married-couple households, 7.1% were cohabiting-couple households, 26.3% had a female householder with no spouse or partner present, and 16.5% had a male householder with no spouse or partner present. About 20.0% of all households were made up of individuals, and 7.0% had someone living alone who was 65 years of age or older. The average household size was 2.93. There were 19,611 families (71.9% of all households).

100.0% of residents lived in urban areas and 0.0% lived in rural areas. There were 28,223 housing units at an average density of 2,528.7 units per square mile (976.3 units/km^{2}), of which 27,266 (96.6%) were occupied. Of occupied units, 47.6% were owner-occupied and 52.4% were occupied by renters. The homeowner vacancy rate was 0.7%, the rental vacancy rate was 3.7%, and 3.4% of housing units were vacant.

=== 2023 ACS estimates ===
In 2023, the US Census Bureau estimated that the median household income was $108,435, and the per capita income was $50,723. About 8.3% of families and 10.4% of the population were below the poverty line.

=== 2010 census ===
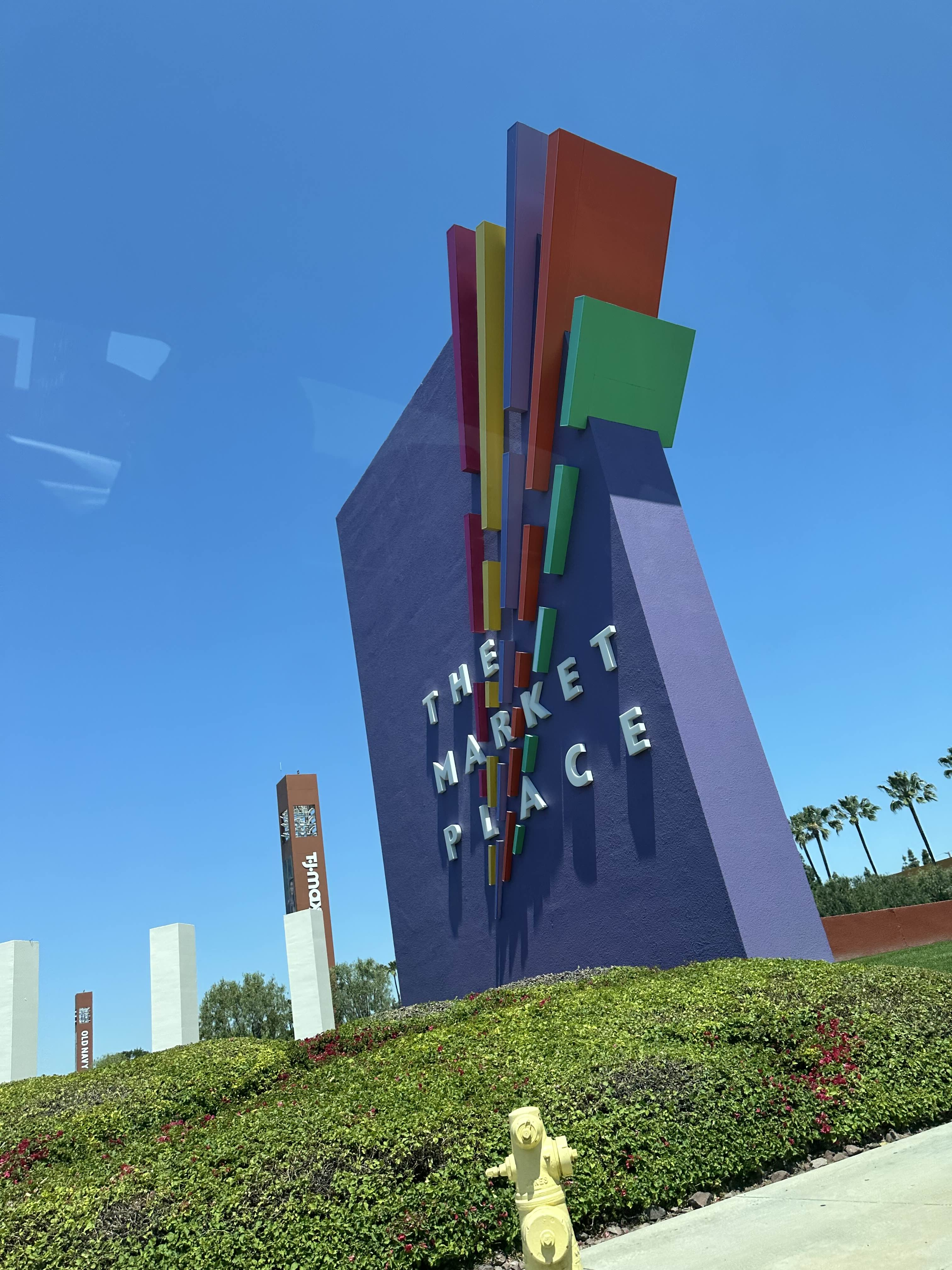
Tustin City, The Market Place sign

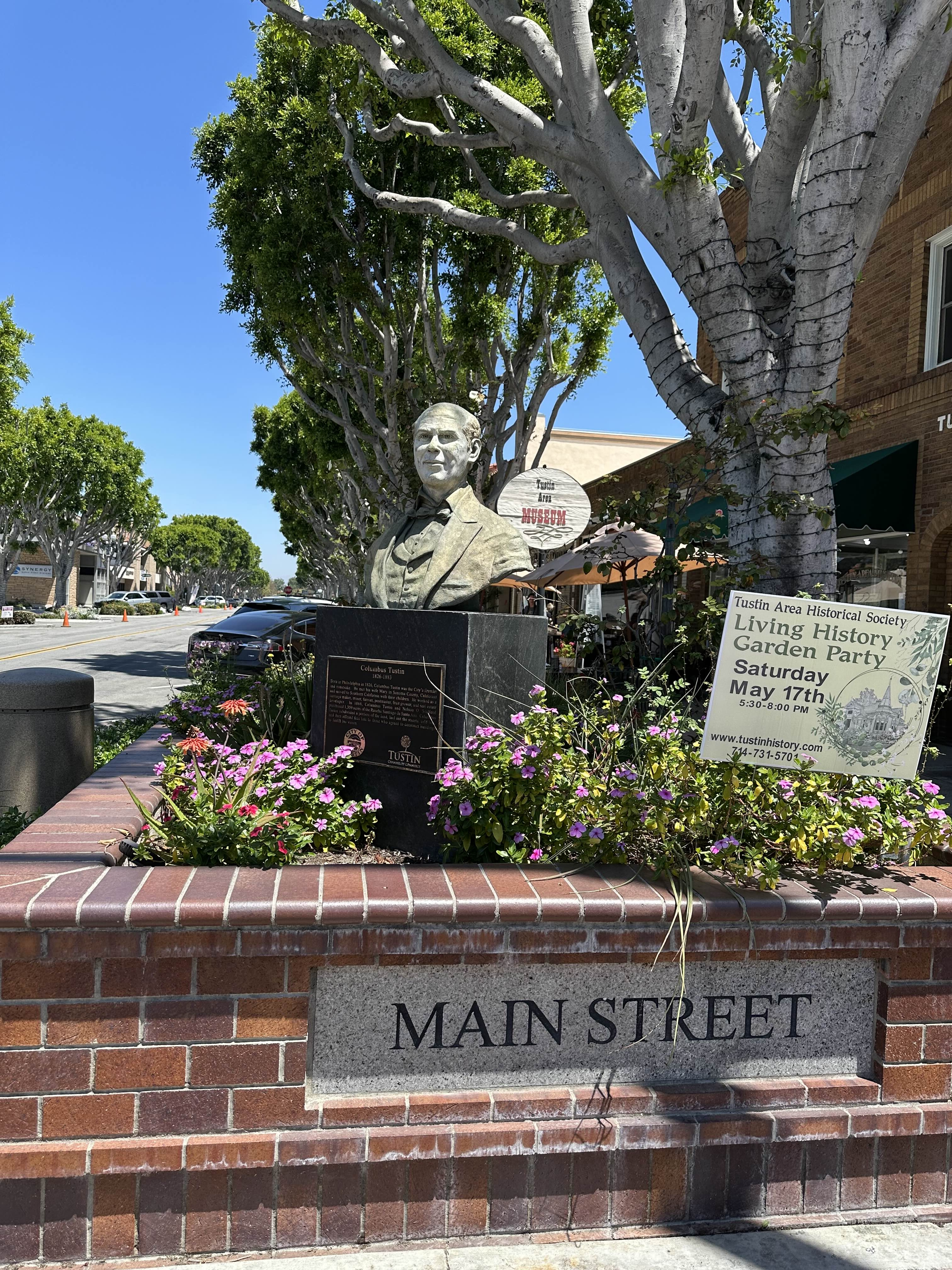
Main Street Tustin bust of Founder

As of the 2010 census, Tustin had a population of 75,540. The population density was 6,816.7 per square mile (2,631.9/km^{2}). The racial makeup was 39,729 (52.6%) White (34.8% Non-Hispanic White), 1,722 (2.3%) African American, 442 (0.6%) Native American, 15,299 (20.3%) Asian, 268 (0.4%) Pacific Islander, 14,499 (19.2%) from other races, and 3,581 (4.7%) from two or more races. There were 30,024 people of Hispanic or Latino origin, of any race (39.7%).

The census reported that 75,020 people (99.3% of the population) lived in households, 340 (0.5%) lived in non-institutionalized group quarters and 180 (0.2%) were institutionalized.

There were 25,203 households, of which 10,465 (41.5%) had children under the age of 18 living in them, 12,969 (51.5%) were opposite-sex married couples living together, 3,494 (13.9%) had a female householder with no husband present, 1,472 (5.8%) had a male householder with no wife present. There were 1,568 (6.2%) unmarried opposite-sex partnerships and 193 (0.8%) same-sex married couples or partnerships. 5,178 households (20.5%) were one person and 1,403 (5.6%) had someone living alone who was 65 or older. The average household size was 2.98. There were 17,935 families (71.2% of households) and the average family size was 3.46.

The age distribution was 20,212 people (26.8%) under the age of 18, 6,856 (9.1%) aged 18 to 24, 25,033 (33.1%) aged 25 to 44, 17,006 (22.5%) aged 45 to 64, and 6,433 (8.5%) who were 65 or older. The median age was 33.4 years. For every 100 females, there were 94.7 males. For every 100 females age 18 and over, there were 91.6 males.

There were 26,476 housing units at an average density of 2,389.2 per square mile (922.5/km^{2}). Of the occupied units, 12,813 (50.8%) were owner-occupied and 12,390 (49.2%) were rented. The homeowner vacancy rate was 1.3%; the rental vacancy rate was 5.8%. 36,783 people (48.7% of the population) lived in owner-occupied housing units and 38,237 people (50.6%) lived in rental housing units.

According to the 2010 census, Tustin had a median household income of $74,011, with 12.2% of the population living below the federal poverty line.

=== Crime ===
2023 Uniform Crime Reports data
	Aggravated Assault	Homicide	Rape	Robbery	Burglary	Larceny Theft	Motor Vehicle Theft	Arson
Tustin	105	1	7	63	186	1,352	208	8

== Economy ==
=== Top employers ===
According to the city's 2024 Comprehensive Annual Financial Report, the top employers in the city are:

#	Employer	# of Employees
1	Tustin Unified School District	2,491
2	SchoolsFirst Federal Credit Union	1,089
3	Costco	749
4	Rivian	500
5	Foothill Regional Medical Center	450
6	City of Tustin	440
7	Pacific Bell	416
8	New American Funding	412
9	Avid BioSciences	387
10	Virgin Galactic	339

== Arts and culture ==
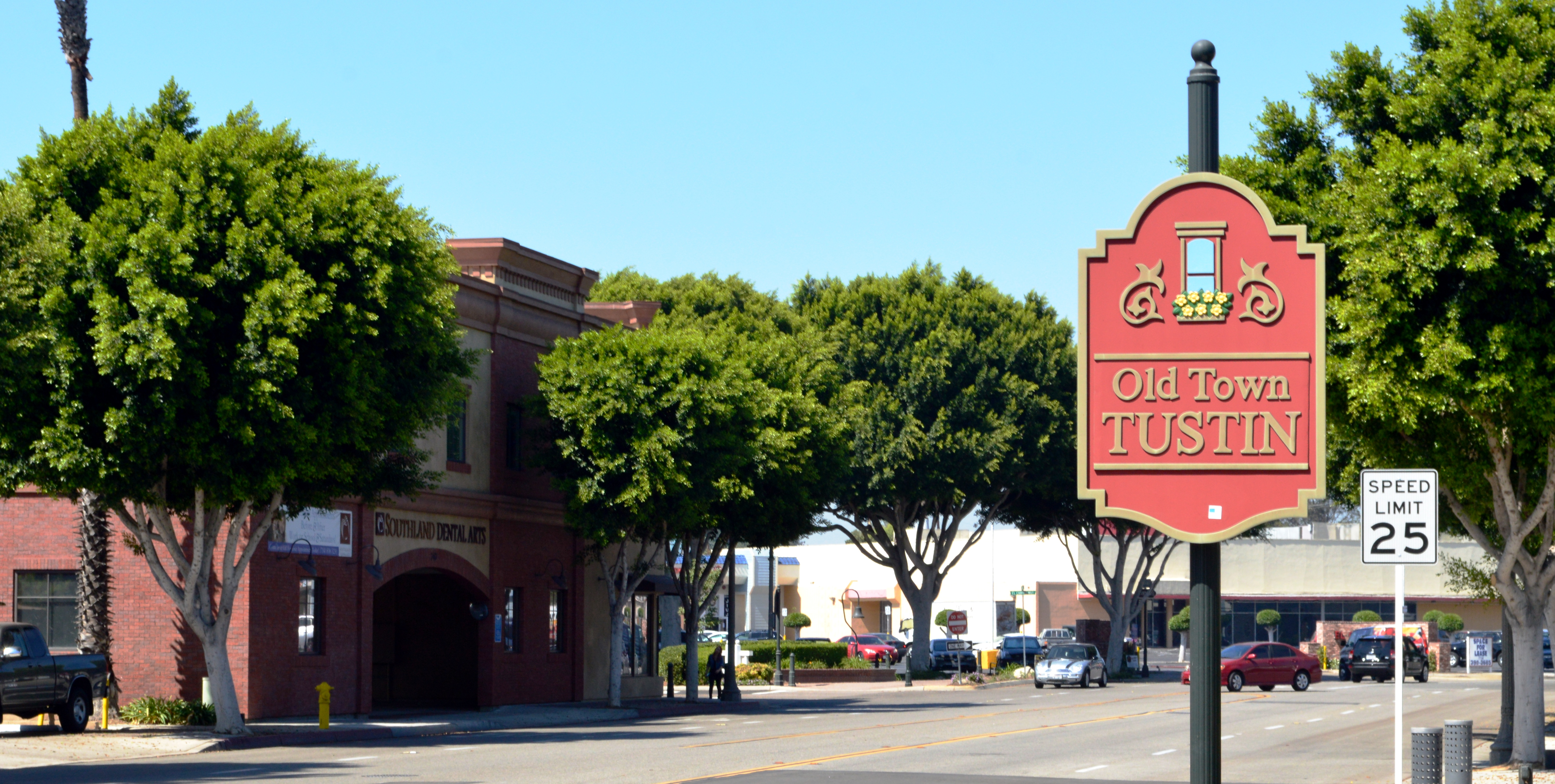
Old Town Tustin

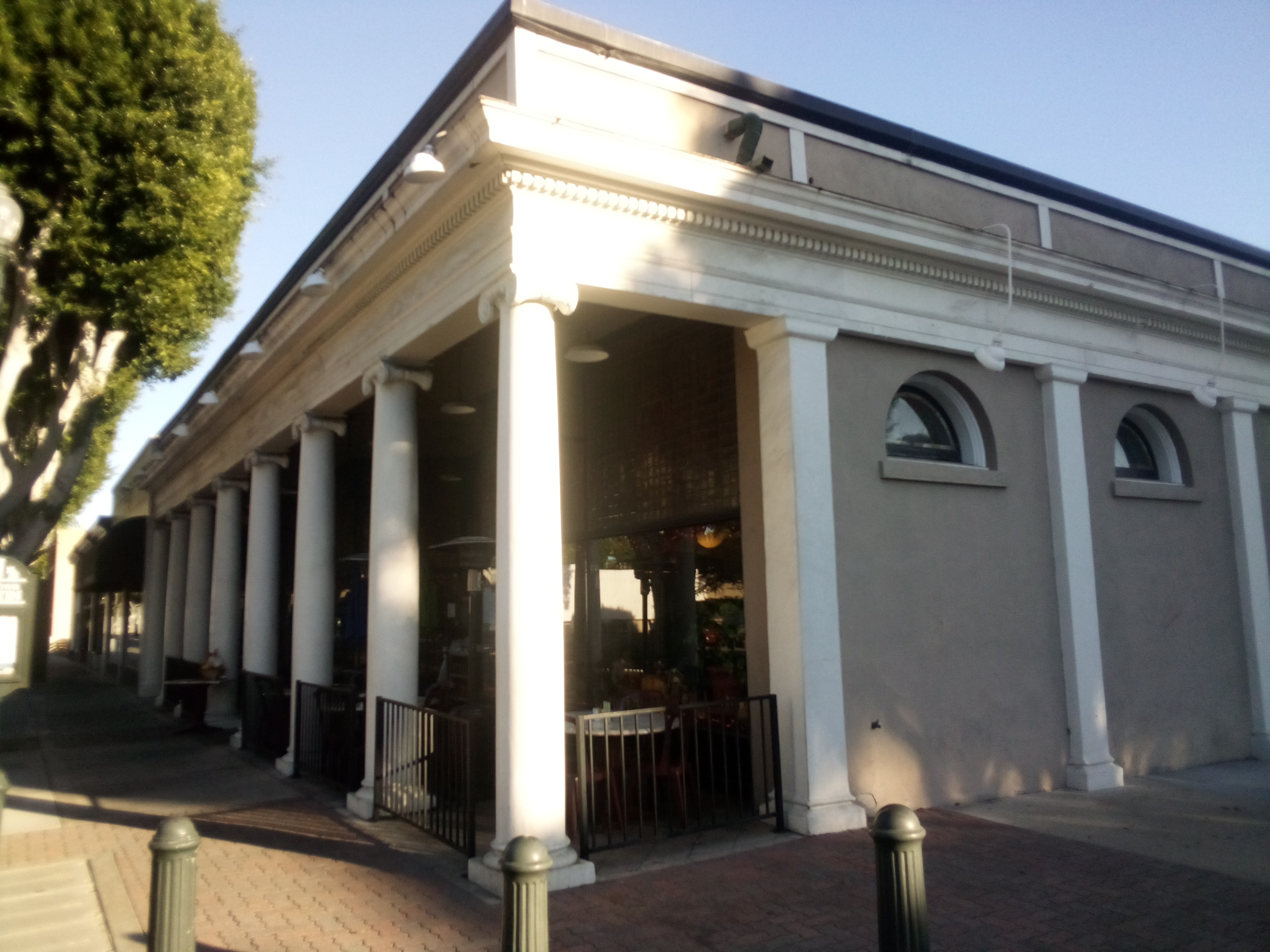
Artz Building

Points of interest include:

- The Market Place, formerly known as Tustin Market Place
- The District
- Tustin Area Museum
- Tustin Ranch
- Enderle Center
- Marine Corps Air Station Tustin
- Marconi Automotive Museum
- Tustin Legacy
- Old Town Tustin
- Tustin Ranch Golf Course

Sites listed on the National Register of Historic Places include:

- Artz Building
- David Hewes House
- Sherman Stevens House

== Government ==
=== Local ===
The Tustin City Council is composed of five members elected at large; the mayorship rotates among the council members and is primarily a ceremonial role.

Mayor Austin Lumbard was elected to the Tustin City Council in 2022. As of 2025, John Nielsen, Ryan Gallagher, Ray Schnell, and Lee K. Fink are also on the City Council.

Local politics in the late 1990s and early 2000s were dominated by the 1997 closure of the local Marine Corps Air Station and plans for the subsequent commercial development of the land, including an unsuccessful bid by neighboring Santa Ana to build a school on the land, part of which is within Santa Ana Unified School District's territory.

=== State, federal, county ===
In the California State Legislature, Tustin is in the 37th senatorial district, represented by Republican Steven Choi and in the 73rd Assembly district, represented by Democrat Cottie Petrie-Norris.

In the United States House of Representatives, Tustin is in California's 40th congressional district, represented by Republican Young Kim.

In the Orange County Board of Supervisors, Tustin is split between two districts:

- 2nd supervisorial district, represented by Vicente Sarmiento since 2023.
- 3rd supervisorial district, represented by Donald P. Wagner since 2019.

== Education ==
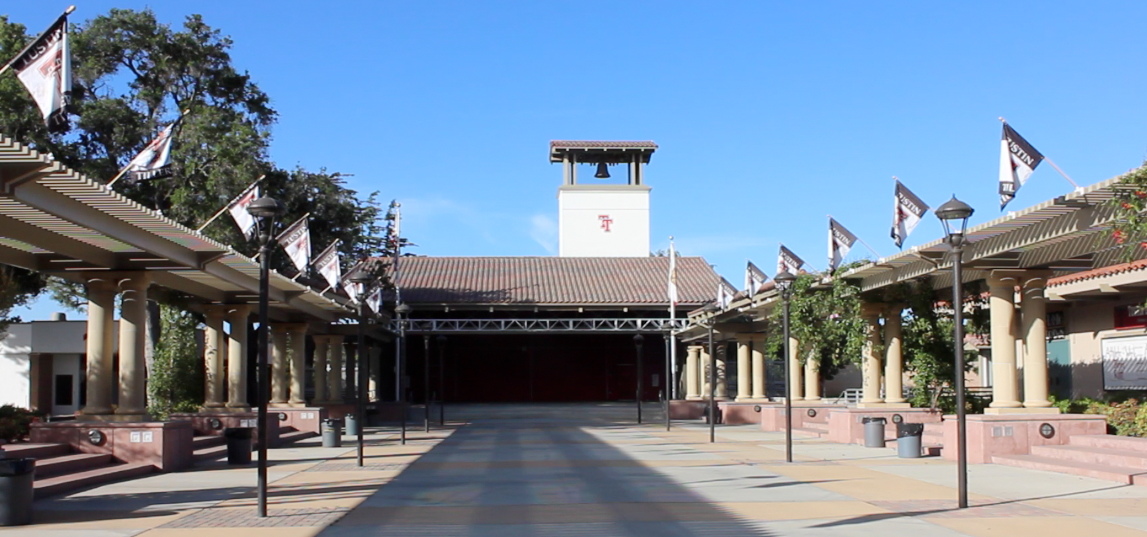
The Quad at Tustin High School

Primary and secondary education in Tustin and surrounding unincorporated areas is overseen by the Tustin Unified School District. Schools include:

- Tustin High School
- Foothill High School
- Arnold O. Beckman High School

Springfield College, a non-profit, private, higher education institute, is located in Tustin.

== Infrastructure ==
=== Transportation ===
Orange County Transportation Authority operates bus service in Tustin.

=== Police and fire services ===
The Tustin Police Department was founded in 1927, and has jurisdiction over the city of Tustin, and the Tustin Legacy development.

Fire protection is provided by the Orange County Fire Authority.

=== Water Services ===
Water in Tustin is supplied by the City of Tustin Water Services, which sources its water from the Metropolitan Water District of Southern California via the Municipal Water District of Orange County. This water is imported from Northern California and the Colorado River. In addition, groundwater is managed by the Orange County Water District, sourced from underground aquifers.

== Notable people ==
=== Actors ===
- Cuba Gooding Jr., actor
- Rachel Kimsey, actress
- Matthew Lillard, actor
- Caroline Sunshine, actress

=== Athletes ===
- Sam Baker, former NFL player
- James Beaumont "Beau" Bell, NFL player
- Heath Bell, MLB player
- Milorad Čavić, swimmer
- Chris Chester, NFL player
- Gerrit Cole, MLB player
- DeShaun Foster, NFL player
- Evelyn Furtsch, swimmer
- Alfonso Gómez, boxer
- Doug Gottlieb, TV sports analyst and host, former college basketball player
- Mark Grace, former MLB player, coach
- Shawn Green, former MLB player
- Rex Hudler, former MLB player
- Phil Hughes, MLB player
- Matt Konan, professional ice hockey player
- Jillian Kraus (born 1986), water polo player
- Caitlin Lowe, former softball player
- Matt McCoy, former NFL player
- Frostee Rucker, NFL player
- Dave Staton, former MLB player
- Richard Umphrey III, former NFL player
- Zack Weiss, American-Israeli MLB pitcher
- Coryn Rivera, professional cyclist
- Bobby Okereke, NFL player
- Trevor Connelly, NHL player

=== Other ===
- Mary Kay Letourneau, former schoolteacher convicted for statutory second degree rape
- Claude Nowell, businessperson
- Julie Sweet, businessperson
