= Foothill High School (Orange County, California) =

Public school in Santa Ana, California, United States

Location
- 19251 Dodge Avenue; Santa Ana, California 92705; United States; 33.767411°N 117.798071°W

Information
- Type: Public
- Established: 1963
- School district: Tustin Unified School District
- Principal: Dr. Michelle Villa
- Staff: 84.97 (FTE)
- Faculty: 114
- Grades: 9th-12th
- Enrollment: 2,126 (2024-2025)
- Student to teacher ratio: 25.02
- Campus: Suburban
- Colors: Gold; Black; White
- Mascot: Knight
- Rival: Tustin High School
- Website: foothill.tustin.k12.ca.us

Foothill High School is a public secondary school located in the unincorporated community of North Tustin, California between Old Foothill Boulevard and Dodge Avenue. It has a mailing address of Santa Ana, but it is a part of the Tustin Unified School District.

== History ==
A Foothill logo from the 1960s

Opened in September 1963, it is the second oldest high school in the Tustin Unified School District. Its name is derived from the Tustin Foothills, which is the pre-2005 name of the area of North Tustin.

In 1996, Foothill was awarded the National Blue Ribbon School award. It was awarded the California Gold Ribbon School award in 2015 and the California Distinguished School award three times, in 1994, 1999, and 2005.

== Academics ==
Foothill High School offers multiple academic programs including 23 advanced placement classes, 10 Honors classes, and 8 International Baccalaureate classes. Foothill is the only school in the Tustin Unified School District to offer the International Baccalaureate program. Foothill also offers AVID and CTE pathways in the areas of Engenering, Media Arts( such as FTV), Manufacturing, Culinary Arts, Computer Science, Visual Imagery, Graphic Design, Robotics, and Applied Medical.

Foothill also partners with Irvine Valley College (IVC) to offer dual enrollment courses in Business, American Sign Language, Kinesiology, and Dance history.

== Athletics ==
Foothill plays in the Crestview League, a part of the CIF Southern Section (CIF-SS), which is part of California Interscholastic Federation (CIF).

=== Seasons ===
Foothill has 22 teams in 14 sports.

Fall:

- Cross country
- Football (men's)
- Golf (women's)
- Tennis (women's)
- Volleyball (women's)
- Water polo (men's)

Winter:

- Basketball (men's/women's)
- Soccer (men's/women's)
- Water polo (women's)
- Wrestling (men's/women's)

Spring:

- Baseball (men's)
- Golf (men's)
- Lacrosse (men's/women's)
- Softball (women's)
- Swimming
- Tennis (men's)
- Track
- Volleyball (men's)

== Campus ==
Foothill was built on a 37-acre campus.

== Notable alumni ==
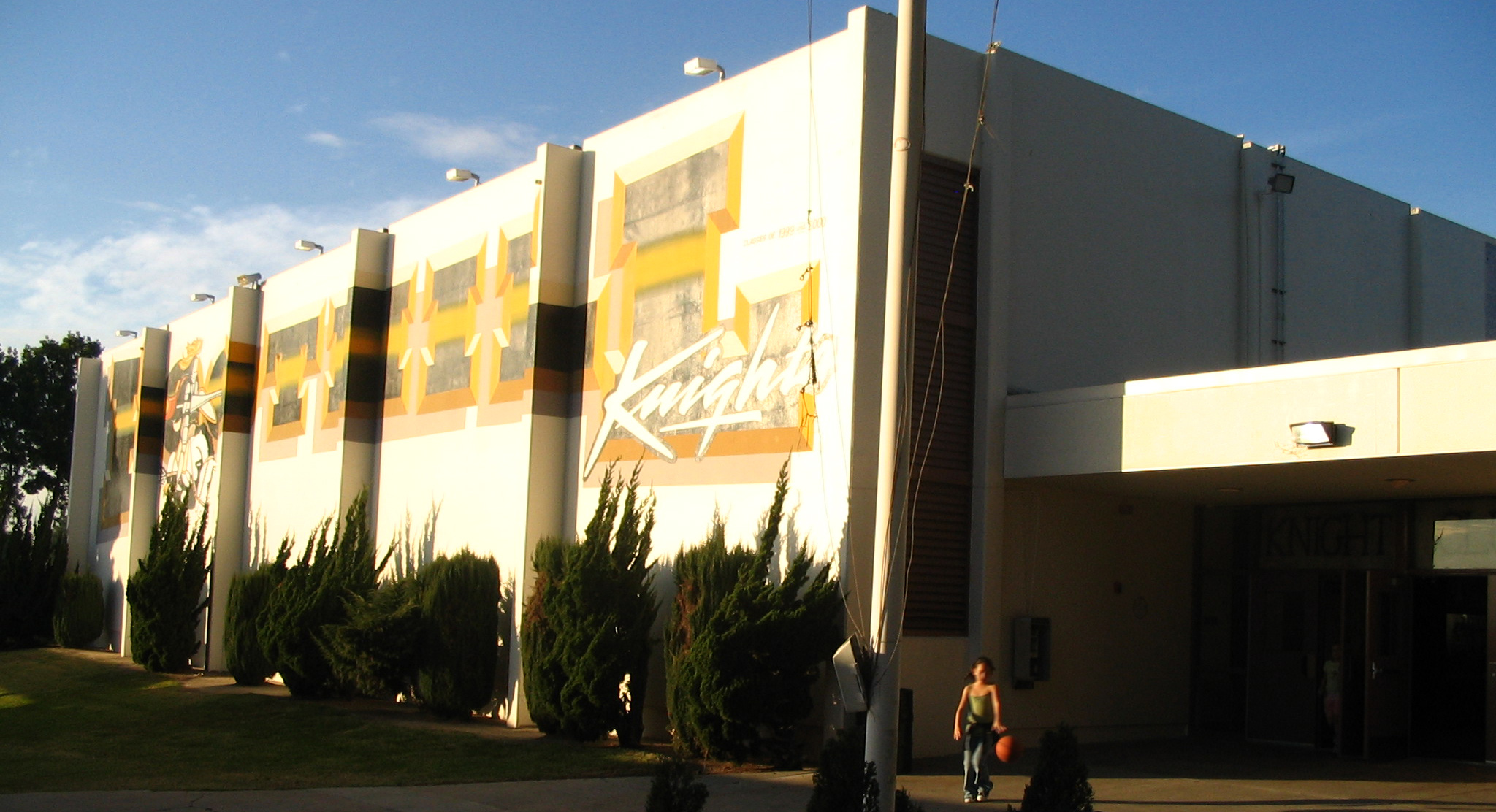
The FHS gym

- Brian Alexander, former United States men's national water polo team member and 2011 Pan American Games gold medalist
- Eva Angelina (2003), adult film actress
- Eliana Moreno (2006), NBC 4 news reporter tragically killed in a helicopter accident
- Brad Boxberger, baseball player
- Mike Champion (1976–1978), baseball player with the San Diego Padres
- Jamal Duff (1990), football player, actor
- Kimberly Duran (born 1989), muralist
- Doug Eisenman (born 1968), tennis player
- Bruce Furniss, 1976 Olympic gold medalist, swimming
- Steve Furniss, 1972 Olympic bronze medalist, swimming
- Jason Hairston (1990), businessman, professional football player
- Margo Harshman (2004), TV & film actress Even Stevens
- Brittany Hayes, 2008 Olympic silver medalist, water polo
- Chris Hoke (1994), professional football player
- Phil Hughes (2004), baseball player
- Sadie Jean (2020), singer
- Norm Katnik (1999), NFL center for Minnesota Vikings
- Adam Koets (2002), professional football player
- Jillian Kraus (born 1986), water polo player
- Phil Krueger (1986, 1988) Indianapolis 500 race car driver
- J. W. Krumpholz (2006), Olympic silver medalist, water polo
- Richard Lambourne (1993), 2008 USA Olympic gold medalist, men's volleyball team
- Matthew Lillard (1988), actor, Scooby Doo, Scream
- Caitlin Lowe (2003), member of the USA National Softball Team
- Kristen Mann (2001), Indiana Fever WNBA
- Bobby Okereke (2014), NFL linebacker for New York Giants
- Jeff Pickler, baseball player and coach
- Joanna Rosholm, former press secretary
- Roger Craig Smith, voice actor
- Bill Snyder, coached at Foothill High School from 1969-1974, then went on to a coach at Kansas State University.
- Rod Strachan, Olympic gold medalist
- Alison Sweeney, actress, Days of Our Lives
- Stuart Tay, student who was murdered in 1992
- Victory Tischler-Blue (1977), singer, film producer, and member of the band The Runaways
