= Western CUNA Management School =

- Type: Private
- Established: June 1959
- President: Diana R. Dykstra
- Dean: Michael D. Steinberger
- Location: Claremont, California, USA
- Mascot: Frog
- Website: wcmspomona.edu

The Western CUNA Management School (WCMS) is a credit union management school in the United States. It is sponsored by thirteen western state credit union leagues of the Credit Union National Association (CUNA) and in cooperation with Pomona College in Claremont, California. The school was established in June 1959 to serve credit union professionals located within the District Four of CUNA. The founding committee that oversaw the schools operation were Carl A. Bowman, Charles R. Stark, Robert W. Wells, Dwight J. Brohard, then-Director of Education of the California Credit Union League Charles M. Clark as school director, John Clevenger, and John Bigger. Clarence Murphy served as an ex officio member.

== History ==
In 1958, the board of directors of the California Credit Union League (CCUL) instructed Clarence Murphy, the league's managing director, to explore the possibility of forming a school patterned after the Credit Union National Association school at the University of Wisconsin. The school was to serve credit unions within the District Four of CUNA. Carl A. Bowman and Charles R. Stark led in organizing the CUNA District 4 School for Credit Union Personnel. A committee was also formed to oversee the operation of the school. The committee then selected to partner with the University of California at Los Angeles (UCLA) and the school opened on August 12, 1960, with the first batch of 42 students who were to become the class of 1962.

In the latter part of the 1960s, the school started its search for a new partner institution. On August 14, 1972, the school held its first classes at its new and current home at Pomona College in Claremont, California. According to James Likens, the strained relationship between the school and UCLA, mainly due to lack of continuity of faculty coordinators from UCLA and unwillingness to provide the educational program needed for the school to succeed, forced the school to look for another location. This is in contrast to how Charles Clark attributed to UCLA for having excellent coordinators that contributed to Western CUNA Management School's fine reputation.

The school changed its name in 1980 to the Western Regional CUNA School to reflect the fact that the school is no longer in the district four of CUNA, but now district nine. In 1981, the school changed its name again to Western CUNA Management School to better reflect the 13 Western states that it serves and how the program has become a "management" program rather than a school for credit union personnel.

=== Greek alphabet class names ===
The first-year class of 1981 was one of the largest in the school's history. The school's curriculum at the time made it necessary to divide the class into two sections and they were named "Alpha" and "Beta". This started the tradition of naming each class after a letter of the Greek alphabet. Once all the letters of the Greek alphabet is used the next class is again called "Alpha". The second batch of "Alpha" class graduated in 2003.
