= Kuiu =

American hunting gear and apparel brand

KUIU
- Type: Private company
- Industry: Hunting
- Founded: 2011; 15 years ago
- Founder: Jason Hairston
- Headquarters: Dixon, California, USA
- Products: Hunting gear
- Website: kuiu.com

KUIU (pronounced 'koo-you') is an American hunting gear and apparel brand that sells direct to consumers. It was founded by Jason Hairston in 2011.

In 2017, San Francisco-based Main Post Partners invested $50 million in the company. In October 2023, two years before opening a store in Dallas, it opened a retail store in San Antonio, Texas, which the firm said was the start of a market expansion.

In December 2025, Main Post Partners sold KUIU to a fellow private investor group including Cox Enterprises.

== History ==
KUIU was founded in 2011 by Jason Hairston, who previously co-founded Sitka Gear. With a background as a hunter and former NFL player, Hairston set KUIU as a source for high-performance, ultralight hunting apparel and gear, particularly for mountain and expedition-style pursuits.

The company applied a direct-to-consumer model from the outset and generated about $500,000 in sales on its first day, reaching break-even by its second year. KUIU remained profitable and had projected sales of around $50 million by 2016.

After Hairston's death in 2018, KUIU continued operations per his vision. In 2020, for example, the company expanded its philanthropic and conservation initiatives, launching the Conservation Direct program to fund and execute on-the-ground wildlife projects.

In 2023, the company entered brick-and-mortar retail with its first store opening in San Antonio, Texas, followed by a flagship store in Dallas in 2024. In December 2025, ownership changed when Main Post Partners sold KUIU to a private investor group that included Cox Enterprises and several conservation-minded families.
