= Enderle Center =

Shopping Center in Tustin, California

Enderly Center
- Location: Tustin, California, United States
- Coordinates: 33.7589°N 117.8281°W
- Address: 17350 17th St, Tustin, CA 92780
- Opened: 1977
- Architect: Jim E. Shimozono

Enderly Center is an outdoor shopping center located in Tustin, California. Located on Seventeenth Street and Enderle Center Drive, the center is known for its variety of shops as well as community events such as classic car shows and its annual holiday open house.

== History ==
Enderle Center was developed in 1976 by the Enderle family and designed by architect Jim E. Shimozono. The Enderle family owned and managed the property until its sale in 2026.

== Redevelopment ==
Burnham-Ward Properties announced plans to acquire the property in 2026 and redevelop the center into a mixed-use space known as Campo on 17th. The development will add 100 townhouse style homes in addition to 60,000 square ft of retail space. The redevelopment has forced longtime tenants including the Crab Cooker and El Torito to close. Zov's Restaurant and Bistro is the only current tenant expected to remain.
