= Jason Hairston =

American football player (1971–2018)

Jason Hairston (July 17, 1971 – September 4, 2018) was an American businessman and American football player who played in the National Football League (NFL). He was the founder and CEO of Kuiu, a hunting gear company.

Hairston grew up in Southern California. In high school, he was an All-Orange County defender at Foothill High School. He attended the University of California, Davis and, in 1993, was named a starting linebacker for UC Davis Aggies football. In his junior season, he broke his neck during a Division II playoff game, damaging his C5 and C6 vertebrae. In 1995, he was signed as an unrestricted free agent to the San Francisco 49ers. After a year with the team, he signed with the Denver Broncos before retiring in 1996.

Hairston was then a commercial real estate agent and co-founded the hunting gear company Sitka in 2005 with Jonathan Hart. They sold the company to Gore-Tex in 2009. In 2010, he founded Kuiu, which had expected sales of $50 million in 2016.

Hairston was friends with Donald Trump Jr. and in March 2017 accepted a position as liaison to the United States Department of the Interior and hunting groups on conservation and public lands issues. He and his wife Kirstyn had two children. He was found dead at his home in Dixon, California, on September 4, 2018, later announced to be from suicide.

Postmortem investigations of his brain by the neuropathologist Bennett Omalu revealed that he had Chronic traumatic encephalopathy. He was one of at least 345 NFL players to be diagnosed after death with this disease, which is caused by repeated hits to the head.
