= WCMS =

WCMS may refer to:

- Web content management system
- Western CUNA Management School, U.S.
- WCMS-FM, an FM radio station located in Hatteras, North Carolina, U.S.
- West Collierville Middle School, in Collierville, Tennessee, U.S.
- Webb City Middle School, a middle school in the Webb City R-7 School District, in Webb City, Missouri, U.S.
