= Adam Koets =

American football player (born 1984)

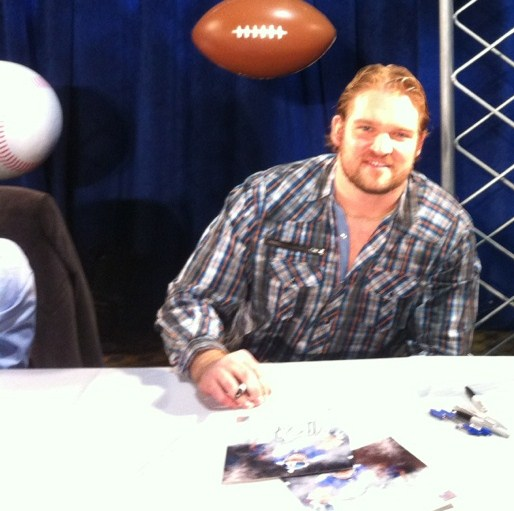
- Koets at a telethon in 2011

No. 61
- Position: Offensive tackle

Personal information
- Born: January 7, 1984 (age 42); Santa Ana, California, U.S.
- Listed height: 6 ft 5 in (1.96 m)
- Listed weight: 300 lb (136 kg)

Career information
- High school: Foothill (North Tustin, California)
- College: Oregon State
- NFL draft: 2007: 6th round, 189th overall pick

Career history
- New York Giants (2007–2011)

Awards and highlights
- Super Bowl champion (XLII); Second-team All-Pac-10 (2006)

Career NFL statistics
- Games played: 11
- Games started: 4
- Stats at Pro Football Reference

Adam Koets (/ˈkoʊts/; born January 7, 1984) is an American former professional football player who was an offensive tackle for the New York Giants of the National Football League (NFL). He was selected by the Giants in the sixth round of the 2007 NFL draft. He played college football for the Oregon State Beavers.

== Early life ==
Koets was born in Santa Ana, California to parents Russell and Helen Koets. He has one older brother, Jeff and an older sister, Amber. Koets attended Foothill High School in North Tustin, California. Koets lettered three years in football. He started three years as a defensive end and his senior season as a left tackle on offense. He was chosen as a first-team All-Century League on offense his final season and a three-time all-league selection on defense. Koets was the Century League Defensive Lineman of the Year twice and second-team All-Orange County and first-team All-CIF Division VI on offense as a senior. In his high school career, he had 229 tackles and 16 quarterback sacks. He graduated from Foothill High in 2002.

== College career ==
Koets attended Oregon State University where he played offensive tackle. After redshirting in 2002, Koets played in five games in 2003 as a redshirt freshman. In 2004, he started all 12 games. As a junior in 2005, Koets started all 11 games at left tackle. His play assisted Beaver running back Yvenson Bernard to rank ninth in the nation with a 120.1 yards per game average and quarterback Matt Moore to finish second in the Pac-10 for yards per game passing at 271.1 yards per game. In his senior year in 2006, Koets was a second-team All Pac-10 Conference selection after helping the team to average 360.6 yards per game. He started all 13 games his senior season. In his time with Oregon State, he was a three-time Academic All-Pac-10 Conference selection. He graduated with a major in International Business and a minor in German.

== Professional career ==
Koets was selected by the Giants in the sixth round of the 2007 NFL draft with the 189th overall pick. During his four-year career, he played eleven games, starting four. In the 2007 postseason, he started the 2007–08 NFL playoffs.

He was released from the Physically Unable to Perform list on November 8, 2011.

== Personal life ==
Koets is a thrill seeker, enjoying sky diving, bungee jumping, surfing and other related extreme sports. Koets is also an accomplished singer and has appeared with the Grove Valve Orchestra, a band led by food industry magnate, Gary Erickson.
