= Jillian Kraus =

American water polo player (born 1986)

Personal information
- Full name: Jillian Amaris Kraus
- Nationality: American
- Born: December 18, 1986 (age 39) Newport Beach, California
- Home town: Tustin, California
- Education: UCLA; UC Irvine Paul Merage School of Business
- Height: 5 ft 9 in (175 cm)

Sport
- Country: United States
- Sport: water polo
- Position: Defender
- University team: UCLA

Jillian Amaris Kraus (born December 18, 1986) is a water polo player. She won a gold medal in the 2005 Junior World Championships, won four straight NCAA Women's Water Polo Championships with UCLA, and has played with the United States women's national water polo team.

== Early life ==
Kraus was born in Newport Beach, California, to Robert and Pamela Kraus, and is Jewish. She has two brothers, Chris and Jeremy, and one sister, Jennifer. She later lived in Tustin, California.

She competed in water polo and swimming for Foothill High School in Santa Ana, California. Kraus received All-California Interscholastic Federation (CIF) and All-Sea View League recognition in 2001, 2002, and 2003, and was recognized as a CIF Scholar-Athlete each of her four years at Foothill. Kraus was awarded CIF Division I co-Player of the Year, Sea View League Co-MVP honors, and Los Angeles Times All-Star Girls' Water Polo First Team honors in 2004, and also competed for the SoCal club team and the USA National Youth Team. In 2004 she was also awarded the United States Army Reserve National Scholar-Athlete medal, was named to the 2003-2004 NISCA Girls All America Water Polo First Team, and earned All-Sea View League first-team honors as a swimmer.

She won a gold medal in the 2005 FINA Junior Water Polo World Championships.

== College ==
Kraus helped her UCLA Bruins women's water polo team win four consecutive NCAA Women's Water Polo Championships, including in May 2008.

In 2005 she scored 27 goals on 54 attempts, and had 36 steals, 10 assists, and six earned exclusions. She also helped lead the U.S. Junior National Team to a gold medal in Australia at the FINA Junior Women's World Championships.

In 2006 she scored 40 goals on 69 attempts, scoring at a team-best 57 percent rate, and had 24 steals, eight assists, and 13 earned exclusions. She received ACWPC All-America, All-Mountain Pacific Sports Federation (MPSF) honorable mention, and MPSF All-Academic Team honors, and was named the MPSF Player of the Week on April 18.

In 2007, she scored 54 goals on 110 attempts, with 28 steals, 15 assists, and 19 earned exclusions. She earned first-team ACWPC All-America, first-team All-MPSF, and MPSF All-Academic Team honors.

In 2008, she scored 57 goals (tied for the 11th-highest single-season goals total in program history) on 141 attempts, with 41 steals, 36 earned exclusions, 10 assists, and seven blocks. She received MPSF Co-Player of the Year honors with classmate Courtney Mathewson, was named a first-team ACWPC All-America selection and first-team All-MPSF honoree for the second consecutive year, received MPSF All-Academic Team honors for the third straight season, and was named to the NCAA All-Tournament First Team. She received the 2008 Marty Glickman Outstanding Jewish Scholastic Athlete of the Year Award from the National Jewish Sports Hall of Fame. She was a finalist for the 2008 Peter J. Cutino Award, which is presented annually to the outstanding female and male collegiate water polo players in the United States. Kraus and UCLA's national champion teams of 2007-08 visited the White House June 24, 2008. She received a kiss on the cheek from President George Bush.

The 178 goals in her four seasons placed her as the fourth-highest career goals total in program history, and her 129 steals also placed her in the top 10. Kraus graduated UCLA with a degree in political science.

== Team USA, and accolades ==
She later received her MBA from University of California, Irvine Paul Merage School of Business, and was an assistant coach for UC Irvine Women’s Water Polo Team for three years. She then became Vice President of Business Development at Brainard Strategy.

She competed on the 2009–11 and 2013-14 United States women's national water polo teams.

In 2010 Kraus was inducted into the Southern California Jewish Sports Hall of Fame.
