= Tustin Legacy, Tustin, California =

Planned community in Tustin, California, United States

Coordinates: 33°42′08″N 117°48′56″W

Tustin Legacy is a 1,600-acre (6.5 km^{2}) planned community in Tustin, California being developed on the former Marine Corps Air Station Tustin. The project, under construction, will include parks, a commercial retail center and various densities of housing, for a total of 4,600 units.

The district includes 4,049 units of housing within Tustin's jurisdiction, and over nine million square feet of commercial and institutional development.

== Commercial ==
The project's main shopping center, named "The District", opened in August 2007. It covers an area of 1,000,000 square feet (93,000 m^{2}).

The Village at Tustin Legacy is a 22-acre retail neighborhood retail center developed by Regency Centers. It features a Stater Brothers grocery store, a CVS Pharmacy, and additional shops restaurants, and offices. It will be located next to Columbus Square, bounded by Edinger, Tustin Ranch, Valencia and Kensington Park.

== Institutional ==
In September 2007, the Orange County Sheriff's Regional Training Academy opened on the corner of Warner Avenue and Armstrong Avenue. It includes classrooms, a running track and mock village where recruits can practice their skills.

The South Orange County Community College District's newest campus called Advanced Technology & Education Park (ATEP) is located in Tustin Legacy. Initial classes began in August 2007.

The first school built, is a 10-acre (40,000 m^{2}) K-5 elementary school called Heritage School, which is not currently being used for its intended purpose. It is currently the "temporary" home of Tustin Adult School & Sycamore High School, a continuation learning facility. The residents of Columbus Square do not yet have a K–12 school for their children as it is reported that there are not enough elementary school aged children in the area to open the school.

Legacy Magnet Academy is a magnet academy for grades 6 through 12 located in the Tustin Legacy community adjacent to Tustin's Columbus Square and Huntley villages.

In November 2015, a United States Army Reserve center opened on the corner of Red Hill Avenue and Warner Avenue.

In March 2018, Orange County Animal Care opened a 30,000 square-foot shelter sitting on 10 acres on the corner of Victory Road and Armstrong Avenue.

== Residential ==
The first community built, Tustin Field, consisting of Tustin Field I and Tustin Field II, was completed in 2006. Tustin Field I consists of 376 housing units and Tustin Field II consists of 189 housing units. The second community called Villages of Columbus, consisting of Columbus Square and Columbus Grove was completed in 2013. Columbus Square has a total of 1,075 total housing units and 240 senior apartments (Coventry Court). Columbus Grove has 465 total housing units. The third community, Greenwood in Tustin Legacy, consists of 375 housing units and was completed in 2017. On the corner of Valencia South Loop Road and Warner is The St. Anton Apartments which are 225 apartments. Amalfi is Located on Legacy Road and Tustin Ranch Road.
