= Matt McLain =

American baseball player (born 1999)

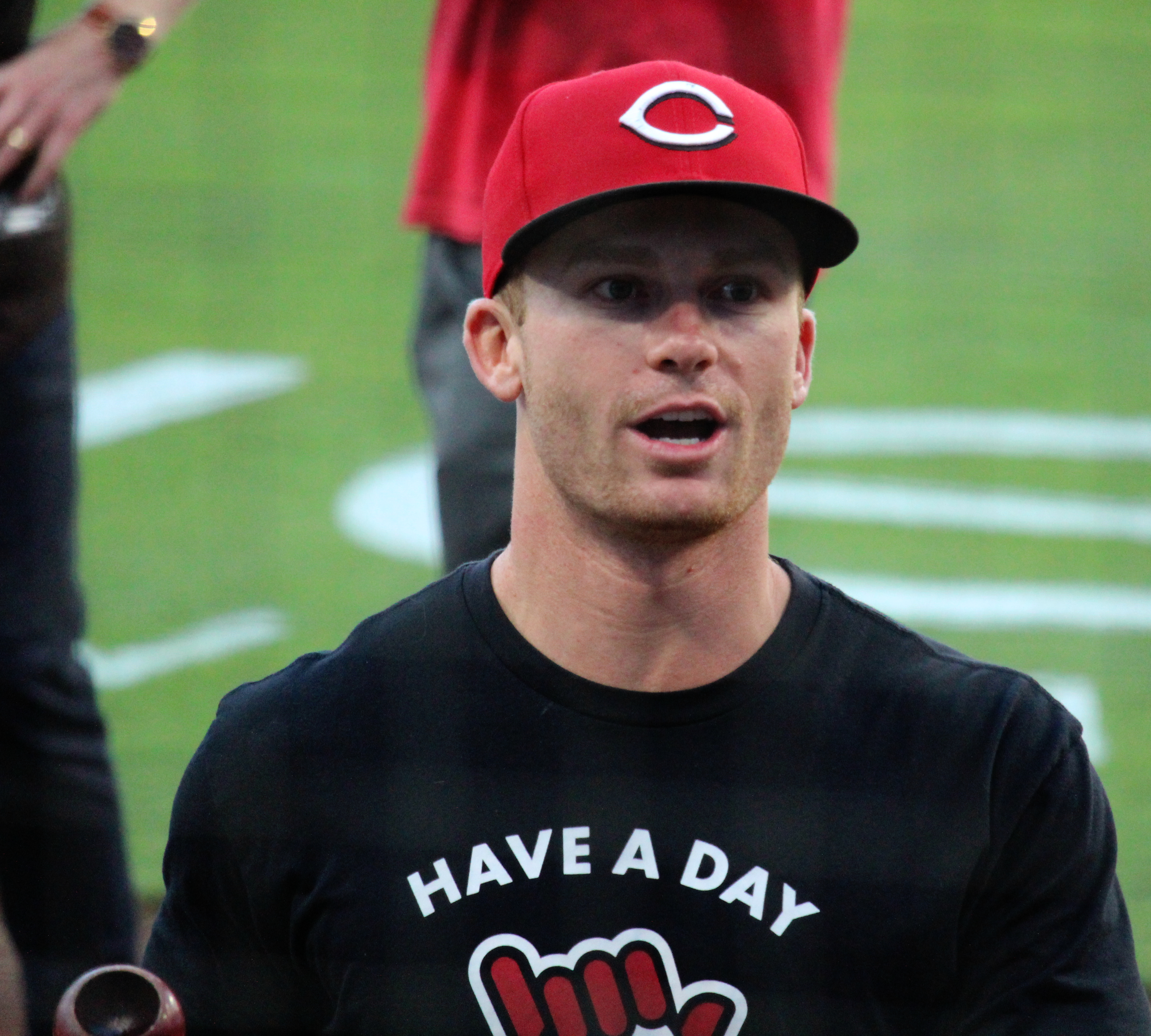
- McLain with the Reds in 2025

Cincinnati Reds – No. 9
- Shortstop / Second baseman
- Born: August 6, 1999 (age 27); Orange, California, U.S.
- Bats: Right Throws: Right

MLB debut
- May 15, 2023, for the Cincinnati Reds

MLB statistics (through 2026 season)
- Batting average: .228
- Home runs: 46
- Runs batted in: 140
- Stats at Baseball Reference

Teams
- Cincinnati Reds (2023, 2025–present)

Matthew Michael McLain (born August 6, 1999) is an American professional baseball infielder for the Cincinnati Reds of Major League Baseball (MLB). He played college baseball for the UCLA Bruins. The Reds selected McLain with the 17th overall pick in the 2021 MLB draft and he made his MLB debut in 2023.

== Amateur career ==
McLain attended Arnold O. Beckman High School in Irvine, California. He committed to attend the University of California, Los Angeles (UCLA), to play college baseball for the UCLA Bruins. As a high school senior, he batted .369 with three home runs. He was selected by the Arizona Diamondbacks in the first round with the 25th overall selection of the 2018 Major League Baseball draft. However, he did not sign, and instead chose to enroll at UCLA.

During the summer of 2018, McLain played in the West Coast League for the Bellingham Bells, and was awarded the Top Prospect Award. As a freshman at UCLA in 2019, he appeared in 61 games (with sixty being starts) in which he slashed .203/.276/.355 with four home runs and thirty RBIs. That summer, he played collegiate summer baseball with the Wareham Gatemen of the Cape Cod Baseball League, and was West division MVP of the league's all-star game. In 2020, McLain played in 13 games and batted .397 with four home runs before the season was cancelled due to the COVID-19 pandemic. In 2021, he missed three weeks due to a fractured thumb, but still hit .333 with nine home runs and 36 RBIs in 47 games.

== Professional career ==
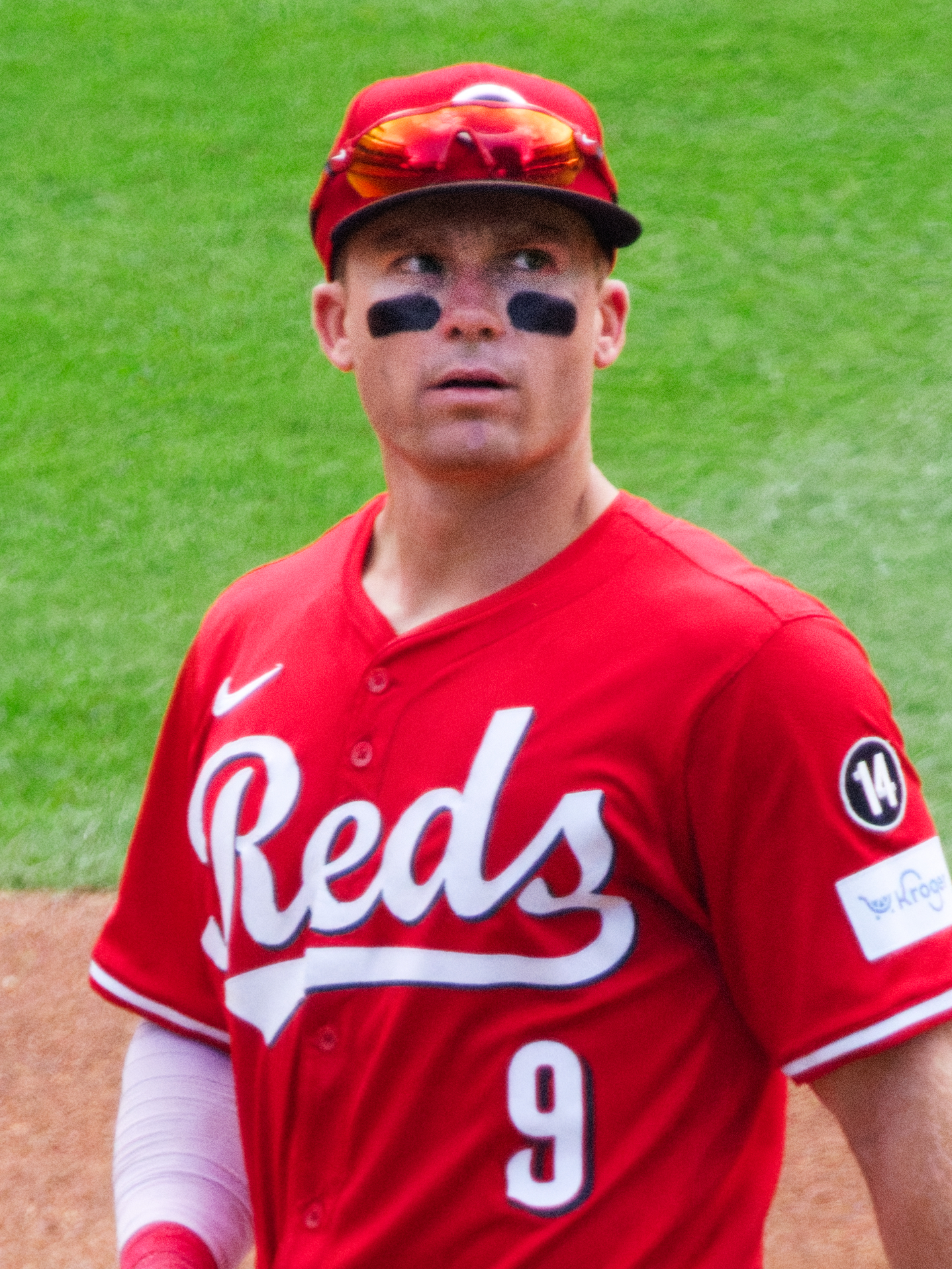
McLain in 2025

The Cincinnati Reds selected McLain in the first round, with the 17th overall pick, in the 2021 Major League Baseball draft. McLain signed with the Reds on July 26, 2021.

McLain made his professional debut with the Rookie-level Arizona Complex League Reds and was promoted to the Dayton Dragons of the High-A Central. Over 31 games between the two teams, he slashed .283/.389/.462 with three home runs, 19 RBIs, and ten stolen bases. For the 2022 season, he was promoted to the Reds' Double-A affiliate, the Chattanooga Lookouts. In 103 games for Chattanooga, McLain slashed .232/.363/.453 with 17 home runs, 58 RBI, and 27 stolen bases. McLain was assigned to the Triple-A Louisville Bats to begin the 2023 season. In 38 games, McLain hit .348/.474/.710 with 12 home runs, 40 RBI, and 10 stolen bases.

On May 15, 2023, the Reds announced that McLain would be promoted to the major leagues for the first time the following day. In 89 games for Cincinnati, he batted .290/.357/.507 with 16 home runs, 50 RBI, and 14 stolen bases. On August 28, McLain was placed on the injured list with a right oblique strain. He began a rehab assignment with Triple–A Louisville on September 23, however he was shut down for the season on September 26 after aggravating the injury.

On March 26, 2024, McLain underwent shoulder surgery to repair the labrum and some damaged cartilage, ruling him out indefinitely.

After McLain's return, his next injury stint occurred on April 4, 2025 with his hamstring which caused him to miss two games. His most recent injury happened on July 8, 2026 with an injured calf.

In his first postseason performance against the Dodgers in 2025, he went 2-7 with one double and five strikeouts, batting .286.

McLain had a full 2026 season where he batted a .185 average in 134 games with 15 home runs and 40 RBI.

== Personal life ==
McLain's brothers, Nick and Sean, also play professional baseball.
