= The District (Tustin) =

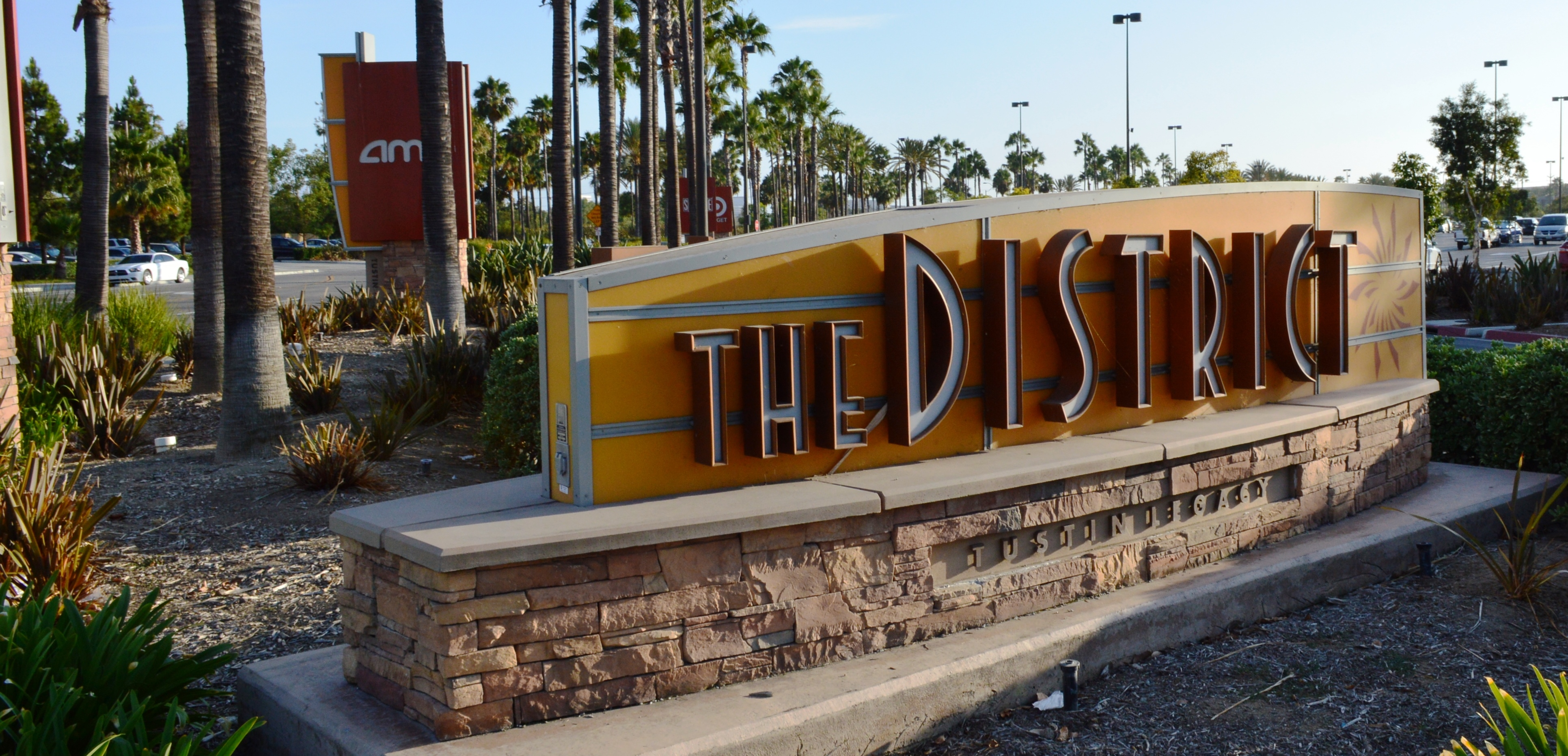
- Location: Tustin, California; United States
- Coordinates: 33.6977°N 117.8268°W
- Address: 2437 Park Ave, Tustin, CA 92782
- Opened: August 17, 2007
- Developer: Vestar Development Co.
- Parking: Parking lot, Valet Parking
- Website: thedistricttl.com

The District is a large outdoor shopping center and entertainment hub in Tustin, California. It was developed by Vestar Development Co. and was the largest shopping center in Orange County to open in more than a decade when it opened in 2007. The shopping center features a 14-screen movie theater managed by AMC, a bowling alley, a large industrial themed food hall named Union Market, along with other restaurants for entertainment. The center features more big-box retailers and specialty shops than high-end fashion retailers, such as Costco, Lowe's, Target, TJMaxx/Home Goods, Whole Foods Market, Michaels, Ulta Beauty, Vans and Tillys, due to its proximity to South Coast Plaza, Fashion Island, and Irvine Spectrum Center.

== History ==
The shopping center held its grand opening on August 17, 2007. It was built on some of the land that was part of the former Tustin Military Base which closed in 1999. As of 2017, one of the bases famous blimp hangars still stands right behind Lowe's. The center opened with stores that were similar or had locations at the nearby Market Place, which opened 19 years earlier.

Borders closed in 2011 due to the chain's liquidation. Best Buy closed in 2012 as part of a plan to close 50 stores nationwide, and was replaced with Aki-Home. DSW, also an original tenant, closed and was replaced by Planet Fitness in 2017. Union Market, a postmodern food hall, opened in the former Borders in 2016 after many delays. The food hall features more local food stands unlike traditional food courts, along with recycled vintage stores and clothing boutiques. Bar Louie announced that it would be opening its first Orange County location in a space formerly occupied by Panera and Justice in 2017.
