= The Market Place (Orange County, California) =

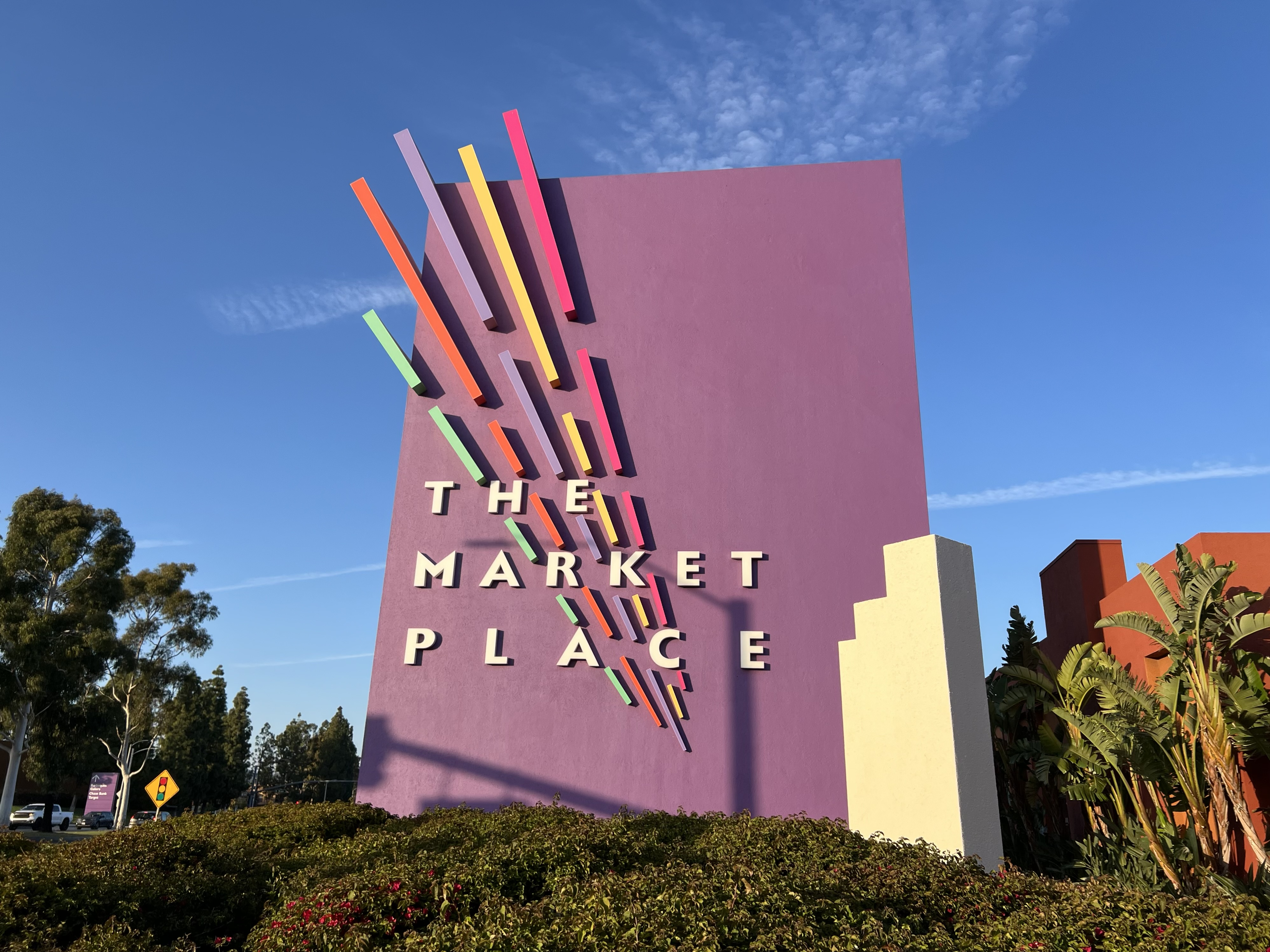
- A marquee for the shopping center
- Location: Tustin and Irvine, California, United States
- Coordinates: 33.7238°N 117.7945°W
- Address: The Market Place, 2961 El Camino Real, Tustin, CA 92782
- Opened: 1988
- Developer: The Irvine Company
- Owner: Irvine Company
- Architect: Ricardo Legorreta; Leason/Pomeroy Associates
- Num. of stores: 122
- Num. of anchor tenants: 9
- Website: http://www.shopthemarketplace.com.

The Market Place (also known as the Tustin Market Place or the Tustin/Irvine Market Place) is an outdoor shopping center located in Orange County, California. Opened in 1988, the center is located along Jamboree Road and Interstate 5, straddling the borders of Irvine and Tustin. The Market Place features 140 tenants including Athleta, Amazon Fresh, Lazy Dog Restaurant & Bar, Nordstrom Rack, REI, Sephora and Texas de Brazil. The property is owned and managed by The Irvine Company.

== Design ==
The Market Place covers an area of 165 acres (670,000 m^{2}) and has more than 120 stores, restaurants, cafes and theaters. Designed by Mexican architect Ricardo Legorreta, it consists of monumental but extremely simplified cubic forms, with anchor stores marked by massive towers roughly 70 feet (21 m) high displaying the store name. The center is also unique in that all the store signs are displayed in neon. The overall design operates on the idea that center's tenants add most of the color and character to the otherwise plain center, a concept that had previously (though unsuccessfully) been attempted with Britain's Tricorn Centre. The buildings are arranged in a ring around a large central series of parking lots and fast-food restaurants. The center on the whole has a "desert" look to it, with parking lots shaded under groves of date palms, and extensive rock landscaping around the perimeter of the center. The parking lots are illuminated by arrays of xenon floodlights set inside the peaks of 100-foot (30 m) high towers. The buildings themselves are uniformly surfaced in bright orange, purple, and pink stucco.

== History ==
=== Phase 1 ===
Construction of Phase I began in 1988 on the Tustin (northwest) side of Jamboree Road, and this phase was opened in three distinct sections. The first section opened in 1988, with 400,000 square feet (40,000 m^{2}) of space allotted for home improvement (The Home Depot), furnishings/decor retail stores including the second STØR location (became IKEA in 1992 which relocated to Costa Mesa in 2003, now Best Buy and REI), and a Home Express store (later became Toys R Us, now Nordstrom Rack). The second section of Phase I opened in 1989, with 240,000 square feet (22,000 m^{2}) of soft goods and apparel stores like Ross Dress for Less, Kids R Us (later became CompUSA, now Sprouts Farmers Market), and T.J. Maxx and electronics stores like The Good Guys! (now PetSmart). The third and final section of Phase I opened in 1990, with 120,000 square feet (11,000 m^{2}) of restaurants, services and a six-screen Edwards movie theater complex.

=== Phase 2 ===
In 1996, Phase II of the Tustin Market Place opened on the Irvine (southeast) side of Jamboree Road. This phase expanded the Market Place by 420,000 square feet (39,000 m^{2}), adding stores like Sports Authority (closed in 2016), OfficeMax (relocated to another space in 2012, closed in 2021, original location later became Stein Mart), Bed Bath & Beyond, Circuit City (now 24 Hour Fitness), and Babies R Us (now Amazon Fresh), restaurants and a 10-screen Edwards Stadium Theater.

=== Phase 3 ===
Phase III, also on the Irvine (southeast) side of Jamboree Road, opened in 1999. Another 420,000 square feet (39,000 m^{2}) of retail space were added to the Market Place in this phase, which included a new Lowe's store (closed 2019, now Mathis Brothers Furniture), a large food court, and a Target store.

=== Later Additions ===
The newer 10-screen Edwards theater, which opened as part of Phase 2, operated alongside the original 6-screen theater built in Phase 1, which was also operated by Edwards, until 2012 when the older six-screen theater closed, due to more people going to the newer theater across the street as well as the new AMC Tustin 14 at the District at Tustin Legacy. A community center operated by the City of Tustin opened in 2014 in the space originally occupied by the six-screen theater.

In Spring 2014, three new restaurants were added in close proximity to the existing Best Buy store. A Chase Bank branch and a Food Court were also added close to the existing Lowe's store.

The Market Place added a Starbucks, with a drive through, and an Urban Plates restaurant near the former Lowe's building in late 2015. A new building was added close to the theater to accommodate the two new restaurants.

The former Babies R Us space was renovated to hold one of the first Amazon Fresh stores, a new grocery store concept by Amazon, which opened in October 2020.
