= Golden 1 Credit Union =

Credit union in California

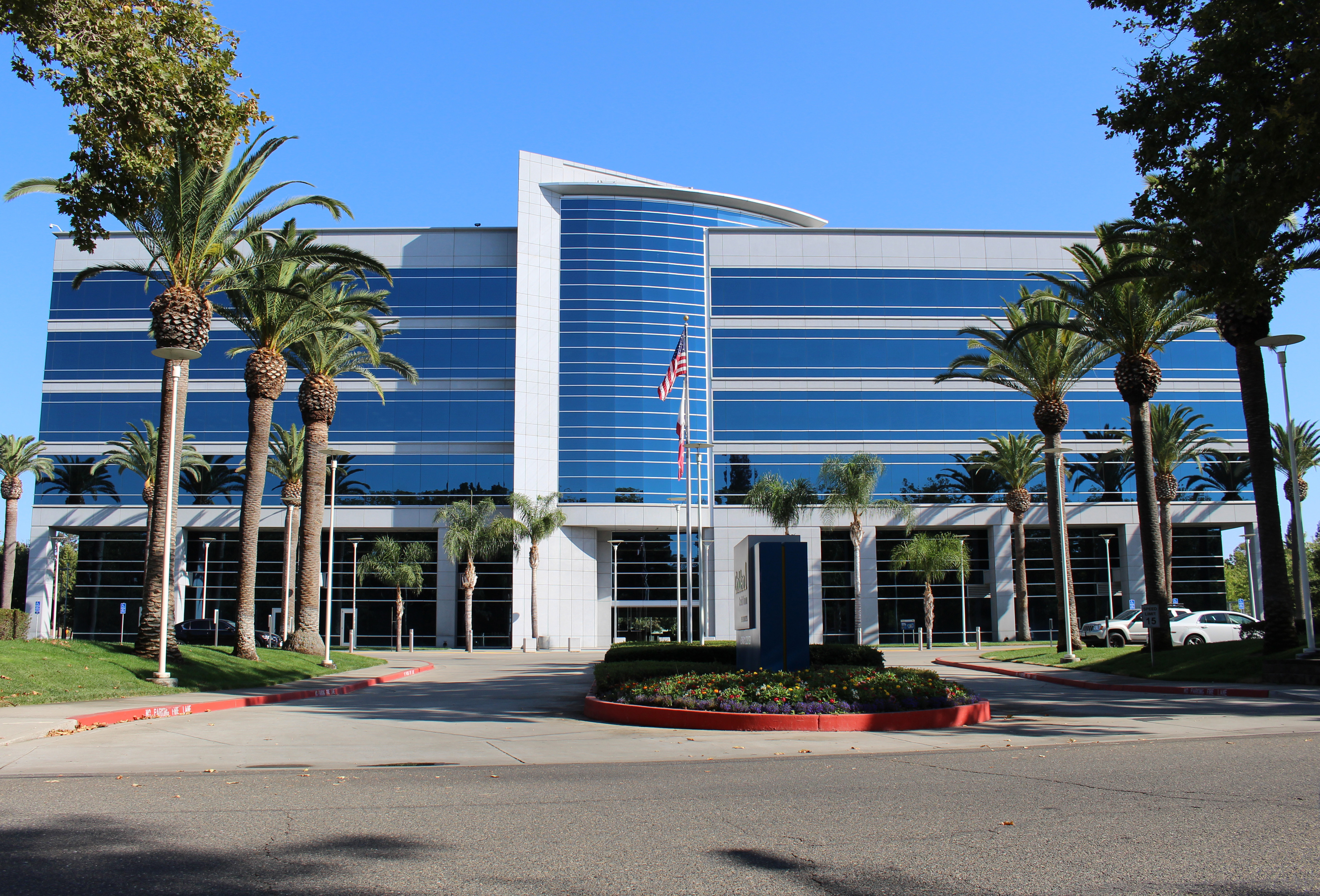
- Golden 1 headquarters in Sacramento
- Formerly: California State Employees’ Credit Union #1
- Type: Credit Union
- Industry: Financial services
- Founded: (1933)
- Headquarters: Sacramento, California, U.S.
- Number of locations: 70 branches (2026)
- Key people: Donna A. Bland (President & CEO)
- Products: Checking, savings, consumer loans, mortgage loans, credit cards, online banking, investments, insurance
- Revenue: $1.15 billion (2025)
- Net income: $110 million (2026)
- Total assets: $22.2 billion USD (2026)
- Members: 1.2 million (2026)
- Number of employees: 2,000+ (2026)
- Website: golden1.com

Golden 1 Credit Union (or Golden 1) is a credit union headquartered in Sacramento, California. Golden 1 is one of the nation's largest credit unions and the second largest credit union in the State of California. It currently serves its members throughout California with more than 70 branches, including home loan and financial resource centers, and over 30,000 CO-OP ATMs nationwide.

== History ==
Founded in 1933 as California State Employees' Credit Union #1, the credit union officially changed its name to Golden 1 in 1977.

Golden 1 launched its college scholarship program in 2013, and has since granted approximately $5.5 million to nearly 600 Californians.

On June 16, 2015, Golden 1 acquired naming rights for a new arena in the heart of downtown Sacramento to replace the Sacramento Kings' Sleep Train Arena. This investment cost $120 million over 20 years, with an average annual value at $6 million. It is one of the largest naming rights deals for a single-tenant NBA arena and the first time a credit union has put its name on a major sports facility.

In June 2018, Golden 1 became the first state-chartered credit union to be granted statewide field of membership in California. This made Golden 1 one of the nation's largest credit unions and the second largest credit union in the State of California.

In 2023, Golden 1 was included as part of Fast Company’s “Brands That Matter” list. It also pledged $10 million to invest in Del Paso Heights over five years in order to improve equity and economic inclusion. The following year, the credit union opened its first financial resource center, also located in that community. Its second financial resource center opened in Madera, California in October 2025.

In 2025, Golden 1 was included as part of American Banker’s “Best Credit Unions to Work For” list for its fifth consecutive year as well as Forbes’ and TIME’s “America’s Best Midsize Employers” ranking.

In 2026, Forbes included Golden 1 on its “America’s Dream Employers” list, whereas Newsweek and USA Today ranked the company on the “America’s Best Regional Banks & Credit Unions” and “America’s Best Customer Service in Financial Services” lists, respectively.

As of 2026, Golden 1 had over US$22 billion in assets and more than 1.2 million members.The current President & CEO is Donna A. Bland.

== Operations ==
Golden 1 serves its members throughout California with more than 70 branches, including home loan and financial resource centers, and over 30,000 CO-OP ATMs nationwide. It provides relief programs for those needing financial stability assistance amid pay disruption or unexpected circumstances. Golden 1 also offers payroll assistance loan programs, providing interest free, 60-day loans equal to a member's net federal payroll deposit for one month.

In September 2026, Golden 1 expanded its business offerings to include ACH and wire services, digital banking tools, and services with business checking, savings and money market accounts. Its members also have access to Clover and payroll services through Paychex.
