= SchoolsFirst Federal Credit Union =

American credit union

- Type: Credit union
- Industry: Financial services
- Founded: 1934
- Headquarters: Tustin, California, United States
- Number of locations: 70 Branches (2022)
- Area served: Educators and family Members in California
- Key people: Bill Cheney (CEO); Kristine Wetzel (Chairman of the Board)
- Products: Savings; Checking; Consumer loans; Auto loans; Mortgages; Credit cards; Investments; Retirement; Insurances; Online banking; Mobile banking
- Total assets: $37.23B USD (2026)
- Members: 1,579,561 (2026)
- Number of employees: 2,342 (2026)
- Website: SchoolsFirstFCU.org

SchoolsFirst Federal Credit Union is a federally chartered credit union that serves the educational community in California. It is headquartered in Tustin, California, and has branches throughout California. Before April 14, 2008, it was named Orange County Teachers Federal Credit Union, or OCTFCU.

== History ==
SchoolsFirst FCU was founded in 1934 as Orange County Teachers Credit Union. A group of 126 school employees pooled $1,200 to establish it under a California state charter. In 1985, the credit union converted to a federal charter and became Orange County Teachers Federal Credit Union.

It reported having over 800,000 members in 2019.

As of December 31, 2022, its asset size had grown to $26.9 billion, capital to asset ratio of 9.87%, and the total membership had increased to 1.2 million.

In early 2019, SchoolsFirst and Schools Financial announced plans to merge, pending regulatory and member approval. Both credit unions stated that no branches or employees would be closed or laid off as a result of the merger.

SchoolsFirst FCU was voted Best Credit Union in Orange County, California, in 2020 by the Orange County Register and LA Times Reader's Choice.

It was also voted Forbes Best In-State Credit Union in California 2019-2023.
