= Arnold O. Beckman High School =

Public secondary school in Irvine, California, United States

Coordinates: 33.7176°N 117.78246°W

- 3588 Bryan Ave. Irvine, California 92602-1347; United States

Information
- Type: Public
- Motto: Be Tru. Be Blu. Be YOU!
- Established: August 30, 2004
- Status: Operational
- School district: Tustin Unified School District
- Principal: Donnie Rafter
- Staff: 103.38 (FTE)
- Grades: 9–12
- Enrollment: 2,713 (2023-2024)
- Student to teacher ratio: 26.24
- Hours in school day: 7.75/7.5 Hours
- Colors: Red, white, and blue
- Athletics conference: Pacific Coast Conference
- Mascot: Patrick the Patriot
- Nickname: Patriots
- Rival: Irvine High School
- Newspaper: Beckman Chronicle
- Yearbook: The Anthem
- Feeder schools: Pioneer Middle School; Orchard Hills School; Columbus Tustin Middle School
- Television: Beckman Beat
- Website: beckman.tustin.k12.ca.us

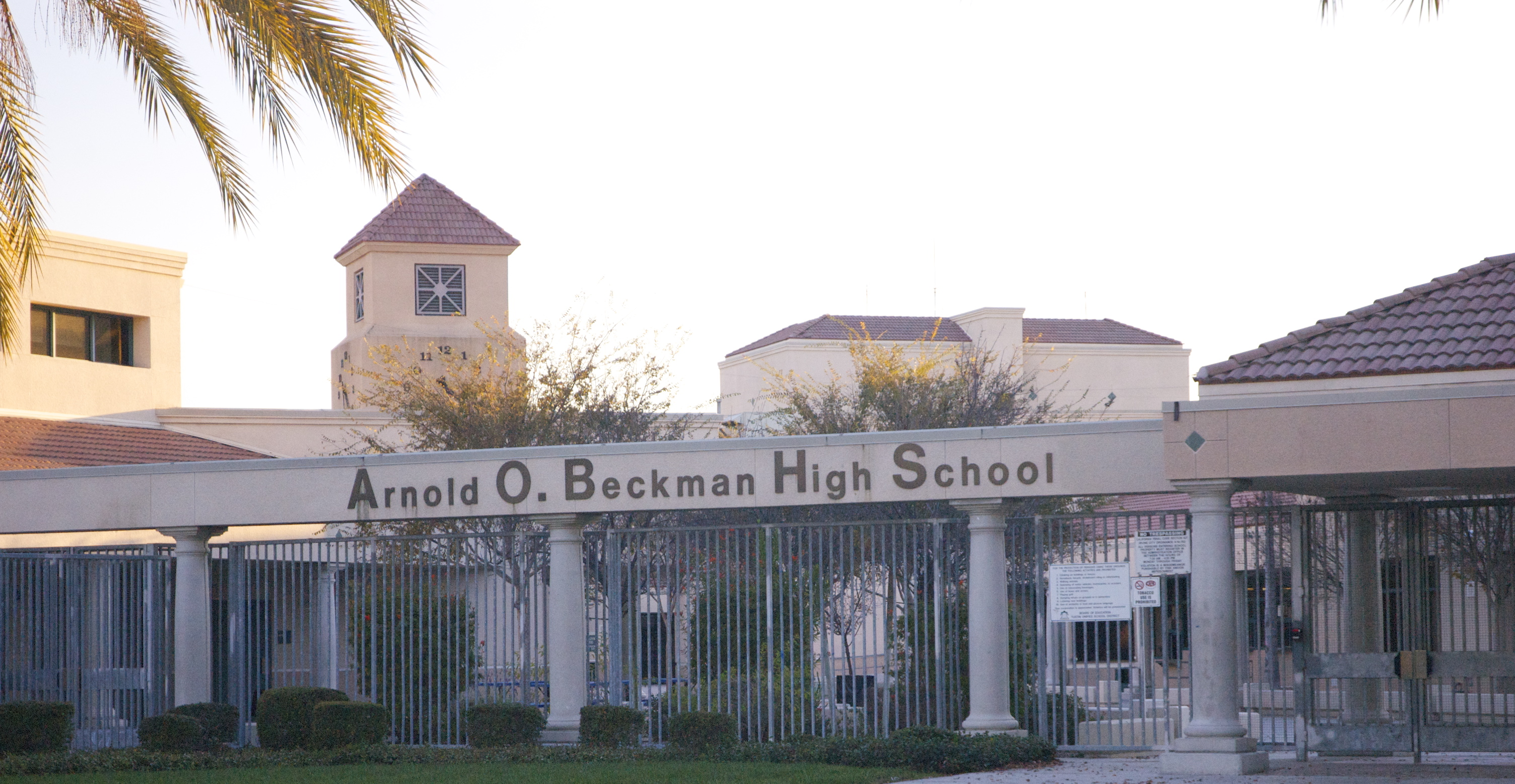
Arnold O. Beckman High School

Arnold O. Beckman High School is a public school in Irvine, California, United States, serving 3,013 students from grades 9 through 12. The $94 million facility was opened on August 30, 2004. The World Languages Building - a new, $17 million, two-story, 30,000-square-foot facility - was unveiled on September 1, 2015. The school is commonly known as Beckman and is named after Arnold Orville Beckman: a scientist, chemist, and philanthropist famed for inventing the pH scale during his tenure at Caltech and funding Silicon Valley's first semiconductor company (Shockley Semiconductor Laboratory, a division of Beckman Instruments, Inc.).

Since its founding in 2004, Beckman has been awarded the status of a California Distinguished School by the California State Board of Education in 2007, 2011, 2015, and 2019. Beckman serves communities of Irvine and Tustin, including Tustin Ranch, Northpark, Orchard Hills, and West Irvine, as well as a small portion of Tustin and Santa Ana. Although its facilities are physically located in Irvine, the school is administered by Tustin Unified School District. Beckman's mascot is the Patriot.

Beckman is accredited by the Western Association of Schools and Colleges (WASC) and is also a member of the National Association for College Admission Counseling (NACAC) and complies with the NACAC Statement of Principles of Good Practice.

== Visual arts ==
In 2008 a visual arts student at Beckman High, won first place in Orange County in the Imagination Celebration Poster Contest. The works of other students were selected to be exhibited at the Orange County Fine Arts Gallery as well.

In 2007, a student won second place in the photography division of the Music Center Spotlight Awards.

In 2008, the school hosted televised performances by Miley Cyrus and Metro Station as part of MTV's New Year's Eve special; the network had awarded a visit by Cyrus to a Beckman student, who was honored for her charitable contributions to breast cancer awareness via the school's "Pink Ribbon Club".

In 2009, a student won the grand prize in the Olympus Student Photo Contest as well as the Adobe Youth Voices contest.

== Athletics ==
Beckman's athletics program include teams in football, water polo, swimming, basketball, volleyball, baseball, softball, soccer, lacrosse, tennis, wrestling, cross country, track and field, golf, dance, and cheer.

=== Volleyball ===
The Beckman varsity volleyball team won the state championship in 2007–08.

=== Baseball ===
Beckman plays its home games at Patriot Park, and won the CIF–SS Championship, defeating Woodbridge High School 4-1 at Dodger Stadium.

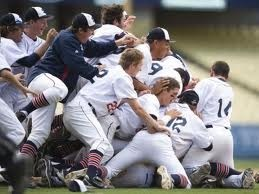

In 2011, James Kaprielian was CIF Player of the Year. In 2015, Kaprielian was drafted in the 1st round of the MLB Draft (16th overall – New York Yankees) In 2018, shortstop Matt McLain was drafted in the 1st Round of the MLB Draft. (25th overall - Arizona Diamondbacks)

=== Golf ===
Beckman's 2014 men's golf team won the CIF- Southern Section at Talega Golf Club. This was the first CIF Championships in Beckman golf history.

== Incidents ==
In February 2023 a teacher at the school was arrested for placing video cameras in student bathrooms at the school. Siu-Kong Sit, the school's robotics coach, admitted to hiding cameras and collecting photographic and video material since at least February 2020. Sit also admitted to having recorded students in a hotel bathroom at a Texas robotics tournament in May 2022. In March 2024, Sit pleaded guilty to one count of possession of child pornography and was sentenced to 17-and-a-half years in prison.

== Notable alumni ==
- James Kaprielian - pitcher for the Diablos Rojos del México.
- Matt McLain - shortstop for the Cincinnati Reds, 17th pick overall 2021 MLB Draft.
