= Tustin Unified School District =

School district in California

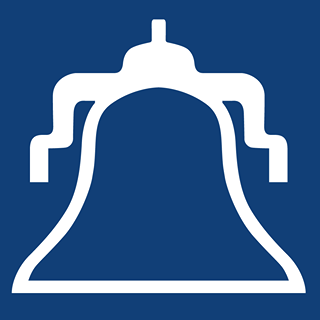

Address
- 300 South "C" Street Tustin Tustin, Orange, California, 92780; United States

District information
- Type: Public school district
- Motto: A Legacy of Excellence
- Grades: K-12, Adult School
- Established: 1 July 1972; 54 years ago
- Superintendent: Dr. Mark Johnson
- Business administrator: Dr. Grant Litfin
- School board: Tustin Unified School District Board of Education
- Chair of the board: Lynn Davis
- Director of education: Chris Matos, Maggie Villegas, Ed. D.
- Governing agency: Orange County Department of Education
- Schools: 28
- Budget: $66.3 million (2020-21)

Students and staff
- Enrollment: 24,000 (July 2020)
- Staff: 2,250
- Student–teacher ratio: 26.2
- Athletic conference: Pacific Coast League, Empire League, North Hills League, Crestview League
- Colors: Blue

Other information
- Schedule: High School: 8:30am to 3:35pm Middle School: 8:30am to 2:05pm Elementary School: 8:00am to 2:23pm Legacy Magnet Academy Middle School: 8:30am to 2:55pm Legacy Magnet Academy High School: 8:30am to 3:25pm
- Website: www.tustin.k12.ca.us

Tustin Unified School District was created from the 1972 voter-approved unification of the Tustin Elementary School District and the Tustin Union High School District. It is located in Tustin, a city in Orange County, California. Its district territory comprises Tustin, the unincorporated community of North Tustin, and parts of the cities of Irvine and Santa Ana. It has 18 elementary schools, five middle schools, four high schools, one K-8 school, and one adult school.

== History ==
In the 1800s, Columbus Tustin bought 839 acres (3.40 km^{2}) of land to found the city of Tustin. In 1872, he built a schoolhouse and donated to the community, founding what was then called the Sycamore School District. In 1889, the district was renamed the Tustin School District. In 1922, Tustin Union High School opened separately, finally merging with the Tustin School district in 1972 to create the Tustin Unified School District.

In 2003 the Orange Unified School District gave territory to Tustin USD.

== Schools ==
There are currently 14 elementary schools in the Tustin Unified School District: Arroyo Elementary School, Barbara Benson Elementary School, Benjamin Beswick Elementary School, Helen Estock Elementary School, Guin Foss Elementary School, Robert Heideman Elementary School, Heritage Elementary School, Hicks Canyon Elementary School, Ladera Elementary School, Loma Vista Elementary School, Myford Elementary School, W.R. Nelson Elementary School, Peters Canyon Elementary School, Red Hill Elementary School (Tustin), Tustin Memorial Academy, Tustin Ranch Elementary School.

There are 3 current K-8 schools: Orchard Hills School, Sycamore Magnet School (TK-8)

The District has 4 Middle Schools: Columbus Tustin Middle School, Hewes Middle School, Pioneer Middle School, C.E. Utt Middle School, & Legacy Magnet Academy (6-12).

The District has 4 high schools which serves a variety of local cities:

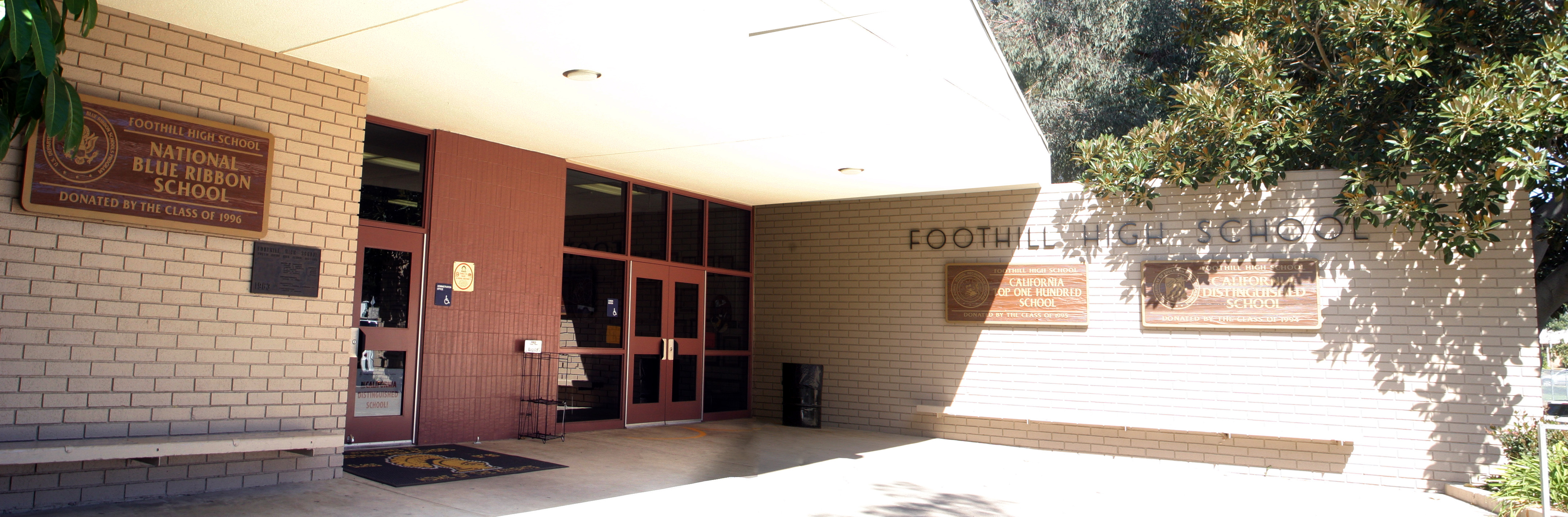
The Foothill High School front office

- Arnold O. Beckman High School
- Foothill High School
- Tustin High School
- Legacy Magnet Academy (6-12)
- Hillview High School (continuation)

There is one school that serves grades 6-12: Legacy Magnet Academy. This school has 4 main focuses, simplified through the acronym TIDE: Technology, Innovation, Design, and Entrepreneurship.

=== Defunct Schools ===
- Marjorie Veeh Elementary School
- C.C. Lambert Elementary School
- Currie Middle School
- Thorman Elementary School
- Del Norte Elementary School

=== Adult school ===
In addition to serving children, the Tustin Unified School District serves education to adults (18 years of age or older) and offers services such as:

- ESL - English as a Second Language
- CTE - Career Technical Education Pathways at its Tustin Adult School.

== Technology ==
In 2013, the Tustin Unified School District, under the Measure S taxation of local residents, adopted a technology program for all of its schools. Elementary and middle schools received Apple iPads and Chromebooks. In their high schools, a Lenovo laptop and Chromebook system were introduced to the students. In 2019, the district opted to update their technology program by signing with Apple for its Elementary and middle schools, and switched to Microsoft's Surface Pro for their high schools. Additionally, the school also signed with Adobe to allow students to receive Adobe Cloud programs such as: Photoshop, Premiere Pro, and After Effects. These programs are free to all students in the district.
