= North Tustin, California =

North Tustin, California Tustin Foothills (until 2005)
- Unincorporated community Census-designated place
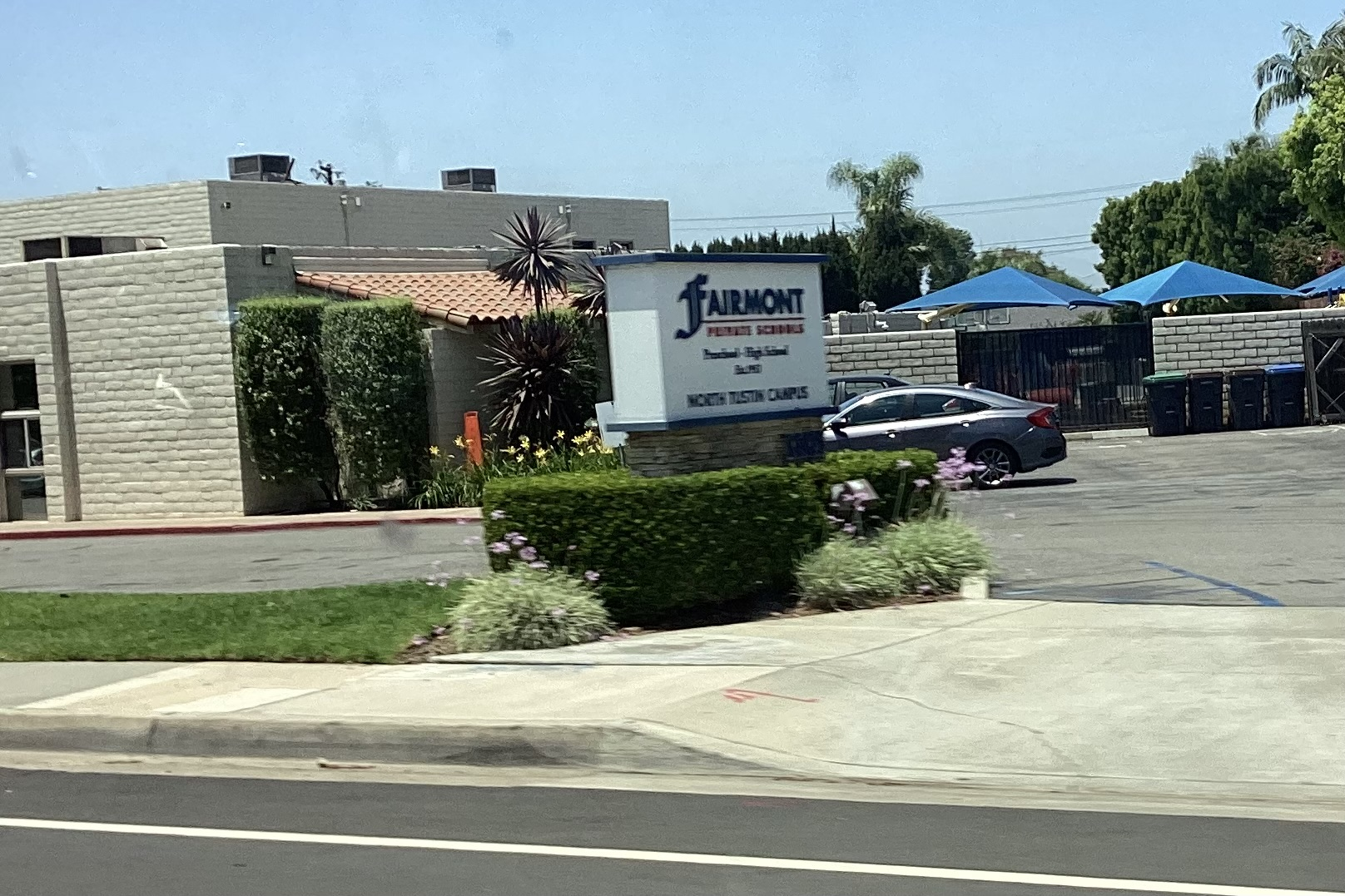
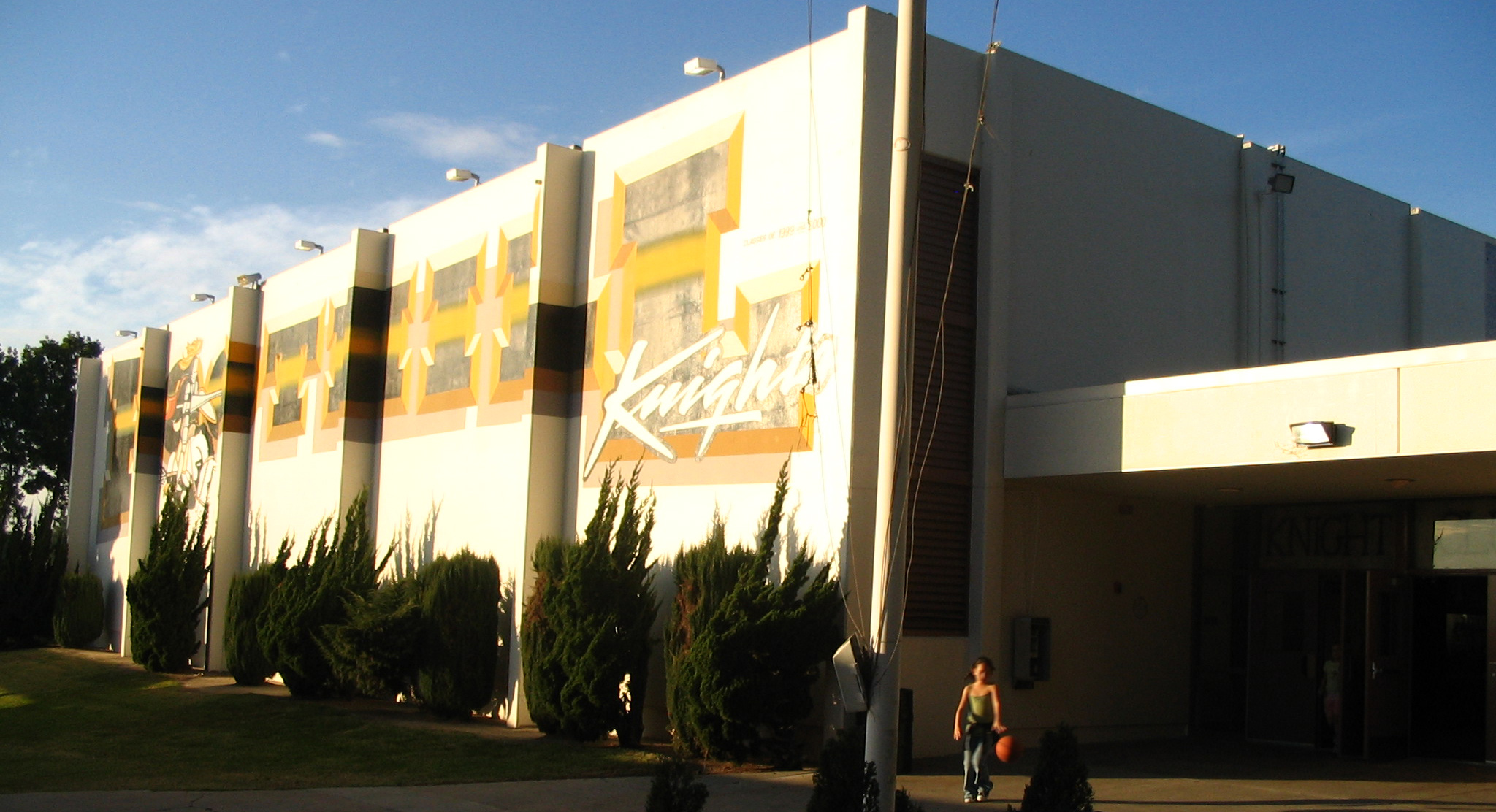
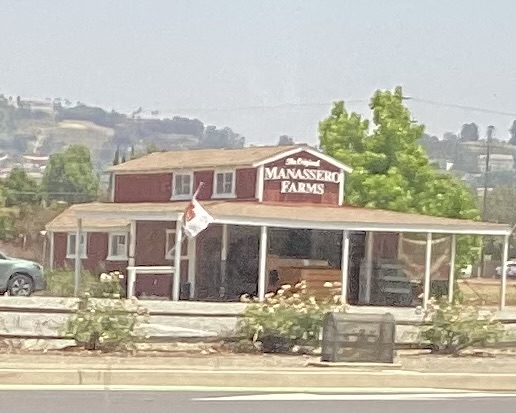
- Clockwise from top: Fairmont Private Schools campus, Foothill High School gym, Manassero Farms
- Interactive map of North Tustin, California
- Location in California Location in the United States
- Coordinates: 33°45′54″N 117°47′57″W
- Country: United States
- State: California
- County: Orange

Area
  - Total: 6.581 sq mi (17.045 km^{2})
  - Land: 6.581 sq mi (17.045 km^{2})
  - Water: 0 sq mi (0 km^{2}) 0%
- Elevation: 256 ft (78 m)

Population (2020)
  - Total: 25,718
  - Density: 3,907.9/sq mi (1,508.8/km^{2})
- Time zone: UTC-8 (PST)
  - Summer (DST): UTC-7 (PDT)
- ZIP code: 92705, 92780
- Area code: 714
- FIPS code: 06-52379
- GNIS feature IDs: 1867065, 2408951

North Tustin is an unincorporated community in Orange County, California, United States. The population was 25,718 at the 2020 census, up from 24,917 in 2010. For statistical purposes, the United States Census Bureau has defined North Tustin as a census-designated place (CDP). It is both the largest CDP and largest unincorporated community in Orange County. The CDP's name was changed from Tustin Foothills in 2005. Located outside the city limits of Tustin, North Tustin is served by 92705 and 92780 ZIP Codes.

== Geography ==
According to the United States Census Bureau, the CDP has a total area of 6.6 square miles (17 km^{2}), all land.

North Tustin is bordered by the city of Tustin to the south, east, and west, and by the city of Orange to the north.

=== Communities ===
Within North Tustin are the distinct unincorporated communities of Cowan Heights, East Tustin, Lemon Heights, North Tustin, Panorama Heights, and Red Hill. While there is no local government authority, some social and community services are provided by The Foothill Communities Association (FCA), a nonprofit corporation begun in the 1960s to preserve the living environment in those communities. FCA also advocates for or against some development projects within the North Tustin area depending on the impact on the community.

== Demographics ==
Historical population
Census	Pop.	Note	%±
1970	26,598		—
1980	26,174		−1.6%
1990	24,358		−6.9%
2000	24,044		−1.3%
2010	24,917		3.6%
2020	25,718		3.2%
U.S. Decennial Census; 1860–1870 1880-1890; 1900 1910 1920; 1930 1940 1950; 1960 1970 1980; 1990 2000 2010; 2020

North Tustin first appeared as an unincorporated community in the 1970 U.S. census under the name Tustin Foothills; and designated as a census designated place in the 1980 United States census. The name was changed to North Tustin for the 2010 U.S. census.

=== Racial and ethnic composition ===
North Tustin CDP, California – Racial and ethnic composition Note: the US Census treats Hispanic/Latino as an ethnic category. This table excludes Latinos from the racial categories and assigns them to a separate category. Hispanics/Latinos may be of any race.
Race / Ethnicity (NH = Non-Hispanic)	Pop 1980	Pop 1990	Pop 2000	Pop 2010	Pop 2020	% 1980	% 1990	% 2000	% 2010	% 2020	
White alone (NH)	24,261	21,210	19,608	18,784	16,478	92.69%	87.08%	81.55%	75.39%	64.07%	
Black or African American alone (NH)	59	122	121	138	163	0.23%	0.50%	0.50%	0.55%	0.63%	
Native American or Alaska Native alone (NH)	52	48	52	58	27	0.20%	0.20%	0.22%	0.23%	0.10%	
Asian alone (NH)	650	1,459	1,677	1,975	2,956	2.48%	5.99%	6.97%	7.93%	11.49%	
Native Hawaiian or Pacific Islander alone (NH)	650	1,459	31	47	47	2.48%	5.99%	38	0.13%	0.19%	0.15%
Other race alone (NH)	22	13	51	55	109	0.08%	0.05%	0.21%	0.22%	0.42%	
Mixed race or Multiracial (NH)	x	x	467	600	1,467	x	x	1.94%	2.41%	5.70%	
Hispanic or Latino (any race)	1,130	1,506	2,037	3,260	4,480	4.31%	6.18%	8.47%	13.08%	17.42%	
Total	26,174	24,358	24,044	24,917	25,718	100.00%	100.00%	100.00%	100.00%	100.00%	

=== 2020 census ===
As of the 2020 census, North Tustin had a population of 25,718 and a population density of 3,907.9 inhabitants per square mile (1,508.8/km^{2}). All residents lived in urban areas, with none in rural areas.

Racial composition as of the 2020 census
Race	Number	Percent
White	17,453	67.9%
Black or African American	181	0.7%
American Indian and Alaska Native	114	0.4%
Asian	2,996	11.6%
Native Hawaiian and Other Pacific Islander	42	0.2%
Some other race	1,331	5.2%
Two or more races	3,601	14.0%
Hispanic or Latino (of any race)	4,480	17.4%

The age distribution was 21.5% under the age of 18, 8.1% aged 18 to 24, 18.5% aged 25 to 44, 30.6% aged 45 to 64, and 21.4% who were 65 years of age or older; the median age was 46.7 years. For every 100 females, there were 97.3 males, and for every 100 females age 18 and over, there were 94.6 males.

There were 8,641 households, of which 34.0% had children under the age of 18 living in them. Of all households, 68.5% were married-couple households, 3.1% were cohabiting couple households, 10.3% had a male householder with no spouse or partner present, and 18.1% had a female householder with no spouse or partner present; 14.2% were made up of individuals and 9.4% had someone living alone who was 65 years of age or older. The average household size was 2.96, and there were 7,111 families (82.3% of households).

Overall, 99.6% of residents lived in households, 0.3% lived in non-institutionalized group quarters, and 0.2% were institutionalized.

There were 8,911 housing units at an average density of 1,354.0 units per square mile (522.8 units/km^{2}), of which 8,641 (97.0%) were occupied. Of the occupied units, 88.3% were owner-occupied and 11.7% were rented, with a homeowner vacancy rate of 0.7% and a rental vacancy rate of 2.5%; overall, 3.0% of housing units were vacant.

=== 2010 census ===
The 2010 United States census reported that North Tustin had a population of 24,917. The population density was 3,733.7 inhabitants per square mile (1,441.6/km^{2}). The racial makeup of North Tustin was 20,836 (83.6%) White (75.4% Non-Hispanic White), 148 (0.6%) African American, 104 (0.4%) Native American, 1,994 (8.0%) Asian, 52 (0.2%) Pacific Islander, 908 (3.6%) from other races, and 875 (3.5%) from two or more races. Hispanic or Latino of any race were 3,260 persons (13.1%).

The Census reported that 24,726 people (99.2% of the population) lived in households, 161 (0.6%) lived in non-institutionalized group quarters, and 30 (0.1%) were institutionalized.

There were 8,580 households, out of which 3,036 (35.4%) had children under the age of 18 living in them, 5,971 (69.6%) were opposite-sex married couples living together, 685 (8.0%) had a female householder with no husband present, 310 (3.6%) had a male householder with no wife present. There were 200 (2.3%) unmarried opposite-sex partnerships, and 69 (0.8%) same-sex married couples or partnerships. 1,276 households (14.9%) were made up of individuals, and 764 (8.9%) had someone living alone who was 65 years of age or older. The average household size was 2.88. There were 6,966 families (81.2% of all households); the average family size was 3.19.

The population was spread out, with 5,857 people (23.5%) under the age of 18, 1,709 people (6.9%) aged 18 to 24, 4,613 people (18.5%) aged 25 to 44, 7,979 people (32.0%) aged 45 to 64, and 4,759 people (19.1%) who were 65 years of age or older. The median age was 45.6 years. For every 100 females, there were 96.3 males. For every 100 females age 18 and over, there were 94.0 males.

There were 8,866 housing units at an average density of 1,328.5 per square mile (512.9/km^{2}), of which 7,676 (89.5%) were owner-occupied, and 904 (10.5%) were occupied by renters. The homeowner vacancy rate was 0.9%; the rental vacancy rate was 3.4%. 22,095 people (88.7% of the population) lived in owner-occupied housing units and 2,631 people (10.6%) lived in rental housing units.

According to the 2010 United States Census, North Tustin had a median household income of $119,207, with 3.0% of the population living below the federal poverty line.

=== Income ===
In 2023, the US Census Bureau estimated that the median household income was $186,250, and the per capita income was $88,003. About 3.1% of families and 4.5% of the population were below the poverty line.

== Government ==
In the California State Legislature, North Tustin is in the 37th senatorial district, represented by Republican Steven Choi, and in the 59th Assembly district, represented by Republican Phillip Chen.

In the United States House of Representatives, North Tustin is in California's 40th congressional district, represented by Republican Young Kim.

== Education ==
Primary and secondary education is overseen by the Tustin Unified School District, which also serves the incorporated City of Tustin. It has one of the highest accelerated learning percentages in the US.

Orange Unified School District, which also serves the incorporated City of Orange, CA, serves Unincorporated North Tustin in the Panorama Heights and Crawford Canyon neighborhoods North of Fairhaven Extension.

== Notable people ==
- Derrek Chan (b. 1998) – soccer player
- Kevin Daft (b. 1975) – National Football League (NFL) player and college football coach
- Sam Dungan (1866–1939) – Major League Baseball (MLB) player
- Tiffany Haas (b. 1983) – softball player
- Phil Hughes (b. 1986) – MLB player
- Adam Koets (b. 1984) – NFL player
- Matthew Lillard (b. 1970) – actor
- Caitlin Lowe (b. 1985) – softball player and coach who represented Team USA at the 2008 Olympic games

== See also ==
- Santa Ana, California
- Tustin, California
