= Irvine, California =

City in Orange County, California, US

- Charter city
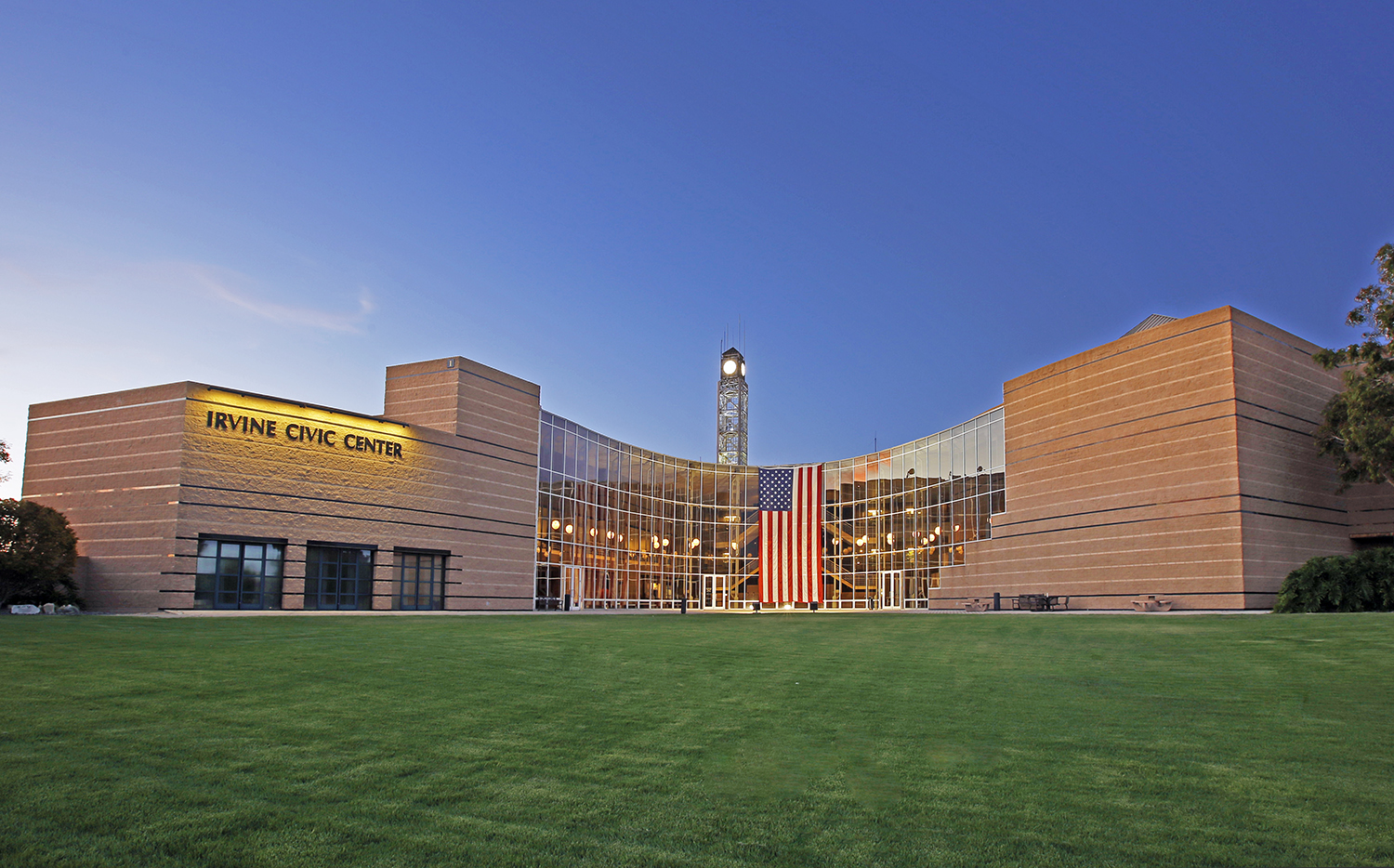
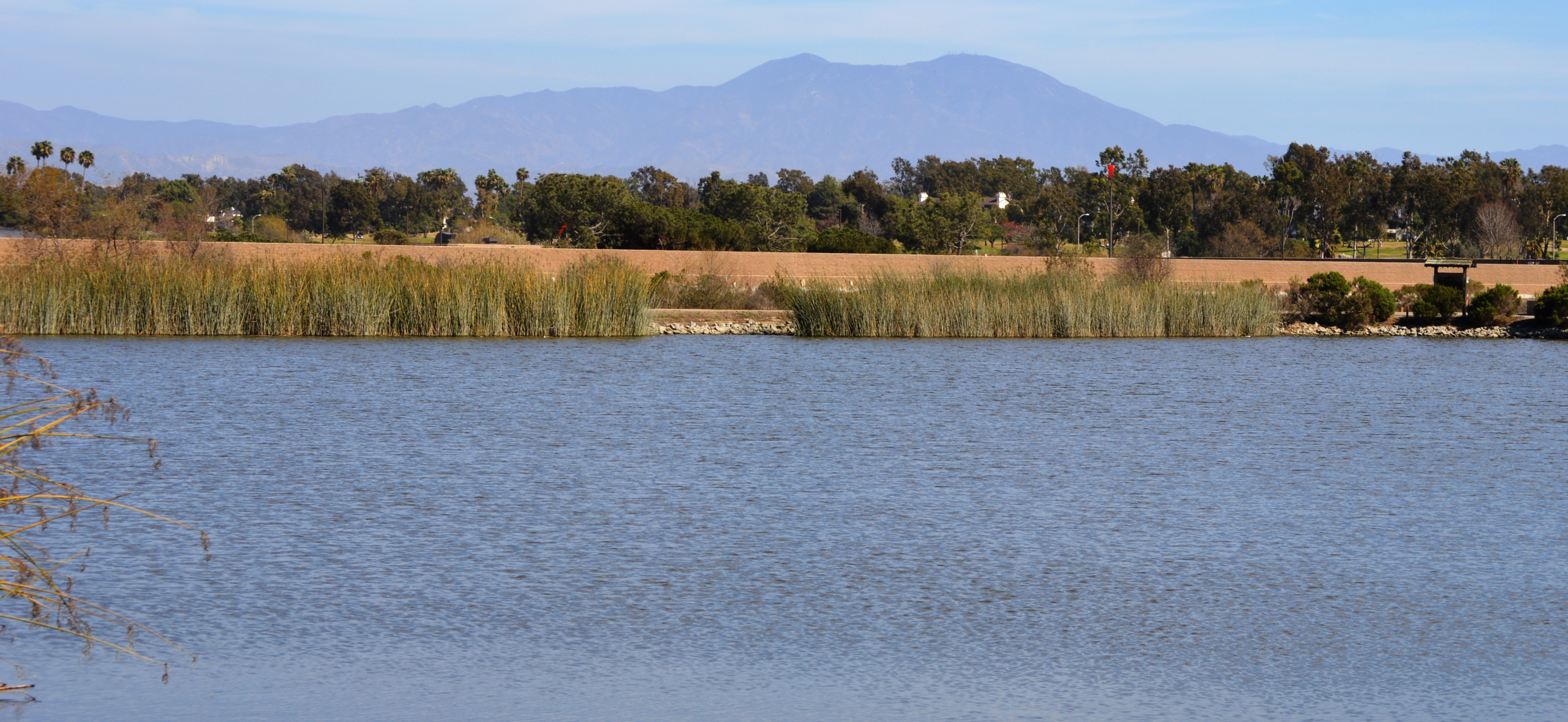
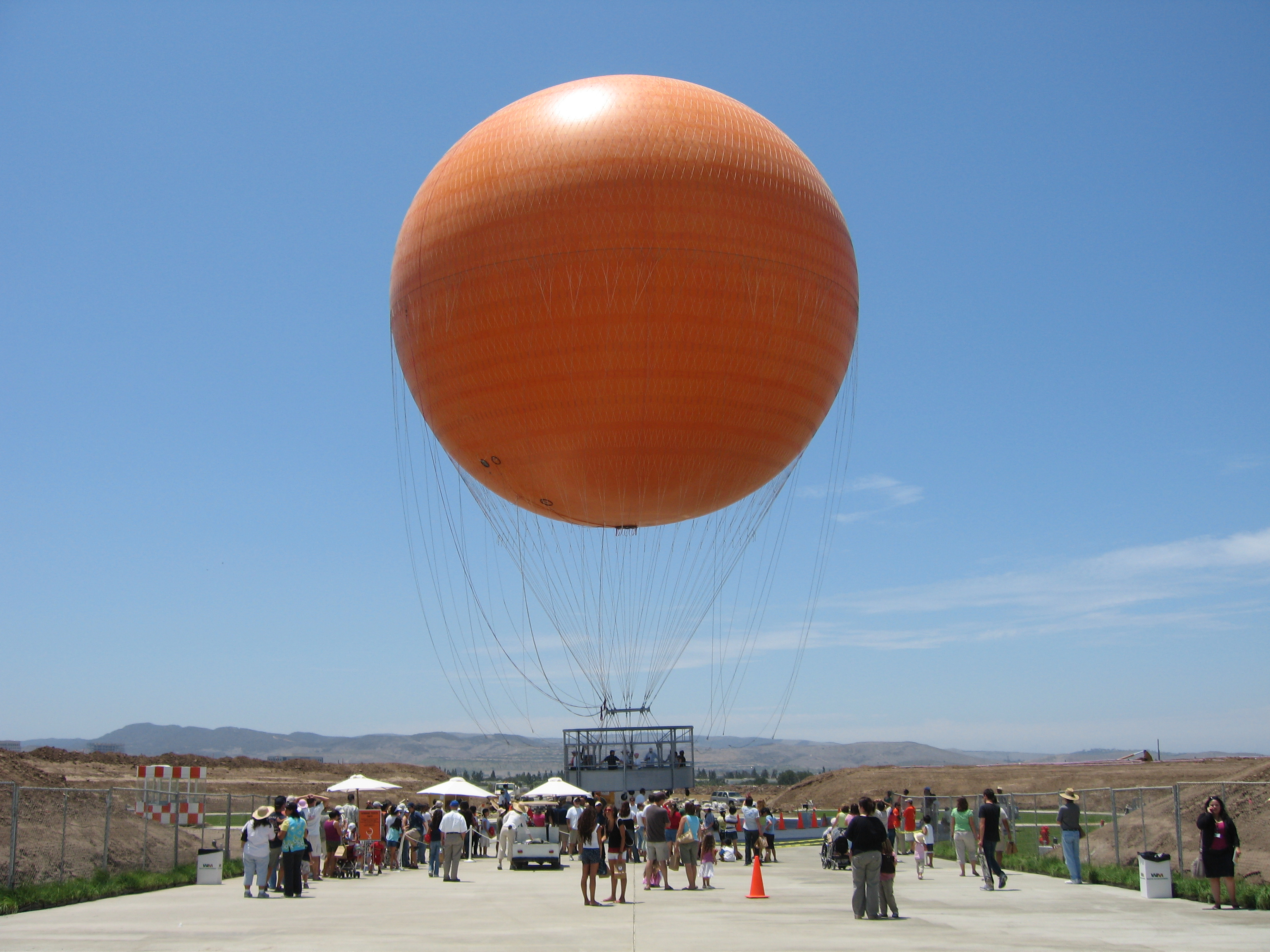
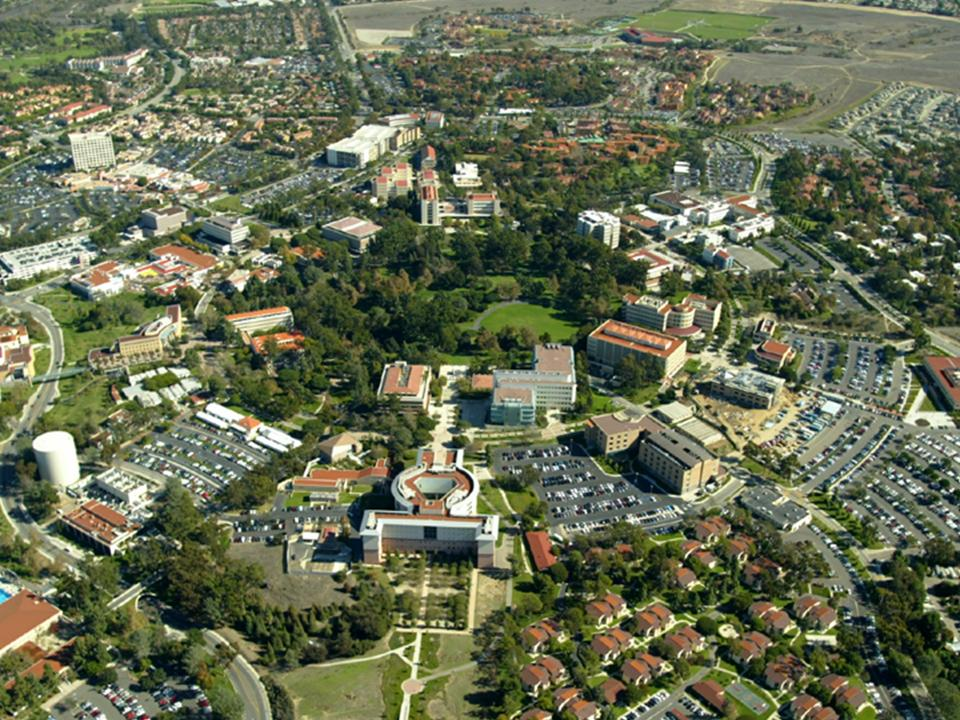
- Irvine Civic Center San Joaquin Wildlife Sanctuary Balloon ride at Orange County Great Park University of California, Irvine

- Flag Seal
- Interactive map of Irvine, California
- Location within California Location within the United States
- Coordinates: 33°40′10″N 117°49′23″W
- Country: United States
- State: California
- County: Orange
- Incorporated: December 28, 1971
- Named for: James Irvine

Government
  - Type: Council–manager
  - Body: Irvine City Council
  - Mayor: Larry Agran (D)
  - Vice mayor: James Mai (R)
  - Interim city manager: Sean Joyce

Area
  - Total: 65.92 sq mi (170.74 km^{2})
  - Land: 65.61 sq mi (169.94 km^{2})
  - Water: 0.31 sq mi (0.80 km^{2}) 0.52%
- Elevation: 56 ft (17 m)

Population (2020)
  - Total: 307,670
  - Estimate (2025): 318,764 ▲
  - Rank: (2025); 2nd in Orange County; 12th in California; 63rd in the United States
  - Density: 4,689.1/sq mi (1,810.46/km^{2})
- Time zone: UTC−08:00 (Pacific)
  - Summer (DST): UTC−07:00 (PDT)
- ZIP Codes: 92602–92604, 92606, 92612, 92614, 92616, 92618, 92620, 92623, 92650, 92697
- Area codes: 949, 657/714 (some parts)
- FIPS code: 06-36770
- GNIS feature IDs: 1660804, 2410116
- Sphere of influence: 74 miles (119 km)
- Website: cityofirvine.gov
- Symbols of Irvine
- Flower: Lily of the Nile
- Insect: Western Swallowtail Butterfly
- Tree: Camphor
- Vegetable: Asparagus

Irvine (/ˈɜːrvaɪn/ UR-vyne) is a planned city in central Orange County, California, United States, in the Los Angeles metropolitan area. It was first named Myford in 1888 and renamed Irvine in 1914 for the landowner James Irvine. The Irvine Company started developing the area in the 1960s. The city was formally incorporated on December 28, 1971. The 66-square-mile (170 km^{2}) city had a population of 318,629 as of June 2025. As of 2025, it is the second most populous city in Orange County, fifth in the Greater Los Angeles region, and 63rd in the United States.

Several major corporations in the technology and semiconductor sectors maintain their headquarters in Irvine. Irvine is also home to several higher-education institutions including the University of California, Irvine (UCI), Concordia University, Irvine Valley College, and campuses of the University of La Verne and Pepperdine University.

== History ==
=== Kizh era ===
The Kizh (Tongva) people (also known as Gabrieleño) inhabited the Irvine area for thousands of years prior to European contact. In the present, the city and the schools within are taking action to educate the community about the indigenous history. In 2024 there was a proposal to create a village based on Putuidem Village located in San Juan Capistrano. UCI set a Land Acknowledgement to inform the history of the land their campus is based on as well as many other immigrant groups that had also lived on that land.

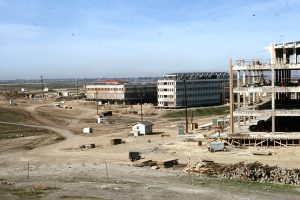
Early UCI under construction 1965.

=== Spanish era ===
Gaspar de Portolá, a Spanish explorer, came to the area in 1769, which led to the establishment of forts, missions and cattle herds. The King of Spain parceled out land for missions and private use.

=== Mexican era ===
After Mexico's independence from Spain in 1821, the Mexican Congress passed the Mexican secularization act of 1833 which secularized the missions and resulted in the Mexican government assuming control of the lands of said missions. It began distributing the land to Mexican citizens who applied for grants. Three large Spanish/Mexican land grants, also known as ranchos, made up the land that later became the Irvine Ranch: Rancho Santiago de Santa Ana, Rancho San Joaquín and Rancho Lomas de Santiago.

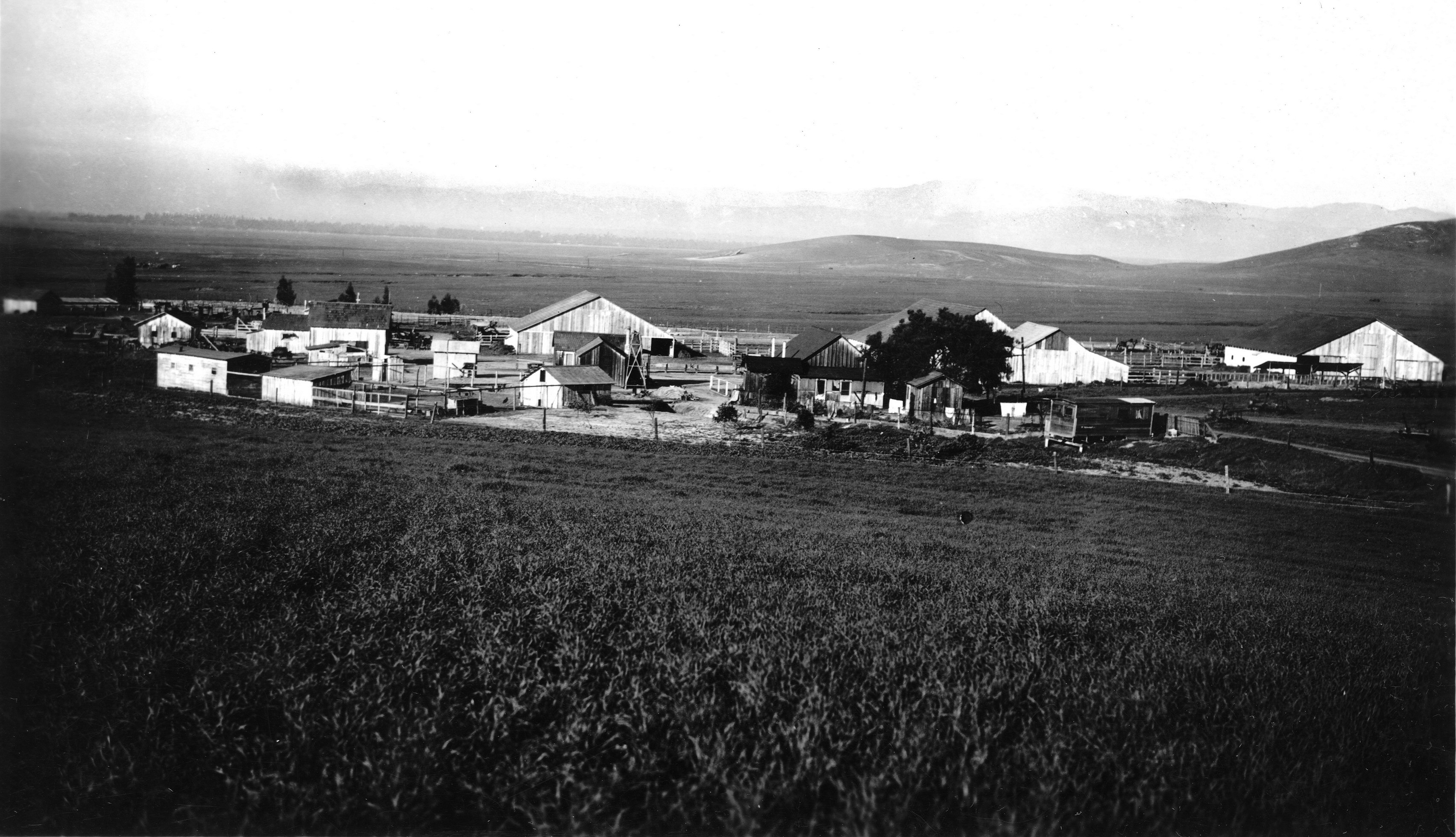
Camp Bonita at Irvine Ranch in 1937

=== 19th century ===
In 1864, José Andrés Sepúlveda, owner of Rancho San Joaquín, sold 50,000 acres (200 km^{2}) to Benjamin and Thomas Flint, Llewellyn Bixby, and James Irvine for $18,000 to resolve debts due to the Great Drought. In 1866, Irvine, Flint and Bixby acquired 47,000-acre (190 km^{2}) Rancho Lomas de Santiago for $7,000. After the Mexican-American War the land of Rancho Santiago de Santa Ana fell prey to tangled titles. In 1868, the ranch was divided among three claimants as part of a lawsuit: Flint, Bixby and Irvine. The ranches were devoted to sheep grazing. However, in 1870, tenant farming was permitted.

In 1878, James Irvine acquired his partners' interests for $150,000 ($5,004,310 in 2025 dollars). His 110,000 acres (450 km^{2}) stretched 23 miles (37 km) from the Pacific Ocean to the Santa Ana River. James Irvine died in 1886. The ranch was inherited by his son, James Irvine II, who incorporated it into the Irvine Company. James Irvine II shifted the ranch operations to field crops, olive and citrus crops.

In 1888, the Santa Fe Railroad extended its line to Fallbrook Junction, north of San Diego, establishing a station and naming it in honor of James Irvine. The town that formed around this station was named Myford, after Irvine's son, because a post office in Calaveras County already bore the family name. The town was renamed Irvine in 1914.

From Orange County Miscellaneous Maps, book 1, page 88. Orange County Archives

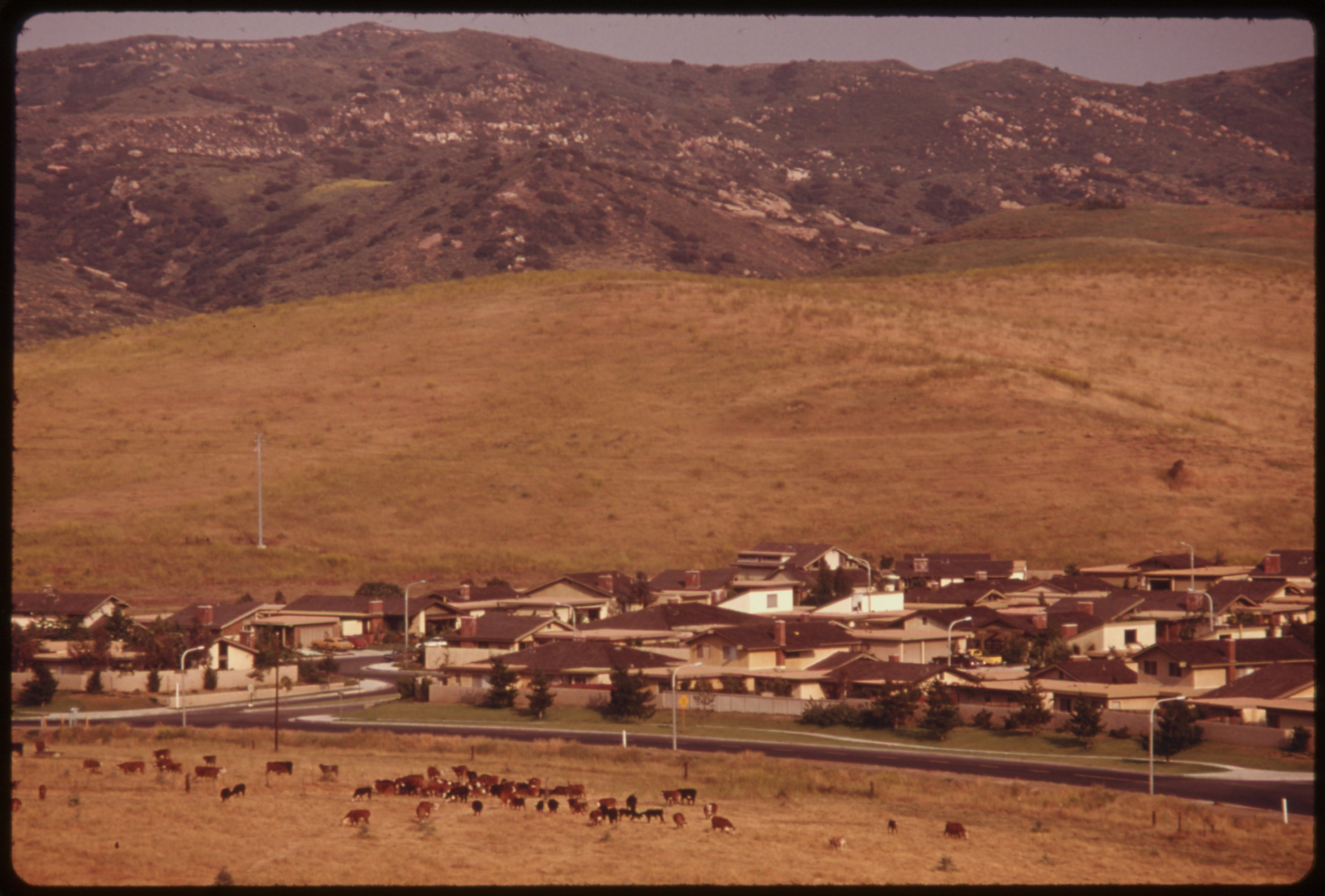
Suburban development in Irvine Ranch in 1975

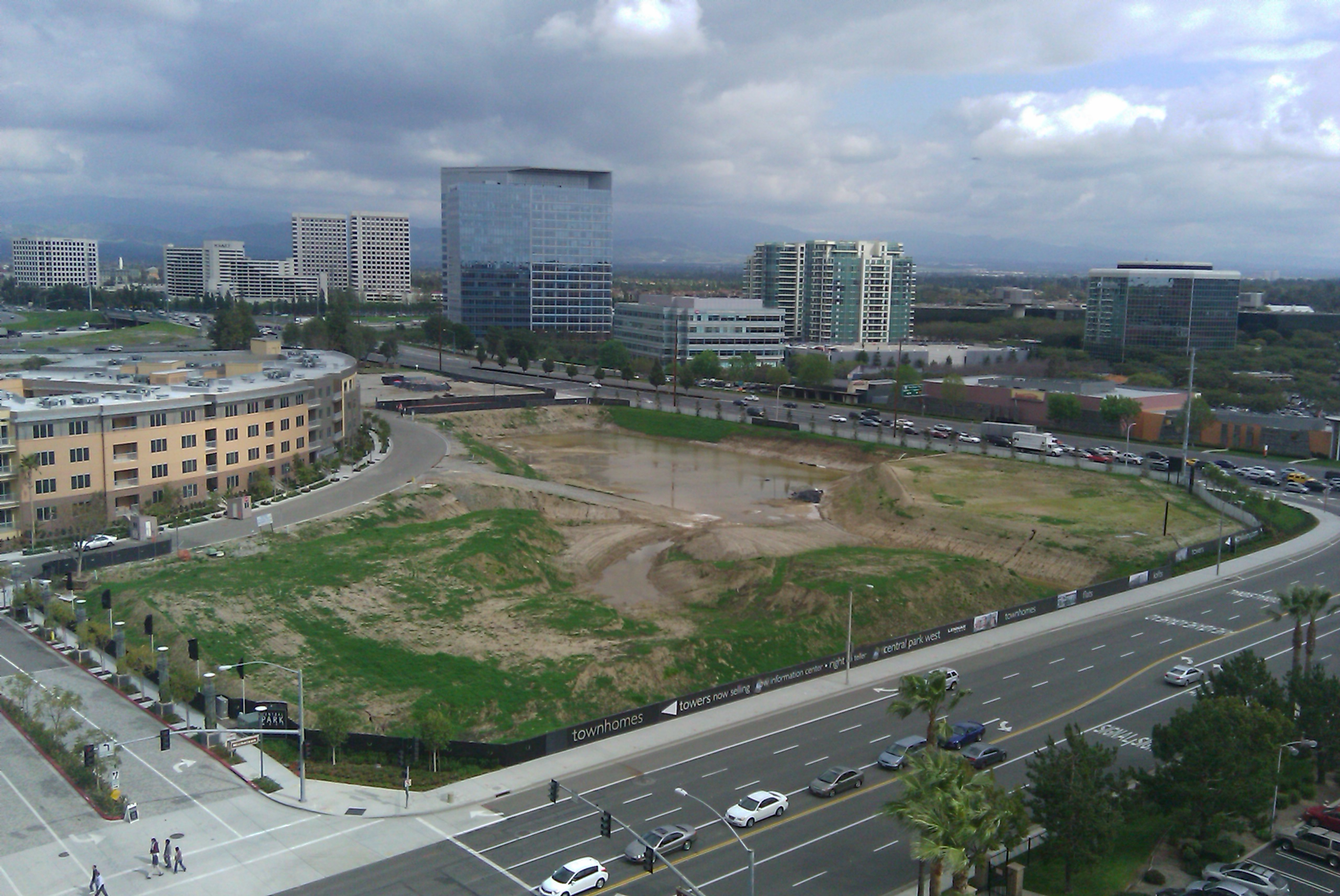
The developing urban core in the city of Irvine in 2010

=== 20th century ===
By 1918, 60,000 acres (240 km^{2}) of lima beans were grown on the Irvine Ranch. Two Marine Corps facilities, MCAS El Toro and MCAS Tustin, were built during World War II on ranch land sold to the government.

James Irvine II died in 1947 at age 80. His son, Myford, assumed the presidency of the Irvine Company. He began opening small sections of the Irvine Ranch to urban development.

The Irvine Ranch played host to the Boy Scouts of America's 1953 National Scout Jamboree. Jamboree Road, a major street which now stretches from Newport Beach to the city of Orange, was named in honor of this event. David Sills, then a young Boy Scout from Peoria, Illinois, was among the attendees at the 1953 Jamboree. Sills came back to Irvine as an adult and went on to serve four terms as the city's mayor.

Myford Irvine died in 1959. The same year, the University of California asked the Irvine Company for 1,000 acres (4 km^{2}) for a new university campus. The Irvine Company sold the land and later the state purchased an additional 500 acres (2.0 km^{2}).

William Pereira, the university's consulting architect, and the Irvine Company planners drew up master plans for a city of 50,000 people surrounding the new university. The plan called for industrial, residential and recreational areas, commercial centers and greenbelts. The new community was to be named Irvine; the old agricultural town of Irvine, where the railroad station and post office were located, was renamed East Irvine. The first phases of the villages of Turtle Rock, University Park, Westpark (then called Culverdale), El Camino Real, and Walnut were completed by 1970.

On December 28, 1971, the residents of these communities voted to incorporate a substantially larger city than the one envisioned by the Pereira plan. By January 1999, Irvine had a population of 134,000 and a total area of 43 square miles (111 km^{2}).

=== 21st century ===
In late 2003, after a ten-year-long legal battle, Irvine annexed the former El Toro Marine Corps Air Station. This added 7.3 square miles (19 km^{2}) of land to the city and blocked an initiative championed by Newport Beach residents to replace John Wayne Airport with a new airport at El Toro. The Orange County Great Park was developed there.

== Geography ==
Irvine borders Tustin to the north, Santa Ana to the northwest, Lake Forest to the east and southeast, Laguna Hills and Laguna Woods to the south, Costa Mesa to the west, and Newport Beach to the southwest. Irvine also shares a small border with Orange to the north on open lands by the SR 261.

San Diego Creek, which flows northwest into Upper Newport Bay, is the primary watercourse draining the city. Its largest tributary is Peters Canyon Wash. Most of Irvine is in a broad, flat valley between Loma Ridge in the north and San Joaquin Hills in the south. In the extreme northern and southern areas, however, are several hills, plateaus and canyons.

=== Planned city ===
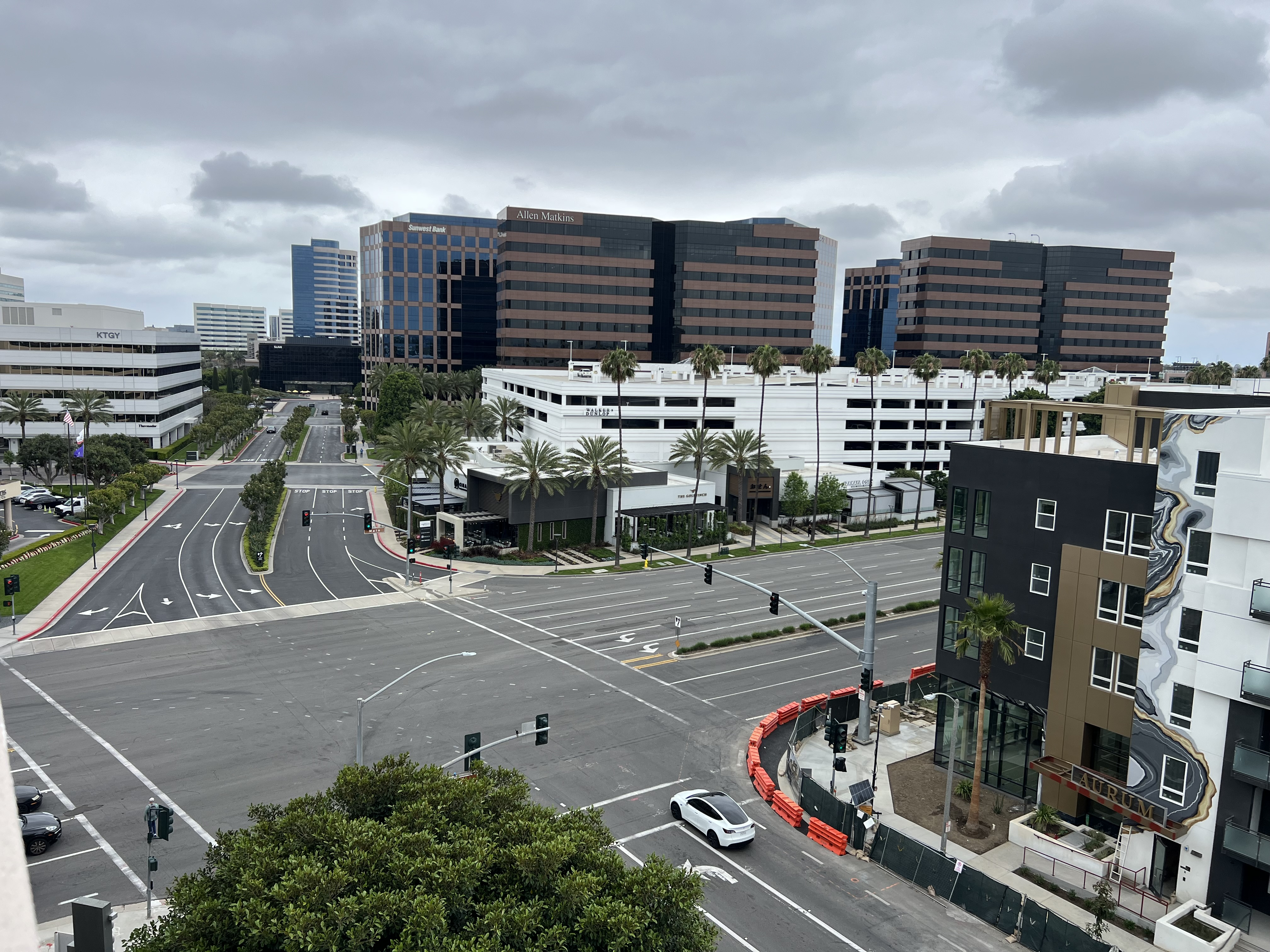
A view of the Irvine Business Complex

Los Angeles architect William Pereira and Irvine Company employee Raymond Watson designed Irvine's layout beginning in the late 1950s, which is nominally divided into townships called "villages", separated by six-lane arterial roads. Each township contains houses of similar design, along with commercial centers, religious institutions, and schools. Commercial districts are checker-boarded in a periphery around the central townships. Only automobile transportation was planned for, with other forms of transportation ignored, resulting in Irvine becoming extremely car dependent today.

Pereira originally envisioned the university campus at the northern end of the Irvine Ranch. When the Irvine Company refused to relinquish valuable farmland in the flat central region of the ranch for this plan, the university site was moved to the base of the southern coastal hills. The city layout was based on the shape of a necklace (with the villages strung along two parallel main streets, which terminate at University of California, Irvine (UCI), the "pendant"). Residential areas are now bordered by two commercial districts, the Irvine Business Complex to the west (part of the South Coast Plaza–John Wayne Airport edge city) and Irvine Spectrum to the east.

The planning areas of Irvine

All streets have landscaping allowances. Rights-of-way for powerlines also serve as bicycle corridors, parks, and greenbelts to tie together ecological preserves. The city irrigates the greenery with reclaimed water. The homeowners' associations which govern some village neighborhoods exercise varying degrees of control on the appearances of homes. In more restrictive areas, houses' roofing, paint colors, and landscaping are regulated. Older parts of the Village of Northwood that were developed beginning in the early 1970s independently of the Irvine Company and does not have homeowners' associations.The more tightly regulated villages generally offer more amenities, such as members-only swimming pools, tennis courts and parks.

Homeowners in villages developed in the 1980s and later may be levied a Mello-Roos special tax, which came about in the post-Proposition 13 era.

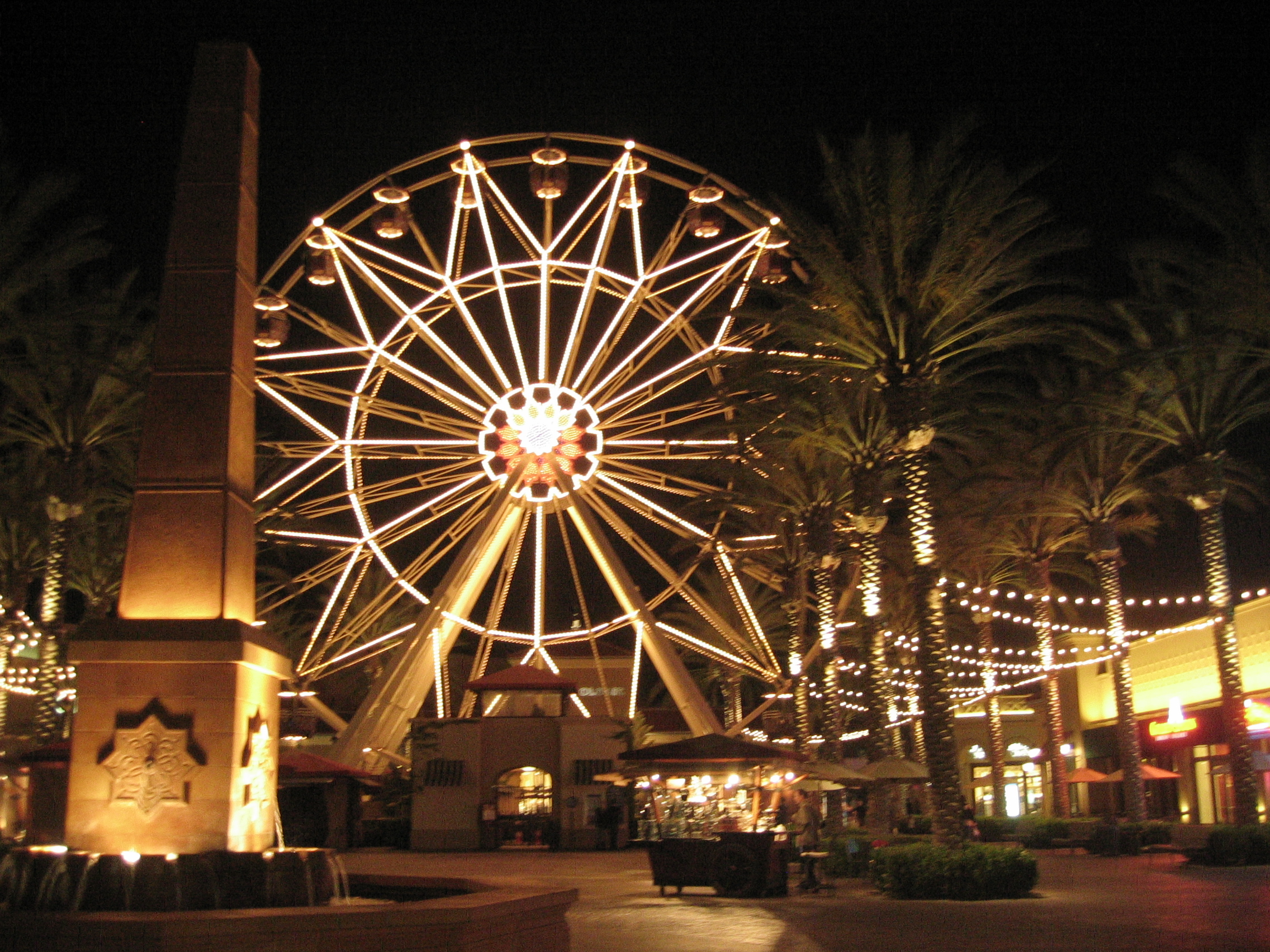
Rue Rueda Gigante Square in Irvine Spectrum

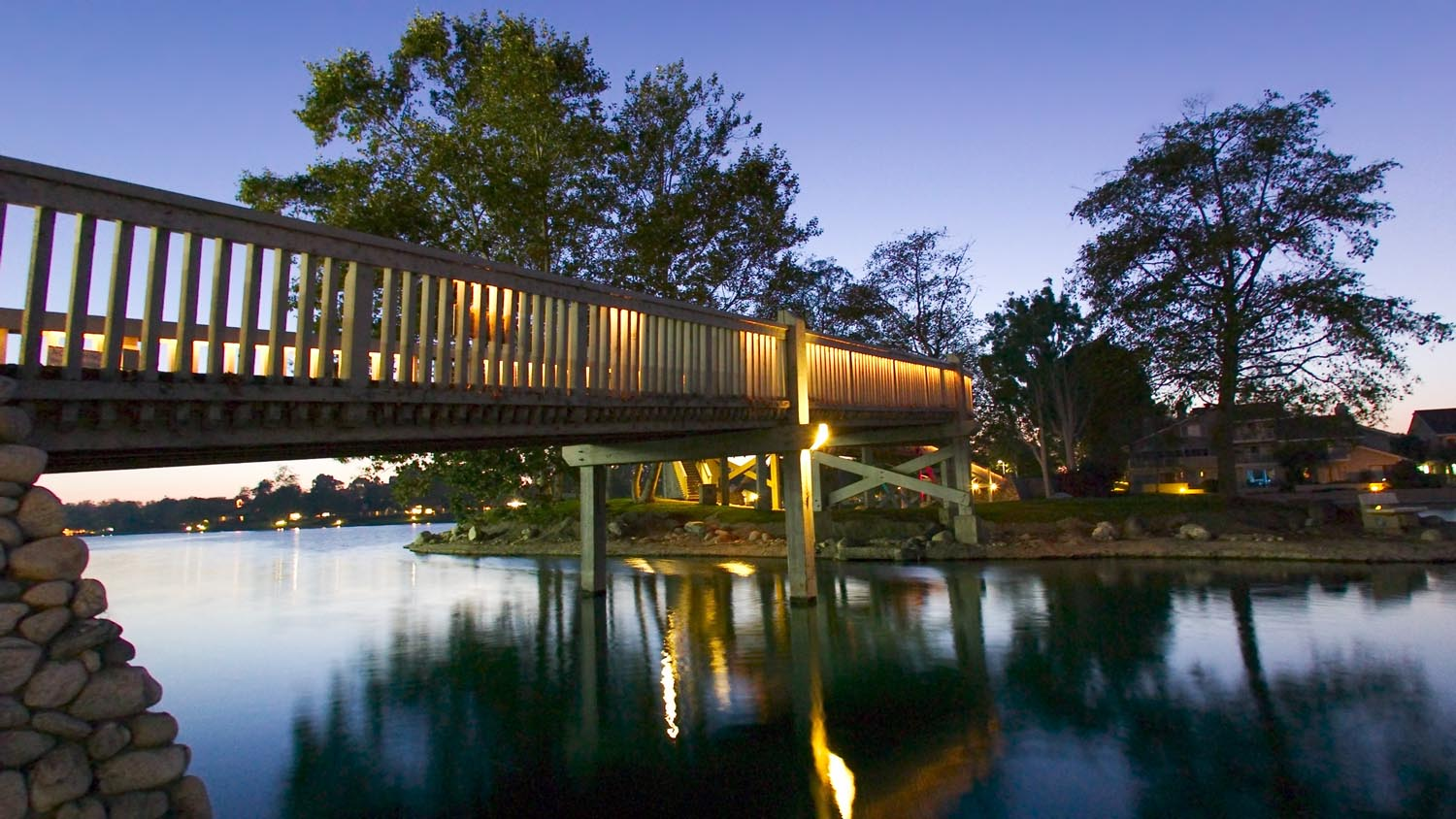
A bridge over the artificial North Lake in Woodbridge, an Atlantic-style neighborhood

==== Villages ====
Each of the villages was initially planned to have a distinct architectural theme.

- El Camino Glen
- College Park
- The Colony
- Columbus Grove
- Cypress Village
- Deerfield (mixed styles)
- East Irvine
- El Camino Real (Spanish/Neo-Eclectic)
- Greentree
- Irvine Groves
- Harvard Square
- Heritage Fields
- Laguna Altura
- Lambert Ranch
- Northpark (French Country, Formal French, Italian Country, Formal Italian, Monterey and Spanish Colonial)
- Northpark Square (Spanish Mission)
- Northwood (Bungalow, Craftsman)
- Oak Creek (mixed styles)
- Old Towne Irvine
- Orangetree
- Orchard Hills (Rural Craftsman/Spanish/Tuscan)
- Park Lane
- Parkcrest
- Parkside
- Pavilion Park
- Portola Springs (Spanish/Tuscan)
- Planning Area 40 (Future Village)
- Quail Hill (Spanish/Tuscan)
- Racquet Club
- The Ranch
- Rancho San Joaquin (Shed style)
- Rosegate (Spanish/Tuscan)
- San Marino (Spanish/Tuscan)
- Stonegate (Spanish)
- Shady Canyon (Tuscan Ranch)
- Turtle Ridge (Tuscan)
- Turtle Rock (mixed styles)
- University Hills
- University Park (California Modern)
- University Town Center (mixed styles)
- Walnut (Prairie Style)
- West Irvine (California Modern)
- Westpark (Italian Riviera/Mediterranean)
- The Willows (Note: Constructed by Levitt and Sons of California, Inc.)
- Windwood
- Woodbridge (Atlantic Coast)
- Woodbury (Tuscan/Spanish/French)
- Woodbury East (Spanish)

Business and commercial areas

- Irvine Business Complex
- Irvine Spectrum (Contemporary/Moroccan)
- Old Town Irvine

=== Climate ===
Irvine

Climate chart (precipitation, max. and min. temperature)
J	F	M	A	M	J	J	A	S	O	N	D
2.7 69 49	3.5 71 48	1.7 73 50	0.9 76 52	0.3 79 56	0 83 59	0.1 88 62	0 90 62	0.1 89 62	0.6 84 58	0.8 76 53	2.3 68 48
- █ Average max. and min. temperatures in °F
- █ Precipitation totals in inches
- Source: NOAA
Metric conversion
J	F	M	A	M	J	J	A	S	O	N	D
68 21 9	88 21 9	43 23 10	22 25 11	8.6 26 13	1 28 15	2.3 31 17	0.3 32 17	2.5 32 17	16 29 14	21 24 11	59 20 9
- █ Average max. and min. temperatures in °C
- █ Precipitation totals in mm

Late spring and early summer in Irvine is subject to the June Gloom phenomenon widespread in southern California, with overcast mornings and occasional drizzle. Late summer and fall are warm and mostly dry, with occasional bouts of humid weather extending from Pacific hurricanes off the west coast of Mexico. Winters are mild, with most winters having no frost, and can be hot and dry when the Santa Ana winds blow. Irvine has a Mediterranean climate wherein precipitation occurs predominantly during the winter months. Because Irvine is close to the coast, different parts of Irvine have different microclimates; for instance, the June Gloom effect is stronger in the southern parts of Irvine, closer to the Pacific Ocean.

It can occasionally snow in the Santa Ana Mountains to the northeast of Irvine. Snow within the lower-lying parts of Irvine is very rare, but the area received three inches of snow in January 1949. A tornado touched down in Irvine in 1991, an event that happens in Orange County more generally approximately once every five years.

Climate data for Irvine Ranch, Irvine, California (1991–2020 normals)
Month	Jan	Feb	Mar	Apr	May	Jun	Jul	Aug	Sep	Oct	Nov	Dec	Year
Record high °F (°C)	94 (34)	92 (33)	98 (37)	106 (41)	105 (41)	109 (43)	109 (43)	110 (43)	111 (44)	108 (42)	105 (41)	97 (36)	111 (44)
Mean daily maximum °F (°C)	69.0 (20.6)	70.5 (21.4)	73.1 (22.8)	76.4 (24.7)	79.4 (26.3)	82.5 (28.1)	88.1 (31.2)	90.2 (32.3)	88.8 (31.6)	84.2 (29.0)	75.6 (24.2)	67.8 (19.9)	78.8 (26.0)
Daily mean °F (°C)	58.8 (14.9)	59.2 (15.1)	61.4 (16.3)	64.1 (17.8)	67.6 (19.8)	70.6 (21.4)	75.0 (23.9)	76.2 (24.6)	75.3 (24.1)	71.1 (21.7)	64.0 (17.8)	57.7 (14.3)	66.7 (19.3)
Mean daily minimum °F (°C)	48.6 (9.2)	47.9 (8.8)	49.7 (9.8)	51.9 (11.1)	55.5 (13.1)	58.7 (14.8)	61.9 (16.6)	62.2 (16.8)	61.7 (16.5)	57.8 (14.3)	52.5 (11.4)	47.6 (8.7)	54.7 (12.6)
Record low °F (°C)	18 (−8)	25 (−4)	26 (−3)	31 (−1)	34 (1)	40 (4)	44 (7)	43 (6)	39 (4)	29 (−2)	25 (−4)	24 (−4)	18 (−8)
Average rainfall inches (mm)	2.67 (68)	3.47 (88)	1.70 (43)	0.85 (22)	0.34 (8.6)	0.04 (1.0)	0.09 (2.3)	0.01 (0.25)	0.10 (2.5)	0.62 (16)	0.83 (21)	2.34 (59)	13.06 (331.65)
Average rainy days (≥ 0.01 in)	4.1	4.1	3.0	2.2	1.6	0.2	0.3	0.1	0.4	1.9	2.4	4.2	24.5
Source: NOAA

== Demographics ==
Historical population
Census	Pop.	Note	%±
1970	7,381		—
1980	62,134		741.8%
1990	110,330		77.6%
2000	143,072		29.7%
2010	212,375		48.4%
2020	307,670		44.9%
2025 (est.)	318,764	▲	3.6%
U.S. Decennial Census; 1860–1870 1880-1890; 1900 1910 1920; 1930 1940 1950; 1960 1970 1980; 1990 2000 2010; 2020

Irvine first appeared in the 1970 United States census with a population of 7,381. It appeared as a city in the 1980 United States census.

Historical racial profile	1980	1990	2000	2010	2020	2024
White	87.8%	77.9%	61.1%	50.5%	37.7%	40.1%
—Non-Hispanic	84.5%	73.9%	57%	45.1%	34.5%	34.8%
Black or African American	1.5%	1.8%	1.5%	1.8%	2.2%	2.9%
Hispanic or Latino (of any race)	5.8%	6.3%	7.4%	9.2%	11.7%	18.8%
Asian	7.8%	18.1%	29.8%	39.2%	45.4%	39.8%
Two or more races	n/a	n/a	5.4%	5.5%	9.7%	10.8%

Irvine, California – Racial and ethnic composition Note: the US Census treats Hispanic/Latino as an ethnic category. This table excludes Latinos from the racial categories and assigns them to a separate category. Hispanics/Latinos may be of any race.
Race / Ethnicity (NH = Non-Hispanic)	Pop 1980	Pop 1990	Pop 2000	Pop 2010	Pop 2020	% 1980	% 1990	% 2000	% 2010	% 2020
White alone (NH)	52,508	81,493	81,613	95,822	106,056	84.51%	73.86%	57.04%	45.12%	34.47%
Black or African American alone (NH)	981	1,912	1,977	3,494	6,646	1.58%	1.73%	1.38%	1.65%	2.16%
Native American or Alaska Native alone (NH)	161	206	162	199	285	0.26%	0.19%	0.11%	0.09%	0.09%
Asian alone (NH)	4,770	19,701	42,506	82,722	139,725	7.68%	17.86%	29.71%	38.95%	45.41%
Native Hawaiian or Pacific Islander alone (NH)	4,770	19,701	180	295	341	7.68%	17.86%	0.13%	0.14%	0.11%
Other race alone (NH)	141	126	359	554	1,790	0.23%	0.11%	0.25%	0.26%	0.58%
Mixed race or Multiracial (NH)	x	x	5,736	9,668	16,972	x	x	4.01%	4.55%	5.52%
Hispanic or Latino (any race)	3,573	6,902	10,539	19,621	35,855	5.75%	6.26%	7.37%	9.24%	11.65%
Total	62,134	110,330	143,072	212,375	307,670	100.00%	100.00%	100.00%	100.00%	100.00%

=== 2020 ===
The 2020 United States census reported that Irvine had a population of 307,670. The population density was 4,689.4 inhabitants per square mile (1,810.6/km^{2}). The racial makeup of Irvine was 37.7% White, 2.2% African American, 0.3% Native American, 45.4% Asian, 0.1% Pacific Islander, 4.6% from other races, and 9.7% from two or more races. Hispanic or Latino of any race were 11.7% of the population.

The census reported that 94.5% of the population lived in households, 5.5% lived in non-institutionalized group quarters, and 0.01% were institutionalized.

There were 110,007 households, out of which 34.4% included children under the age of 18, 51.6% were married-couple households, 5.5% were cohabiting couple households, 24.6% had a female householder with no partner present, and 18.3% had a male householder with no partner present. 22.4% of households were one person, and 6.1% were one person aged 65 or older. The average household size was 2.64. There were 73,781 families (67.1% of all households).

The age distribution was 21.0% under the age of 18, 14.3% aged 18 to 24, 30.7% aged 25 to 44, 23.0% aged 45 to 64, and 11.0% who were 65 years of age or older. The median age was 34.3 years. For every 100 females, there were 95.9 males.

There were 119,215 housing units at an average density of 1,817.0 units per square mile (701.5 units/km^{2}), of which 110,007 (92.3%) were occupied. Of these, 44.7% were owner-occupied, and 55.3% were occupied by renters.

In 2023, the US Census Bureau estimated that the median household income was $129,647, and the per capita income was $62,149. About 8.6% of families and 11.7% of the population were below the poverty line.

=== 2010 ===
The 2010 United States census reported that Irvine had a population of 212,375. The population density was 3,195.8 inhabitants per square mile (1,233.9/km^{2}). The racial makeup of Irvine was 107,215 (50.5%) White, 3,718 (1.8%) African American, 355 (0.2%) Native American, 83,176 (39.2%) Asian, 334 (0.2%) Pacific Islander, 5,867 (2.8%) from other races, and 11,710 (5.5%) from two or more races. Hispanic or Latino of any race were 19,621 persons (9.2%). Non-Hispanic Whites were 45.1% of the population.

The census reported that 205,819 people (96.9% of the population) lived in households, 5,968 (2.8%) lived in non-institutionalized group quarters, and 588 (0.3%) were institutionalized.

There were 78,978 households, out of which 26,693 (33.8%) had children under the age of 18 living in them, 40,930 (51.8%) were opposite-sex married couples living together, 7,545 (9.6%) had a female householder with no husband present, 2,978 (3.8%) had a male householder with no wife present. There were 3,218 (4.1%) unmarried opposite-sex partnerships, and 463 (0.6%) same-sex married couples or partnerships. 18,475 households (23.4%) were made up of individuals, and 4,146 (5.2%) had someone living alone who was 65 years of age or older. The average household size was 2.61. There were 51,453 families (65.1% of all households); the average family size was 3.13.

The age distribution of the population was as follows: 45,675 people (21.5%) under the age of 18, 30,384 people (14.3%) aged 18 to 24, 66,670 people (31.4%) aged 25 to 44, 51,185 people (24.1%) aged 45 to 64, and 18,461 people (8.7%) who were 65 years of age or older. The median age was 33.9 years. For every 100 females, there were 94.9 males. For every 100 females age 18 and over, there were 92.4 males.

There were 83,899 housing units at an average density of 1,262.5 per square mile (487.5/km^{2}), of which 39,646 (50.2%) were owner-occupied, and 39,332 (49.8%) were occupied by renters. The homeowner vacancy rate was 2.2%; the rental vacancy rate was 6.2%. 109,846 people (51.7% of the population) lived in owner-occupied housing units and 95,973 people (45.2%) lived in rental housing units.

During 2009–2013, Irvine had a median household income of $90,585, with 12.2% of the population living below the federal poverty line.

=== Older estimates ===
According to 2007 Census Bureau estimates, the median income for a household in the city was $98,923, and the median income for a family was $111,455; these numbers make Irvine the seventh richest city in the US, among cities with population 65,000 or higher. 9.1% of the population and 5.0% of families were below the poverty line. Of the total population, 6.1% of those under the age of 18 and 5.6% of those 65 and older were living below the poverty line.

In 2006, the median gross rent paid for housing was $1,660 a month. This was the highest of any place in the United States of more than 100,000 people. The skyrocketing high cost of housing is a major issue in Irvine and Orange County, as the city council faces pressure to approve future income-subsidized housing projects to meet the demands of working-class citizens.

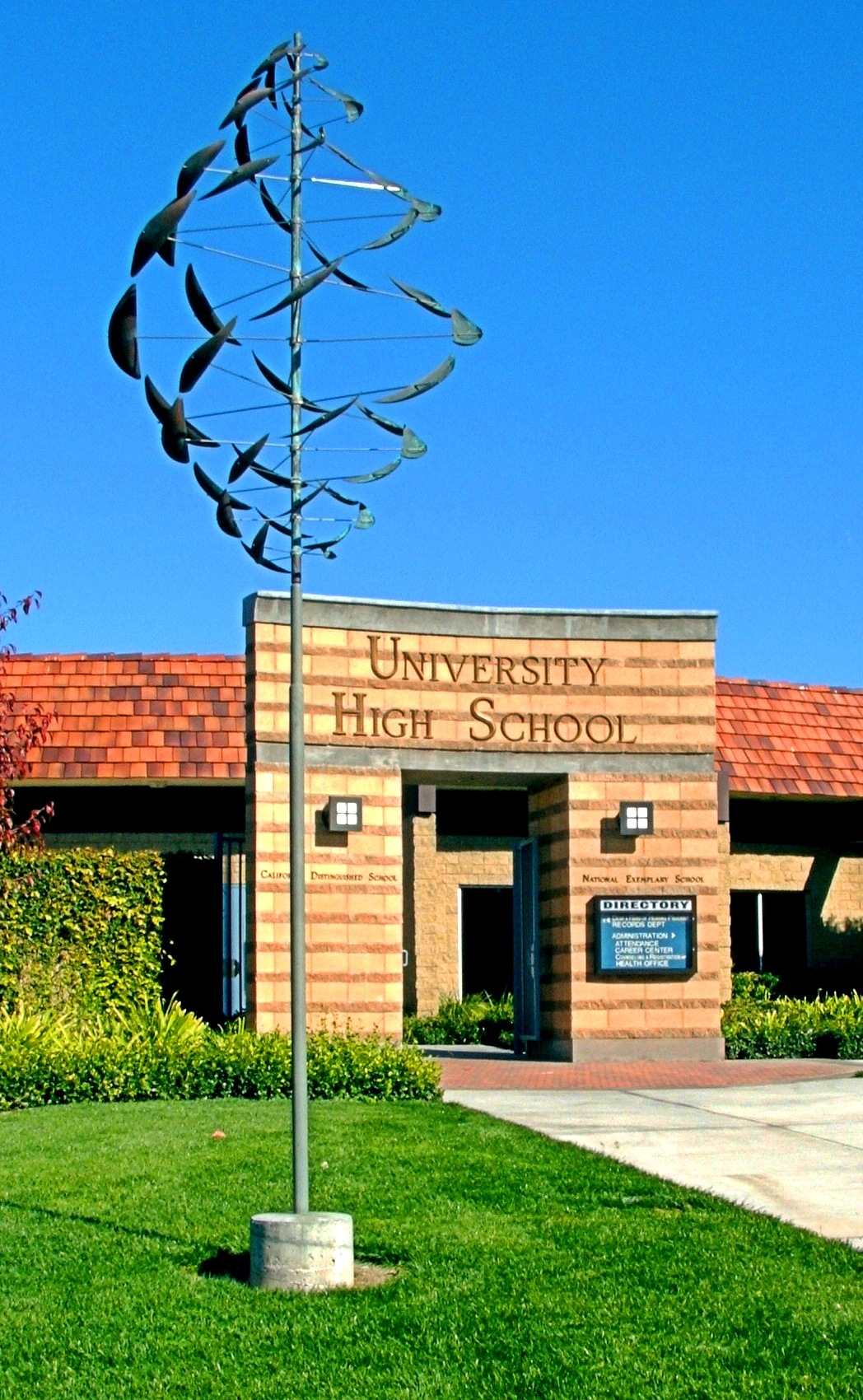
University High School in Irvine

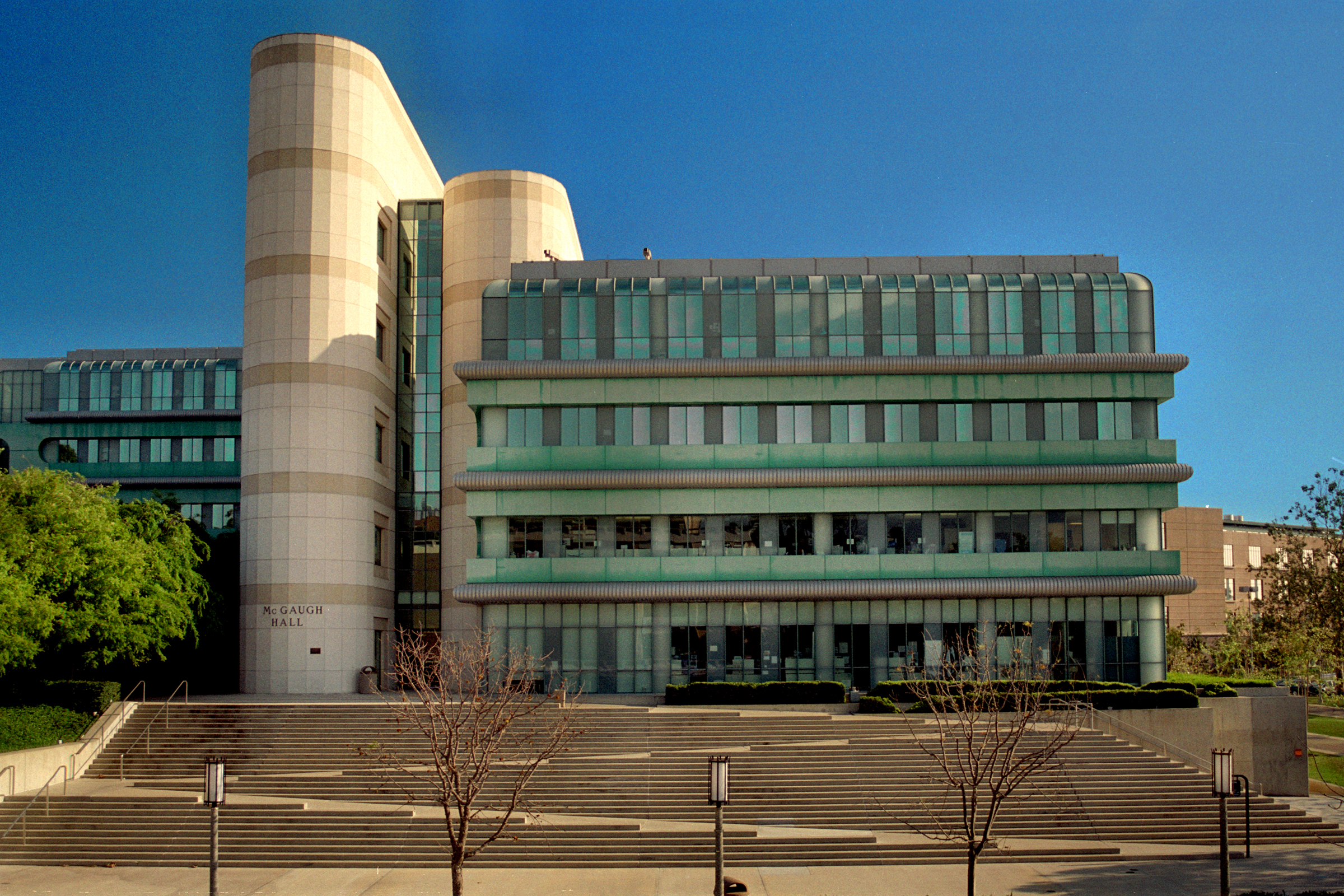
McGaugh Hall at the University of California, Irvine

== Economy ==
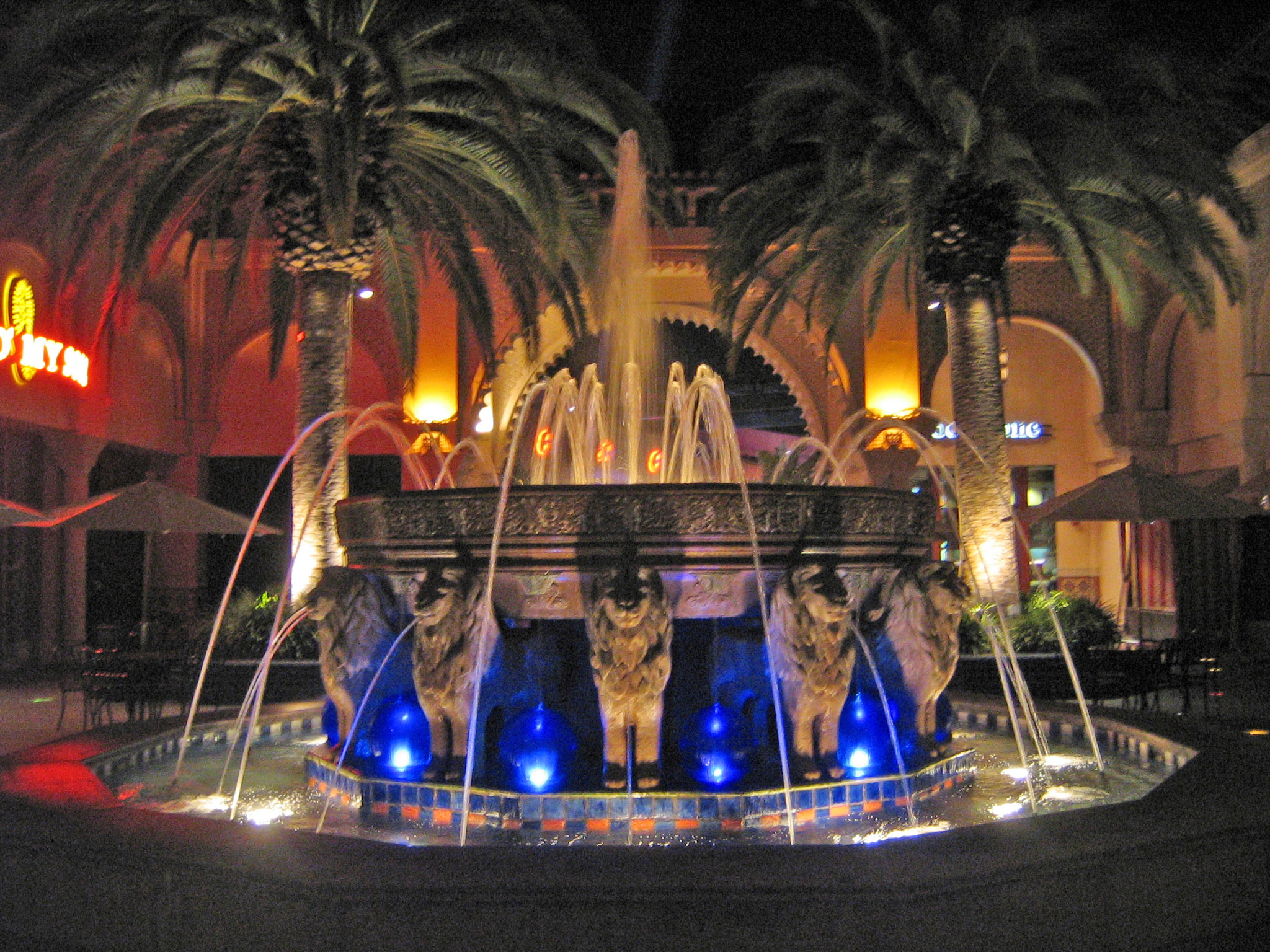
Fountain at Irvine Spectrum Center. The center and its surrounding areas constitute a significant part of Irvine's economy.

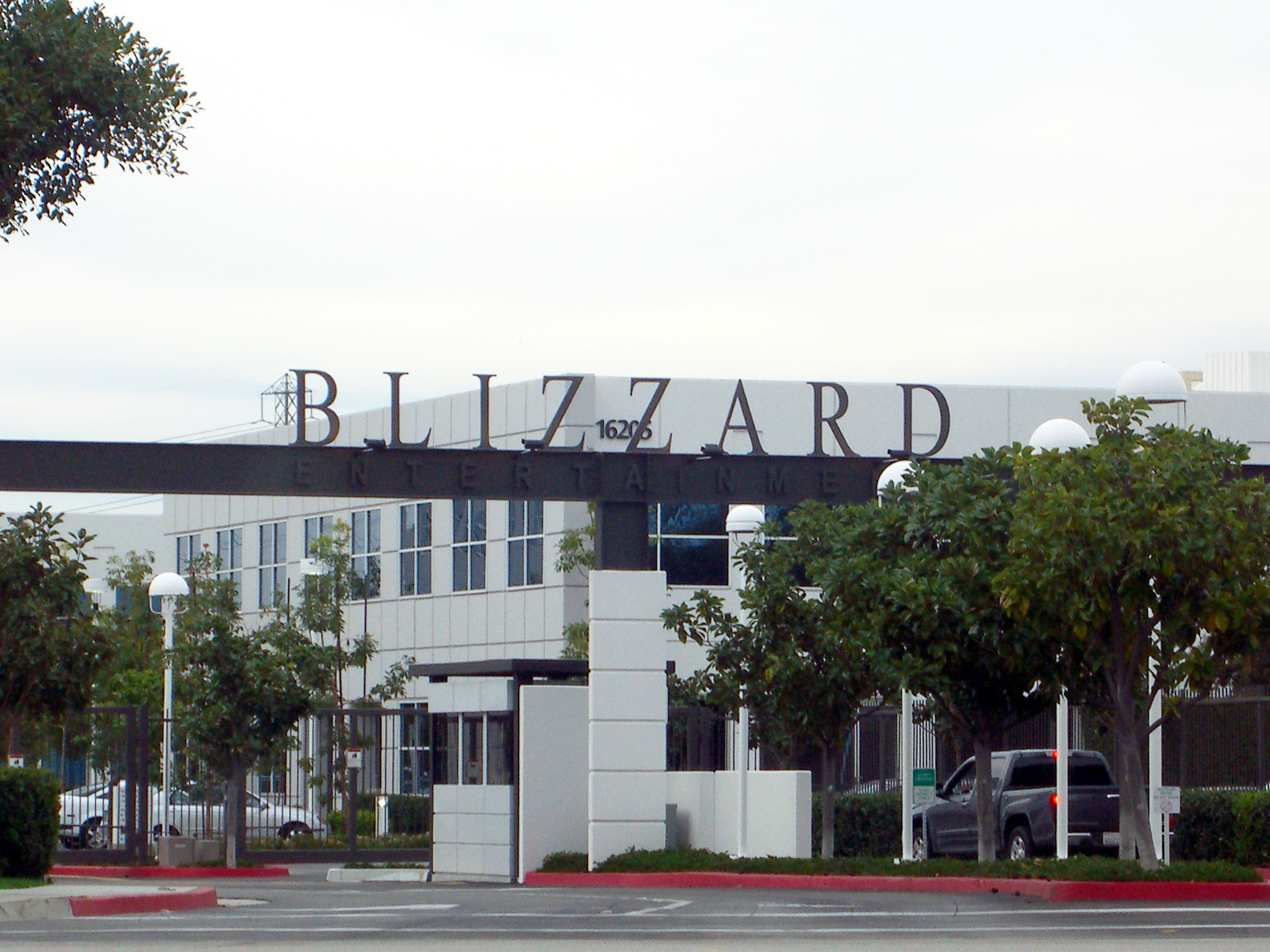
Blizzard Entertainment headquarters is located in Irvine.

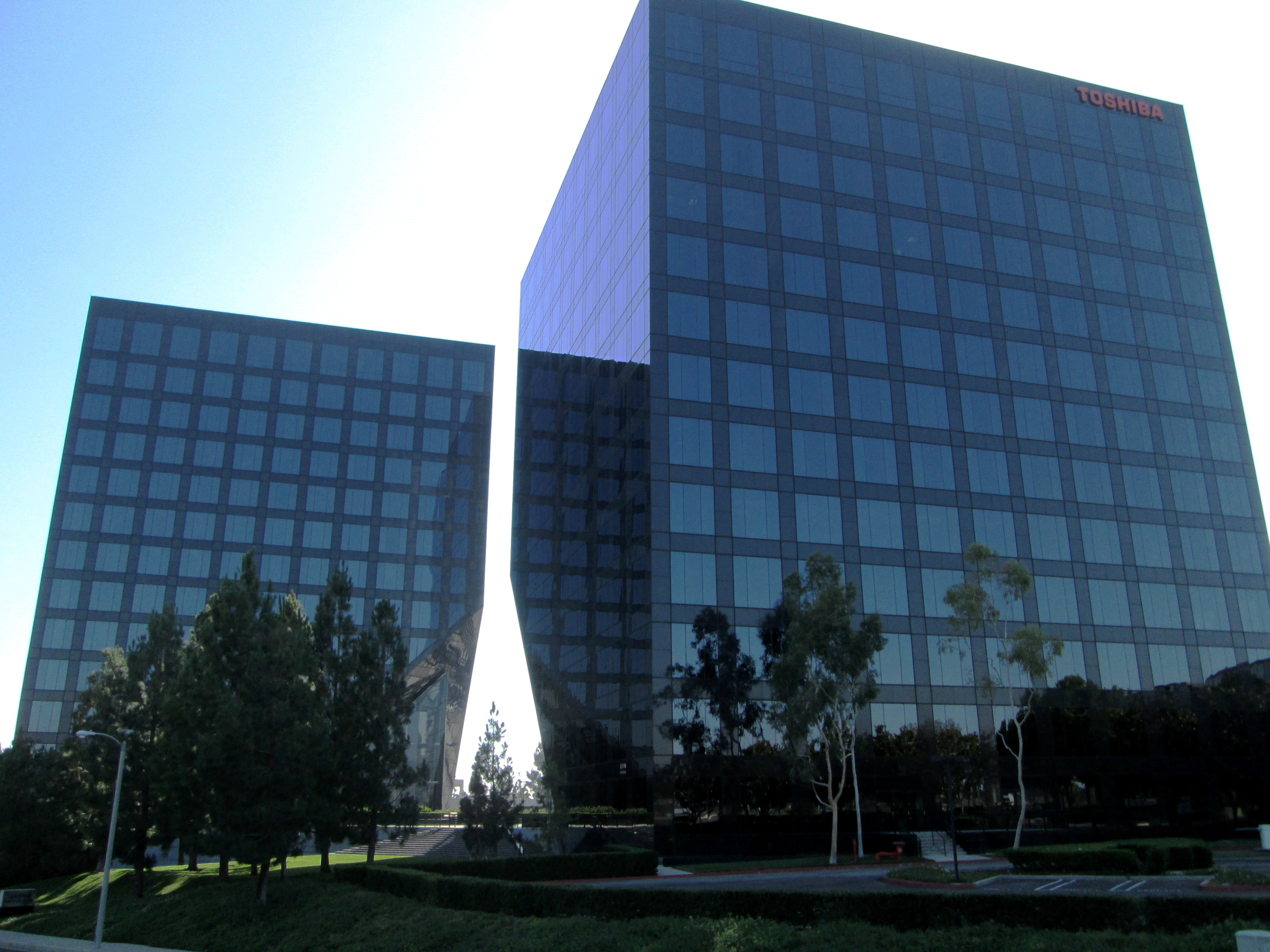
Among other companies, Toshiba America Electronics is located in the Newport Gateway buildings on MacArthur Boulevard.

Irvine's tourism information is coordinated through the Destination Irvine program run by the City of Irvine. The program provides information on Irvine as a place to vacation and as a destination for meetings, events and other business initiatives. Irvine has been rated one of the top cities for start-up businesses and its strong, fast-growing economy helped place Orange County as one of the top ten fastest growing job markets.

Irvine is also used as a location for film projects. The city government grants free or low-cost filming permits and offers location information to prospective productions.

=== Top employers ===
Largest employers
#	Employer	Employees (2021)	Industry	HQ
1	University of California, Irvine	18,373	Education	Yes
2	Blizzard Entertainment	4,022	Gaming	Yes
3	Irvine Unified School District	3,897	Education	Yes
4	Edwards Lifesciences	3,152	Healthcare	Yes
5	B.Braun	1,910	Healthcare	No
6	Center for Autism	1,892	Healthcare	No
7	Haskell	1,453	Architecture	No
8	Western Digital	1,350	Computer storage	No
9	Capital Group	1,198	Financial services	No
10	Thales Group	1,084	Aerospace	No

=== Business ===
The following companies are headquartered in Irvine:

- Alteryx
- Blizzard Entertainment
- Boot Barn
- Broadcom Corporation
- CalAmp
- CoreLogic
- CorVel Corporation
- Cylance
- Edwards Lifesciences
- Epicor Software Corporation
- Felt Bicycles
- Ford Motor Company (West Coast design center)
- Golden State Foods
- HID
- Ingram Micro
- In-N-Out Burger
- Karma Automotive
- Kelley Blue Book (subsidiary of Cox Automotive)
- Kofax
- LA Fitness
- Lifted Research Group
- Maruchan Inc. (a division of Toyo Suisan)
- Masimo
- MindFire, Inc
- NextGen Healthcare
- Obsidian Entertainment
- Panasonic Avionics Corporation
- Pacific Dental Services
- Pacific Premier Bank
- Premier Office Centers
- Printronix
- Razer
- Red Digital Cinema Camera Company
- Rivian
- Ruby's Diner
- Skyworks Solutions
- St. John
- Stüssy
- Super73
- Superformance, LLC
- Taco Bell (a division of Yum! Brands, Inc.)
- The Habit Burger Grill
- Tillys
- Ultimate Ears
- Vizio
- W. Brown & Associates
- Western Mutual Insurance Group
- Wimberly Allison Tong & Goo (WATG)
- Xumo
- Yogurtland

The following international companies have their North American headquarters in Irvine:

- ASICS
- Atlus
- Bandai Namco Entertainment (American division)
- Bandai Namco Holdings (American division)
- BenQ Corporation
- BSH Hausgeräte
- Dahua Technology
- Fisher & Paykel Healthcare
- Horiba
- Kia Motors
- KOG Games
- Marukome
- Mazda
- Nikken Sekkei
- Samsung Electronics (IT and printing division)
- Sega (American division)
- Shimano
- TCL Technology
- Toshiba

== Arts and culture ==
=== The Irvine Global Village Festival ===
Every October, Irvine hosts the Irvine Global Village Festival to celebrate the diversity among the citizens of Irvine and Orange County. The festival consists of exhibits from local merchants, entertainment from diverse cultures, and a sampling of foods from various regions of the world. The event is held at the Orange County Great Park.

=== Irvine Community Television ===
The Irvine Community Television (ICTV) produces and broadcasts television programs on news, sports, arts, culture, safety for the Irvine community. The motto of ICTV is "For You, About You". ICTV airs on Cox Communications channel 30 and online.

=== Libraries ===
Irvine has three public libraries: Heritage Park Regional Library, University Park Library, and Katie Wheeler Library. The Heritage Library serves as the regional reference library for Central Orange County and has a strong business and art focus while the University Park Library has 95,745 books, including a substantial Chinese collection. Katie Wheeler was the granddaughter of James Irvine, and the library is a replica of the house owned by Irvine in which she grew up. Additionally, most UCI Libraries are open to the public.

=== Points of interest ===
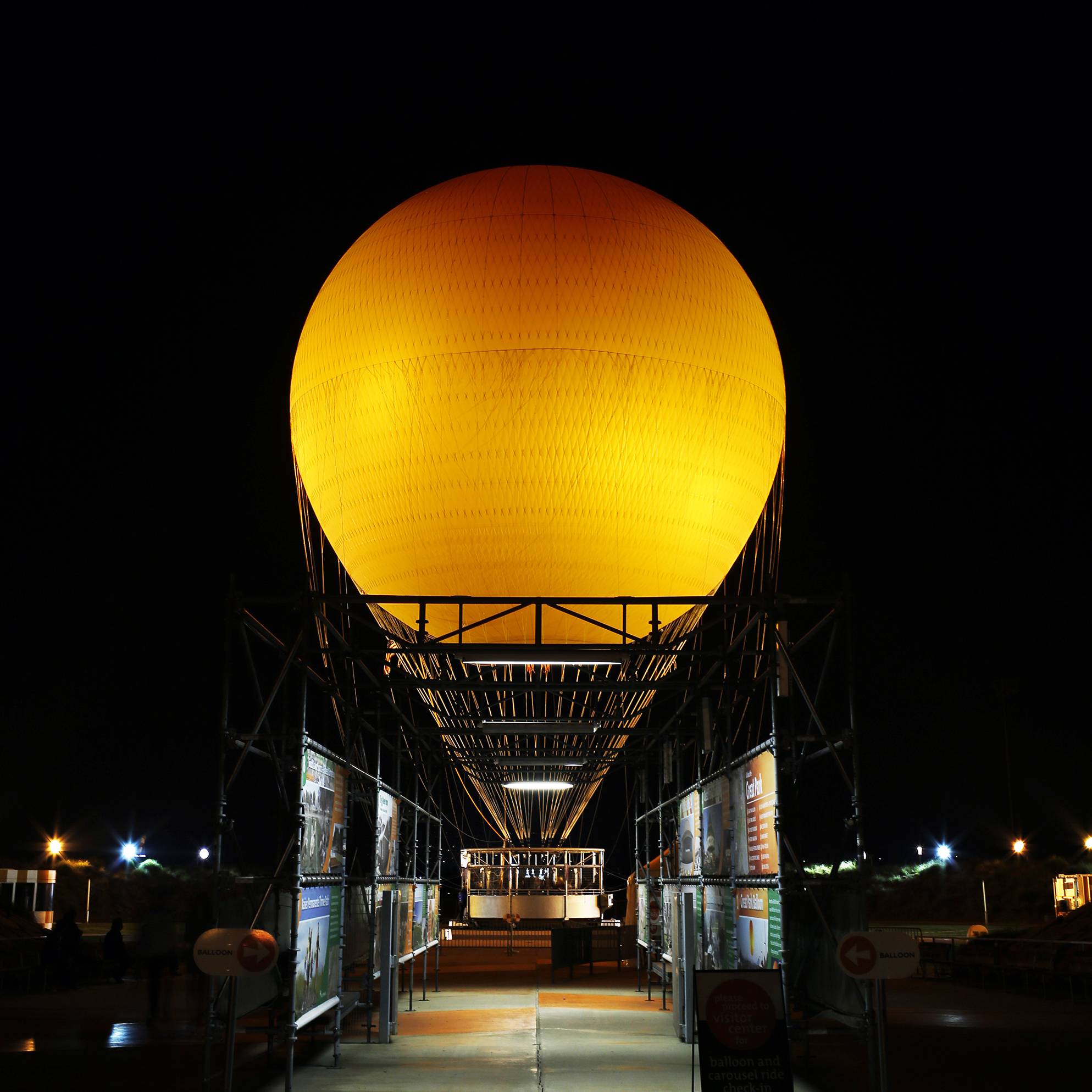
Orange County Great Park air balloon ride

- California State University Fullerton, Irvine Campus
- Concordia University, Irvine
- Heritage Park
- Irvine Spectrum Center
- Irvine Valley College
- Islamic Center of Irvine
- John Wayne Airport
- Mariners Church
- Mason Park
- Northwood Gratitude and Honor Memorial
- Orange County Great Park
- Pao Fa Temple
- Saddleback Church, Irvine Campuses
- San Joaquin Marsh Wildlife Sanctuary
- Tanaka Farms
- The Market Place
- Wild Rivers (water park)

== Registered Historic Places ==
- Irvine Bean and Growers Association Building
- Irvine Blacksmith Shop
- Frances Packing house
- Christ College Site

== Sports ==
Irvine is home to USA Water Polo, the national governing body of the sport of water polo.

Irvine is home to Orange County SC, a professional soccer team who is a member of the USL Championship. The team plays its home matches at Championship Soccer Stadium, located inside Great Park.

Irvine hosted the 2010 Pan Pacific Swimming Championships and will host the 2026 Pan Pacific Swimming Championships. Both editions of the Pan Pacific Swimming Championships use the William Woollett Jr. Aquatics Center.

== Parks and recreation ==
Community parks in Irvine have public facilities located on each site, and neighborhood parks provide open space and some recreational amenities within the various villages of Irvine.

Northwood Community Park features the Northwood Gratitude and Honor Memorial, a memorial to U.S. soldiers who died in the Iraq War and the War in Afghanistan, and the first memorial in the United States built before the wars ended.

Other parks include:

- Aldrich Park – A 19-acre (7.7 ha) park at UC Irvine campus. The park marks the center of the planned city, and features a plaque to Daniel Aldrich.
- Jeffrey Open Space Trail
- San Joaquin Wildlife Sanctuary
- William R. Mason Regional Park

== Government ==
=== Local government ===
Irvine is a charter city, operating under a council–manager form of government.

==== City Council ====
The City Council consists of the mayor and six City Council members. The Mayor serves a two-year term and Council members serve four-year terms. The city has a two-term limit for elected officials. Elections are held every two years, in even-numbered years. Before 2024, two Council members and the Mayor's seat were up for consideration in each election. The City Council appoints the City Manager, who functions as the chief administrator of the city. The City Council sets the policies for the city, and the City Manager is responsible for implementing the policies. The City Council appoints volunteers that serve on various advisory boards, commissions and committees.

In October 2023, the Irvine City Council voted to propose an amendment to the city charter to elect council members by district and expand the council to seven members. The Council also adopted a district map to take effect if Irvine voters approved the Measure D charter amendment. After voters approved the charter amendment in the March 2024 Primary Election, Irvine elected its first Council members by district in Irvine's 2024 municipal elections. Council districts 2, 3 and 4 elected Council members in presidential election years and Council districts 1, 5 and 6 will elect Council members in midterm election years. In 2024, Council District 1 also elected a Council member to serve a shortened two-year term until its first regular election in 2026. Irvine's mayor continues to be elected citywide. The current mayor is Larry Agran.

According to the city's Comprehensive Annual Financial Report for FY2014–2015, as of June 30, 2015, the city has net assets of $2.59 billion. FY2014–15 revenues totaled $395.2 million, with property tax accounting for $50.7 million and sales tax accounting for $58.8 million. As of June 30, 2015, the city's governmental funds reported combined ending fund balances of $960.9 million.

==== City departments ====
The city of Irvine is served by eight departments. These departments are responsible for managing and performing all of the business of the City Hall and its services.

Support services are provided through other agencies including: Irvine Unified School District, Tustin Unified School District, Southern California Edison, Irvine Ranch Water District, and Orange County Fire Authority.

=== Federal, state, and county representation ===
In the California State Senate, Irvine is in the 37th senatorial district, represented by Republican Steven Choi. In the California State Assembly, Irvine is in the 73rd Assembly district, represented by Democrat Cottie Petrie-Norris.

In the United States House of Representatives, Irvine is in California's 47th congressional district, represented by Democrat Dave Min.

Additionally, in the Orange County Board of Supervisors, Irvine is split between two districts:

- third district, represented by Donald P. Wagner since 2019.
- fifth district, represented by Katrina Foley since 2023.

==== Politics ====
According to the California Secretary of State's April 3, 2026 report, Irvine has 162,440 registered voters, with Democrats holding a 39.13% to 25.57% registration advantage over Republicans, and 30.12% of voters declaring no party preference. By raw volume, Irvine possesses the third-largest absolute Democratic registration advantage over Republicans among all cities in Orange County (+22,024 voters), trailing only Anaheim and Santa Ana, and ranks fifth countywide in its Democratic-to-Republican registration margin (+13.56 percentage points). This political alignment has also translated to ballot measure outcomes; in the November 2025 special election, Irvine voters approved Proposition 50, a constitutional amendment that temporarily replaced the independent redistricting commission's congressional maps with legislatively drawn districts. The measure passed in the city with 65.02% support (a margin of 30.04 percentage points), marking the second-highest level of support for the initiative among all incorporated cities in Orange County, behind only Santa Ana, and closely tracking the statewide result of 64.42%.

United States presidential election results for Irvine
Year	Republican		Democratic		Third party(ies)	
Year	No.	%	No.	%	No.	%
2024	44,411	36.90%	70,220	58.35%	5,718	4.75%
2020	42,832	33.58%	82,067	64.35%	2,639	2.07%
2016	29,513	32.05%	56,417	61.27%	6,155	6.68%
2012	35,866	43.71%	43,954	53.57%	2,235	2.72%
2008	34,152	40.60%	48,110	57.20%	1,851	2.20%
2004	36,005	52.28%	32,130	46.65%	733	1.06%
2000	29,045	52.26%	24,314	43.75%	2,219	3.99%

Irvine voted for the Republican presidential candidate in every election from 1976 to 2004. The city's shift toward the Democratic Party beginning in 2008 coincided with significant demographic changes, particularly the rapid growth of its Asian American population, which expanded from 18% of residents in 1990 to 39% by 2010 and 45% by 2020. This shift reflected a broader national realignment among Asian American voters, whose support for Democratic presidential candidates rose from 36% in 1992 to 64% in 2008. Researchers have also identified educational attainment as a factor in Irvine's political alignment; over 72% of Irvine residents hold college degrees, and academics at the University of California, Irvine have described the city as a prominent example of the "diploma divide," in which highly educated communities have shifted toward the Democratic Party. Since 2008, Irvine has voted Democratic in every presidential election, and since 2014, in every gubernatorial election as well.

Gubernatorial election results for Irvine
Year	Republican		Democratic		Third party(ies)	
Year	No.	%	No.	%	No.	%
2022	31,666	38.97%	49,582	61.03%	0	0.00%
2018	33,513	38.30%	53,982	61.70%	0	0.00%
2014	20,320	48.30%	21,751	51.70%	0	0.00%
2010	30,915	51.08%	25,659	42.39%	3,952	6.53%
2006	31,140	66.61%	13,385	28.63%	2,224	4.76%
2003	27,710	60.52%	9,252	20.21%	8,823	19.27%
2002	20,291	53.25%	14,625	38.38%	3,189	8.37%

The Irvine City Council currently consists of five Democrats and two Republicans, with Democrat Larry Agran serving as mayor following his election in 2024. Municipal elections in Irvine are officially nonpartisan, meaning candidates' party affiliations do not appear on the ballot.

=== Crime ===
The Uniform Crime Report (UCR), collected annually by the FBI, compiles police statistics from local and state law enforcement agencies across the nation. The UCR records Part I and Part II crimes. Part I crimes become known to law enforcement and are considered the most serious crimes including homicide, rape, robbery, aggravated assault, burglary, larceny, motor vehicle theft, and arson. Part II crimes only include arrest data. The 2023 UCR Data for Irvine is listed below:

2023 UCR Data
	Aggravated Assault	Homicide	Rape	Robbery	Burglary	Larceny Theft	Motor Vehicle Theft	Arson
Irvine	131	2	64	77	808	3,807	273	16

== Education ==
=== Primary and secondary education ===
Most of Irvine is located in the Irvine Unified School District (IUSD). The five high schools in IUSD are University High School, Irvine High School, Northwood High School, Woodbridge High School, and Portola High School. Arnold O. Beckman High School is located in Irvine but is administered by Tustin Unified School District. The five high schools in IUSD, as well as Beckman High School, have consistently placed in the upper range of Newsweek's list of the Top 1,300 U.S. Public High Schools. Crean Lutheran High School, a private Lutheran high school, and Tarbut V' Torah, a Jewish day school, are also located in Irvine.

Irvine is also home to elementary and middle schools, including two alternative, year round, open enrollment K-8 schools, Plaza Vista and Vista Verde. Parts of the north and west of the city are within the Tustin Unified School District. A very small portion of the city, near Orange County Great Park, is located within the Saddleback Valley Unified School District. The southwest portion of the city near John Wayne International Airport is located within the Santa Ana Unified School District.

=== Colleges and universities ===
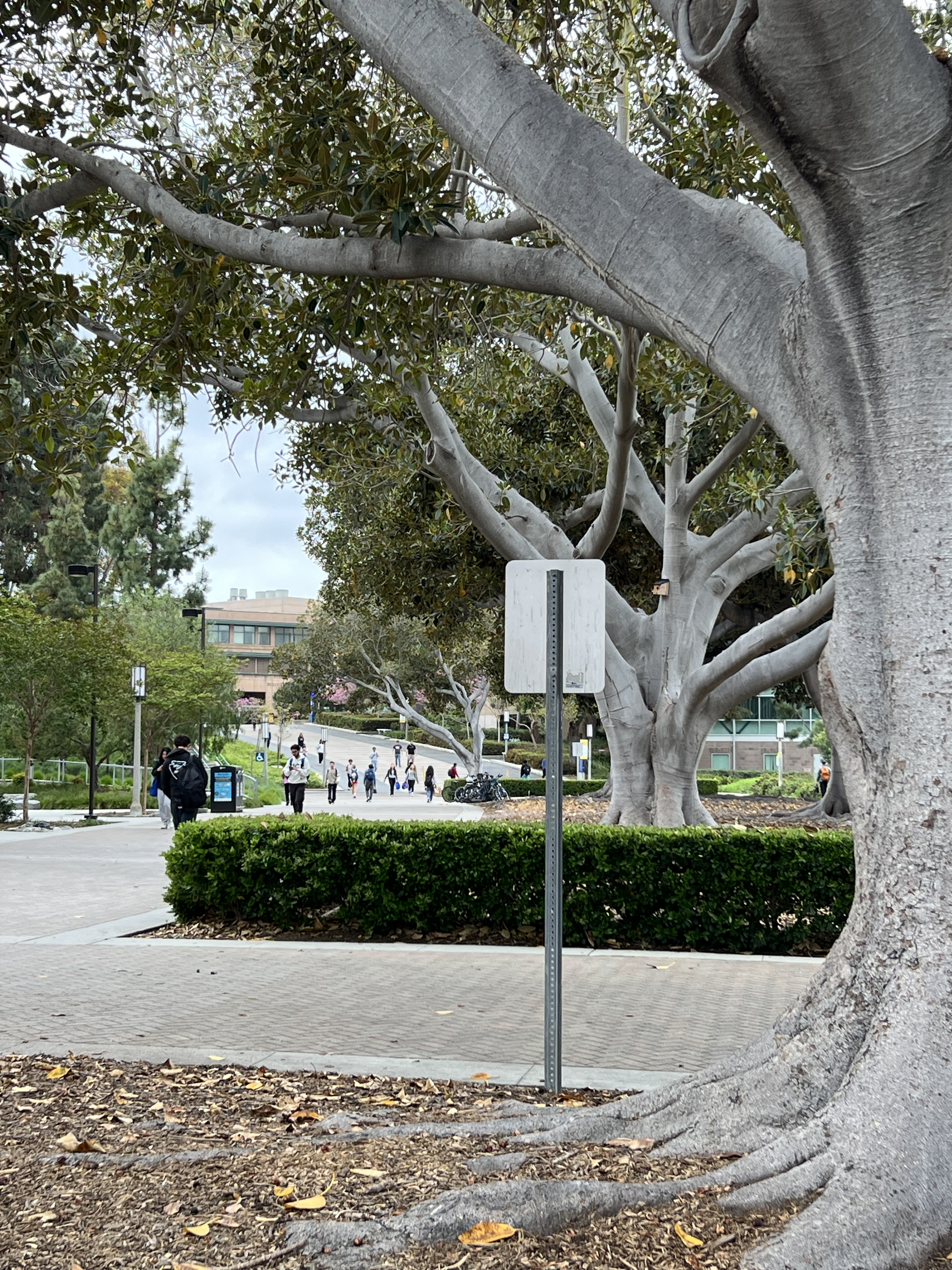
UC Irvine Campus

Irvine is home to the University of California, Irvine, which is the second-newest campus (established 1965) in the UC system after University of California, Merced. Other higher education institutions in Irvine include California Southern University, Concordia University, Westcliff University, Irvine Valley College, Fuller Theological Seminary, FIDM, The Fashion Institute of Design and Merchandising, Orange County Campus, and Stanbridge University.

According to the 2000 United States census, Irvine is ranked 7th nationwide, among cities with populations of at least 100,000, for having the highest percentage of people who are at least 25 years old with doctoral degrees, with 3,589 residents reporting such educational attainment.

== Infrastructure ==
=== Transportation ===
==== Air ====
Commercial and general aviation services are available at John Wayne Airport, located adjacent to the western border of Irvine.

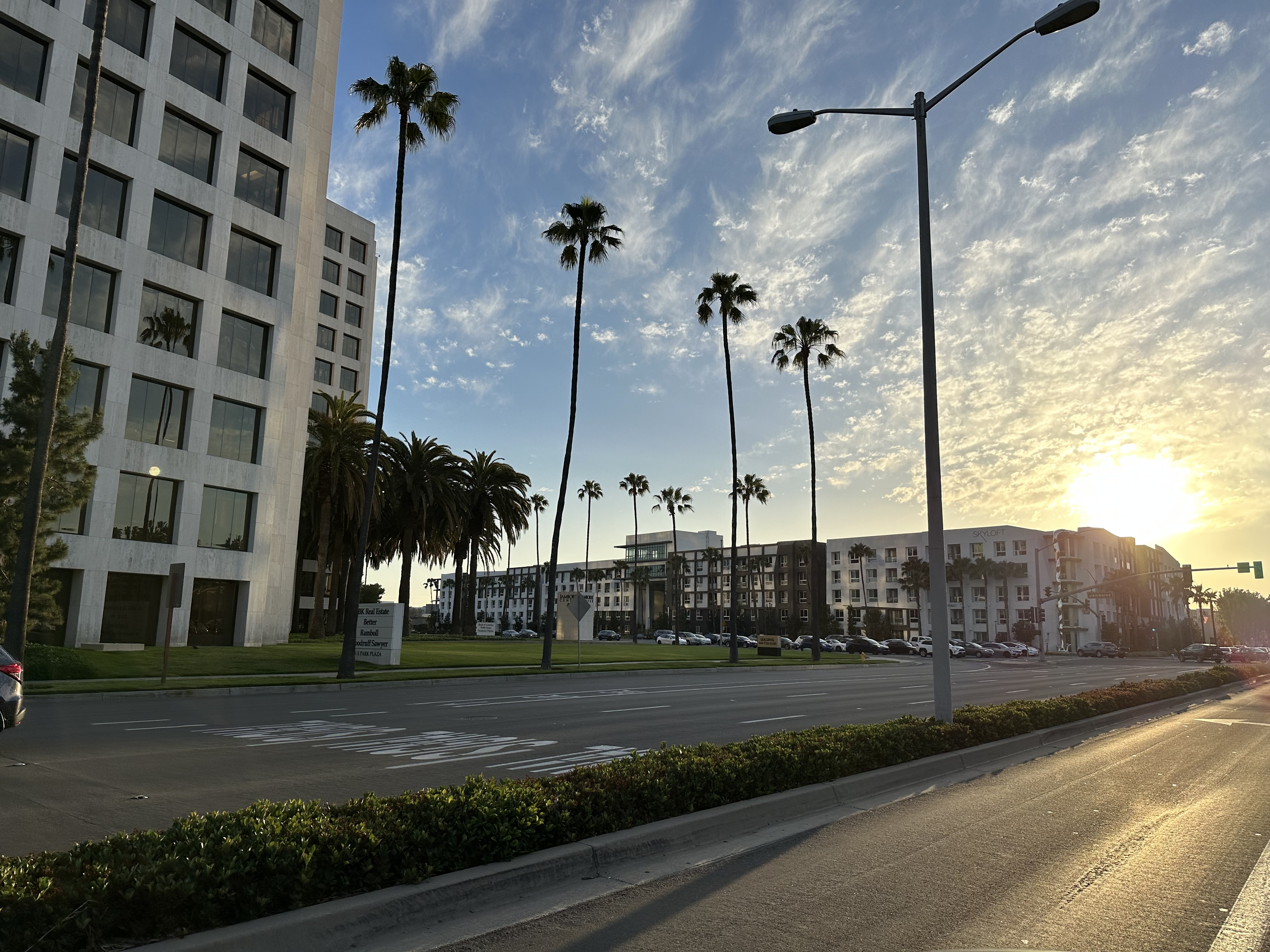
Intersection of Jamboree and Main showing a typical Irvine road

==== Automotive ====
Streets and intersections owned by the city have trademark mahogany signage and are fiber optically linked to the city's Irvine Traffic Research and Control Center (ITRAC). Traffic cameras and ground sensors monitor the flow of traffic throughout the city and automatically adjust signal timing to line up traffic, allowing more vehicles to avoid red lights. Several major highways pass through Irvine (Interstate 5, and Interstate 405, California State Route 73, California State Route 133, California State Route 241, and California State Route 261). Major arteries through Irvine are built out widely and run in a northeasterly direction with speed limits of 50 mph (80 km/h) or greater.

In 2015, 5.0 percent of Irvine households lacked a car; this percentage decreased to 4.0 percent in 2016. The national average was 8.7 percent in 2016. Irvine averaged 1.83 cars per household in 2016, compared to a national average of 1.8.

==== Mass transit and freight services ====
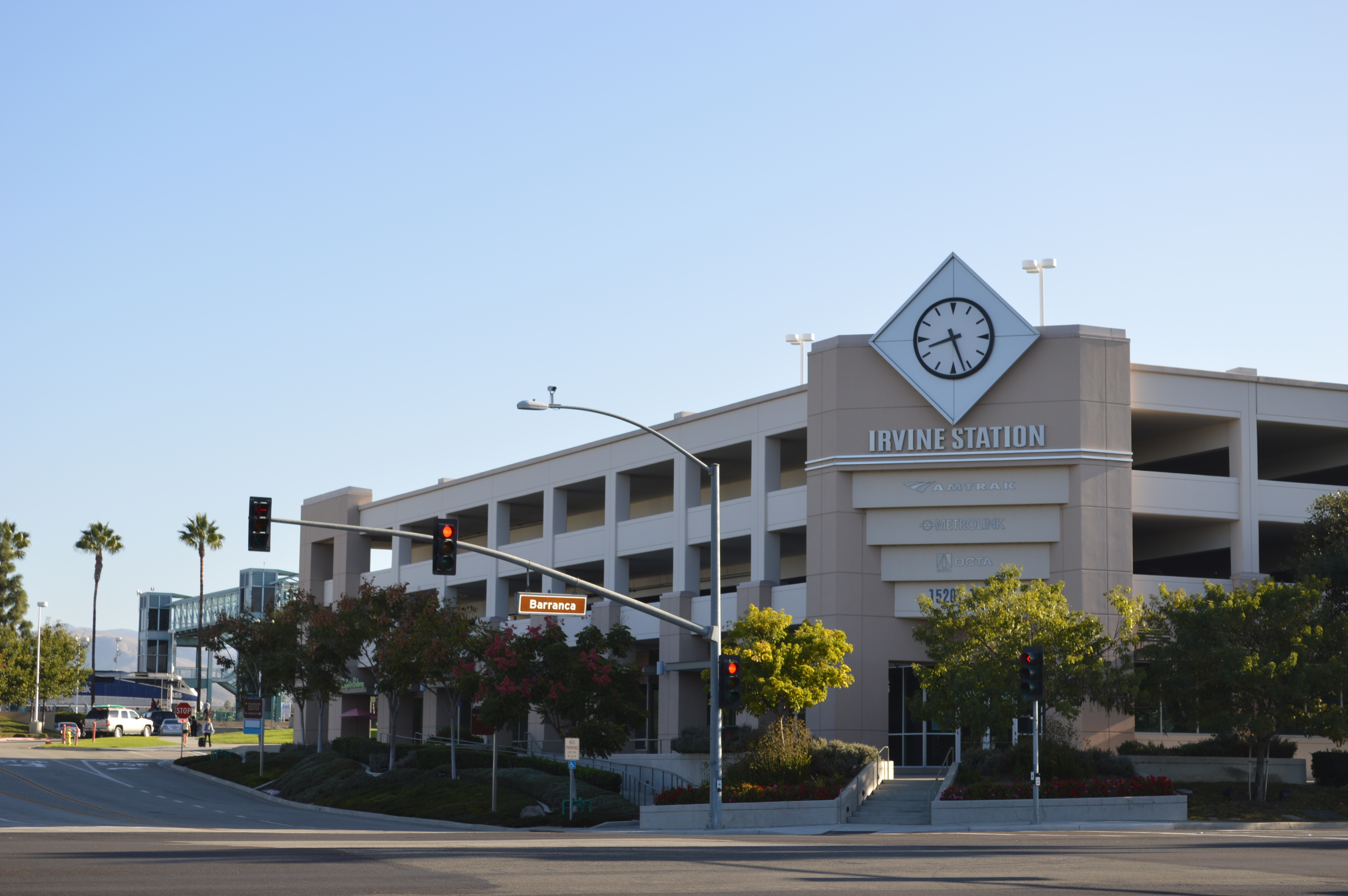
The Irvine Transportation Center, also known as the Irvine Station

===== Bus and shuttle services =====
The Orange County Transportation Authority (OCTA) operates 18 bus routes servicing 396 stops in Irvine. Additionally, OCTA operates and manages iShuttle, a series of three specialty routes servicing the Irvine area. Two lines, Route 400A and Route 401B, connect the Tustin Metrolink Station to the Irvine Business Complex area. Route 400A provides service between the Tustin Metrolink Station and John Wayne Airport with stops along Von Karman Avenue. Route 401B heads along Jamboree Road before continuing through Main Street and Michelson Drive. The remaining line, Route 403D, offer connections between the Irvine Station and the Irvine Spectrum Area, which includes major employers such as Kaiser Permanente – Irvine Medical Center, and Hoag Hospital Irvine, the Irvine Spectrum Center, and residential communities The Park and The Village.

The city launched its own shuttle service, Irvine CONNECT, in April 2024. The route passes through Northwood and El Camino Real via Yale Avenue, then Woodbridge, Oak Creek, and the Irvine Spectrum area via Barranca Parkway and Alton Parkway, before terminating at Irvine Station. Shuttles arrive at roughly 20-minute intervals. The city plans to expand service north to Portola Parkway beginning in July 2025.

===== Passenger rail =====
Irvine Station, also referred to as Irvine Transportation Center, is served by Amtrak's Pacific Surfliner train as well as Metrolink's Orange County Line and Inland Empire-Orange County Line. Metrolink and Pacific Surfliner Monthly Pass holders may use both Metrolink and Amtrak services at this station through the Rail 2 Rail program.

Tustin Metrolink Station, located adjacent to Irvine's western boundary, is served only by Metrolink.

In 2003, the City of Irvine designated a site 1.5 mi (2.4 km) from Irvine Station as the future location of the Orange County Maintenance Facility (OCMF), a storage and service facility for Metrolink trains. An environmental study for the project was finalized in June 2022 and a Notice of Determination was filed by OCTA in October 2023.

===== Freight rail =====
A major contributing factor to the growth of Irvine was the freight rail provided by ATSF (now BNSF) Transportation. The Venta Spur was Irvine's first spur. Built in the 1920s, it moved citrus from three processing plants in what is now Northwood to the rest of the country. The processing plants were essentially Irvine's first and biggest employers of the time.

The plants started to go out of business in the 1970s and the spur was abandoned in 1985. In 1999, following its donation to the city of Irvine, it was turned into the Venta Spur bike trail.

The Irvine Industrial Spur is the second railroad spur in Irvine. It serves various industries in Irvine's Business Complex.

==== Bikeways ====
Irvine offers a vast system of bicycle lanes, paths, and trails to encourage the recreational use of bikes as a means of transportation. There are 113.2 mi (182.2 km) of off-road bicycle trails and 286.4 mi (461 km) of on-road bicycle lanes in Irvine.

=== Emergency services ===
Irvine contracts with the Orange County Fire Authority for fire protection and ambulance service is provided by private companies. Law enforcement is provided by the Irvine Police Department (IPD). The IPD operates in a suburban city rated as having one of the lowest violent crime rates among cities with over 100,000 inhabitants by the FBI every year since 2005. The University of California Police Department also has jurisdiction – including arrest power – in areas of the city near the UC Irvine campus, while the California State University Police Department has similar jurisdiction in areas of the city near the CSU Fullerton Irvine campus. Irvine Valley College also maintains its own on-campus police department.

=== Healthcare ===
Irvine is served by several healthcare facilities:

- Hoag Hospital - Irvine (Hospital)
- Hoag Orthopedic Institute (Specialty Hospital)
- Kaiser Permanente Orange County-Irvine Medical Center (Hospital)
- St. Joseph Heritage Medical Group - Irvine (Clinic)
- UCI Health - Irvine Hospital (Acute-care Hospital)

=== Water services ===
Water in Irvine is supplied by the Irvine Ranch Water District, which sources its water from the Metropolitan Water District of Southern California, importing water from the State Water Project and the Colorado River Aqueduct. Local groundwater is pumped from an underground reservoir. Additional water comes from the Harding Canyon Dam watershed and the Santiago Creek Dam watershed.

== Sister cities ==
Irvine has four sister cities:

- Tsukuba, Ibaraki, Japan
- Taoyuan District, Taoyuan City, Taiwan
- Hermosillo, Sonora, Mexico
- Seocho-gu, Seoul, South Korea
