= Old Town Irvine =

California historic landmark

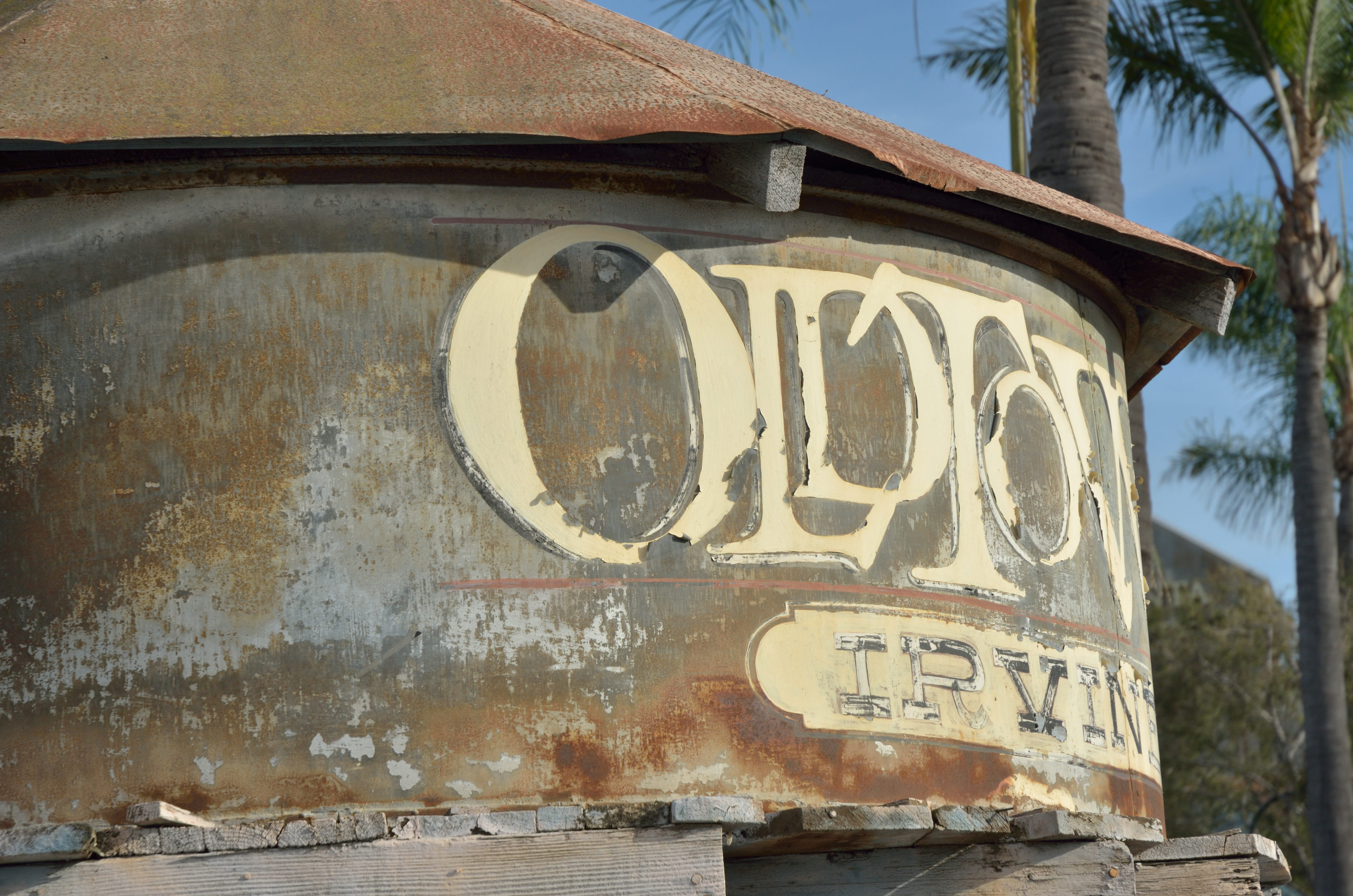
- Old Town Irvine

- Location within California
- 33°40′31″N 117°45′28″W
- Location: Irvine, California

History
- Built: 1887

California Historical Landmark
- Designated: November 11, 1991
- Reference no.: 1004

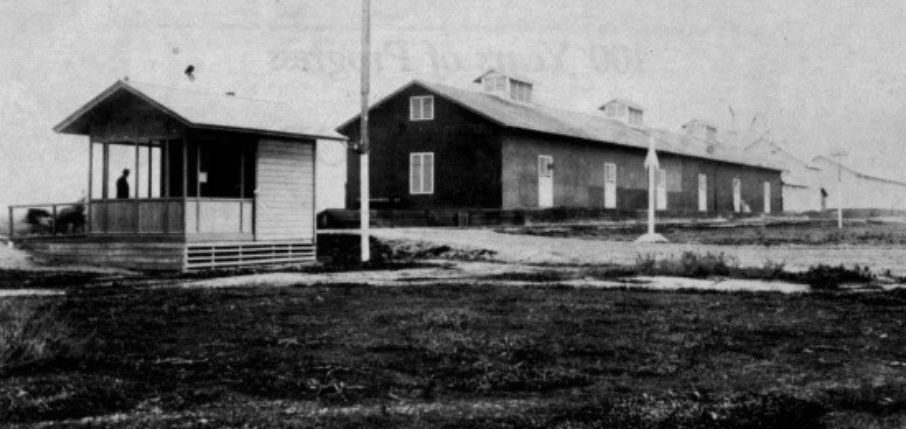
Irvine Ranch Bean warehouse and a temporary train station in 1895

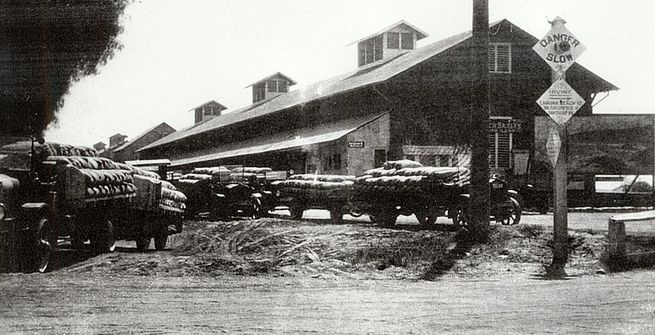
Irvine bean warehouse in 1922

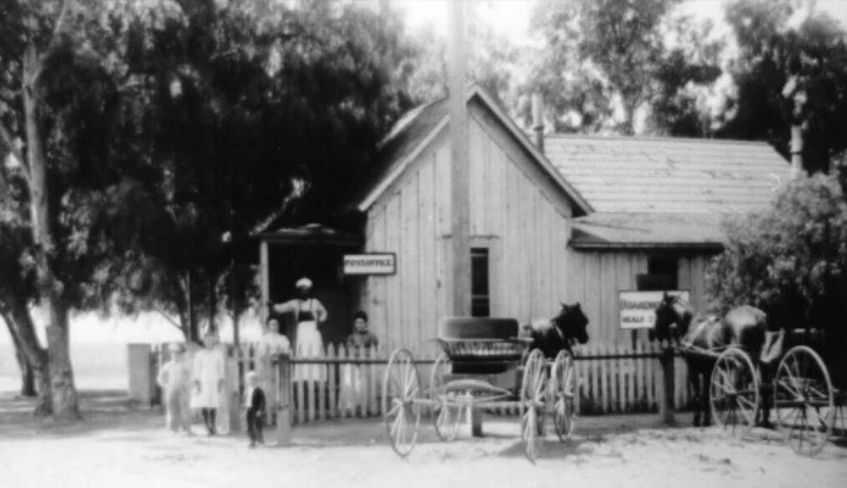
Irvine US Post Office in 1899

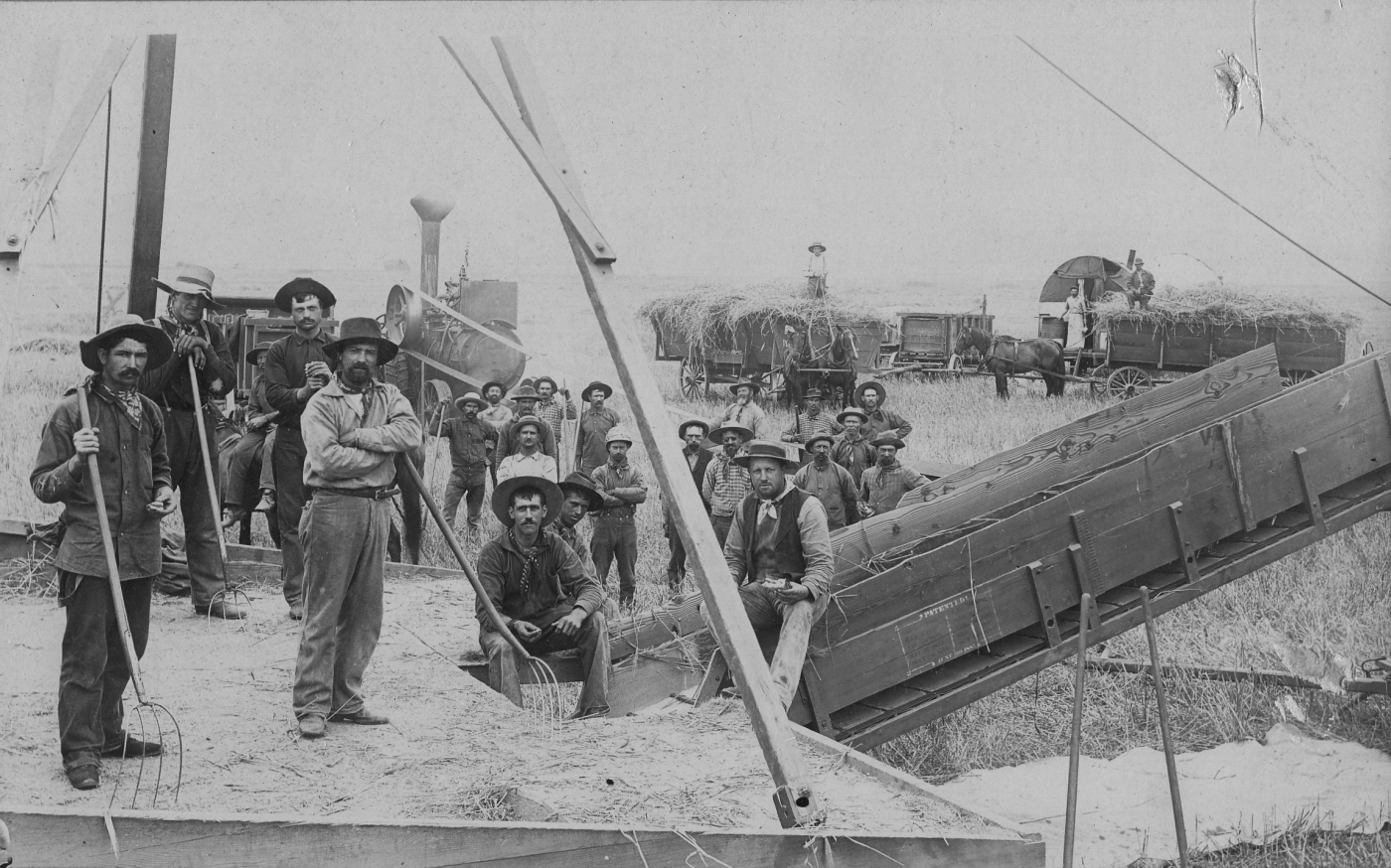
Irvine Ranch farming in 1897

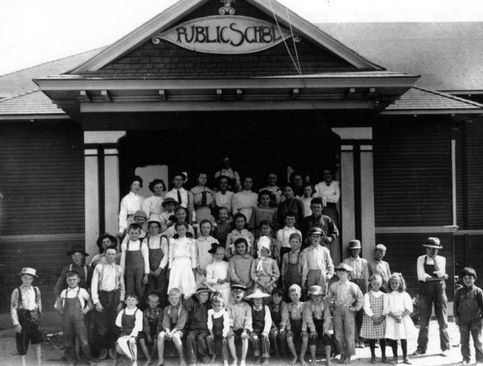
Irvine School house in 1899, built by James Irvine

Old Town Irvine was designated a California Historic Landmark (No.1004) on November 11, 1991. Old Town Irvine is in the city of Irvine, California in Orange County A Historic marker is at 14980 Sand Canyon Avenue, Irvine. The marker is to remember the foundation of the settlement of Irvine in 1887. Irvine started as a train stop for the Santa Fe Railroad in 1889, where a barley warehouse was built. At the time of founding, the settlement was called Myford, California. Myford was the youngest son of James H. Irvine, whom the town would be renamed after. James Irvine called the new town Myford, as at the time there was a City of Irvine in Calaveras County in Northern California. Myford was renamed Irvine in 1914, as the Northern California town changed its name to Carson Hill. The 125,000-acre Irvine Ranch was the largest employer in the town for years, a very busy place during harvest time. The town had a school, general store, blacksmith shop, diner, and a hotel for seasonal workers, all around Central Avenue and the train station. The Ranch lost its place as the center of town in the 1960s, with the housing boom and a new town center was built up. Irvine incorporated as a city in 1971. The old portions of Irvine, renamed East Irvine, had become run down. Much of the old Ranch in East Irvine was abandoned or taken down. Central Avenue was renamed Sand Canyon Ave, which became a main highway.

The 1980 plan to make Sand Canyon Avenue wider threatened some of the Historic Landmarks in Irvine. A Historic Preservation Committee was formed and the town worked to save Old Town Irvine. The City of Irvine working with the Sand Canyon Historical Partners and the Irvine Historical Society came up with a plan to reuse some of the old buildings. The J. Ray Construction Company converted the blacksmith shop into a restaurant (retaining much of its historic tools and machines as decor), the sorting house as retail space, and the granary into a hotel. Buildings originally located nearby were moved to the site, including the historic Irvine General Store.

== Historic Old Town Irvine ==
Historic buildings in Old Town Irvine restored:

- The 1895 Sack Warehouse is now office space.
- The 1895 Post Office, reopened.
- The 1912 Irvine Ranch General Store, moved in 1986, now retail and offices space.
- The 1913 Irvine Hotel, moved in 1986, offices space.
- The 1947 Bulk processing warehouse, rebuilt as La Quinta Hotel, with 150 rooms.
- The 1908 Blacksmith shop, rebuilt to Knowlwood Restaurant.
- The 1915 Irvine Service Station, move in 1925 to Burt and Sand Canyon, rebuilt, now fast food restaurant
- The 1929 Irvine Garage, then a Ford dealership, rebuilt to a Denny's restaurant.
- The 1929 Irvine school, rebuilt now a community center.

== Historical Markers ==
Marker at the site reads:

- The townsite began in 1887 with the arrival of the AT&SF RR. James Irvine II chose this site to be the shipping center for crops grown on the Irvine Ranch, due to its high elevation. Original buildings remaining include the Bean Shed (1895), Bulk Storage Warehouse (1949), Blacksmith Shop (1912), Garage (1929), Tenant Farmhouse (1897), General Store (1912), and Hotel (1913). The hotel and store were moved from across Sand Canyon Avenue in 1986. Erected 1987 by Santa Ana Parlor No. 235, Native Daughters of the Golden West, Santa Ana. (Marker Number 1004.)

Marker records at Office of Historic Preservation reads:

- NO. 1004 OLD TOWN IRVINE – Old Town Irvine stands today as a testament to the rich agricultural past of what has become one of California's most heavily urban counties. Founded in 1887 as the distribution and storage center of the 125,000-acre Irvine ranch, Old Town Irvine was to develop over the years a bean and grain storage warehouse (1895) and granary (1947) known as the Irvine Bean and Grain Grower's Building, a blacksmith's shop (1916), a hotel (1913), a general store (1911), and an employees' bungalow (1915). All of these structures have been rehabilitated for commercial uses and their exteriors have been painstakingly maintained.

== See also ==
- California Historical Landmarks in Orange County, California
