= William R. Mason Regional Park =

Park in Irvine, California

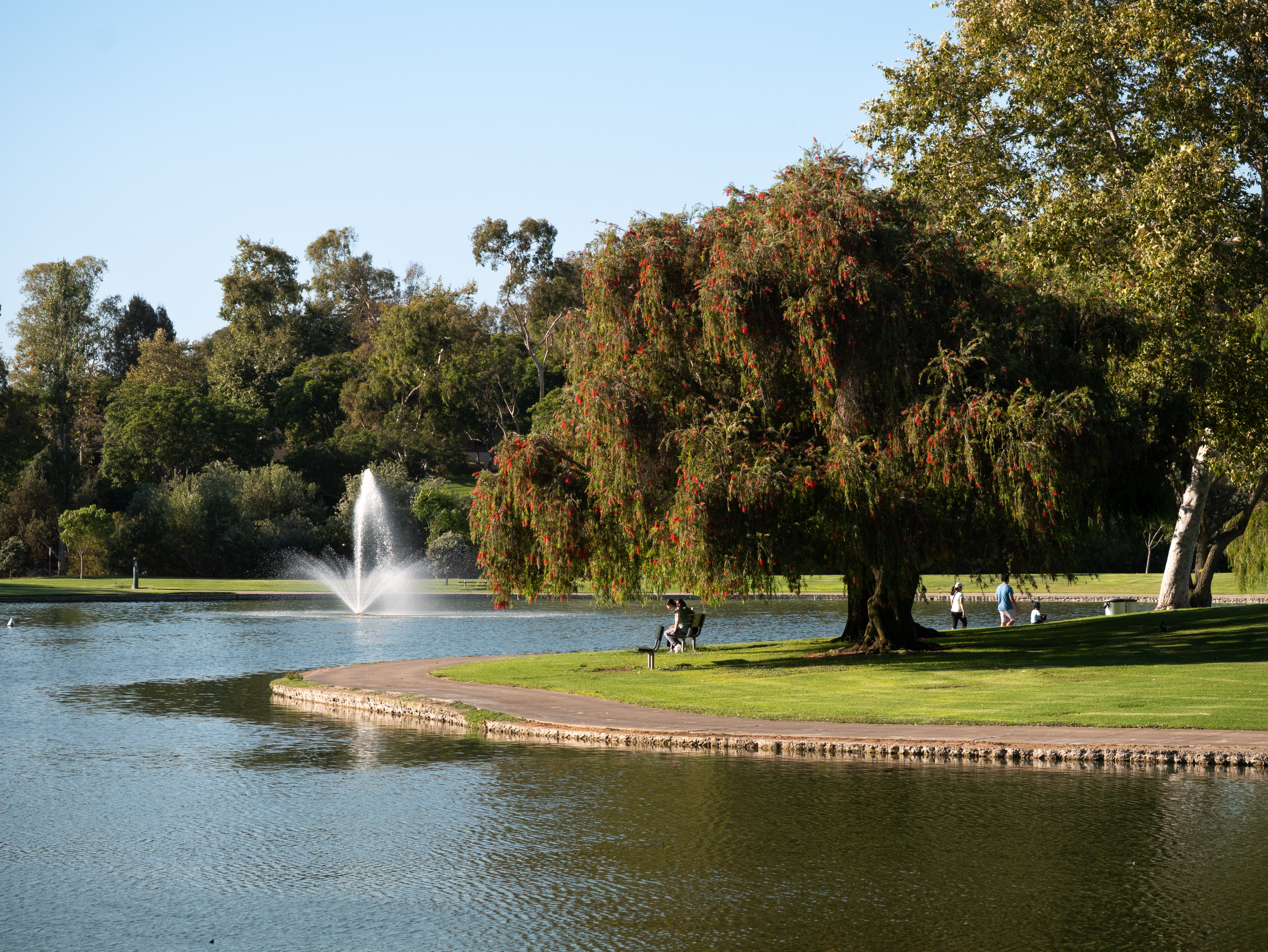
- Interactive map of William R. Mason Regional Park
- Type: Regional park
- Location: Irvine, California, USA
- Coordinates: 33°39′22″N 117°49′54″W
- Website: https://www.ocparks.com/masonpark

William R. Mason Regional Park, or as it is more commonly referred to, Mason Park, is a park in southern Irvine, California. It is one of the largest parks in Irvine and is traversed by trails.

== Background ==
The first phase of the Mason Park, forty-five acres, opened to public use in 1973. A 50-acre (200,000 m^{2}) second phase was completed in 1978 that included a 9.2-acre (37,000 m^{2}) lake which has proven to be a popular attraction.

Mason Park straddles Culver Drive and is thus split into two parts. The east side of the park is a wilderness area. It features scrub-covered ground, traversed by a bike trail and a small creek. As it is located on the northern edge of the San Joaquin Hills, the terrain is rugged: the south edge is a large palisade, marking the edge of the park. The west side of Mason Park is more like a typical park than the east side. Though a ring of wilderness surrounds this side, it is mostly flat grassland, with an occasional hill or rise. An artificial lake about 900 ft (270 m) wide and 800 ft (240 m) long in the center of the park is often home to migrating birds and other local wildlife.

The park is named for former Irvine Company President William R. Mason, who headed the company from 1966 until his death at 54 in 1973.

Its numerous trails eventually lead to Ridgeline, a street that connects Turtle Rock Loop to University Drive.

== See also ==
- Irvine, California
