= Premier Office Centers =

American office rental company

Premier Office Centers LLC, doing business as Premier Workspaces (formerly Premier Business Centers) is a privately held executive suite and office rental company. The company, which was founded in 2002, is one of the largest providers of private offices, meeting rooms rentals, virtual office rental and coworking spaces in the United States. Premier Office Centers is headquartered in Irvine, California and operates with locations in Arizona, Colorado, Washington D.C., Florida, Hawaii, Illinois, Nevada, Ohio, and Texas.
