= Jeffrey Open Space =

Parks in Irvine, California, United States

- Location within southern California
- Location: Jeffrey Road; Irvine, California, United States
- Coordinates: 33°42′14″N 117°45′13″W
- Area: 96 acres (39 ha)
- Operator: City of Irvine

Jeffrey Open Space and the Jeffrey Open Space Trail within it comprise a 96-acre area of parks and trails in Irvine, California. Approximately five miles in length, it primarily follows Jeffrey Road spanning nearly the entire city, from just past Portola Parkway in the north to the Quail Hill open space in the south for 5 miles (8.0 km).

Through a series of community meetings, Jeffrey Open Space was commissioned to be a centerpiece greenspace through the heart of Irvine, providing amenities to residents and visitors and connecting with other parks and trails at multiple points. Serving several communities developed by the Irvine Company, the park design was commissioned to SWA Group landscape architects and was completed in stages in the mid-1990s.

== Design and awards ==
Jeffrey Open Space has been voted one of Orange County's most popular parks, and won the Southern California Chapter Honor Award of the American Society of Landscape Architects in 2009.

SWA Group's concept relies on classic landscape design principles of the venerated designer Frederick Law Olmsted: simple, beautiful grading and plant massing along with creation of a sequential series of spaces. The native, rustic character of the planting material enhances the experience not only for trail users but also for daily commuters driving down Jeffrey Road. The design is meant to provide a fresh sense of place contrasting with the typical “clipped-lawn” character common to much of Orange County.
