= Western Mutual Insurance Group =

American group of property and casualty insurance companies

- Type: Mutual
- Industry: Insurance
- Founded: 1942 (84 years ago)
- Headquarters: Irvine, California, U.S.
- Key people: Joe Crail – president and chief executive officer (since 1974)
- Services: Property and casualty insurance
- Website: westernmutual.com

The Western Mutual Insurance Group is an American group of property and casualty insurance companies, made up of Western Mutual Insurance Company, its sister company Residence Mutual Insurance Company, and Arizona Home Insurance Company (an Arizona-based insurer owned by Western Mutual).

Based in Irvine, California, the group writes direct property and casualty insurance in Arizona, California, Colorado, New Mexico, Nevada, Utah and Texas for preferred homeowners. The Western Mutual Insurance Group has a financial strength rating of 'A' (Excellent) by A.M. Best, a Nationally Recognized Statistical Rating Organization (NRSRO) by the United States Securities and Exchange Commission.

== History ==
Western Mutual was incorporated under the laws of California on March 7, 1942, as a county mutual fire insurer with the title Coast Mutual Fire Insurance Company of Los Angeles County. It commenced business on April 30, 1942. Residence Mutual Insurance Company was founded in 1949. On June 27, 1973, amended articles of incorporation changed the form of operation to that of a general mutual insurance company with multiple line authority and the present title of Western Mutual was adopted. The group expanded from California to writing insurance in Nevada and Colorado in 2002. In 2005, Arizona Home Insurance Company was purchased and incorporated into the group, writing policies solely in Arizona while the group continued to expand into Utah and New Mexico. The group began writing new construction home business in Texas with its builder agents in 2007.

== Company structure ==
Management of the company is under the direction of president and chief executive officer Joe Crail, who has held these positions since 1974. The company is based in Irvine, California, with offices in Phoenix, Arizona; Las Vegas, Nevada; and San Antonio, Texas; with claims adjusters located throughout the states in which business is written.

== Arizona Home Insurance Company ==
Arizona Home Insurance Company has been writing direct homeowners, dwelling fire, earthquake, and allied lines insurance for preferred homeowners in the state of Arizona for more than 30 years. While the company is part of the Western Mutual Insurance Group, Arizona Home Insurance writes only in Arizona, with an office in Scottsdale and claims adjusters employed throughout the state of Arizona.

== Products ==
The Group provides homeowners, dwelling fire, condominium, flood, and earthquake insurance throughout the southwestern United States.

== Ratings ==
On April 4, 2023, A.M. Best rated the Western Mutual Insurance Group A (Excellent).
