= Stanbridge University =

Private for-profit university in California

- Type: Private for-profit university
- Established: 1996
- President: Yasith Weerasuriya
- Students: 1,800
- Location: California, United States; 33°40′43.81″N 117°51′26.13″W
- Colors: Blue
- Mascot: Great horned owl
- Website: www.stanbridge.edu

Stanbridge University is a private for-profit university in California with locations in Irvine, Alhambra, Riverside, and San Marcos. The university offers education in nursing and allied health in Orange County, Los Angeles County, Riverside County, San Diego County, and online. It is accredited by the Accrediting Commission for Career Schools and Colleges, ACCSC.

== History ==
The university was founded in 1996 and changed its name to Stanbridge University in 2017. Stanbridge University offers undergraduate and graduate programs in nursing, physical therapy, and occupational therapy.

Stanbridge University's flagship campus is located in Irvine, California. In 2018, Stanbridge University opened its branch campus in Alhambra, CA in Los Angeles County. The Riverside campus received approval from ACCSC and opened in 2021. The newest branch campus is located in San Marcos, California in San Diego County.

== Approvals, accreditations, and certifications ==
Stanbridge University has been accredited by the Accrediting Commission for Career Schools and Colleges, ACCSC since 2004. Stanbridge University is authorized as an educational institution to award programs of instruction by the State of California Bureau for Private Postsecondary Education.

The entry-level occupational therapy master's degree program at the Orange County, Los Angeles, and Riverside campuses are accredited by the Accreditation Council for Occupational Therapy Education. The Occupational Therapy Assistant program is accredited by ACOTE in Orange County and Los Angeles.

The Bachelor of Science in Nursing degree is accredited by the Commission on Collegiate Nursing Education.

The Bachelor of Science in Nursing degree is approved by the California Board of Registered Nurses at the Orange County, Los Angeles and the Riverside Campuses. The program at the San Diego, San Marcos campus is pending BRN approval.

The Physical Therapist Assistant program at the Orange County and Los Angeles campuses is accredited by the Commission on Accreditation in Physical Therapy Education.

The Associate of Occupational Science in Vocational Nursing program is approved by the California Board of Vocational Nursing and Psychiatric Technicians (BVNPT) at the Orange County, Los Angeles, Riverside, and San Marcos campuses.
