= MindFire, Inc =

American company

- Type: Private
- Industry: Computer software Marketing
- Founded: 1999
- Headquarters: Irvine, California, USA
- Key people: Moe Farsheed, CEO
- Products: LookWho’sClicking; MarketFire
- Website: www.mindfireinc.com

MindFire Inc. is an American private company headquartered in Irvine, California. It provides personalized URLs and landing page technology to the graphic arts and marketing communication industries.

MindFire's main product, LookWho’sClicking, is a web-based application that simplifies the creation, management and tracking of personalized URLs, VIP landing pages, pay per click (PPC) and mass media landing pages, as well as automated follow-up email and real-time reporting.

The company typically delivers LookWho’sClicking through print service providers, agencies, and consultants. MindFire headquarters are in Southern California, but the company also has offices in Idaho, New Jersey, New York, Arizona and Asia-Pacific.

== History ==
MindFire Inc. was started in 1999 by Moe Farsheed (CEO) and Dave Rosendahl (EVP Operations). They partnered with companies like First American who were looking for better ways to track information about the demographics of their clients, and Cal State Fullerton's Institute for Economic and Environmental Studies who wanted to research the regional economy and environment. In 2005, MindFire changed their approach and began selling to print service providers, who were then able to offer the software to their clients. Partners that integrate MindFire services into their software offerings include Hewlett Packard, Kodak, and Canon.

== Software ==
LookWho’sClicking software tracks response and online activity, gathering information about the recipients’ preferences, automatically routing leads to the appropriate salesperson by email, and generating reports that provide real-time insight into how the campaign is doing.

LookWho’sClicking has four workflows (known as campaign blueprints)—the Attract Blueprint, the Click-Capture Blueprint, the Hand Off Blueprint, and the Attract Express Blueprint.

The Attract Blueprint is used with personalized URLs, the Click-Capture Blueprint is used with PPC advertising, the Hand Off Blueprint attracts users to the page and then transfers them to a third-party website, and the Attract Express is similar to Click-Capture, but uses other types of mass media such as television or radio to reach their audience.

== Awards ==
- Inc. 500 – No. 327 – Fastest Growing Private Companies – 2009
- Inc. 500 – No. 20 – Fastest Growing Software Companies – 2009
- Print09 – Must See 'Ems Recognition for MarketFire – 2009
- Inc. 500 – No. 152 – Fastest Growing Private Companies – 2008
- Inc. 500 – No. 6 – Fast Growing Software Companies – 2008

== Philanthropy ==
In 2008, MindFire, Inc. along with Hewlett Packard, co-sponsored a Corazón Project Day after the 2008 DSCOOP annual conference in San Diego. Many attendees of the DSCOOP conference chose to stay an extra day in order to go down to Tecate, Mexico and build a house for a needy family. MindFire and Hewlett Packard both made contributions to pay for the materials needed to build the home.
