= Irvine Bean and Growers Association Building =

- U.S. National Register of Historic Places
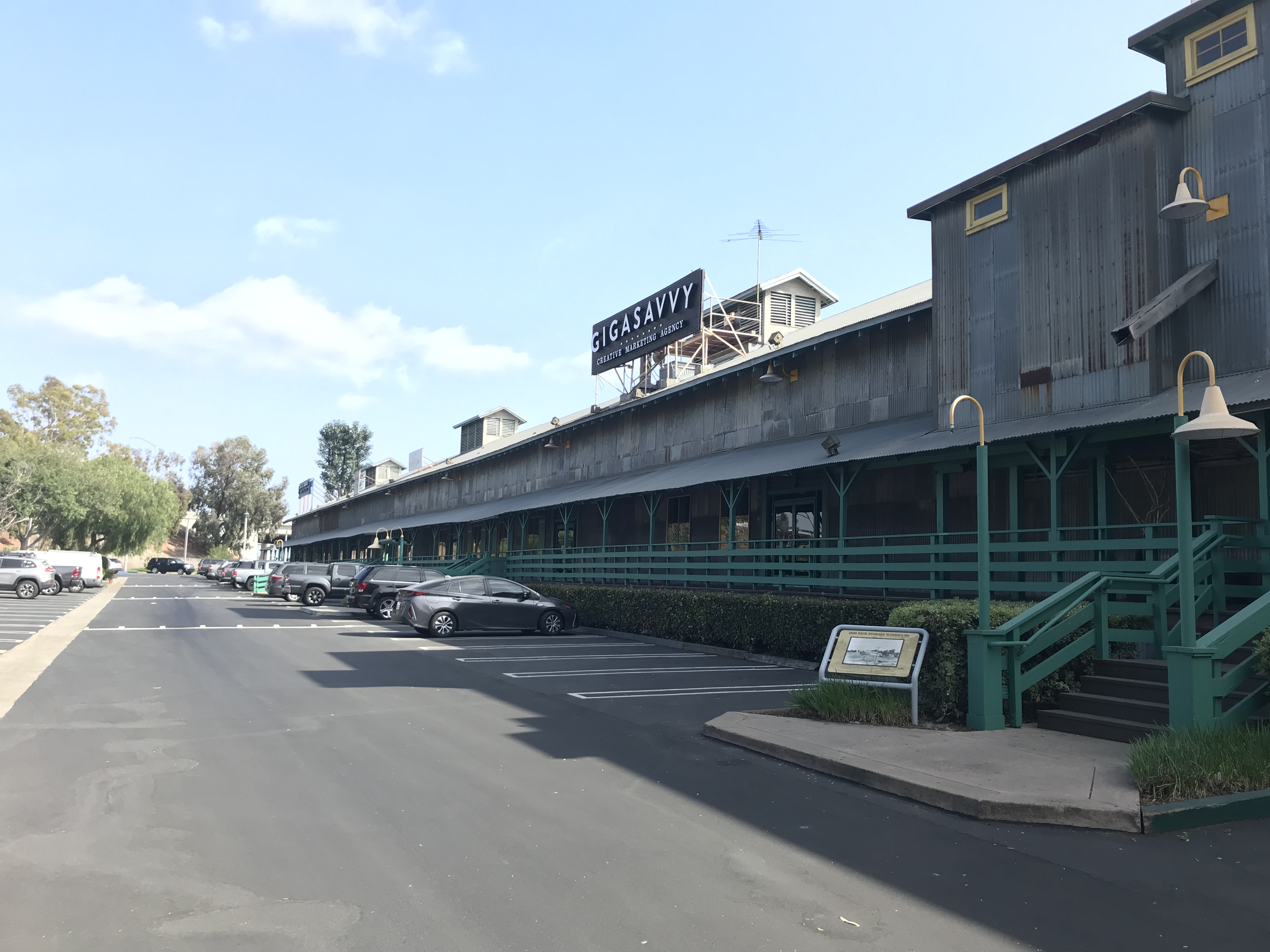
- Southern half of building

- Location within California
- Location: 14972 Sand Canyon Ave., Irvine, California
- Coordinates: 33°40′29″N 117°45′25″W
- Area: 0.1 acres (0.040 ha)
- Built: 1895
- Built by: Unknown
- Architectural style: Boom-town Style
- NRHP reference No.: 86000068
- Added to NRHP: January 13, 1986

Irvine Bean and Growers Association Building, sometimes referred to as the Sack Storage Warehouse or the Bean Warehouse Building, at 14952 Sand Canyon Ave. in Irvine, California, was built in 1895. It was listed on the National Register of Historic Places in 1986. It was used as a storage facility for trains on the tracks directly to the west of the building. It could up to 200,000 sacks of 100 pounds each holding lima, garbanzo, black-eyed beans, barley, or oats.

The building measures 450 feet long and 40 feet wide. Inside the warehouse was two fumigation rooms which could hold up to 500 sacks which took a full day to fumigate. Today, it is split into a multi-use development. With the northern half being used as a hotel and the southern half for office space.
