= W. Brown & Associates =

- Industry: insurance
- Founded: 1987; 39 years ago
- Founder: William Brown
- Headquarters: Irvine, California

W. Brown & Associates (WBAIS) is an independently owned Wholesale Insurance Broker and Managing General Agent (MGA), headquartered in Irvine California. Founded by a group led by William Brown in 1987, the company's initial market was Aviation insurance, however over time W. Brown & Associates expanded into the adjacent Property and Casualty insurance market in addition to its aviation insurance products.

== Aviation ==
In 1999, W. Brown & Associates agreed to the terms of a partnership with XL Insurance to produce general aviation insurance on their behalf. This partnership lasted until 2009.

In 2009, W. Brown & Associates entered an exclusive multi-year partnership with Catlin Insurance to underwrite general aviation business throughout the United States on their behalf.

== Property & Casualty ==
=== History ===
W. Brown & Associates Property & Casualty Insurance Services was established in 1988 with the following Business Groups: General Liability, Property, Professional Liability, Personal Lines, Earthquake, & Pollution. In 1991 W. Brown & Associates established a Transportation Department.

In 2007, Business Insurance named W. Brown & Associates the sixth largest Property & Casualty Managing General Agent in the United States based on written premiums of $220,000,000 for the year.

In May 2010, W. Brown & Associates acquired Vulcan E&S.

=== Trade Organizations ===
W. Brown & Associates is a member of the American Association of Managing General Agents which represents members' interests before the federal, state and local governmental and regulatory agencies. Additionally, W. Brown & Associates is a member of the National Association of Surplus Lines Offices.

== Charitable Giving ==
W. Brown has given to the following: The Insurance Industry Charitable Foundation (IICF). Derek Hughes Educational Foundation.
