= Irvine Blacksmith Shop =

- U.S. National Register of Historic Places
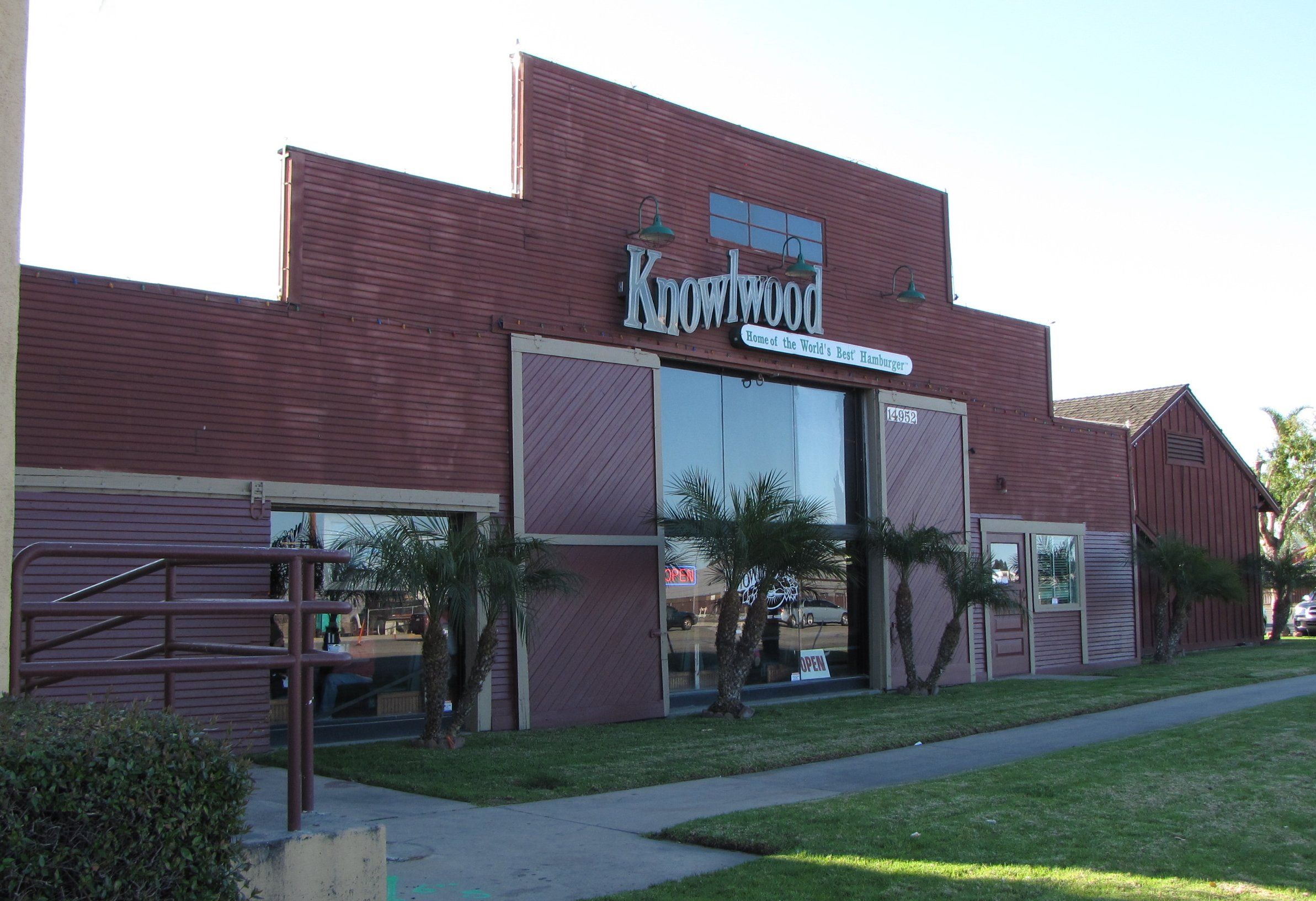
- Front of building

- Location within California
- Location: 14952 Sand Canyon Ave., Irvine, California
- Coordinates: 33°40′34″N 117°45′29″W
- Area: 0.1 acres (0.040 ha)
- Built: 1915
- Built by: Irvine Co.
- Architectural style: Boom-town Style
- NRHP reference No.: 86000452
- Added to NRHP: March 20, 1986

Irvine Blacksmith Shop, at 14952 Sand Canyon Ave. in Irvine, California, was built in 1915-16 by the Irvine Company. It was listed on the National Register of Historic Places in 1986.

It has a utilitarian style generally and a Western false front, with a wide step-down parapet. It is constructed from wood frame and wood posts, with narrow-lap siding, and is 60 by 62 feet (18 m × 19 m) in plan.

The blacksmith shop was converted to a restaurant, Knowlwood Restaurant, in 1989.
