= John Quoc Duong =

American politician (born 1973)

- John Quốc Dương
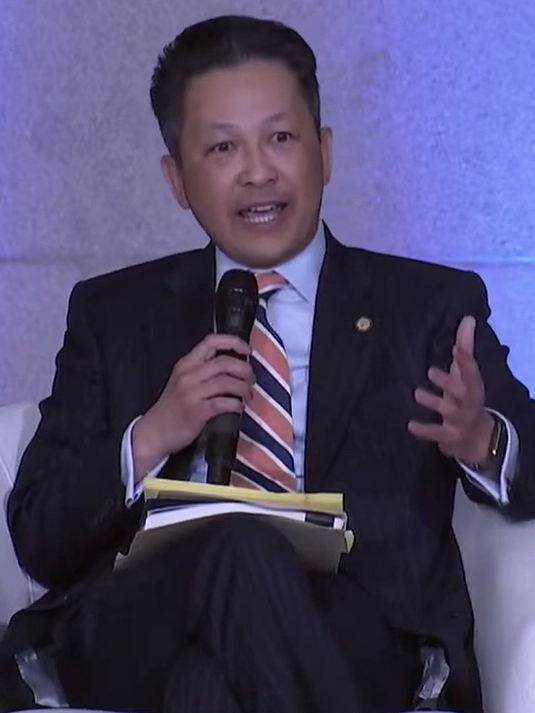
- Duong in 2024

White House Initiative on Asian Americans and Pacific Islanders

Executive director
- In office June 1, 2001 – 2003

Personal details
- Born: 1973 (age 52–53) Vietnam
- Party: Republican
- Children: 2
- Education: University of California, Riverside (BA); University of California, Irvine (MBA)
- Occupation: Businessman; politician

John Quoc Duong (born 1973) is a Vietnamese American businessman and politician. From 2001 to 2003, Duong served as the executive director of the White House Initiative on Asian Americans and Pacific Islanders. In 2006, Duong ran for mayor of Irvine, California, ultimately losing to incumbent Beth Krom.

A Vietnamese immigrant, Duong initially served as an aide to California governor Pete Wilson from 1996 to 1999. After Wilson's tenure, Duong became vice president of Bridgecreek Development and founded the consulting firm Q-Strategies. During the 2000 US presidential election, he served as California finance chairman of Asian Americans for Bush, later becoming an elected delegate at the RNC.

== Early life and education ==
In 1973, Duong was born in Vietnam. His father, Dương Văn Mười or Michael Duong, a former national police captain, was sent to a re-education camp, but later escaped by boat, emigrating to the United States in 1981. At the age of eight, as a Vietnamese boat person, Duong spent a week on a small boat in the South China Sea before reaching the United States with his mother in 1982. Duong's mother depended on public assistance and food stamps during her first few months in the US. His father worked in a New Jersey soy sauce factory before moving his family to the San Francisco Bay Area. In San Francisco, Duong's mother studied at secretarial school.

Two years later, the family moved to San Pablo, California. Duong attended Richmond High School, becoming president of its student council and graduating in 1991. Duong was the starting JV quarterback, but quit the team due to conflict with his job as a paper carrier for the West County Times. As a teenager, he worked a dishwasher in San Francisco restaurants.

Later, he attended University of California, Davis, initially majoring in computer programming before switching to political science and public service, later graduating with a B.A. in 1996. In college, Duong was president of the Vietnamese Students Association. In 1994, he worked as an intern for California governor Pete Wilson's office.

== Career ==
=== Aide to Pete Wilson ===
After graduating college, Duong continued serving various roles in Wilson's administration from 1996 to 1999; his latest position was as deputy director of community affairs. He served the role of liaison between Wilson and various Asian communities: he acted as the governor's spokesperson for California-based Asian newspapers and planned educational programs raising awareness for state services.

=== Real estate and consulting ===
After Wilson completed his two terms as governor, Duong entered the real estate industry and became vice president of Bridgecreek Development in January 1999, a real estate development firm owned by Frank Jao. In 1999, Duong founded Q-Strategies, a consulting firm targeting small businesses. Duong served as a board member for the Contra Costa College Foundation, Contra Costa County Workforce Development Board, America Viet League, and Vietnamese American Council. He was also a member of the California Commonwealth Club, Richmond-San Pablo Exchange Club, and Vietnamese American Public Affairs Committee.

=== 2000 US presidential election ===
During the 2000 presidential election, he served as the California finance chairman of Asian Americans for Bush. At the Republican National Convention, Duong served as an elected delegate for Bush for the 7^{th} congressional district in the San Francisco Bay Area.

=== White House Initiative on Asian Americans and Pacific Islanders ===
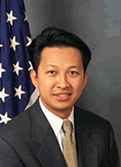
Duong's official portrait as executive director

On June 1, 2001, Duong was appointed the executive director of the White House Initiative on Asian Americans and Pacific Islanders. Upon being appointed, he intended to focus on health issues affecting Asian Americans such as suicide and cervical cancer. He ultimately left the role in mid 2003 after assisting in the first "comprehensive study on the status of health in the Asian-Pacific community".

=== Subsequent developments ===
After two years in Washington, Duong returned with his family to California, settling in Irvine, California. He continued his work with Bridgecreek Development, becoming executive vice president. He also received an Executive MBA from University of California, Irvine’s Paul Merage School of Business.

=== 2006 Irvine mayoral campaign ===
On August 14, 2006, Duong announced his candidacy for mayor of Irvine. Later, in August 17, Duong was appointed as a commissioner in the city of Irvine's Finance Commission by councilmember Steven Choi. Duong sent mailers raising concerns of incumbent mayor Beth Krom's refusal in recognizing Taiwan in a signed document while on a visit to a sister city in China. In November, Duong ultimately lost the election to Krom by 20 points.

== Personal life ==
He is married to Vicki Vi and has two children. As of 2006, Duong and his family resided in the neighborhood of West Irvine, Irvine, California.

== Electoral history ==
2006 Irvine mayoral election
| Candidate | Votes | % |
|---|---|---|
| Beth Crom | 18,613 | 60.0 |
| John Quoc Duong | 12,434 | 40.0 |
