= Larry Agran =

American politician (born 1945)

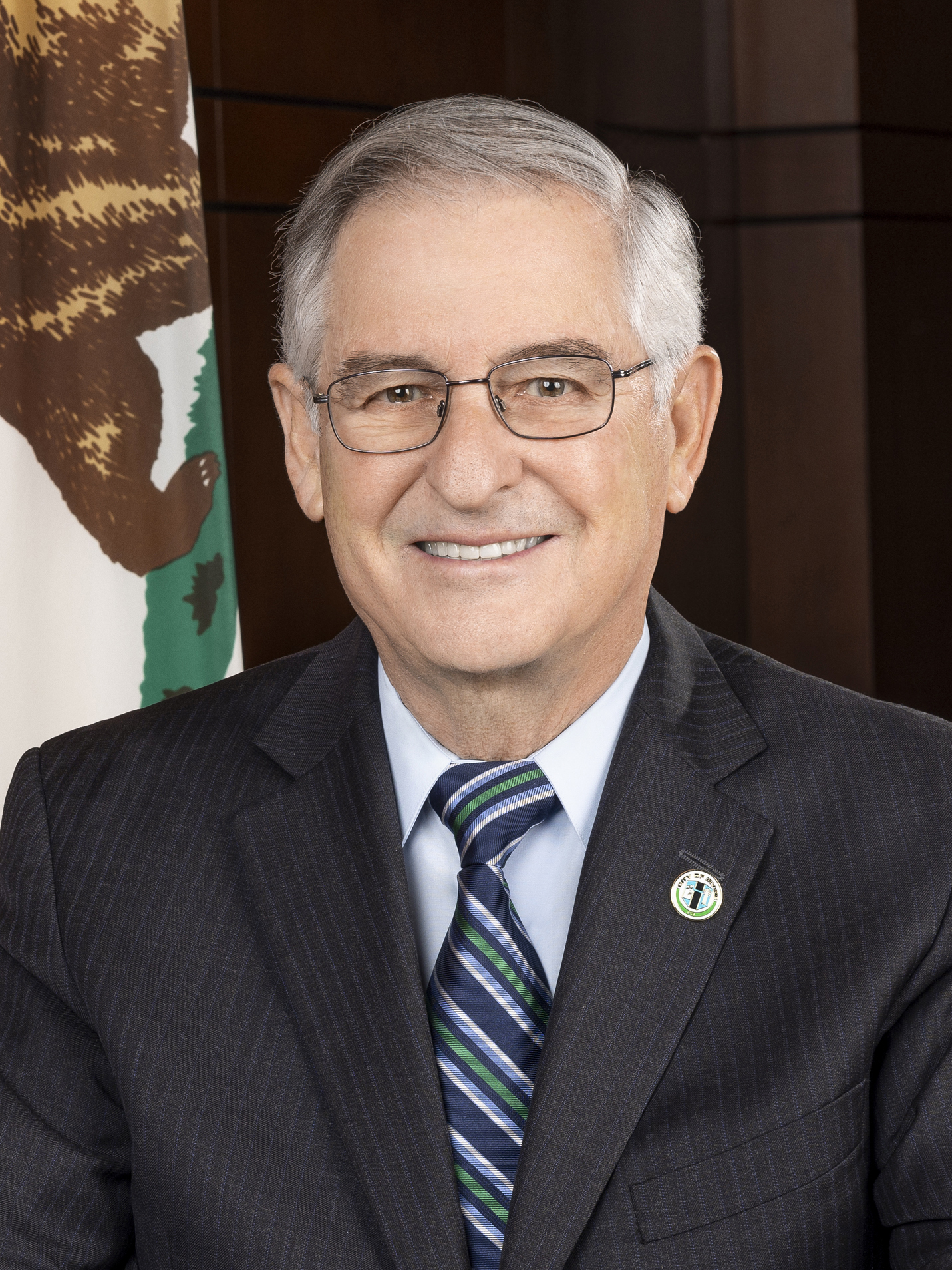
- Official portrait, 2025

Mayor of Irvine
- Incumbent
- Assumed office December 10, 2024
- Preceded by: Farrah Khan
- In office November 7, 2000 – December 14, 2004
- Preceded by: Christina Shea
- Succeeded by: Beth Krom
- In office July 8, 1986 – July 20, 1990
- Preceded by: C. David Baker
- Succeeded by: Sally Anne Sheridan
- In office July 13, 1982 – July 10, 1984
- Preceded by: David Sills
- Succeeded by: David Sills

Personal details
- Born: Lawrence Alan Agran; February 2, 1945 (age 81) Chicago, Illinois, U.S.
- Party: Democratic
- Education: University of California, Berkeley (BS); Harvard University (JD)

Lawrence Alan Agran (born February 2, 1945) is an American lawyer and the current mayor of Irvine, California. Born in Chicago, Agran graduated from UC Berkeley and Harvard Law School. He is the city's longest serving mayor and elected official, having been elected to the city council in 1978.

As mayor, he advocated for banning CFCs, preservation of nature areas, and suburban preservationism. He won the 2024 mayor election with 39% of the vote, and the 2026 mayor election with 69.7%.

== Early life and education ==
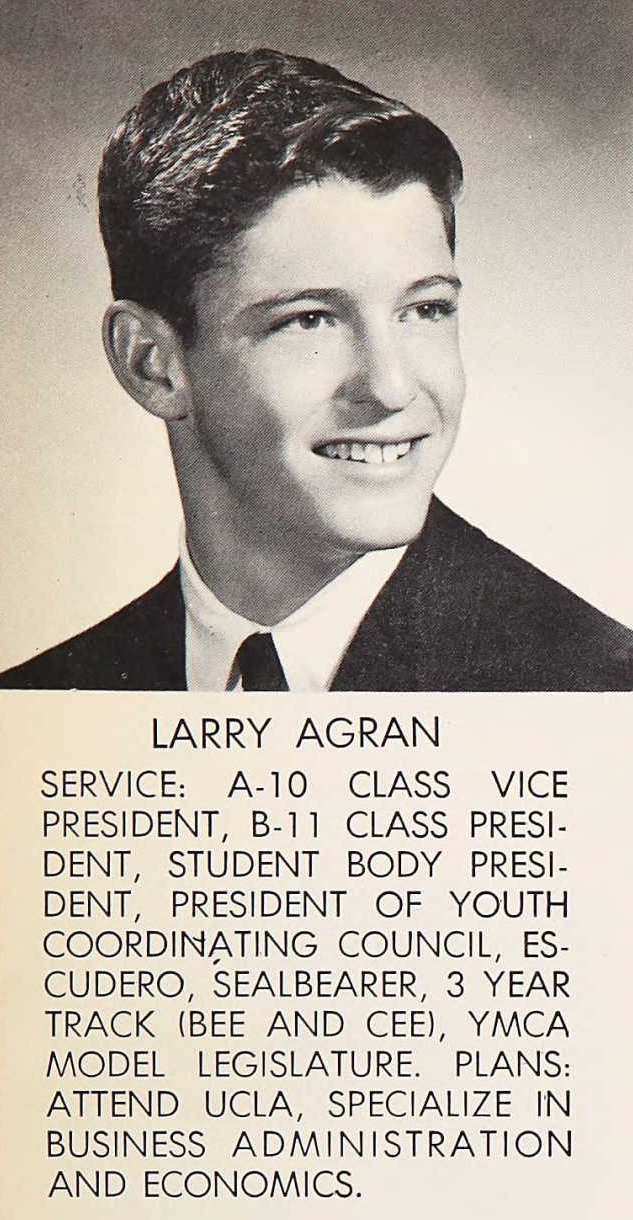
Agran in the North Hollywood High School yearbook, 1962

Agran was born in Chicago, the son of Selma Elizabeth (Meyerson) and Reuben Agran (originally "Agranowsky"). He was raised in a "politically liberal Jewish household". He grew up in North Hollywood, Los Angeles and was a baseball player as a child. He later attended North Hollywood High School where he played as a quarterback.

Agran graduated Phi Beta Kappa from the University of California, Berkeley in 1966 with a Bachelor of Science degree in both history and economics. Agran in 1965, together with Peter and Nacy Madian, lobbied the California Public Utilities Commission for permission to run a holiday bus service between UC Berkeley and San Francisco International Airport, but were denied.

He then earned a juris doctor (with honors) from Harvard Law School in 1969, specializing in public interest law.

He served in the United States Army Reserve from 1962 to 1970.

Agran served as legal counsel to the California State Senate Committee on Health and Welfare and taught legislation and public policy at the UCLA School of Law and the University of California, Irvine Graduate School of Management.

== City government, 1978–1990 ==
=== Elected service between 1978 and 1990 ===
Between 1978 and 1990, Larry Agran served on the Irvine City Council, including six years as mayor (Irvine employs a council-manager government).

By 1978, Larry Agran had become an active member of various community organizations and was a local attorney. Agran supported increased class integration and the use of federal funding for moderate-income housing in Irvine. Agran's calls for the use of zoning and changes to Irvine's general plan to slow the pace of suburban sprawl and protect open space gained him considerable support from the influential citizen group Irvine Tomorrow, which initiated a door-to-door campaign that helped elect Agran to one of two open seats on the Irvine City Council. Larry Agran won the most votes in his first election for Irvine City Council on March 7, 1978, being elected to his first four-year term in Irvine's City Council.

Larry Agran won the most votes again in the regular municipal election on June 8, 1982, and first served as mayor of Irvine in 1982, continuing through 1984, with a second term starting in 1986. Agran garnered support in the 1986 election by calling for restraints on excessive growth in the city and the preservation of hillsides and farmlands, as well as arguing against new freeways in the Irvine area and advocating for the withdrawal of the city from the Transportation Corridor Agencies. In 1988, Agran won the first-ever direct-election for mayor in Irvine. In 1990, Agran was recognized as an elected Democratic Socialists of America "DSAer" by Democratic Left magazine. He lost reelection in the subsequent 1990 Irvine mayoral election.

==== Municipal diplomacy ====
In 1983, then-Mayor Agran established the Local Elected Officials of America (LEO-USA) project, which founded what became a network of over 250 U.S. local officials advocating for municipal priorities that had an international scope, including the end of the arms race, reduction in U.S. defense spending, and the prioritizing of increased federal spending in economically disadvantaged American cities. Meanwhile, in 1982, the non-profit Center for Innovative Diplomacy (CID) was established in San Francisco by Michael Shuman to advocate for citizen diplomacy and local government action to end the nuclear arms race. The organizations prioritized support for the 1981 Nuclear Weapons Freeze Campaign. Eventually, the organizations aimed at broader diplomatic issues, including sanctuary cities and sister cities in Central America. In the last decade of the Cold War, the networks grew to over 6,000 local officials and activists. CID and LEO-USA merged, under the CID name, and its headquarters moved to Irvine. The merger was followed by the foundation of the Bulletin of Municipal Foreign Policy, a journal that focused on the "municipal foreign policy movement." In 2019, Agran worked with University of California, Irvine doctoral student Ben Leffel to chronicle the role Irvine had to play in establishing CID/LEO-USA its municipal foreign policy network, using original issues of the Bulletin, with articles largely written by the Center's expansive network.

In 1989, Agran implemented the first city-level CFC ban in the country (see below) and is credited with starting "the world’s largest international environmental city government network, ICLEI – Local Governments for Sustainability (formerly, International Council for Local Environmental Initiatives)." In September 2020, Larry Agran was recognized by ICLEI as playing a crucial role in founding the international organization that now includes over 1,750 cities, towns, and counties in 84 countries:

Indeed, the stirrings of a city-led sustainability network can be traced in part to City of Irvine, CA, where, in summer 1989, then-Mayor Larry Agran ushered a first-of-its-kind local ordinance restricting the use of ozone-depleting chlorofluorocarbons (CFCs). Mayor Agran predicted other cities would follow and they did. By July, a two-day conference in Irvine convened 24 U.S. and Canadian cities to explore how local governments could combat the depletion of the ozone layer. They called themselves the North American Congress of Local Governments for a Stratospheric Protection Accord. City of Irvine’s national and global peers transitioned their scope beyond CFCs to consider all environmental pollution the following year during the UN conference mentioned above.

A digital archive was created at the University of California, Irvine of CID's work, as well as the founding of ICLEI.

==== Human rights ordinance ====
As Mayor in 1988, Larry Agran led the Irvine City Council to establish the first human rights ordinance of its kind in Orange County, prohibiting discrimination on basis of "race, color, religion, national origin, sex, age, marital status, physical handicap," as well as sexual orientation. The city ordinance was patterned on state and federal law, but went further to protect against discrimination based on sexual orientation. The Irvine City Council voted 4-0 to pass the ordinance.

In 1989, a ballot measure (Measure N), led by Christina Shea and her husband, struck "sexual orientation" as a protected class from the human rights ordinance. In June 2020, the initiative was repealed by a unanimous vote of the Irvine City Council.

==== Municipal action on chlorofluorocarbons ====
Agran, Rowland and Molina, championed what was described as one of "the most far reaching measures" in banning commercial process and consumer product use of CFCs. The ordinance is recognized as jumpstarting municipal, state, national, and international efforts to craft legislation that banned CFCs.

== 1992 presidential campaign ==
In 1992, Agran unsuccessfully sought the Democratic Party nomination for president. He proposed removing all United States troops from Western Europe and Japan and redirecting 150 billion dollars as a "peace dividend" (1992 value) to local cities and towns for local services such as "public health clinics, libraries, police forces, and transportation", a national health program, and environmental protections.

Despite holding only a local office and being unknown outside California, in a poll on January 22, 1992, he tied with two well-known national politicians: Senator Tom Harkin of Iowa and former California governor Jerry Brown.

According to Carole Florman, organizer of the Global Warming Leadership Forum in Tallahassee in February (in which Agran participated), "the audience was more enthusiastic about Larry Agran than about Bill Clinton". At a debate at Lehman College on 31 March 1992, Agran was arrested after calling out from the audience to be included.

Agran performed poorly in the New Hampshire primary, but did pick up modest support in later primaries as a protest candidate with appeal to those unhappy with the other candidates. He received three votes at the 1992 Democratic National Convention.

Agran was excluded from every television debate, along with some other minor candidates, such as Eugene McCarthy.

== City government, 1998–present ==
=== Return to city government in 1998 ===
In 1998, Agran re-entered public service as an Irvine City Councillor.

He was again elected mayor in the 2000 election (in which he was unopposed), and in 2002. He later, unsuccessfully, sought the mayoralty in 2012.

Agran rejoined the city council in 2004 and has, for many years, served as a councilor, being most recently re-elected in 2020. He chaired the city's Great Park board until February 2011. (The board is charged with planning, constructing and operating a new park of nearly 1,500 acres (6.1 km^{2}) at the former Marine Corps Air Base El Toro in Irvine.)

==== Orange County Great Park ====
As an Irvine City Councilmember, Agran was the chair of the board of directors of the Orange County Great Park project from 2004 to 2010, establishing an international Great Park Master Design Competition that selected landscape architect Ken Smith of New York to create a master design and plan for the 40-year build-out of the Great Park.

Agran supervised removal and clean-up of decades of toxic contamination and building of many of the Great Park's iconic features, including the Great Park Balloon and Carousel, the Palm Court and Arts Complex, the Farm + Food Lab, the South Lawn Soccer Complex, the huge North Lawn (the largest uninterrupted lawn in Southern California), and restoration and repurposing of historic World War II airplane hangars. Under Agran's leadership, the Great Park also began hosting popular events, including Cirque du Soleil, concerts, movies, air shows, regular farmers markets, and countless other community events, boosting attendance at the Great Park to nearly one million annual visitors. Under Agran's tenure, the City of Irvine and the Orange County Great Park also won a national U.S. Department of Energy competition to be the host venue for two U.S. Solar Decathlons, which were ultimately held at the Great Park in 2013 and 2015. Annual financial audits of the Great Park conducted from 2004 through 2010 consistently found that the project was properly managed and that all spending was properly authorized, with no significant irregularities or unaccounted-for funds.

In 2012, the development of the Great Park became politicized. Political opponents of Agran — including newly-elected Mayor Steven Choi and Councilmembers Christina Shea and Jeff Lalloway — won a 3-2 majority on the City Council, and called for another audit of Great Park expenditures. Agran and the other members of the City Council voted for the new audit, specifying that the cost should not exceed $250,000. Councilmembers Christina Shea and Jeff Lalloway were appointed by the city council to a newly constituted City Council Subcommittee charged with overseeing the audit. The committee hired an accounting firm to conduct the audit: Hagen, Streiff, Newton & Oshiro (HSNO).

In January 2014, HSNO issued a preliminary public report declaring that $38 million in Great Park funds were "missing." The funds were, in fact, sitting in a secure state-mandated housing set-aside account.

The budget for the Great Park audit increased from the original $250,000 that had been authorized to $1.7 million to conduct additional investigations into the Great Park.

These expenditures drew the attention of the Joint Legislative Audit Committee of the California State Legislature, which ordered California State Auditor Elaine Howle to conduct a careful review of the entire Great Park audit and the work of the Shea Subcommittee. That review culminated in California State Auditor Report 2015-116, titled "Poor Governance of the $1.7 Million Review of the Orange County Great Park Needlessly Compromised the Review's Credibility." The California State Auditor's report states that the HSNO was hired through a flawed and biased selection process that "cast doubt on the impartiality of Irvine's selection of HSNO as the park review consultant and increased the risk that the city did not select the most qualified vendor to meet its needs." This bidding process all but ensured that HSNO would receive a second, "no-bid" contract. The report is also critical of the Shea Subcommittee's failure to properly oversee the work of the outside firms hired to conduct the audit, noting that the audit itself was driven by political motivations rather than by an objective analysis of the readily-available financial data.

In January 2020, the accounting firm hired by the Shea Subcommittee — Hagen, Streiff, Newton & Oshiro (HSNO) — was ordered to surrender their accountancy license and paid $550,000 in costs and penalties when the California Board of Accountancy said that the firm "failed to comply with professional standards, engaged in numerous acts of negligence, and disseminated false and misleading information" in performing the Great Park audit.

==== Irvine term limits ====
In 2014, Irvine voters had approved a rule to its city charter such that councilmembers and the mayors can serve no more than two full 2 year terms for life. Agran argued against the term limits, calling it the "worst written term limits proposal in history" in a statement on the 2014 ballot, saying that it was a bid by then-Mayor Steven Choi to stay in office for eight more years.

Agran is one of the longest serving city council members in Orange County, having served for over three decades on and off the city council since 1978, alongside serving as mayor for five non-consecutive 2 year terms. In December 2022, Agran had resigned with a week left on his term in order to run for another four years on the city council, which prompted his colleague Vice Mayor Tammy Kim to call it a "slippery power grab" and asking Agran if "40 years on the city council [was] not enough".

== Orange County Veterans Memorial Park and Cemetery Campaigns ==
In July 2014, the Irvine City Council unanimously passed Councilmember Larry Agran's motion to transfer 125-acres (50 hectares) of city-owned land called the Amended and Restated Development Agreement (ARDA) site to the state for development of a Veterans Memorial Park and Cemetery.

A concept plan for the development was released in June 2016. Estimated cost of the facility was $78 million. In April 2017, the Irvine City Council, on a split 3-2 vote, introduced a land-swap alternative with developer Five Point, trading the park-side ARDA site with a similarly sized location near Interstate 405. In June 2017, with another split 3-2 vote, Irvine City Council directed the City to enter the land swap contract with developer Five Point to move the cemetery.

After the Irvine City Council entered the land swap agreement on October 10, 2017, Irvine residents started a petition referendum campaign to halt the zoning ordinance change that was requisite for the land swap, submitting 19,140 signatures gathered within 30 days, which put the zoning change on the June 2018 ballot. The referendum to halt the zoning change was successful, as measure "B", which would have allowed the relocation of the cemetery, was defeated by 63% to 37%.

In July 2018, the Irvine City Council moved to study a third site for the veterans' cemetery, dubbed the "golf course site". Irvine residents initiated a petition initiative, led by Ed Pope and Larry Agran, to designate by zoning the ARDA site to be the only site in the Great Park area to be used for cemetery purposes. Proponents of the initiative to build at the original ARDA site submitted a reported 19,758 signatures to put the initiative on the November 2020 ballot. In May 2020, Irvine City Council voted 4-1 to adopt the initiative as ordinance, designating the ARDA site as the only site in the Great Park area for cemetery uses.

== Personal life ==
Agran met Phyllis Friedman at UC Berkeley in 1964. They were married on 12 June 1966, both at age 21. Their son, Kenneth Agran was born in 1970. Agran lives in the same home in University Park purchased in 1976. His son and grandchildren also reside in Irvine.

== Electoral history ==
=== Municipal ===
==== 2024 Irvine Mayoral Election ====
2024 Irvine Mayoral Election
Candidate	Votes	%
Larry Agran	42,652	38.76
Tammy Kim	37,924	34.46
Ron Scolesdang	12,891	11.71
Liqing Lee Sun	6,001	5.45
Felipe Delgado	5,325	4.84
Akshat Bhatia	2,761	2.51
Wing Chow	2,496	2.27
Total votes	110,050	100.0

==== 2022 Irvine City Council Election ====
2022 Irvine City Council Election
Candidate	Votes	%
Larry Agran	31,023	23.9
Kathleen Treseder	29,440	22.6
Anthony Kuo	27,272	21.0
John Park	24,891	19.1
Scott Hansen	12,481	9.6
Navid Sadigh	4,895	3.8
Total votes	130,002	100

==== 2020 Irvine City Council Election ====
As councilmember Farrah Khan was elected to the office of mayor mid-term, Agran was elected as the third runner-up.

2020 Irvine City Council Election
Candidate	Votes	%
Tammy Kim	43,744	14.8
Mike Carroll	38,615	13.1
Larry Agran	38,156	12.9
Lauren Johnson-Norris	37,931	12.8
John Park	32,521	11.0
Carrie O'Malley	27,440	9.3
Mark Newgent	15,894	5.4
Diana Jiang	14,837	5.0
Laura Bratton	10,305	3.5
Dylan Green	8,814	3.0
Christina Dillard	8,321	2.8
Anshul Garg	6,420	2.2
Abigail Pole	6,406	2.2
Hai Yang Liang	5,944	2.0
Total votes	295,348	100

==== 2014 Irvine City Council Election ====
2014 Irvine City Council Election
Candidate	Votes	%
Lynn Schott	16,814	22.9
Jeffrey Lalloway	16,749	22.8
Melissa Fox	16,539	22.5
Larry Agran	14,403	19.6
Evan Chemers	8,966	12.2
Total votes	73,471	100

==== 2012 Irvine Mayoral Election ====
Although Agran lost this election, he continued to serve on the Irvine City Council through 2014.

2012 Irvine Mayoral Election
Candidate	Votes	%
Steven Choi	32,505	45.7
Larry Agran	28,741	40.4
Katherine Daigle	9,951	13.9
Total votes	71,197	100

==== 2010 Irvine City Council Election ====
2010 Irvine City Council Election
Candidate	Votes	%
Larry Agran	22,206	23.6
Jeffrey Lalloway	20,959	22.3
Lynn Schott	18,630	19.8
Shiva Farivar	17,657	18.8
Chris Moore	8,259	8.8
Bijan Mazarji	3,327	3.5
Yunus Aksoy	3,037	3.2
Total votes	94,075	100

==== 2008 Irvine City Council Election ====
As councilmember Sukhee Kang was elected to the office of mayor mid-term, Agran was elected as the third runner-up.

2008 Irvine City Council Election
Candidate	Votes	%
Beth Krom	36,924	19.5
Steven Choi	28,886	15.3
Larry Agran	28,157	14.9
Margie Wakeham	22,669	12.0
Todd Gallinger	22,423	11.9
Patrick Rodgers	22,093	11.7
Eric Johnson	11,022	5.8
Bea Foster	10,877	5.8
Ruby Roung	3,697	2.0
Paris Merriam	2,354	1.2
Total votes	189,102	100

==== 2004 Irvine City Council Election ====
As councilmember Beth Krom was elected to the office of mayor mid-term, Sukhee Kang was elected as the third runner-up.

2004 Irvine City Council Election
Candidate	Votes	%
Larry Agran	25,210	16.9
Steven Choi	25,052	16.8
Sukhee Kang	24,642	16.5
Debbie Coven	24,261	16.2
Mike House	22,561	15.1
Greg Smith	22,326	14.9
Mohsen Alinaghian	5,336	3.6
Total votes	149,388	100

==== 2002 Irvine Mayoral Election ====
2002 Irvine Mayoral Election
Candidate	Votes	%
Larry Agran	19,886	53.4
Mike House	17,358	46.6
Total votes	37,244	100

==== 2000 Irvine Mayoral Election ====
2000 Irvine Mayoral Election
Candidate	Votes	%
Larry Agran	34,905	100.0
Total votes		100

==== 1998 Irvine City Council Election ====
1998 Irvine City Council Election
Candidate	Votes	%
Larry Agran	14,434	22.4
Greg Smith	13,004	20.2
Ned Kassouf	10,452	16.3
Carolyn McInerney	10,422	16.2
George Michael Gallagher	6,655	10.3
Don Irvine	4,662	7.2
Jack Wu	2,902	4.5
Savvas Roditis	1,776	2.8
Total votes	64,307	100

==== 1990 Irvine Mayoral Election ====
1990 Irvine City Council Election
Candidate	Votes	%
Sally Anne Sheridan	14,256	51.2
Larry Agran	13,584	48.8
Total votes	27,840	100

==== 1988 Irvine Mayoral Election ====
1988 was the first year with direct elections for the position of mayor. Agran was the first directly elected mayor of Irvine.

1988 Irvine City Council Election
Candidate	Votes	%
Larry Agran	15,651	57.0
Barry Hammond	8,707	31.7
Hal Maloney	3,111	11.3
Total votes	27,469	100

==== 1986 Irvine City Council Election ====
1986 Irvine City Council Election
Candidate	Votes	%
Larry Agran	11,056	27.9
Ed Dornan	10,737	27.1
Tom Jones	5,513	13.9
Hal Maloney	5,221	13.2
Jean Hobart	2,822	7.1
Mary Aileen Matheis	1,543	3.9
Gary Steven Bennett	669	1.7
Scott Wellman	607	1.5
Anthony Korba	551	1.4
Betsy Scherr	551	1.4
Clarence Becwar	351	0.9
Total votes	39,621	100

==== 1982 Irvine City Council Election ====
1982 Irvine City Council Election
Candidate	Votes	%
Larry Agran	8,696	27.5
Barbara Wiener	8,295	26.2
John Nakaoka	5,875	18.6
Edward Dornan	5,567	17.6
Bill Pozzi	2,083	6.6
Marjorie Keiser	1,142	3.6
Total votes	31,658	100

==== 1978 Irvine City Council Election ====
1978 Irvine City Council Election
Candidate	Votes	%
Larry Agran	2,742	22.7
Arthur Anthony	2,423	20.0
Ellen Freund	1,885	15.6
Robert Moore	1,859	15.4
C. Larry Hoffman	1,818	15.0
Vivian Hall	1,206	10.0
David Warren	61	0.5
Jerry Shaw	55	0.5
Carol Effenberger	49	0.4
Total votes	12,098	100

=== Presidential ===
==== 1992 Democratic National Convention (delegates) ====
- Bill Clinton – 3,372 (80.27%)
- Jerry Brown – 596 (14.19%)
- Paul Tsongas – 209 (4.98%)
- Robert P. Casey – 10 (0.24%)
- Patricia Schroeder – 8 (0.19%)
- Larry Agran – 3 (0.07%)
- Ron Daniels – 1 (0.02%)
- Al Gore – 1 (0.02%)
- Joe Simonetta 1 (0.02%)

==== 1992 United States presidential election (Democratic primary) ====
- Bill Clinton – 10,482,411 (52.01%)
- Jerry Brown – 4,071,232 (20.20%)
- Paul Tsongas – 3,656,010 (18.14%)
- Unpledged – 750,873 (3.73%)
- Bob Kerrey – 318,457 (1.58%)
- Tom Harkin – 280,304 (1.39%)
- Lyndon LaRouche – 154,599 (0.77%)
- Eugene McCarthy – 108,678 (0.54%)
- Charles Woods – 88,948 (0.44%)
- Larry Agran – 58,611 (0.29%)
- Ross Perot – 54,755 (0.27%)
- Ralph Nader – 35,935 (0.18%)
- Louis Stokes – 29,983 (0.15%)
- Angus Wheeler McDonald – 9,900 (0.05%)
- J. Louis McAlpine – 7,911 (0.04%)
- George W. Benns – 7,887 (0.04%)
- Rufus T. Higginbotham – 7,705 (0.04%)
- Tom Howard Hawks – 7,434 (0.04%)
- Stephen Bruke – 5,261 (0.03%)
- Tom Laughlin – 5,202 (0.03%)
- Tom Shiekman – 4,965 (0.03%)
- Jeffrey F. Marsh – 2,445 (0.01%)
- George Ballard – 2,067 (0.01%)
- Ray Rollinson – 1,206 (0.01%)
- Lenora Fulani – 402 (0.00%)
- Douglas Wilder – 240 (0.00%)

Including write-in candidates.

== See also ==
- List of Democratic Socialists of America who have held office in the United States
