= Farrah Khan =

American politician

Farrah N. Khan
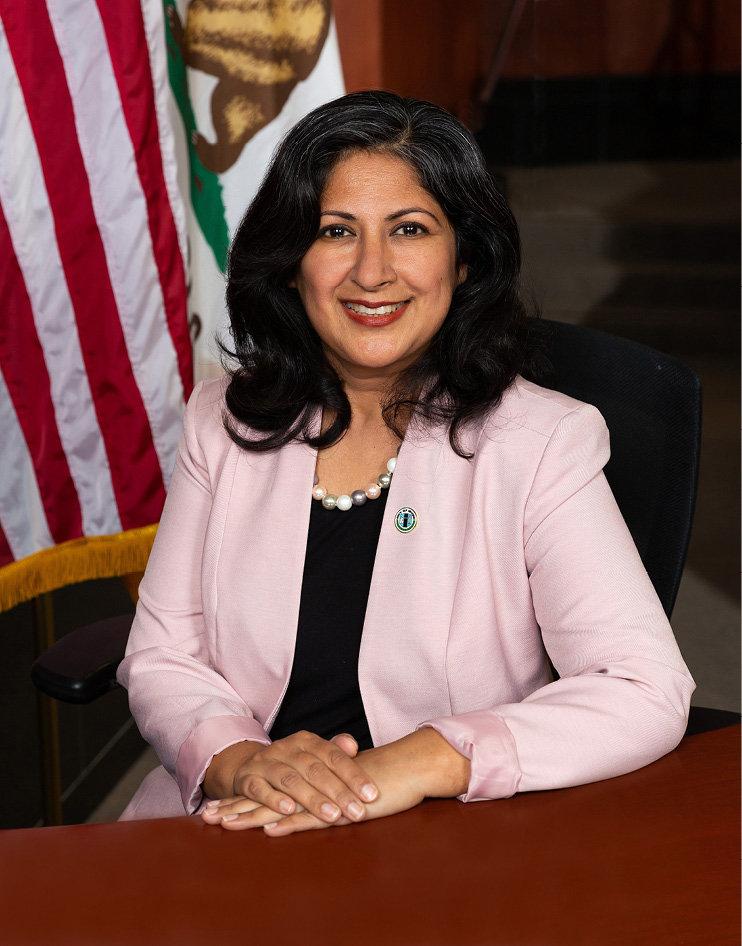

Mayor of Irvine
- In office 8 December 2020 – 10 December 2024
- Preceded by: Christina Shea
- Succeeded by: Larry Agran

Member of the Irvine City Council
- In office 11 December 2018 – 10 December 2024

Personal details
- Born: December 10, 1971 (age 54) Lahore, Pakistan
- Party: Democratic
- Education: University of California, Davis

Farrah N. Khan (born December 10, 1971) is an American politician who served as the 23rd mayor of Irvine, California from 2020 to 2024. A member of the Democratic Party, Khan first served Irvine as a member of City Council before being elected mayor in 2020.

In July 2023, Khan announced that she would run for the third district seat of the Orange County Board of Supervisors.

== Early life and education ==
Khan was born in Lahore, Pakistan. She immigrated to the United States when she was three years old. She subsequently lived in northern California. She received her bachelor's degree in English literature from the University of California, Davis. She moved to Irvine in 2004.

== Career ==
Prior to working in politics, Khan worked as a regulatory manager for a biotech company. She has also worked as a small business owner and was executive director of the Newport Mesa Irvine Interfaith Council.

=== Irvine City Council ===
Khan first ran for Irvine City Council unsuccessfully in 2016. Running again in 2018, she was elected. She was the first Muslim and woman of color to be elected to Irvine's city council.

While on the Irvine City Council, she co-introduced an item with Councilmember Melissa Fox that repealed a decades-old ordinance that did not offer members of the LGBT community anti-discrimination protections.

== Mayor of Irvine ==
Khan ran for mayor during the 2020 election. She won about 47% of the vote, unseating mayor pro tem Christina Shea, a Republican, who received 36% of the vote. Khan stated that she was motivated to run for mayor after Shea made controversial criticisms of Black Lives Matter protestors, remarks that Khan felt were "not reflective of our community". Her election as mayor made her not only the first Muslim and woman of color to serve Irvine City Council but also the first Muslim woman to serve as mayor of a large city in the United States.

Khan ran again for mayor in the 2022 election, and won reelection with 37.8% of the vote.

=== Controversies ===
==== Association with a denier of the Armenian genocide ====
In March 2022, a video surfaced of a 2020 meeting between Khan and Ergun Kirlikovali, a former President of the Assembly of Turkish American Associations. In the video, Kirlikovali appears to make a joke that a box of Turkish delights could be eaten on Armenians' occasions, which would make them disappear. Khan appears to joke along, saying she would make sure to eat the Turkish delights in front of them. Kirlikovali is a known Armenian genocide denier. Some claimed that the joke was about making Armenians disappear whereas Khan has maintained that that was not the case.

This video was met with outrage and criticism, especially by members of the Armenian community. The group ANCA Western Region criticized Khan for associating with a genocide denier and pointed out that Khan appointed Kirlikovali to her mayoral advisory committee in 2021.

In response, Khan claimed that the video was not accurate, stating that the video's captions had an "incorrect translation". Khan also promised to cut ties with deniers of the Armenian genocide.

==== Leaking private text messages ====
In October 2022, Khan received scrutiny as to whether she was responsible for leaking texts she had with United States representative Katie Porter. The texts concerned an incident in which Porter held a town hall meeting, at which protestors arrived. Porter expressed in the texts her dissatisfaction with how the Irvine Police Department handled the situation. These texts were later reported on by Fox News. Local Democrats questioned how the media got ahold of the texts. Khan claimed that the texts were requested via a public records request. However, the Irvine City Clerk disputed that, stating that the request was not fulfilled until after the Fox News report.

== Electoral history ==
=== 2016 ===
Irvine City Council at-large election (two seats), 2016
Candidate	Votes	%
Christina Shea (incumbent)	28,072	20.2
Melissa Fox	24,023	17.3
Anthony Kuo	21,301	15.3
Farrah Khan	16,487	11.9
Anila Ali	10,011	7.2
Shiva Farivar	9,799	7.0
Dale Cheema	8,844	6.6
Courtney Santos	6,758	4.9
Matthew Ehorn	4,988	3.6
Hyunjoung Ahn	4,651	3.3
Ian Daelucian	4,349	3.1
Total votes	139,283	

=== 2018 ===
Irvine City Council at-large election (two seats), 2018
Candidate	Votes	%
Farrah Khan	23,085	15.5
Anthony Kuo	21,071	14.2
Carrie O'Malley	19,267	13.0
Lauren Johnson-Norris	17,147	11.5
Kev Abazajian	16,889	11.4
Frank McGill	12,313	8.3
Jaci Woods	10,092	6.8
Mark Newgent	8,077	5.4
John Park	6,877	4.6
Gang Chen	5,835	3.9
Lee Sun	5,462	3.7
David Chey	2,624	1.8
Total votes	148,739	

=== 2020 ===
City of Irvine mayoral election, 2020
Candidate	Votes	%
Farrah Khan	56,304	47.6
Christina Shea (incumbent)	42,738	36.1
Luis Huang	9,684	8.2
Katherine Daigle	9,654	8.2
Total votes	118,380	

=== 2022 ===
City of Irvine mayoral election, 2022
Candidate	Votes	%
Farrah Khan	29,628	37.8
Branda Lin	21,560	27.5
Simon Moon	14,834	18.9
Katherine Daigle	7,184	9.2
Tom Chomyn	5,129	6.5
Total votes	78,335	

=== 2024 ===
Orange County Board of Supervisors 3rd district, 2024
Party	Candidate	Votes	%
Republican	Donald P. Wagner (incumbent)	97,706	63.5
Democratic	Farrah Khan	56,207	36.5
Total votes		153,913	100.0
Republican hold			
