= Tammy Kim =

American politician (born 1971)

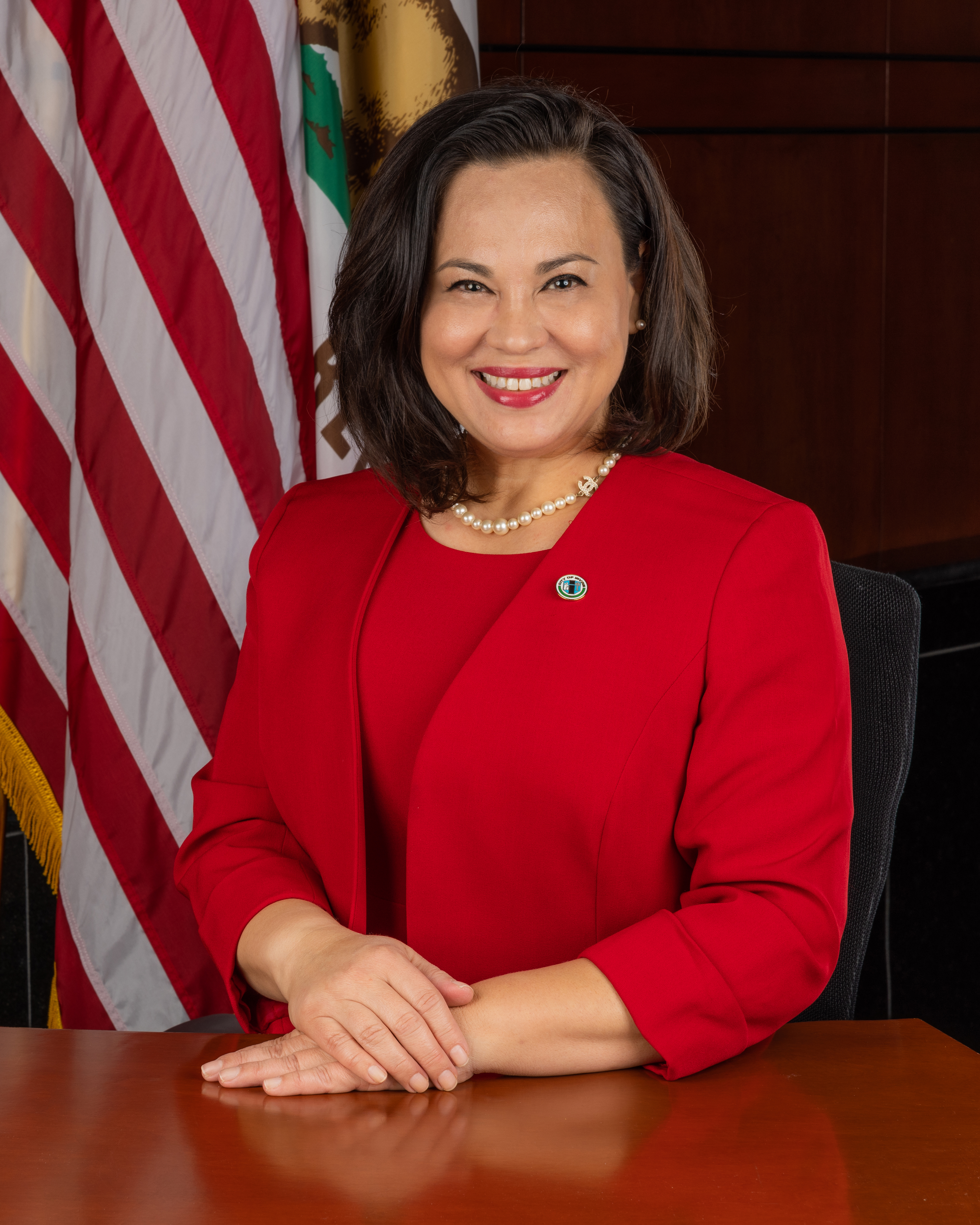

Member of the Irvine City Council
- In office December 8, 2020 – December 10, 2024

Personal details
- Born: January 16, 1971 (age 55) Seoul, Third Republic of South Korea
- Party: Democratic
- Children: 1

Korean name
- Hangul: 김태미
- Hanja: 金太美
- RR: Gim Taemi
- MR: Kim T'aemi

Tammy Kim (born January 16, 1971) is an American politician and nonprofit executive. She was a member of the Irvine City Council in California from 2020 to 2024. Kim was an elected member of the Central Committee for the Democratic Party in Orange County representing California's 73rd State Assembly district.

In February 2023, Kim announced that she would be running as a candidate for the 2024 Irvine mayoral election. she subsequently lost her race for Mayor to Larry Agran. Tammy Kim was charged with ten felonies and one misdemeanor by the Orange County District Attorney in May 2025 relating to residency discrepancies while Kim was on Council and her race for Mayor.

== Biography ==
Kim was born in Seoul, South Korea and immigrated with her family to the United States as an infant in 1971, eventually settling in Flint, Michigan where she spent her youth. Her family moved to Baltimore, Maryland right after her high school graduation and attended Michigan State University. Kim moved to Los Angeles in 1997 and then to Orange County in 2002. She settled in Irvine in 2005 with her son.

== Career ==
=== Early career ===
After moving to California in 1997, Kim spent the next several years working for companies including VMWare, EMC Corporation and CA Technologies, where she was VP of Global Talent Acquisition.

=== Nonprofit work ===
In 2015, Kim founded the Korean American Center, an Irvine based nonprofit organization with a mission to help intergenerational Korean Americans connect with the greater community. In 2017, the Korean American Center began the process of merging with Korean Community Services, becoming one of the largest nonprofit organizations in Orange County serving the Asian American Pacific Islander community. In 2018, the Korean American Center received designation as the Irvine King Sejong Institute by the South Korean government and was awarded a STARTALK grant by the National Security Agency for teaching Korean.

== Political career ==
Kim has been a supporter of various social issues regarding immigrants, working families, and under-represented linguistically isolated communities. She served as Chair of the Language Access Committee for the Orange County Registrar of Voters, Board Member of the Korean American Democratic Committee, and co-founder of Asian Americans in Action.

In 2020, Kim was elected to the Orange County Democratic Party Central Committee and Southern California Chair for the Asian Pacific Islander Caucus for the California Democratic Party in March 2021. In March 2024, Kim was re-elected to serve a four-year term on the Orange County Democratic Party Central Committee for the 73rd Assembly District.

=== Irvine City Council ===
On November 3, 2020 Kim was elected to the Irvine City Council as a first time candidate. Kim was sworn in on December 8, 2020 and later that month she was appointed by the City Council to serve a 1 year term as Vice Mayor and reappointed in 2022 to serve a second term. In 2024, she ran for mayor, but lost, finishing in second place with 34% of the vote.

==== Asian American advocacy ====
Prior to her election to the Irvine City Council, Kim participated in the Asian American political movement in Orange County. Her election coincided with the rise of Anti-Asian hate in the United States. Kim brought awareness to "the intersection of racism and misogyny" after the Atlanta spa shootings.

Kim was the subject of a xenophobic attack that was directed to her at a city council meeting in October 2021.

== Legal issues ==
In February 2025, Kim withdrew from the 2025 Irvine City Council Special Election for District 5 after a lawsuit was filed by former mayoral candidate Ron Scolesdang, alleging she did not meet residency and eligibility requirements.

On May 22, 2025, the Orange County District Attorney's Office announced it charged Kim with 10 felonies and 1 misdemeanor related to the 2024 Irvine mayoral race. The charges include perjury by declaration, filing a false document, a public official aiding the illegal casting of votes, filing false nomination papers, knowing registration of someone not entitled to vote, voter registration fraud, and making a false statement.

== Electoral history ==
=== City of Irvine, Mayor – November 5, 2024 ===
General election for City of Irvine, Mayor (1 seat)
Candidate	Votes	%
✓ Larry Agran	42,652	38.8%
Tammy Kim	37,924	34.5%
Ron Scolesdang	12,891	11.7%
Lee Sun	6,001	5.5%
Felipe Delgado	5,325	4.8%
Akshat "AB" Bhatia	2,761	2.5%
Wing Chow	2,496	2.3%

=== Irvine City Council – November 3, 2020 ===
General election for Irvine City Council (3 seats)
Candidate	Votes	%
✓ Tammy Kim	43,744	14.8%
✓ Mike Carroll*	38,615	13.1%
✓ Larry Agran	38,156	12.9%
Lauren Johnson-Norris	37,931	12.8%
John Park	32,521	11.0%
Carrie O'Malley	27,440	9.3%
Mark Newgent	15,894	5.4%
Diana Jiang	14,837	5.0%
Laura Bratton	10.305	3.5%
Dylan Green	8,813	3.0%
Christina Dillard	8,321	2.8%
Anshul Garg	6,420	2.2%
Abigail Pole	6,406	2.2%
Hai Yang Liang	5,944	2.0%

*Incumbent
