= Beth Krom =

American mayor

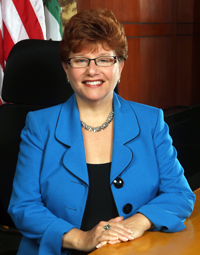

Member of the Irvine City Council
- In office December 11, 2008 – December 13, 2016
- In office November 7, 2000 – December 14, 2004

Mayor of Irvine
- In office December 14, 2004 – December 9, 2008
- Preceded by: Larry Agran
- Succeeded by: Sukhee Kang

Personal details
- Born: Beth Weinstein; December 28, 1958 (age 67) Buffalo, New York, U.S.
- Party: Democratic
- Spouse: Solly Krom
- Education: University of Texas at Austin

Beth Krom (née Weinstein; born December 28, 1958) is a former Irvine, California City Councilmember and was twice elected Mayor of Irvine, as a Democrat. Krom received a B.S. in Education from the University of Texas, Austin.

== Early life ==
Beth Krom was born in Buffalo to news anchor Irv Weinstein and his wife Elaine. She attended P.S. 81 in North Buffalo through second grade. In 1965, her family moved to the nearby suburb of Kenmore, New York where Beth attended Lindbergh Elementary, Kenmore Junior High and Kenmore West High School.

== Politics ==
In 2000 Krom first ran for public office as a candidate for the Irvine City Council. Out of a field of eleven candidates, she came in third, winning a two-year term. In 2002, she won re-election to the City Council as the top vote-getter and in 2004 she won her first term as Mayor of Irvine. In 2006, Beth Krom was re-elected with almost 60% of the vote, the largest margin of victory for any Mayor in a competitive race to that point in the city’s history.

During her term as Mayor, Irvine was recognized as the Safest Big City in America four years in a row and earned recognition as one of the “100 Best Communities for Young People” twice. In addition, the city’s “rainy day reserves” were tripled to more than $30 million during her term. Krom and fellow council member Larry Agran led the fight to defeat a plan to turn the abandoned El Toro Marine Corps base into a commercial airport. That land is now the site of the Orange County Great Park, as well as residential housing.

In 2006, Krom was invited to give a commencement address at the University of California, Irvine for the combined schools of Education, Fine Arts and Physical Sciences.

In 2008, with term limits preventing her from running for a third term as Mayor, Krom was again elected to the Irvine City Council, earning the first place spot with a lead of more than 8000 votes over the second-place finisher.

== 2010 U.S. House campaign ==
In March 2009, Krom announced her plans to run for Congress in 2010 to represent California's 48th congressional district. Her campaign embraced a "Mrs. Krom Goes to Washington" theme to reinforce the importance of engaging people in the democratic process. She faced no primary opponents, but lost the election to the incumbent Republican John B. T. Campbell III by a 36% to 60% margin.

== 2016 temporary Mayor of Irvine ==
In December 2016, Krom was voted in as temporary Mayor by the Irvine City Council to fill the vacancy created when Steven Choi resigned a few days before the end of his term, to take a seat in the California State Assembly. The appointment was for 9 days until the mayor-elect, Donald P. Wagner, began his term.

== Personal life ==
Krom and her husband, Solly, had three children: daughter Abby, and sons Hershel and Noah. Noah died in 2009 at age 22, a week prior to his graduation from the University of California Santa Barbara. The autopsy found his blood alcohol level to have been .257 at the time of his death.
