= Deborah Pauly =

Deborah L. Pauly (born July 25, 1959, in Virginia) is a perennial candidate and graduate of Trinity Law School in Orange County, CA. She serves as a current member of the National Council of the John Birch Society and works as a staff attorney at the Lex Rex Institute, a nonprofit Constitutional advocacy organization, having made her reputation as a southern California Tea Party-friendly politician.

== Earlier career ==
Pauly was appointed as a voting delegate to the California Republican Party by State Senator John Moorlach and an elected member of the Central Committee of the Republican Party of Orange County, as one of six people from the 60th Assembly District and later 68th Assembly District.

While serving as Councilwoman of the City of Villa Park, Pauly received the 2009 Woman of the Year Award from the California Legislative Women's Caucus as part of the Caucus's Women's History Month observances. Pauly served active duty in the United States Air Force as a Public Affairs Specialist.

In 2010, Pauly attracted attention by comparing the Affordable Care Act to sodomy.

A 2011 video of a protest at an Islamic charity event captured Pauly addressing a crowd outside denouncing the event as "pure, unadulterated evil" and inviting US Marines "to help these terrorists to an early meeting in paradise."

== Perennial candidate ==
In 2012, Pauly attempted to advance her elected career by running for the 3rd district seat on the Orange County Board of Supervisors but was defeated in a landslide 68.9%-31.1% by another Republican.

In 2016, Pauly attempted to revive her dormant elected career by running for California's 68th State Assembly district but ultimately finished in 4th place with 14.1% behind two other Republicans and a Democrat in the primary election.

In 2019, Pauly again attempted to revive her dormant elected career by running for the 3rd district seat on the Orange County Board of Supervisors again but ultimately finished in 5th place with 5.3% of the vote behind three other Republicans and a Democrat in the special election.

In the 2020s, she appears to have pivoted from attempts to enter mainstream political office in favor of participation in grass-roots organization efforts.

== Education ==
Pauly graduated summa cum laude with a Bachelor of Science in Mass Communications and a minor in political science from Southern Illinois University Edwardsville.

In 2005, Pauly was a participant in the Marian Bergeson Excellence in Public Service Series, a program created to incubate the careers of promising Republican female politicians through training, mentoring, and building networking relationships.

Pauly is a graduate of Trinity Law School.

== Drunk driving ==
While driving a Porsche 911, Pauly was arrested for drunk driving after hitting a parked car in Anaheim, California in 2015 during her campaign for State Assembly.

Three years earlier during her campaign for Orange County Supervisor, Pauly had attempted to drive her then-husband's Porsche home when he was arrested for drunk driving, but she was prevented from doing so by the Orange Police Department because she was also drunk.

== Electoral history ==
=== 2012 ===
Orange County Board of Supervisors 3rd district election, 2012
Party	Candidate	Votes	%
Republican	Todd Spitzer	53,322	68.9
Republican	Deborah Pauly	24,115	31.1
Total votes		77,437	100.0
Republican hold			

=== 2016 ===
California's 68th State Assembly district election, 2016
Primary election
Party	Candidate	Votes	%
Democratic	Sean Jay Panahi	32,610	33.0
Republican	Steven Choi	19,559	19.8
Republican	Harry Sidhu	19,405	19.7
Republican	Deborah Pauly	13,880	14.1
Republican	Alexia Deligianni-Brydges	5,098	5.2
No party preference	Brian Chuchua	4,635	4.7
Republican	Kostas Roditis	3,528	3.6
Total votes		98,715	100.0
General election
Republican	Steven Choi	114,210	60.3
Democratic	Sean Jay Panahi	75,231	39.7
Total votes		189,441	100.0
Republican hold			

=== 2019 ===
Orange County Board of Supervisors 3rd district special election, 2019
Party	Candidate	Votes	%
Republican	Donald P. Wagner	30,240	42.0
Democratic	Loretta Sanchez	26,708	37.1
Republican	Kristine "Kris" Murray	5,338	7.4
Republican	Larry Bales	3,912	5.4
Republican	Deborah Pauly	3,847	5.3
Republican	Kim-Thy "Katie" Hoang Bayliss	1,366	1.9
Republican	Katherine Daigle	597	0.8
Total votes		72,008	100.0
Republican hold			
