= Mayoral elections in Irvine, California =

Mayoral elections in Irvine, California, are held every two years.

The first direct-election for mayor in the city's history was held in 1988. All such elections have been held under state laws that make municipal elections in California officially non-partisan.

== 1988 ==
Irvine mayoral election, 1988
- June 7, 1988
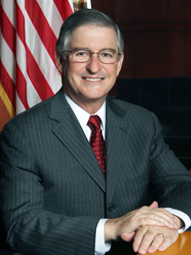

Candidate	Larry Agran	Barry J. Hammond	Hal Maloney
Popular vote	15,651	8,707	3,111
Percentage	57.0%	31.7%	11.3
Mayor before election
Larry Agran
Elected mayor
Larry Agran

The 1988 mayoral election, held on June 7, was the first direct-election for mayor in the city's history. Larry Agran was re-elected.

Results
Candidate	Votes	%
Larry Agran (incumbent)	15,651	57.0
Barry J. Hammond	8,707	31.7
Hal Maloney	3,111	11.3
Total votes	27,469	

== 1990 ==
Irvine mayoral election, 1990
- June 5, 1990

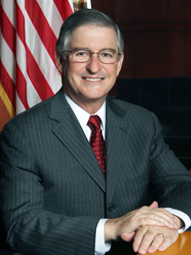
Candidate	Sally Anne Sheridan	Larry Agran
Popular vote	14,256	13,584
Percentage	51.2%	48.8%
Mayor before election
Larry Agran
Elected mayor
Sally Anne Sheridan

The 1990 election was held on June 5, 1990. Sally Anne Sheridan unseated incumbent mayor Larry Agran.

Results
Candidate	Votes	%
Sally Anne Sheridan	14,256	51.2
Larry Agran (incumbent)	13,584	48.8
Total votes	27,840	

== 1992 ==
Irvine mayoral election, 1992
- November 3, 1992
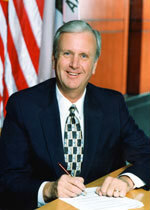

Candidate	Mike Ward	Marc Goldstone	Helen T. Cameron
Popular vote	16,435	11,730	11,204
Percentage	37.3%	26.6%	25.4
Mayor before election
Sally Anne Sheridan
Elected mayor
Mike Ward

The 1992 mayoral election, held on November 3, was the first Irvine mayoral election to be consolidated with the statewide general election (the two previous direct mayoral elections had instead been held coinciding with the statewide primary elections). Mike Ward was elected.

Results
Candidate	Votes	%
Mike Ward	16,435	37.3
Marc Goldstone	11,730	26.6
Helen T. Cameron	11,204	25.4
Les Racey	1,973	4.5
Al Nasser	1,699	3.9
David Fondots	1,032	2.3
Total votes	44,073	

== 1994 ==
Irvine mayoral election, 1994
- November 8, 1994
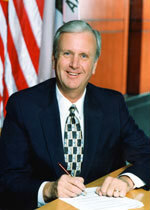
Candidate	Mike Ward
Popular vote	26,055
Percentage	100%
Mayor before election
Mike Ward
Elected mayor
Mike Ward

The 1994 mayoral election was held on November 8. Mike Ward, who ran unopposed, was re-elected.

Results
Candidate	Votes	%
Mike Ward (incumbent)	26,055	100
Total votes	26,055	100

== 1996 ==
Irvine mayoral election, 1996
- November 5, 1996
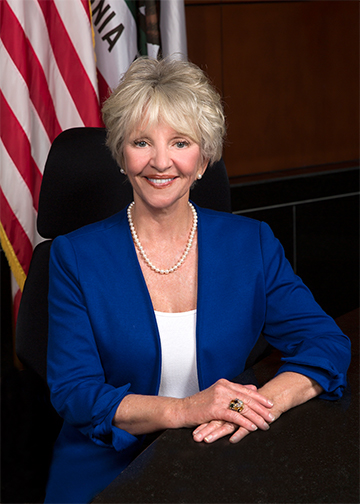

Candidate	Christina L. Shea	Sally Anne Sheridan
Popular vote	19,479	11,537
Percentage	49.8%	29.5%
Candidate	Paul Johnson	Guy E. Mailly
Popular vote	4,747	3,314
Percentage	12.1	8.5
Mayor before election
Mike Ward
Elected mayor
Christina L. Shea

The 1996 mayoral election was held on November 5. Christina L. Shea was elected.

Results
Candidate	Votes	%
Christina L. Shea	19,479	49.8
Sally Anne Sheridan	11,537	29.5
Paul Johnson	4,747	12.1
Guy E. Mailly	3,314	8.5
Total votes	39,077	100

== 1998 ==
Irvine mayoral election, 1998
- November 3, 1998
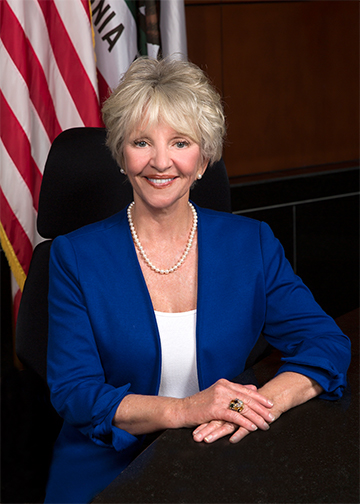
Candidate	Christina L. Shea
Popular vote	29,067
Percentage	100%
Mayor before election
Christina L. Shea
Elected mayor
Christina L. Shea

The 1998 mayoral election was held on November 3. Christina L. Shea, who ran unopposed, was re-elected.

Results
Candidate	Votes	%
Christina L. Shea (incumbent)	29,067	100
Total votes	29,067	100

== 2000 ==
Irvine mayoral election, 2000
- November 7, 2000
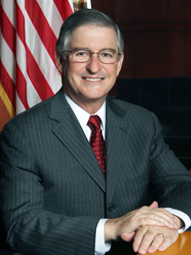
Candidate	Larry Agran
Popular vote	34.905
Percentage	100.0%
Mayor before election
Christina L. Shea
Elected mayor
Larry Agran

The 2000 mayoral election was held on November 7. Larry Agran, who had previously served two terms as mayor, ran unopposed and was elected.

Results
Candidate	Votes	%
Larry Agran	34,905	100.0
Total votes	34,905	

== 2002 ==
Irvine mayoral election, 2002
- November 5, 2002
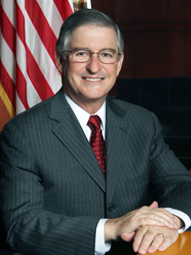

Candidate	Larry Agran	Mike House
Popular vote	19,886	17,358
Percentage	53.4%	46.6%
Mayor before election
Larry Agran
Elected mayor
Larry Agran

The 2002 mayoral election was held on November 5. Larry Agran was re-elected.

Results
Candidate	Votes	%
Larry Agran (incumbent)	19,886	53.4
Mike House	17,358	46.6
Total votes	37,244	

== 2004 ==
Irvine mayoral election, 2004
- November 2, 2004
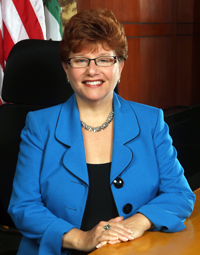

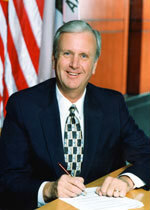
Candidate	Beth Krom	Mike Ward
Popular vote	26,157	24,153
Percentage	44.0%	40.6%
Candidate	Earle Zucht	Ronald Eugene Allen
Popular vote	4,984	4,171
Percentage	8.4%	7.0%
Mayor before election
Larry Agran
Elected mayor
Beth Krom

The 2004 mayoral election was held on November 2. Beth Krom was elected. Among the candidates defeated by Krom was former mayor Mike Ward.

Results
Candidate	Votes	%
Beth Krom	26,157	44.0
Mike Ward	24,153	40.6
Earle Zucht	4,984	8.4
Ronald Eugene Allen	4,171	7.0
Total votes	59,465	

== 2006 ==
Irvine mayoral election, 2006
- November 7, 2006
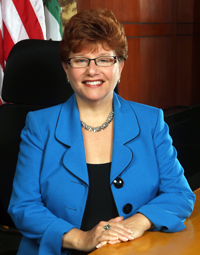

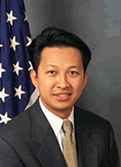
Candidate	Beth Krom	John Duong
Popular vote	26,082	17,657
Percentage	59.6%	40.4%
Mayor before election
Beth Krom
Elected mayor
Beth Krom

The 2006 mayoral election was held on November 7. Beth Krom was re-elected.

Results
Candidate	Votes	%
Beth Krom (incumbent)	26,082	59.6
John Duong	17,657	40.4
Total votes	43,739	

== 2008 ==
Irvine mayoral election, 2008
- November 4, 2008
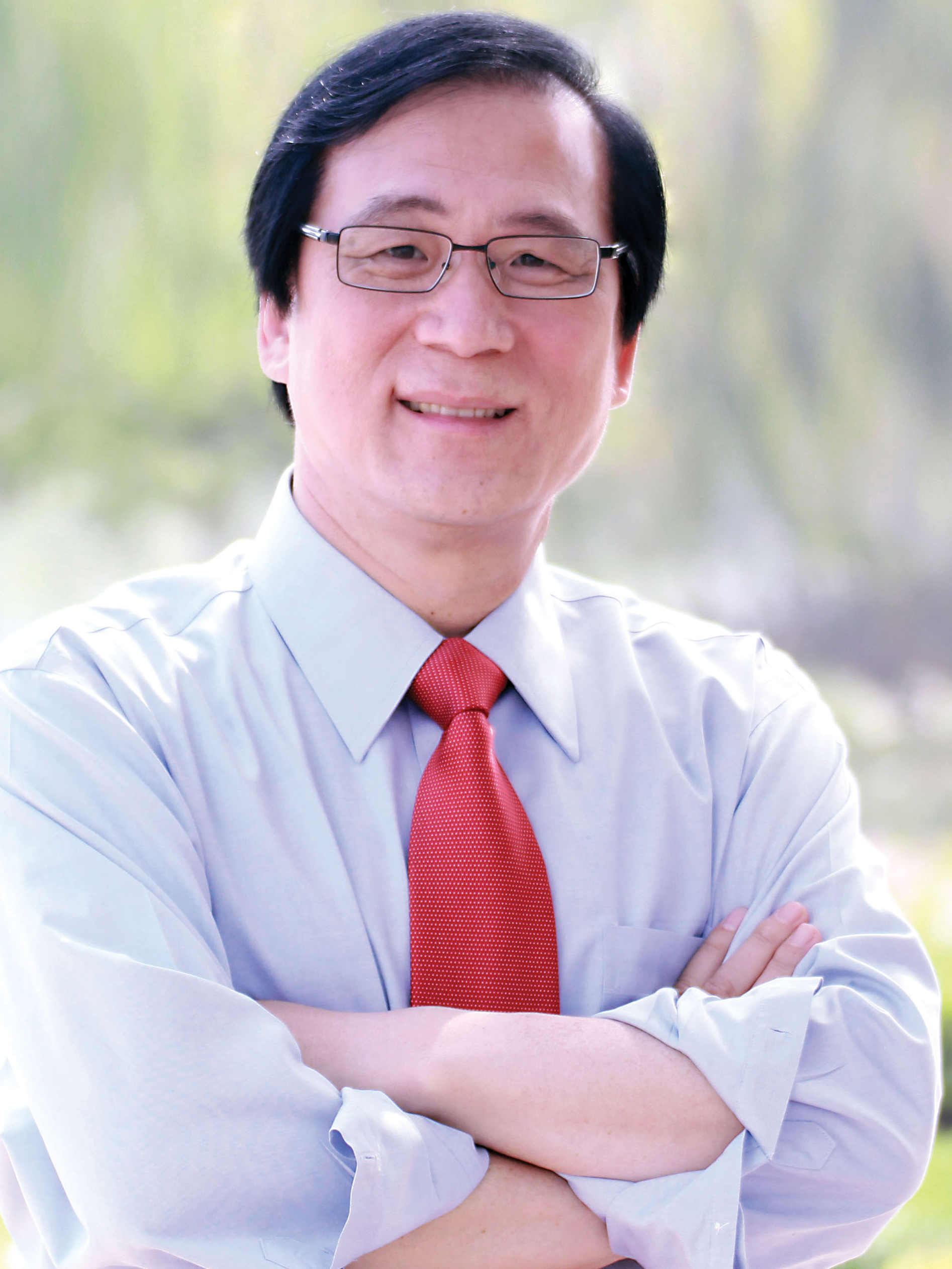

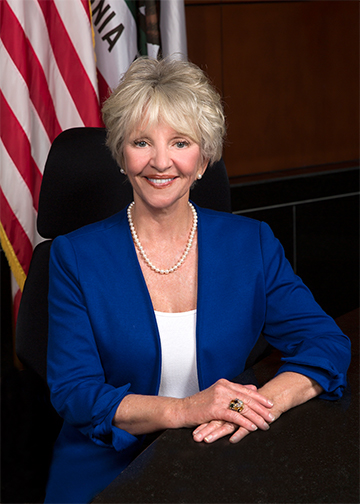
Candidate	Sukhee Kang	Christina L. Shea
Popular vote	38,505	35,481
Percentage	52.0%	48.0%
Mayor before election
Beth Krom
Elected mayor
Sukhee Kang

The 2008 mayoral election was held on November 4. Sukhee Kang was elected, becoming the first Korean American mayor of a major U.S. city. He defeated former mayor Christina L. Shea.

Results
Candidate	Votes	%
Sukhee Kang	38,505	52.0
Christina L. Shea	35,481	48.0
Total votes	73,986	

== 2010 ==
Irvine mayoral election, 2010
- November 2, 2010
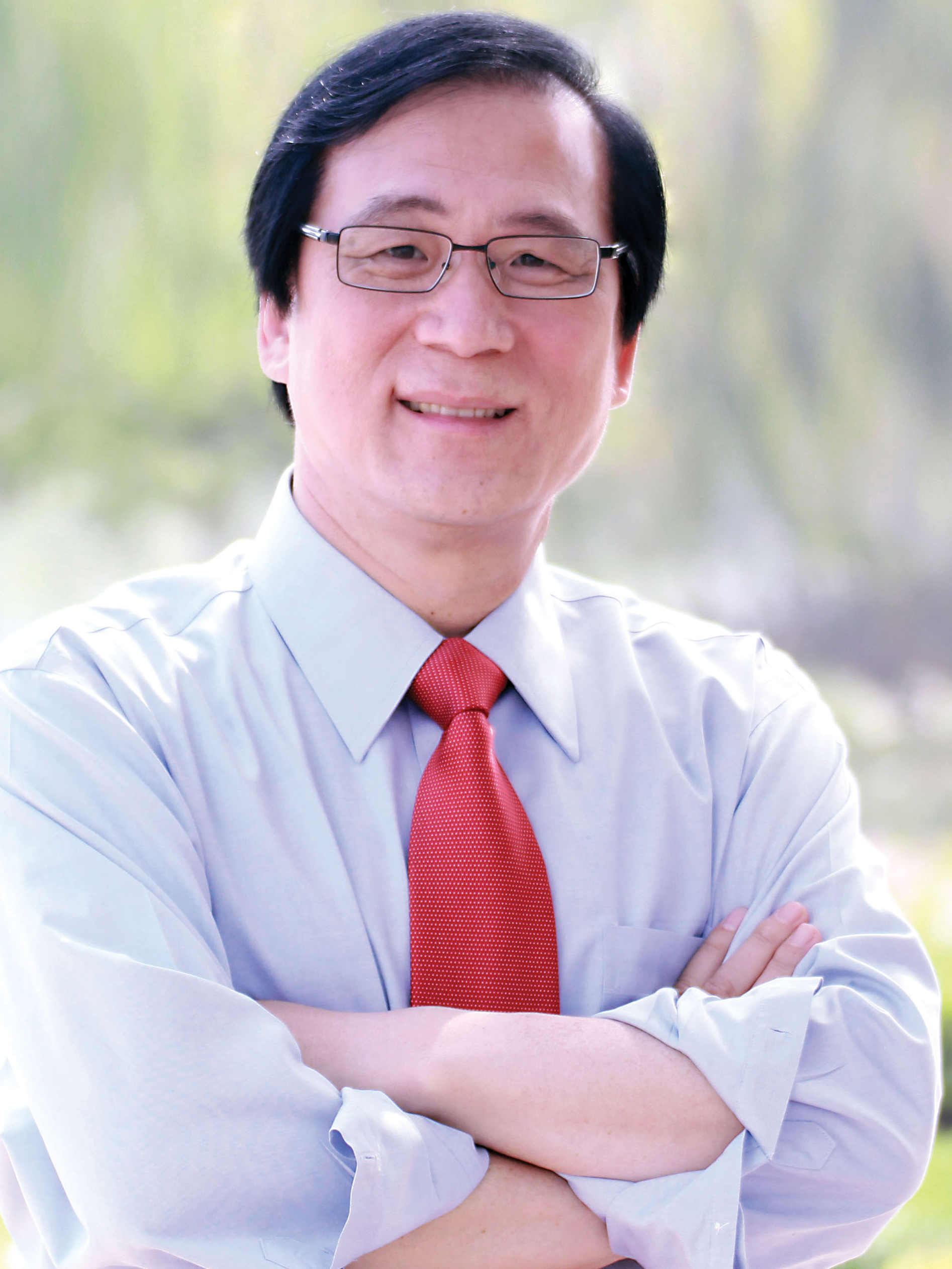

Candidate	Sukhee Kang	Christopher Gonzales
Popular vote	34,634	19,383
Percentage	64.1%	35.9%
Mayor before election
Sukhee Kang
Elected mayor
Sukhee Kang

The 2010 mayoral election was held on November 2. Sukhee Kang was re-elected.

Results
Candidate	Votes	%
Sukhee Kang (incumbent)	36,634	64.1
Christopher Gonzalez	19,383	35.9
Total votes	54,017	

== 2012 ==
Irvine mayoral election, 2012
- November 6, 2012
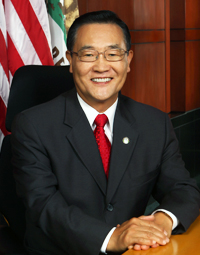

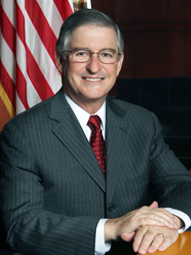

Candidate	Steven Choi	Larry Agran	Katherine Daigle
Popular vote	32,505	28,741	9,951
Percentage	45.7%	40.4%	13.9%
Mayor before election
Sukhee Kang
Elected mayor
Steven Choi

The 2012 mayoral election was held on November 6. Steven Choi was elected.

Results
Candidate	Votes	%
Steven Choi	32,505	45.7
Larry Agran	28,741	40.4
Katherine Daigle	9,951	13.9
Total votes	71,197	

== 2014 ==
Irvine mayoral election, 2014
- November 4, 2014
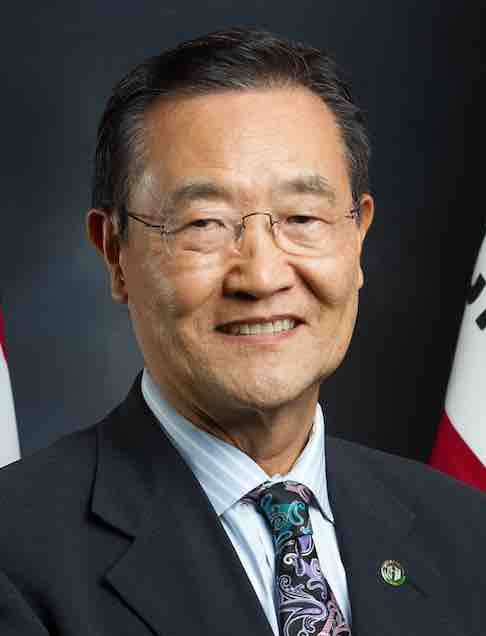

Candidate	Steven Choi	Mary Ann Gaido	Katherine Daigle
Popular vote	18,333	17,380	4,698
Percentage	45.4%	43.0%	11.6%
Mayor before election
Steven Choi
Elected mayor
Steven Choi

The 2014 mayoral election was held on November 4. Steven Choi was re-elected.

Results
Candidate	Votes	%
Steven Choi (incumbent)	18,333	45.4
Mary Ann Gaido	17,380	43.0
Katherine Daigle	4,698	11.6
Total votes	40,411	

== 2016 ==
Irvine mayoral election, 2016
- November 8, 2016
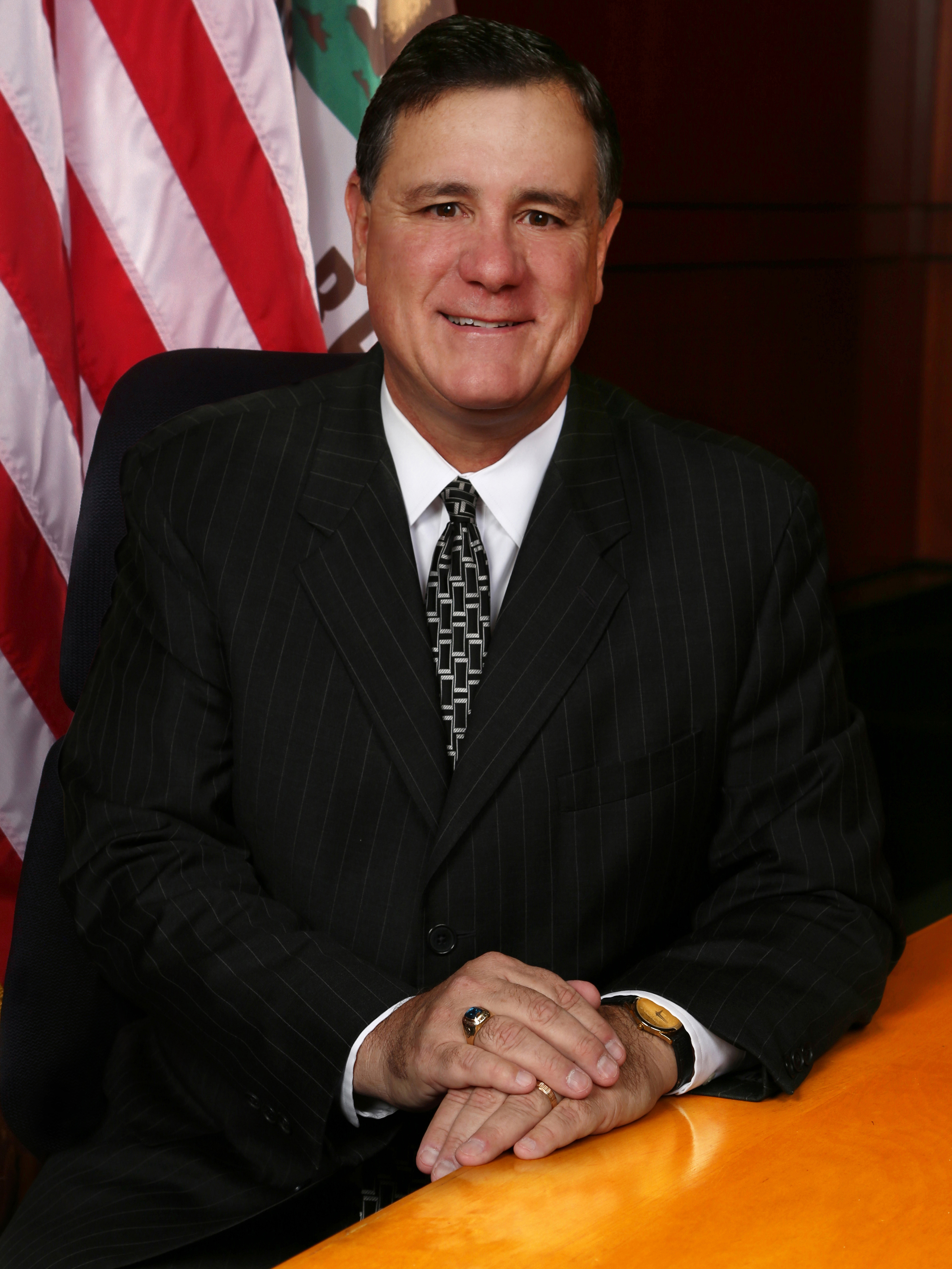

Candidate	Donald P. Wagner	Mary Ann Gaido
Popular vote	30,002	26,278
Percentage	37.7%	33.0%
Candidate	Gang Chen	Katherine Daigle
Popular vote	11,816	8,299
Percentage	14.8%	10.4%
Mayor before election
Steven Choi
Elected mayor
Donald P. Wagner

The 2016 mayoral election was held on November 8. Donald P. Wagner was elected.

Results
Candidate	Votes	%
Donald P. Wagner	30,002	37.7
Mary Ann Gaido	26,278	33.0
Gang Chen	11,816	14.8
Katherine Daigle	8,299	10.4
David Chey	3,206	4.0
Total votes	79,601	

== 2018 ==
Irvine mayoral election, 2018
- November 6, 2018
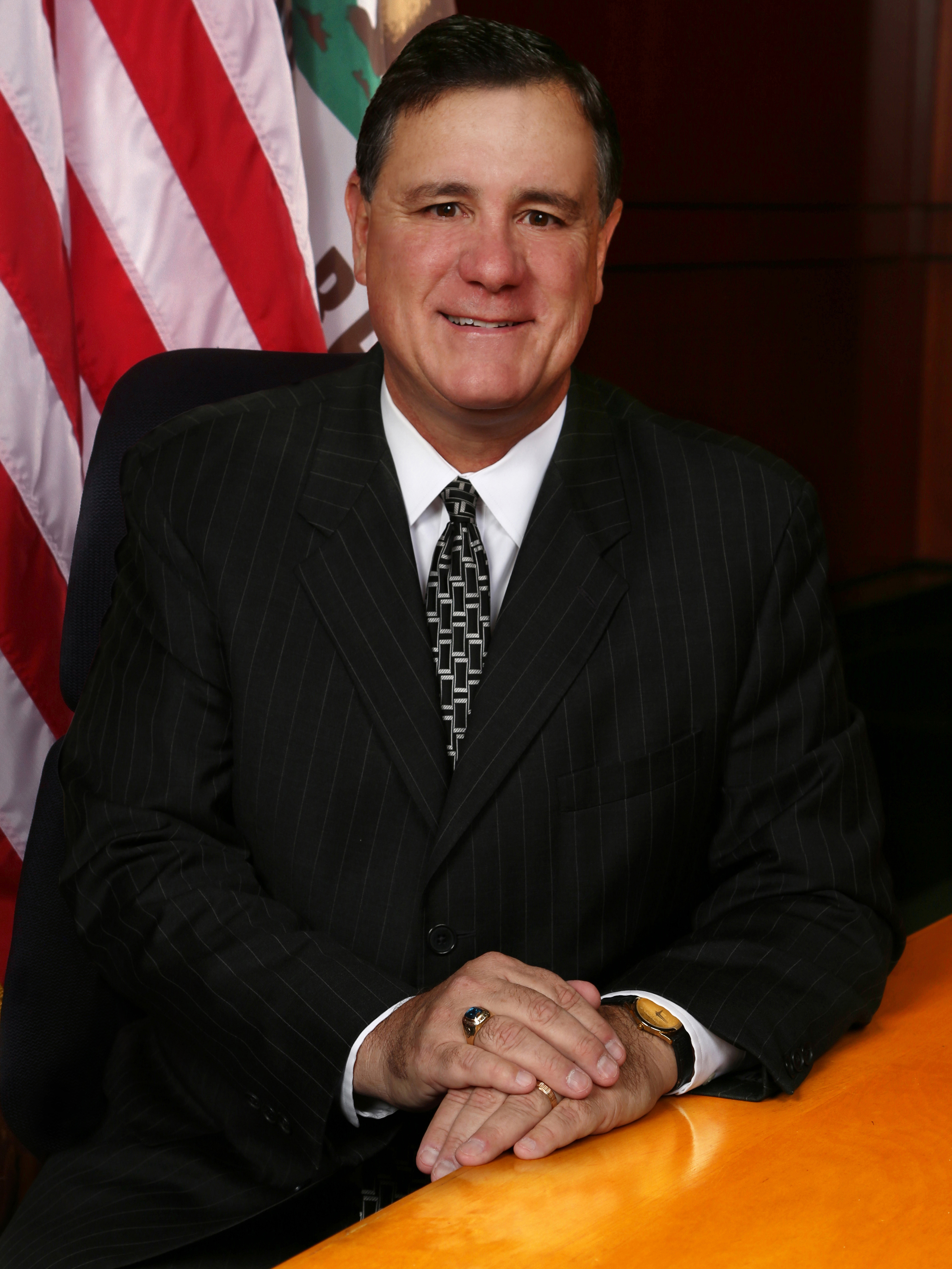

Candidate	Donald P. Wagner	Ed Pope
Popular vote	35,592	24,682
Percentage	45.3%	31.4%
Candidate	Katherine Daigle	Ing Tiong
Popular vote	13,018	5,341
Percentage	16.6%	6.8%
- Results by county supervisorial district Wagner: 40–50%
Mayor before election
Donald P. Wagner
Elected mayor
Donald P. Wagner

The 2018 mayoral election was held on November 6. Donald P. Wagner was re-elected.

2018 Irvine mayoral election
Candidate	Votes	%
Donald P. Wagner (incumbent)	35,592	45.3%
Ed Pope	24,682	31.4%
Katherine Daigle	13,018	16.6%
Ing Tiong	5,341	6.8%
Total votes	78,633	100%

== 2020 ==
2020 Irvine mayoral election
- November 3, 2020
- Turnout: 80.24% ▲17.82 pp
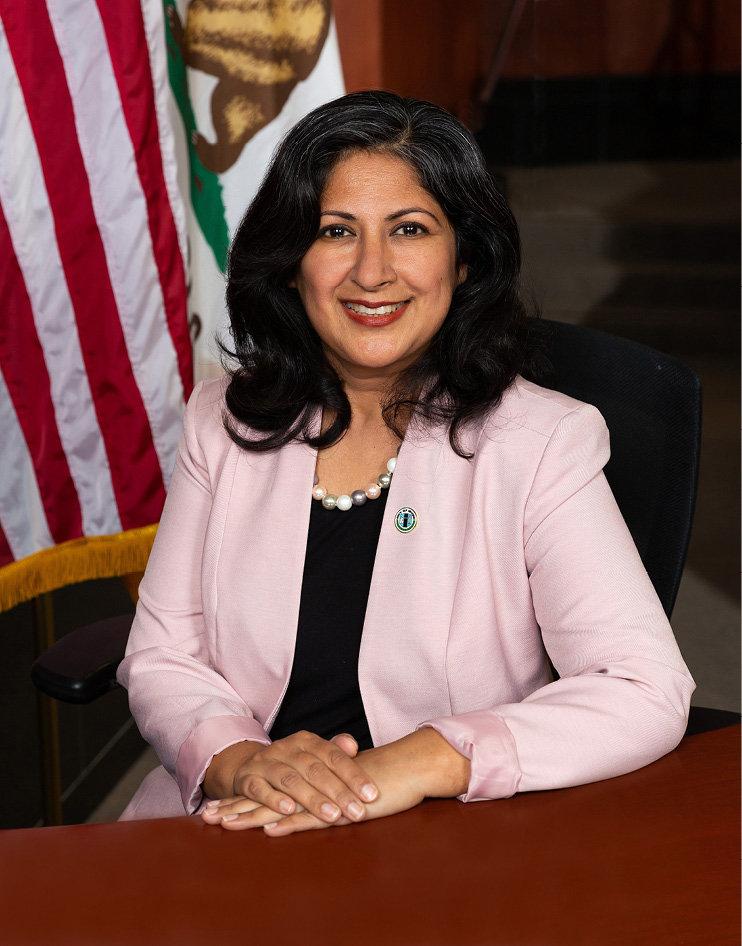

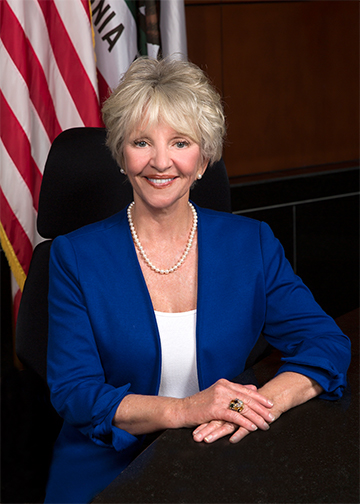
Candidate	Farrah Khan	Christina Shea
Popular vote	56,304	42,738
Percentage	47.56%	36.10%
Candidate	Luis Huang	Katherine Daigle
Popular vote	9,684	9,654
Percentage	8.18%	8.16%
- Precinct results Khan: 30–40% 40–50% 50–60% 60–70% 70–80% Shea: 40–50% 50–60% >90% No votes
Mayor before election
Christina Shea
Elected mayor
Farrah Khan

The 2020 mayoral election was held on November 3. Mayor Pro Tem Christina Shea, who had taken office on April 13, 2019, when Mayor Donald P. Wagner vacated the seat after winning a special election to the Orange County Board of Supervisors, lost the seat to Councilwoman Farrah Khan, the first Democrat to be elected since 2010.

Declared candidates:

- Katherine Daigle, small business owner and perennial candidate (party preference: Republican)
- Luis Huang, solar engineer and advocate (party preference: Democratic)
- Farrah Khan, business consultant and city council member (party preference: Democratic)
- Christina Shea, incumbent mayor and former city council member (party preference: Republican)

2020 Irvine mayoral election (party preference listed)
Candidate	Votes	%
Farrah N. Khan	56,304	47.56%
Christina L. Shea (incumbent)	42,738	36.10%
Luis Huang	9,684	8.18%
Katherine Daigle	9,654	8.16%
Total votes	118,380	100.00%

== 2022 ==
2022 Irvine mayoral election
- November 8, 2022
- Turnout: 55.2%
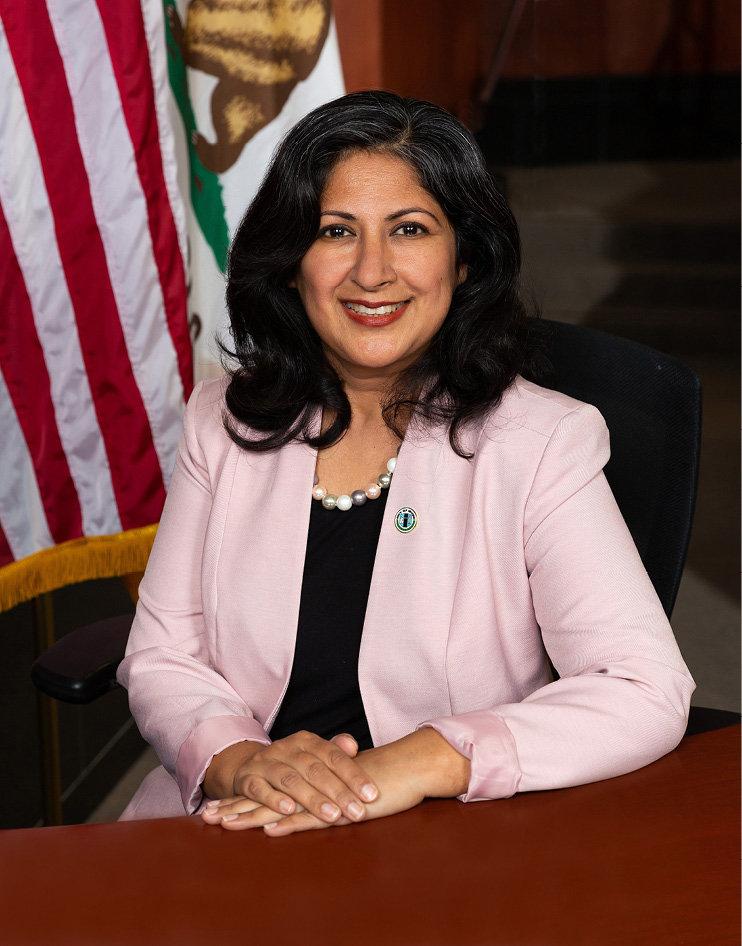

Candidate	Farrah Khan	Branda Lin
Popular vote	29,628	21,560
Percentage	37.8%	27.5%
Candidate	Simon Moon	Katherine Daigle
Popular vote	14,834	7,184
Percentage	18.9%	9.2%
- Precinct results Khan: 20–30% 30–40% 40–50% 50–60% 60–70% Lin: 30–40% 40–50% No votes
Mayor before election
Farrah Khan
Elected mayor
Farrah Khan

The 2022 mayoral election was held on November 8. Farrah Khan was re-elected.

2022 Irvine mayoral election
Candidate	Votes	%
Farrah N. Khan (incumbent)	29,628	37.8
Branda Lin	21,560	27.5
Simon Moon	14,834	18.9
Katherine Daigle	7,184	9.2
Tom Chomyn	5,129	6.6
Total votes	78,335	100.00
Invalid or blank votes	6,328	7.5

== 2024 ==
2024 Irvine mayoral election
- November 5, 2024
- Turnout: 78.1%
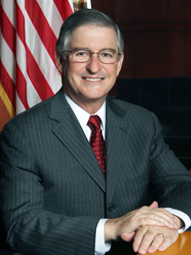

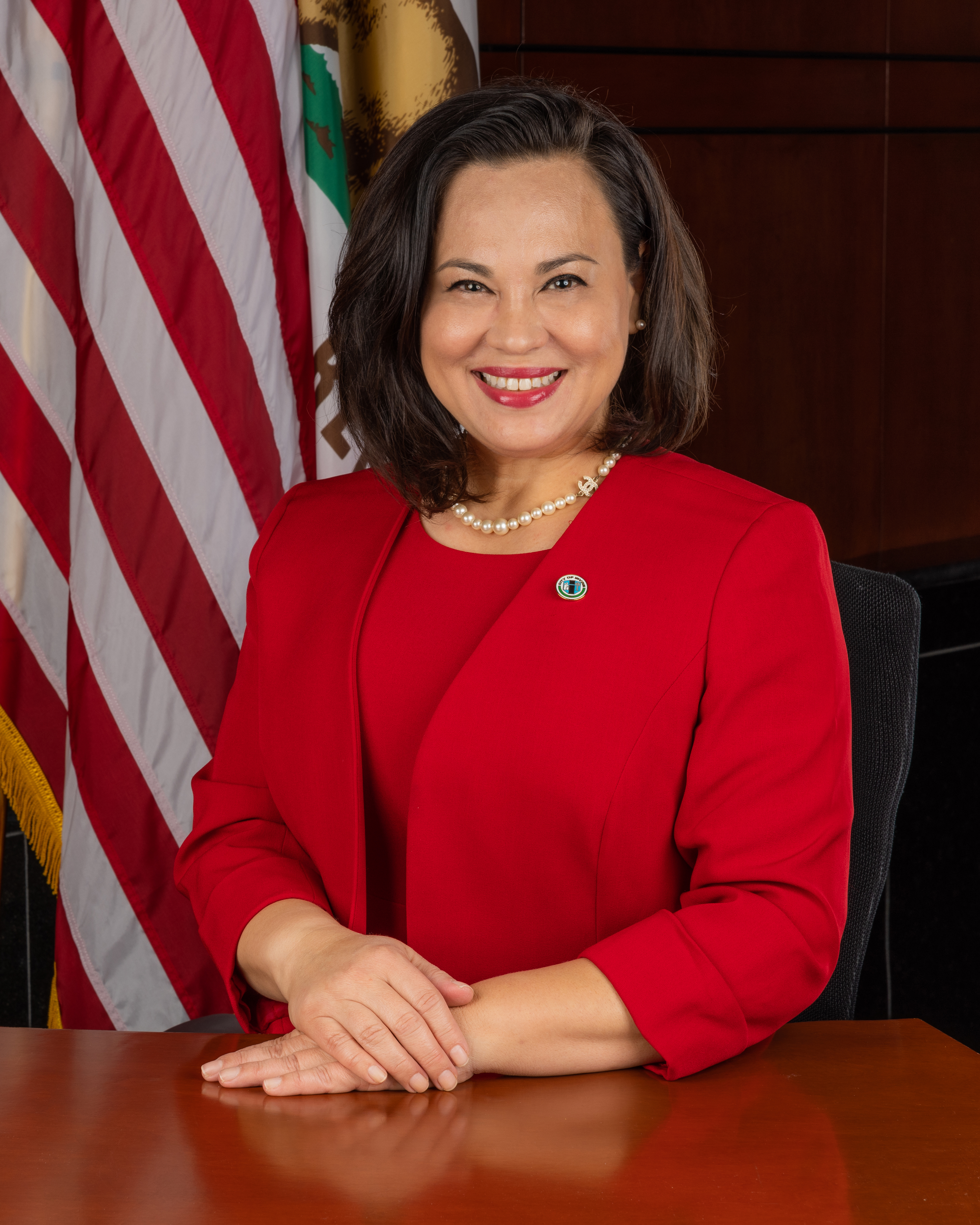
Candidate	Larry Agran	Tammy Kim
Popular vote	42,652	37,924
Percentage	38.8%	34.5%
Candidate	Ron Scolesdang	Liqing Lee Sun
Popular vote	12,891	6,001
Percentage	11.7%	5.5%
- Precinct results Agran: 30–40% 40–50% 50–60% 60–70% Kim: 30–40% 40–50% 50–60% 60–70% No votes
Mayor before election
Farrah Khan
Elected mayor
Larry Agran

The 2024 mayoral election was held on November 5, 2024 and coincided with elections for city council. Incumbent mayor Farrah Khan, who was first sworn into office in 2020, cannot seek re-election due to term limits.

=== Background ===
Although Irvine's municipal elections are officially nonpartisan, candidates tend to associate themselves with either the Democratic or Republican Party. In July 2023, term-limited incumbent mayor Farrah Khan had announced that she would run for the 3rd district seat of the Orange County Board of Supervisors against incumbent supervisor Don Wagner. In March 2024, Khan lost to Wagner, who received greater than 50% of votes, avoiding a runoff election.

In June 2022, ahead of the 2022 mayoral election, councilmembers Tammy Kim and Mike Carroll had introduced an agenda item to the Irvine City Council, which would have removed the mayoral seat from the ballot and switched it to an office appointed by the city council. Kim alleged that she had never endorsed the move to change the seat, and had only agreed to serve as a second on the motion vote in exchange for Carroll's support for a different motion on the agenda. The day before the meeting, Carroll had attempted to pull the agenda-setting rule off the agenda following "strong public backlash", including official condemnation from the Orange County Democratic Party; nonetheless, it was brought to a vote and the city councilmembers voted to repeal the rule. Had the rule passed, Irvine would have been the largest city in the United States without a directly elected mayor.

In 2014, Irvine voters had approved a rule to its city charter such that councilmembers and the mayors can serve no more than two full two-year terms for life. Agran was one of the longest serving city council members in Orange County, having served for over three decades on and off the city council since 1978, alongside serving as mayor for five non-consecutive two-year terms. In December 2022, Agran had resigned with a week left on his term in order to run for another four years on the city council, which prompted his colleague and fellow mayoral contender Tammy Kim to call it a "slippery power grab" and ask Agran if "40 years on the city council [was] not enough".

=== Candidates ===
==== Declared ====
- Larry Agran (Democrat), at-large Irvine City Councilor (2022–present), former mayor of Irvine (1982–1984, 1986–1990, 2000–2004), and 1992 Democratic presidential candidate
- Akshat Bhatia, realtor
- Wing Chow (Republican), retired Certified Public Accountant
- Felipe Delgado (Republican), automation project manager at Fluor Corporation
- Tammy Kim (Democrat), Vice Mayor (2020–2021, 2022–present) of the Irvine City Council (2020–present)
- Ron Scolesdang (Republican), business owner and professional Muay Thai fighter
- Liqing Lee Sun (Democrat), Irvine Finance Commissioner (2022–present) and engineer

==== Withdrawn ====
- Katherine Daigle (Republican), writer and candidate for mayor in 2022 (running for South Orange County Community College District board trustee in Area 1)

=== Endorsements ===
Larry Agran

Organizations

- Council on American–Islamic Relations Action California
Tammy Kim

U.S. Representatives

- Judy Chu, CA-28 (2009–present)
- Andy Kim, NJ-3 (2019–present)
- Grace Meng, NY-6 (2013–present)
- Katie Porter, CA-47 (2019–present)
- Brad Sherman, CA-32 (1997–present)

Statewide officials

- John Chiang, former California State Treasurer (2015–2019)
- Fiona Ma, California State Treasurer (2019–present)
- Betty Yee, California Democratic Party vice chair (2021–present) and former California State Controller (2015–2023)

State senators

- Dave Min, SD-37 (2020–present)

State assemblymembers

- Mike Eng, AD-49 (2006–2012)
- Ash Kalra, AD-25 (2016–present)
- Mike Fong, AD-49 (2022–present)
- Evan Low, AD-49 (2014–present)
- Cottie Petrie-Norris, AD-73 (2018–present)
- Sharon Quirk-Silva, AD-65 (2012–2014, 2016–present)

Municipal officials

- Doug Chaffee, Orange County Supervisor from the 4th district (2019–present)
- Katrina Foley, Orange County Supervisor from the 5th district (2021–present)

Local officials

- Joyce Ahn, Buena Park city councilor (2022–present)
- Ashleigh Aitken, mayor of Anaheim (2022–present)
- Valerie Amezcua, mayor of Santa Ana (2022–present)
- Fred Jung, mayor of Fullerton (2021–2023)
- John Lee, Los Angeles City Councilor from the 12th district (2019–present) (Independent)
- Kim Bernice Nguyen, Garden Grove city councilor (2016–present)
- Paul Seo, Rancho Palos Verdes city councilor (2022–present)
- Kathleen Treseder, Irvine City Councilor (2022–present)

Labor unions

- Orange County Labor Federation

Organizations

- Orange County Young Democrats
- Planned Parenthood Action Fund

Political parties

- Orange County Democratic Party
Ron Scolesdang

Political parties

- Republican Party of Orange County
Lee Sun

Local officials

- Farrah Khan, outgoing mayor of Irvine (2020–present)
Declined to endorse

Political parties

- Democrats of Greater Irvine

=== Fundraising ===
Campaign finance reports as of December 31, 2024 (Note: Raised and spent figures reflect campaign activity during calendar year 2024 only and do not include prior periods.)
Candidate	Raised	Spent	Cash on hand
Tammy Kim (D)	$112,378	$229,318	$4,072
Larry Agran (D)	$117,162	$126,923	$5,652
Liqing Lee Sun (D)	$27,098	$27,098	$0
Ron Scolesdang (R)	$11,795	$10,329	$3,271
Wing Chow (NPP)	$2,240	$1,702	$638
Felipe Delgado (R)	$900	$900	$0
Akshat Bhatia (NPP)	no filing	no filing	no filing
Source: City of Irvine

=== Results ===
2024 Irvine mayoral election
Candidate	Votes	%
Larry Agran	42,652	38.76
Tammy Kim	37,924	34.46
Ron Scolesdang	12,891	11.71
Liqing Lee Sun	6,001	5.45
Felipe Delgado	5,325	4.84
Akshat Bhatia	2,761	2.51
Wing Chow	2,496	2.27
Total votes	110,050	100.0
Invalid or blank votes	13,068	10.6

=== Results by council district ===
Legend
Districts won by Agran
Districts won by Kim

Results by council district
District	Agran		Kim		Scolesdang		Sun		Delgado		Bhatia		Chow		Margin		Total votes
District	Votes	%	Votes	%	Votes	%	Votes	%	Votes	%	Votes	%	Votes	%	Votes	%	Total votes
District 1	7,343	38.46%	6,301	33.00%	2,339	12.25%	1,210	6.34%	789	4.13%	605	3.17%	505	2.65%	1,042	3.82%	19,092
District 2	6,679	36.82%	6,358	35.05%	1,937	10.68%	1,255	6.92%	816	4.50%	668	3.68%	425	2.34%	321	1.77%	18,138
District 3	9,157	41.70%	6,633	30.21%	2,762	12.58%	1,240	5.65%	1,154	5.26%	491	2.24%	521	2.37%	2,524	11.49%	21,958
District 4	6,804	37.16%	6,557	35.81%	2,340	12.78%	918	5.01%	862	4.71%	402	2.2%	428	2.34%	247	1.35%	18,311
District 5	8,232	40.85%	6,796	33.73%	2,484	12.33%	846	4.20%	1,104	5.48%	320	1.59%	369	1.83%	1,436	7.11%	20,151
District 6	4,437	35.78%	5,279	42.57%	1,029	8.30%	532	4.29%	600	4.84%	275	2.22%	248	2.00%	842	6.79%	12,400
Total	42,652	38.76%	37,924	34.46%	12,891	11.71%	6,001	5.45%	5,325	4.84%	2,761	2.51%	2,496	2.27%	4,728	4.30%	110,050

== 2026 ==
2026 Irvine mayoral election
- November 3, 2026
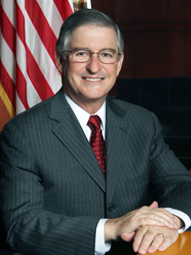

Candidate	Larry Agran	Maksim Egorov
Popular vote	56,566	24,398
Percentage	69.87%	30.13%
Mayor before election
Larry Agran
Elected mayor
Larry Agran

The 2026 Irvine mayoral election was held on November 5, 2026. Incumbent mayor Larry Agran won re-election for the second term.

=== Candidates ===
- Larry Agran (Democratic), incumbent mayor
- Maksim V. Egorov (No Political Party), software engineer

==== Fundraising ====
Campaign finance reports as of September 19, 2026 (Note: Raised and spent figures reflect campaign activity during calendar 2026 only and do not include prior periods.)
Candidate	Raised	Spent	Cash on hand
Larry Agran (D)	$31,783	$12,371	$19,411
Maksim Erogov (NPP)	$3,400	$1,077	$2,473
Source: City of Irvine

=== Results ===
2026 Irvine mayoral election
Candidate	Votes	%
Larry Agran (incumbent)	56,566	69.87
Maksim V. Egorov	24,398	30.13
Total votes	80,964	100.0
Invalid or blank votes	14,515	15.3

=== Results by council district ===
Legend
Districts won by Agran

Results by council district
District	Agran		Egorov		Margin		Total votes
District	Votes	%	Votes	%	Votes	%	Total votes
District 1	9,566	70.00%	4,098	29.99%	5,468	40.00%	13,664
District 2	9,286	69.41%	4,091	30.58%	5,195	38.84%	13,377
District 3	11,364	69.38%	5,015	30.62%	6,349	38.76%	16,379
District 4	8,865	68.14%	4,144	31.85%	4,721	36.29%	13,009
District 5	10,068	67.06%	4,945	32.94%	5,123	34.12%	15,013
District 6	6,873	78.16%	1,921	21.84%	4,952	56.31%	8,794
Total	42,652	69.8%	56,022	30.2%	24,214	11.71%	80,236
