= Steven Choi =

Korean American politician (born 1944)

- 최석호
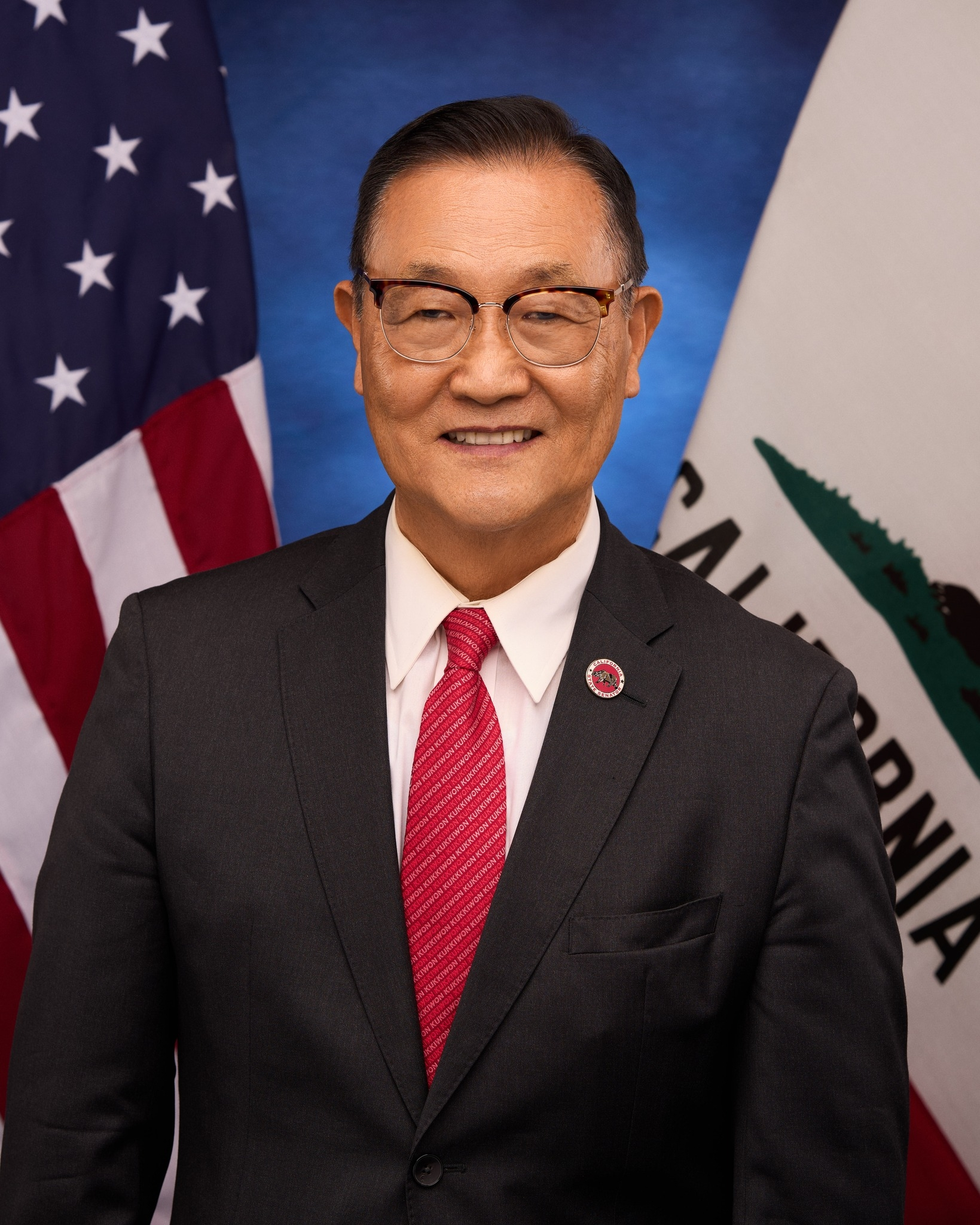
- Official portrait, 2025

Member of the California Senate from the 37th district
- Incumbent
- Assumed office December 2, 2024
- Preceded by: Dave Min

Member of the California State Assembly from the 68th district
- In office December 5, 2016 – November 30, 2022
- Preceded by: Don Wagner
- Succeeded by: Avelino Valencia (redistricted)

Mayor of Irvine
- In office December 11, 2012 – December 5, 2016
- Preceded by: Sukhee Kang
- Succeeded by: Don Wagner

Member of the Irvine City Council
- In office December 14, 2004 – December 11, 2012
- Preceded by: Mike Ward
- Succeeded by: Christina L. Shea

Personal details
- Born: January 15, 1944 (age 82) Naju, Korea, Empire of Japan (now South Korea)
- Party: Republican
- Spouse: Janie Choi
- Children: 2
- Education: Kyung Hee University (BA); Louisiana State University (MS); University of Pittsburgh (PhD)

Korean name
- Hangul: 최석호
- Hanja: 崔錫浩
- RR: Choe Seokho
- MR: Ch'oe Sŏkho
- Steven Choi's voice Steven Choi on celebrating Lunar New Year; Recorded February 4, 2025

Steven Seokho Choi (Korean: 최석호; born January 15, 1944) is a Korean American politician serving as a California State Senator, representing the 37th District since December 2, 2024. A Republican from Orange County, California, he previously served three terms as a California State Assemblymember representing the 68th Assembly District from 2016 to 2022.

Choi previously served two terms as Mayor of Irvine, California from 2012 to 2016. From 2004 to 2012, he served two terms on the Irvine City Council, where he was the first Asian American to have been elected to a four-year term. In 1998, Choi became the first Asian-American elected to the Irvine United School Board, leaving in the middle of his second term when he was elected to the City Council.

== Early life and education ==
Steven Choi was born in 1944 in Naju, Zenranan Province, Korea, Empire of Japan (now in South Korea). Choi earned his B.A. from Kyung Hee University in 1966. In August 1968, Choi moved from South Korea to the United States as a Peace Corps language instructor for the United States Department of State. He then continued his post-graduate education, earning his master's degree in library science from Louisiana State University in 1971 and Ph.D. in library and information science at the University of Pittsburgh in 1976.

== Career ==
=== Educator ===
Choi has taught at several universities and colleges including the University of Southern California; University of California, Irvine; California State University, Los Angeles; Henderson State University; Saddleback College; and most recently Coastline Community College. He founded and serves as director of Dr. Choi's Academy, a tutoring and academic enrichment business.

=== Local government ===
Choi was elected to the Irvine Unified School District Board of Education in 1998 and reelected in 2002. He was elected to the Irvine City Council in 2004, becoming the first Asian American elected to a four-year term on the council. He and Sukhee Kang (elected to a two-year term on the same day) became the first two Asian Americans and Koreans elected to the Irvine City Council. Choi served on the Irvine City Council until 2012, when he defeated councilman Larry Agran in the mayoral election and was elected to a two-year term as Irvine's mayor. He was reelected as mayor in 2014.

The Irvine city council at the time was composed of five members, including the mayor. The council had four Republican members (Choi, Christina Shea, Lynn Schott, and Jeff Lalloway) and one Democratic member (Beth Krom). During the course of new sister city negotiations, he successfully opposed the One-China principle demanded by Shanghai's Xuhui government in the People's Republic of China, which would have required Irvine to abandon its existing long-term sister city relationship with Taoyuan, Taiwan.

Choi served as Chairman of the Orange County Public Library Advisory Board, which consisted of mayors and city council members from 27 cities within Orange County, and he was also Chairman of the Irvine Library Advisory Committee. He served on the Orange County Great Park Corporation Board, where he pushed for construction of an Orange County/City Metropolitan Library at the Great Park. He also served on the boards of the Irvine Redevelopment Agency, the Orange County Sanitation District Board and other countywide committees.

In addition, Choi was a member of the Concordia University President's Advisory Council and was Irvine's representative to Growth Management Areas 4 and 9 and the Newport Bay Watershed Executive Committee. He formerly represented the 71st Assembly District on the Orange County Republican Party Central Committee. On June 3, 2008, he became the only incumbent to not be re-elected to the Orange County Republican Party Central Committee, coming in seventh with only 6.5% of the available vote. He was also a member of the Local Elected Officials Association and the 400 Club.

=== State Legislature ===
In 2010, Choi sought election to the California State Assembly, but narrowly lost the Republican primary to Donald P. Wagner, who went on to win the general election.

In 2016, Choi won election to the California State Assembly, narrowly defeating Anaheim City Councilman Harry Sidhu in the primary and winning the general election with 60% of the vote to replace Wagner, who in turn won election as Mayor of Irvine, replacing Choi.

In 2024, Choi won election to the California State Senate, narrowly defeating Senator Josh Newman in an upset.

== Personal life ==
With his wife, Janie, and their two children, Choi has lived in Irvine since 1993. He previously lived in Mission Viejo from 1981 until 1993. Both of their children attended public schools in the Irvine Unified School District. His son, Daniel, is a physician at Kaiser Permanente in Orange County. His daughter, Michelle, is an attorney working in Irvine.

== Electoral history ==
=== 1998 ===
Irvine Unified School District Election, 1998
| Candidate | Votes | % |
|---|---|---|
| Margie Wakeham | 17,808 | 33.2 |
| Steven S. Choi | 9,418 | 17.6 |
| Sue Banes | 6,615 | 12.3 |
| Ellen Lee | 5,547 | 10.3 |
| Kevin J. McElroy | 5,494 | 10.3 |
| Rob Wolf | 3,125 | 5.8 |
| Lance Neal | 2,629 | 4.9 |
| Peter R. Rundle | 1,419 | 2.6 |
| Atiya Akbar | 949 | 1.8 |
| John E. York | 591 | 1.1 |
| Total votes | 53,595 | 100 |

=== 2002 ===
Irvine Unified School District Election, 2002
| Candidate | Votes | % |
|---|---|---|
| Sharon Wallin | 20,978 | 40.1 |
| Steven Choi (Incumbent) | 15,007 | 28.7 |
| Ruth Sanchez | 7,235 | 13.8 |
| Mark S. Schuk | 6,198 | 11.8 |
| Craig Shankman | 2,911 | 5.6 |
| Total votes | 52,329 | 100 |

=== 2004 ===
Irvine City Council Election, 2004
| Candidate | Votes | % |
|---|---|---|
| Larry Agran | 25,210 | 16.9 |
| Steven Choi | 25,052 | 16.8 |
| Sukhee Kang | 24,642 | 16.5 |
| Debbie Coven | 24,261 | 16.2 |
| Mike House | 22,561 | 15.1 |
| Greg Smith | 22,326 | 14.9 |
| Mohsen Alinaghian | 5,336 | 3.6 |
| Total votes | 149,388 | 100 |

=== 2008 ===
Irvine City Council Election, 2008
| Candidate | Votes | % |
|---|---|---|
| Beth Krom | 36,924 | 19.5 |
| Steven Choi (Incumbent) | 28,886 | 15.3 |
| Larry Agran (Incumbent) | 28,157 | 14.9 |
| Margie Wakeham | 22,669 | 12.0 |
| Todd Gallinger | 22,423 | 11.9 |
| Patrick Rodgers | 22,093 | 11.7 |
| Eric Johnson | 11,022 | 5.8 |
| Bea Foster | 10,877 | 5.8 |
| Ruby Roung | 3,697 | 2.0 |
| Paris Merriam | 2,354 | 1.2 |
| Total votes | 189,102 | 100 |

=== 2010 ===
California's 70th State Assembly district Republican primary election, 2010
| Party | Candidate | Votes | % |
|---|---|---|---|
| Republican | Donald P. Wagner | 15,862 | 32.8 |
| Republican | Steven Choi | 14,569 | 30.1 |
| Republican | Jerry Amante | 11,660 | 24.1 |
| Republican | Jay Ferguson | 6,341 | 13.1 |

=== 2012 ===
City of Irvine mayoral election, 2012
| Candidate | Votes | % |
|---|---|---|
| Steven Choi | 32,505 | 45.7 |
| Larry Agran | 28,741 | 40.4 |
| Katherine Daigle | 9,951 | 13.9 |
| Total votes | 71,197 | |

=== 2014 ===
City of Irvine mayoral election, 2014
| Candidate | Votes | % |
|---|---|---|
| Steven Choi (incumbent) | 18,333 | 45.4 |
| Mary Ann Gaido | 17,380 | 43.0 |
| Katherine Daigle | 4,698 | 11.6 |
| Total votes | 40,411 | |

=== 2016 ===
2016 California State Assembly 68th district election
Primary election
| Party | Candidate | Votes | % |
|---|---|---|---|
| Democratic | Sean Jay Panahi | 32,610 | 33.0 |
| Republican | Steven Choi | 19,559 | 19.8 |
| Republican | Harry Sidhu | 19,405 | 19.7 |
| Republican | Deborah Pauly | 13,880 | 14.1 |
| Republican | Alexia Deligianni-Brydges | 5,098 | 5.2 |
| No party preference | Brian Chuchua | 4,635 | 4.7 |
| Republican | Kostas Roditis | 3,528 | 3.6 |
| Total votes | | 98,715 | 100.0 |
General election
| Republican | Steven Choi | 114,210 | 60.3 |
| Democratic | Sean Jay Panahi | 75,231 | 39.7 |
| Total votes | | 189,441 | 100.0 |
| Republican hold | | | |

=== 2018 ===
2018 California State Assembly 68th district election
Primary election
| Party | Candidate | Votes | % |
|---|---|---|---|
| Republican | Steven Choi (incumbent) | 57,099 | 59.0 |
| Democratic | Michelle Duman | 39,751 | 41.0 |
| Total votes | | 96,850 | 100.0 |
General election
| Republican | Steven Choi (incumbent) | 96,611 | 53.1 |
| Democratic | Michelle Duman | 85,164 | 46.9 |
| Total votes | | 181,775 | 100.0 |
| Republican hold | | | |

=== 2020 ===
2020 California State Assembly 68th district election
Primary election
| Party | Candidate | Votes | % |
|---|---|---|---|
| Republican | Steven Choi (incumbent) | 44,165 | 44.9 |
| Democratic | Melissa Fox | 32,278 | 32.8 |
| Democratic | Eugene Fields | 12,543 | 12.7 |
| Republican | Benjamin Yu | 9,468 | 9.6 |
| Total votes | | 98,454 | 100.0 |
General election
| Republican | Steven Choi (incumbent) | 136,841 | 53.1 |
| Democratic | Melissa Fox | 120,965 | 46.9 |
| Total votes | | 257,806 | 100.0 |
| Republican hold | | | |

=== 2022 ===
2022 California State Assembly 73rd district election
Primary election
| Party | Candidate | Votes | % |
|---|---|---|---|
| Democratic | Cottie Petrie-Norris (incumbent) | 44,890 | 56.2 |
| Republican | Steven Choi (incumbent) | 34,957 | 43.8 |
| Total votes | | 79,847 | 100.0 |
General election
| Democratic | Cottie Petrie-Norris (incumbent) | 75,950 | 55.8 |
| Republican | Steven Choi (incumbent) | 60,212 | 44.2 |
| Total votes | | 136,162 | 100.0 |
| Democratic gain from Republican | | | |

=== 2024 ===
2024 California State Senate 37th district election
Primary election
| Party | Candidate | Votes | % |
|---|---|---|---|
| Democratic | Josh Newman (incumbent) | 67,109 | 30.1 |
| Republican | Steven Choi | 48,364 | 21.7 |
| Republican | Crystal Miles | 31,132 | 14.0 |
| Republican | Guy Selleck | 22,546 | 10.1 |
| Democratic | Alex Mohajer | 18,550 | 8.3 |
| Republican | Anthony C. Kuo | 15,739 | 7.1 |
| Democratic | Leticia Correa | 6,000 | 2.7 |
| Democratic | Stephanie Le | 4,532 | 2.0 |
| Democratic | Gabrielle Ashbaugh | 4,396 | 2.0 |
| Democratic | Jenny Suarez | 3,191 | 1.4 |
| Democratic | Jacob Niles Creer | 1,606 | 0.7 |
| Total votes | | 223,165 | 100.0 |
General election
| Republican | Steven Choi | 232,345 | 50.7 |
| Democratic | Josh Newman (incumbent) | 226,270 | 49.3 |
| Total votes | | 458,615 | 100.0 |
| Republican gain from Democratic | | | |

== See also ==
- History of the Korean Americans in Los Angeles
