= Sukhee Kang =

American politician (born 1952)

- 강석희
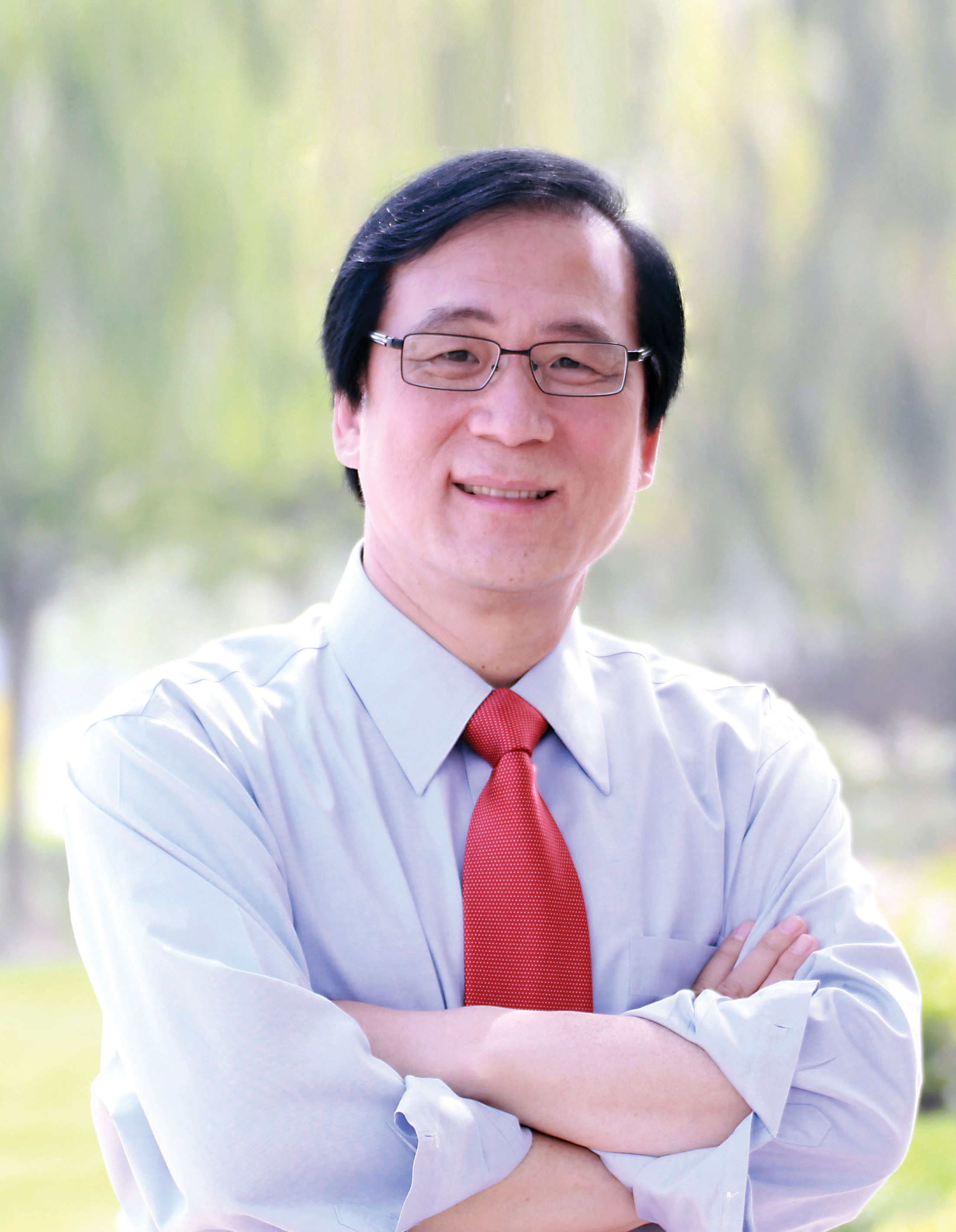

Region 9 & 10 Administrator at General Services Administration
- In office January 2023 – January 2025
- President: Joe Biden

Mayor of Irvine
- In office 9 December 2008 – 11 December 2012
- Preceded by: Beth Krom
- Succeeded by: Steven Choi

Member of the Irvine City Council
- In office 14 December 2004 – 9 December 2008

Personal details
- Born: September 15, 1952 (age 74) Seoul, South Korea
- Party: Democratic
- Spouse: Joanne Kang (1977–present)
- Education: Korea University
- Profession: Politician, Small Businessman

Korean name
- Hangul: 강석희
- RR: Gang Seokhui
- MR: Kang Sŏkhŭi

Sukhee Kang (Korean: 강석희; born 15 September 1952) is an American Democratic Party politician from Orange County, California. From 2008 to 2012, Kang served as Mayor of Irvine, California, the first Korean American to serve as mayor of a major American city.

Born and educated in South Korea, Kang immigrated to Southern California and became involved in civic life following the 1992 Los Angeles riots. Kang was elected to the Irvine City Council twice, serving from 2004 to 2008. Kang was elected twice to Mayor of Irvine, serving from 2008 to 2012.

In 2012 Kang was an unsuccessful candidate for the United States House of Representatives, and in 2016 he was an unsuccessful candidate for the California State Senate. In 2023 he was appointed Regional Administrator for the General Services Administration.

== Early life and education ==
Kang was born at Yeji-dong near Jongno 5-ga in Seoul, South Korea, to merchant parents from the city of Kaesong, in what is now North Korea. He served military draft duty in the Republic of Korea Army from 1973-75 and immigrated to the United States in June 1977 from South Korea after receiving his bachelor's degree in agricultural economics from Korea University in Seongbuk District, Seoul. When he was in a college, he joined the English debating club named Seoul PTC (Pine Tree Club) and served as the president from 1971-72. He received an honorary doctoral degree in Business Administration from Dongseo University in Busan, South Korea in March 2011.

== Career ==
=== Early career and activism ===
Kang began his professional career at Circuit City as a sales and customer service representative; he worked with Circuit City for 15 years, from 1977 until 1992. Since 1992, Kang volunteered at the Korean American Scholarship Foundation (KASF), the Korean American Community Fund (KACF), the Orange County Branch of Korean American Corporation, and served as the president of the Korean American Democratic Committee (KADC).

=== Entrance into politics ===
Kang first got involved in politics following the 1992 Los Angeles riots, during which more than 750 Korean businesses suffered extensive losses. Following the riots, Kang took on a more active role in civic and community affairs, and served as Chairman of the Korean American Coalition of Orange County and the Korean American Scholarship Foundation, Western Region.

Prior to his service on the Irvine City Council, Kang was a Governor's appointee on the California Workforce Investment Board and was the Mayor's appointee to the Irvine Finance Commission.

In November 2004, he was elected Irvine City Councilmember, and was re-elected in November 2006. He served twice as the Mayor Pro Tem. Kang served as a member of the Orange County Great Park Board, Orange County Sanitation District Board, Transportation Corridor Agency Board, Executive Steering Committee of the League of California Cities Orange County Division, and Orange County Transportation Authority Measure M Super Committee.

=== Mayor of Irvine ===
In November 2008 Sukhee Kang defeated Christina L. Shea, a Republican councilwoman, with 52.2% of the vote, to become the first Korean American to serve as mayor of a major U.S. city.

Kang was elected to a second term in November 2010 after defeating Christopher Gonzales, a Republican Party candidate, with 63.21% of the vote.

As mayor, Kang backed a $120 million deal with the Orange County Transportation Authority to lay the groundwork for a citywide public transit system.

Kang endorsed the Northwood Gratitude and Honor Memorial and worked to achieve the unanimous Irvine City Council vote for its approval in December, 2009. The Northwood Gratitude and Honor Memorial, dedicated on 14 November 2010, has 5,714 names of U.S. service members that lost their lives in Iraq and Afghanistan. It will be updated annually as needed.

=== Post mayoralty ===
In 2012, Kang ran for United States Congress in the 45th House District. Kang advanced from the primary election, but lost to incumbent John Campbell in the general election. In 2016, Kang ran for the California State Senate in the 29th district, but lost in the jungle primary.

In January 2023, President Biden appointed Kang Regional Administrator for the General Services Administration. Kang's region includes: Arizona, California, Nevada, Alaska, Idaho, Oregon, Washington, American Samoa, East Asia, and Guam.

== Personal life ==
Sukhee Kang is married to his wife Joanne Kang (née Choi) in 1977.

Sukhee was honored by the Father's Day Council of Orange County as Father of the year in 2012.

== Electoral history ==
2008 Irvine mayoral election
Candidate	Votes	%
Sukhee Kang	27,534	52.2
Christina L. Shea	25,189	47.8

2010 Irvine mayoral election
Candidate	Votes	%
Sukhee Kang	23,841	63.2
Christopher Gonzales	13,879	36.8

Open Primary Election June 5, 2012, U.S. House of Representatives, California's 45th District
Party	Candidate	Votes	%
Republican	John Campbell	54,346	51.0
Democratic	Sukhee Kang	35,182	33.0
Republican	John Webb	17,014	16.0
Turnout			

General Election November 6, 2012, U.S. House of Representatives, California's 45th District
Party	Candidate	Votes	%
Republican	John Campbell	170,339	58.5
Democratic	Sukhee Kang	120,831	41.5
Turnout			

Open Primary Election June 7, 2016, California's 29th State Senate district
Primary election
Party	Candidate	Votes	%
Republican	Ling Ling Chang	73,514	44.0%
Democratic	Josh Newman	48,754	29.2%
Democratic	Sukhee Kang	44,766	26.8%
Total votes		167,034	100.0
