= West Irvine, Irvine, California =

West Irvine
- Neighborhood
- Location within the Los Angeles metropolitan area Location within California
- Coordinates: 33.7378°N 117.7740°W
- Country: United States
- State: California
- County: Orange
- City: Irvine

Area
  - Total: 0.6 sq mi (1.6 km^{2})

Population
  - Total: 22,871
- Time zone: UTC-8
  - Summer (DST): UTC-7
- ZIP: 92602
- Area code: 949

West Irvine is a neighborhood in Irvine, California. It is bounded by Jamboree Road to the northwest, California State Route 261 to the southeast, and Irvine Boulevard to the southwest. Despite its name, West Irvine is located in the northern reach of the city, bordering Tustin. The neighborhood was named for its location west of the Northwood and Northpark neighborhoods. West Irvine is adjacent to The Market Place, a major shopping center in the region.

The West Irvine area contains 8,413 homes with an average home value of US$819,000. The average household size is 2.72 people and the median household income in 2019 was US$100,745.

== Demographics ==
Census Information
Average age of homeowners	45
Homeowners	69%
Total population	11,326

== Amenities, facilities, and neighborhoods ==
=== Neighborhoods ===
- Amberwood
- Barrington
- Briarwood
- Concord
- Glen Willows
- Heritage
- Ivywood
- Legacy
- Liberty
- Sheridan Square
- Traditions
- Wisteria

=== Governmental services ===
The Orange County Fire Authority is headquartered in West Irvine, sandwiched between Jamboree Road and SR-261 in a peninsula of the neighborhood's jurisdiction. OC Parks, the managing organization of Orange County's public parks, has their headquarters and a plaza of several relocated historical homes situated in the neighborhood.

=== Transportation ===
Orange County Transportation Authority serves the area with buses. Along with the neighborhood's proximity to the SR-261 toll road, Interstate 5 is on the opposite side of the adjacent Market Place shopping center.
