= Donald P. Wagner =

American politician

Don Wagner
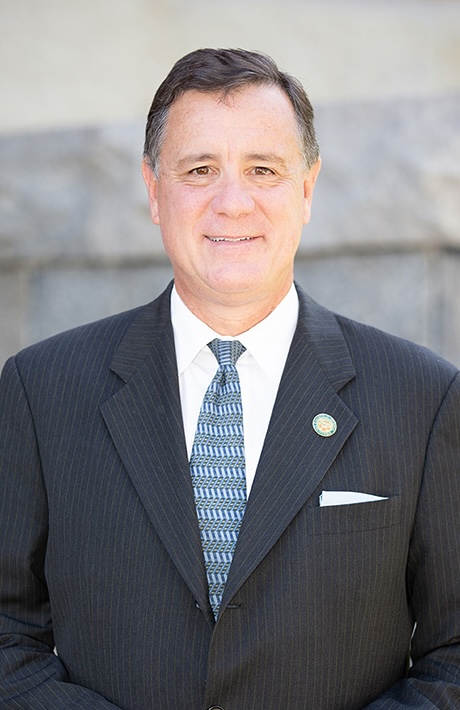
- Official portrait, 2022

Member of the Orange County Board of Supervisors from the 3rd district
- Incumbent
- Assumed office March 27, 2019
- Preceded by: Todd Spitzer

Chair of the Orange County Board of Supervisors
- In office January 10, 2023 – January 14, 2025
- Preceded by: Doug Chaffee
- Succeeded by: Doug Chaffee

Mayor of Irvine
- In office December 13, 2016 – March 26, 2019
- Preceded by: Steven Choi
- Succeeded by: Christina L. Shea

Member of the California State Assembly
- In office December 6, 2010 – November 30, 2016
- Preceded by: Chuck DeVore
- Succeeded by: Steven Choi
- Constituency: 70th district (2010–2012); 68th district (2012–2016)

Personal details
- Born: December 3, 1960 (age 65) Pittsburgh, Pennsylvania, U.S.
- Party: Republican
- Spouse: Megan Wagner
- Children: 3
- Education: University of California, Los Angeles (BA); University of California, Hastings (JD)
- Website: Office website Campaign website

Donald P. Wagner (born December 3, 1960) is an American politician, currently serving as a member of the Orange County Board of Supervisors for the 3rd district and chair. He previously served as mayor of Irvine, California and as a Republican member of the California State Assembly, representing the 68th district, which includes portions of Orange County. In 2019, Wagner won a seat as a nonpartisan representative on the Orange County Board of Supervisors, representing District 3.

Wagner was the Republican nominee for secretary of state of California in the 2026 election and was defeated by incumbent Democratic secretary of state Shirley Weber.

== Education and family ==
Wagner received a bachelor's degree in English from the University of California, Los Angeles, and a Juris Doctor in 1987 from the University of California, Hastings College of the Law and was admitted to the California Bar in the same year.

Wagner is married to Orange County Superior Court Judge Megan Wagner, and he and his family reside in Irvine, California.

== Legal career ==
Wagner was an attorney for Kindel and Anderson from 1987 to 1993, and for Wagner and Associates from 1993 to 1998. He has been an attorney for Wagner Lautsch Limited Liability Partnership since 1998.

Wagner served on several committees or advisory boards for the Orange County Bar Association and as a Judge Pro Tempore in the Superior Court of Orange County. He founded and served as the first president of the Orange County Chapter of the Federalist Society.

== Early political career ==
First elected in 1998, Wagner served three terms as a member of the South Orange County Community College District Board of Trustees.

In 2004, he sought election to the California State Assembly but lost the primary to Chuck DeVore.

== California State Assemblyman ==
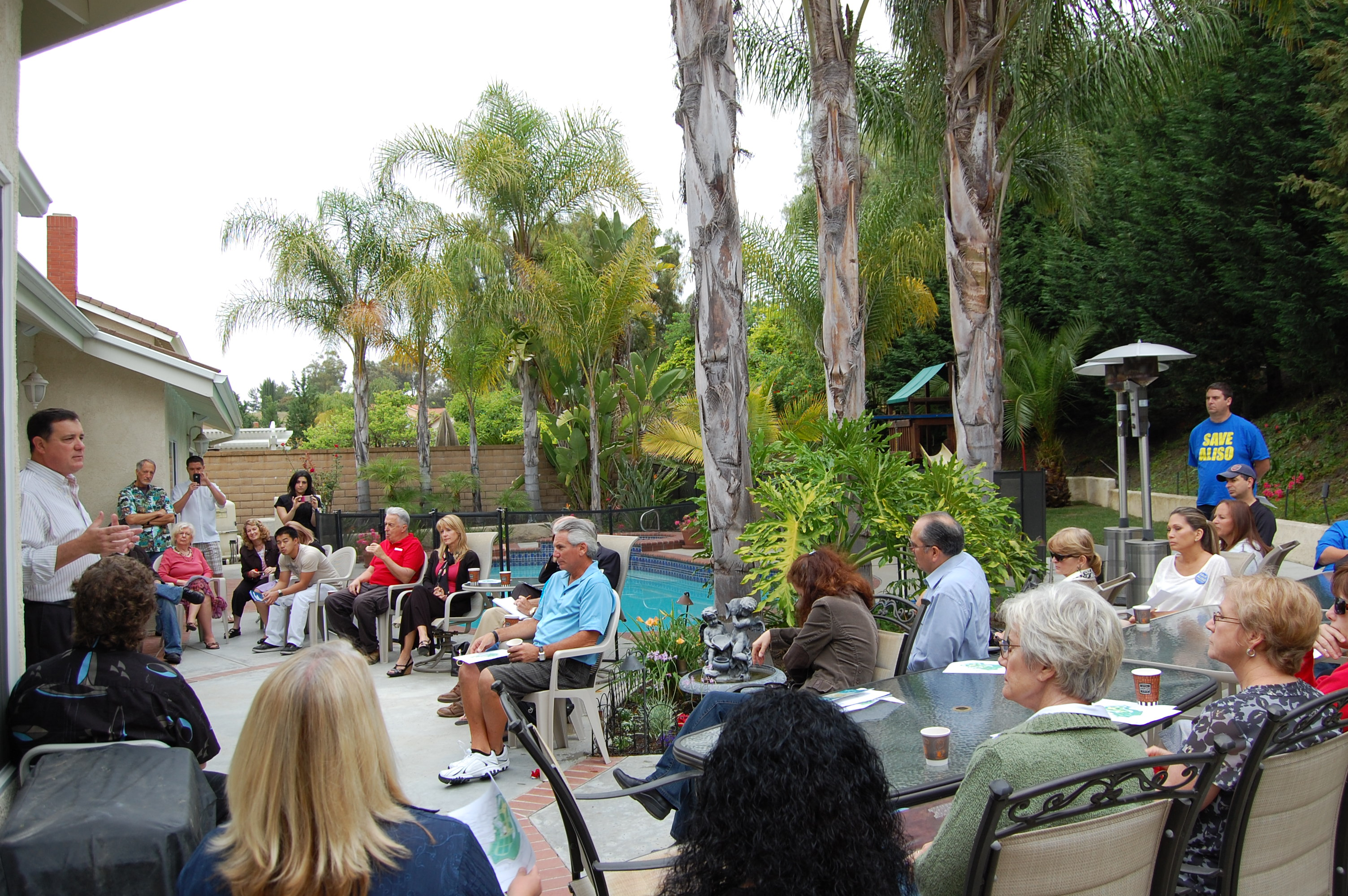
Assemblyman Wagner speaking at a town coffee meet at Lake Forest, CA.

In 2010, Wagner narrowly won the Republican primary election for the 70th Assembly District over Irvine City Councilman Steven Choi. He then won the general election with 58.2% of the votes.

For the 2011–2012 legislative session, Wagner was appointed to these committees:

- Aging and Long-Term Care Committee
- Appropriations Committee
- Budget Committee
- Education Committee
- Judiciary Committee – Vice Chair

In 2013, he sought election to the California State Senate to succeed Mimi Walters, who was elected to the United States House of Representatives the prior year. He lost the special election to Orange County Supervisor John Moorlach.

=== Political ratings ===
- Project Vote Smart provides the following results from legislative scorecards.
- NRA Political Victory Fund – "A-" in 2014

== Mayor of Irvine ==
Wagner won the 2016 Irvine mayoral election, and won reelection in the 2018 Irvine mayoral election. He won the Orange County Third District Supervisorial seat in 2019, and currently holds the seat.

== Orange County Board of Supervisors ==
Shortly after taking office in 2019, Supervisor Wagner successfully brought together four large entities to negotiate the reopening of a public resource known as Irvine Lake for shoreline fishing. The Orange County Register named him one of OC's Most Influential People in 2019 in recognition for his leadership at the Board. Wagner stated public safety is also a top priority of his. In 2020, he helped allocate funding to process a 30-year sexual assault kit backlog at the County of Orange, which led to the prosecution of a longtime sex offender and several individuals placed on national sex offender registries. The county identified 1,705 unprocessed rape kits and cleared the backlog in June 2022.

=== COVID-19 vaccine comments ===
In April 2021, Wagner inquired about whether COVID-19 vaccines contained "tracking devices" in response to constituents and public commentators making claims falsely asserting so. This led to public controversy with people accusing Wagner of promoting these claims. In response, Wagner has denied that this was the case and stated that he does not believe in "vaccine conspiracies," while demanding retractions from various media outlets and individuals for publishing what he asserted was "misinformation." Several media outlets later updated their stories by verifying sources, including a quote from Dr. Chau, who made a clarifying statement that his reaction was at the public commentators and not at Wagner.

=== Andrew Do corruption case ===
Wagner defended Supervisor Andrew Do in 2024 when allegations regarding his abuse of public funds surfaced, citing "there's nothing illegal about what was done". During the same session, he blocked a reform proposal that require members on the board to disclose close family connections to groups they award money to. Do is currently serving a five-prison sentence after pleading guilty.

== Electoral history ==
=== 1998 ===
South Orange County Community College District Seat 2, 1998
Candidate	Votes	%
Donald P. Wagner	90,061	53.0
Charles W. Maddox	58,209	34.2
Douglas M. Chapman	21,774	12.8

=== 2004 ===
California's 70th State Assembly district Republican primary election, 2004
Party	Candidate	Votes	%
Republican	Chuck DeVore	25,248	46.3
Republican	Cristi Cristich	14,363	26.3
Republican	Donald P. Wagner	8,146	14.9
Republican	Marianne Zippi	4,501	8.3
Republican	Long K. Pham	1,709	3.1
Republican	Chonchol D. Gupta	544	1.0

=== 2010 ===
California's 70th State Assembly district Republican primary election, 2010
Party	Candidate	Votes	%
Republican	Donald P. Wagner	15,862	32.8
Republican	Steven Choi	14,569	30.1
Republican	Jerry Amante	11,660	24.1
Republican	Jay Ferguson	6,341	13.1

California's 70th State Assembly district general election, 2010
Party	Candidate	Votes	%
Republican	Donald P. Wagner	89,636	58.2
Democratic	Melissa Fox	58,208	37.8
Libertarian	Deborah Tharp	6,212	4.0
Total votes		154,056	100.0
Republican hold			

=== 2012 ===
California's 68th State Assembly district election, 2012
Primary election
Party	Candidate	Votes	%
Republican	Don Wagner (incumbent)	43,241	69.2
Democratic	Christina Avalos	19,254	30.8
Total votes		62,495	100.0
General election
Republican	Don Wagner (incumbent)	104,706	60.8
Democratic	Christina Avalos	67,448	39.2
Total votes		172,154	100.0
Republican hold			

=== 2014 ===
California's 68th State Assembly district election, 2014
Primary election
Party	Candidate	Votes	%
Republican	Donald P. Wagner (incumbent)	35,223	69.7
Democratic	Anne Cameron	15,297	30.3
Total votes		50,520	100.0
General election
Republican	Donald P. Wagner (incumbent)	66,445	68.4
Democratic	Anne Cameron	30,749	31.6
Total votes		97,194	100.0
Republican hold			

=== 2015 ===
2015 California State Senate 37th district special election Vacancy resulting from the resignation of Mimi Walters
Primary election
Party	Candidate	Votes	%
Republican	John Moorlach	38,125	50.3
Republican	Don Wagner	33,411	44.0
Republican	Naz Namazi	2,261	3.5
Democratic	Louise Stewardson (write-in)	1,696	2.2
Total votes		75,493	100.0
Republican hold			

=== 2016 ===
City of Irvine mayoral election, 2016
Candidate	Votes	%
Donald P. Wagner	30,002	37.7
Mary Ann Gaido	26,278	33.0
Gang Chen	11,816	14.8
Katherine Daigle	8,299	10.4
David Chey	3,206	4.0
Total votes	79,601	

=== 2018 ===
City of Irvine mayoral election, 2018
Candidate	Votes	%
Donald P. Wagner (incumbent)	35,592	45.3%
Ed Pope	24,682	31.4%
Katherine Daigle	13,018	16.6%
Ing Tiong	5,341	6.8%
Total votes	78,633	100%

=== 2019 ===
Orange County Board of Supervisors 3rd district special election, 2019
Party	Candidate	Votes	%
Republican	Donald P. Wagner	30,240	42.0
Democratic	Loretta Sanchez	26,708	37.1
Republican	Kristine "Kris" Murray	5,338	7.4
Republican	Larry Bales	3,912	5.4
Republican	Deborah Pauly	3,847	5.3
Republican	Kim-Thy "Katie" Hoang Bayliss	1,366	1.9
Republican	Katherine Daigle	597	0.8
Total votes		72,008	100.0
Republican hold			

=== 2020 ===
Orange County Board of Supervisors 3rd district, 2020
Party	Candidate	Votes	%
Republican	Donald P. Wagner (incumbent)	80,544	52.3
Democratic	Ashleigh Aitken	73,334	47.7
Total votes		153,878	100.0
Republican hold			

=== 2024 ===
Orange County Board of Supervisors 3rd district, 2024
Party	Candidate	Votes	%
Republican	Donald P. Wagner (incumbent)	97,706	63.5
Democratic	Farrah Khan	56,207	36.5
Total votes		153,913	100.0
Republican hold			

=== 2026 ===
California Secretary of State Primary Election, 2026
Party	Candidate	Votes	%
Democratic	Shirley Weber (incumbent)	5,092,487	58.70
Republican	Donald P. Wagner	3,187,173	36.74
Green	Michael Feinstein	207,600	2.39
Green	Gary Blenner	187,924	2.17
Total votes		8,670,568	100.0
