= Voice of OC =

Online news agency covering Orange County, California, United States

- Founded: June 2009
- Purpose: Local Investigative Journalism
- Location: Santa Ana, California
- Region served: Orange County, California, United States
- Key people: Norberto Santana, Jr., Publisher; Spencer Custodio, Civic Editor; Meg Waters, Development Director; Theresa Sears, Involvement Editor; Wylie Aitken, Chairman of the Board
- Website: voiceofoc.org

Voice of OC is a small, local, non-profit, online news agency reporting on local issues covering Orange County, California.

Its coverage range from topics such as transportation, the environment, social justice, health, public safety, housing, homelessness, politics, to the Ralph M. Brown Act and California Public Records Act issues.

Funding for the Voice of OC is primarily provided through member contributions and grants.

== History ==
Voice of OC was founded by former Orange County Register investigative reporter Norberto Santana in June 2009 with an initial annual budget of $600,000. The agency's board of directors was then chaired by Joe Dunn, a former Democratic state senator from Santa Ana, CA.

It started publishing March 31, 2010. Through its first 4 years, its reporters have written 3,500 news stories.

In 2014, the website entered content-sharing partnership with the Orange County Register.

In 2015, Norberto Santana moved from being an editor-in-chief to being the publisher.

In November 2022, Google selected the Voice of OC as one of its 450 news organizations that will receive funding for Google News Equity Fund, which focuses on small and medium-sized, independent news organizations focusing on underserved audiences.

== Notable reporting ==
In 2021, the agency covered an oil spill in Huntington Beach, CA in much detail.

The news agency's reporting on a property swap involving Santa Ana Mayor Miguel Pulido prompted an investigation by the city attorney into the issue. The mayor voted for a $1.4-million city contract with an auto parts firm, NAPA Orange County, just over a year after he bought a home from the firm's owner for $230,000 less than fair market value.

In February 2023, a day after the news agency reported on a state investigation into CalOptima's hiring and pay practices including controversially large salary hikes, CalOptima chair Andrew Do abruptly resigned as chair.

== Awards ==
The Voice of OC has received numerous journalistic awards including:

- In 2021, Voice of OC reporter Kristina Garcia won third place for the Best Arts & Culture Story in the 2021 Orange County Press Club Awards.
- In 2021, Voice of OC photographer Julie Leopo was selected by Latino Journalists of California as one of the most influential Latina journalists across the state
- In 2021, the Voice of OC won 18 awards in the California News Publishers Association awards contest.
- In 2021, Lion Publishers awarded Voice of OC the Publisher of the Year noting that the "Voice of OC is one of the standard bearers of nonprofit journalism for good reason."
- In April 2022, publisher and editor-in-chief Norberto Santana Jr. was selected the winner of the 2022 Robert G. McGruder Award for Diversity Leadership.
- In 2022, Voice of OC was a recipient of the 2022 Google News Equity Fund

== Board members ==
- Wylie Aitken, an Orange County-based trial attorney and philanthropist who is a past president of the California Trial Lawyers Association and member of the California Arts Council
- Barbara Venezia, a journalist (Daily Pilot, Orange County Register), author, producer and podcast host
- Erwin Chemerinsky, dean of the UC Irvine School of Law
- Colleen Clark, a finance professional with more than 25 years’ experience
- Norberto Santana, Jr., publisher of Voice of OC
