= OC Parks =

Park management agency in Orange County, California

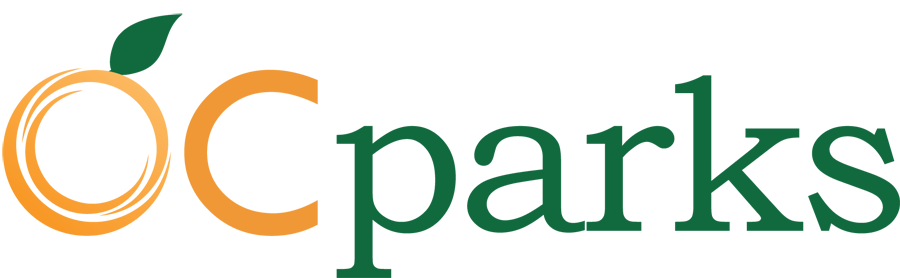

Department overview
- Formed: 1922; 104 years ago
- Jurisdiction: Orange County
- Headquarters: 13042 Old Myford Rd; Irvine, California 92602; 33.4348°N 117.4705°W
- Employees: 200 (2020)
- Annual budget: US$90,018,793 (2015-16)
- Department executive: Stacy Blackwood, Director
- Website: ocparks.com

Orange County Parks, more commonly abbreviated to OC Parks, is a government agency that maintains and oversees the public parks of Orange County, California. OC Parks is responsible for 60,000 acres (24,000 ha) of inland and coastal open space that collectively receives millions of visitors every year.

== Operations ==
=== Wilderness parks ===
OC Parks manages several wilderness parks:

- Aliso and Wood Canyons Wilderness Park, Aliso Viejo
- Ronald W. Caspers Wilderness Park, San Juan Capistrano
- Featherly Regional Park, Santa Ana
- Irvine Lake
- Irvine Ranch Open Space (a category of parks)
- Laguna Coast Wilderness Park, Laguna Beach
- Limestone Canyon Regional Park
- O'Neill Regional Park
- Thomas F. Riley Wilderness Park, Coto De Caza
- Peters Canyon Regional Park, Orange
- Santiago Oaks Regional Park, Orange
- Talbert Regional Park, Costa Mesa
- Whiting Ranch Wilderness Park
- Upper Newport Bay, Newport Beach

=== Urban parks ===
OC Parks is in charge of many manmade or partially manmade parks in urban settings:

- Carbon Canyon Regional Park, Brea
- Ralph B. Clark Regional Park, Buena Park
- Ted Craig Regional Park, Fullerton
- Irvine Regional Park, Orange
- Laguna Niguel Regional Park
- William R. Mason Regional Park, Irvine
- Mile Square Regional Park, Fountain Valley
- Tri-City Regional Park, Placentia
- Harriett M. Wieder Regional Park, Huntington Beach
- Yorba Regional Park, Anaheim
