= Limestone Canyon Regional Park =

Park in Orange County, California

- Location within southern California
- Location: Orange County, California, United States
- Nearest city: Lake Forest, Irvine
- Coordinates: 33°43′56″N 117°41′21″W
- Area: 4,000 acres (16 km^{2})
- Operator: OC Parks
- Website: OC Parks

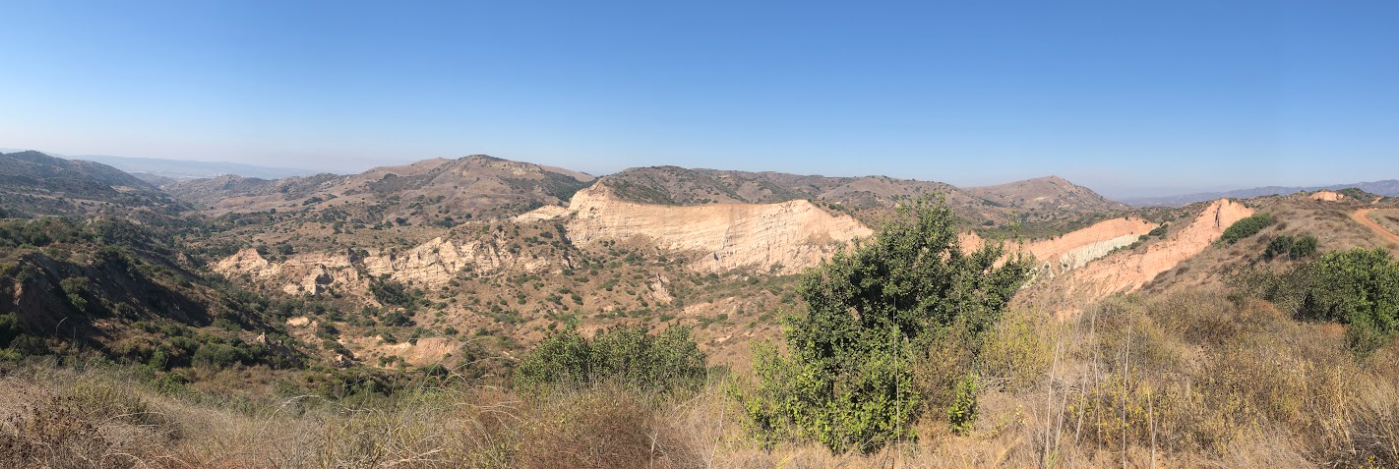
View of The Sinks from the east, on Limestone Ridge Rd

Limestone Canyon Regional Park is a public regional park in southern Orange County, California under the management of OC Parks. The 4,000-acre park is a part of the Irvine Ranch Open Space, a designation of preserved natural landmarks in Southern California. The premises is near Santiago Canyon and at the foothills of the Santa Ana Mountains, making it a neighbor to the Cleveland National Forest. The park is just outside of the cities of Lake Forest and Irvine and is accessible via County Route S18. Limestone Canyon borders Whiting Ranch Wilderness Park, another regional park in the area. The region was privately owned by The Irvine Company until it was donated to the county in June 2010, along with 20,000 acres of what was Irvine Ranch.

As its name suggests, Limestone Canyon Regional Park is known for its limestone cliffs and oak woodland environment that fills the canyon floor. Locally known as "The Sinks", the landform has been heralded as a "mini Grand Canyon". The site is commonly utilized by hikers and mountain bikers.

== History ==
Frank R. Bowerman Landfill, a landfill opened in 1990, sits directly adjacent to the Loma Ridge trail of the park. The 725-acre facility is the ninth-largest landfill in the United States and primarily serves the cities of Irvine and Lake Forest. Taking in approximately 8,500 tons of waste per day, experts expect that the landfill will be in use until 2053. Despite being close to Limestone Canyon's boundaries and being separated from the rest of Irvine by the 241 and 133 highways, the landfill is not associated with the park and is listed as being in Irvine.

Parts of Limestone Canyon as well as neighboring Agua Chinon Creek in a 6.1-acre designation were part of a 5-year project that saw the removal of invasive species and a full restoration to the area's native environment. Not long after the project's completion, sections of vegetation in the area were burned by the Silverado Fire. A "checkerboard pattern" of damage was left as some vegetation was burnt while others nearby weren't, and some cacti were even only halfway burnt.
