= Mile Square Regional Park =

Park in Fountain Valley, California, US

Coordinates: 33.724°N 117.945°W

Mile Square Regional Park is an regional park in Fountain Valley, California, United States. It includes two lakes, two 18-hole golf courses, an archery range, baseball and softball fields, picnic shelters, a 20-acre (81,000 m^{2}) urban nature area planted with California native plants, a 55-acre (220,000 m^{2}) recreation center with tennis courts, basketball courts, racquetball courts, a gymnasium, the Kingston Boys & Girls Club, and a community center.

This regional park was built on a naval landing field soon after the city was incorporated. James Kanno, one of America's first Japanese American mayors, led the effort to create the park.

The park derives its name from the near-perfect square of land that it occupies, bounded by Edinger and Warner Avenues on the north and south sides, and Brookhurst and Euclid Streets on the west and east sides, respectively. Each side measures 1 mi (1.6 km), for a total area of 1 sq mi (640 acres; 2.6 km^{2}).

== History ==
In 1942, the Navy purchased 640 acres (2.6 km^{2}) of agricultural land for Mile Square Naval Outer Landing Field, which used as an auxiliary for Naval Air Station, Los Alamitos. Three landing fields were constructed in a triangular shape in the center of this area, with each field being approximately 2,200 feet (670 m) in length. It was used for carrier deck qualification practice by Navy aircraft. In March 1967, Orange County entered into a long-term lease with the Navy Department for the perimeter area of the site which allowed the county to develop this area for regional park purposes. Military operations in the center airfield ceased in 1974. The east section of the park has a fee to park vehicles, and is operated by OC Parks. The west section of the park is operated by the city of Fountain Valley and has free parking.

The park was built in several phases:

- Phase I was opened with 85 acres (340,000 m^{2}) of land in 1970
- Phase II added the baseball diamond and a children's play area in 1973
- Phase III extended the park northward to Edinger Avenue in 1976
- Phase IV development commenced in the spring of 1987 and included the construction of an executive golf course.
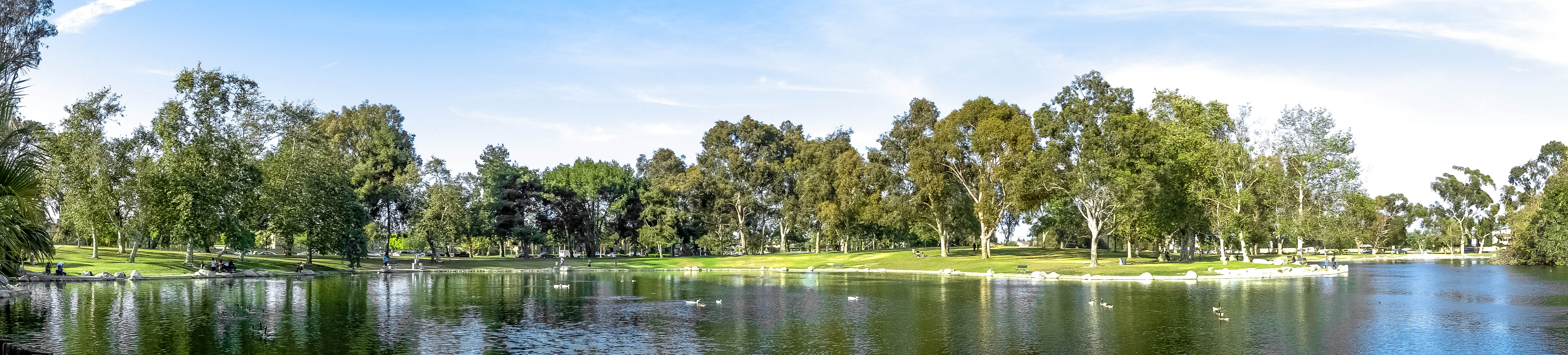
Mile Square Regional Park

== Facilities ==
Sixty-two acres (25 ha) of the park have been improved over time by the City with many sports facilities. The park was selected as the site for a Vietnam War memorial to honor Vietnamese troops who worked alongside U.S. forces in Vietnam in 2023, however the project was later cancelled in 2026 following revelations that $1 million intended for the project was stolen by former Orange County Supervisor Andrew Do.
