= Whiting Ranch Wilderness Park =

Park in Orange County, California

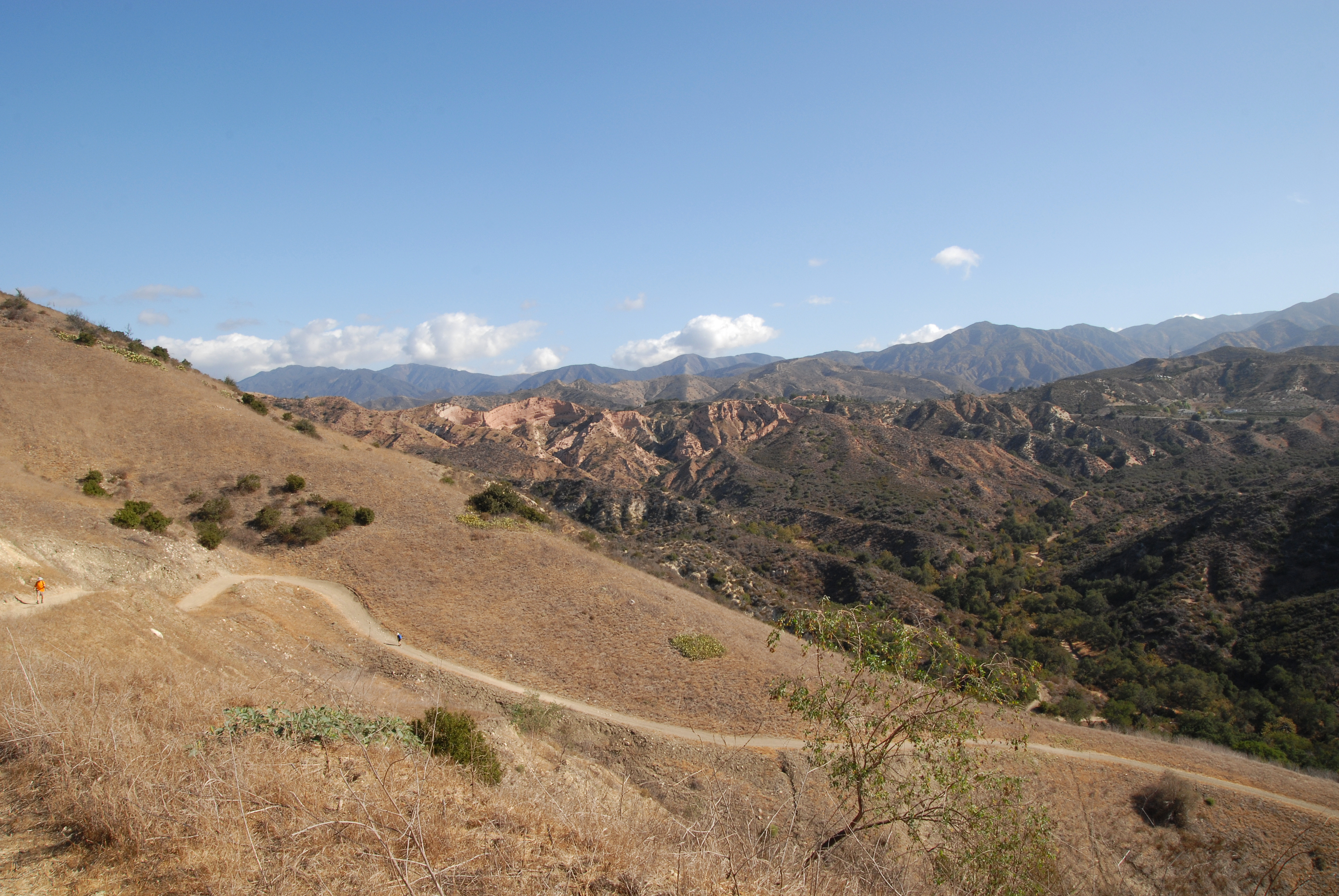
- Whiting Ranch in 2014

- Location within southern California
- Location: Orange County, California, United States
- Nearest city: Lake Forest
- Coordinates: 33°40′29″N 117°38′32″W
- Area: 2,500 acres (10 km^{2})
- Max. elevation: Vista Lookout; 33°32′01″N 117°39′21″W; 1,500 ft (460 m)
- Named for: Dwight Whiting
- Operator: OC Parks
- Website: OC Parks

Whiting Ranch Wilderness Park is a 2,500 acre public regional park within the city of Lake Forest in southern Orange County, California. Whiting Ranch features riparian, oak woodland, grassland, chaparral, and coastal sage scrub environments throughout various canyons and hillscapes. The park is home to over 17 miles of trail spread out over 23 different paths, making the location a popular destination for mountain bikers, hikers, and horseback riders.

The park is close to Cleveland National Forest. Mountain lions frequent the park, searching for deer and small animals. While attacks on people are rare, they do occur and visitors are warned to be alert and not approach the animals.

== History ==
Whiting Ranch was the first part of a 10,000-acre ranch named Rancho Cañada de los Alisos that was granted to Jose Serrano in 1842. Following a period of cattle and crop farming, Serrano had to foreclose the property in 1864 due to a drought. Dwight Whiting bought most of the land in 1885 after it was divided up by land developer J. S. Slauson. Whiting developed a large portion of the property into the city of El Toro, now known as Lake Forest. Whiting Ranch was left mostly untouched until a 1959 sale of the area to V.P. Baker and Associates, who have since built homes near the site.

== Amenities ==
=== Trails ===
Whiting Ranch is home to 23 trails:

- Billy Goat Trail
- Borrego Canyon Trail (cyclists one-way, staging area on Portola Parkway in Foothill Ranch)
- Cactus Hill Trail
- Cattle Pond Loop Trail
- Concourse Road
- Coyote Brush Road (staging area on Glenn Ranch Road in Foothill Ranch)
- Dreaded Hill Road
- Edison Road
- Line Shack Road
- Live Oak Trail
- Mustard Road
- Raptor Road
- Red Rock Canyon Trail
- Sage Scrub Trail
- Santiago Ranch Road
- Serrano Cow Trail
- Serrano Road
- Sleepy Hollow Trail
- Vista Lookout Road
- Vulture View Road
- Water Tank Road
- Whiting Road
- Whiting Spur Road

=== Borrego Canyon ===
Borrego Canyon is a portion of the park that features an entrance point at Portola Parkway and the Borrego Canyon Trail. The lower portion of Borrego Canyon is tightly situated between two Foothill Ranch housing tracts and is covered with a swath of oak trees. Snakes, deer, and birds can be found living in this area.

=== Red Rock Canyon ===
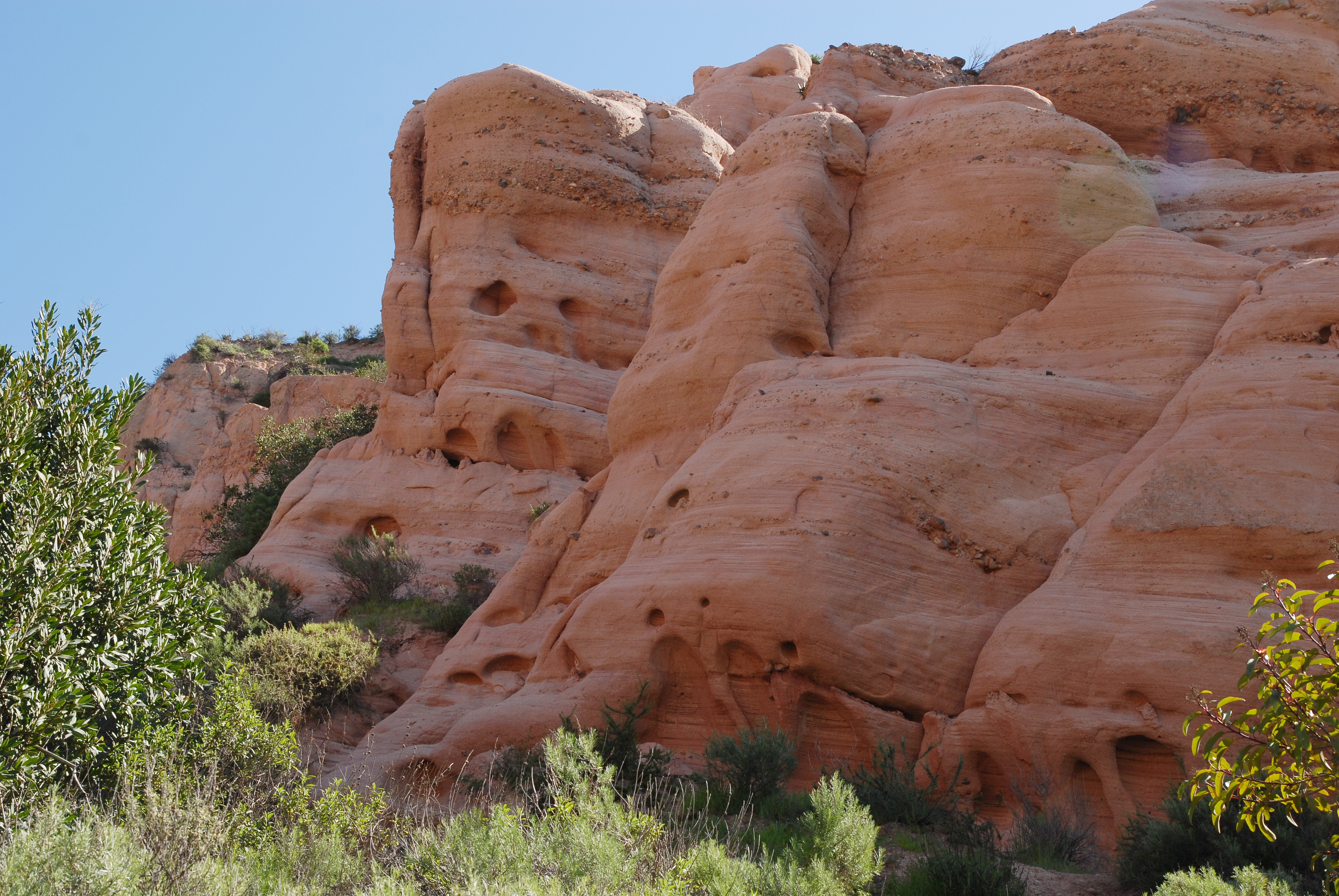
Red Rock Canyon in 2017

Red Rock Canyon is an area at the north end of the park that has become a popular location for visitors. The red sandstone cliffs are unique to the area and thus have become one of the most notable features of the park. Due to the gradual erosion of the canyon, fossils have been discovered there. In 2020, the canyon was inaccessible due to damages from the Silverado Fire.

=== Serrano Creek ===
The 7.5 mile long Serrano Creek travels through Whiting Ranch.

=== Vista Lookout ===
Vista Lookout stands as the highest point in the vicinity of the park. At 1,500 feet, visitors seek out the spot for panoramic views of the landscape as well as the suburban cityscape of Orange County. In 2020, the point was inaccessible due to the Silverado Fire.

== Wildfires ==
Due to the dry climate in much of the park, Whiting Ranch has been subject to numerous wildfires. The 2007 Santiago Fire devastated the area, burning 90% of the property and leaving a lasting effect over a decade later.

The Silverado Fire, which took place in October 2020, burned a similar path to the Santiago Fire and burned through much of the park. The Bond Fire, another wildfire that took place in the same vicinity in December 2020, did not cause much further damage to the park. According to the Orange County Fire Authority, the forward progress of the Bond Fire was largely hampered by the Silverado Fire burn scar, much of which covers Whiting Ranch.

== Wildlife ==
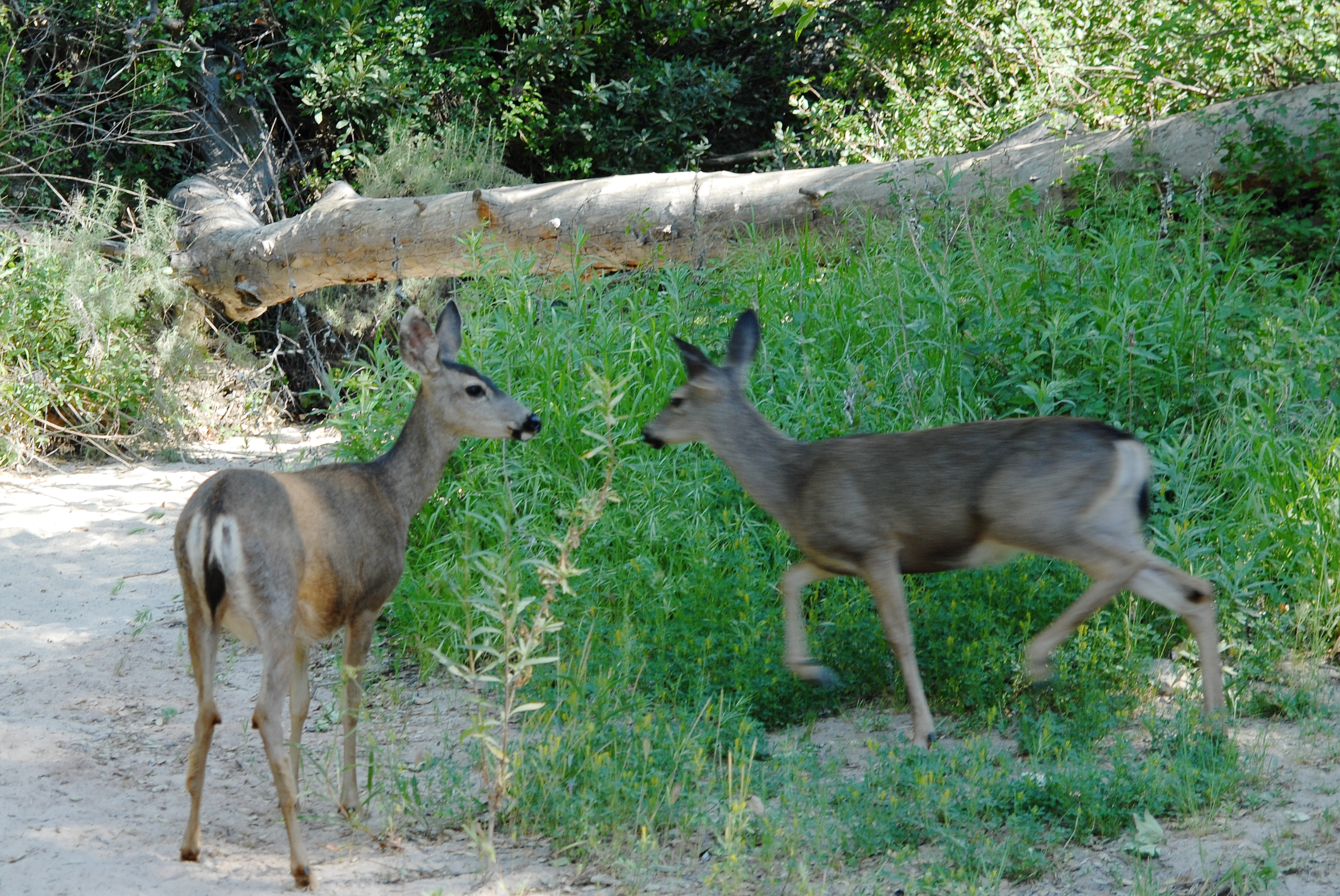
Two mule deer are seen at the park in 2013

The park is home to various species of wildlife that are found throughout Southern California. Mule deer, the only species of deer found in Orange County, are common in the park. They are preyed upon by an estimated 30 mountain lions that move throughout the Santa Ana mountain range and its foothills. Mountain lion sightings are uncommon but have prompted park closures on multiple occasions. Coyotes, bobcats, raccoons, grey foxes, and both striped and spotted skunks are frequent throughout the park. The elusive american badger has not been sighted within the park, but is known to inhabit the greater surrounding wilderness.

The park is home to various reptiles, including the common western fence lizard and the southern alligator lizard. Pacific gopher snakes, Red diamond rattlesnakes, Southern Pacific rattlesnakes, and other species of snakes inhabit the area.

Red-tailed hawks and red-shouldered hawks can be seen flying throughout the park's boundaries. Both great horned owls and barn owls are known to be present in the area. Whiting Ranch is also home to several small bird species, including the cactus wren and the endangered California gnatcatcher.

=== Mountain lion attacks ===
On January 9, 2004, a 35-year-old cyclist named Mark Reynolds was attacked and killed by a mountain lion at Whiting Ranch. That same day, it attacked another biker in its defense of Reynolds's body. Authorities located and killed the mountain lion responsible and stated that they would also kill any other mountain lions they spotted for an indefinite period. Investigators later announced that they believed Reynolds was attacked and killed while crouching down to fix his bike after its chain broke. The attack was only the 22nd in California since 1890 and only the sixth time a person had been killed by a mountain lion in the state's recorded history. As a result of this incident, the Mark J. Reynolds Memorial Bike Fund was created to offer bikes to underprivileged children.

== See also ==
- Santiago Canyon, California
