= Ralph B. Clark Regional Park =

Regional park in Orange County, California

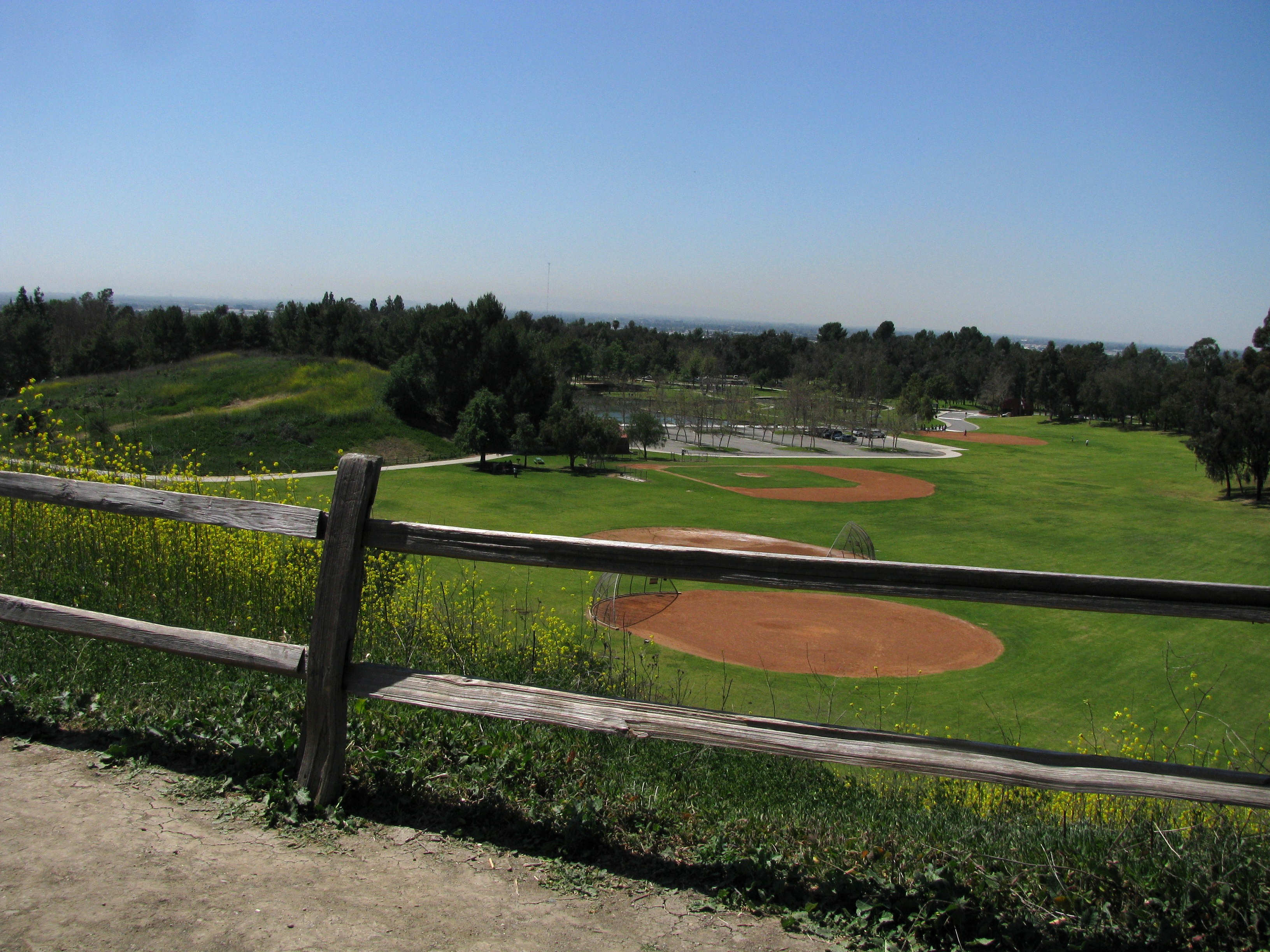
- View of the park from Camel Hill
- Interactive map of Ralph B. Clark Regional Park
- Type: Regional (Orange County, California)
- Location: 8800 Rosecrans Avenue; Buena Park, California (714) 973-3170; 2851 Rosecrans Avenue; Fullerton, California (714) 973-3170
- Coordinates: 33°53′35″N 117°58′45″W
- Area: 105 acres (42 ha)
- Created: 1981
- Status: Open

Ralph B. Clark Regional Park is an urban park located in the cities of Fullerton and Buena Park, California. The park is maintained by Orange County Regional Parks, the government division that controls the regional parks in Orange County. The park is south of Rosecrans Avenue at the southern edge of the West Coyote Hills in Buena Park, but both a small section named Camel Hill next to the main park area south of Rosecrans and another small section of the park with three softball fields and a trail located north of Rosecrans Avenue are within Fullerton city limits, known as "The Yard". The park was originally opened as Los Coyotes Regional Park in 1981, and was renamed in 1987 after then-retiring Orange County Supervisor Ralph B. Clark (1917–2009).

== Park facilities and activities ==
Amphitheater, barbecues, baseball/softball fields, bicycling, fire rings, fishing, group picnic areas, hiking trails, horseshoe pits, Interpretive Center, interpretive programs, model sail boating, picnic tables, picnic shelters, playground equipment, tennis courts, volleyball courts.

"The Yard", north of Rosecrans Avenue, has three softball fields and a trail. This portion is often closed, and is within Fullerton city limits. There are three more softball fields in the main park. Parking in this section is free, while parking in the main section of the park has a charge per vehicle with no free re-entry.

== Interpretive center ==
The interpretive center is a small museum which features ice age fossil and local geology exhibits. The small, curated museum is usually open Wednesday through Saturday 10am-2pm, subject to staff and volunteer availability.

The center has a mural of ice age mammals by Mark Hallet.

Among the fossils on display is a 9-million-year-old baleen whale skeleton that was recovered from a local construction site. It is reputed to be one of the only complete Miocene whale fossils in existence.

== Trails ==
The park has a pleasant tree shaded trail that runs about 1.2 miles (1.9 km) along its periphery (including a 0.3-mile (500 m) walk along the north edge of the park).

The trail rises to the top of Camel Hill (located in the north east corner of the park). Sights from the top of Camel Hill include Catalina Island, the Long Beach port, Signal Hill, Palos Verdes Peninsula, the KFI radio tower, Hawks Point Bluff, Mount Baldy, the Los Coyotes Country Club, the Santa Ana Mountains and the Huntington Beach Power Plant structures.

== Nearby Trails ==
The trail head for the Emery Ranch Trail lies just to the west of the portion of the park which is north of Rosecrans Avenue. This is a somewhat steep 0.4-mile-long (600 m) trail that winds its way up through the local coastal sage scrub plant community. The trail ends at the peak of the hill near a water storage tank.

The trail head for the Castlewood Trail and the Rosecrans Trail are on the northern side of Rosecrans about 0.4 miles (600 m) east of the park entrance. These trails are part of the Fullerton loop, a popular mountain biking route.

== Wildlife ==
The park has a surprising variety of wildlife, given its small size. More than 130 species of birds have been sighted in the park and there are resident populations of squirrels, rabbits, fish, lizards and turtles. In the evening, just after sundown, bats can be seen feeding on the insects that fly over the pond. On occasion coyotes, raccoons and opossums visit the park.

== Fishing ==
The pond is stocked with catfish and trout. In addition, there is a resident population of Largemouth bass and bluegill. Catch and release rules apply to the bass.

Fishing licenses are required for people sixteen years and older.

== Gallery ==
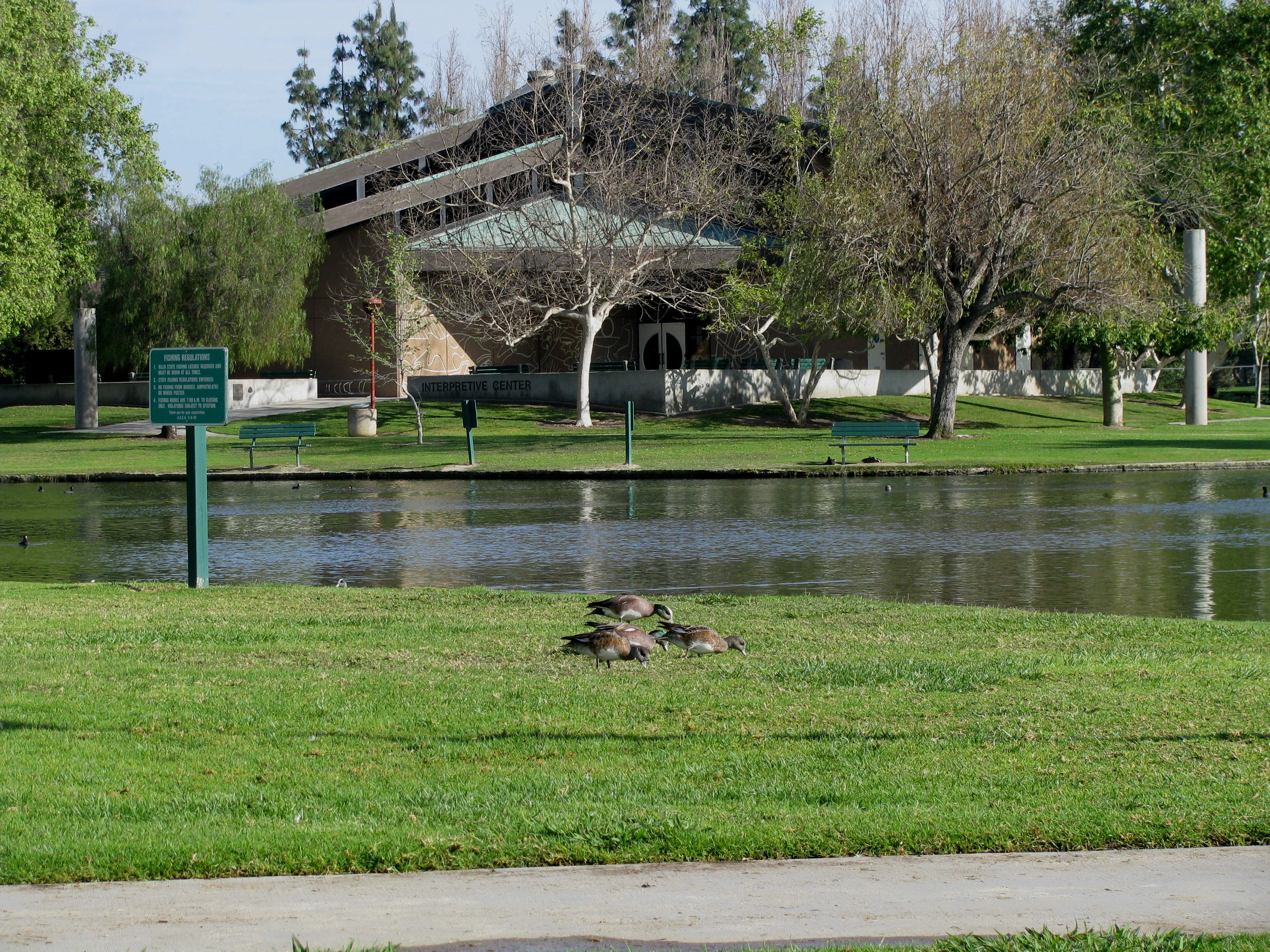
Interpretive Center seen across the pond

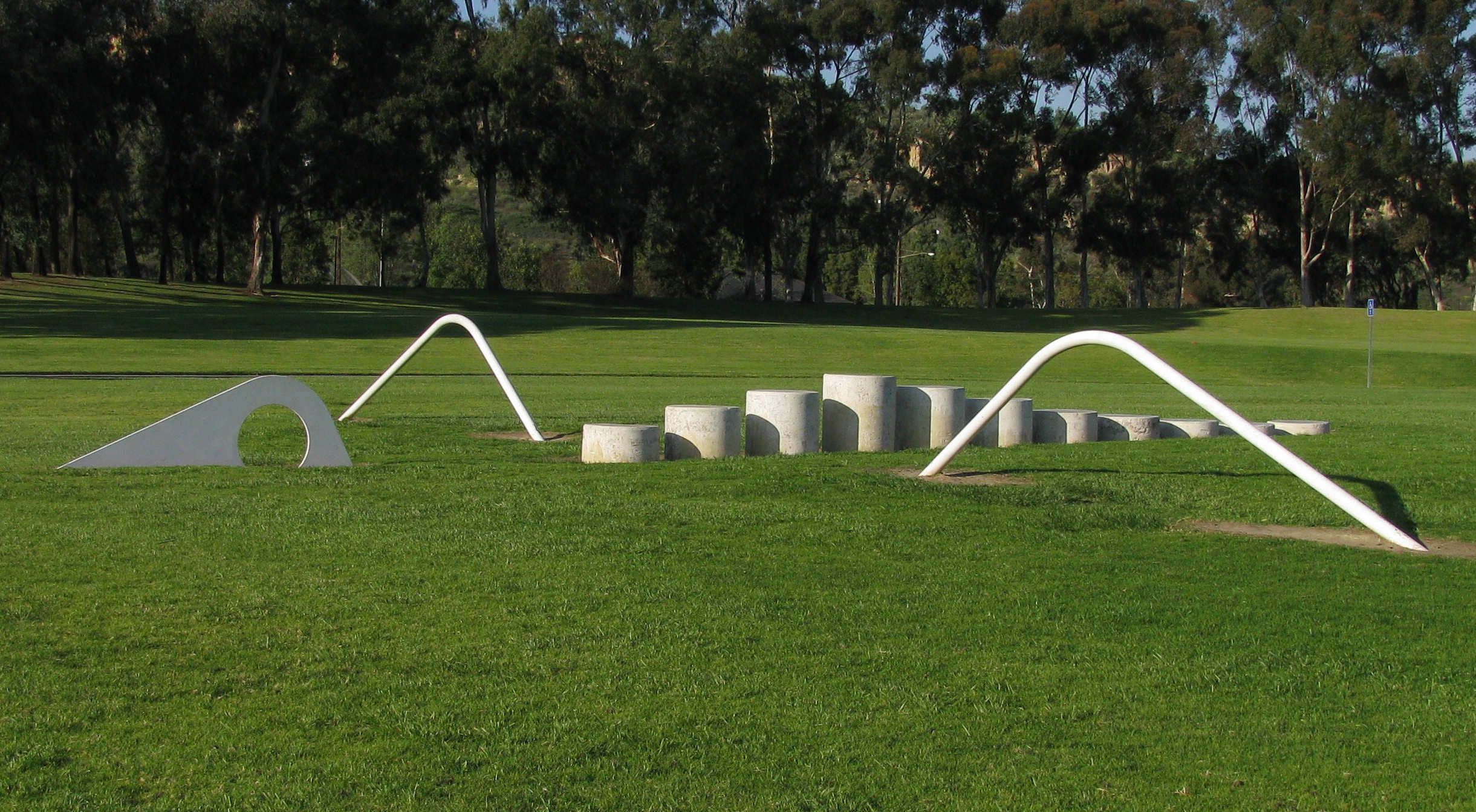
Pterodactyl sculpture

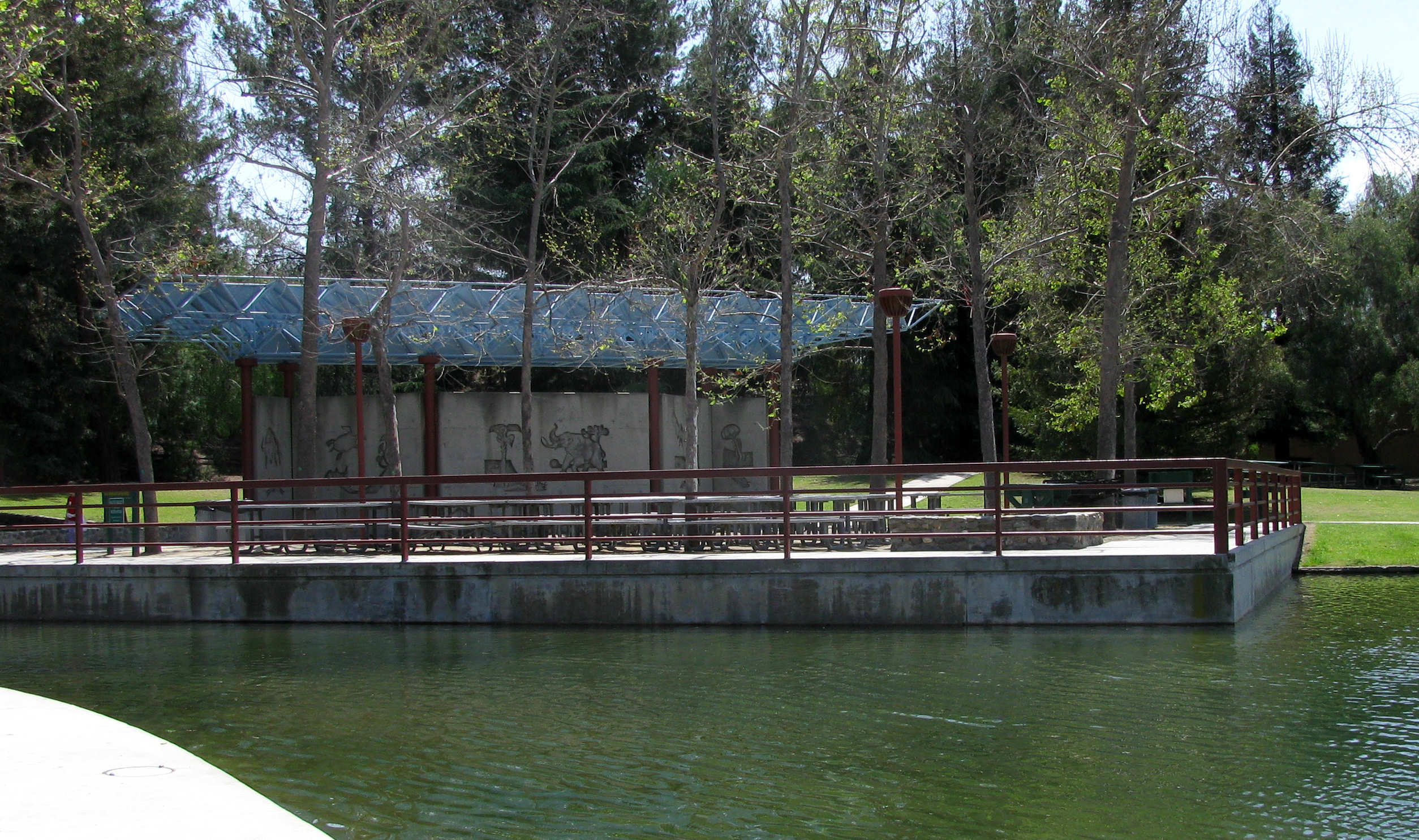
Group picnic shelter

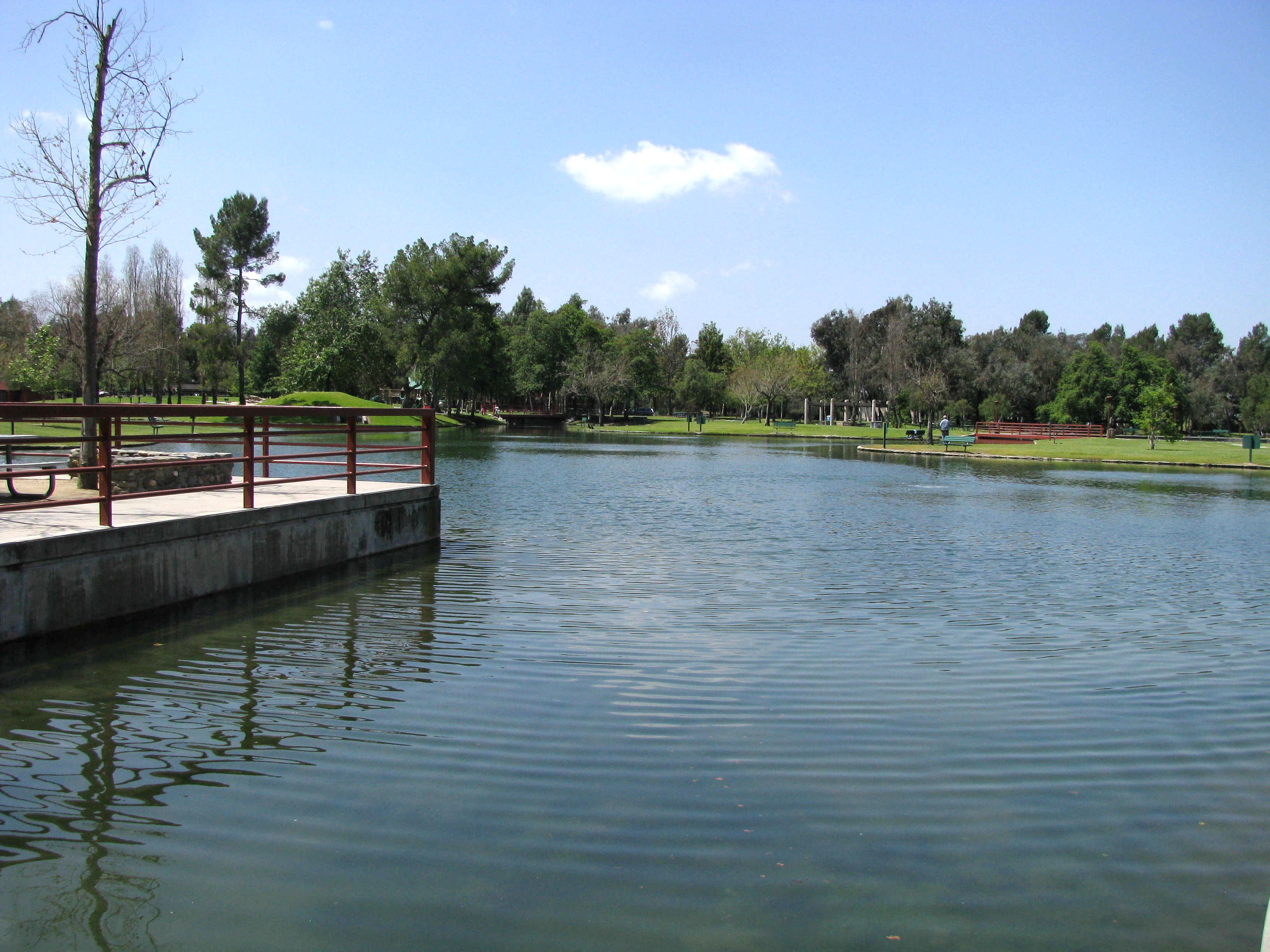
Looking west across the pond

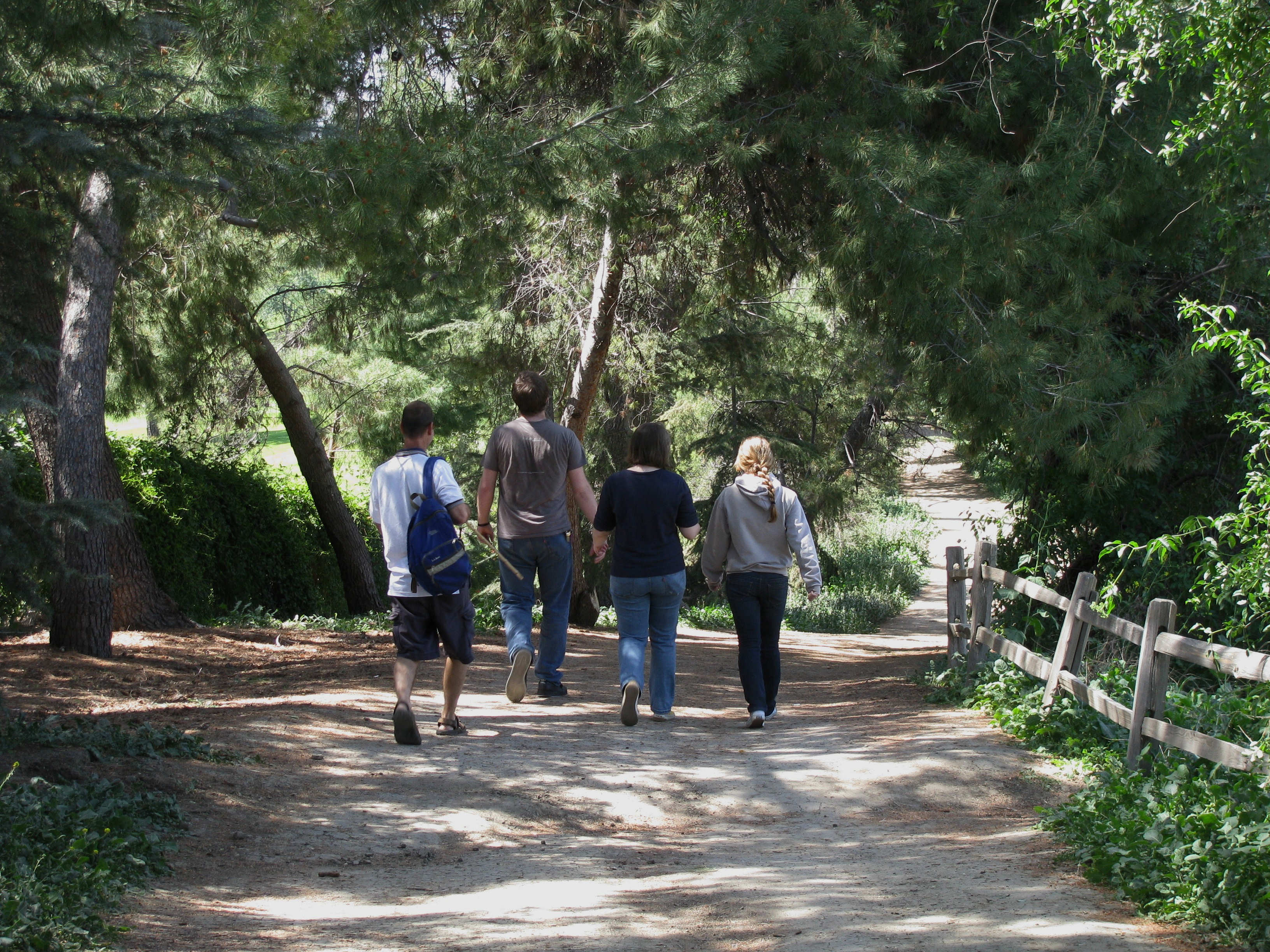
Northeast section of the perimeter trail
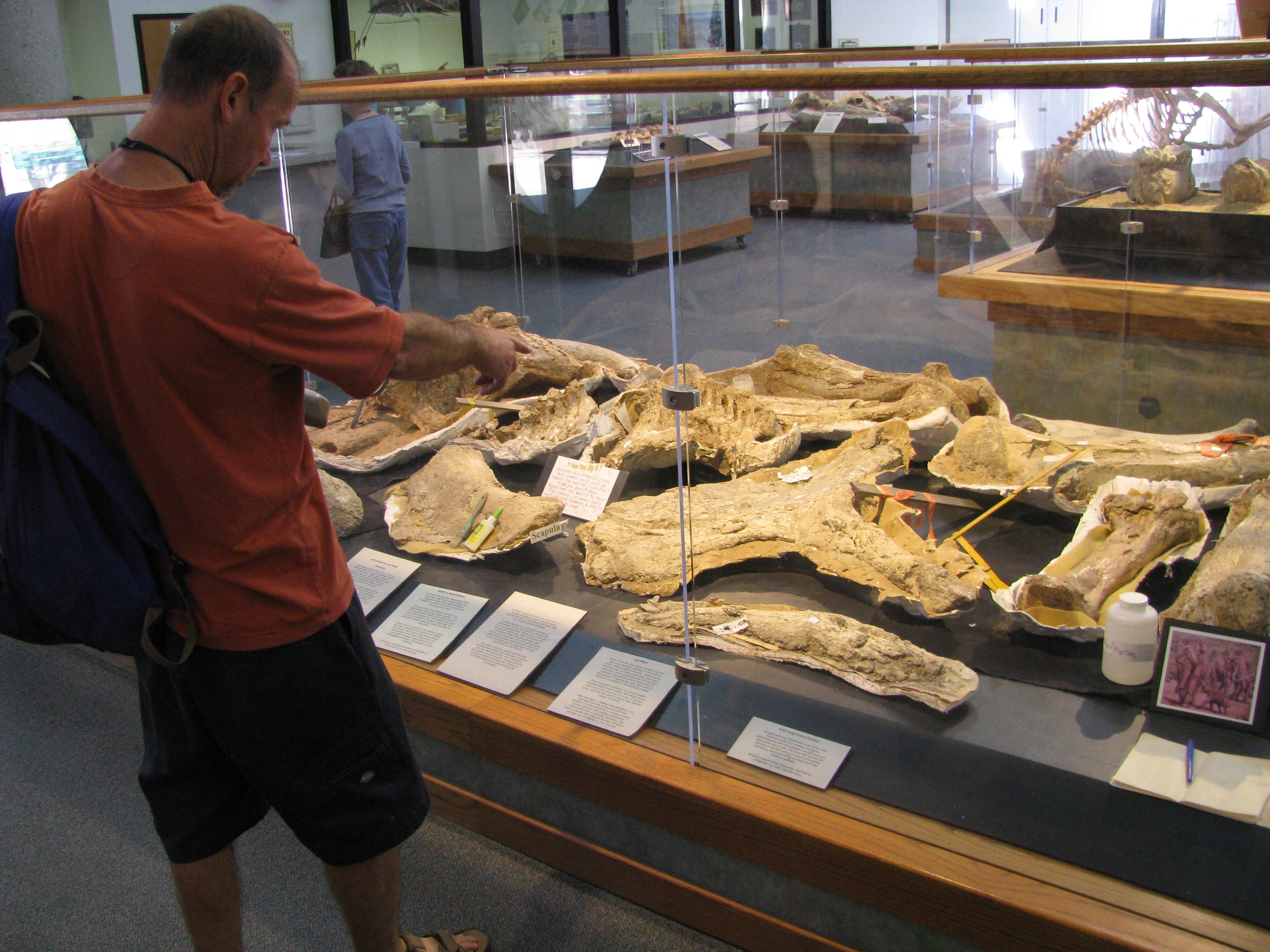
Interpretive Center fossil collecting exhibit

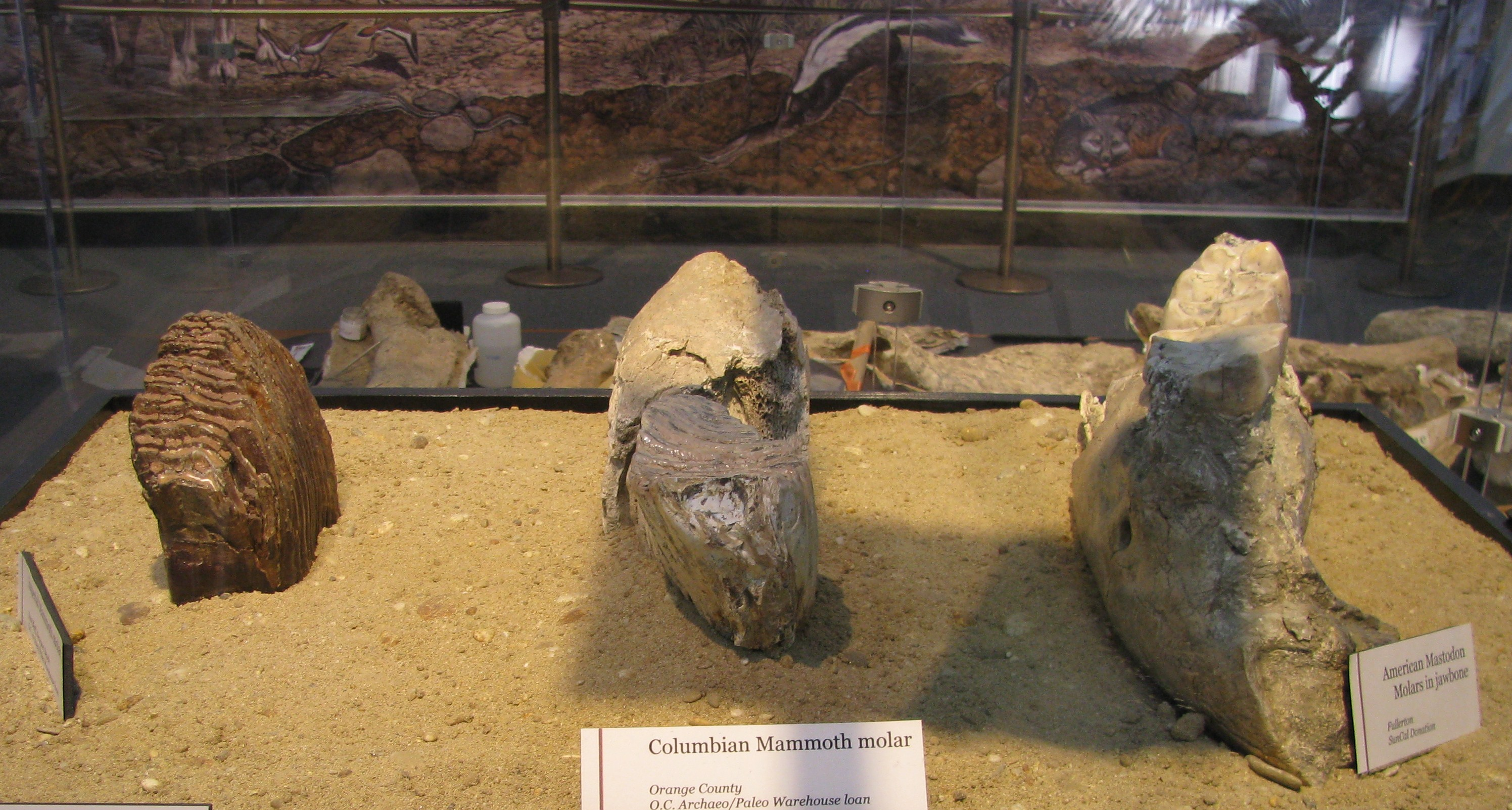
Mammoth and Mastodon teeth

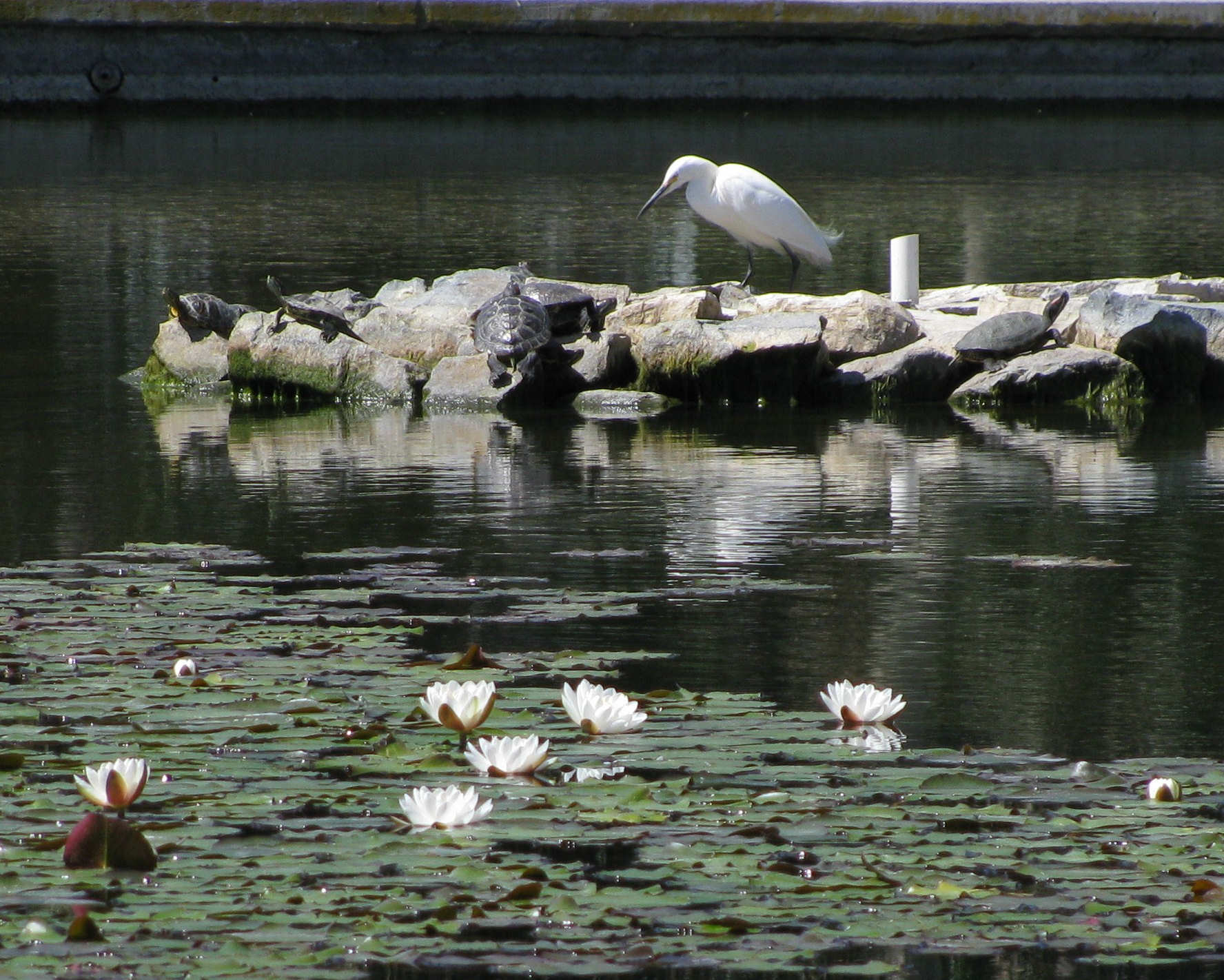
Turtles and snowy egret in the pond

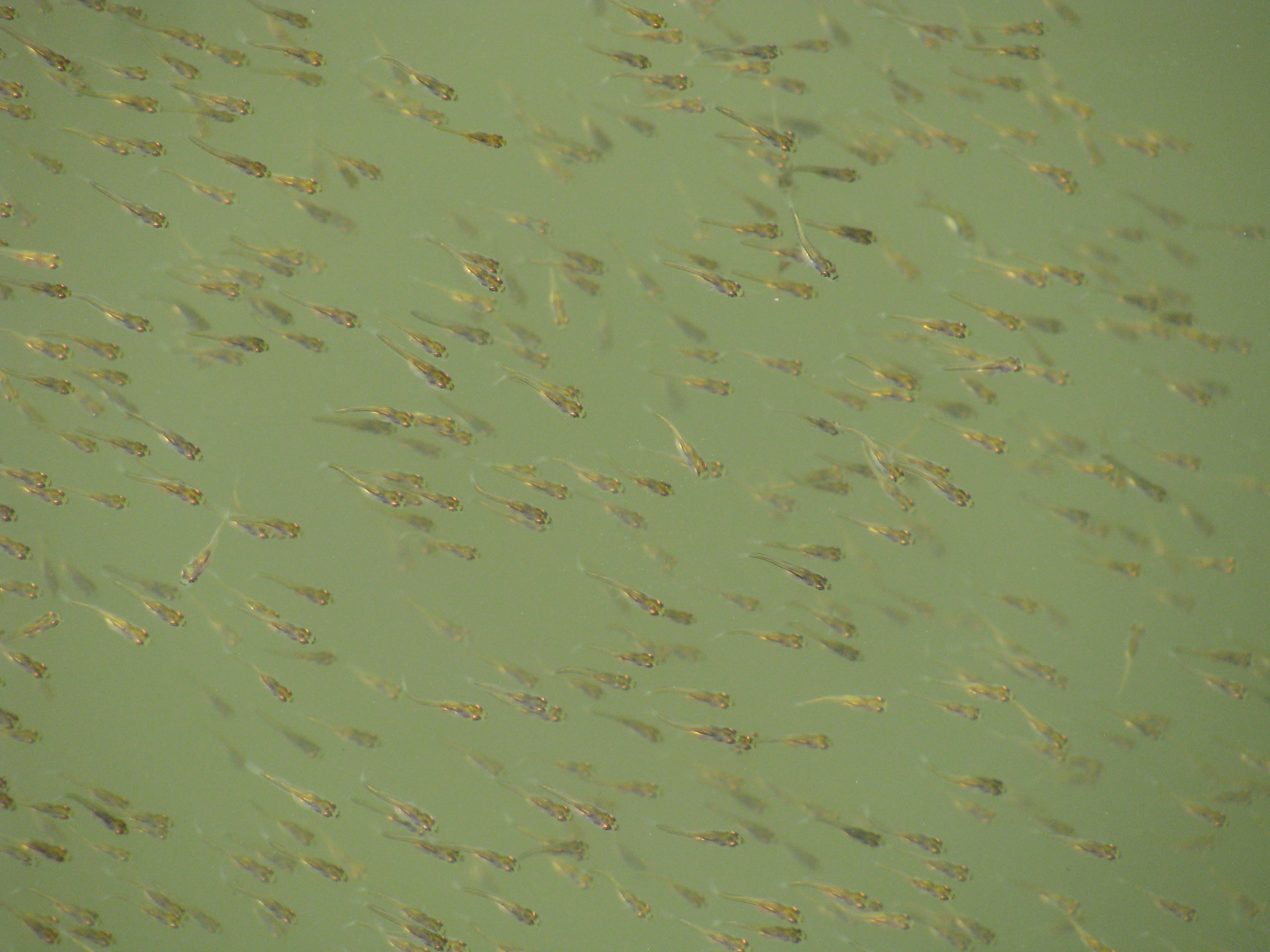
Bass fry born in the pond

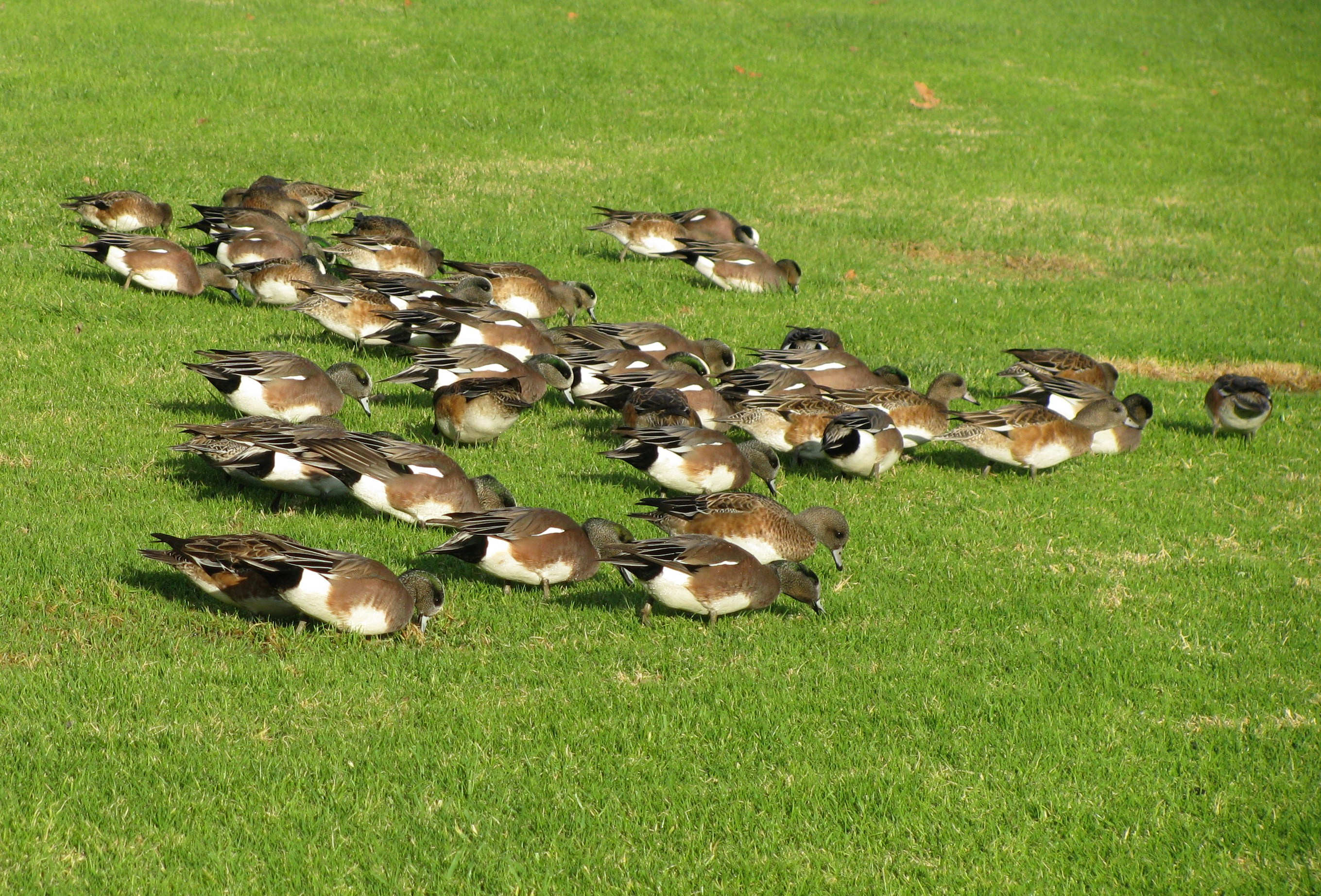
American wigeon grazing alongside the pond
