= Bommer Canyon =

Open space preserve in Irvine, California, U.S.

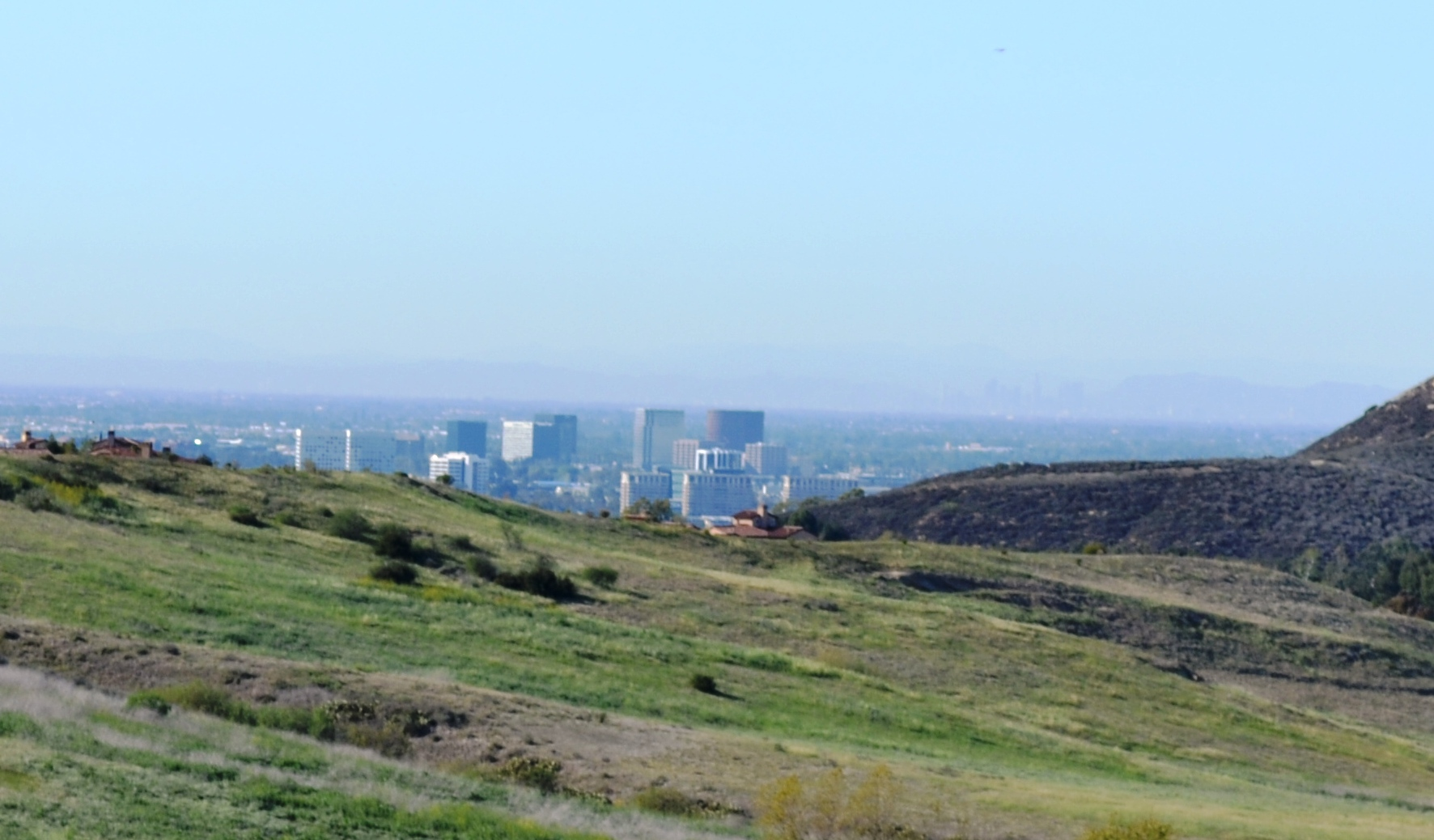
- View from the Bommer Pass Trail within Bommer Canyon toward Costa Mesa, California. On clear days, canyon paths offer views to downtown Los Angeles nearly 40 miles (64 km) away.

- Location within California Location within the United States
- Location: Irvine, California
- Coordinates: 33.629646°N 117.807566°W
- Area: 4,000 acres (1,600 ha)
- Established: 1981–1982
- Governing body: City of Irvine and Irvine Ranch Conservancy
- Website: web.archive.org/web/20120511001143/http://www.ci.irvine.ca.us/cityhall/cs/openspace/bommer_canyon.asp

Bommer Canyon is an open space preserve in southern Irvine, California featuring hiking and biking trails as well as private event areas. The canyon is part of the Irvine Ranch, which itself is a National Natural Landmark, the first California Natural Landmark, and part of the City of Irvine Open Space Preserve. The preserve is adjacent to the affluent Irvine villages of Shady Canyon and Turtle Ridge and features roughly 4,000 acres of preserved open space. Approximately 15 of these acres are preserved as a "Cattle Camp" named for the area's previous cattle operations and are now rented for private events such as campouts, company picnics, and family reunions. The trails in Bommer Canyon feature groves of oak and sycamore trees as well as rough rock outcrops and are popular with area residents who use them for nature walks, hiking and mountain biking.

== History ==
=== 19th century ===
In 1837, José Antonio Andrés Sepúlveda established Rancho San Joaquin, including the entire area now known as Bommer Canyon. In 1864, Flint, Bixby & Co. purchased a large portion of Rancho San Joaquin including Bommer Canyon and its surroundings. Then, in 1867, James Irvine, who had been a silent partner in Flint-Bixby, became the sole owner of Irvine Ranch.

=== Cattle operations ===
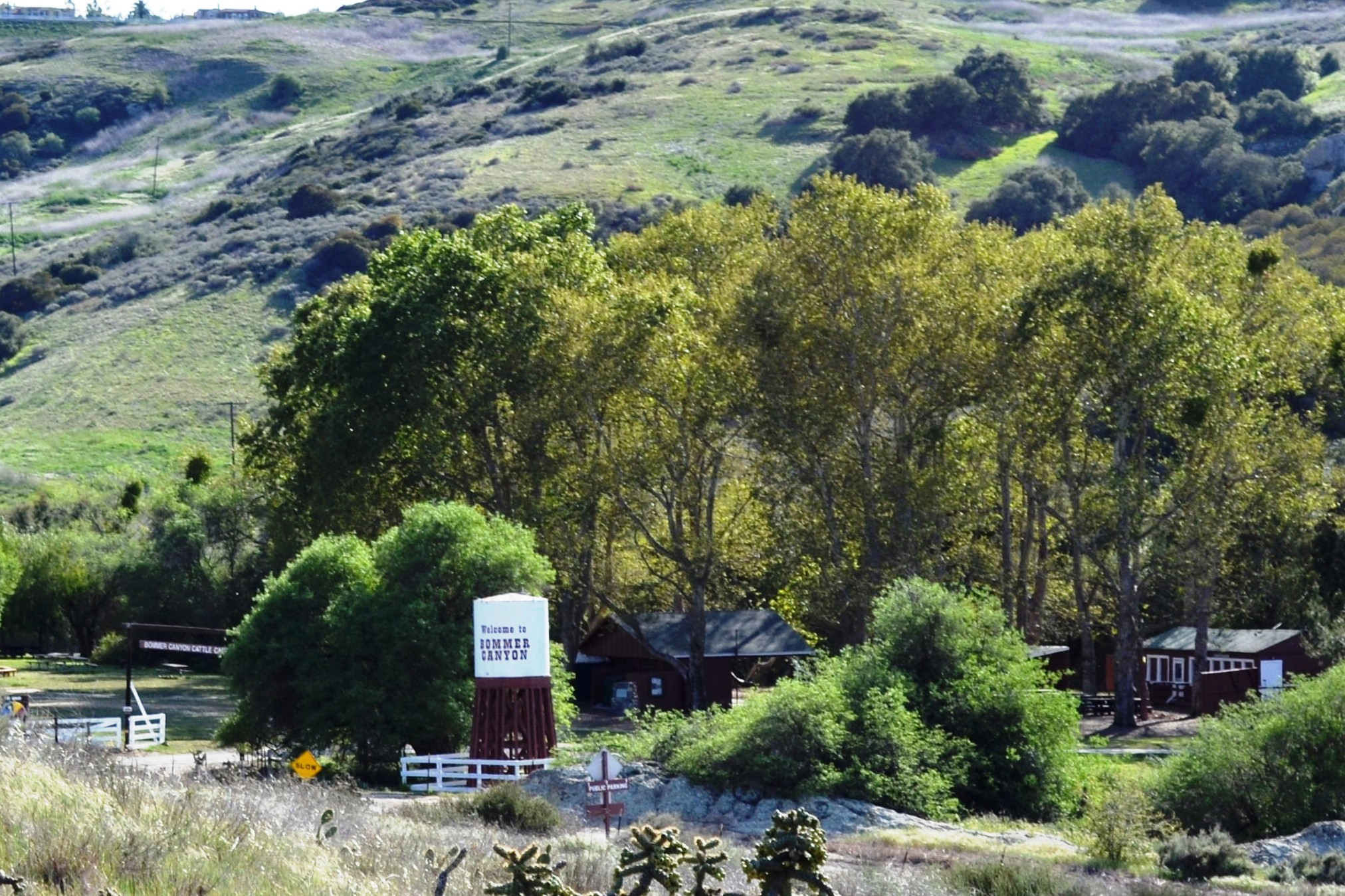
View of the Bommer Canyon Cattle Camp area within the preserve with water tower reading "Welcome to Bommer Canyon." The canyon was utilized as part of the Irvine Company's cattle operations for approximately one hundred years.

Between the late 1800s to the 1970s, the "Bommer Canyon Cattle Camp" served as the center of the Irvine Company's cattle operations. James Irvine remarked in 1867 that he and his men "rode about [the Irvine Ranch] a good deal, sometimes coming home in the evening after a thirty- or forty-mile ride pretty thoroughly tired out, but we had to do it in order to see much of the ranch and the flock." At the time, his Irvine Company had been purchasing further adjoining parcels of land, "[s]o there [was] considerable riding to be done, if one [was] to see much of [the ranch]." By the late 1970s, the Irvine Company had ceased its cattle business altogether.

=== Designation as natural landmark ===
With the Irvine Company's cattle operations finished, the Irvine Company sold the Bommer Canyon area to the City of Irvine between 1981 and 1982. The City of Irvine purchased the land with grants obtained from the 1974 California Bond Act. In 1996, roughly 50,000 acres (20,000 ha) of preserved land on Irvine Ranch, including Bommer Canyon, were designated as a National Natural Landmark—the first such landmark for California since 1987. Collectively the preserved lands are known as the Irvine Ranch Natural Landmarks.

On April 22, 2008, Governor Arnold Schwarzenegger hiked with Irvine Company chairman Donald Bren as well as local Eagle Scouts and Girl Scouts in Bommer Canyon before officially declaring nearly 40,000 acres of the old Irvine Ranch, including the canyon, as the first California Natural Landmark. As a California Natural Landmark, the state of California has recognized Bommer Canyon as "one of the best examples of California's natural heritage." Following the hike in the canyon, Gov. Schwarzenegger was quoted as saying, "Only in California can you see a 40,000-acre (16,000 ha) natural landmark right in the middle of one of the nation's most vibrant and economically important urban areas." While the designation does not secure permanent protection or public access to the area, officials at the time stated they hoped that designating Irvine Ranch as a California natural landmark would encourage long-term preservation through attention to the area's unique features.

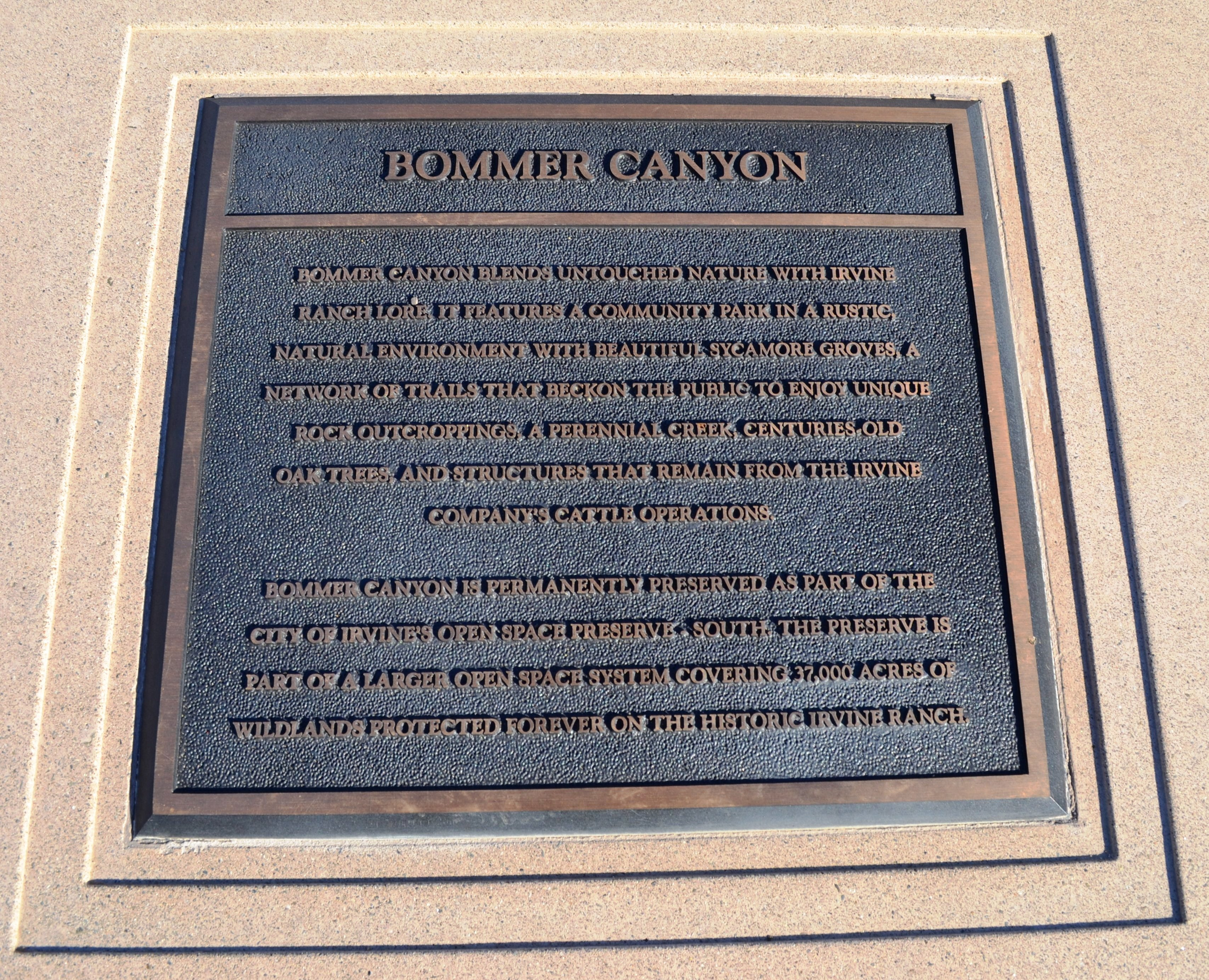
A plaque at the entrance to the Bommer Canyon trailhead touts the preserve's oak trees, rock outcroppings, and designation as part of the City of Irvine's Open Space Preserve.

On April 15, 2011, the city of Irvine officially opened the Bommer Canyon trailhead at the corner of Bommer Canyon and Shady Canyon roads. The trailhead opening included an official ribbon-cutting ceremony with the mayor of Irvine, Sukhee Kang, and city council members, followed by an Earth Day hike through the preserve.

== Access ==
Many trails in Bommer Canyon are open daily for self-guided hikes or bike-riding from approximately dawn to dusk. However, some trails and areas within the canyon can only be accessed through guided programs and require pre-registration with the city or Irvine Ranch Conservancy. The city of Irvine plans "Monthly Wilderness Access Days" to allow hikers and bikers access to these other networks of trails.

The City of Irvine currently permits area residents to rent the former cattle operations part of the canyon for campouts and other special events.

=== Features and resources ===
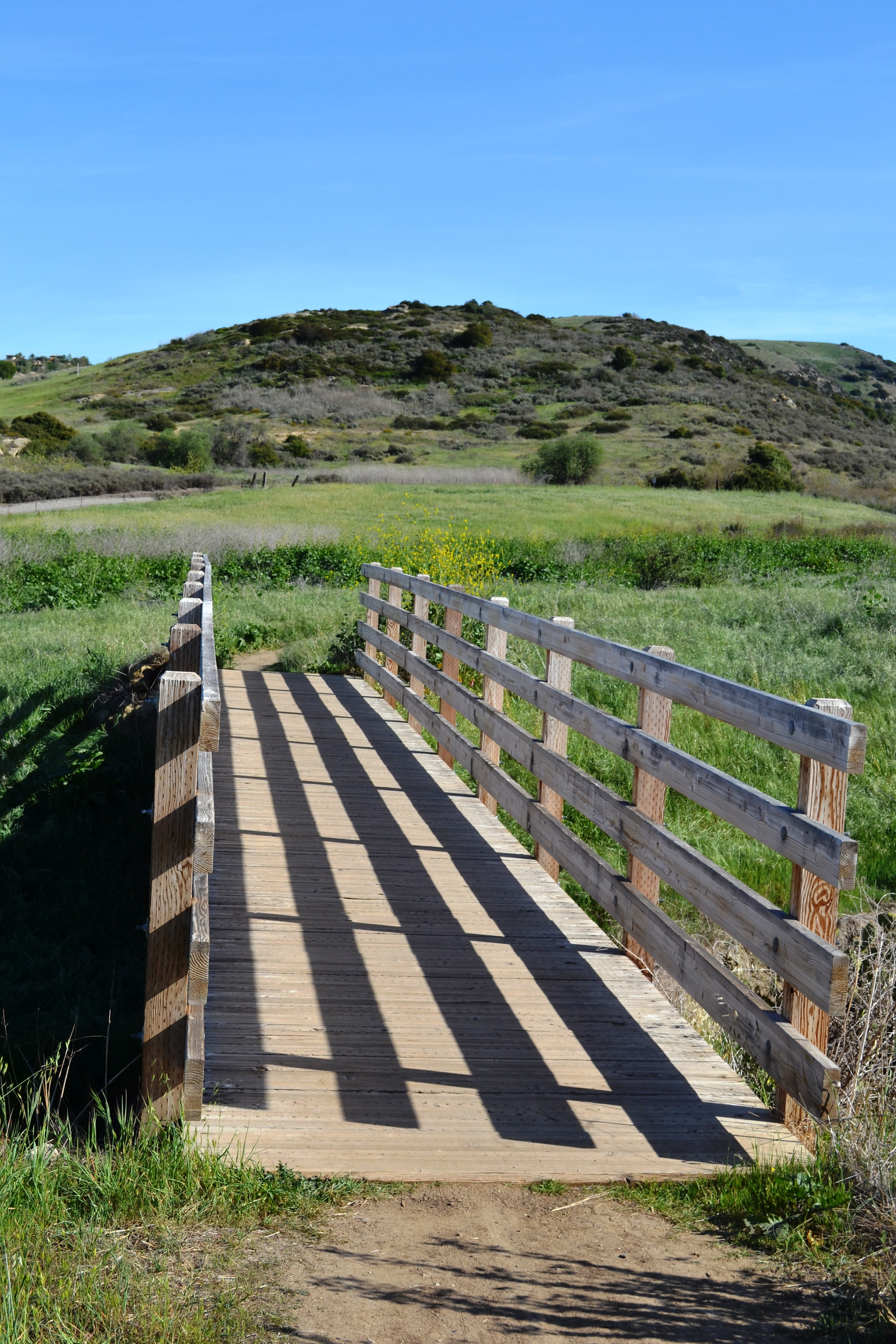
View of a wooden bridge along Bommer Meadow Trail. Several simple bridges in the park allow trail users to traverse low-lying areas of the preserve without disrupting natural creek beds.

The City of Irvine considers Bommer Canyon an important preservation area for many local plants and wildlife and has stated that the area is home to a number of endangered species. The "Cattle Camp" portion of the canyon, intended for special events, includes a covered stage area, a barbecue pit, a large chuck wagon for food preparation and service, sand volleyball court, horseshoe pits, as well as an area for campfires.
