= Frank R. Bowerman Landfill =

Landfill in California

Coordinates: 33°42′58.10″N 117°42′10.72″W

The Frank R. Bowerman Landfill is a landfill in the western Santa Ana Mountains, in Orange County, California. It opened in 1990 and is located between Limestone Canyon Regional Park and State Route 241.

It is one of the largest landfills in California and the ninth largest in the United States. It contains an estimated 31 million tons of waste.

== History ==
The landfill is named after Professor Frank R. Bowerman, former director of environmental engineering programs at the University of Southern California and former president of the American Academy of Environmental Engineers and the American Academy for Environmental Protection. Bowerman was also a technical consultant to the environmentally themed science fiction film Soylent Green.

== Landfill gas utilization ==
It is the site for the world's first commercial landfill gas to liquid natural gas project, the Bowerman Landfill Project, constructed by Prometheus Energy, an LNG fuel company based in Redmond, Washington, and Montauk Energy, a capital investment firm.
