= Irvine Ranch Natural Landmarks =

Collection of protected areas in Orange County, California

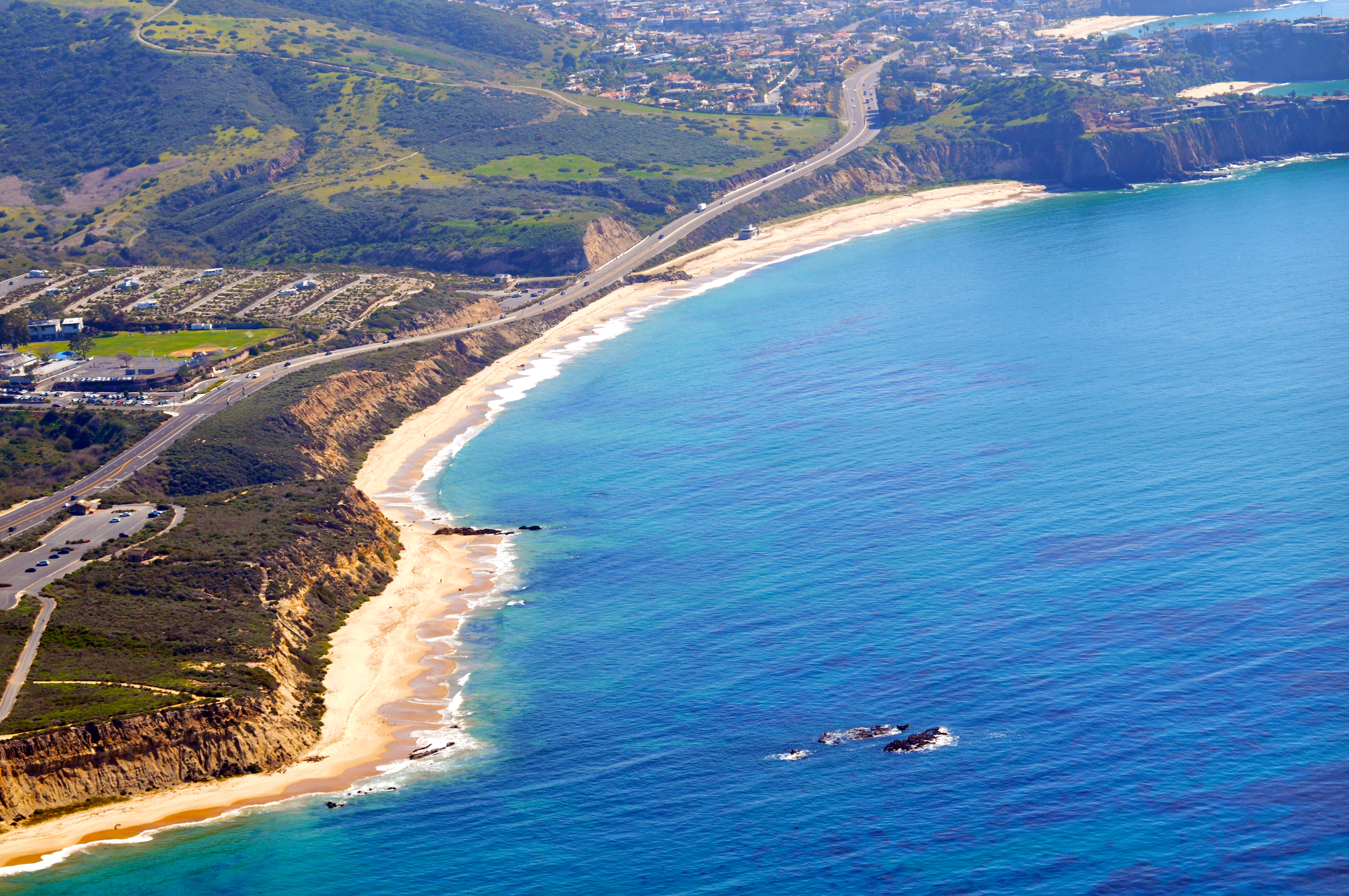
- The beach in Crystal Cove State Park

- Location within California Location within the United States
- Location: Orange County, California
- Nearest city: Irvine
- Coordinates: 33.7315°N 117.693°W
- Area: 50,000 acres (20,000 ha)
- Website: www.irlandmarks.org

The Irvine Ranch Natural Landmarks (also known collectively as Irvine Ranch Open Space) are a collection of protected areas in Orange County, California in and around Irvine. They encompass almost 50,000 acres (20,000 ha) of land which was once a part of the Irvine Ranch owned by the Irvine Company. Almost 40,000 acres (16,000 ha) of the landmarks were designated a National Natural Landmark in 2006 and a California Natural Landmark in 2008.

Irvine Ranch contains a remarkably complete stratigraphic succession ranging in age from late Cretaceous (80 million years ago) to the present. The primary biological features at the site include coastal sage scrub and chaparral communities, including rare Tecate cypress woodlands.

== History ==
The Irvine Ranch started out as a cattle ranch in the 1860s. By the late 1970s the cattle business had been sold.

== Natural landmarks ==
- Big Canyon (City of Newport Beach)
- Black Star Canyon (Orange County Parks)
- Bommer Canyon (City of Irvine)
- Buck Gully (City of Newport Beach)
- Coal Canyon Ecological Reserve (California Department of Fish and Wildlife)
- Crystal Cove State Park (California Department of Parks and Recreation)
- Fremont Canyon Wilderness Area (Orange County Parks)
- Irvine Lake (Serrano Water District)
- Irvine Regional Park (Orange County Parks)
- Laguna Coast Wilderness Park (Orange County Parks)
- Limestone Canyon Regional Park (Orange County Parks)
- Mountains to Sea Trail
- Orchard Hills Park and Trail (City of Irvine)
- Peters Canyon Regional Park (Orange County Parks)
- Quail Hill (City of Irvine)
- San Joaquin Marsh Wildlife Sanctuary (Irvine Ranch Water District)
- Upper Newport Bay (Orange County Parks)
- William R. Mason Regional Park (Orange County Parks)
- Weir Canyon Wilderness Area (Orange County Parks)

=== Adjacent areas ===
- Aliso and Wood Canyons Regional Park (Orange County Parks)
- Crystal Cove State Marine Conservation Area (California Department of Fish and Wildlife)
- Laguna Beach State Marine Reserve & Laguna Beach State Marine Conservation Area (California Department of Fish and Wildlife)
- Santiago Oaks Regional Park (Orange County Parks)
- Upper Newport Bay State Marine Conservation Area (California Department of Fish and Wildlife)
- Whiting Ranch Wilderness Park (Orange County Parks)
