= Andrew Do =

Vietnamese-born American politician

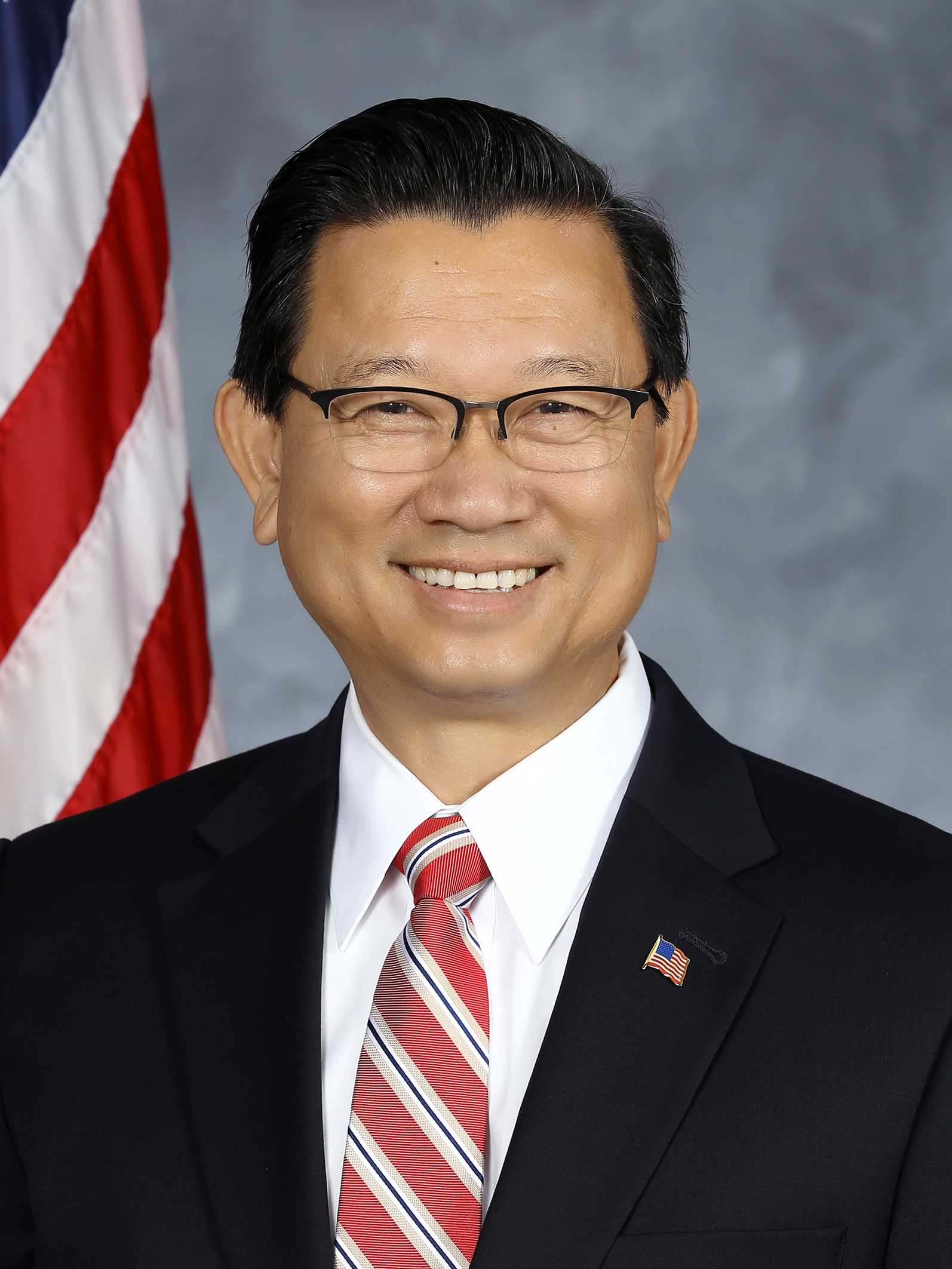
- Official portrait, 2020

Chair of the Orange County Board of Supervisors
- In office January 12, 2021 – January 11, 2022
- Preceded by: Michelle Steel
- Succeeded by: Doug Chaffee
- In office January 9, 2018 – January 8, 2019
- Preceded by: Michelle Steel
- Succeeded by: Lisa Bartlett

Vice Chair of the Orange County Board of Supervisors
- In office January 10, 2023 – January 9, 2024
- Preceded by: Donald P. Wagner
- Succeeded by: Doug Chaffee
- In office January 14, 2020 – January 12, 2021
- Preceded by: Michelle Steel
- Succeeded by: Doug Chaffee
- In office January 10, 2017 – January 9, 2018
- Preceded by: Michelle Steel
- Succeeded by: Shawn Nelson

Member of the Orange County Board of Supervisors from the 1st district
- In office February 3, 2015 – October 22, 2024
- Preceded by: Janet Nguyen
- Succeeded by: Janet Nguyen

Member of the Garden Grove City Council At-Large District
- In office December 9, 2008 – April 12, 2011
- Preceded by: Mark S. Rosen
- Succeeded by: Kris Beard

Personal details
- Born: April 23, 1963 (age 63) Saigon, South Vietnam
- Party: Republican
- Education: University of California, Davis (BA); University of California, Hastings College of Law (JD)

Andrew Hoang Do (Vietnamese: Andrew Đỗ; born April 23, 1963) is an American attorney and former politician who was a member of the Orange County Board of Supervisors for the first district from 2015 to 2024, when he resigned from office as part of an agreement with prosecutors in which he pled guilty to conspiracy to commit bribery. A Republican, he previously served as both chair and vice chair of the board for two and three terms respectively. Do was a candidate for California State Treasurer in 2022, but was eliminated in the primaries. Before serving on the board of supervisors, Do served as a member of the Garden Grove city council and was an Orange County deputy district attorney.

Do has had multiple controversies relating to corruption throughout his political career including pay-to-play violations. Most notably in 2024, he garnered attention after allegations that he used taxpayer money to spend on lavish expenses, such as personal homes, by funneling the money through a non-profit organization run by his 23-year old daughter. The county filed a lawsuit to demand the return of the money, and then the FBI subsequently raided his and his daughter's homes. Ultimately, these allegations would lead to Do's resignation and guilty plea for conspiracy to commit bribery on October 22, 2024.

In June 2025, Do was sentenced to five years in prison for his crime.

== Early life ==
Do fled with his family from Vietnam to the United States following the Fall of Saigon, with only the clothes they were wearing and a "suitcase full of dictionaries." Do grew up in Garden Grove, California and subsequently attended the University of California, Davis. Do received a JD from Hastings College of the Law.

== Career ==
Do served on several professional boards, including the Vietnamese-American Bar Association of Southern California and the Orange County Bar Association.

In 2007, Do served as the chief of staff for Janet Nguyen, a politician from Southern California.

In 2008, Do was a city council member of Garden Grove, California. He was also a deputy district attorney of Orange County as well as an adjunct professor at California State University of Fullerton.

In 2022, Do ran in the California State Treasurer election, but came in third with 17.03% of the vote to Cudahy City Councilman Jack M. Guerrero and incumbent California State Treasurer Fiona Ma in the primaries. According to campaign spending data from Cal-Access, Do’s campaign raised $212,401 until May 21 for the campaign.

=== COVID-19 pandemic ===
During the COVID-19 pandemic, Do has been subjected to racist abuse while serving as supervisor. During an Orange County Board of Supervisors meeting on COVID-19 prevention efforts in July 2021, one speaker, under the pseudonym of "Tyler Durden", told Do: “You come to my country, and you act like one of these communist parasites. I ask you to go the f--- back to Vietnam," despite Do being an American citizen and living in the country for more than 46 years.

=== CalOptima ===
In March 2017, Do attempted to become the supervisor to CalOptima, Orange County's $3.7 billion publicly-funded health insurance plan for low-income citizens. His bid was rejected by the CalOptima board of directors. Do then attempted, but was blocked by state legislators, to take control of CalOptima by proposing that all 5 board members of the OC Board of Supervisors become board members of CalOptima, amid accusations that the takeover effort was motivated by being rejected as chairman, to which Do did not respond. The move was also seen as an attempt to pull CalOptima back from the medical industry and install elected officials instead, after a former county supervisor and lobbyist gave the industry control in 2011.

Do eventually became chairman of CalOptima in 2020, making him the first Vietnamese American to take this seat.

== Improper use of taxpayer money through Viet America Society ==
Between 2020 through 2023, Do accepted up to $550,000 in bribes in exchange for voting to direct up to $13.5 million taxpayer dollars to Viet America Society (VAS), a nonprofit that his then 19-year old daughter Rhiannon Do formed in 2020, without public votes and without naming the organization or revealing the family relationship. The money was granted under the county's emergency authority dealing with COVID-19 and the federal pandemic response to feed needy seniors during the pandemic.

=== Lawsuit ===
In 2024, after VAS failed to substantiate the work and show that meals were actually handed out, Orange County authorities brought on a lawsuit against VAS, accusing Chief Executive and founder Peter Ahn Pham, Secretary Dinh Mai, and Rhiannon Do, of using more than $13 million in taxpayer money on "lavish expenses" such as buying personal homes. Authorities demanded VAS to return $2.2 million (representing the entire two contracts to feed the seniors during the pandemic).

The lawsuit was filed by Orange County Supervisor Katrina Foley who noted that "I just think that's outrageous [...] We wanted to make sure that people who are food insecure had food". It also accuses Aloha Financial Investment and its president Thu Thao Thi Vu of wrongdoing.

VAS eventually hired auditors, but after these auditors signaled that their findings will demonstrate that VAS failed to follow requirements to track the money, they were fired.

The county also demanded a return of another $1 million that Andrew Do directed to another organization, Hand to Hand Relief Organization, where a significant portion was then channeled back to VAS. In addition, another $1 million that was awarded to VSA to maintain the Vietnam War memorial at Mile Square Park was allegedly not completed.

=== FBI raids ===
In August 2024, the FBI raided the homes of Andrew Do and his wife and O.C. Superior Court Assistant Presiding Judge Cheri Pham, their daughter Rhiannon Do, and VAS founder Peter Pham in connection to this investigation. Peter Pham said that situation was a "misunderstanding" and that he "didn't do anything wrong."

A number of local officials and residents called on Andrew Do to resign from his position on the Board of Supervisors. He was since absent from the board meetings. "If Supervisor Do does not resign I will pursue every legal avenue available to have him removed from office [...] Andrew please resign," said Supervisor Katrina Foley.

=== Plea deal and resignation ===
On October 22, 2024, the United States Department of Justice announced that Do agreed to plead guilty to conspiracy to commit bribery as a result of the Viet America Society contracts and Do's direction of taxpayer money. The federal charges involved more than $550,000 in bribes for directing and voting in favor of more than $10 million in COVID funds to his daughter's charity.

U.S. Attorney Martin Estrada commented that "he functioned like Robin Hood in reverse, and his conspirators stole money from the poor to give to themselves."

Do resigned from the office as part of this agreement and pled guilty in the U.S. District Court for the Central District of California in Santa Ana later in October. The plea agreement required Do to forfeit any assets connected to the bribery scheme, including the Tustin property his daughter purchased in 2023. It also required him to pay back the bribes he and his daughters had received.

On June 9, 2025, Do was sentenced to five years in prison for his crime.

== Other allegations of corruption ==
Do has been beset with allegations of corruption during his career, which has led community groups as well as the Orange County Register (which had previously repeatedly endorsed Do) to call for his resignation.

=== Residency ===
In the 2008 Garden Grove City Council race, Do's political opponent filed a complaint that he lives in a North Tustin home he purchased in 2002 making him ineligible to sit on the Garden Grove council. No charges were brought against Do. In 2015, during the Board of Supervisors race, Do was likewise accused of residing outside of 1st district in North Tustin (3rd district). Do acknowledged that he bought the Westminster residency in the 1st district to meet residency requirements to run for office in 2015. However, Do denied the allegations that he still lives in his North Tustin home, but declines to state whether it is being rented out or not.

=== Pay-to-play violations ===
In July 2022, the non-partisan California Fair Political Practices Commission published a stipulation revealing that Do -- while serving on the board of CalOptima in 2016 and 2017 -- has steered government contracts to two lobbyists that were donors of his political campaigns. This is in violation of California's pay-to-play restrictions. The commission noted that "Do made, participated in making, and attempted to use his official position to influence governmental contracting decisions involving a participant who contributed to his campaign". The commission revealed a sum of roughly $5,000 that were donated by the two lobbyist, but that Do did not disclose this or recuse himself from the vote to award the government contracts to them. The commission imposed an administrative penalty of $12,000 and that Do has "apparently" agreed to this fine.

In the same stipulation, the commission also noted that Do violated regulations on a series of behested payments for a statue project at Mile Square Park by filing the required reports late. The commission noted that "Payments made at the behest of elected officials—including charitable donations—are a means by which donors may seek to gain favor with elected officials. Timely reporting of such activity serves to increase public awareness regarding potential attempts to influence in this manner."

The commission met again on July 21, 2022, to determine these cases.

On March, 2026, the Orange County Board of Supervisors' commissioned forensic financial audit revealed Do and his chief of staff Chris Wangsaporn side stepped anti-abuse procedures and awarded contracts to vendors who donated to his campaign. The report found more inappropriate flow of money than previously reported. Do directed money to Aloha Financial Investment and Hua Development, businesses linked with Peter Pham. Do also authorized an $814,650 county payment to 360 Clinic, a COVID test provider suspected of double billing. In total, investigators found $3.4 million of uncollectable claims, a practice illegal under state and federal laws. Both Do and Wangsaporn were central in this pay-to-play scheme.

Auditors also discovered the Board of Supervisors established a process that aided Do's abuse of public money by setting up a procedure that lacks competitive bidding, transparency, and public approval. The report also stated the county lacked rules that requires details to be documented on invoices, and therefore made it more difficult to see how taxpaper money were being spent.

=== Failure to disclose familial relationship at homeless services mistrial ===
While testifying as a witness during a major trial regarding a homeless services center, Do failed to disclose that his wife was the assistant presiding judge, leading to a mistrial.

=== As CalOptima chairman ===
After becoming CalOptima chairman, he hired one of his longtime advisors to the newly created chief of staff role, paying $282,000 plus benefits. A former CalOptima chairman was among those raising concern given the advisor had less than a year of hospital administration experience.

In 2021, Do led the effort on the board to appoint Blair Contratto as the hospital administrator of CalOptima, despite Contratto lacking experience in Orange County. This caused a rare public rebuke by the Hospital Association of Southern California noting that diverging from the traditional appointment of a local leader "disregards the breadth of knowledge and experience our hospital leaders bring to CalOptima". Under Do's leadership as board chair, CalOptima has increasingly become under fire for its substantial turnover in key positions and salaries having jumped significantly (from $400,000 to at least $560,000 for the CEO position).

In February 2022, the board abruptly fired its entire in-house legal team of attorneys and support staff in a closed session meeting.

Do also presided over and approved many salary-increases for CalOptima officers, including a 50% salary increase of CEO Michael Hunn to a base salary of $841,000 per year in 2022 and HR Director, Brigette Hoey's salary increase from $300,000 year to $512,000 per year.

Former chairman of CalOptima, Dr. Paul Yost, voiced concerns that “those are healthcare dollars that ought to be going to provide healthcare for the neediest population.” and the organization is now facing a state probe for controversial hiring and contracting practices with a report due in April 2023.

In February 2023, a day after a local non-profit news agency reported on a state investigation into CalOptima's hiring and pay practices including controversially large salary hikes, Do abruptly resigned as chair.

== See also ==
- Orange County Board of Supervisors#January 27, 2015, First District special election
