= Silverado Fire =

2020 wildfire in Southern California

- Part of the 2020 California wildfires
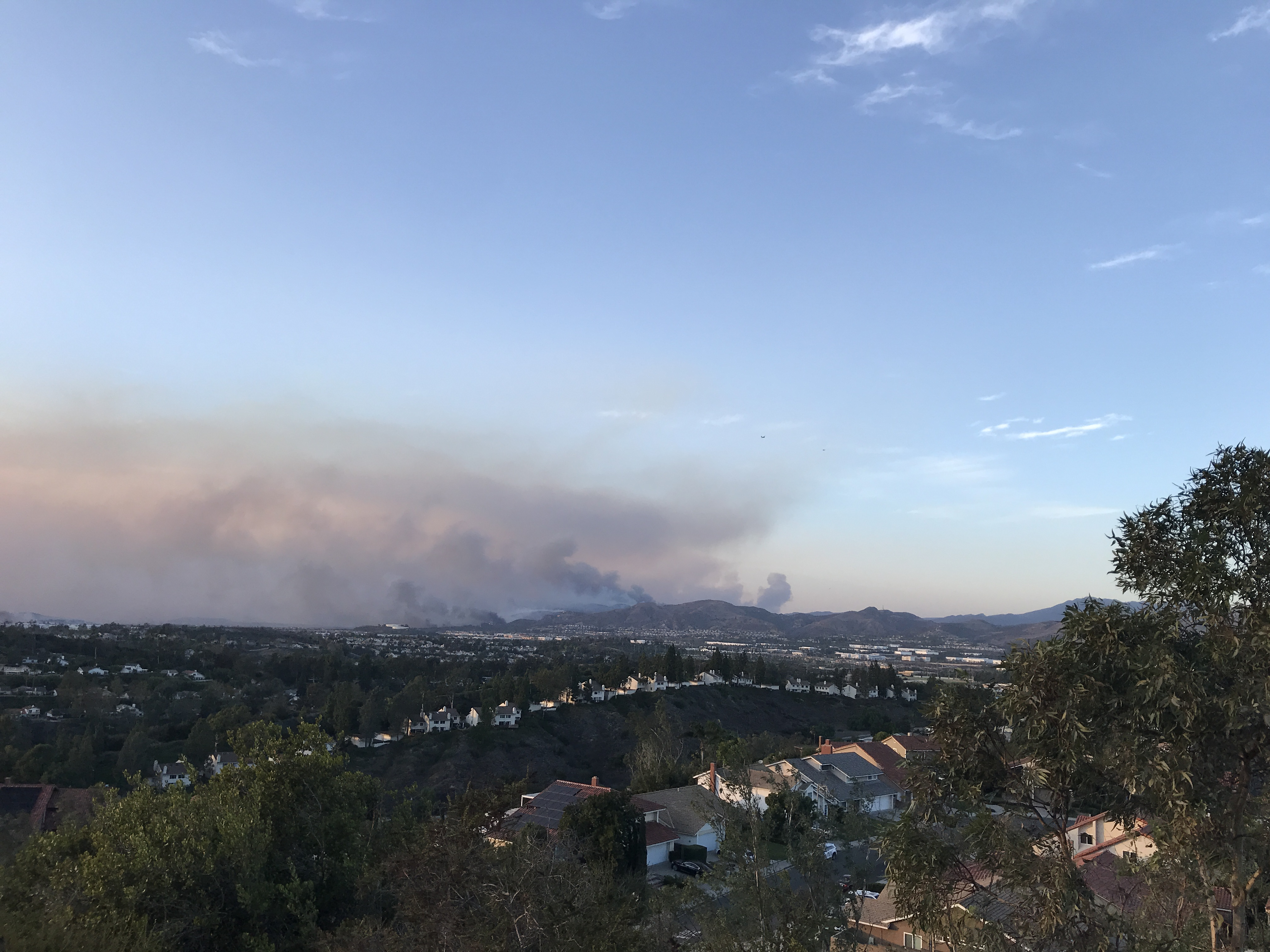
- Silverado Fire seen near sunset on October 26, 2020 from Mission Viejo
- Date: October 26, 2020 –; November 7, 2020
- Location: Santiago Canyon and Silverado Canyon roads, east of Irvine, in southern Orange County, California
- Coordinates: 33.737957°N 117.730187°W

Statistics
- Burned area: 13,390 acres (5,419 ha)

Impacts
- Injuries: 2

Ignition
- Cause: Under Investigation

Map
- Location in Greater Los Angeles Location in California

The Silverado Fire was a wildfire that burned in October and November 2020 in southern Orange County, California northeast of the city of Irvine. The fire started on October 26 around 6:47 AM near Orange County Route S-18 (Santiago Canyon Road) and Silverado Canyon Road, fueled by strong Santa Ana winds gusting up to 80 miles per hour (130 km/h) and low humidity. The fire initially moved south from Loma Ridge toward the Orchard Hills, Northwood and Portola Springs communities of Irvine before moving southeast through Limestone Canyon and toward the communities of Foothill Ranch and Lake Forest. The fire burned in a path similar to that taken by the 2007 Santiago Fire, mostly through terrain that had not seen significant burning in the 13 years since that fire. Authorities announced 100% containment on November 7, 2020.

The cause of the fire remains under investigation. Southern California Edison officials stated in a letter to the California Public Utilities Commission that they suspect a "lashing wire" from one of T-Mobile's telecommunication lines may have contacted one of its electric lines.

== Timeline ==
Mandatory evacuation orders were issued by the Orange County Fire Authority and CalFire for approximately 90,000 residents and schools in the area. The fire also caused California State Route 241 to temporarily shut down. Orange County Fire Authority Chief Brian Fennessy stated, "The winds were extraordinary even by Santa Ana standards. Fire spread is exceeding more than anything I've seen in my 44 years."

Although there were no civilian casualties, two Orange County firefighters, 26 year old Dylan Van Iwaarden and 31 year old Phi Le, were severely burned battling the wildfire, receiving second and third degree burns over half their bodies and hospitalized in critical condition. Van Iwaarden had burns on 65% of his body and Le had burns on 50% of his body. The firefighters were reportedly trapped by flames in what may have been a failed backburning attempt. Six other firefighters in the same crew reported singes to their hair and eyebrows. A blood drive was held in Santa Ana to help the firefighters, and over $215,000 was raised in two days via online crowdsourcing to aid with medical expenses.

On November 7, firefighters reached 100% containment of the fire.

On February 17, 2021, Van Iwaarden was released from the Orange County Global Medical Center in Santa Ana after spending 114 days there, undergoing a medically induced coma and 17 surgeries.

In February 2024, state regulators fined Southern California Edison $2.4 Million for violations involving equipment owned by them and shared with T-Mobile.

== Impact ==
The fire consumed 13,390 acres, destroying one structure and two minor structures, and damaging five others. The burn scar of the fire aided in the stoppage of the Bond Fire, another wildfire that took place in the area only a month later.

The fire partially destroyed a 6.1-acre area along Agua Chinon Creek and around Limestone Canyon Regional Park that had recently been the subject of a five-year project to restore the nature to its native setting. The seed farm facility used for the project was also burned during the wildfire. Some trees and vegetation were burned while others weren't in what officials described as a "checkerboard pattern" of damage.

The burn scars of the Silverado and Bond fires coupled with a winter rain storm caused a series of mudflows on the evening of January 28, 2021. Mudflows occurred near the Bond Fire scar causing road blockages; however, structural damages were not reported in the Silverado Fire burn scar area.

== Gallery ==
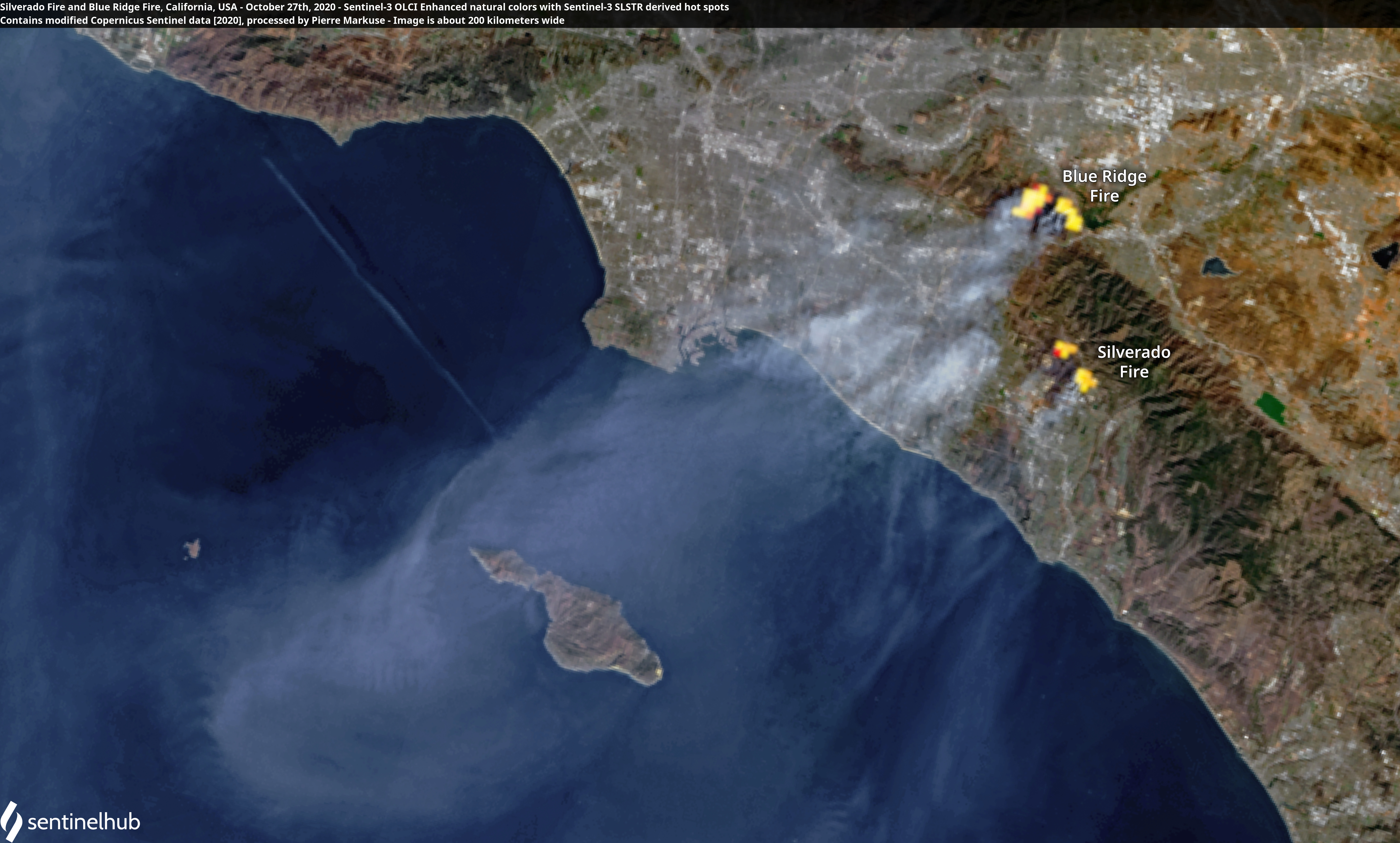

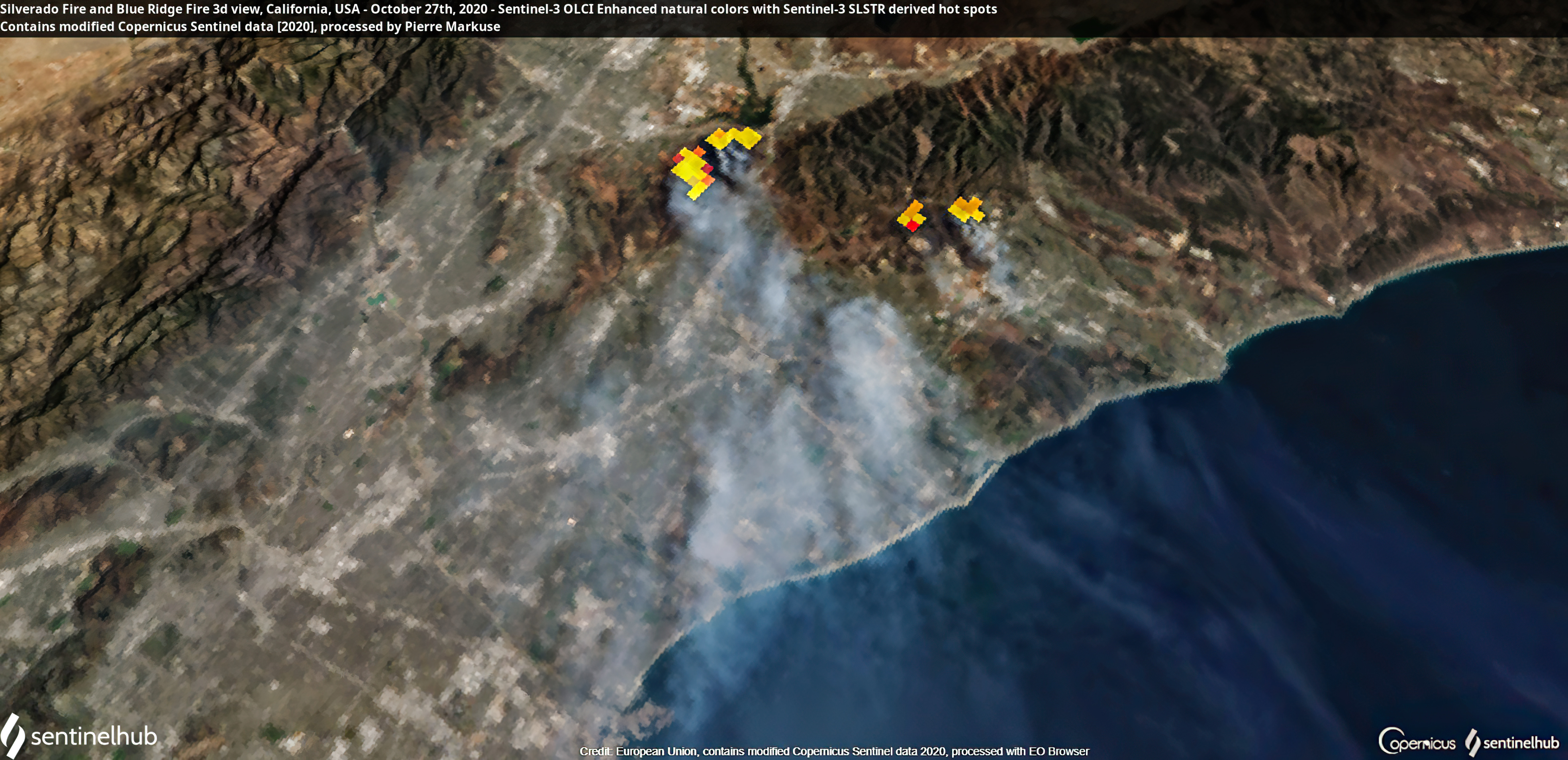

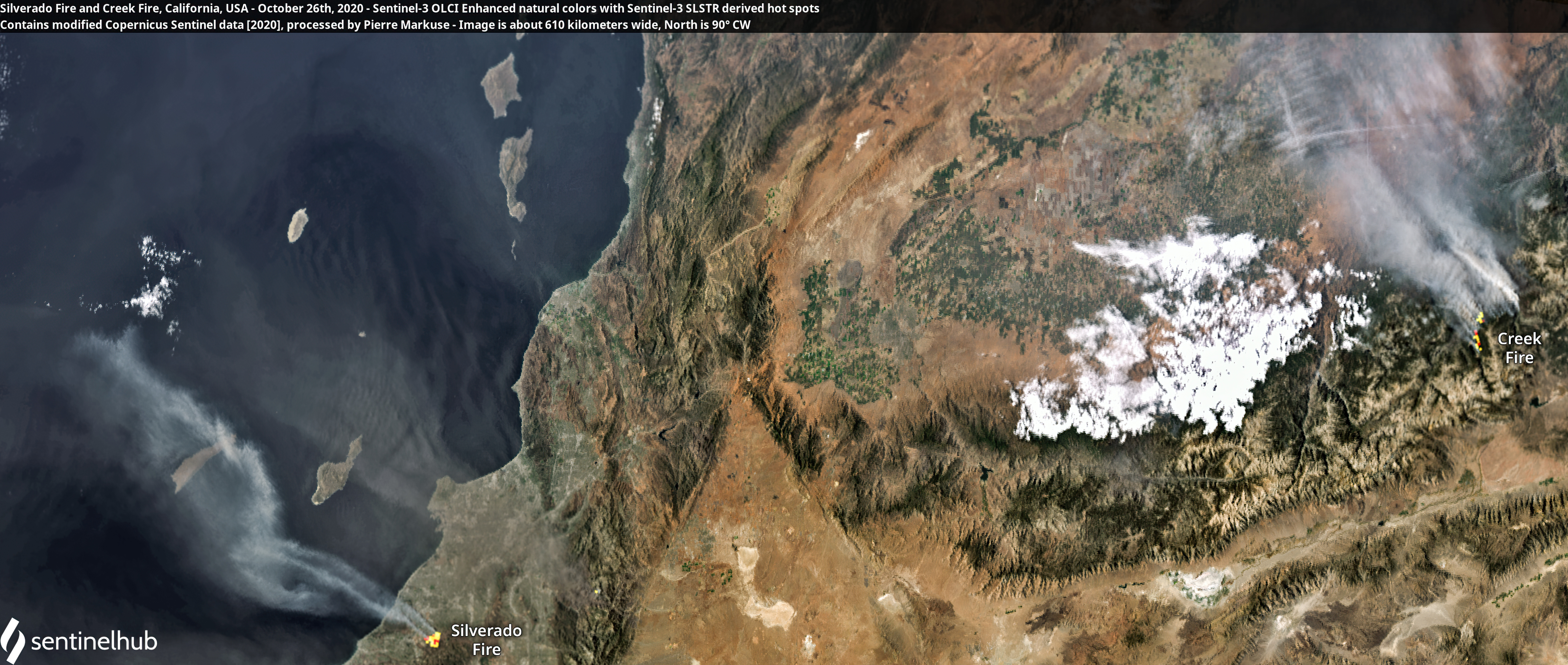

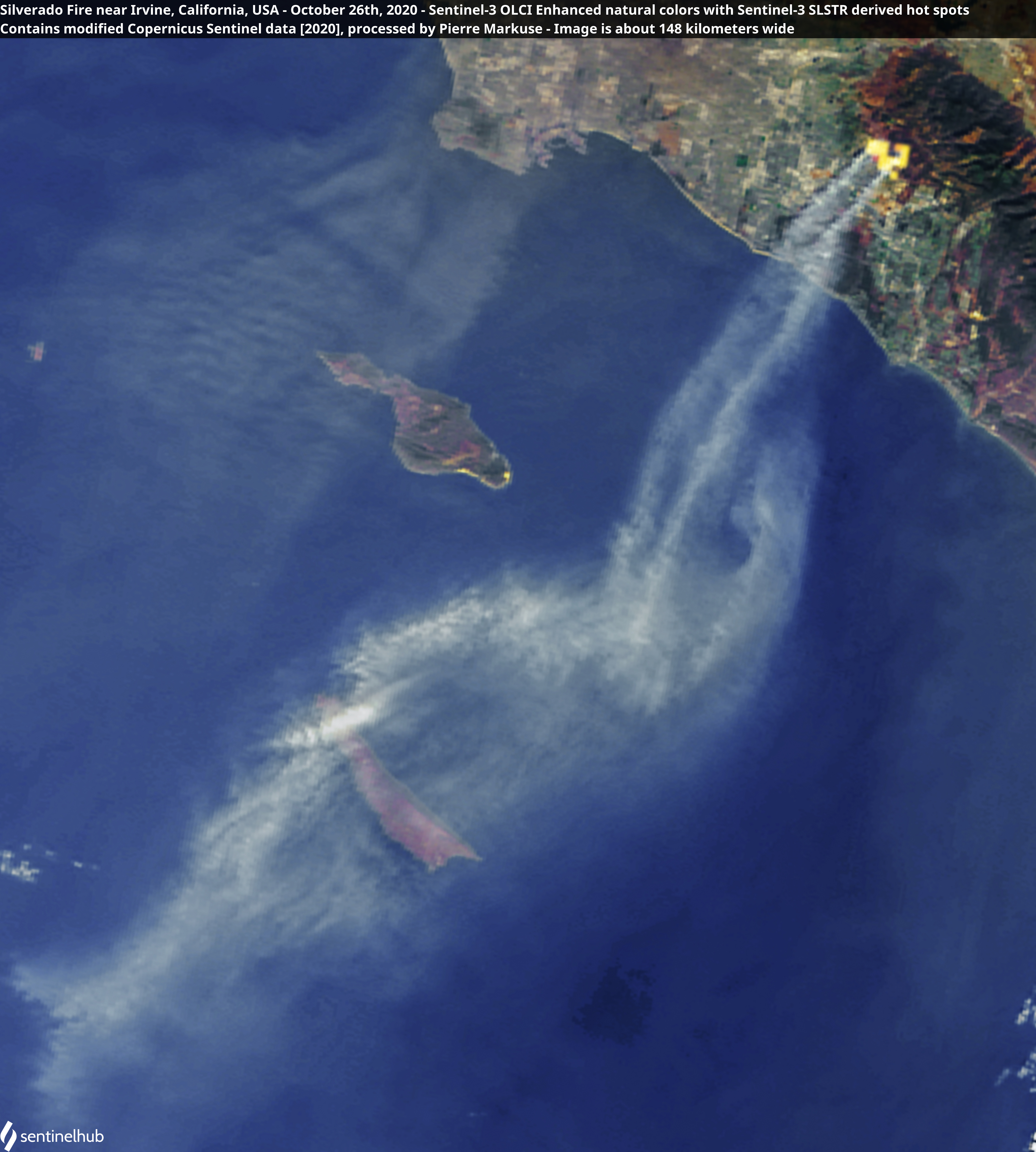

== See also ==
- 2020 California wildfires
