= CalOptima =

Publicly funded health insurance plan

Logo

CalOptima is a publicly funded health insurance plan for low-income citizens for Orange County, California. With an annual budget of US$4 billion serving 940,000 members as of July 2022, it is also the single largest county organized health insurer in the state. Its current CEO is Michael Hunn.

== Services ==
CalOptima administers health insurance programs for the county's low-income children, adults, seniors and people with disabilities. The agency is administrating a street medicine program to bring care to homeless people, implementing Medi-Cal, California's Medicaid program. CalOptima serves nearly 940,000 members with a network of more than 7,200 primary care doctors and specialists at 30 hospitals.

== History ==
=== 1993–2020: Creation ===
In 1993, the Orange County Board of Supervisors created CalOptima as an entity to manage care for the county residents covered by Medi-Cal. It later spun-off as a standalone organization. Paul Yost, the director of cardiothoracic anesthesia at St. Joseph Hospital, served on CalOptima's Board from 2001 to 2009. In 2017, the CalOptima Board of Directors elected Paul Yost as chair.

=== 2020–2022: Andrew Do ===
In March 2017, politician Andrew Do attempted to become the supervisor to CalOptima. His bid was rejected by the CalOptima board of directors. Do then attempted, but was blocked by state legislators, to take control of CalOptima by proposing that all 5 board members of the OC Board of Supervisors become board members of CalOptima. When a fellow supervisor said the takeover effort was motivated by being rejected as chairman, Do did not respond and instead reiterated his qualifications to be chairman. The move was also seen as an attempt to pull CalOptima back from the medical industry and install elected-officials instead, after a former county supervisor and lobbyist gave the industry control in 2011.

Do eventually became chairman of CalOptima in 2020, making him the first Vietnamese American to take this seat. At this time, he hired Veronica Carpenter, one of his longtime advisors, to the newly created chief of staff role, paying $282,000 plus benefits. Multiple former CalOptima chairmen raised concern given Carpenter having less than a year of hospital administration experience.

In 2021, Do led the effort on the board to appoint Blair Contratto as the hospital administrator of CalOptima, despite Contratto lacking experience in Orange County. This caused a rare public rebuke by the Hospital Association of Southern California noting that diverging from the traditional appointment of a local leader "disregards the breadth of knowledge and experience our hospital leaders bring to CalOptima". Under Do's leadership as board chair, CalOptima has increasingly become under fire for its substantial turnover in key positions and salaries having jumped significantly (from $400,000 to at least $560,000 for the CEO position).

In February 2022, the board abruptly fired its entire in-house legal team of attorneys and support staff in a closed session meeting.

In February 2023, a day after a local non-profit news agency reported on a state investigation into CalOptima's hiring and pay practices including controversially large salary hikes, Do abruptly resigned as chair.

=== 2022–present: Michael Hunn ===
In 2021 Michael Hunn, a former Catholic priest and CEO from different hospitals, stepped in to act as interim CEO of CalOptima after the previous CEO Richard Sanchez retired. Under Hunn's leadership, he directed a $100 million upgrade to the agency's IT infrastructure which promises same-day approval of treatment requests and payment of claims.

== Salary controversy ==
During Andrew Do's tenure as chairman, CalOptima leadership approved many salary-increases for officers, including a 50% salary increase of CEO Michael Hunn to a base salary of $841,000 per year in 2022 and HR Director, Brigette Hoey's salary increase from $300,00 year to $512,000 per year.

Former chairman Paul Yost voiced concerns that "those are healthcare dollars that ought to be going to provide healthcare for the neediest population." and the organization is now facing a state probe for controversial hiring and contracting practices with a report due in April 2023.

State Assemblywoman Sharon Quirk-Silva stated that she was "shocked" by the salary boost and that the board's decision "seems to not really take into consideration the constituents they’re serving" and requested a state audit into the agency's finances. The audit is currently underway with a report due in April 2023.

The investigation led to then-chair Andrew Do's sudden resignation.
