= Bond Fire =

2020 wildfire in Southern California

- Part of the 2020 California wildfires
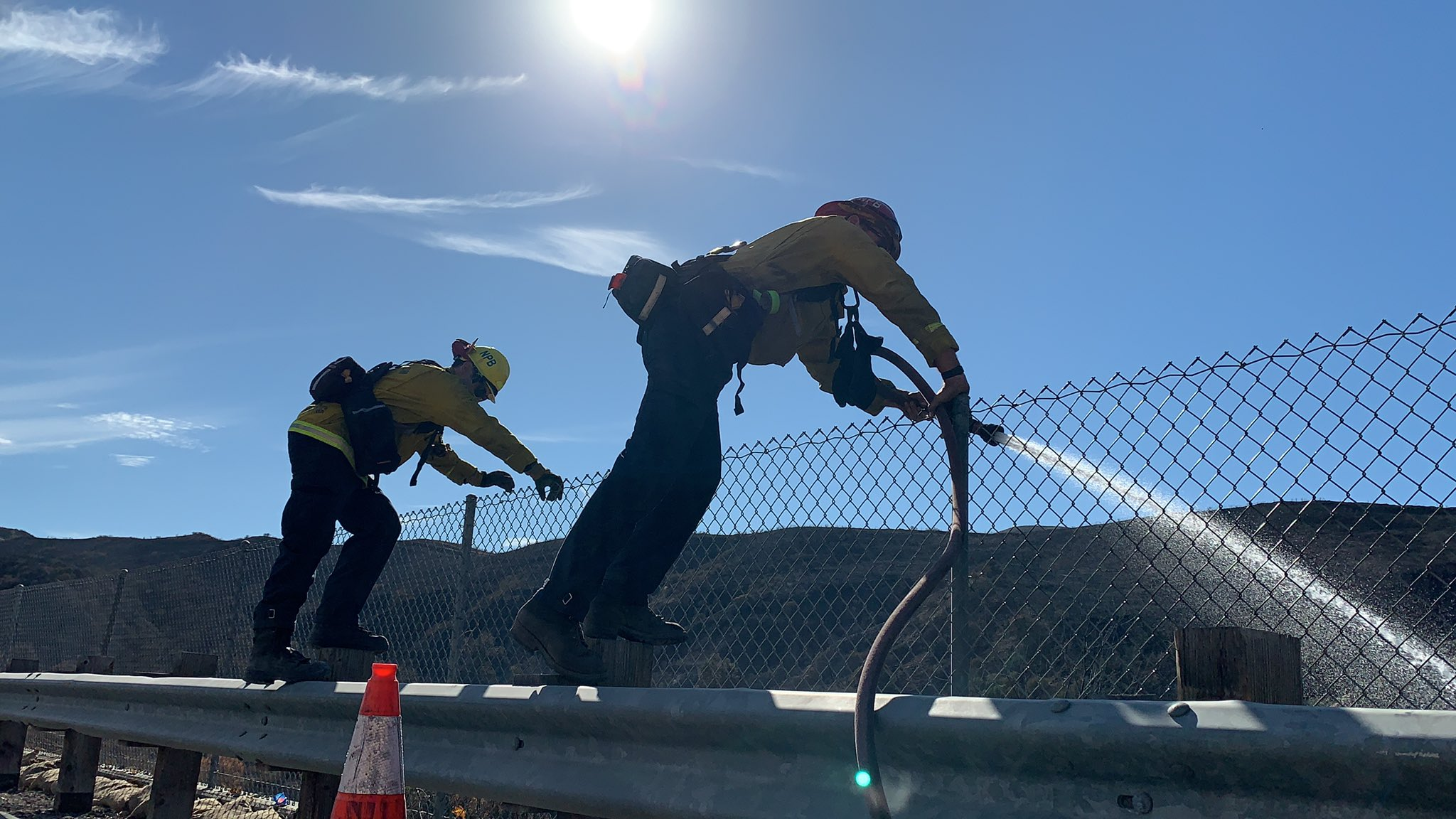
- Two firefighters battling a Bond Fire hotspot on December 5
- Date: December 2, 2020 –; December 10, 2020
- Location: Santiago Canyon, Orange County, California
- Coordinates: 33.777°N 117.638°W

Statistics
- Burned area: 6,686 acres (2,706 ha)

Impacts
- Injuries: 2
- Structures lost: 31

Ignition
- Cause: House fire

Map
- Location in California

The Bond Fire was a wildfire that burned 6,686 acres (2,706 ha) in the Santiago Canyon area of Orange County, California in December 2020. The fire caused evacuations of 25,000 residents and injured 2 firefighters. The fire was very close to the burn scar of the Silverado Fire, which took place in October 2020.

== Timeline ==
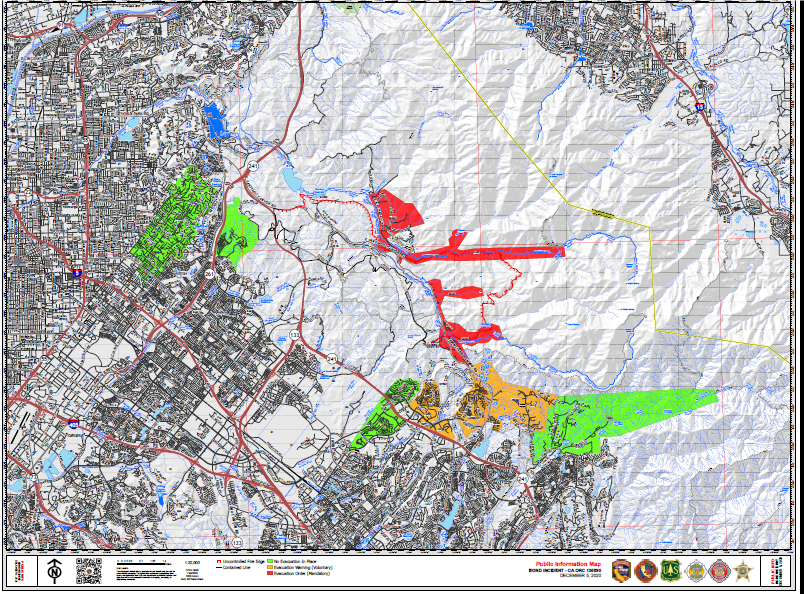
A map from December 6 showing communities under mandatory evacuation in red and those under voluntary evacuation in yellow

The fire was first reported on December 2, 2020, in the unincorporated community of Silverado. Authorities identified a home on a street called Bond Way as the source of the fire, thus becoming the event's namesake. The communities of Silverado Canyon, Williams Canyon, and Modjeska Canyon were placed under mandatory evacuation in the early morning of December 3, and nearby Portola Hills was also evacuated later on. On December 4, two firefighters from the Cleveland National Forest division of the United States Forest Service suffered injuries while battling the blaze. The two were treated on the scene and sent to a hospital for further evaluation. It was later reported that one firefighter had injured their leg, the other was bruised, and both were released from the hospital the same day. On December 6, authorities lifted all mandatory evacuations and allowed canyon residents to return to their homes. By December 7, the fire was at 70% containment, which at that time, already destroyed 31 structures. The fire was fully contained on December 10, 2020.

== Impact ==
On December 1, the day before the fire, Southern California Edison had cut power to Silverado Canyon due to dangerous wildfire conditions. The lack of electricity caused issues with the reporting of the fire, and the outage continued through the height of the event. The fire forced the evacuations of 25,000 people and caused the air quality to be very poor. Residents said that "they can't walk or drive", and that fires are a routine. Rancho Soñado, home of the Orange County Department of Education's "Inside the Outdoors" learning program, was mostly destroyed by the wildfire. Shelter was not provided due to the COVID-19 pandemic. An eight-year-old female mountain lion tagged as F121, one of approximately 15 to 20 known to live in the Santa Ana mountain range, was killed by the wildfire.

The Bond Fire left much of the vegetation in its path burned, depriving the soil of stability. On January 28, 2021, a voluntary evacuation order was issued in anticipation of a rain storm that posed a threat of mudflows. California Conservation Corps crews worked that day to remove debris that would become dangerous in the event of a mudflow. Heavy rain that night caused mudflows that blocked some roads in Silverado Canyon, rendering them impassible. At least one home was evacuated mandatorily and Orange County Public Works crews helped to clear the mud with bulldozers.

A second series of mudflows occurred in Silverado Canyon on the morning of March 10, 2021. The mudflows prompted the mandatory evacuations of residents in Silverado, Williams, and Modjeska Canyons, all as a result of their Bond Fire burn scar proximity. The mudflows damaged and trapped several cars, but no injuries were initially reported.

On December 14, 2021, a large storm swept through the Southern California area, triggering mudflows in Silverado Canyon for the third time since the Bond Fire. Foothill areas experienced up to 7 inches of rain during the storm. The three communities near the fire burn scar were mandatorily evacuated, but firefighters still had to rescue several residents. The day after the storm, five houses in Silverado Canyon were red-tagged, several cars were damaged, and many trees were uprooted.

On December 23, 2021, Silverado Canyon experienced more mudflows related to the winter rain frequent in the region's Mediterranean (Csa) climate. The event impacted several roads in the community, particularly near the intersection of Silverado Canyon Road and Olive Drive. Another mandatory evacuation order was issued on December 30 but ultimately was downgraded to voluntary status as the rain was not as severe as expected.

== Fire growth and containment progress ==
Fire containment status Gray: contained; Red: active; %: percent contained;
Date	Area burned acres (km^{2})	Containment
Dec 2	1,000 (4)	
Dec 3	7,200 (29)	
Dec 4	6,400 (26)	
Dec 5	7,375 (30)	
Dec 6	7,375 (30)	
Dec 7	7,375 (30)	
Dec 8	6,686 (27) (Note: Acreage downgraded to 6,686 due to more accurate mapping of the fire.)	
Dec 9	6,686 (27)	
Dec 10	6,686 (27)	

== See also ==
- 2020 California wildfires
- Silverado Fire
- Santiago Fire
