= 200 and 400 Spectrum Center Drive =

Twin office buildings in Irvine, California

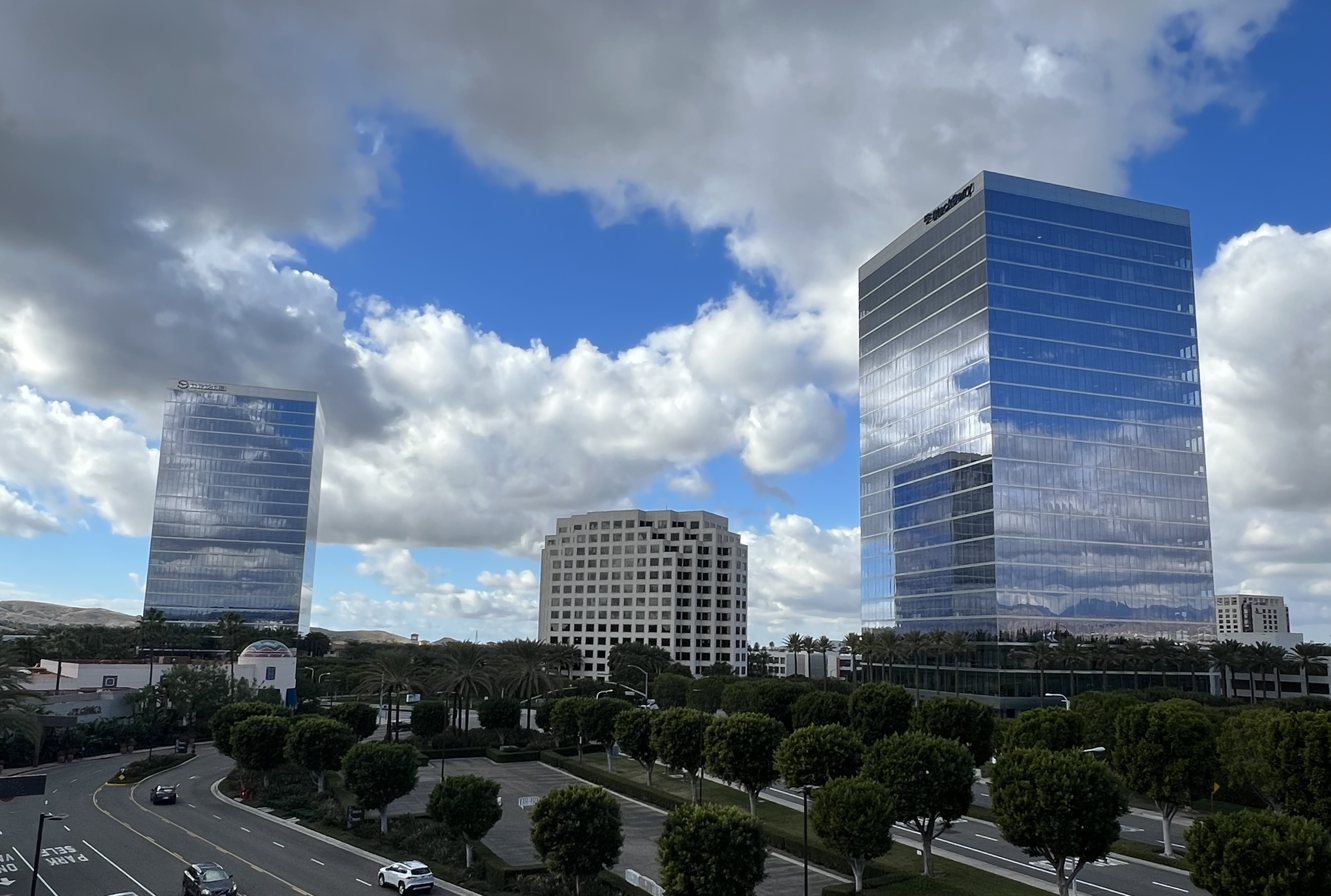
- 200 Spectrum Center Drive (left) and 400 Spectrum Center Drive (right) in 2023
- Interactive map of the 200 and 400 Spectrum Center Drive area

General information
- Architectural style: Contemporary modern
- Location: 200 Spectrum Center Drive; 400 Spectrum Center Drive; Irvine, California, U.S.
- Coordinates: 33°39′15″N 117°44′45″W
- Year built: 2014–2017
- Opened: February 25, 2016 (200 Spectrum); September 13, 2017 (400 Spectrum)
- Owner: Irvine Company

Height
- Height: 323 feet (98 m)

Technical details
- Floor count: 20
- Floor area: 852,000 square feet (79,200 m^{2})

Design and construction
- Architect: Michael Bischoff
- Architecture firm: Pei Cobb Freed & Partners

Other information
- Public transit access: OC Bus: 86, 90

200 and 400 Spectrum Center Drive, referred to collectively as the Spectrum Center towers, are a pair of twin office buildings in the Irvine Spectrum district of Irvine, California. At 323 feet (98 m), the towers are the tallest two buildings in Orange County with 400 Spectrum being 3 inches (76 mm) taller than its twin. Each building contains 426,000 square feet (39,600 m^{2}) of floor space. The Irvine Company-owned towers were designed by New York-based Pei Cobb Freed & Partners with Michael Bischoff acting as lead architect on the project. The towers were built in separate phases – 200 Spectrum broke ground in 2014 and opened in 2016 while 400 Spectrum broke ground in 2016 and opened in 2017.

== History ==
The master-planned city of Irvine, California, was incorporated in 1971. The Irvine Spectrum district of the city was planned in 1985 and major construction began in the mid-1990s, including the Irvine Spectrum Center shopping mall. In the 21st century, the area became home to major businesses such as Blizzard Entertainment and Taco Bell, among others.

Plans for a 323 foot (98 m) tall office tower at the Irvine Spectrum were first announced in 2014. A parking lot with the address 8055 Irvine Center Drive was selected as the site of the project. During an Irvine Planning Commission meeting on July 3, 2014, officials promised the tower would be LEED Gold certified and advertised the building plan as having a "satin" stainless steel finish and a "necklace of palm trees" around its perimeter. The commission voted unanimously to approve the plan.

In January 2016, car manufacturer Mazda, who had previously operated its North American headquarters in Irvine since 1987, announced it would move its offices to the new complex. The company's 10-year lease stipulated the use of five floors and 113,000 square feet (10,500 m^{2}). The move was completed in June 2017. Mazda's logo and wordmark were placed on the top of the building.

Two other major tenants were announced in January 2016 – a lease of 22,000 square feet (2,000 m^{2}) for video game company Curse Inc. and a lease of 44,000 square feet (4,100 m^{2}) for coworking space provider WeWork. Including Mazda, the three tenants accounted for 40% of 200 Spectrum's leasable space. Other smaller tenants brought the building's pre-lease total to 60%.

On February 25, 2016, 200 Spectrum was inaugurated with a grand opening. The Irvine Company chose not to disclose the building's construction cost and noted that the building was one of the final major projects planned for the Spectrum district. Around the time of the opening, 200 Spectrum was "one of Irvine’s most photographed structures." Construction for 400 Spectrum was underway at the time of 200 Spectrum's completion.

In September 2017, software firm Cylance was announced as the lead tenant for 400 Spectrum, set to occupy 136,000 square feet (12,600 m^{2}) on floors 6 through 11. The company was previously based at Irvine Towers in the South Coast Metro area. Email company SendGrid was also announced as a major tenant, contracted for 22,000 square feet (2,000 m^{2}) on the fourth floor. The building was officially opened on September 13, 2017.

In 2019, BlackBerry Limited became the lead tenant of 400 Spectrum when it bought out Cylance. Its logo and wordmark were placed at the top of the building.

== Background ==
The towers' tenants include law firms, financial service providers, and tech companies, among other industries. The presence of tech company tenants in the buildings was noted due to the tendency for such businesses to occupy spread-out campuses, such as Infinite Loop and Googleplex.

In 2017, rent was reported to range from US$4.35 to $5.50 per square foot, compared to a county average of $2.75 per square foot for office space. The rent in 400 Spectrum was 9% more expensive than the rent in 200 Spectrum.

== Architecture ==
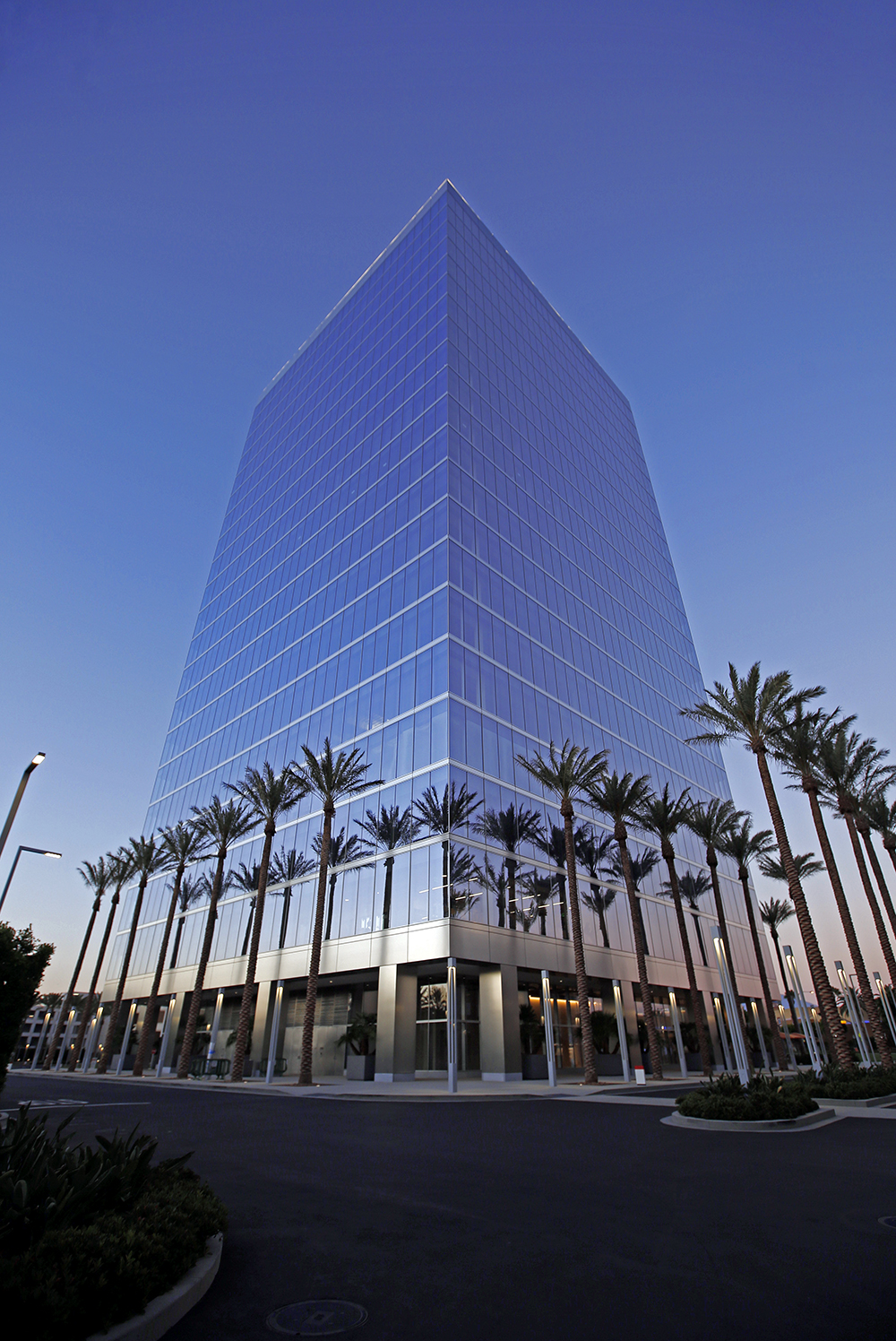
200 Spectrum, one of the two identical buildings

The two towers were designed by New York-based architectural firm Pei Cobb Freed & Partners with Michael Bischoff serving as the project's lead. 200 and 400 Spectrum Center Drive stand at the same rounded height of 323 feet (98 m); however, 400 Spectrum is marginally taller by 3 inches (76 mm), making it the tallest building in Orange County, California. The previous titleholder was 520 Newport Center Drive, another Irvine Company-owned office building standing at 315 feet (96 m) in neighboring Newport Beach. When 200 Spectrum's plans were announced in 2014, a company spokesman said that the point of its height was to maximize office space rather than to compete for the title of the tallest building in a given region, as has been the case with many skyscraper projects around the world. Both towers have 20 floors but their top floors are listed as the 21st as the thirteenth floor is skipped in the directory.

Both towers consist of a concrete column structure with floor-to-ceiling glass curtain walls manufactured by Viracon. According to an Irvine Company executive, the glass for the buildings was difficult to acquire because the 1,776 foot (541 m)-tall One World Trade Center, the tallest building in the Western Hemisphere, was under construction at the same time and was using the same type of glass.
