= Irvine Spectrum =

District of Irvine in California, US

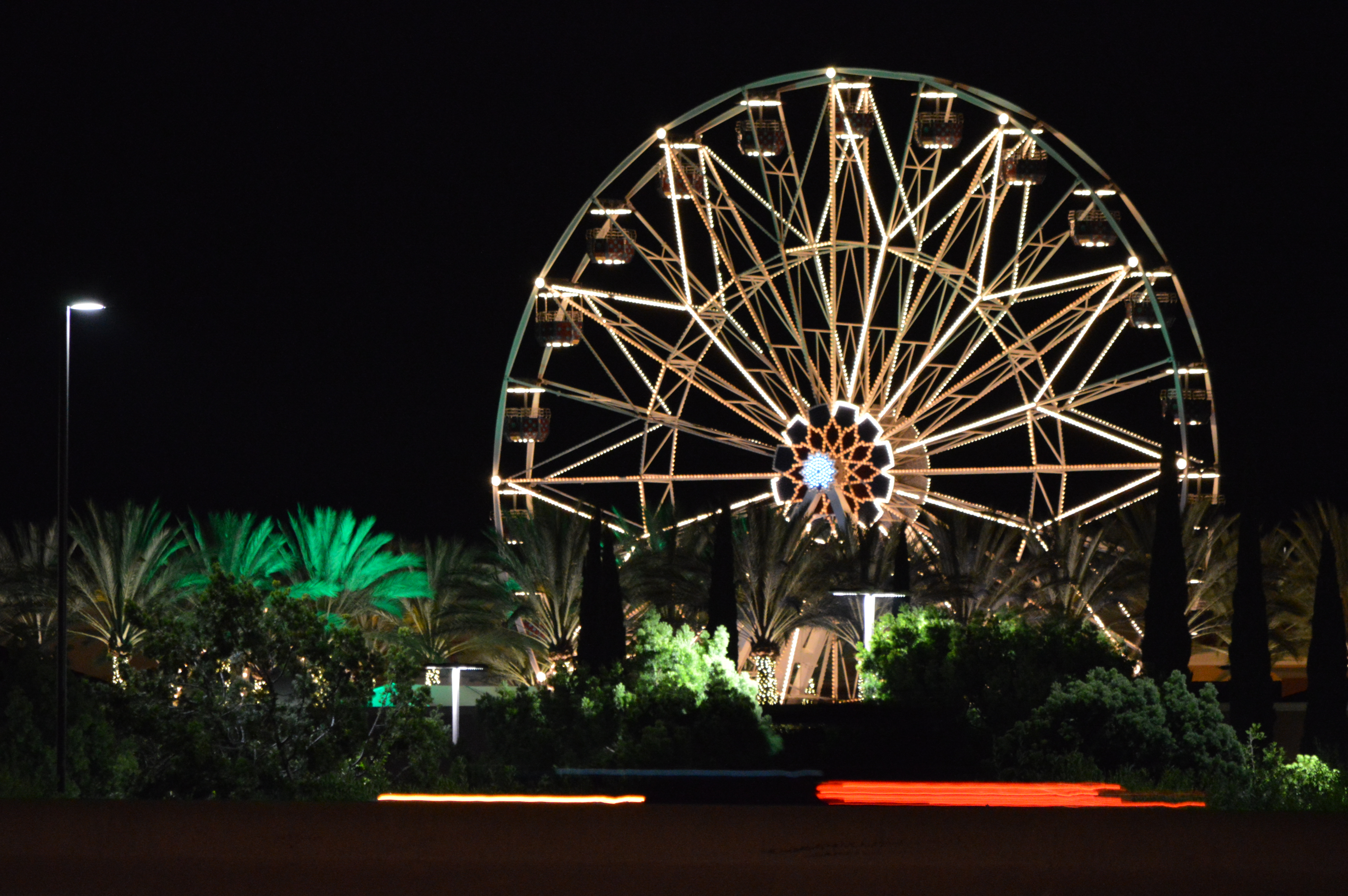
"Giant Wheel" at the Irvine Spectrum Center as seen from across I-5

The planning areas of Irvine; Irvine Spectrum consists of areas 13 and 31–35

Irvine Spectrum is a district in southeastern Irvine, Orange County, California, centered on the Irvine Spectrum Center shopping and lifestyle center. It is also an edge city, a concentration of business, shopping, and entertainment outside a traditional downtown, as defined by Joel Garreau in his 1991 book Edge City: Life on the New Frontier.

The Irvine Spectrum Center is anchored by Target, Nordstrom and a large Edwards Cinema multiplex. Office space is leased by the Irvine Company, which promotes Irvine Spectrum as Orange County's new tech hub and its new "Downtown" of office space, with 13 million square feet of office space in over 40 office "communities". The area also includes apartments, and is immediately adjacent to two other districts that by Garreau's abovementioned criteria would make them part of the edge city:

- Irvine Medical and Science Complex to the west, containing Cal State Fullerton Irvine Center, Hoag Hospital Irvine and a Kaiser Permanente hospital
- Irvine Technology Center to the east, containing Alton Marketplace (big box center with a Costco and Walmart), the Irvine Transportation Center, with Amtrak and Metrolink train service, and the FivePoint Amphitheater

== See also ==
- El Toro Y
