= 71 South Wacker =

Office skyscraper in Chicago, Illinois

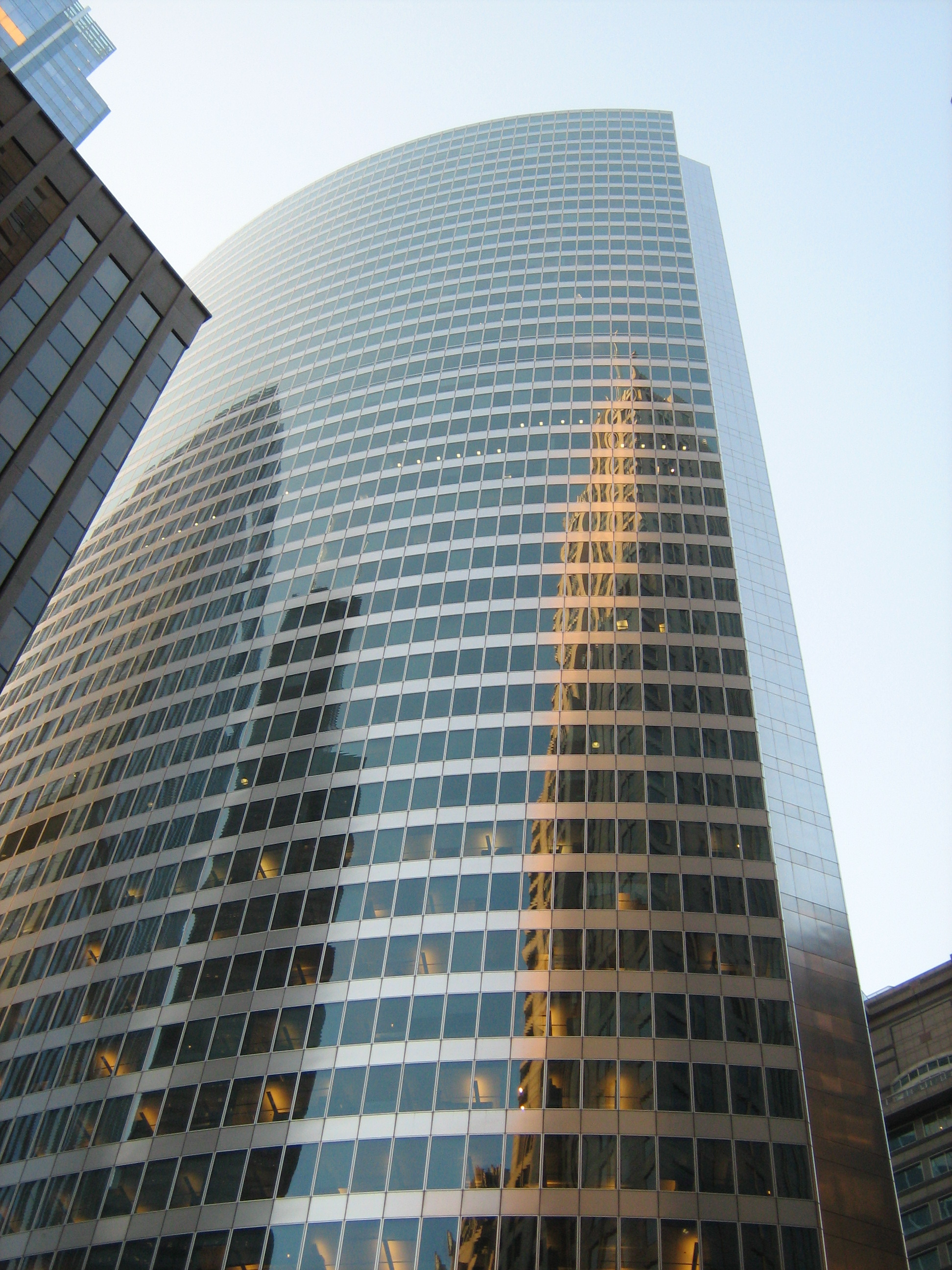
- 71 South Wacker
- Interactive map of the 71 South Wacker area

General information
- Location: Chicago Loop, Chicago, Illinois, United States, 71 South Wacker Drive, Chicago, IL, 60606
- Coordinates: 41.8809420°N 87.6359218°W
- Opening: 2005
- Owner: Irvine Company

Height
- Height: 679 ft (207 m)

Technical details
- Floor count: 48
- Floor area: 1,765,000 sq ft (164,000 m^{2})

Design and construction
- Architect: Pei Cobb Freed & Partners
- Developer: Higgins Development Partners LLC
- Structural engineer: Halvorson and Partners

Website
- https://www.irvinecompanyoffice.com/locations/chicago/west-loop/71-south-wacker.html

71 South Wacker (previously known as the "Hyatt Center") is an American office tower in Chicago completed in 2005. The 48-story skyscraper stands at 679 feet (207 m) on 71 South Wacker Drive. It is owned by the California-based Irvine Company, which also owns One North Wacker and 300 North LaSalle.

The architects were Pei Cobb Freed & Partners. The tower is notable for the lozenge shaped plan and the resulting convex curves of the steel and glass north and south facades.

The 1,765,000 square foot (164,000 m^{2}) building contains 65,000 cubic yards (50,000 m^{3}) of concrete and 12,000 tons of structural steel. It took about 2,700 truckloads to excavate the building's foundation, and 1,300,000 man hours over nearly two years to finish. Twenty-eight high speed elevators serve the building.

The building features extensive landscape design by Chicago's Hoerr Schaudt Landscape Architects, both inside and outside, from bamboo groves, complete with fountains, lining the modern lobby to lush green grass in raised curved stone planters on the building's south side. 71 South Wacker also contains art panels by Keith Tyson and a trompe-l'œil mural by Ricci Albenda.

The anchor tenants of the building include Colliers International, Benesch Law, EVRAZ North America, Columbia Threadneedle Investments and Mayer Brown LLP. The floor 2 cafe is available to all tenants and registered guests.

The building was formerly the headquarters of the Hyatt Corporation, who relocated their headquarters to 150 North Riverside in 2017. After Hyatt relocated their headquarters, its name was removed from the building's title, and the building began using its address of 71 South Wacker as its title.

== Previous concept ==
Originally, the Pritzker Realty Group intended for British architect Lord Norman Foster to design what was then called Pritzker Tower to house the offices of the Global Hyatt Corporation and other family holdings. However, plans for the 60-story building were scrapped due to financial considerations and the uncertainty of global events after the terrorist attacks on 9/11.

== Security ==
Being the first high rise built in Chicago post 9/11, Kroll Security Group, the Security Consulting and Engineering division of Kroll, Inc., was hired as the security consultant for the project providing complete security systems design.

== Lobby ==
Iconic 50-ft height atrium lobby with floor-to-ceiling glass, gently curving zen gardens and jet-mist granite walls project a bold-confidence with tranquil reflection to inspire from the outside in.

== See also ==
- Tour EDF - a similar building designed by the same firm near Paris
- List of skyscrapers
- List of tallest buildings in the United States
- List of tallest buildings in Chicago
- World's tallest structures
