= Boulevard Theatres =

American movie theatre based in Wichita, Kansas

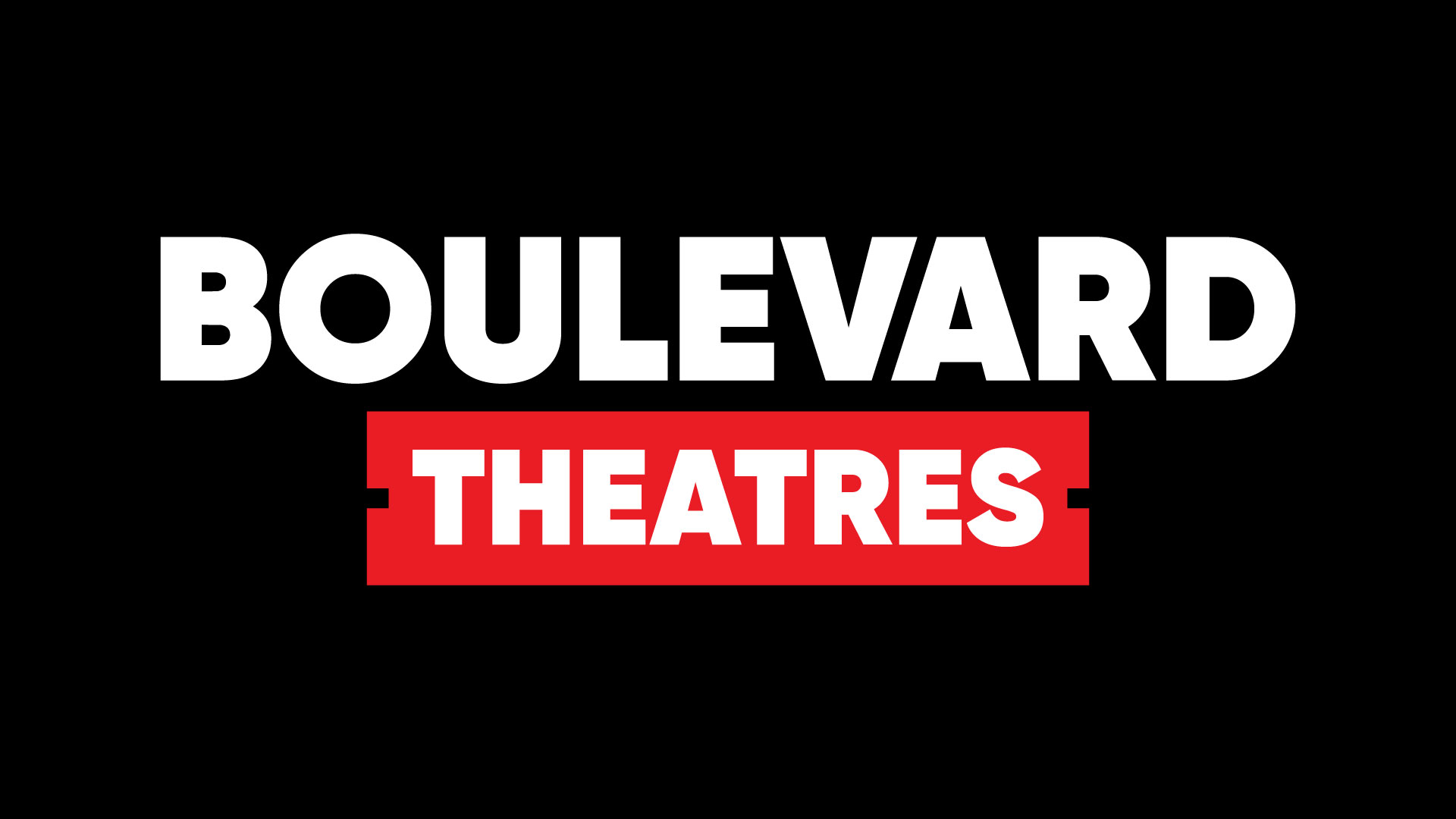
- Company type: Privately held company
- Industry: Movie theatres
- Founded: 2021
- Founders: Tyler Cooper, Ryan Blasdel
- Headquarters: Wichita, Kansas
- Number of locations: 2 theatres with 13 screens (2024)
- Areas served: Kansas
- Website: Official Website

Boulevard Theatres is a movie theater chain based in Wichita, Kansas, United States. It was founded by Tyler Cooper and Ryan Blasdel in 2021 and is privately-owned.

== Overview ==
Boulevard Theatres opened its first location May 2022 in Towne West Square. The location is in the former Warren Theatres Movie Machine, a 5 screen multiplex. In preparing this theatre for opening, Boulevard Theatres installed new projectors and sound, refreshed the auditoriums and remodeled the lobby and concessions area, introducing Wichita's first fully self-serve movie theatre concessions.

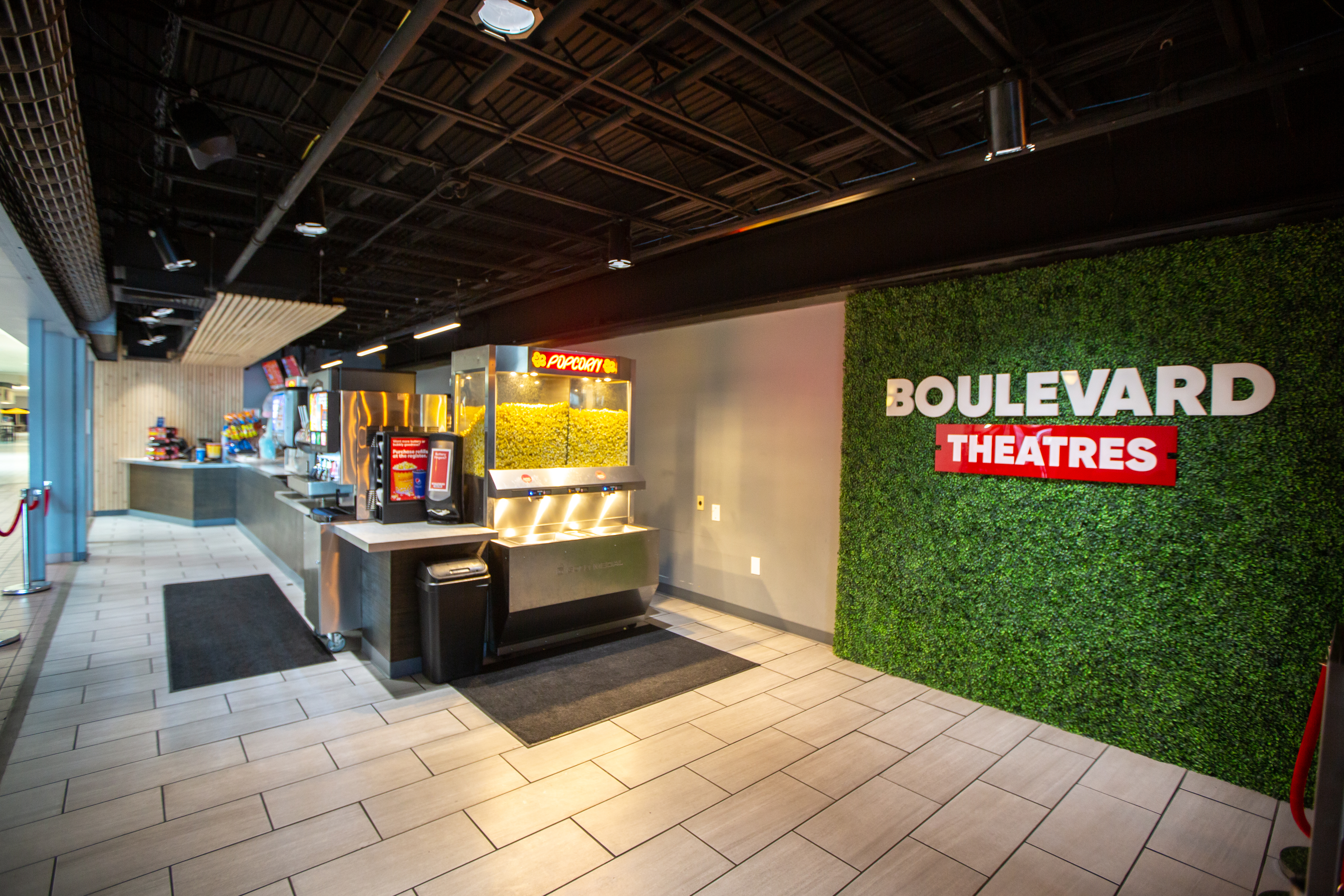
Lobby and Concessions area of Boulevard Theatres at Towne West.

== Expansion ==
In January 2024, news broke that Boulevard Theatres was planning to purchase the Regal Warren location in the Old Town neighborhood of Wichita.

At the end of September 2024, Boulevard Theatres announced that it had purchased the Old Town theatre, and would reopen it. On December 20, 2024, the new location began to welcome guests during its "soft opening" while further renovations continued.

== Amenities ==
In April 2025, the chain announced that it would bring in Wichita's first self-pour taps for alcoholic beverages. The system allows guests to pour their own alcoholic beverage, beer, wine or cocktails, once they have checked-in and received a RFID bracelet. Guests then pour their drink and pay only for what they pour.
