= Edwards Theatres =

Defunct American movie theater chain

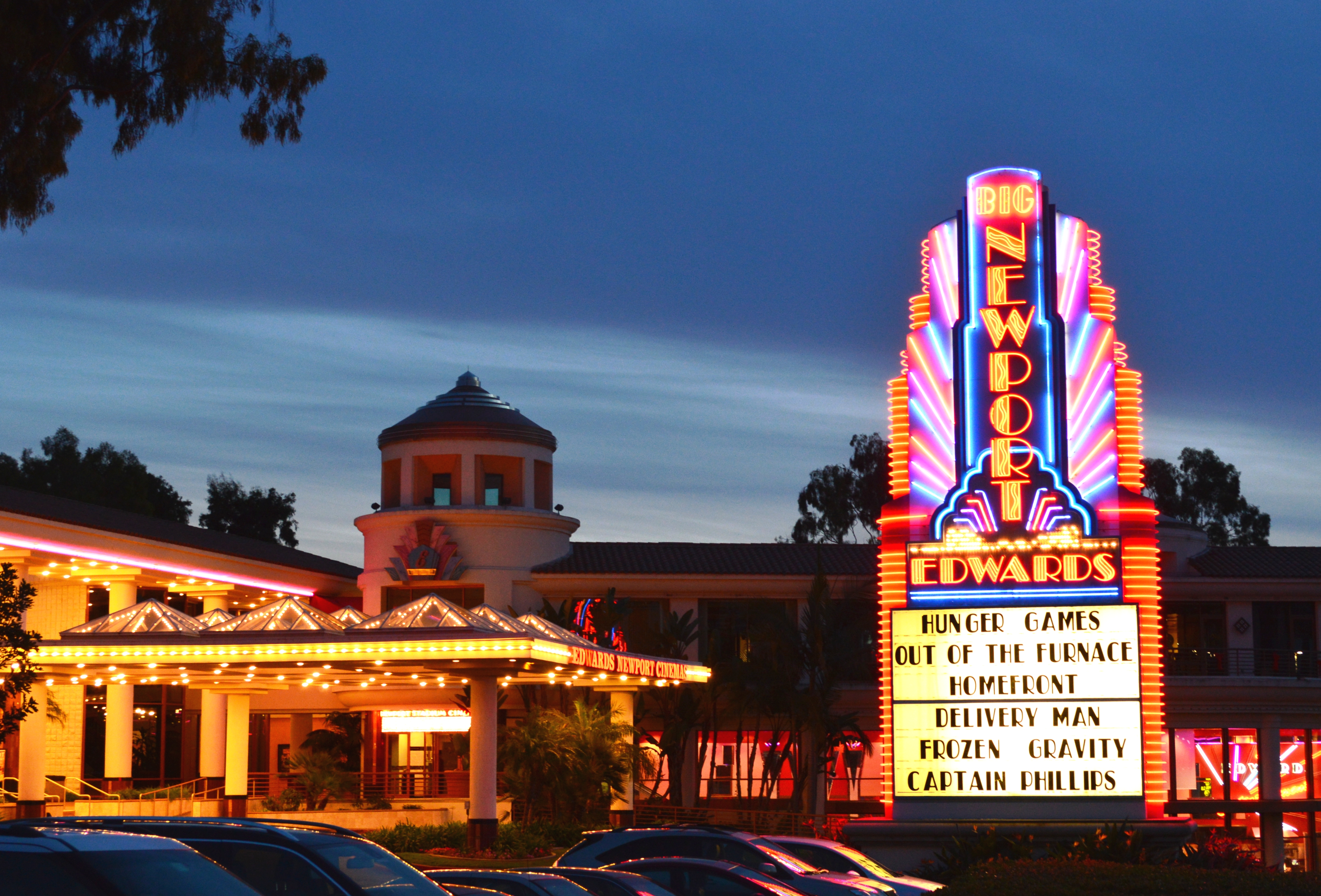
- The brand’s flagship location in Newport Beach, California
- Type: Subsidiary/In-name-only unit of Regal Entertainment Group
- Founded: 1930; 96 years ago in Monterey Park, California, U.S.
- Founder: William James Edwards Jr.
- Fate: Consolidated into Regal Entertainment Group
- Parent: Regal Entertainment Group

Edwards Theatres (also known as Edwards Cinemas) is an American movie theater brand which is owned and operated as an in-name-only unit of Cineworld through its Regal Cinemas chain. Originally founded in 1930 by William James Edwards Jr., it operated independently as a major theater chain in the Southern California region until it was consolidated with Regal Cinemas and United Artists Theatres into the Regal Entertainment Group (REG) in 2002. Although REG took over all Edwards operations, many theaters in Southern California still bear the Edwards name for marketing purposes.

== History ==
The Edwards Theatres chain informally began in 1930 when William James Edwards Jr. acquired the Mission Theatre in Monterey Park, California, a former silent movie theater. Edwards had purchased the building at the age of 23 despite advice against it from a theater proprietor he paid $200 to appraise the property. The Monterey was put for sale due to its poor condition, primarily from unruly adolescents who frequented it. Edwards reopened the old Mission Theatre with sound equipment as the Monterey Theatre on October 9, 1930. It premiered with the Howard Hughes blockbuster Hell's Angels. Following a renovation, the Monterey began attracting a tamer crowd.

In 1934, Edwards purchased and renovated the Raymond Theatre in Pasadena, California. In 1939, Edwards opened a two-screen theater in Alhambra, California, which he later claimed to be the first multiplex in the United States.

During World War II, Edwards Theatres experienced growth as the war-related economic boom in the United States coupled with rations on other consumer goods drove cinema attendance. In 1948, Edwards's longstanding problem of competing with studio-owned theaters for film reels was alleviated when the U.S. Supreme Court landmark decision in United States v. Paramount Pictures, Inc. barred studios from owning theaters.

By 1961, Edwards Theatres operated 90 screens in Southern California; however, James Edwards retired that year after suffering a heart attack. Edwards sold most of the company's holdings but retained 10 screens in the San Gabriel Valley. In 1963, Edwards was motivated by new development in Orange County, where his Newport Beach home was located, to come out of retirement to open a theater in Costa Mesa. In 1967, Edwards Theatres opened its flagship theater in Newport Beach.

In 1995, Edwards Theatres constructed a $27 million, 21-screen multiplex in Irvine, California, as an inaugural tenant of the Irvine Spectrum Center shopping mall. The complex was dubbed "the Big One" due to its immense size – both its 6,444 total seats and 158,000 square feet (14,700 m^{2}) of space were new world records at the time. When the multiplex opened on November 22, 1995, its most prominent feature was Toy Story, being shown on three screens.

On March 21, 1996, Edwards Theatres opened a 22-screen multiplex in Ontario, California, which it advertised as the "world's largest stadium theater". The facility opened across the street from AMC Theatres's 30-screen complex at Ontario Mills due to a rivalry between James Edwards and AMC executive Stanley Durwood.

On April 26, 1997, Edwards Theatres founder James Edwards Jr. died of a heart attack at the age of 90 at his Newport Beach home. Days after Edwards's death, the company announced plans to build 18 new multiplexes, including a Boise, Idaho, location that would be the company's first facility outside of California. Company president James Edwards III announced the news and stated that his father was involved in the planning of the expansion up until his death. Edwards III denied speculation that the company would be sold to a larger movie theater chain.

On August 23, 2000, Edwards Theatres filed for Chapter 11 bankruptcy. The decision occurred at a time when other companies, such as Carmike Cinemas and United Artists Theatres, were similarly filing for bankruptcy. Edwards, like its peers, was suffering from the financial woes of overzealous building and expansion in the mid-to-late 1990s. The move placed the fate of the Edwards family's ownership in control of its primary lender, Bank of America.

In September 2001, Philip Anschutz took control of the Edwards Theatres chain alongside minority partner Oaktree Capital Management. At the time of the acquisition, the chain operated 699 screens and had a debt total estimated between $272 million and $350 million. The Edwards family was compensated with $5 million and a portion of the company's stock. In 2002, Anschutz merged Edwards operations with his other properties, Regal Cinemas and United Artists Theatres, to form Regal Entertainment Group. Regal continues to operate several theaters with their original Edwards branding.

On 7 September 2022, Cineworld, the current parent company of Edwards Theatres, filed for Chapter 11 bankruptcy.
