= Irvine Company =

American real estate development company

The Irvine Company LLC

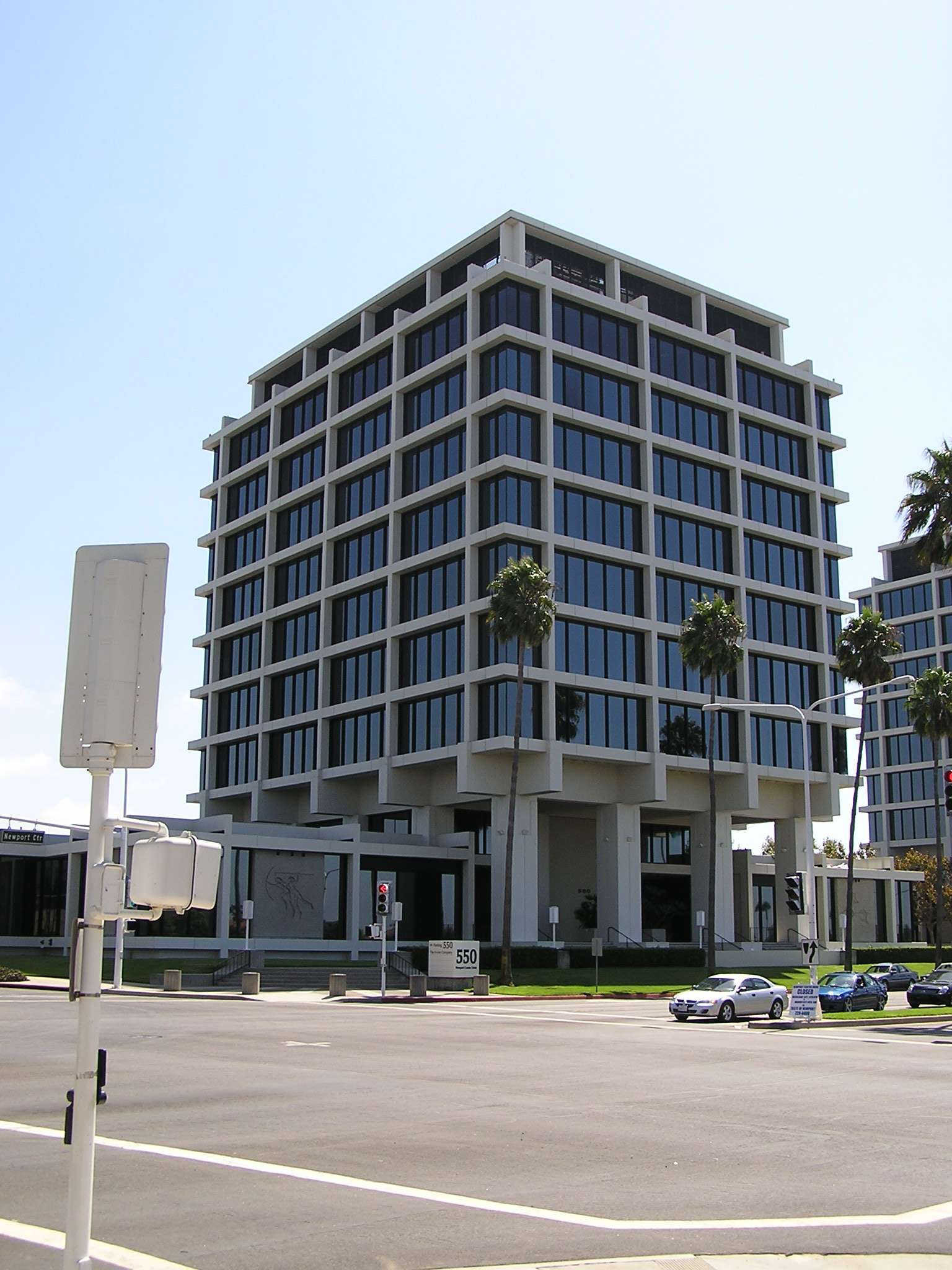
- Irvine Company headquarters in Newport Beach, California
- Type: Private
- Industry: Real estate; Community development; Property investment; Urban planning; Urban design
- Founded: 1864; 162 years ago
- Founder: James Irvine; Llewelyn Bixby; Benjamin Flint; Thomas Flint
- Headquarters: Newport Beach, California, U.S., United States
- Number of locations: Chicago, New York City, Los Angeles County, Orange County, San Diego County, Silicon Valley
- Area served: California
- Key people: Donald Bren (chairman)
- Website: www.irvinecompany.com

The Irvine Company LLC is an American private company focused on real estate development. It is headquartered in Newport Beach, California, with a large portion of its operations centered in and around Irvine, California, a planned city of more than 300,000 people mainly designed by the Irvine Company. The company was founded by the Irvine family and is currently wholly owned by Donald Bren.

Since the company is private, its financials are not released to the public. However, Bren is the wealthiest real estate developer in the United States with a net worth of $15.3 billion as of April 2021.

== History ==
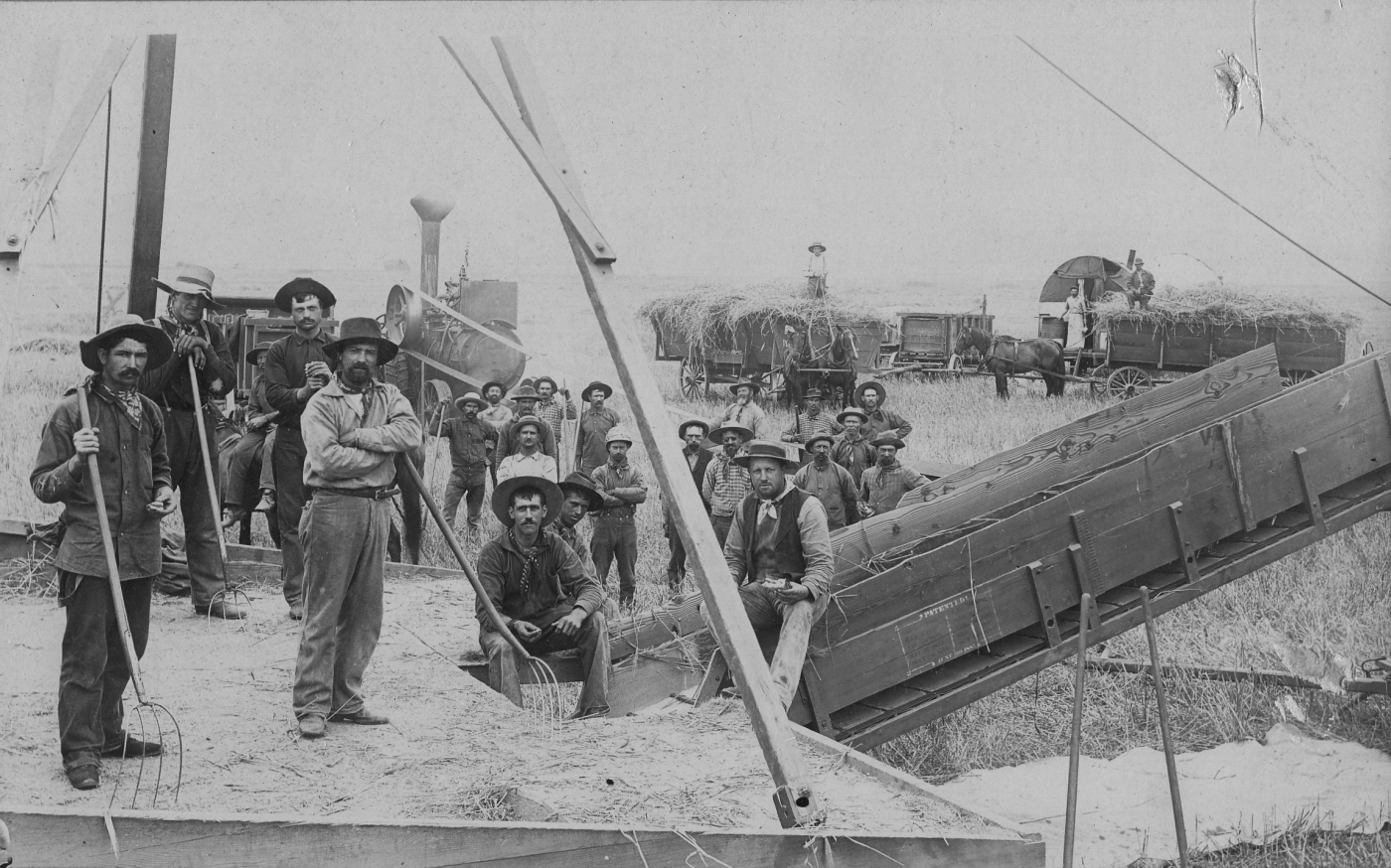
Hay harvest in 1891 on the Irvine Ranch

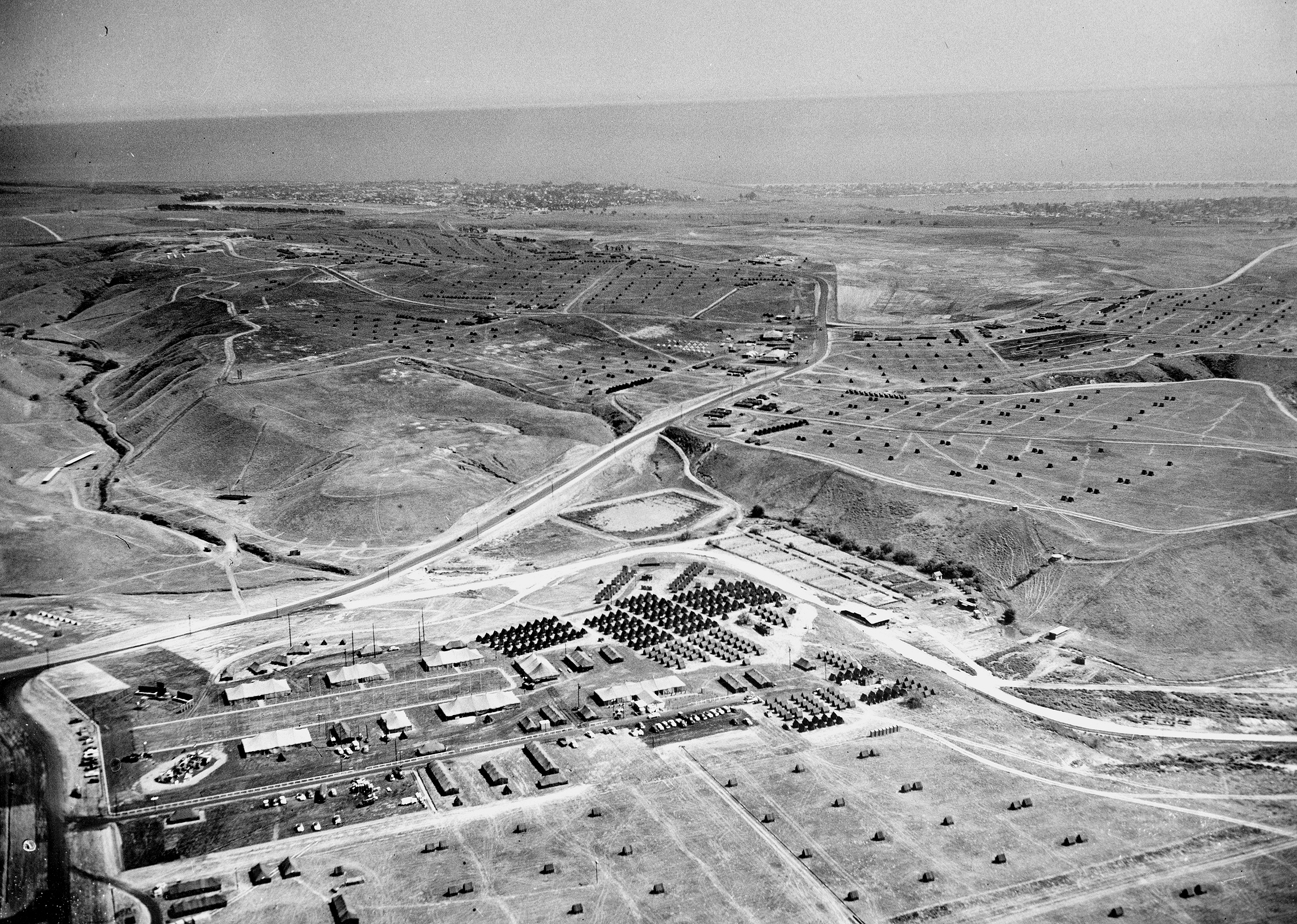
1953 Boy Scout Jamboree site

The Irvine Company traces its history to a 185-square-mile (480 km^{2}) ranch founded by James Irvine I, Benjamin and Thomas Flint, and Llewellyn Bixby in 1864 by combining three adjoining Mexican land grants. A drought in 1864 killed the livestock of Jose Antonio Sepulveda, forcing him to sell his coastal Rancho San Joaquin to Irvine and his partners. In 1866 they purchased Rancho Lomas de Santiago from William Wolfskill; largely unfarmable due to its steep, hilly terrain, it had been used mainly as a sheep ranch. In 1868 Flint, Bixby and Irvine were among the claimants of a title lawsuit that divided Rancho Santiago de Santa Ana.

Unlike other early Newport Beach landowners, Irvine and his partners had no interest in subdividing and selling, intent, instead, upon identifying the most lucrative agricultural uses for their enormous 120,000-acre tract of land (49,000 ha). The Irish-born Irvine met Collis Huntington, soon to become one of the Central Pacific Railroad (CPR) magnates, on a trip across the Atlantic. Rather than cementing a friendship, a disagreement that lasted throughout their lives resulted. When Huntington's Southern Pacific Railroad (SP) needed Irvine's land for its route between Orange County and San Diego, Irvine refused. When SP crews began laying tracks on Irvine land without permission, ranch hands with shotguns confronted the crews. Eventually, Irvine gave the Atchison, Topeka & Santa Fe Railway permission to build on his ranch.

When Irvine died in 1886, trustees, left in control of the ranch until his son James II (b.1867) turned 25, tried to sell it at auction. When this auction was declared illegal, James II took over the reins of the ranch and accelerated efforts to increase its agricultural production. In 1894, he incorporated the land holdings as the Irvine Company. Between the late 1800s to the 1970s, the Irvine Company continued to also run cattle operations on the property, with "Bommer Canyon Cattle Camp" serving as its center. They also ran sheep. James Irvine remarked in 1867 that he and his men "rode about [the Irvine Ranch] a good deal, sometimes coming home in the evening after a thirty- or forty-mile ride pretty thoroughly tired out, but we had to do it in order to see much of the ranch and the flock." At the time, his Irvine Company had been purchasing further adjoining parcels of land, "[so] there [was] considerable riding to be done, if one [was] to see much of [the ranch]." After James Irvine's death, majority control of the company passed to the James Irvine Foundation.

In 1953, the National Scout Jamboree was held on Irvine Ranch land in the area of what is now Fashion Island Shopping Center. Jamboree Road, running from Newport Beach to Orange, was built to allow people to travel to the jamboree from nearby train stations. In 1961, the Irvine Company sold 990 acres to the University of California system for $1.00 to develop a new campus, which became the University of California, Irvine. The school was named in honor of the Irvine family, not the city of Irvine, which did not yet exist. Three years later, the company sold, at a discounted price, an additional 510 acres to the university. During the early 1960s, the university and company, together with architect William Pereira, designed the Irvine Ranch Master Plan for developing the surrounding area. The city of Irvine, officially incorporated in 1971, grew around the campus.

By the late 1970s, the Irvine Company had ceased its cattle business. The foundation needed to sell the company after the passage of the Tax Reform Act of 1969. In 1977, a group led by A. Alfred Taubman and including real estate developer Donald Bren bought the company from the Irvine Foundation. The Bommer Canyon area was sold to the City of Irvine between 1981 and 1982, purchased with grants obtained from the 1974 California Bond Act. By 1983, Bren was the majority owner of the Irvine Company. By 1996, he had purchased all outstanding shares and was sole owner.

== Operations ==
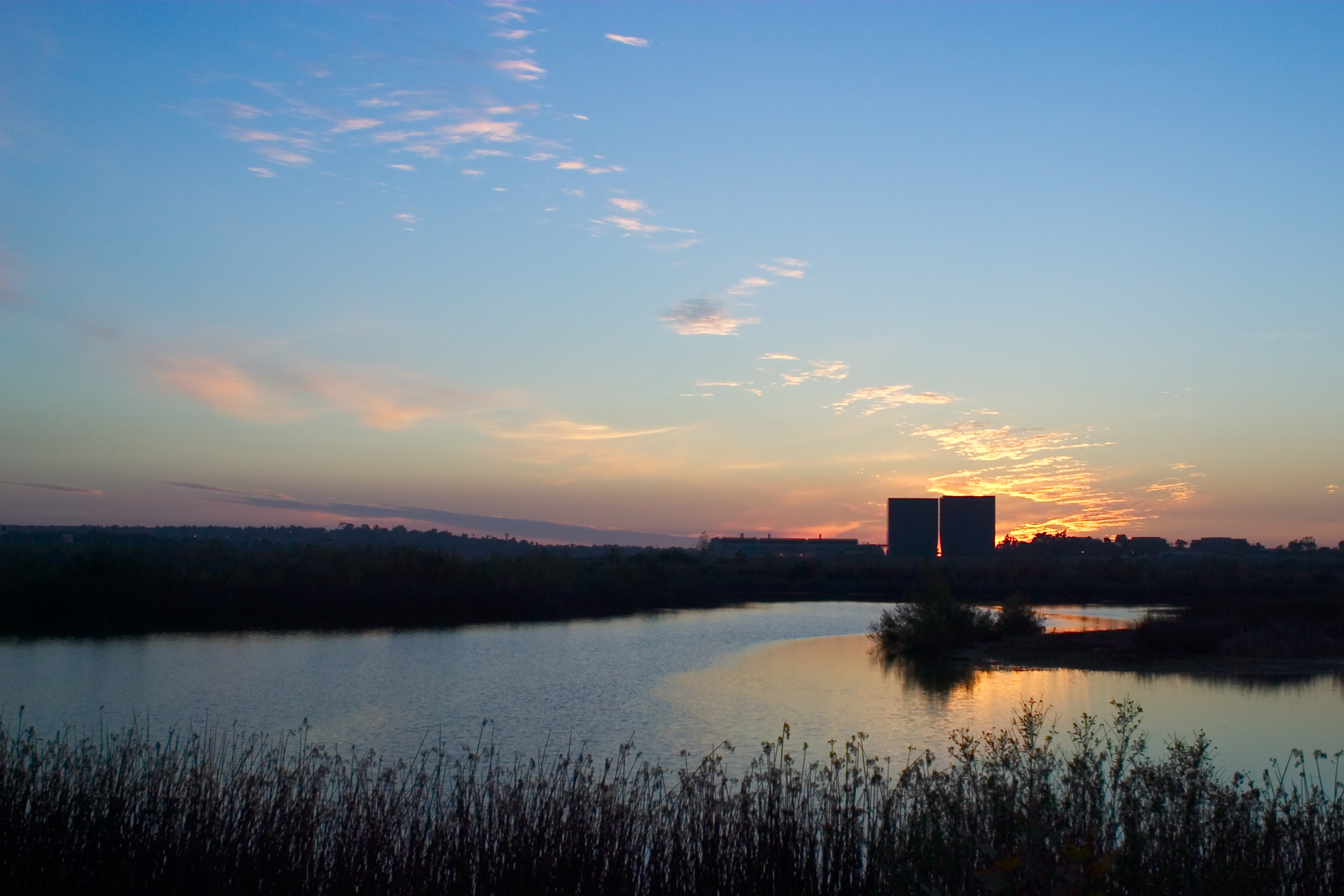
Wildlife habitat in the San Joaquin Wildlife Sanctuary, owned by the Irvine Ranch Water District and a part of the Irvine Ranch Natural Landmarks system

The Irvine Company develops suburban master-planned communities throughout central and southern Orange County, California and residential buildings in Santa Monica, Silicon Valley, and San Diego County. The company also owns and manages office buildings in Milpitas, San Jose, Sunnyvale, downtown San Diego, Mission Valley, San Diego, La Jolla Village/University City, Sorrento Mesa, Del Mar Heights, Newport Center, UCI locations, West Los Angeles, Pasadena, Chicago, and New York City.

The 93,000-acre (380 km^{2}) Irvine Ranch remains the core holding of The Irvine Company. It encompasses almost one fifth of Orange County, from the Pacific Ocean and Newport Harbor, Laguna Beach, and Santa Ana Canyon, to the boundary of the Cleveland National Forest. Of the total ranch area, 44,000 acres (180 km^{2}) is retained for development whilst the remainder - principally rugged canyons, wetlands, and water districts - are maintained as wilderness and recreational preserves collectively known as the Irvine Ranch Natural Landmarks.

In August 2014, the Irvine Company announced plans to donate and preserve 2,500 additional acres of land previously approved for housing.

In part because of its land preservation grants, in 2018 Irvine Company was named Business Philanthropist of the Year by the Greater Irvine Chamber of Commerce. The Chamber also cited gifts of more than $220 million to city schools and universities.

A partial list of cities within the boundaries of the Irvine Ranch includes:

- Irvine
- Laguna Beach
- Anaheim (Anaheim Hills)
- Tustin (Tustin Ranch)
- Orange
- Newport Beach

The Irvine Company owns several large retail centers, including The Market Place and Irvine Spectrum Center in Irvine, and Fashion Island in Newport Beach, which is surrounded by the Newport Center commercial area. The Irvine Company also holds several office properties, particularly in Irvine and Newport Center, the 20th Century Studios Plaza in Century City, Los Angeles, the MetLife Building in New York City, and nearly 550 total properties throughout Coastal California.

Among the company properties are apartment units in Santa Clara and San Jose, including ~800 in Santa Clara Square and ~800 and Monticello in Santa Clara; and ~500 in RiverView, 2,188 in North Park, and ~500 in Crescent Village in San Jose.

The company laid off 1,700 staff in 2020 as a result of the coronavirus pandemic, which mostly affected three hotels and resorts.

Irvine Company purchased Symphony Towers in San Diego for $134 million in 2003. They sold the 34-story office tower to Taiwanese company Formosa, Ltd. for $45.7 million, 70% less, in September 2024.

== Notable properties ==
Name	Image	City	Size (sq ft (m^{2}))	Purpose	Year built	Purchase date	Purchase price (USD)
MetLife Building		New York City	2,841,511 (263,985)	Office	1963	2005 (Note: The Irvine Company first acquired a stake in the MetLife Building in 2005 and grew its ownership thereafter, reaching 97.3% by 2015. The company acquired full ownership in a deal with Tishman Speyer in 2024.)	Undisclosed
71 South Wacker		Chicago	1,765,000 (164,000)	Office	2005	2010	$625,000,000
Fashion Island		Newport Beach, California	1,500,000 (139,355)	Retail	1967	N/A	N/A
One North Wacker		Chicago	1,400,000 (130,000)	Office	2002	2011	$620,000,000
300 North LaSalle		Chicago	1,300,000 (120,770)	Mixed-use	2009	2014	$850,000,000
Irvine Spectrum Center		Irvine, California	1,200,000 (111,484)	Retail	1995	N/A	N/A
2121 Avenue of the Stars		Los Angeles	969,990 (90,115)	Office	1987	2000	$350,000,000
200 and 400 Spectrum Center Drive		Irvine, California	852,900 (79,200)	Office	2017	N/A	N/A
One America Plaza		San Diego	623,001 (57,879)	Office	1991	2006	$300,000,000

== See also ==
- Old Town Irvine
