= Scott Johnson (architect) =

American architect (born 1951)

- Born: February 1, 1951 (age 75); Spreckels, California, U.S.
- Education: Stanford University; University of California, Berkeley (B.A., Architecture); Harvard University (M.A., Architecture)
- Occupation: Architect
- Practice: Johnson Fain

Scott Johnson (born February 1, 1951) is an American architect. He is the co-founder and Design Partner of Johnson Fain, an international architecture, planning and interior design firm located in Los Angeles.

== Education and career ==
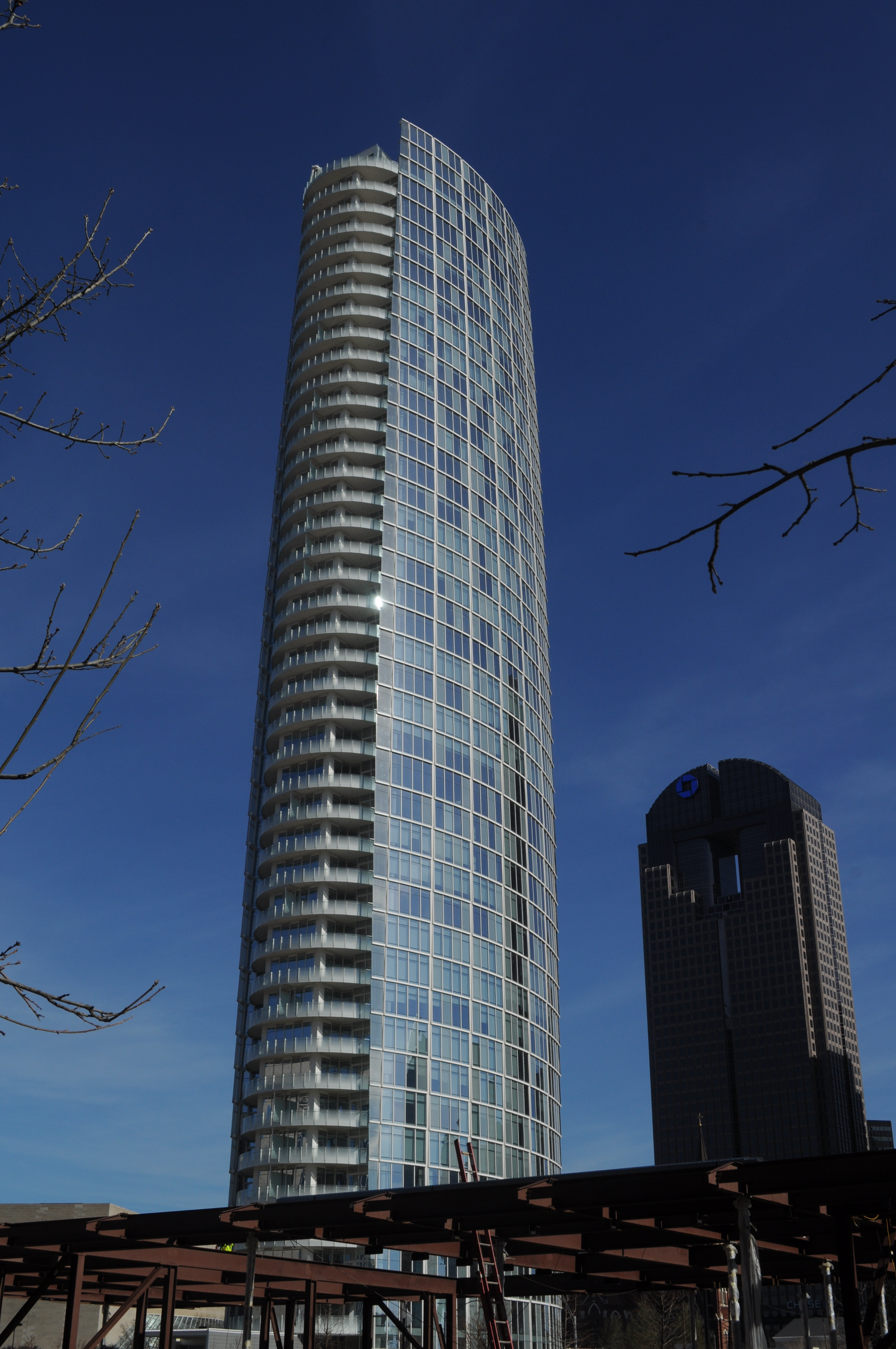
Museum Tower (Dallas), Dallas, completed January 2013

Johnson studied at Stanford University, the University of California, Berkeley, and the Harvard Graduate School of Design. He has lectured and taught at the Southern California Institute of Architecture (SCI-Arc), the University of California, Los Angeles (UCLA) and Berkeley (UCB), and the University of Southern California (USC), where he served as the Director of the Master of Architecture Programs from 2003-2006.

Johnson has worked at The Architects' Collaborative (TAC) in Cambridge, Massachusetts, Skidmore, Owings & Merrill (SOM) in Los Angeles and San Francisco, and Johnson Burgee in New York City. In 1983, he relocated to Los Angeles where he became Design Director and Principal at Pereira Associates. In 1989, Johnson assumed control of the office with his former Harvard classmate, William H. Fain, Jr., and renamed and rebuilt the firm as Johnson Fain.

Johnson and his firm have been the recipient of many awards for design excellence and have designed projects ranging from the First Americans Museum in Oklahoma City, Museum Tower in Dallas, the 2018 renovation of Christ Cathedral in Garden Grove, California, the Capital Area East End Complex at California's State Capitol, and 2121 Avenue of the Stars in Los Angeles, made famous as the fictional Nakatomi Plaza in the 1988 action film Die Hard. The work is also well-known abroad where the firm has completed projects throughout the Asian Pacific Rim.

He has authored a number of books including The Big Idea, Criticality and Practice in Contemporary Architecture, Tectonics of Place: The Architecture of Johnson Fain, a series of 3 books on the design of tall buildings, and Uncommon Ground: Notes on the Visual Arts + Architecture. With his partner, he has been a recipient of the Los Angeles Area Chamber of Commerce Lifetime Achievement Award and the American Institute of Architects/Los Angeles Chapter Gold Medal.
