= Warren Theatres =

Defunct American movie company

- Company type: Subsidiary/In-name-only unit of Regal Entertainment Group
- Industry: Motion picture theaters Warren Theatres
- Founder: Bill Warren
- Fate: Consolidated into Regal Entertainment Group
- Headquarters: Wichita, Kansas
- Number of locations: 6
- Areas served: Kansas; Oklahoma; Missouri
- Owner: Regal Entertainment Group

Warren Theatres is a movie theater brand based in Wichita, Kansas, United States. While the company was founded by Bill Warren, he sold ownership of most of the Warren Theatres locations to Regal Entertainment Group in 2017. The sale excluded two theaters that were in development and the Palace Theatre in Springfield, Missouri (the location is now closed).

As of January 2026, the remaining Warren locations still bear the brand name.

== Overview ==
As of December 2010, the Warren Theatres owned and operated eight theatre complexes in three states. Warren Theatres operated five theatres named the Warren Theatres, with three in Wichita, Kansas, one in Moore, Oklahoma, and one in Broken Arrow, Oklahoma. Warren Theatres also operated one theatre, named the Palace Theatre, a second-run location. Warren Theatres also operated a five-screen multiplex called the Movie Machine that was located in Towne West Square mall, which was taken over by Boulevard Theatres and reopened in 2022.

Warren Theatres' IMAX was at one point the top grossing IMAX in North America.

The Warren Theatres location in Old Town Wichita was a main venue for the Tallgrass Film Festival, an international, independent film festival. This location was closed in 2023 during bankruptcy proceedings of Regal's parent company, Cineworld, after a revised lease agreement could not be reached with the property owner for Regal Warren Old Town. At the end of September 2024, Boulevard Theatres announced that it had purchased the Old Town theatre, and it began to welcome guests on December 20.

In April 2018, Regal announced the closure of the Palace West location in Wichita. The final day of screenings occurred on April 8. The Movie Machine was closed in November 2020. In July 2021, Regal would reach agreement with property owner Arvest Bank to reopen the Midwest City location that Warren had closed in March 2020 because of the COVID-19 pandemic.

As of 2020, the website of Warren Theaters is inactive which means the company has fully absorbed into Regal Cinemas.

== Midwest City, Oklahoma ==
In February 2017, Bill Warren announced the return of the Warren Theatres name to a new 14-screen cineplex in Midwest City, Oklahoma. Originally slated for July 25, 2019, the theatre opened August 23 of that year. The theatre closed in March 2020 because of the COVID-19 pandemic and on September 5, 2020, the property was foreclosed. The theatre was offered at a sheriff's auction sale in January 2021, but a month later, Arvest Bank foreclosed on the theater following a $16.3 million lawsuit Arvest filed against MWC Warren Theatre, Inc. Property owner Arvest Bank contracted with Regal Entertainment to reopen the location which it did in July 2021.

== Locations ==
Name	Location	Established	Status	Screens	City, State
Warren	Palace West	1989	Closed	8	Wichita, Kansas
Regal Warren	21st Street Warren	1996	Open	18	Wichita, Kansas
Regal Warren	Old Town	2003	Closed	7	Wichita, Kansas
Regal Warren	13th Street Warren	2002	Open	20	Wichita, Kansas
Warren	Movie Machine	2002	Closed (New Ownership)	5	Wichita, Kansas
Regal Warren	Broken Arrow	2014	Open	18	Broken Arrow, Oklahoma
Regal Warren	Moore Warren	2008	Open	17	Moore, Oklahoma
Regal Warren	Midwest City	2019	Open	10	Midwest City, Oklahoma

== Features ==
Some of the screens at the West 21st street and East 13th street locations featured digital 3D projection, while the rest featured digital projections. Each auditorium of the Moore Warren was equipped with Dolby Digital Cinema, Dolby 3D, Dolby 7.1, and THX certified audio systems. Modeled after the classic art deco theaters in the 1950s, theatres included marble floors and counter-tops, neon lights, and hand-painted murals.

Some locations featured VIP balcony reserved seating, with food delivery from a private bar just outside the auditorium. Warren Theatres received national acclaim when Flaunt Magazine named the chain the top theater builder in the nation.

== Digital IMAX ==
The Warren's IMAX first opened in Wichita on December 17, 2010. The Moore Warren IMAX opened February 24, 2012. Both theaters have more than 585 seats, a dedicated lobby, 82 ft IMAX 3D screen, a family restroom, and an elevator.
