= Towne West Square =

Coordinates: 37°40′38″N 97°23′58″W

- Address: 4600 West Kellogg Drive; Wichita, Kansas 67209
- Opened: March 6, 1981
- Closed: June 30, 2025
- Developer: Melvin Simon & Associates
- Num. of stores: 37
- Num. of anchor tenants: 5 (2 open, 3 closed)
- Floor area: 951,447 sq ft (88,392.3 m^{2})
- Floors: 1 (2 in JCPenney)
- Parking: Parking lot
- Public transit: Wichita Transit

Towne West Square was an enclosed shopping mall located in Wichita, Kansas, United States. Opened on Friday, March 6, 1981, it comprised more than 50 stores in 951,447 square feet (88,392.3 m^{2}) of gross leasable area. The mall's two remaining anchor stores are Dillard's Clearance Center and JCPenney.

== History ==
The original anchor stores in the mall were: Dillard's, Henry's, JCPenney, Montgomery Ward and Service Merchandise (formerly Wilson's Catalog Showroom). Henry's closed in 1988. This area then housed an arcade and then was eventually closed off and made into a country dance hall. Sears opened in 1993, relocating from the Twin Lakes Shopping Center. Montgomery Ward closed on March 5, 2001, due to filing for bankruptcy, alongside the Wichita Mall store. Sears closed in December 2014. Their anchor store structure was taken over by Convergys and converted to office space, which was no longer accessible from the interior of the mall. In 2017, Dillard's closed their women's store anchor on the mall's north side and converted their men's store (located in the former Montgomery Ward) into a Dillard's Clearance Center. Sears Hometown, operated in the old Henry's, but closed in 2019. Later, Convergys was renamed Concentrix. In 2021, the former Concentrix space was purchased and is now MCI.

On July 31, 2020, JCPenney put 21 stores for sale as part of their bankruptcy, this location included. The store was reaffirmed in 2021 and remains open and operating.

In May 2022, the former Movie Machine movie theatre, which was operated by Warren Theatres, was reopened by a new Wichita-based movie theatre company, Boulevard Theatres.

Starting in 2023, the mall owner at that time, Kohan Retail Investment Group, began to not pay the property's utility bills in a timely manner, and temporary power disconnections by Evergy due to unpaid bills started to occur. Examples include the first threatened disconnection on June 20, and the first disconnection on September 8, 2023, and again on November 6, 2023. On April 10, 2024, the mall's water systems were temporarily shut off. The anchor stores at the time (JCPenney, Dillard's Clearance Center, and Dick's Sporting Goods), have separate accounts, including power and water, and has not been affected by any of the service disconnections.

On March 1, 2025, anchor Dick's Sporting Goods, one of the longest running tenants in the mall, closed. A few days later, on March 13, the mall was sold from Kohan Retail Investment Group to the Wichita Maple Company, LLC. with the Baughman Company as the representative. A zoning plan includes a modification to add "light industrial" to the property's current "commercial" zoning, in which the company cited allowing the "redevelopment of existing property."

On June 12, 2025, all remaining mall tenants were notified to vacate the mall property by June 30, 5 PM. The anchor stores (JCPenney, Dillard's) and Boulevard Theatres will remain open. A final tour of the mall was held on June 29. The tenants were given five additional days to remove their items from their properties after the closure on June 30. The mall will become a business park, with new businesses expected to open by the first quarter of 2026. Renovations began to take place on July 7, 2025.
