= Wichita Mall =

Shopping mall in Wichita, Kansas

Wichita Mall

Wichita Mall was an American shopping mall in Wichita, Kansas.

As of 2025, the mall now consists of office space and Wichita State University satellite centers.

== History ==
The malls original anchors were Montgomery Ward, Skagg's, and J.M. McDonald. It also had a movie theater.

The mall was constructed in February 1969. The Montgomery Ward store opened in the 1969 holiday season. The mall itself opened on July 30, 1970, as the Wichita Mall Shopping Center.

Montgomery Ward closed, alongside Wichita's Towne West Square location, on March 5, 2001, due to bankruptcy.

On August 8, 2002, the mall was sold.

In 2003, the mall was renovated drastically – including the former Montgomery Ward location – to include office space and a new Big Lots.
