= 2121 Avenue of the Stars =

Skyscraper in Los Angeles, California

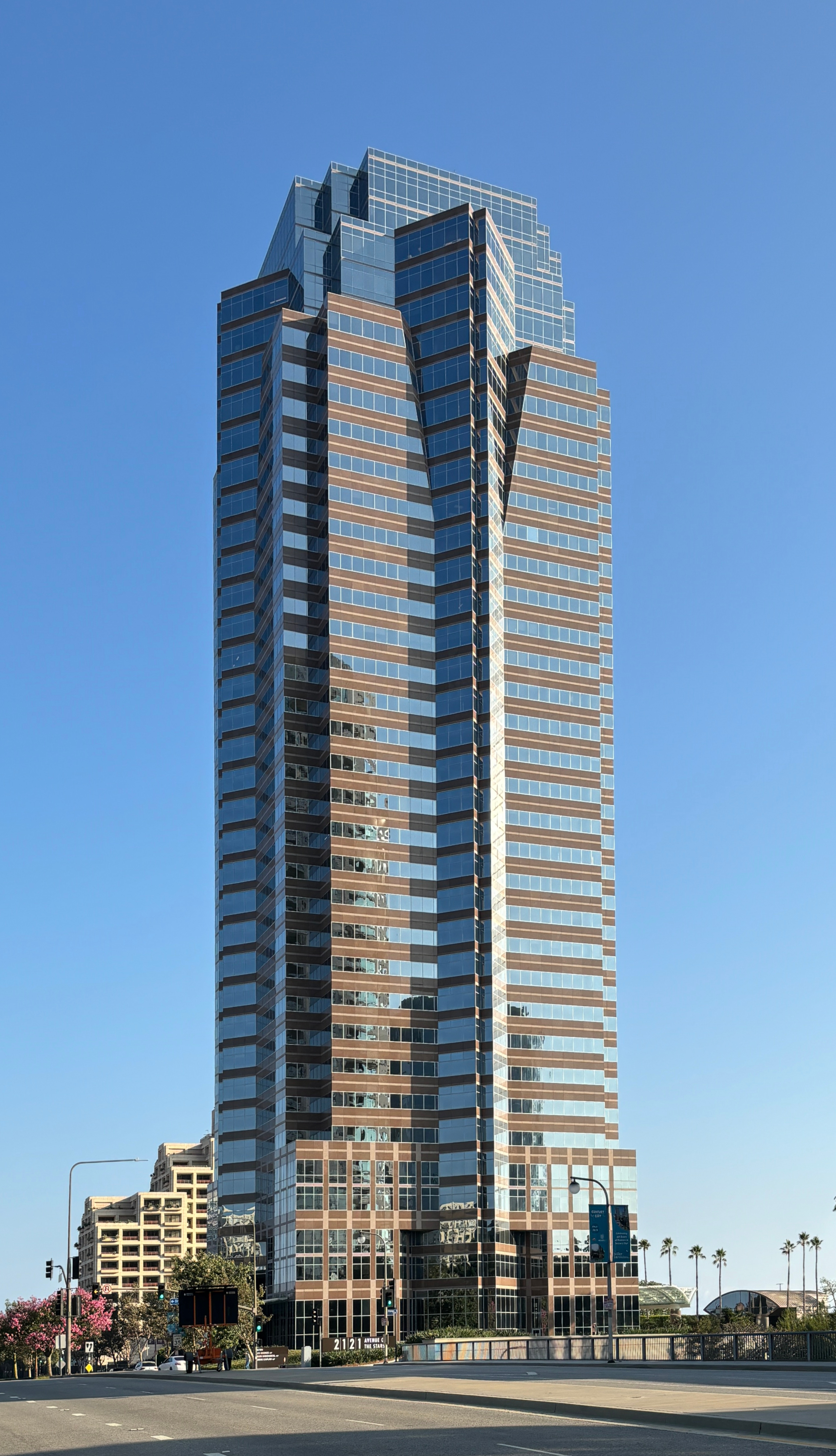
- September 2024
- Alternative names: 20th Century Studios Plaza

General information
- Type: Commercial offices
- Architectural style: Postmodern
- Location: 2121 Avenue of the Stars, Century City, California
- Coordinates: 34.055282°N 118.412804°W
- Current tenants: 20th Century Studios
- Construction started: 1985
- Completed: 1987
- Owner: Irvine Company LLC

Height
- Roof: 150 m (490 ft)

Technical details
- Floor count: 34
- Floor area: 90,115 m^{2} (969,990 sq ft)

Design and construction
- Architect: Scott Johnson
- Developer: Marvin Davis
- Structural engineer: John A. Martin & Associates
- Main contractor: Al Cohen Construction

2121 Avenue of the Stars, formerly known as Fox Plaza, is a 34-story, 493-foot (150 m) skyscraper in Century City, Los Angeles, California. It is owned by the Orange County–based Irvine Company.

== History ==
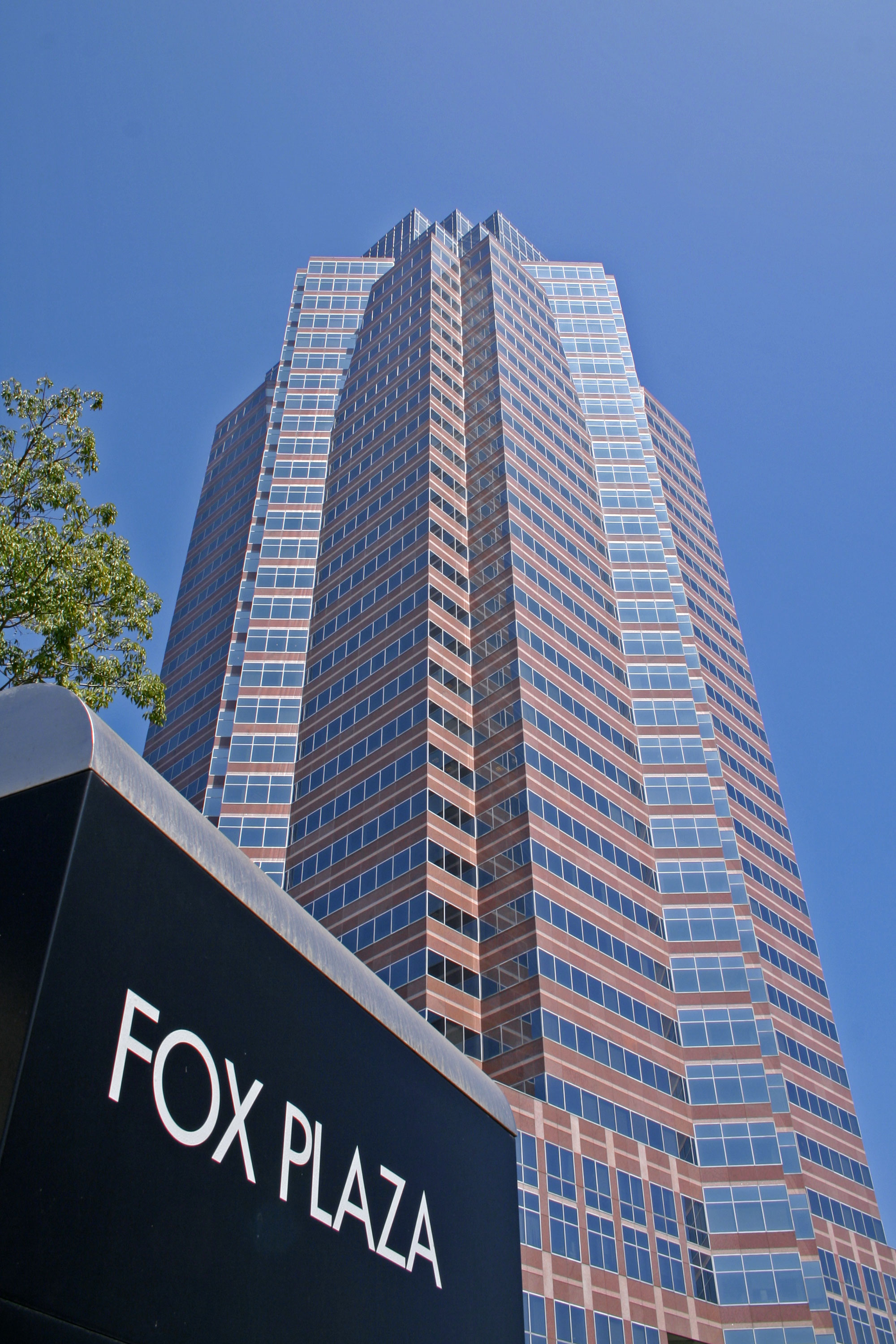
Fox Plaza in December 2005

Fox Plaza was developed by billionaire Marvin Davis, on land he had retained after selling the adjacent 20th Century Fox Studio to Rupert Murdoch in 1985. The tower was completed in 1987. Its principal design architect was Scott Johnson, Founding Design Partner of Johnson Fain.

Former President Ronald Reagan had his offices on the 34th floor of the building for several years after leaving public office.

In 1988, Davis sold his 50% stake in Fox Plaza to 20th Century Fox, which was one of the building's primary occupants. It resold it that same year to La Salle Partners for $320 million.

In 1997, Davis bought the building back from La Salle, for $253 million.

In 2000, Davis sold the building again, to billionaire Donald Bren's Irvine Company, for $350 million.

As of 2019, the 34th floor was occupied by 20th Century Studios.

In 2022, Chicago-based law firm Katten Muchin Rosenman LLP leased 46,000 sq ft (4,300 m^{2}) of office space in the property.

== Design ==
The outer exterior of the building contains rust-red granite and glass panels.

Fox Plaza features a unique HVAC system where a large vertical air shaft is located in the core of the building. The air shaft begins below the building as an outdoor, cooler air intake pushing air to each floor's fan room, and on the roof is located an exhaust for stale air. Such a system design uses the stack effect.

== Filming location ==
In a 2018 tour for Variety, the chief engineer of the building noted how the Fox Plaza has a large number of redundancies in its design, and he speculates that it is because it was intended to be used as a filming location.

The building has been featured in at least four major motion pictures released by Fox. Its most famous appearance was in the 1988 action film Die Hard, where while still under construction, it portrayed the fictional Nakatomi Plaza (also known as Nakatomi Tower), a building owned by a fictional Japanese keiretsu corporation. The damaged version of the tower was made via a scale-model special effect. In 2018, to celebrate the film's 30th anniversary, a screening was held outside with the building in the background. For the "80s Action Heroes" event, Call of Duty: Warzone added Nakatomi Plaza as a place of interest on the Verdansk '84 map. Following the conclusion of the event, the building remained, though any references to Die Hard were removed.

The plaza and a neighboring building are the main setting for the 1994 comedy Airheads, where fictional radio station KPPX is located. Fox Plaza was also one of the buildings brought down at the end of Fight Club. The building plays an important role in the Brooklyn Nine-Nine episode "99", in which detective Jake Peralta insists on visiting the building due to its role in Die Hard and causes his squad to miss their return flight to New York City.

The building can also be seen from the InterContinental Hotel pool across the street in the "Sunblock 5000" TV ad in Robocop 2 (1990).

The building as the Nakatomi Plaza from Die Hard appears in the 2024 film Deadpool & Wolverine, where it was pruned and sent to the Void by the Time Variance Authority and can be seen during the battle between Deadpool and Wolverine.

== See also ==
- List of tallest buildings in Los Angeles
