= Regal Cinemas =

Movie theater chain in the United States

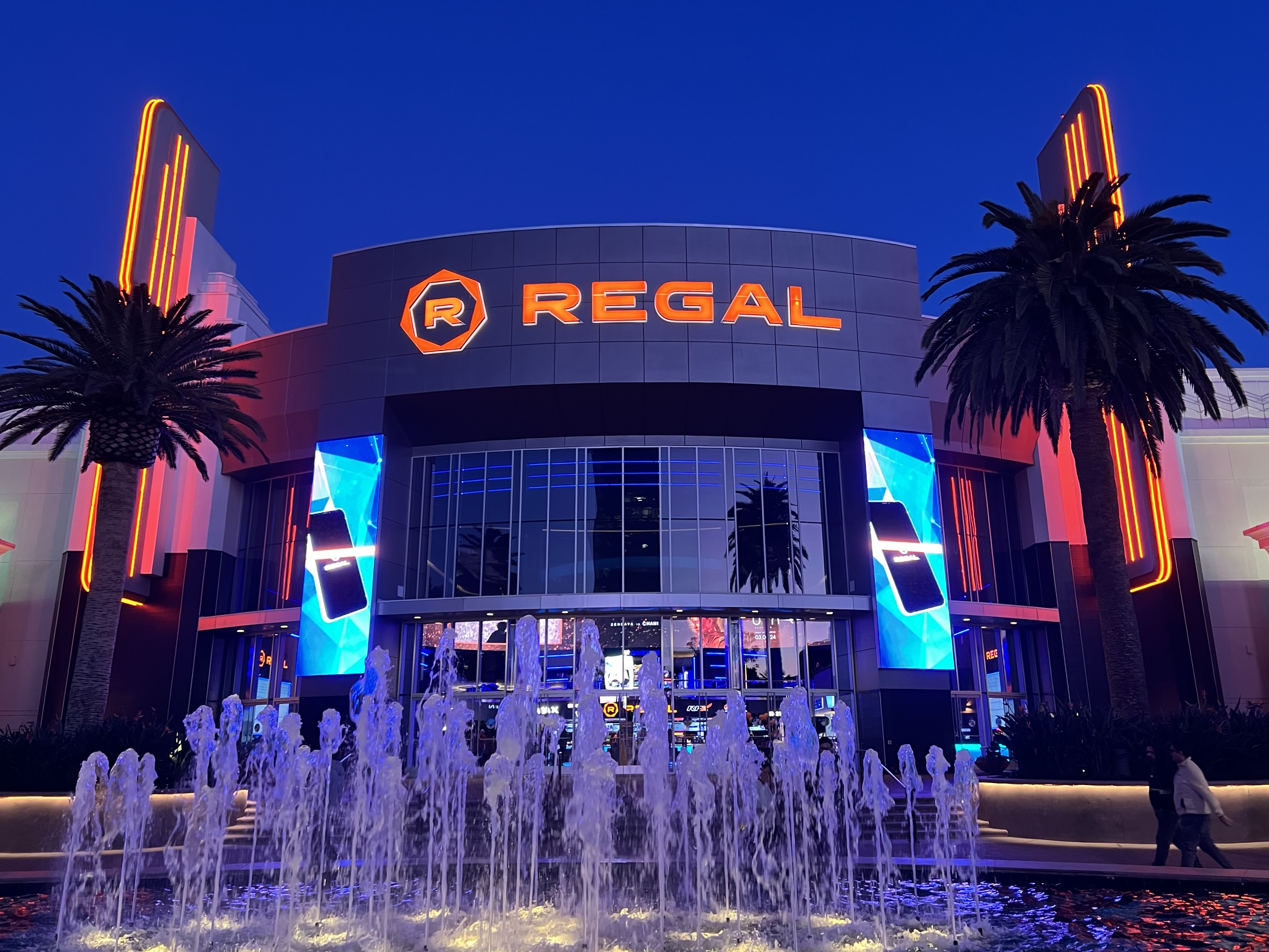
- Regal Cinemas at the Irvine Spectrum Center
- Formerly: Regal Cinemas, Inc. (1989–2002)
- Type: Subsidiary
- Traded as: Nasdaq: REGL (1993-1998); NYSE: RGC (2002-2018)
- Predecessors: Regal Cinemas (original); Edwards Theatres; United Artists Theatres
- Founded: August 10, 1989; 37 years ago (as Regal Cinemas); December 9, 2002; 23 years ago (as Regal Entertainment Group)
- Founders: Regal Cinemas: Mike Campbell; Edwards Theatres: William James Edwards Jr.; United Artists Theatres: Charlie Chaplin Mary Pickford
- Headquarters: Knoxville, Tennessee, U.S.
- Number of locations: 393 (November 2025)
- Key people: Eduardo Acuna (chairman and CEO)
- Revenue: ▲US$3,197.10 million (2016)
- Operating income: ▲US$339.40 million (2016)
- Net income: ▲US$170.40 million (2016)
- Total assets: ▲US$2,645.70 million (2016)
- Total equity: ▲US$839.10 million (2016)
- Number of employees: 26,047 (2018)
- Parent: Regal Global Entertainment
- Subsidiaries: Cinebarre; United Artists Theatres; Edwards Theatres; Warren Theatres; Great Escape Theatres; Hollywood Theatres
- Website: regmovies.com

Regal Cinemas is an American movie theater chain that operates the second-largest theater circuit in the United States, with 5,370 screens in 393 theaters as of November 2025. Founded on August 10, 1989, it is headquartered in Knoxville, Tennessee. The three main theater brands operated by the business are Regal Cinemas, Edwards Theatres, and United Artists Theatres.

On December 5, 2017, it was announced that the British theater chain Cineworld would acquire Regal for $3.6 billion, making it the second largest global theater exhibitor behind AMC Theatres. On September 7, 2022, Cineworld filed for Chapter 11 bankruptcy. In October 2023, the company moved operations from the bankrupt Cineworld Group plc corporate entity to a newly created group named Cineworld Parent Limited (later renamed Regal Global Entertainment).

== History ==
=== 1989–2002: Three separate chains ===
==== Regal Cinemas ====
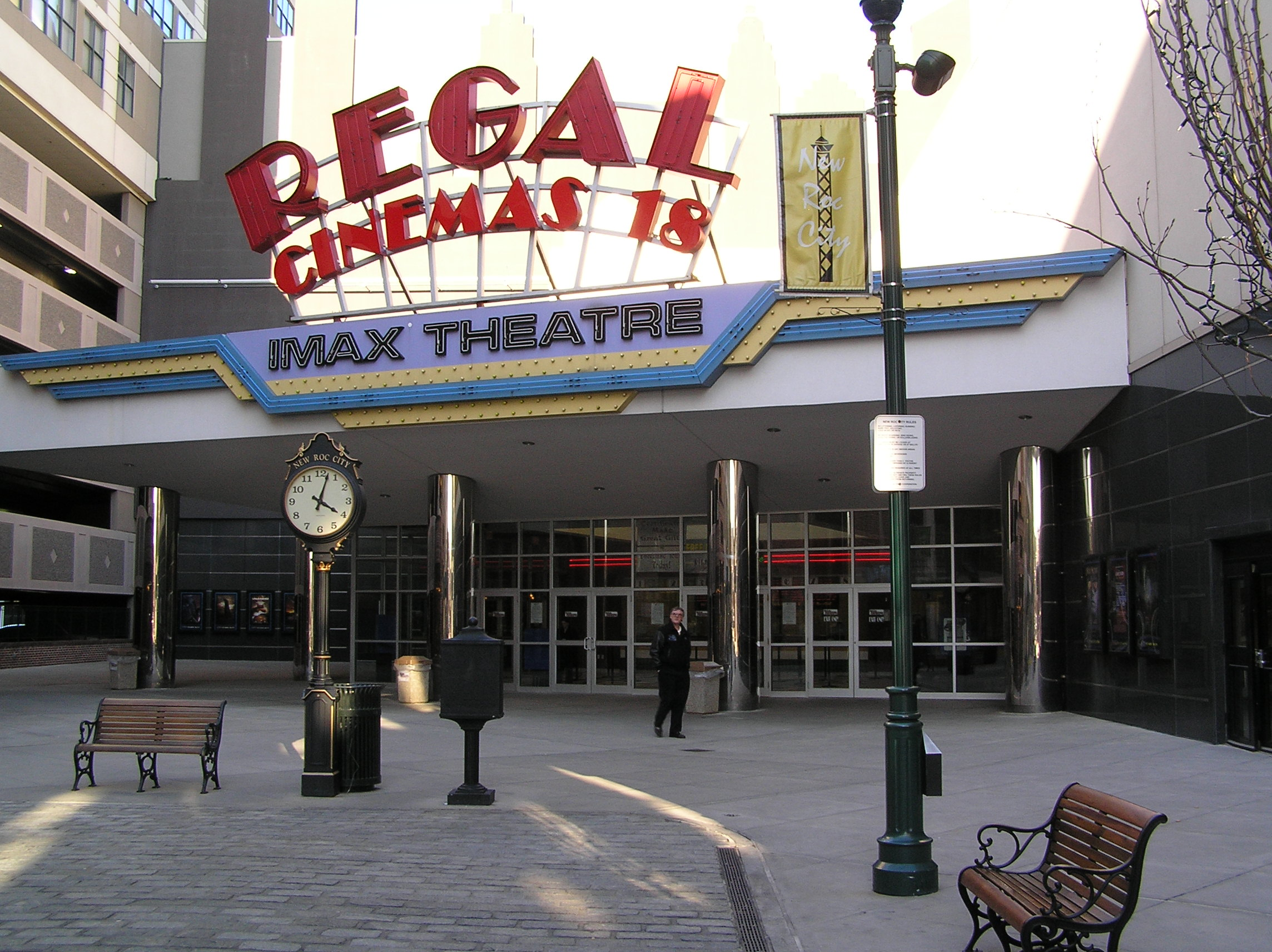
A Regal Cinemas (with a built-in IMAX theater) in New Rochelle, New York, a suburb of New York City

Regal Cinemas was established in 1989 in Knoxville, Tennessee, with Mike Campbell as CEO. Its first location was the Searstown Cinema in Titusville, Florida. Regal began to grow at a rapid pace, opening larger cinemas in suburban areas. Many of these contained a "premium" café (later called Cafe Del Moro) and a more upscale look than typical theaters of the time.

Regal Cinemas embarked on a large-scale expansion throughout the decade, acquiring smaller chains as well as building new, more modern multiplexes. Its largest acquisition during this original period was the 1998 combination of Regal Cinemas and Act III Theatres, following the purchase of both chains by Kohlberg Kravis Roberts, although Regal had also acquired some smaller chains in the mid-1990s, including the original Cobb Theatres, RC Theatres, and Cleveland-based National Theatre Corp.

By 2001, Regal was over-extended, and went into Chapter 11 bankruptcy. It became the namesake for the theater chain in which it would be merged into with the Edwards and United Artists theaters.

The chain's famous "Regal Roller Coaster" policy trailer, animated by SmithGroup Communications, which was shown before every movie shown from the early 1990s to the spring of 2005, was revived in 2010 and the current version was made in 2015, which was animated by The Tombras Group.

==== United Artists Theatres ====
United Artists Theatres (established in 1924) has its roots in the movie studio of the same name founded by Douglas Fairbanks, Mary Pickford, Charlie Chaplin, and D. W. Griffith, but legally has always been separate from it. Joseph Schenck was brought in to become UA's president in 1924; as part of the deal, Schenck entered into a partnership with Chaplin and Pickford to buy and construct theaters using UA's name. Over time, the chain became separate from the studio and by the 1970s was part of a larger company, United Artists Communications.

United Artists Theatres was purchased in the late 1940s by the Naify Brothers, who owned theatres in the San Francisco Bay Area. Their company up to this time was called Golden State Theatres. About this time they also acquired the San Francisco Theatres owned by Samuel H Levin. These theatres were the Balboa, Alexandria, Coliseum, Vogue, Metro, the Harding, and Coronet, which was opened in 1949. In 1977, the company formed a film division, United Film Distribution Company, to release The Kentucky Fried Movie, it merged with Artists Entertainment Group to form Taurus Entertainment Company in 1988. On April 22, 1988, UA bought the Philadelphia-based Sameric chain of about 30 locations in Pennsylvania, New Jersey, and Delaware. The UA Theatres main office was in San Francisco until December 1986, when it relocated to Englewood, Colorado.

UA was an early pioneer in cable television, and aggressively bought smaller regional systems. In December 1986, John C. Malone's Tele-Communications, Inc. became the majority owner; on June 8, 1991, it purchased the remainder of the company. Then on February 19, 1992, TCI sold the theatre chain in a leveraged buyout led by Merrill Lynch Capital Partners Inc and UA management.

==== Edwards Theatres ====
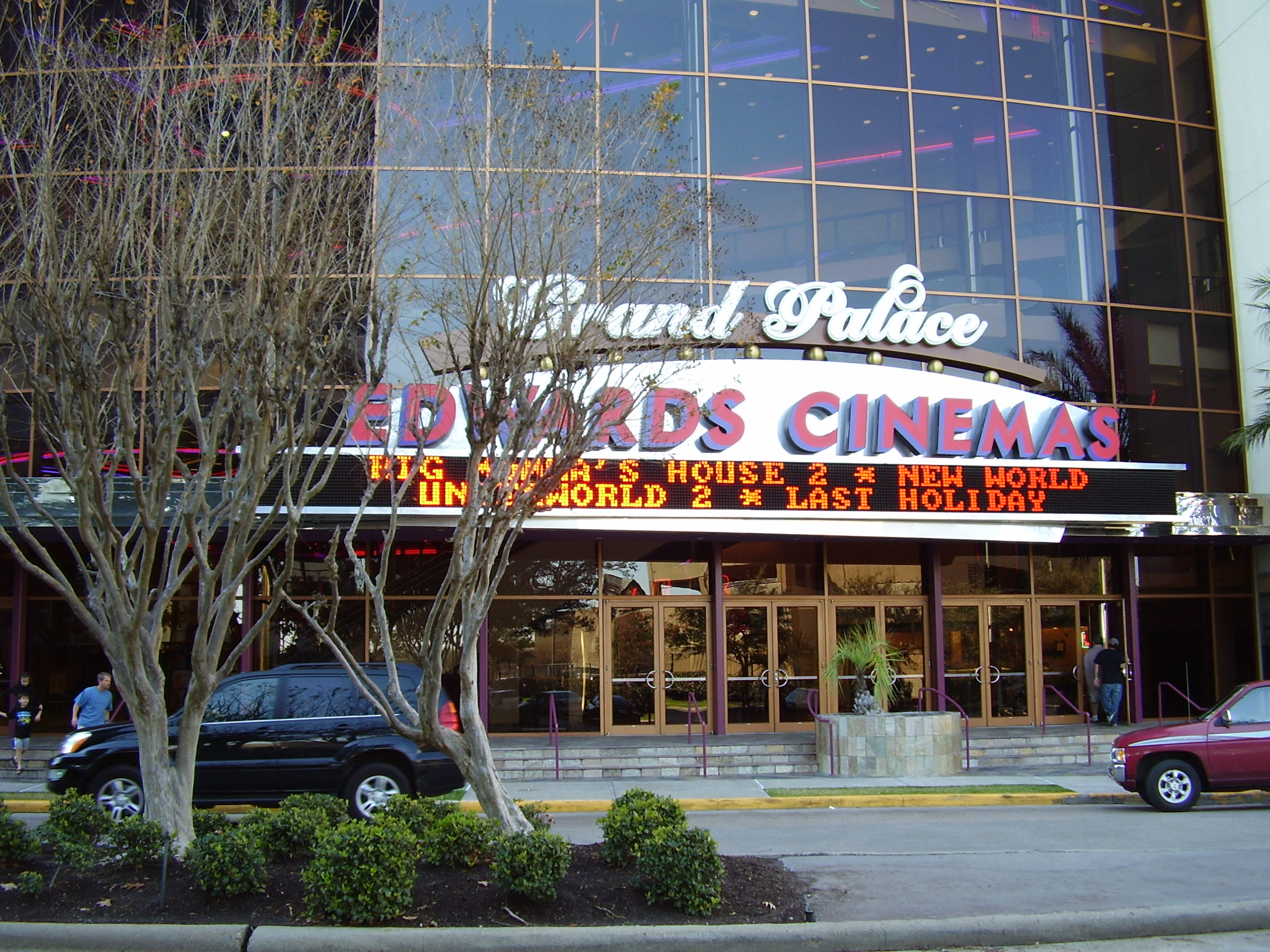
The Edwards Theatres Grand Palace 24 in Houston

Edwards Theatres was a family-owned chain in California, started in 1930 by William James Edwards Jr. It became one of California's best-known and most popular theater chains, and by Edwards' death in 1997, operated about 90 locations with 560 screens. Edwards Theatres had its headquarters in Newport Beach, California. His son, W. James Edwards III, became president and announced an ambitious expansion plan that would nearly double the company's screen count. The expansion plan gave Edwards a crushing debt load, and in 2000 it filed for bankruptcy.

=== 2002–2017: Anschutz consolidation ===
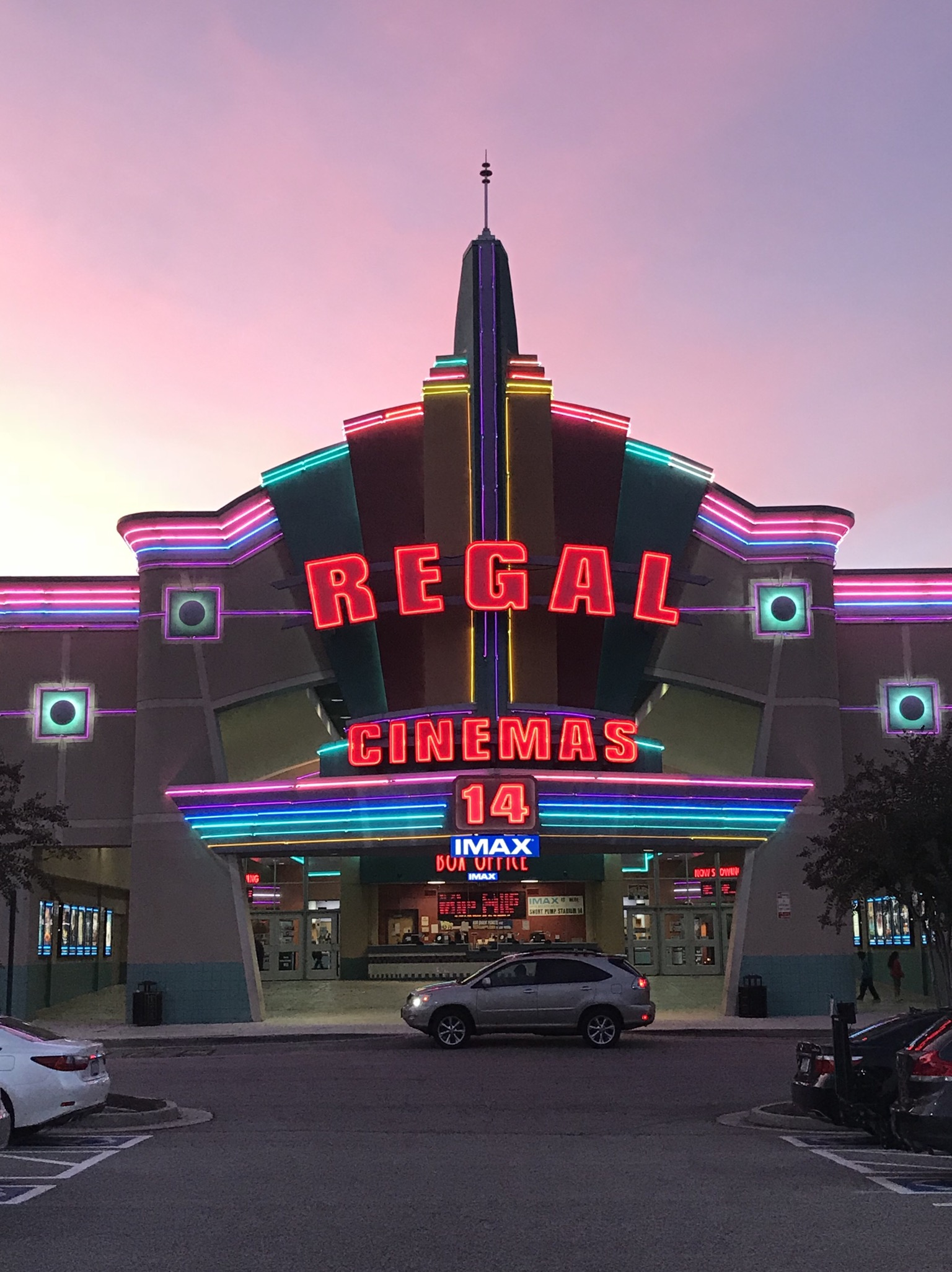
The Regal Cinemas 14 in Short Pump, Virginia

When all three chains went into bankruptcy, investor Philip Anschutz bought substantial investments in all three companies, becoming majority owner. In 2002, Anschutz consolidated his three theatre holdings under a new parent company, Regal Entertainment Group. Regal's Mike Campbell and UA's Kurt Hall were named co-CEOs, with Campbell overseeing the theatre operations from Regal Cinemas' headquarters in Knoxville, and Kurt Hall heading up a new subsidiary, Regal CineMedia, from the UA offices in Centennial, Colorado. The Edwards corporate offices were closed.

Regal and United Artists had attempted to merge before in 1998, using a similar method. Investment firms Kohlberg Kravis Roberts and Hicks, Muse, Tate & Furst announced plans to acquire Regal, then merge it with UA (which would be bought by Hicks, Muse) and Act III (controlled by KKR), with the new company using the Regal Cinemas name. UA eventually dropped out of the merger, but the merger between Regal and Act III went through.

As Regal consolidated the three chains, CineMedia began work on a new digital distribution system to provide a new "preshow", replacing the slides and film advertisements with digital content. NBC and Turner Broadcasting were among the first to sign on to provide content for the venture, and the preshow, dubbed "The 2wenty", debuted in February 2003; this pre-film preshow is now known as "Regal FirstLook". The new distribution system was also meant to be used for special events such as concerts. Regal CineMedia merged with AMC Theatres' National Cinema Network in 2005 to form National CineMedia. In effect, this was a takeover of NCN by Regal CineMedia, as Kurt Hall stayed on as CEO and AMC adopted Regal's preshow. Regal owned 50% of the new company before it went public.

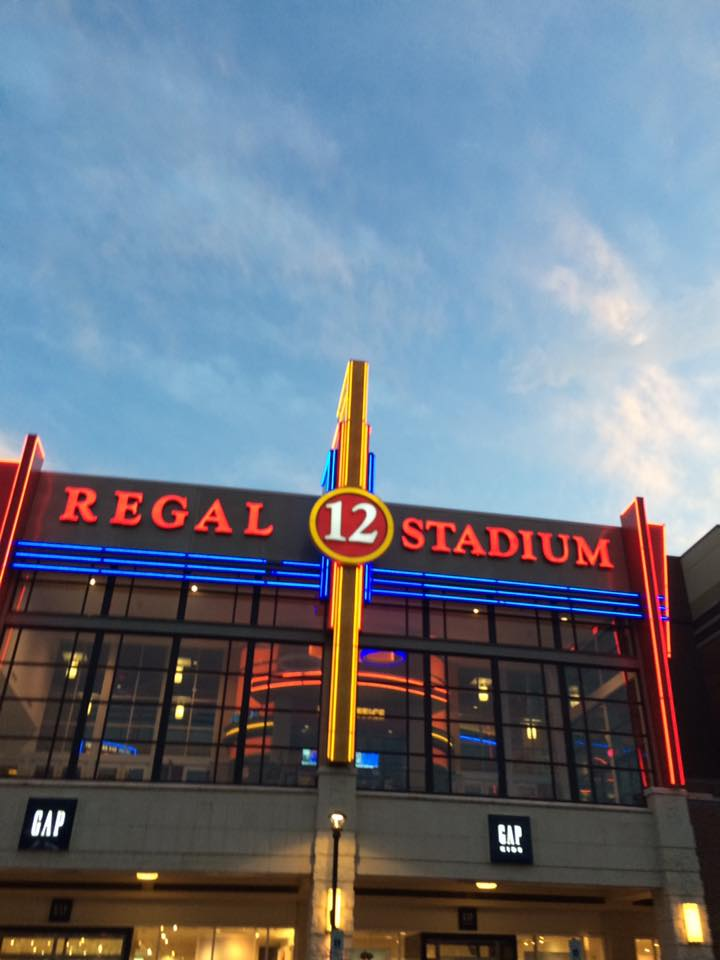
The Regal Cinemas at the Nanuet Town Centre shopping complex in Nanuet, New York

Since the 2002 formation of REG, it has acquired several smaller chains. It took over the US assets of Hoyts Cinemas in March 2003 and announced the acquisition of San Ramon, California–based Signature Theatres in April 2004. Unlike the merger with UA and Edwards, Regal has rebranded all of these theatres as Regal Cinemas. In April 2005, Eastern Federal, which was a theatre company in the Southeastern United States, was acquired by Regal. In February 2013, Regal agreed to purchase Hollywood Theaters, a nationwide chain of 46 theaters that operated from Portland, Oregon. The sale was closed on April 1, 2013. In May 2017, Regal purchased the $200 million company Warren Theaters based in Wichita, Kansas. The sale included all Warren Theater locations in Wichita KS as well as those in Moore and Broken Arrow OK. The theaters will continue operation under the Warren name.

In 2007, REG opened its first all-digital projection theater in Henderson, Nevada (a suburb of Las Vegas), the Fiesta Henderson Stadium 12. Regal sold Fandango to the leading cable company Comcast Corporation in 2007.

Regal Entertainment Group completed its acquisition of Consolidated Theatres on May 1, 2008. In the transaction, Regal acquired Consolidated's 28 theaters and 400 screens for $210 million. Consolidated's concentrations of theatres in the Mid-Atlantic states of Maryland, Virginia, Tennessee, Georgia and North and South Carolina overlapped in some places with Regal's. As a condition of approval of the merger, the United States Department of Justice required that Regal divest itself of several theaters in areas where it would have a monopoly. Regal agreed to sell off four theaters in the Asheville, Charlotte and Raleigh, North Carolina markets, but a large number of theaters still remains in all three markets.

On May 17, 2009, Regal collaborated with Sony Corporation to equip all of its theaters with Sony 4K digital projection over the next three to five years.

In April 2010, Regal launched Regal Premium Experience (RPX), a new upgraded theater format. Both digital 2D and RealD 3D films can be screened. As of January 2016, there are 87 operating RPX locations.

In June 2011, after posting a loss for the first quarter, Regal began downsizing its theater workforce by removing managers from projection and replacing them with lower-paid floor staff. This move allowed Regal to lay off part-time managers across the country and forcibly demote many full-time managers to part-time. As theaters converted to all digital automated screens, Regal also removed projectionists altogether. This focus on "cost control" helped the company post better than expected profits for the 3rd quarter of that year.

In March 2014, AEG and Regal collaborated an agreement to add 4DX—a 4D film format—to its location at L.A. Live. As of 2018, it operated six 4DX screens nationwide, with plans to expand to at least 79.

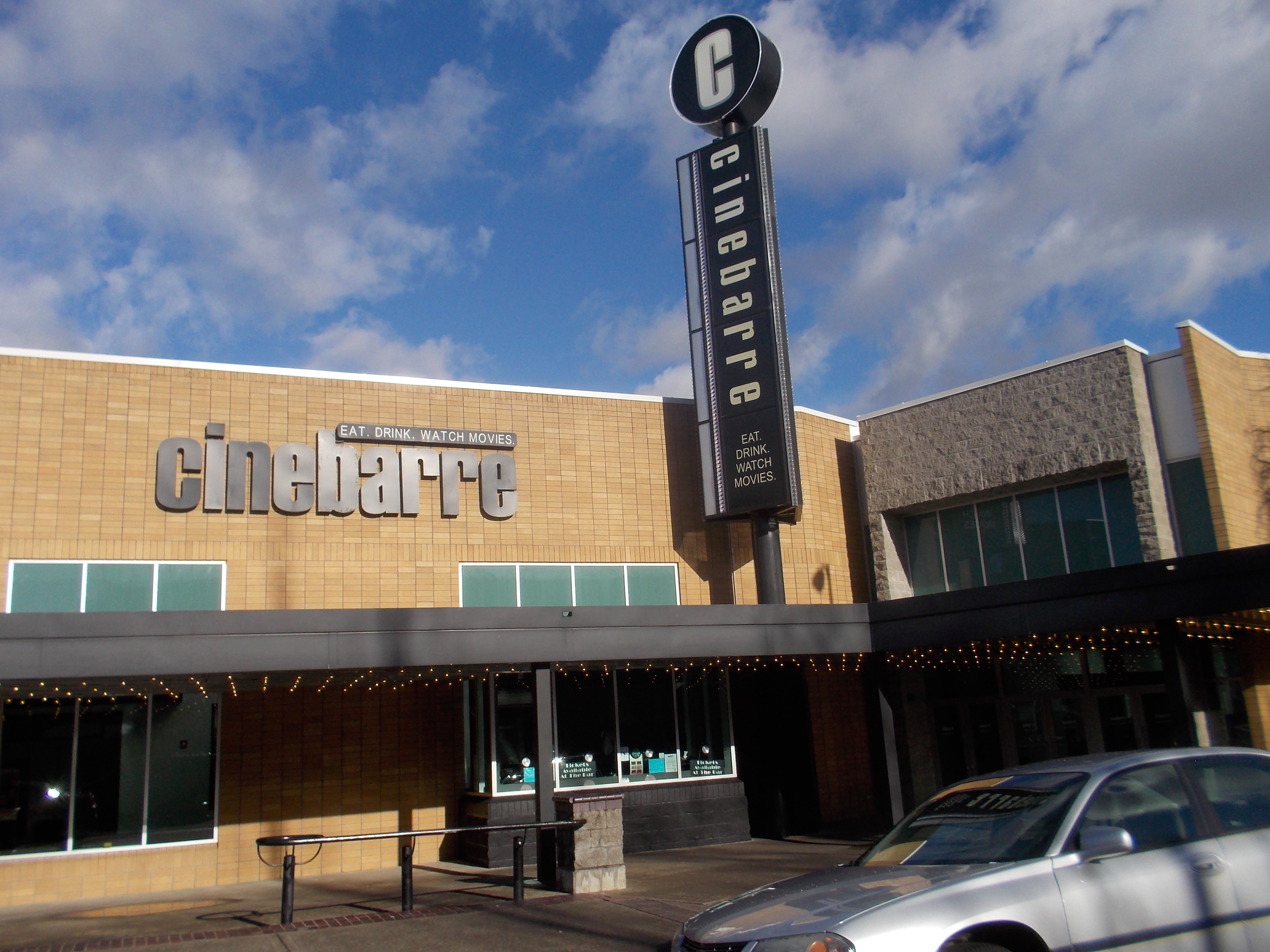
A Cinebarre, a subsidiary of Regal Cinemas, in Salem, Oregon

In December 2015, Regal took over managing operations of Cinebarre, a former joint venture between Regal Entertainment Group and Terrell Braly. These locations feature a full bar and made-from-scratch restaurant menu, allowing patrons to order before/during a movie and have the food delivered directly to their seats. As of August 2024, there are four Cinebarre locations operating within the United States.

In January 2016, Regal was issued a temporary injunction by a district court in the state of Texas following complaints by the Houston-based theater chain iPic Entertainment, which found that Regal had colluded with 20th Century Fox, Sony, and Universal by threatening boycotts of their releases if they did not refuse clearance of their films to smaller cinema chain locations (such as iPic).

In 2017, Regal purchased Wichita, Kansas–based Warren Theatres.

=== 2018–present: Acquisition by Cineworld ===
In November 2017, Regal began merger talks with the UK theater chain Cineworld. On December 5, it was officially announced that Cineworld would buy Regal for $3.6 billion, forming the world's second-largest cinema group.

Regal adopted a new logo in October 2018, featuring an emblem resembling a camera aperture and a crown. In recognition of the company's Knoxville heritage, Regal adopted orange as a corporate color in reference to the Tennessee Volunteers.

In July 2019, Regal announced a new movie ticket subscription service known as Regal Unlimited. This service allows users to see an unlimited number of movies and receive a 10% discount on concessions, although there is an additional surcharge for premium movie formats. The service is modeled upon a similar program employed by Cineworld.

On January 7, 2020, in alignment with existing agreements with Cineworld, it was announced that PepsiCo would replace The Coca-Cola Company as the exclusive supplier of non-alcoholic beverages to all Regal cinemas, notably breaking a monopoly held by Coke among the top three theater chains in the United States, which also includes AMC Theatres and Cinemark Theatres. Pepsi also became the "exclusive sponsor" of Regal's 4DX screens.

==== COVID-19 pandemic ====
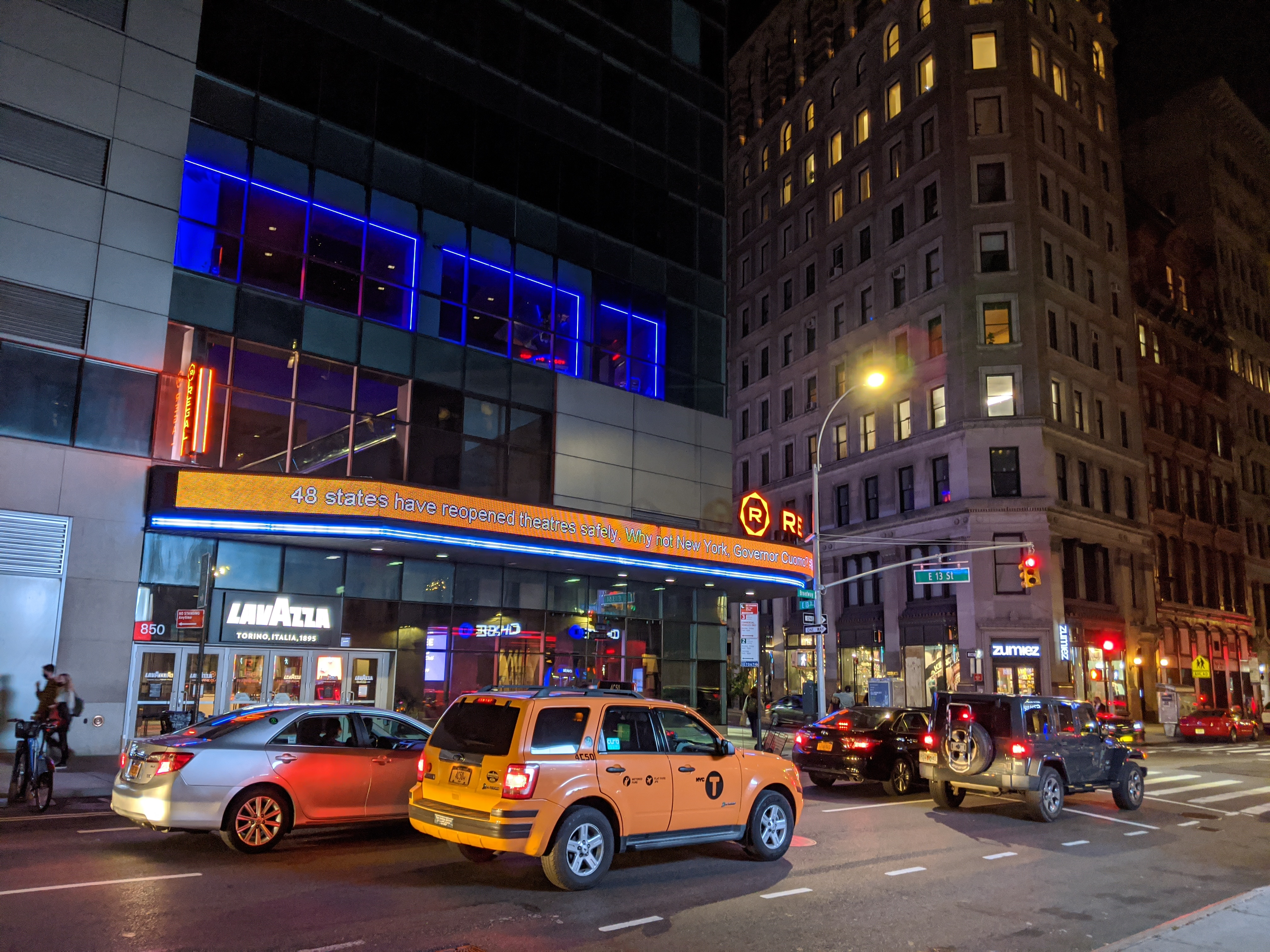
Regal's Union Square location in October 2020, displaying a message on its marquee protesting continued closures of cinemas in the state of New York; "48 states have reopened theatres safely. Why not New York, Governor Cuomo?"

On March 16, 2020, Regal Cinemas closed all 543 of its theaters in the United States indefinitely due to the COVID-19 pandemic, becoming the first theater chain in the United States to close all its theater locations as a result of the pandemic. Regal Cinemas started reopening most of its theaters on August 21, 2020, with a few delayed until August 28 and others closed indefinitely due to local restrictions or having already been planned to close prior to the pandemic.

On October 5, 2020, Cineworld announced it would close most Regal, all Cineworld, and Picturehouse Cinemas locations in the United States, United Kingdom, and Ireland indefinitely, beginning October 8. CEO Mooky Greidinger specifically cited that the continued reluctance of New York to allow theaters to open was the main factor, as well as the lack of tentpole Hollywood films due to the high cost of operating a theater without new releases (describing the delay of the final James Bond film No Time to Die from November to April 2021 as being the "last straw"). Mooky argued that the studios were holding off on new releases until New York theaters reopen (accusing Governor Andrew Cuomo of being inflexible, despite having allowed other forms of indoor businesses to resume operations), and that the company only planned to reopen its cinemas once it is confident there is a "clear" and "solid" lineup of new releases.

The closures initially excluded seven recently opened locations in California, and 11 New York state locations (after it began to allow cinemas outside of New York City to reopen on October 23 at 25% capacity if specific health metrics are met). However, on November 9, Regal announced that these locations would close until further notice effective November 12.

On March 23, 2021, Cineworld announced that in light of theaters in New York City and Los Angeles being given the go-ahead to reopen theaters earlier in the month, they would begin reopening select Regal locations on April 2, in time for the release of Godzilla vs. Kong, with the company aiming to have most Regal locations reopened by April 16, in time for the release of Mortal Kombat, which was pushed back a week to April 23. The wide reopening was pushed back to May 7, with all but 13 open by May 28. Cineworld reached agreements with Disney, Universal, and Warner Bros. to commit to theatrical windows.

On June 19, 2021, Regal Cinemas acquired the lease of the former Arclight Cinemas at the Sherman Oaks Galleria in Los Angeles, with plans for a $10 million remodel that would include premium large format, 4DX, IMAX, and ScreenX screens. In January 2023, however, it was announced that the theater would close on February 15 unless the lease was renegotiated, but it continued to operate after the date had passed. In May 2023, Regal announced that they had reached a new lease agreement with the galleria to continue operating the theater.

In April 2023, it was announced that Regal had acquired the lease to the former ArcLight theater at The Paseo in Pasadena, California. The location reopened as part of the Regal chain in June of that year.

==== Cineworld bankruptcy ====
In August 2022, the Wall Street Journal reported that Cineworld would file for bankruptcy after struggling to rebuild attendance and incurring debts of more than $4.8 billion amid the pandemic. Cineworld confirmed that Regal Cinemas would remain in operation while Cineworld would evaluate their financial strategies. On September 7, 2022, Cineworld announced that it had filed for Chapter 11 bankruptcy. Cineworld planned to emerge from Chapter 11 in the first quarter of 2023, and planned to pursue "a real estate optimisation strategy", including the closure or sale of theaters and other discussions with landlords on its cinema lease terms with Regal.

On September 28, 2022, The Wall Street Journal reported that Canadian exhibitor Cineplex was exploring the possibility of merging with Regal; Cineworld had attempted to acquire Cineplex in 2020, but was forced to pay US$1 billion in damages for breach of contract after backing out of the deal. Cineworld was denied an appeal by the Ontario Superior Court of Justice, which had ruled in favor of Cineplex in the associated legal dispute. In May 2023, Cineworld said that its emergence from Chapter 11 bankruptcy was expected to happen later that year. In October 2023, the company moved operations from the bankrupt Cineworld Group plc corporate entity to a newly created group named Cineworld Parent Limited (later renamed Regal Global Entertainment Limited).

== Premium theaters ==
- RealD 3D: A stereoscopic 3D format found at most Regal theatres.
- Regal Premium Experience (RPX): Regal's premium large format. Select RPX theaters utilize Dolby Atmos sound, ButtKicker rumble seats, and/or 4K HDR laser projection on a maximized screen.
- IMAX: Regal operates at 95 IMAX locations in the United States as of January 2026.
- 4DX: Designed by CGV's CJ 4DPLEX, 4DX utilizes motion-enhanced seats that sync with the film's actions, accompanied by environmental special effects such as wind, strobe lights, water, air blasts, leg ticklers, vibrations, rainstorm, smoke, and scent. It debuted its first theater at the L.A. Live theater in 2014 and has 58 theaters as of January 2026.
- ScreenX: A movie theater that presents films with two extra screens on walls for a 270-degree view. Designed by CJ CGV and has 53 theaters as of January 2026.

== See also ==
- AMC Theatres
- Cinemark Theatres
- List of movie theater chains
