= Irvine Spectrum Center =

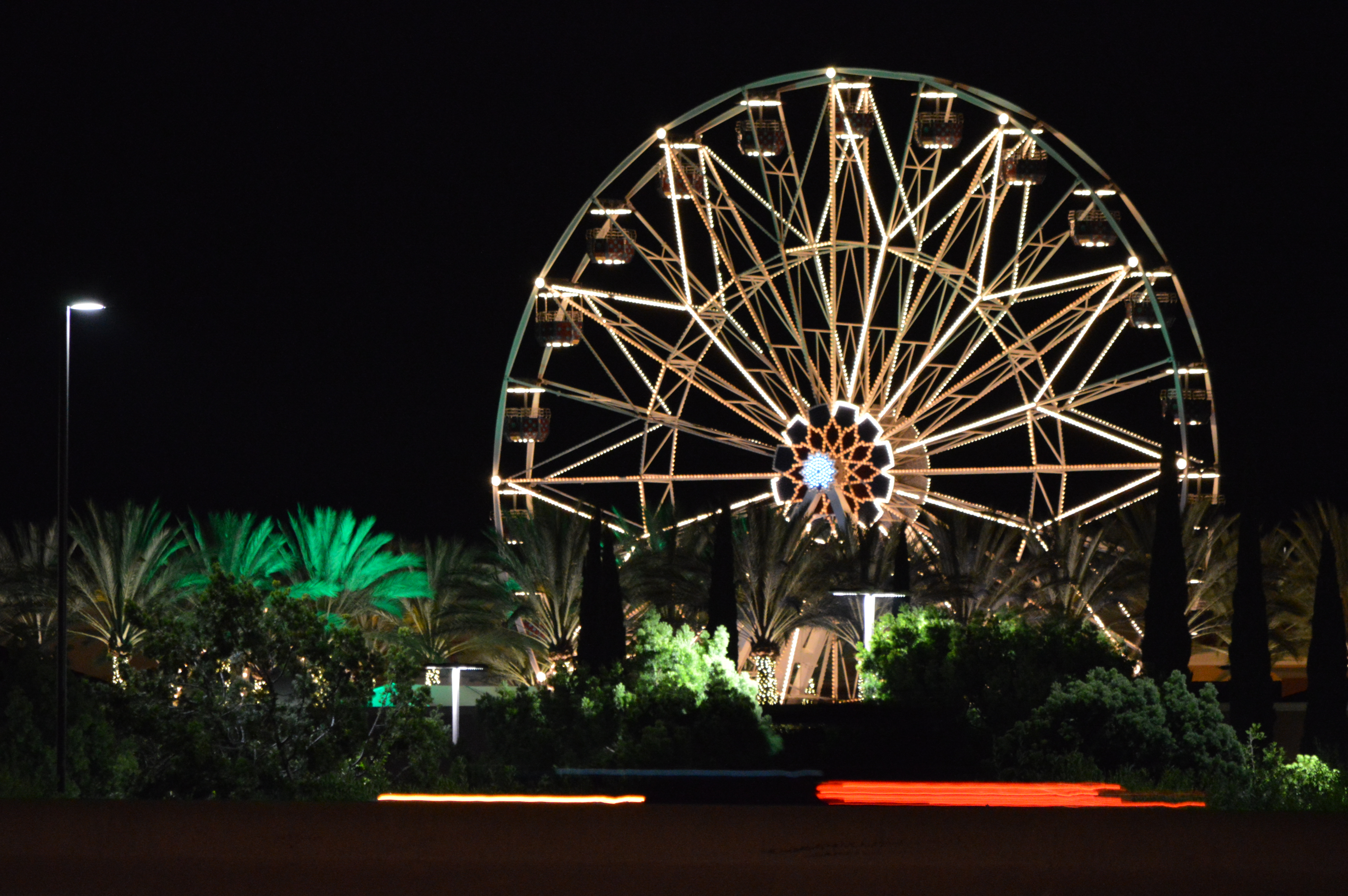
- The "Giant Wheel" at the Irvine Spectrum Center as seen from across I-5 in December 2013
- Location: Irvine, California, U.S.
- Coordinates: 33°39′01″N 117°44′37″W
- Opened: November 22, 1995; 30 years ago
- Developer: The Irvine Company
- Architect: Perkowitz & Ruth (Phase 1); RTKL Associates (Phase 2); B.A.R. Architects (Phase 3); Unknown Architect (Phases 4-6)
- Num. of stores: 152
- Num. of anchor tenants: 2
- Website: irvinespectrumcenter.com

The Irvine Spectrum Center is a lifestyle center developed by the Irvine Company, located in the Irvine Spectrum district on the southeast edge of Irvine, California, United States. The center features Nordstrom and Target department stores, a ferris wheel, and a Regal Cinemas 21-screen movie theater. Built over a 10-year period, the first phase of the center opened in 1995 and the second phase followed in 1998. The third phase was completed in 2002. The fourth and fifth phases were built and completed between 2005 and 2006.

== History ==
Planning of the development of the area began in 1985. In 1989, the Irvine Company completed two 15-story office towers at the site. The retail and entertainment portion of the development, then known as the "Entertainment Center at the Irvine Spectrum Center", began construction in 1993. This first phase of the center opened in 1995 and consisted of Edwards Cinemas' 21-screen multiplex, Oasis Food Court, and GameWorks. The second phase opened in 1998. The mall's carousel was added in 2001. In 2002, the mall's third phase opened, adding a "Giant Wheel" Ferris wheel, and the centers two anchor stores, Robinsons-May and Nordstrom. Robinsons-May was re-branded as Macy's in 2006 after it was bought by Macy's. Another expansion opened in 2006, adding Target as a third anchor. Smaller expansions have been added since, such as the Clock Court restaurants and a children's play area. In 2016, 200 Spectrum Center, an office tower on the northwestern edge of the property designed by Pei Cobb Freed & Partners, was completed. At 323 feet tall, 200 Spectrum Center is the tallest building in Orange County. Since 2003, a skating rink has been offered during the winter months, adjacent to the Giant Wheel. Macy's closed its Irvine Spectrum location in 2016.

=== Regal Cinemas ===
The Regal Cinemas originally opened as Edwards Cinema 21 and had a 21-screen movie theater that was once the largest movie theater in the western United States. During development, the Edwards company code-named it "The Big One". This remained the movie theater's nickname until other theaters eclipsed its screen count, particularly 30-screen AMC Theatres megaplex at The Outlets at Orange. The theater bore over two miles of pink and purple neon lights. On August 21, 2020, the movie theater reopened as Regal Cinemas with a new modern look.

=== Expansion ===
The Irvine Company announced in 2016 that the former Macy's building would be torn down and turned into 20 new stores, which were to open in 2018. The new stores have since opened in the southeastern section of the center, featuring a newly designed Apple Store, a two-story H&M, and 18 new stores and restaurants.

The Irvine Spectrum Center continued to expand a new wing on the south side of the center in 2020. The outdoor center added large stores, restaurants, and cafes such as Sephora, Blk Dot Coffee, Apple, and a new children's playground. This $200 million expansion has attracted new revenue for the mall.

=== Crimes ===
On July 23, 2025, social media influencer Juicy Jacob arrived at the shopping center and donned the attire of the Lorax. This incident resulted in the formation of a large crowd, prompting the dispatch of law enforcement authorities.

On October 24, 2025, Matt Sumida, another social media influencer, AuDHD self-activist, visited the mall for a video production. Similar to the previous incident, a substantial crowd gathered, necessitating the deployment of law enforcement personnel. Consequently, two individuals sustained minor injuries during the crowd's formation.

== Design ==
The architecture of the property is based on Moroccan, Andalusi and Moorish architecture, figuring most prominently in the center's second phase, which is based on the design of the Alhambra in Granada, Spain.

The center is car dependent, with the center itself surrounded by at least 2,300 parking spaces.

A white obelisk, which at night features the word "SPECTRUM" vertically projected onto it, is located on the northern corner near the freeway. It contains a cell phone and television tower.

== In popular culture ==
The center was used for establishing shots of the fictional "Mall of Miami" in the Disney Channel television series Austin & Ally.
