= One North Wacker =

Office skyscraper in Chicago, Illinois

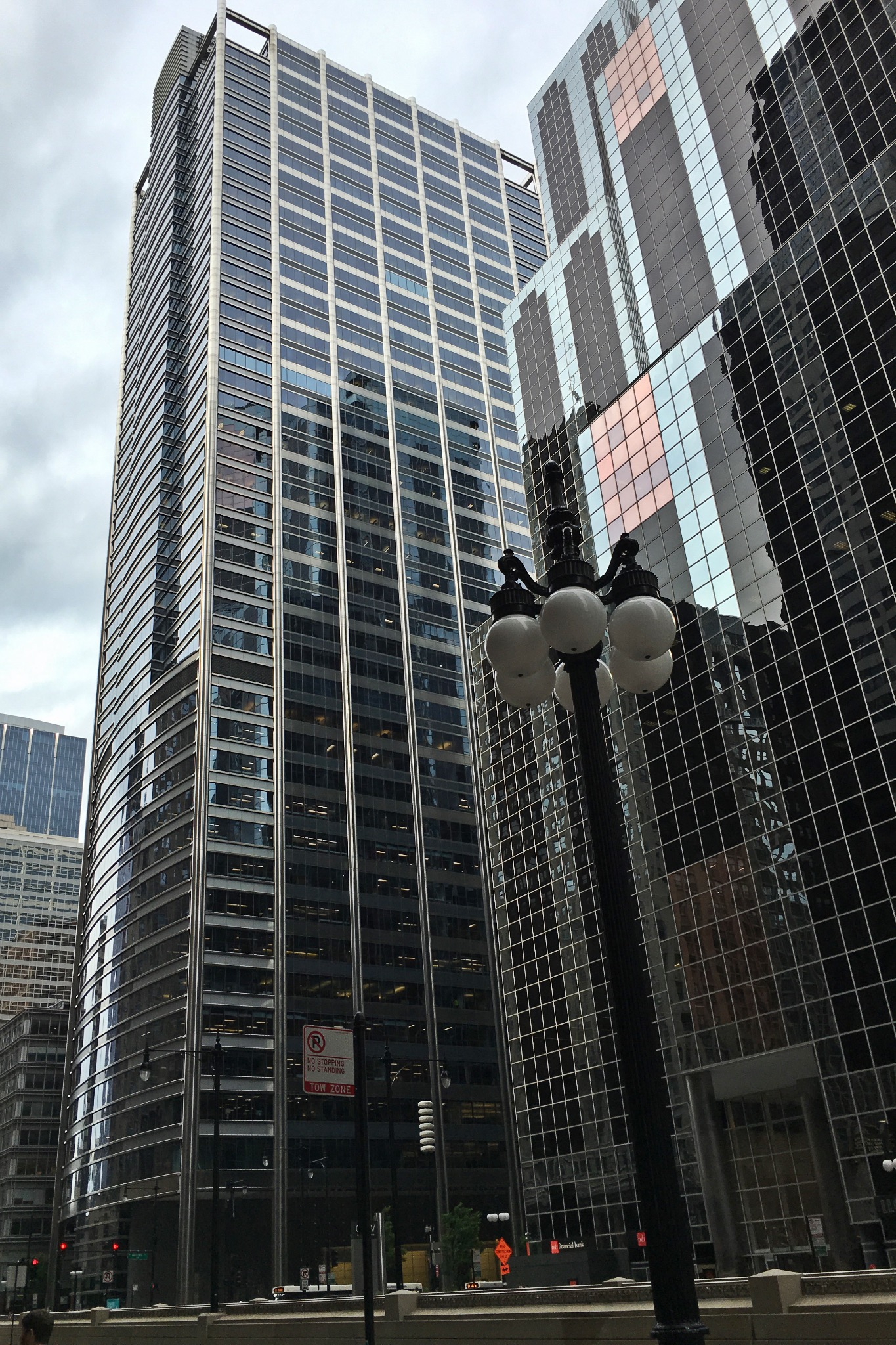
- Former names: UBS Tower

General information
- Type: Commercial offices
- Location: One North Wacker Drive; Chicago, Illinois
- Coordinates: 41.882249°N 87.636205°W
- Completed: 2002
- Owner: Pontegadea Inversiones
- Operator: JLL

Height
- Roof: 199 m (653 ft)
- Top floor: 183 m (600 ft)

Technical details
- Floor count: 50
- Floor area: 1,400,000 sq ft (130,000 m^{2})

Design and construction
- Architects: Lohan Associates (now Goettsch Partners)
- Developer: John Buck Company

One North Wacker is a 50-story (199 m (653 ft)) skyscraper at One North Wacker Drive in downtown Chicago, Illinois. The tower was built from 1999 to 2002 to accommodate Swiss investment bank UBS AG's Chicago headquarters. Originally UBS Tower, as it was solely known then, housed four different branches of the bank including its investment banking, wealth management advisory, asset management, and private banking businesses.

One North Wacker was designed by Lohan Associates (now Goettsch Partners) and developed by John Buck Company. It is owned by Pontegadea Inversiones, the family office of Amancio Ortega, the founder of Zara and parent company Inditex.

== Building ==
It was the first large multi-tenant tower to be constructed in Chicago for six years since 1993.

=== Architecture ===
The tower's main lobby's glass wall was a first in the United States. The 40-foot (12 m) wall was made out of 5' x 5' glass panes attached to a system of medallions and cable. This cable system was tested at pressures above 150 psf, or a wind speed of nearly 250 mph. The glass itself is also noteworthy: an optical interference anti-reflective glass (designed by Schott AG) with an unusually low surface reflectivity of 1% is used. This imbues the lobby with an almost transparent appearance.

Exterior landscaping was designed by the Berkeley, California-based firm, Peter Walker and Partners Landscape Architecture Inc.

Enclos, a facade engineering and curtain wall design company, designed and installed the first ever cable net glass wall in the United States at the lobby area of One North Wacker in downtown Chicago. The cable net strategy developed effectively minimized the sightlines of the steel support structure supporting the glass, allowing architect Goettsch Partners to achieve maximum transparency with a series of 15 meter glass facades that wrap the perimeter of the lobby space in over 1,500 square meters of glass.

=== Artwork ===
Artwork throughout the building is drawn from the UBS PaineWebber Collection of contemporary art pieces and from the UBS Global Asset Management collection of architectural relics. Roy Lichtenstein's sculpture, Archaic Head, is displayed on the 38th floor near Louis Sullivan's elevator gate, claimed from the old Chicago Stock Exchange.

=== Use ===
With 1,754,000 sq ft (163,000 m^{2}) of floorspace, this tower's rents are among the highest per square foot of any building in the Chicago Metropolitan Area at an average of over $25 per square foot on a triple net basis, grossing up to over $40 per square foot. The building amenities also include a two-story underground garage for senior executives, One North Kitchen and Bar, a Conference Center, Fitness Center and Convenience Store. The building also has a cafeteria on the 30th floor, which serves a range of traditional and contemporary American cuisine as well as other cuisine featured from around the world on a rotating basis.

== Awards ==
In March 2002, the building was recognized as "Development of the Year” at the 14th Annual Greater Chicago Commercial Real Estate Awards.

== Major tenants ==
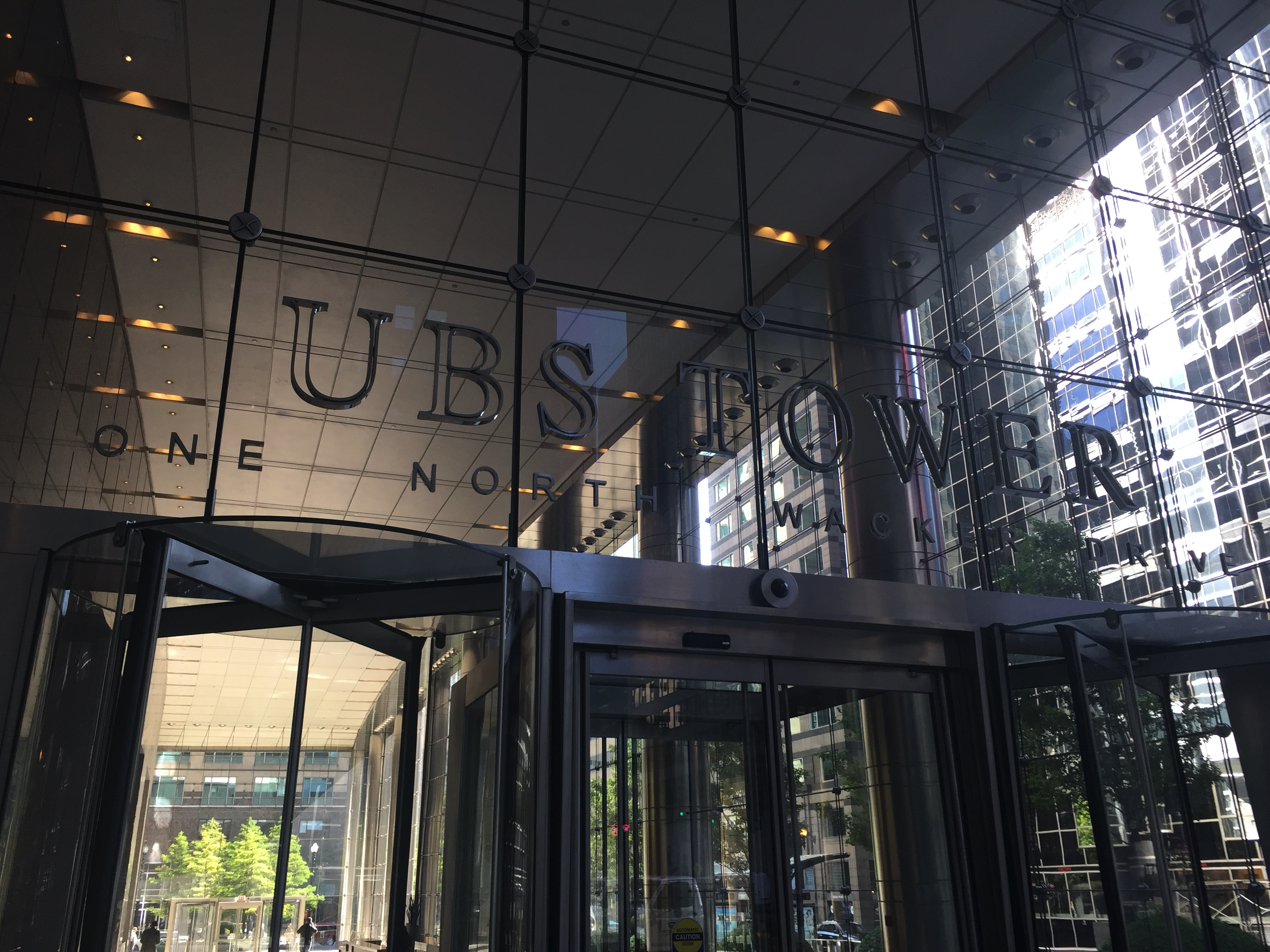
The entrance of UBS Tower at One North Wacker Drive

- Adams Street Partners
- Barnes & Thornburg LLP
- Fitch Group
- Gordon Rees Scully Mansukhani LLP ("GRSM50")
- Northwestern Mutual
- PwC
- Red Chalk Group
- Stifel
- UBS AG
- Macquarie Group
- ArcelorMittal

== See also ==
- List of skyscrapers
- List of tallest buildings in the United States
- List of tallest buildings in Chicago
- World's tallest structures
