= List of rivers of Orange County, California =

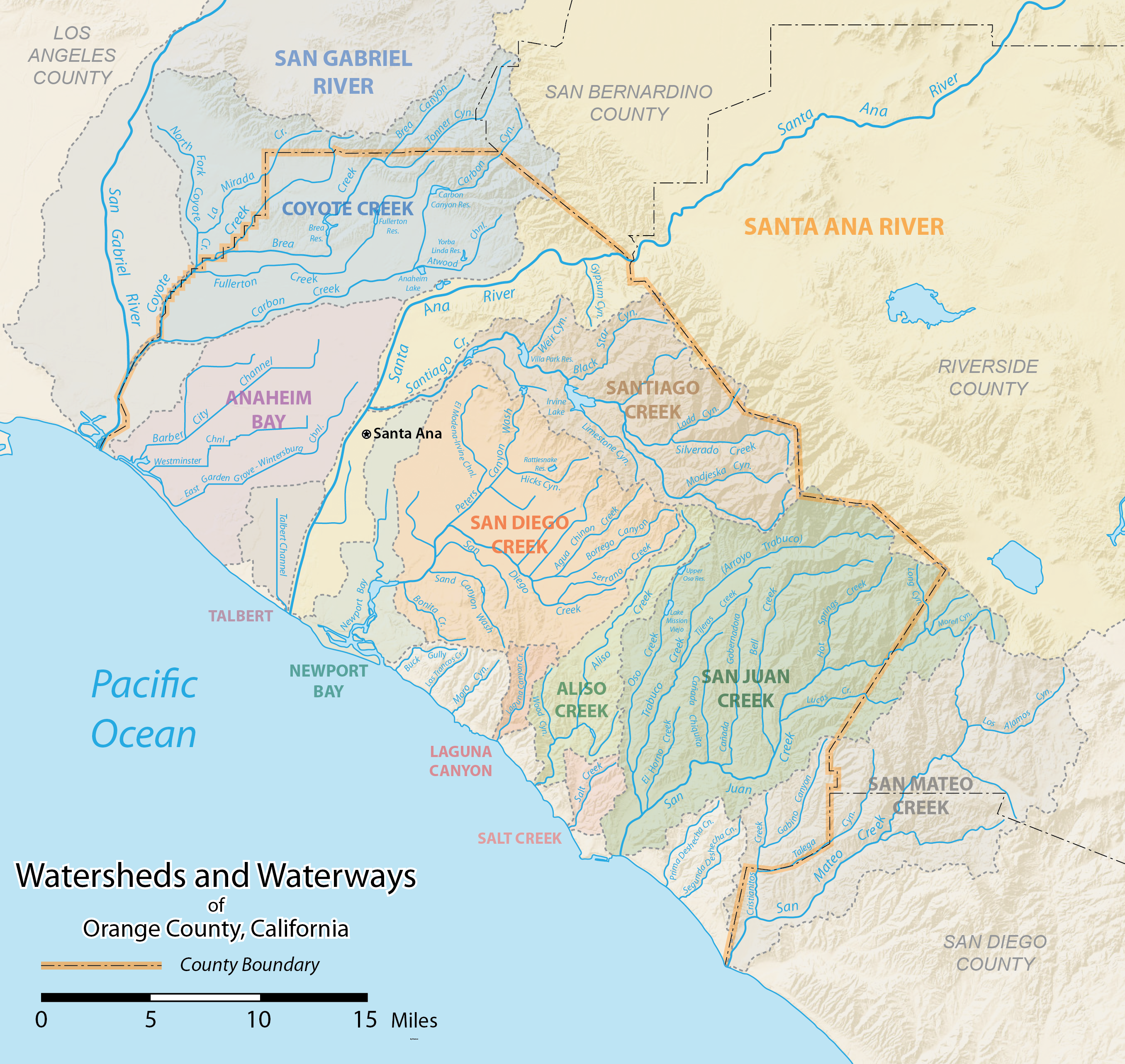
Map showing the main Orange County watersheds and watercourses.

This is a list of rivers of Orange County, California, part of the Greater Los Angeles Area in Southern California.The Santa Ana River and San Gabriel River are the largest in Orange County; their extensive watersheds extend into neighboring Los Angeles, Riverside and San Bernardino Counties. A number of smaller streams originate in or flow largely within Orange County, chief of which are Coyote Creek, Santiago Creek, San Diego Creek, Aliso Creek, and San Juan Creek. Many streams in the area received their names from Spanish explorers in the 18th century.

With the exception of mountain regions, Orange County is characterized by dense suburban and urban development. To protect the county's 3 million people from floods, many streams were channelized and/or lined with concrete in the 20th century. In addition, some wholly artificial streams were constructed to drain the large coastal wetlands and floodplains in north Orange County, namely in the Anaheim Bay watershed. Although the purpose of channelization is to carry floodwaters to the sea in an efficient manner, Orange County's streams have also been impacted by stormwater capture projects, to reduce the county's reliance on imported water. Such projects range from Irvine Lake – the county's largest body of fresh water, created by damming Santiago Creek in 1931 – to the extensive Santa Ana River groundwater recharge operations that provide as much as half the domestic water used in the county.

Watershed	Total area	Area within Orange County	%Total OC land area
Aliso Creek	22,400 acres (91 km^{2})	22,400 acres (91 km^{2})	4.38%
Anaheim Bay– Huntington Harbor	51,422 acres (208 km^{2})	51,422 acres (208 km^{2})	10.06%
Newport Bay	97,293 acres (394 km^{2})	97,293 acres (394 km^{2})	19.02%
San Gabriel River	440,960 acres (1,786 km^{2})	53,760 acres (218 km^{2})	10.51%
San Juan Creek	112,640 acres (456 km^{2})	102,387 acres (415 km^{2})	20.02%
San Mateo Creek	88,960 acres (360 km^{2})	12,262 acres (50 km^{2})	2.39%
Santa Ana River	1,696,000 acres (6,869 km^{2})	134,701 acres (546 km^{2})	26.34%

== San Gabriel River watershed ==
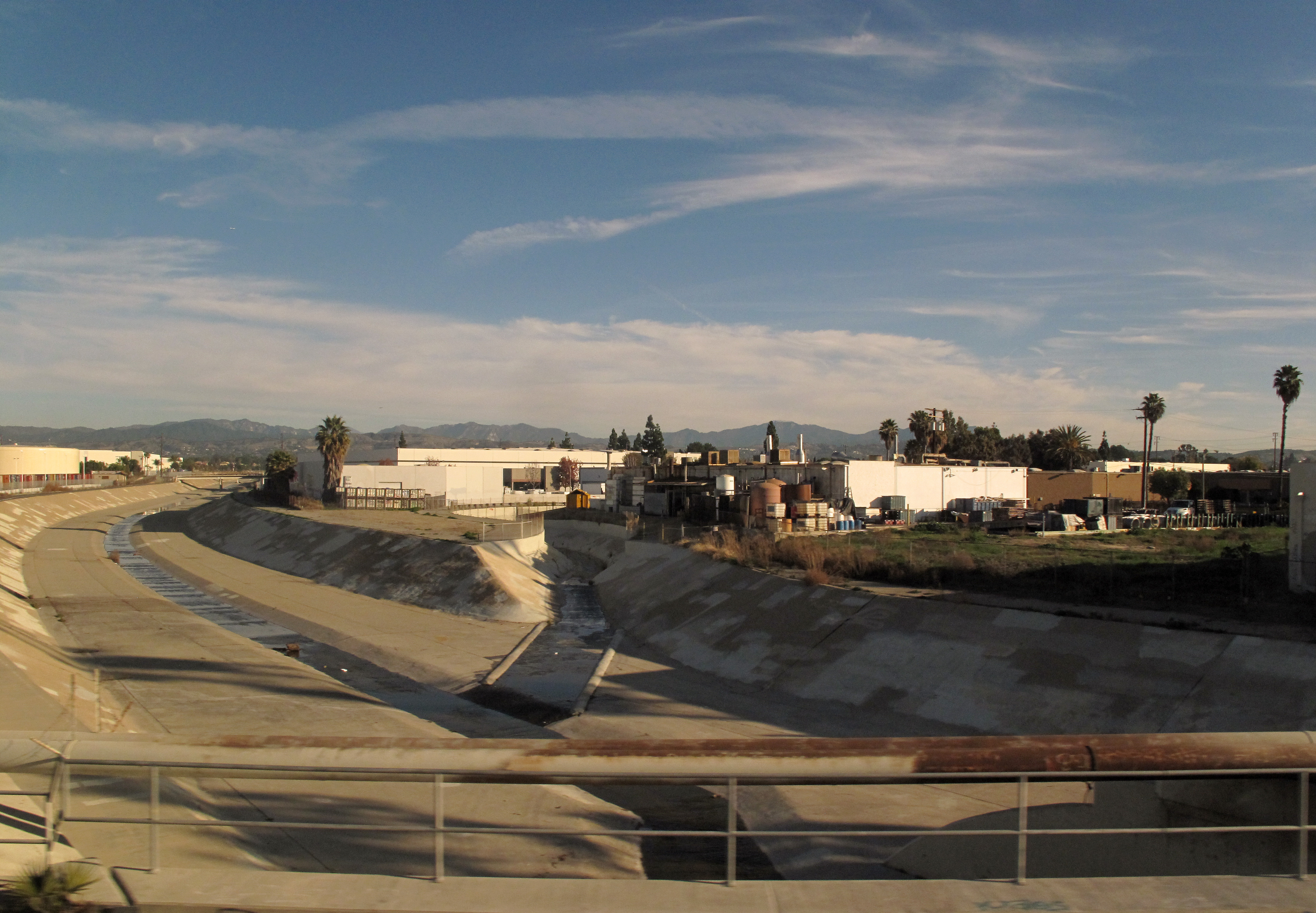
North Fork Coyote Creek in La Mirada

The San Gabriel River flows mainly in Los Angeles County, and forms part of the border between Orange and Los Angeles Counties.

- San Gabriel River
  - Coyote Creek
    - Carbon Creek
    - Moody Creek
    - Fullerton Creek
    - Brea Creek
      - Tonner Canyon
    - North Fork Coyote Creek (La Canada Verde Creek)
      - La Mirada Creek
    - Imperial Creek

== Anaheim Bay watershed ==
- Bolsa Chica Channel
  - Anaheim-Barber City Channel
  - Westminster Channel
- Sunset Channel
- East Garden Grove-Wintersburg Channel
  - Ocean View Channel

== Santa Ana River watershed ==
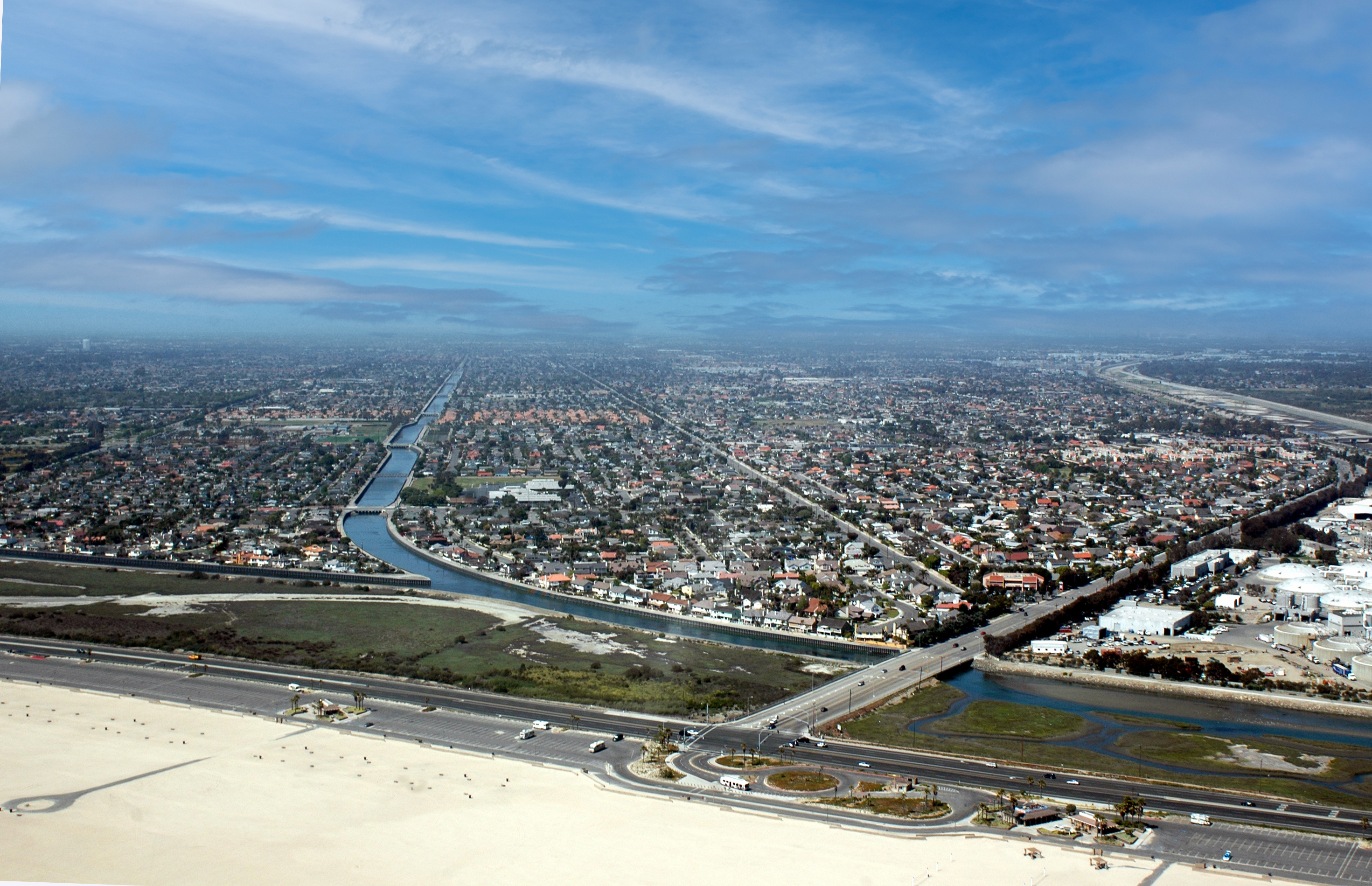
Huntington Beach and the Huntington Beach Channel

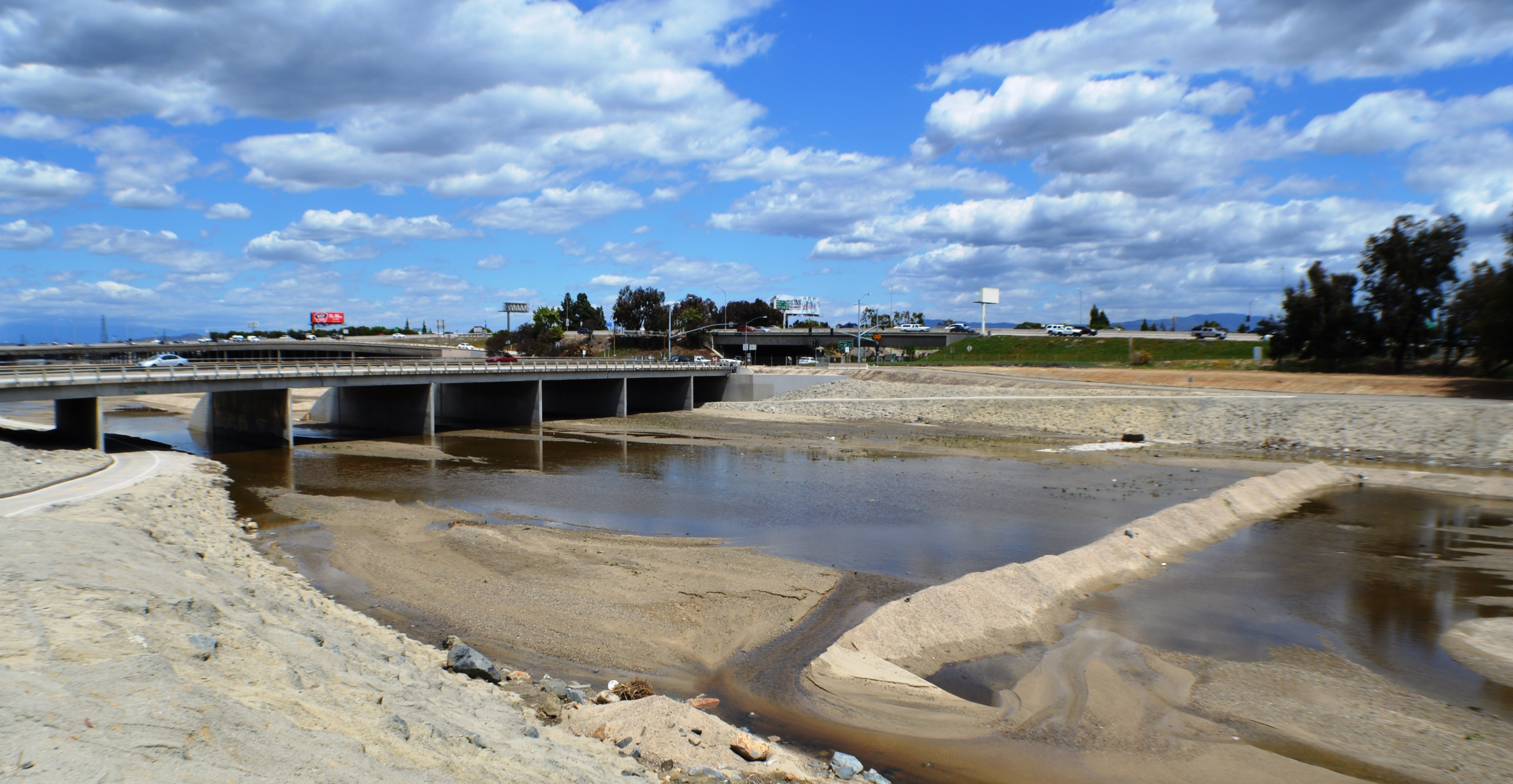
Santa Ana River in Orange

The 100-mile (160 km)-long Santa Ana River begins in San Bernardino County and flows through Riverside County before bisecting northern Orange County.

- Santa Ana River
  - Talbert Channel (Note: The Talbert watershed would naturally have drained into Santa Ana River but a separate artificial ocean outlet, just to the west of the Santa Ana River mouth, was constructed in the early 1900s.)
    - Huntington Beach Channel
  - Greenville-Banning Channel
  - Santiago Creek
    - Handy Creek
    - Weir Canyon
    - Fremont Canyon
    - Limestone Canyon
    - Black Star Canyon
    - Silverado Canyon
      - Ladd Canyon
    - Williams Canyon
    - Pancho Canyon
    - Modjeska Canyon
      - Harding Canyon
    - Bear Trap Canyon
  - Walnut Canyon
  - Blue Mud Canyon
  - Gypsum Canyon
  - Coal Canyon

== Newport Bay watershed ==
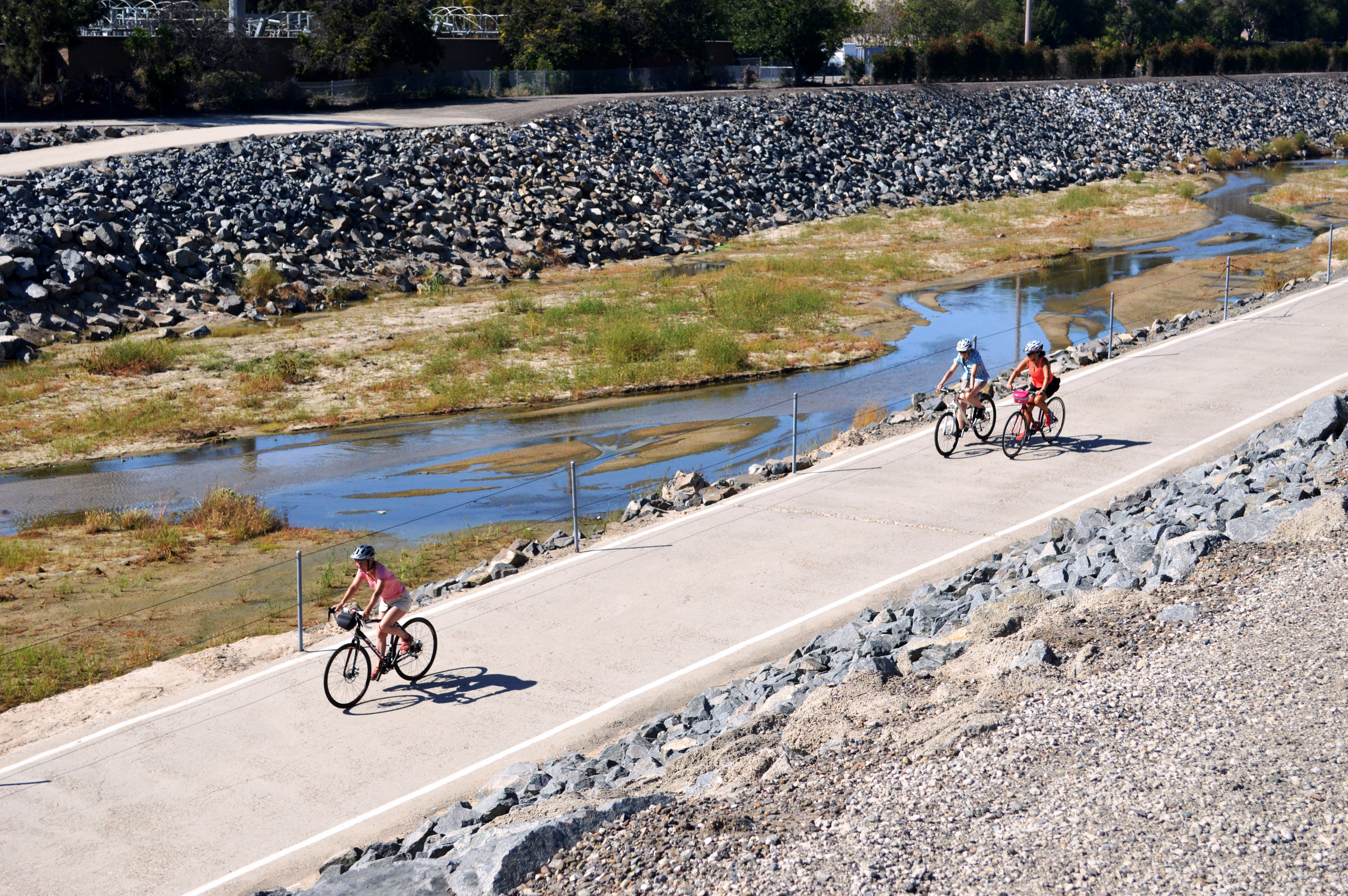
San Diego Creek in Irvine

- Santa Ana-Delhi Channel (Big Canyon)
  - Paularino Channel
  - Santa Ana Gardens Channel
- San Diego Creek
  - Bonita Creek
  - Sand Canyon Wash
  - San Joaquin Wash
  - Lane Channel
  - Peters Canyon Wash
    - Santa Ana-Santa Fe Channel
    - Como Channel
    - El Modena-Irvine Channel
    - Central Irvine Channel
    - Hicks Canyon Wash
    - Rattlesnake Canyon Wash
  - Marshburn Channel
  - Bee Canyon Wash
  - Agua Chinon Creek
    - Borrego Canyon Wash
    - La Cañada Creek
    - Serrano Creek

== Aliso Creek watershed ==
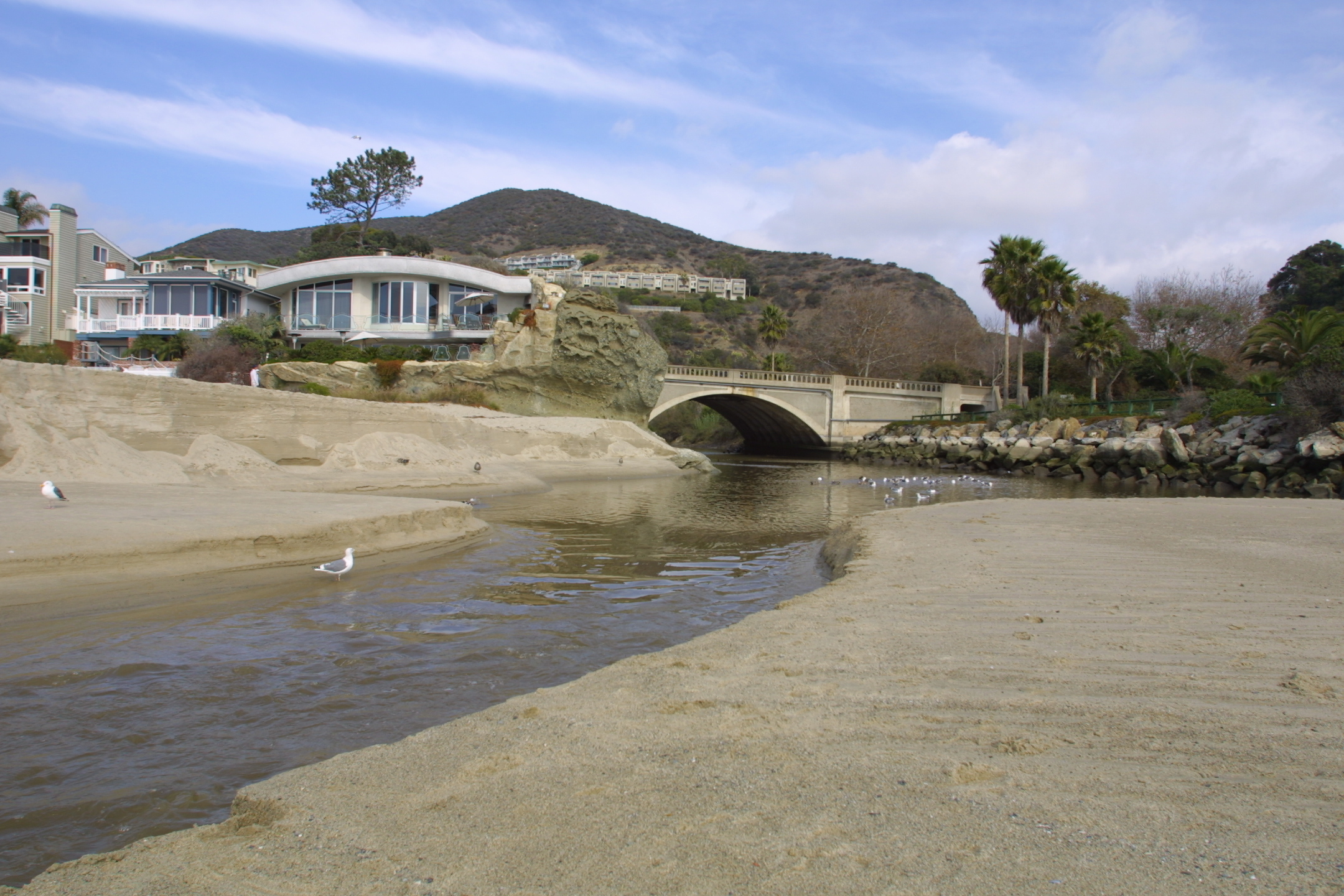
Aliso Creek at Laguna Beach

- Aliso Creek
  - Wood Canyon Creek
  - Sulphur Creek
    - Narco Channel
  - Dairy Fork
  - Aliso Hills Channel
  - English Canyon Creek
  - Munger Creek

== San Juan Creek watershed ==
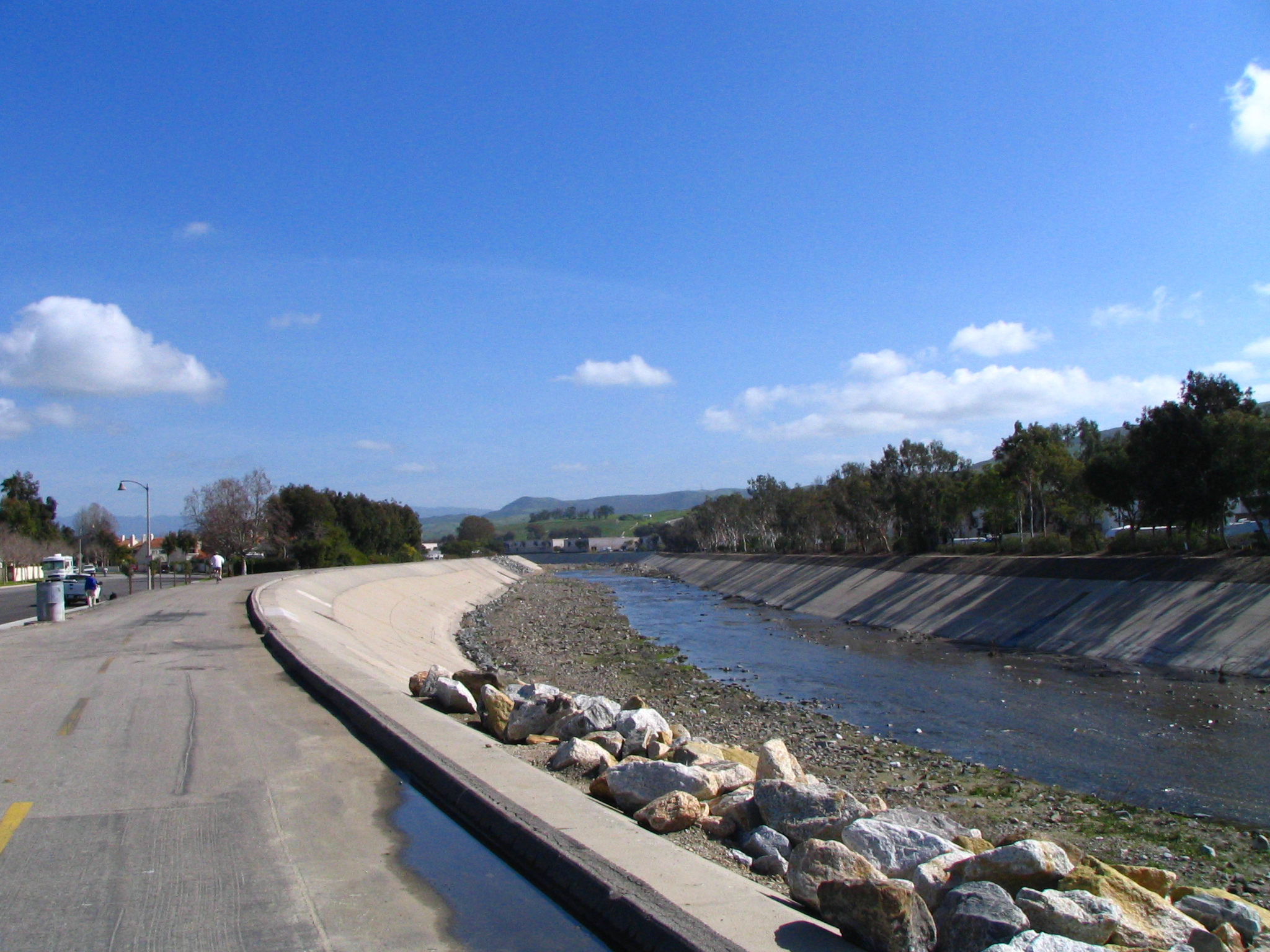
San Juan Creek in San Juan Capistrano

- San Juan Creek
  - Arroyo Trabuco (Trabuco Creek)
    - Oso Creek
      - La Paz Creek
    - Tijeras Canyon Creek
    - Live Oak Canyon Creek
    - Hickey Canyon Creek
    - Falls Canyon Creek
    - Holy Jim Creek
  - El Horno Creek
  - Cañada Chiquita
  - Cañada Gobernadora
  - Trampas Canyon
  - Bell Canyon
    - Crow Canyon
    - Dove Creek
    - Tick Creek
  - Verdugo Canyon
  - Lucas Canyon
    - Aliso Canyon
  - Cold Springs Canyon
  - Hot Springs Creek
  - Lion Canyon Creek
  - Long Canyon Creek

== San Mateo Creek watershed ==
San Mateo Creek is mostly in Riverside and San Diego Counties, with only a small portion in Orange County; however, some of its tributaries extend into Orange County.

- San Mateo Creek
  - Cristianitos Creek
    - Talega Canyon
    - Gabino Canyon

== Coastal streams ==
A number of smaller streams flow into the Pacific Ocean along the Orange County coast. They are listed below from north to south. Waterways indicated in the above lists are italicized, to clarify location:

- Newport Bay
- Buck Gully
- Los Trancos Canyon
- Muddy Canyon
- Moro Canyon
- Emerald Canyon
- Laguna Canyon
  - El Toro Creek
- Aliso Creek
- Salt Creek
  - Arroyo Salada Storm Channel
- San Juan Creek
- Prima Deshecha Cañada
- Segunda Deshecha Cañada
- San Mateo Creek

== See also ==
- List of tributaries of the Santa Ana River
- List of rivers of California
