= San Diego National Wildlife Refuge Complex =

Protected areas in California, United States

| Refuge | Coordinates |
|---|---|
| Seal Beach National Wildlife Refuge | 33.74168°N 118.07756°W |
| San Diego National Wildlife Refuge | 32°36′9″N 117°6′53″W |
| San Diego Bay National Wildlife Refuge | 32°36′12.39″N 117°07′24.29″W |
| San Diego Bay Sweetwater Marsh | 32°38′22″N 117°6′27″W |
| Tijuana Slough National Wildlife Refuge | 32.5565°N 117.1271°W |

The San Diego National Wildlife Refuge Complex is a series of wildlife refuges established by the United States National Wildlife Service beginning in 1972. The complex incorporates five refuges in San Diego County and Orange County in California.

== History ==
The first refuges were established to preserve and protect the rare birds of Southern California's coastal marshes. In the mid-1990s, the system was expanded to protect larger areas of coastal and inland open space under the Multiple Species Conservation Program, a cooperative project involving city, state, and federal authorities. The wildlife refuge complex now supports a diverse array of habitats including coastal marshes and uplands, chaparral, coastal sage scrub, oak woodland, freshwater marsh, vernal pool areas, and breeding and nesting grounds for migratory and resident birds.

== Seal Beach National Wildlife Refuge ==
This refuge is located on the grounds of the Seal Beach Naval Weapons Station in Orange County. It includes 965 acres of saltwater marsh in the Anaheim Bay estuary. It was established in 1972 for the benefit of migrating birds up and down the Pacific Flyway as well as a variety of local birds, fish, and plants. Public access is limited to once-a-month guided tours.

== San Diego National Wildlife Refuge ==
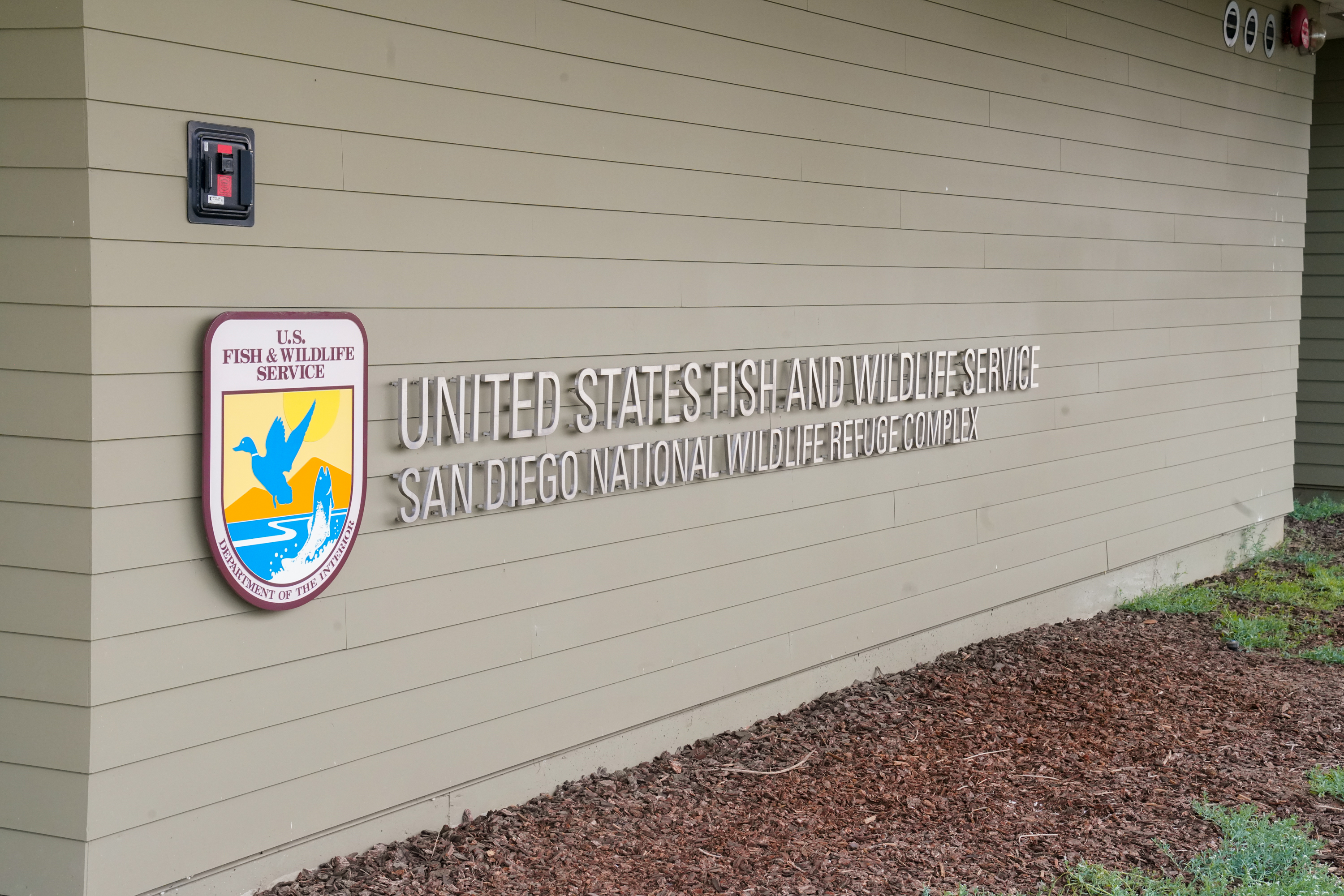
San Diego National Wildlife Refuge Complex

This is an inland refuge in San Diego's back country. Habitats include coastal sage scrub and chaparral to oak woodland and freshwater marsh. It is part of the Multiple Species Conservation Program and includes 44,000 acres.

== San Diego Bay National Wildlife Refuge ==
This area was dedicated in 1999 and includes 3,940 acres. It includes intertidal salt marsh and submerged areas with eelgrass beds. It is the largest remaining contiguous mudflat in southern California and is an important stop for migrating birds on the Pacific Flyway. The area has walking and biking paths as well as vantage points for bird watching. It includes some former salt evaporation ponds which the wildlife service is trying to turn back into natural wetland. The state Wildlife Conservation Board contributed a grant in 2010 to try to restore 65 acres of highly damaged habitat in the refuge.

== San Diego Bay Sweetwater Marsh ==
The Sweetwater Marsh area comprises 316 acres of salt marsh estuary where the Sweetwater River enters San Diego Bay. It was established in 1996. Some highly endangered species have been seen returning to the marsh since its establishment as a refuge.

The Living Coast Discovery Center is located at the marsh. Formerly known as the Chula Vista Nature Center, the independent Living Coast Discovery Center is dedicated to providing environmental education on coastal resource conservation. Exhibits include many aquariums and displays of local marine life and reptiles, a sea turtle lagoon, outdoor aviaries of rescued birds, a shark and ray exhibit, and hiking trails. Guided hikes are available as well as educational programs for elementary school children. The center is located at the foot of E Avenue in Chula Vista, just west of Interstate 5.

== Tijuana Slough National Wildlife Refuge ==
The Tijuana Slough National Wildlife Refuge is a 1,051 acre wetland where the Tijuana River enters the Pacific Ocean. It is also part of the Tijuana River National Estuarine Research Reserve. It is the only coastal lagoon in California which does not have any roads or rail lines built across it. More than 370 species of birds have been recorded in the refuge and the adjacent Tijuana River valley. A visitor center is open to the public featuring educational programs and exhibits, four miles of trails, and a native plant garden.

== Vernal pools ==
Vernal pools are temporary pools that form for a few months during the wet season and are dry the rest of the year. They house some of the area's rarest animals, including the San Diego fairy shrimp and the Western spadefoot toad, which lie dormant under the ground during the dry season and emerge when the pools refill with water. Vernal pools are of special interest within the complex because they are so rare. It is estimated that only 3% of the area's original vernal pools remain.
