= Carbon Canyon =

Carbon Canyon may refer to:

- Carbon Canyon Regional Park, a county park in Brea, California.
- California State Route 142 (Carbon Canyon Road), a state highway that travels between Orange County and San Bernardino County in California.
- Carbon Canyon Dam, a dam at the northeastern edge of Orange County, California.
- Carbon Canyon (Malibu, California)
