= Carbon Creek =

Carbon Creek may refer to:

- Carbon Creek, a California waterway downstream from the Carbon Canyon Dam
- "Carbon Creek" (Star Trek: Enterprise), the 2002 second episode of the second season of the science fiction television series Star Trek: Enterprise
