= Naval Weapons Station =

Naval Weapons Station may stand for:

- Naval Weapons Station Charleston, South Carolina
- Naval Weapons Station Earle, New Jersey
- Naval Weapons Station Seal Beach, California
- Naval Weapons Station Yorktown, Virginia
- Naval Air Weapons Station China Lake, California
- Former Concord Naval Weapons Station, California
