= Brea Creek =

Watercourse in California, United States

- Location of the mouth of Brea Creek in California
- Etymology: Presumably named after Brea, California, or the city was named for the creek.

Location
- Country: United States
- State: California
- Counties: Orange County, San Bernardino, Los Angeles County
- Cities: Brea, Fullerton, Whittier

Physical characteristics
- Source
  - location: La Habra, Orange County, California
  - coordinates: 33°53′22″N 117°55′37″W
  - elevation: 690 ft (210 m)
- Mouth: Coyote Creek
  - location: Whittier, California
  - coordinates: 33°52′40″N 118°00′32″W
  - elevation: 65 ft (20 m)
- Length: 11.7 mi (18.8 km)
- Basin size: 23.6 sq mi (61 km^{2})
- Discharge
  - location: mouth
  - average: 1.4 cu ft/s (0.040 m^{3}/s)
  - minimum: 0 cu ft/s (0 m^{3}/s)
  - maximum: 3,700 cu ft/s (100 m^{3}/s)

Brea Creek is one of four principal tributaries of Coyote Creek, which is a lower tributary of the San Gabriel River in California. It drains parts of Orange, Riverside, and San Bernardino counties. The creek flows 11.7 miles (18.8 km) from the cities of Brea and Anaheim to Whittier, where its mouth is on the left bank of Coyote Creek, at a point 481 feet (147 m) lower in elevation.

== Ancient times ==
In ancient times, Brea Creek was utilized by the Tongva nation, which means people of the earth and later referred to by the Spanish as the ‘Gabrieliño’, that inhabited the La Habra valley for the past 10,000 years. Brea was then within the ethnographic boundaries of the Tongva; their village was called Nacaunga in the Tongva language and was strategically located at the mouth of Brea Canyon adjacent to Brea Creek.

== Colonial times ==
In colonial times, on Saturday, July 29, 1769, the Spanish explorer Don Gaspar de Portolá i Rovira, along with Father Junipero Serra and others such as José Antonio Yorba (from whom the City of Yorba Linda in Orange County was eventually named), camped at Brea Canyon north of Fullerton within the La Habra Valley region near a stream [Brea Creek] and near a canyon [Brea Canyon] called in the Spanish tongue ‘La Cañada de la Brea’, having crossed the Santa Ana River along El Camino Real, through modern-day Anaheim, Fullerton, Brea, and La Habra on their famed march from San Diego to Monterey. Moreover, most of the waterways in the Orange County area received their name from Spanish Conquistadores in the 18th century.

== Course ==
The creek begins in the northeasternmost part of the Coyote Creek drainage basin, in a mountain canyon named Brea Canyon, at the Los Angeles County–San Bernardino County line. It flows southwest, receiving over ten small right-bank tributaries, before crossing the Orange County–Riverside County line and receiving Tonner Canyon (also Toner) on the left bank. The creek bends northwest then sharply southwest, receives a few more tributaries on either bank, and flows into the northernmost arm of the Brea Reservoir. Exiting the Brea Reservoir dam, the creek bends west-northwest in a straight and channelized course, receives several small right-bank tributaries, flows past a retention basin on the left bank, and joins Coyote Creek shortly upstream of Fullerton Creek, the next major tributary.

== Streamflow ==
From 1932 to 1969, the USGS operated two streamflow gauges on Brea Creek, one at the mouth and one at Brea Reservoir. The highest flow recorded at the mouth (Fullerton) was 3,700 cubic feet per second (100 m^{3}/s) on 14 March 1941. Four other flows during that period exceeded 1,000 second-feet, all before 1941.

== River modifications ==
There are four drop structures on Brea Creek, all of which are built of reinforced concrete, in the lower course of the creek, which is referred to as the "Brea Canyon Channel".

== See also ==
- List of rivers of Orange County, California
- List of rivers of California
- Carbon Creek, a lower tributary of Coyote Creek very near the San Gabriel River
