= Seal Beach National Wildlife Refuge =

Wildlife refuge in California

- IUCN category IV (habitat/species management area)
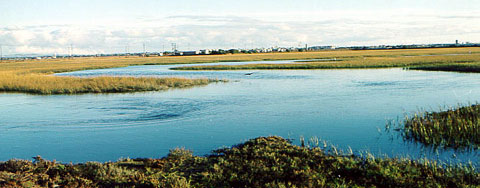
- Marsh wetlands of the Wildlife Refuge.

- Location within the United States
- Location: Orange County, California, United States
- Nearest city: Seal Beach, California
- Coordinates: 33°44′16″N 118°04′27″W
- Area: 911 acres (3.69 km^{2})
- Established: 1972
- Governing body: U.S. Fish and Wildlife Service
- Website: Seal Beach National Wildlife Refuge

Seal Beach National Wildlife Refuge is a wildlife refuge encompassing 1.5 mi^{2} (3.9 km^{2}) located in the California coastal community of Seal Beach. Although it is located in Orange County, it is included as part of the San Diego National Wildlife Refuge Complex. It was established in 1972.

The refuge is a collaboration between the United States Fish and Wildlife Service and the Department of the Navy. It serves as a critical habitat and winter stopover for many birds along the Pacific Flyway. Among the birds found at the refuge are great blue herons and the three endangered bird species: California clapper rail, California least tern, and Belding's Savannah sparrow.

The refuge is located within Naval Weapons Station Seal Beach. Public access in the refuge is limited or restricted to monthly tours (last Saturday of each month) as it is located within an active military base.

== Habitat ==
=== Subtidal habitat ===
The subtidal zone is the shallow, near-shore area below the intertidal zone, the land between the high and low tide marks. The subtidal zone is permanently inundated, except for rare lowest low tide events. There are four tidal basins created for the restoration of wetland: Forrestal Pond, Case Road Pond, 7th Street Pond, and Perimeter Pond, which are currently supporting the subtidal habitat in the Refuge. Tidal water from Anaheim Bay supports the ponds.

The dominant plant in these subtidal habitat is eelgrass, and the mudflat portions of the habitat support many invertebrate species.

=== Intertidal channels and tidal mudflat habitats ===
The complex system of tidal channels delivers moisture and nourishment (oxygen and nutrients) throughout the habitat and provides food or pathways to food for fish and other organisms.

The soil of intertidal flats is a combination of clay, silt, sand, shells, algae, and other organic matter.

Mudflats contain organisms which are a major food source for worms and invertebrates. Fishes, sharks, and rays would often come to the mudflats with the tides and feed on transient or permanent residing fish. Shorebirds also prey on invertebrates on the mudflats.

=== Coastal salt marsh habitat ===
Coastal salt marsh habitat, situated above mudflats, contains salt-tolerant vegetation. It is the predominant habitat in the refuge, occupying 565 acres. It is a nesting, feeding, and cover area for birds and fish, including the endangered light-footed clapper rails and Belding's Savannah sparrow.

A study on the light-footed clapper rail was conducted in 1979. One of the study areas is in the salt marsh in Anaheim Bay, the coastal salt marsh located in Seal Beach National Wildlife Refuge. The environment of salt marsh was described: "The surrounding land lands are flat or gently sloping and provide little drainage into the bay. Consequently there are very little fresh water input other than winter rains… Most of the vegetation is characteristic of the low and middle littoral zones and is completely inundated by a 1.8 m tide (Mean Lower Low Water)." A list of major plants in the marsh was also provided: cordgrass (dominant plants at lower elevation), pickleweed and saltwort (dominant in middle elevation), seablite, saltgrass, sea lavender, arrowgrass, Jaumea carnosa, and Frankenia grandiflora. The dominant plants in the upper zone are glasswort and pickleweed. In the highest elevation (which sometimes is referred to as wetland/upland transition), there are no remaining native species.

Oil extraction beneath the bay led to the marsh subsiding. From 1957 to 1970, its elevation dropped 12.5 centimetres (4.9 in), and by 1984, it had dropped by 25 centimetres (9.8 in).

=== Upland habitat ===
41 acres within 65 acres of the uplands areas were built into roads, railroad tracks, or other manmade structures. Most of these areas were originally wetland but were replaced for agricultural or military practices in the 19th century.

Situated in the southern part of the Refuge, Hog Island was the only place that supported native vegetation, although none of it has been left for today. There are three "arms" stretching out of the land (used by the military in the past) planted with native vegetation today to support and shelter upland birds, especially during high tides.

NASA Island is completely manmade, built in the 1960s for rocket testing, and used for that purpose until 1977. It is leveled today and covered with sand to provide a nesting site for the least tern.

One of the non-native upland islands, located in the 7th Street Pond, supports non-native vegetation including five-horn smotherweed, common thistle, Maltese star-thistle, milk thistle, tumbleweed, black mustard, and the native pickleweed. Another one, in Case Road Pond, supports native intertidal vegetation, and some of the non-native vegetation mentioned.

== Historical change ==
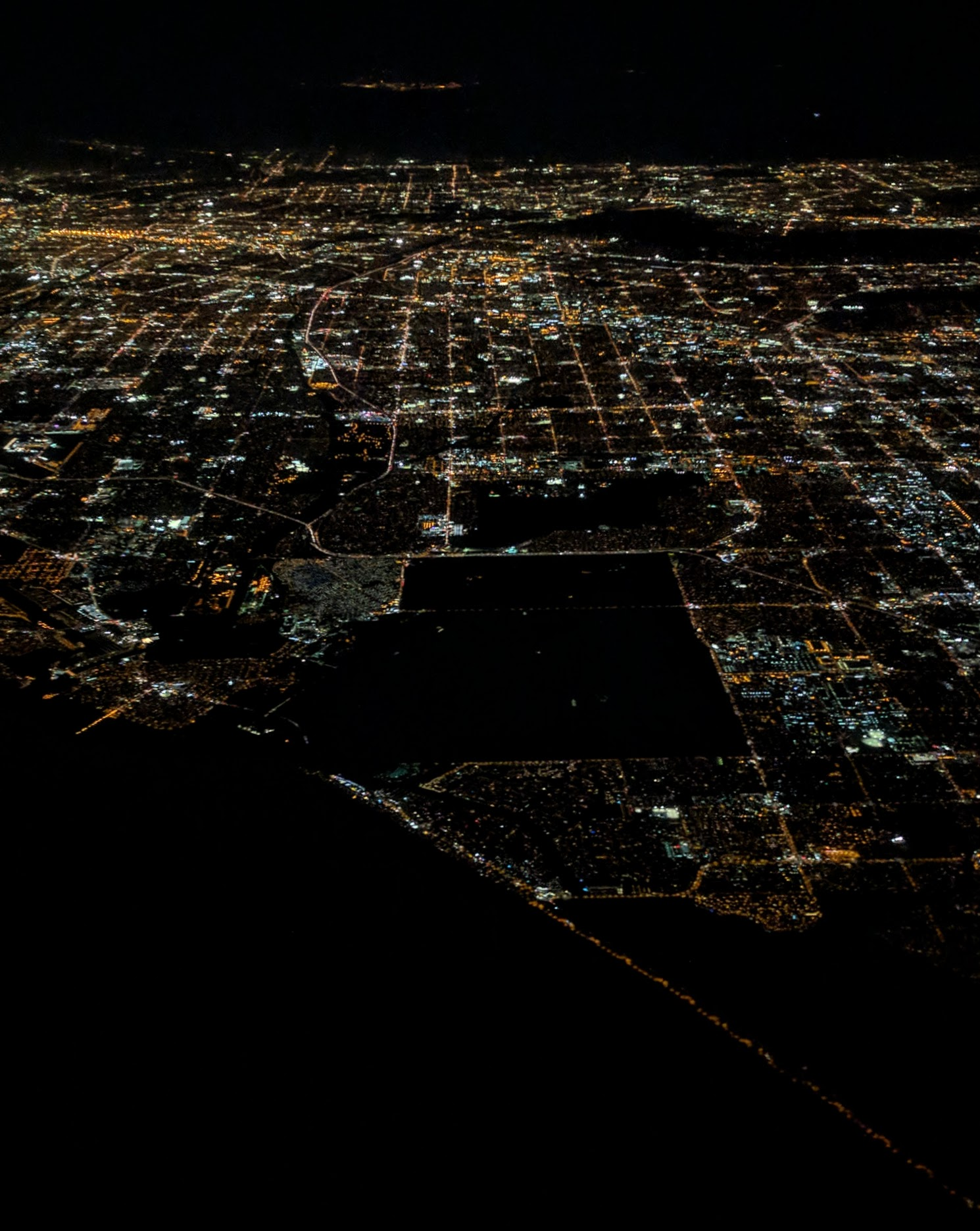
Night aerial view of Seal Beach, California, and vicinity, from the south. The large dark rectangle is the Naval Weapons Station Seal Beach, and the dark blob that extends it to the coast is the Seal Beach National Wildlife Refuge. In the lower right, the dark area separated from the ocean by the lighted California Highway 1 is the Bolsa Chica Ecological Reserve in Huntington Beach.

In 1944, the Department of the Navy acquired about 7.8 mi^{2} (20 km^{2}) of land in and around Anaheim Bay from the Alamitos Land Company. Although the Navy purchased the land, the California State Lands Commission held all of the submerged lands within the station. In May 1954, the Service contacted the Navy, regarding a potential hunting program on their land; however, the Navy rejected permission. Between 1954 and 1956, the Service made several additional proposals to the Navy for managing its lands including raising food crops to support waterfowl. In 1963, Congressman Richard Hanna told the Service he was interested in establishing a Refuge between Huntington Beach and Seal Beach. This cooperative plan for 600 acres of tidal marsh on Naval Weapons Station Seal Beach (NWSSB) was approved in 1964 through a three-way agreement among the Navy, the Service, and the California Department of Fish and Game. In 1971, there was a new discussion about establishing a Refuge at this location. This ultimately triggered political intervention by U.S. Congressman Craig Hosmer and California State Senator Dennis Carpenter. Through the efforts of Congressman Hosmer, President Nixon signed Public Law 92-408 in August 1972, authorizing the establishment of a National Wildlife Refuge on the NWSSB. The Refuge was officially established on July 11, 1974, when the Notice of the Establishment, which included the specific boundaries of the Refuge, was published in the Federal Register.

== Environmental change ==
Loss of habitat

In 1989, there was a big trapping of hundreds of foxes at Seal Beach National Wildlife Refuge. The red foxes were killed because they put a significant threat to two endangered species of birds, light-footed clapper rail and the California least tern. Even though an animal rights group had requested an injunction to prohibit trapping and maiming the foxes at the refuge, a U.S District Judge refused to grant it. Thus, hundreds of foxes were sacrificed to preserve the light-footed clapper rail and the California least tern. Nowadays, no foxes or other predatory mammals can be seen at Seal Beach National Wildlife Refuge.

Toxic Contamination

In 1995, there was a US Navy study that found elevated levels of toxic chemicals in the carcasses and food of endangered birds at Seal Beach National Wildlife Refuge. The elevated levels of cadmium, chromium, copper, lead, nickel, and zinc, all poisonous heavy metals, were found in dead California least terns and light-footed clapper rails. However, these potentially toxic substances were not only found in the birds, but also found in smaller animals normally eaten by them. They also found small amounts of PCBs and DDT, a dangerous pesticide that was banned by the Endangered Species Act in 1973. To find the cause, the Navy assessed the impacts of ponds on the refuge on the birds. They found that a construction by the Port of Long Beach that has raised the volume and velocity of the bay water flowing into the refuge. The toxic materials affect the birds with altered growth patterns, reduced survival, loss of appetite, lethargy, difficulty in reproducing, and even death.

== Studies ==
Study of the endangered light-footed clapper rail was conducted in 1979. This study mainly focuses on the three remaining largest populations in Anaheim Bay, Upper Newport Bay and Tijuana Marsh in San Diego County.

Study of the California least tern nesting season was conducted in 1980. This study mainly focuses on previously color-banded least tern chicks' nesting behavior in Seal Beach National Wildlife Refuge. A least tern nesting site was prepared in the refuge in 1978 for the study.

== Draft Comprehensive Conservation Plan/Environmental Assessment ==
In March 2011, Draft Comprehensive Conservation Plan/Environmental Assessment (CCP/EA) was established to "describes and evaluates various alternatives for managing Seal Beach National Wildlife Refuge (NWR)."
