= Coyote Creek (San Gabriel River tributary) =

Tributary of the San Gabriel River in California

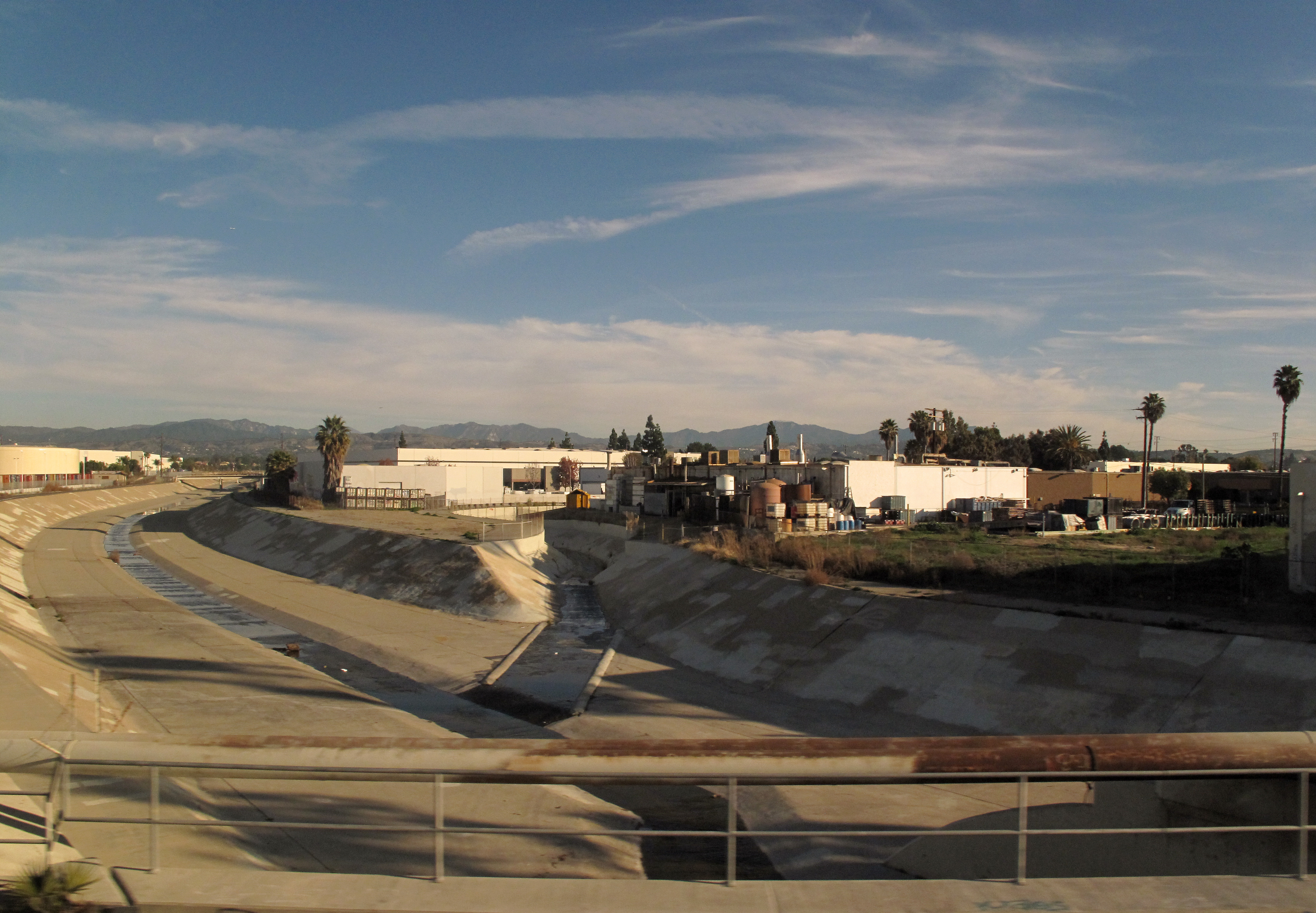
- North Fork of Coyote Creek in La Mirada

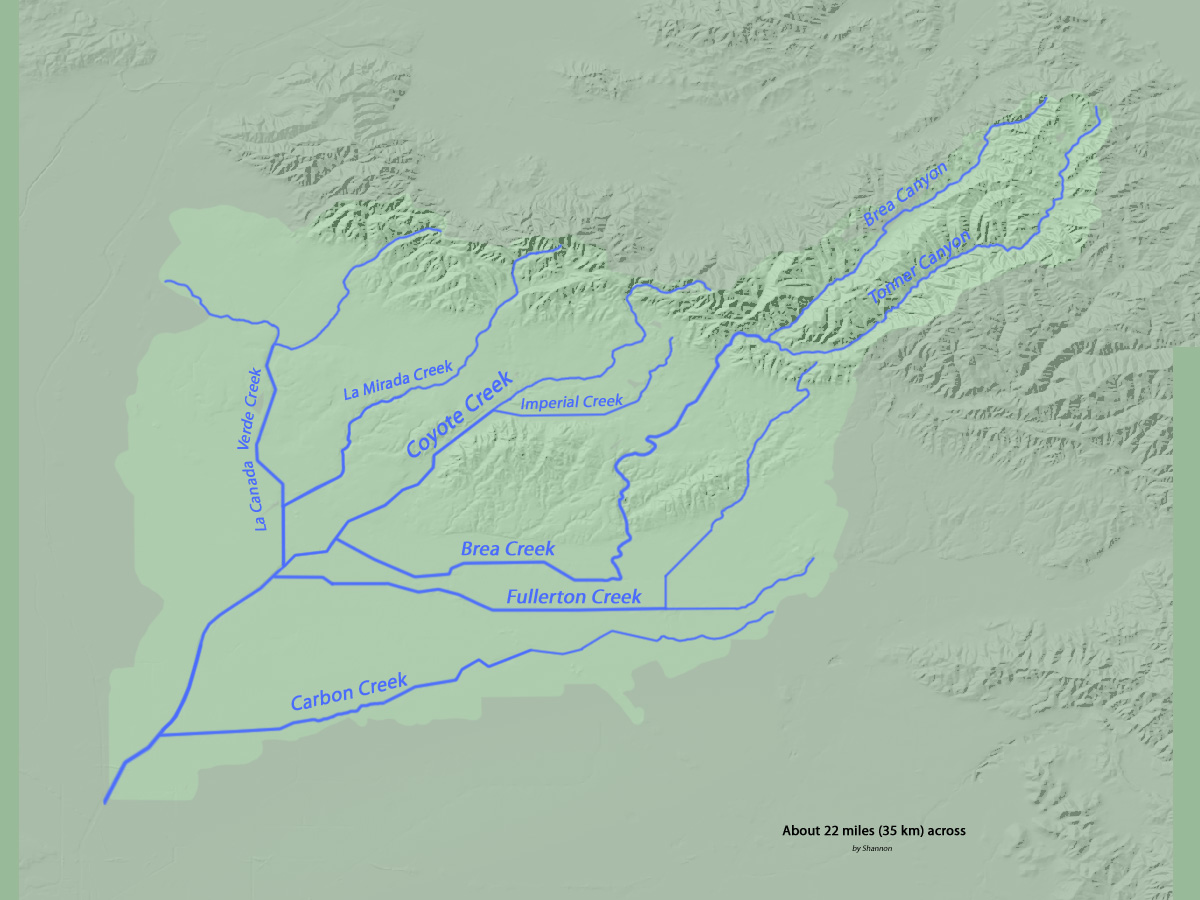
- Map of the Coyote Creek watershed
- Etymology: Unknown

Location
- Country: United States
- State: California
- Counties: Orange County, Riverside County, Los Angeles, San Bernardino
- Cities: Brea, Buena Park, Cerritos, Fullerton, Hawaiian Gardens, La Habra, Lakewood, La Palma, Long Beach,

Physical characteristics
- Source
  - location: Orange County, California
  - coordinates: 33°56′49″N 117°57′31″W
  - elevation: 2,300 ft (700 m)
- Mouth: San Gabriel River
  - coordinates: 33°47′41″N 118°05′24″W
  - elevation: 0 ft (0 m)
- Length: 13.7 mi (22.0 km)
- Basin size: 41.3 mi^{2} (107 km^{2})
- Discharge
  - location: Los Alamitos
  - average: 43.5 cu ft/s (1.23 m^{3}/s)
  - minimum: 24 cu ft/s (0.68 m^{3}/s)
  - maximum: 14,300 cu ft/s (400 m^{3}/s)

Basin features
- Tributaries
  - left: Brea Creek, Fullerton Creek, Carbon Creek
  - right: La Canada Verde Creek

Coyote Creek is a principal tributary of the San Gabriel River in northwest Orange County and southeast Los Angeles County, California. It drains a land area of roughly 41.3 square miles (107 km^{2}) covering nine major cities, including Brea, Buena Park, Cerritos, Fullerton, Hawaiian Gardens, La Habra, Lakewood, La Palma, and Long Beach.

Some major tributaries of the creek in the highly urbanized watershed include Brea Creek, Fullerton Creek, and Carbon Creek. The mostly-flat creek basin is separated by a series of low mountains, and is bounded by several small mountain ranges, including the Chino Hills, Puente Hills, and West Coyote Hills.

== Course ==
Coyote Creek is roughly 13.7 miles (22.0 km) long and flows generally southwest, while its North Fork, shown on federal maps as La Canada Verde Creek, measures 9.1 miles (14.6 km). The longest single tributary is Carbon Creek, which flows 13.6 miles (21.9 km), followed closely by Fullerton Creek, which measures 13.0 miles (20.9 km). Two major flood control reservoirs, Brea Reservoir and Fullerton Reservoir, are located in the watershed and feed into Brea Creek and Fullerton Creek, respectively. Brea Creek and Tonner Canyon form the uppermost reaches of the watershed. Coyote Creek joins the San Gabriel River very near its mouth in Long Beach.

Beginning at the border of Los Angeles and Orange Counties, Coyote Creek rises in two forks in the northwesterly corner of the latter county. As it goes south, it turns west and quickly acquires many south-flowing streams on its right bank. The creek is soon joined by Imperial Creek as it begins to flow southwest through a series of flood control channels, alternatively earth- and concrete-lined. The somewhat-haphazardly-constructed channel is described as being either concrete-lined, "composite," trapezoidal, or riprap. After having crossed the Los-Angeles–Orange County border three times, Coyote Creek receives its first major tributary, the 9.8-mile (15.8 km) Brea Creek, on the right bank.

Brea Creek begins in the far northeastern corner of the watershed, at the border of Los Angeles and San Bernardino counties. The creek flows southwest, receiving numerous mountain tributaries on both banks. As it briefly turns north, it receives Tonner Canyon (also spelled Toner) on the left bank. Tonner Canyon begins in the vicinity of Brea Canyon, and flows south-southwest until it turns northwest and joins Brea. From the confluence downstream, the combined waters are called Brea Creek. The creek then proceeds to enter increasingly urbanized landscape, then flows into Brea Reservoir, which functions mainly for flood control. The creek then turns due west and flows into Coyote Creek on the left bank.

After receiving the water of Brea Creek, Coyote Creek continues southwest, passing beneath Interstate 5, while bending south for a brief stretch before turning back north. Shortly downstream from the confluence, it is joined by its North Fork, or La Canada Verde Creek. The 9.1-mile-long (14.6 km) North Fork begins in three forks, which merge and flow due south. The creek is joined by a small tributary on the left bank and then receives a larger tributary, La Mirada Creek, on the left bank. The creek then continues directly south through a flood control channel before meeting Coyote Creek. Soon after the confluence, the third major tributary, Fullerton Creek, joins Coyote on the left bank.

Fullerton Creek begins several miles south of Tonner Canyon, and initially flows west-northwest. The creek then bends sharply south and flows into Fullerton Reservoir, which, like Brea Reservoir, also serves a flood-control function. The creek then flows southwest and south, before flowing nearly at a right angle into another unnamed tributary. The creek sharply turns due west, and continues winding through predominantly residential suburbs, before flowing into Coyote on the left bank. The combined waters then continue southwest and soon flow beneath California State Route 91.

Several miles after State Route 91, a smaller tributary, Moody Creek, joins Coyote Creek on the left bank. Moody Creek begins parallel to SR 91, and flows only about 3.7 miles (6.0 km) before it joins Coyote Creek.

The fourth major tributary, the 13.6-mile (21.9 km) Carbon Creek, then joins on the left bank. Carbon Creek is a mostly-channelized course, beginning almost 10 miles (16 km) south of Brea and Tonner Canyons. The creek flows west and south into several small flood-control basins, before resuming its west-southwest course and receiving several small tributaries on either bank. The creek flows into Coyote Creek very near its mouth at the San Gabriel River, on the left bank.

== Streamflow ==
During dry weather Coyote Creek has just a trickle of water. However, on 22 January 2017, a heavy rainstorm passed through southern California. This video shows how water from the storm filled up Coyote Creek.

The United States Geological Survey (USGS) operated two stream gauges on Coyote Creek. From 1965 to 1978, the USGS recorded flows at Los Alamitos, California, which is at its confluence with the San Gabriel River. The highest flow recorded there was 14,300 cubic feet per second (400 m^{3}/s), and with three other high flows exceeding ten thousand cfs.

For Brea Creek streamflow data see Brea Creek#Streamflow.

For Fullerton Creek, the USGS operated two stream gauges from 1936 to 1964. The highest flow during that period (mouth, at Fullerton) was 1,600 cubic feet per second (45 m^{3}/s) on 14 March 1941. In that time period, no other flow passed 1,000 cfs, although it did come close to on 2 March 1938 (the peak of the Los Angeles Flood of 1938).

From 1962 to 2008, the USGS only ran one streamflow gauge for Carbon Creek, which was below Carbon Canyon Dam. The highest recorded flow during that period was 741 cubic feet (21.0 m^{3}) per second, on 19 February 2005.

== Watershed ==
=== Geography and geology ===
Coyote Creek drains a roughly diamond-shaped watershed between the drainage basins of the San Gabriel and Santa Ana rivers, bounded on the north by the small mountain ranges Chino Hills, Puente Hills and West Coyote Hills. The watershed, with the exception of these hills, a small partial divide inside the watershed, and several recreational areas, such as Chino Hills State Park, is almost entirely developed, and is in sharp contrast to the San Gabriel River watershed viewed as a whole, which in total has only twenty-six percent of its area developed.

=== Biology ===
Although channelized in many areas along its course, Coyote Creek and its tributaries provide some rich habitat for riparian and other species, including salt marsh instream, as well as coastal sage scrub, live oak, grassland and sand dunes. Native wildlife is common in the areas described, especially in the far upper reaches of the watershed, which include Brea and Tonner canyons. Aside from the native wildlife, a number of invasive species, both plant and animal, also inhabit the watershed.

== History ==
The Army Corps of Engineers expanded the channel and lined the creek with concrete beginning in the early 1960s. A young boy drowned in 1963, while playing on a makeshift raft, on the water behind a temporary dam built for the project.

== Crossings ==
From mouth to source:

- San Gabriel River Bike Trail
- East Willow Street/Katella Avenue
- I-605 - San Gabriel River Freeway
- East Spring Street/West Cerritos Avenue
- Norwalk Boulevard/Los Alamitos Boulevard
- Wardlow Road
- Lincoln Avenue
- Centralia Street
- Railroad (West Santa Ana Branch, disused)
- Del Amo Boulevard/La Palma Avenue
- Carmenita Road/Moody Street
- South Street/Orangethorpe Avenue
- SR 91 - Artesia Freeway
- Walker Street
- Valley View Street
- Artesia Boulevard
- Railroad
- Firestone Boulevard (frontage road on southwest side of I-5)
- I-5 - Santa Ana Freeway
- Firestone Boulevard (frontage road on northeast side of I-5)
- Knott Avenue
- Railroad (Union Pacific)
- Stage Road
- CR N8 - La Mirada Boulevard
- Pedestrian bridge connecting to Coyote Creek bicycle path
- Rosecrans Avenue
- Pedestrian bridge between Alicante Road and the Coyote Creek bicycle path
- Hillsborough Drive
- Imperial Highway
- SR 39 - Beach Boulevard
- Fashion Square Lane
- South Idaho Street
- West Lambert Road
- South Monte Vista Street
- South Walnut Street
- Euclid Street
- South Cypress Street
- Railroad
- South Harbor Boulevard
- Two railroads

== See also ==
- Coyote Creek bicycle path
- List of rivers of California
- List of rivers of Orange County, California
