= Anaheim Bay =

Harbor and wetland complex in California, United States

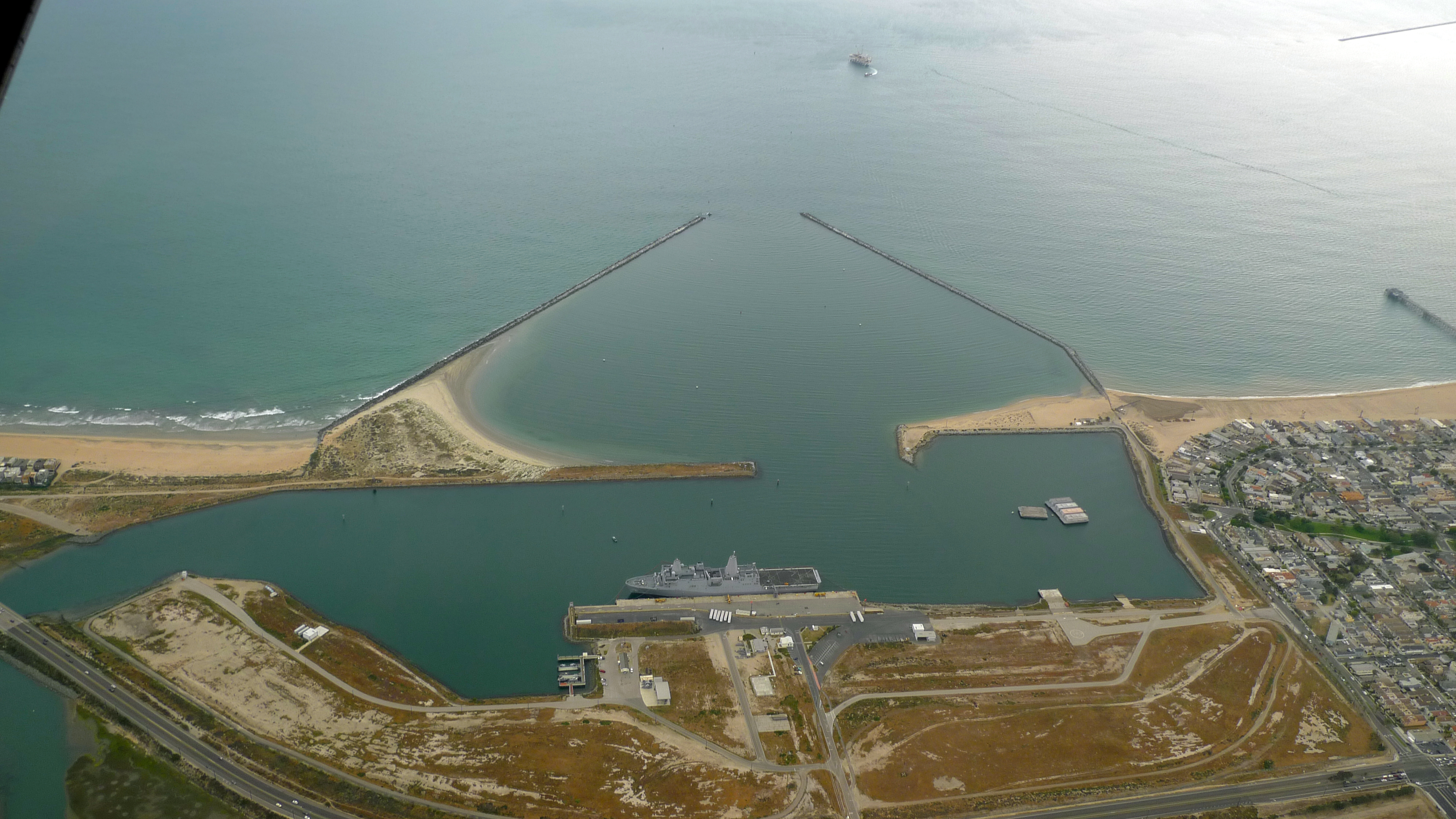
- Aerial view of the Anaheim Bay entrance, showing the inner harbor in front center and the outer harbor directly beyond (between the jetties). Huntington Harbor is off to the left (southeast). City of Seal Beach and Seal Beach Pier are visible to the right.

- Location within California
- Location: Orange County, California
- Coordinates: 33.735°N 118.094°W
- Primary outflows: Pacific Ocean
- Max. depth: 43 ft (13 m)

Anaheim Bay is an extensive harbor and wetland complex in Orange County, California in the United States. The bay is located on the Pacific Ocean coast of northwestern Orange County next to Seal Beach and is split into several distinct but interconnected parts. The term "Anaheim Bay" generally refers to the deep-water Navy harbor at the bay entrance. Further southeast are the Huntington Harbor, which serves small private vessels, and the Bolsa Bay, a salt-water estuary. Bordering the bay are hundreds of acres of salt marshes, some of the largest remaining such habitats in Southern California.

== Geography and features ==
The Anaheim Bay entrance is located at the westernmost corner of Orange County near the Los Angeles County line. The bay and its associated harbors and wetlands extend southeast along the coast for a distance of some 7 miles (11 km) from Seal Beach towards Huntington Beach; they are protected by a long peninsular barrier beach where Surfside, Sunset Beach and Bolsa Chica State Beach are situated. Los Alamitos Army Airfield and Naval Weapons Station Seal Beach are located adjacent to each other on the north and north-east sides of the bay, respectively.

=== Harbors ===
The bay is divided into an outer and inner deep water harbor. The triangular, 94-acre (38 ha) outer harbor is man-made, protected by two converging rubble breakwaters and maintained to a depth of 43 feet (13 m). The west breakwater has a length of 3,500 feet (1,100 m) and the east breakwater is 3,950 feet (1,200 m). The 96 acres (39 ha) inner harbor is natural but dredged to maintain a minimum depth of 13 feet (4.0 m). The two harbors are connected by a channel 436 feet (133 m) wide and 43 feet (13 m) deep.

To the southeast is long, narrow Huntington Harbor, a residential marina of 153 acres (62 ha). Once a shallow tidal lagoon, Huntington Harbor is now dredged to a depth of 11 feet (3.4 m) to provide passage for small boats. It is connected to the inner deep water harbor by a channel 164 feet (50 m) wide and 13 feet (4.0 m) deep.

=== Wetlands ===
To the north of Anaheim Bay is the Anaheim Salt Marsh in the Seal Beach National Wildlife Refuge, which consists of over 800 acres (320 ha) of predominantly salt marshes connected by tidal channels to the bay. About 131 acres (53 ha) of this is open water at high tide. The salt marsh also encloses Hog Island, the only significant natural island in the bay complex. The larger NASA Island was created for rocket testing in the mid-1960s. The islands now provide 65 acres (26 ha) of upland habitat, or the only permanently dry land within the refuge. Being located within the naval base, public access to the wildlife refuge is highly restricted.

Connected to the southeast end of Huntington Harbor is Bolsa Bay, which has retained many of its original wetlands. The Bolsa Chica wetlands are the largest remaining coastal wetlands in California between Monterey Bay and the mouth of the Tijuana River, with 1,449 acres (586 ha) of salt flats, lagoons and tidal streams. A set of floodgates regulates the water level between Bolsa Bay and Huntington Harbor. While Bolsa Bay was once a separate body of water, its ocean outlet silted up in the early 1900s after a man-made channel was cut to link it to Anaheim Bay. In the early 21st century the bay's original outlet was re-established, restoring full tidal influence in order to benefit the local ecosystem.

=== Waterways ===
The San Gabriel River, which drains an extensive watershed in both Orange and Los Angeles Counties, empties into the sea less than a mile (1.6 km) to the west of Anaheim Bay. The Santa Ana River mouth is situated 11 miles (18 km) to the southeast. Several smaller streams, today mostly channelized for flood control, drain a 75-square-mile (190 km^{2}) watershed emptying directly into the bay.

The Anaheim-Barber City Channel (also known as the Bolsa Chica Channel), 8.65 miles (13.92 km) long, begins in Anaheim and flows through Stanton, Garden Grove, Westminster and Seal Beach before emptying into the north end of the Anaheim Bay Marsh. The 7.91-mile (12.73 km) Westminster Channel drains parts of Garden Grove, Westminster, Huntington Beach and Seal Beach and joins with the Anaheim–Barber City Channel shortly above the mouth. The East Garden Grove-Wintersburg Channel, longest of the three at 11.59 miles (18.65 km), empties into Bolsa Bay.

== Geology ==
Anaheim Bay is located at the mouth of Sunset Gap, one of the many breaks in the low hills and mesas that make up the Orange County coast. The gaps were formed by erosion about 40,000 years ago during the previous Ice Age, when the sea level was lower and rivers entrenched valleys into the coastal plain. When sea levels rose following the glacial melt at the end of the Pleistocene, the valleys or gaps were backfilled by sea water and became bays.

The area is located within the historic floodplain of the San Gabriel and Santa Ana Rivers, whose mouths are located to the north and south of the bay, respectively. Before urbanization in the 20th century, which largely confined these streams to concrete flood control channels, they frequently changed course and filled the coastal bays with varying amounts of alluvial sediment. Neither river flows into the bay at present, but sediment deposits ranging from 35 to 40 feet (11 to 12 m) thick indicate that one or both did so in the past.

== History ==
In its natural state, Anaheim Bay was the outlet for a vast expanse of estuarine salt marshes that stretched across what is now southeastern Los Angeles County and western Orange County. The Anaheim Bay marshes covered more than 5,000 acres (2,000 ha) and the Bolsa Chica marshes covered a further 2,300 acres (930 ha), although the extent of these wetlands was likely much greater and varied with the seasonal flooding on the San Gabriel and Santa Ana rivers and smaller streams that flowed into the bay. Sheltered by a long chain of natural barrier beaches and hills, the marshes were a vast complex of ponds, streams and bogs interspersed with meadows and riparian forests. Anaheim and Bolsa Chica bays were separate bodies of water at the time with distinct ocean outlets; they were not linked until the creation of a man-made channel in 1899.

The wetlands of Anaheim Bay were abundant with fish and large mammals, ranging from coyote to grizzly bears. This made it an attractive place for early Native Americans to settle. Estimates for the first human presence at the bay range from 500 to 38,000 BC, although Hokan-speaking people are generally believed to be the earliest inhabitants, present between 6000 and 3500 BC.

As one of the few safe natural anchorages along the Southern California coast, Anaheim Bay has been an important strategic position in Orange County since at least the mid-1800s. During the Mexican–American War, Commodore Robert F. Stockton repulsed an attempted landing by a French ship carrying supplies for the Mexicans. During the American Civil War a Union artillery base was established here to defend the harbor against the Confederates.

The Anaheim Lighter Company was established in 1868 with a 20-year concession, to operate Anaheim Harbor as a port. Cargo was delivered to the harbor from as far away as San Bernardino, California, Yuma, Arizona and Salt Lake City, Utah.

In the Great Flood of 1862, the Santa Ana River flooded massively, and as a result "captured" several of the streams flowing into Anaheim Bay. Starved of much of its fresh water input, the bay gradually increased in salinity and the wetland area decreased. Between 1854 and 1949 the bay lost 30 percent of its area largely as a result of sedimentation and the decreased fresh water runoff available to flush it out. However, many of these streams were redirected into the bay in 1964 following the construction of the Santa Ana River Mainstem Project, which channelized the part of the Santa Ana in Orange County to prevent flooding. The purpose was to reduce the total amount of water flowing into the Santa Ana, reducing its flood crests, but an unintended benefit was the restoration of the bay's natural fresh water source.

In 1895, a group of Los Angeles businessmen organized the Bolsa Chica Gun Club, which purchased the Bolsa Chica marsh from the State of California for $59,991. The Gun Club worked to transform the marsh lands into a duck hunting area. They constructed dikes to create freshwater ponds; the resultant change in currents caused the natural outlet of Bolsa Chica Bay to become blocked by sediment. A new channel was dug to link Bolsa Chica Bay with Anaheim Bay, transforming the two bays into one continuous body of water. A dam was then built across the channel to raise the fresh water level in Bolsa Chica and prevent salt water intrusion from Anaheim Bay.

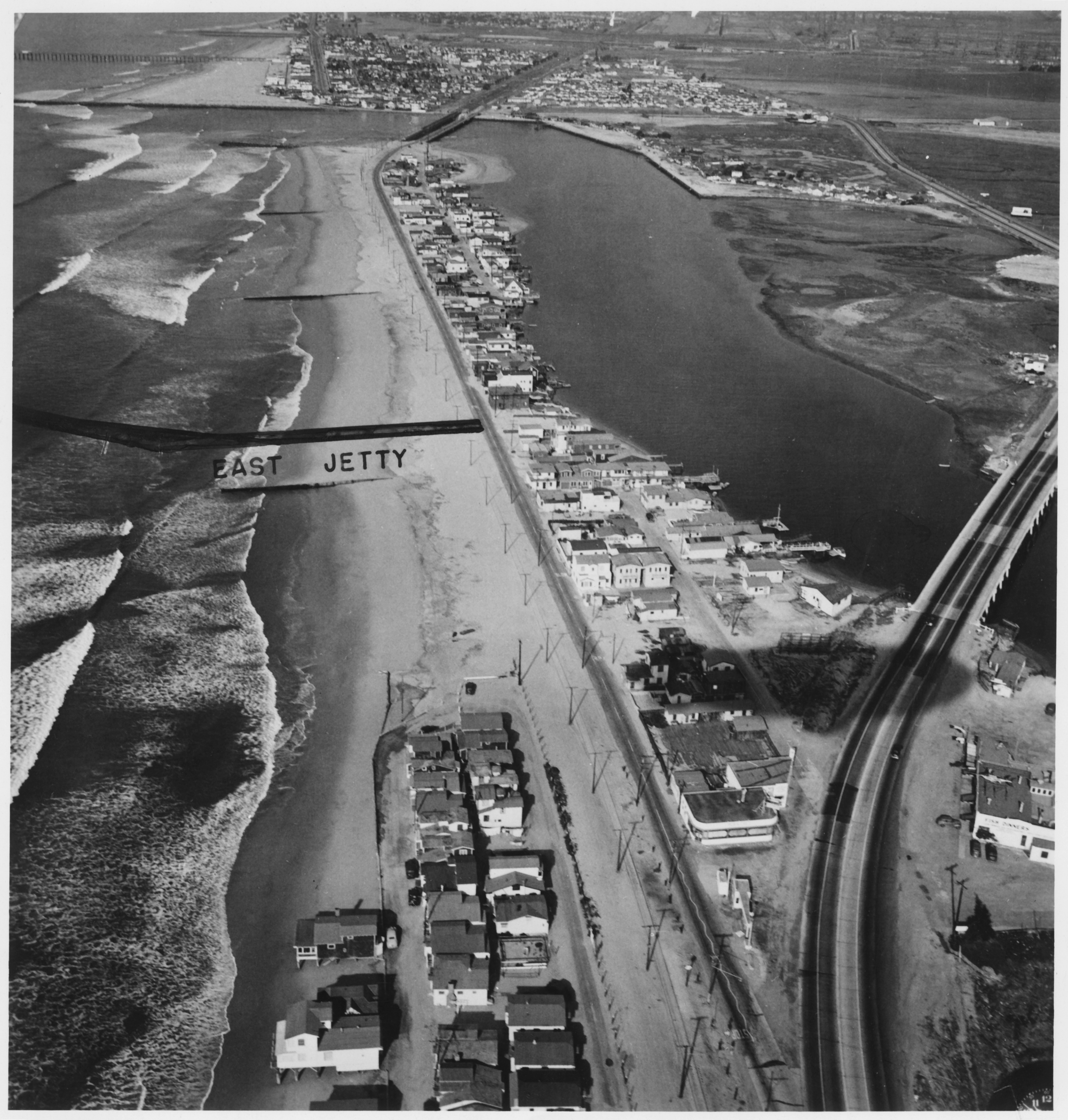
Aerial view of the jetty and coastline before the bay was widened

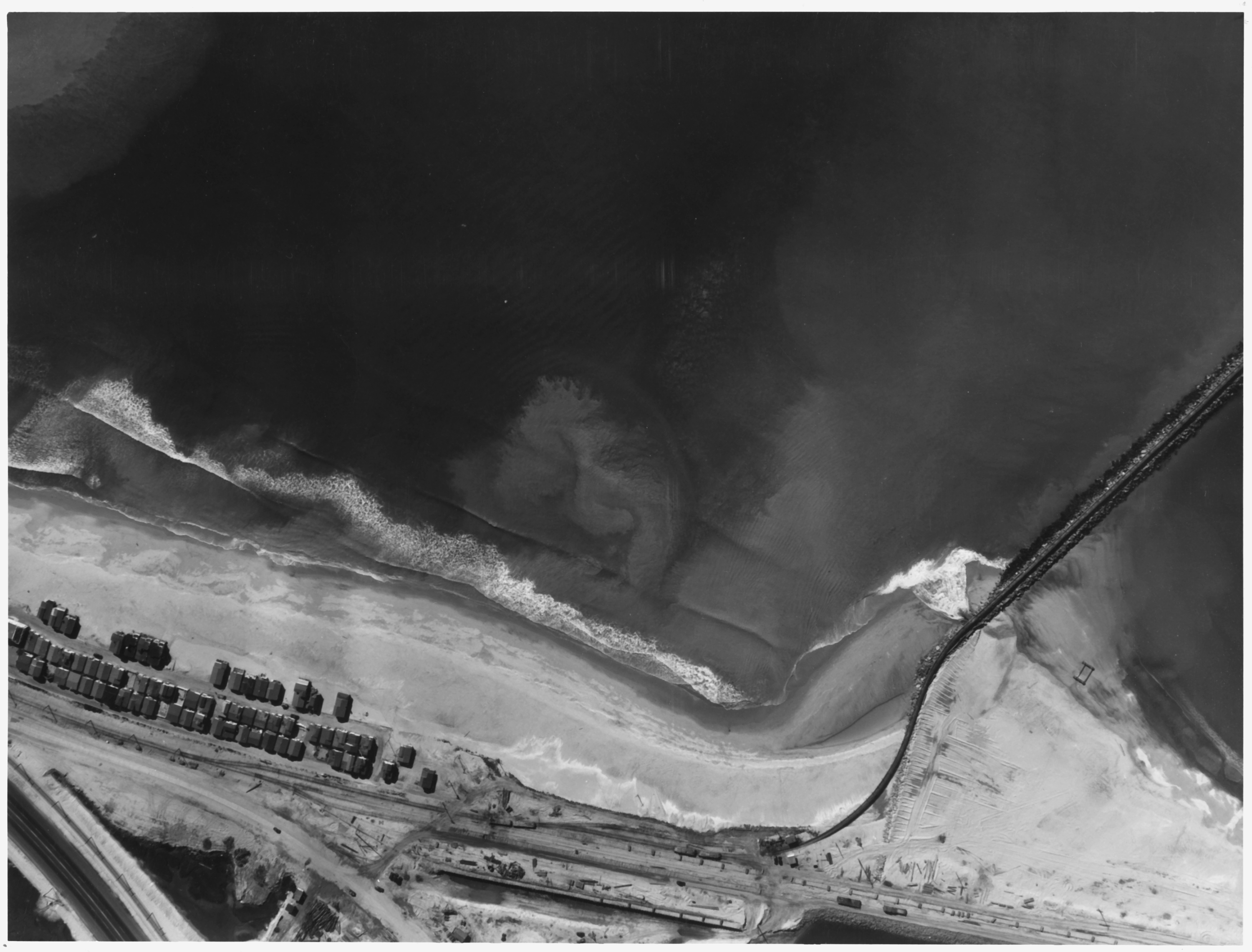
Aerial view showing jetty jutting into ocean and coastline

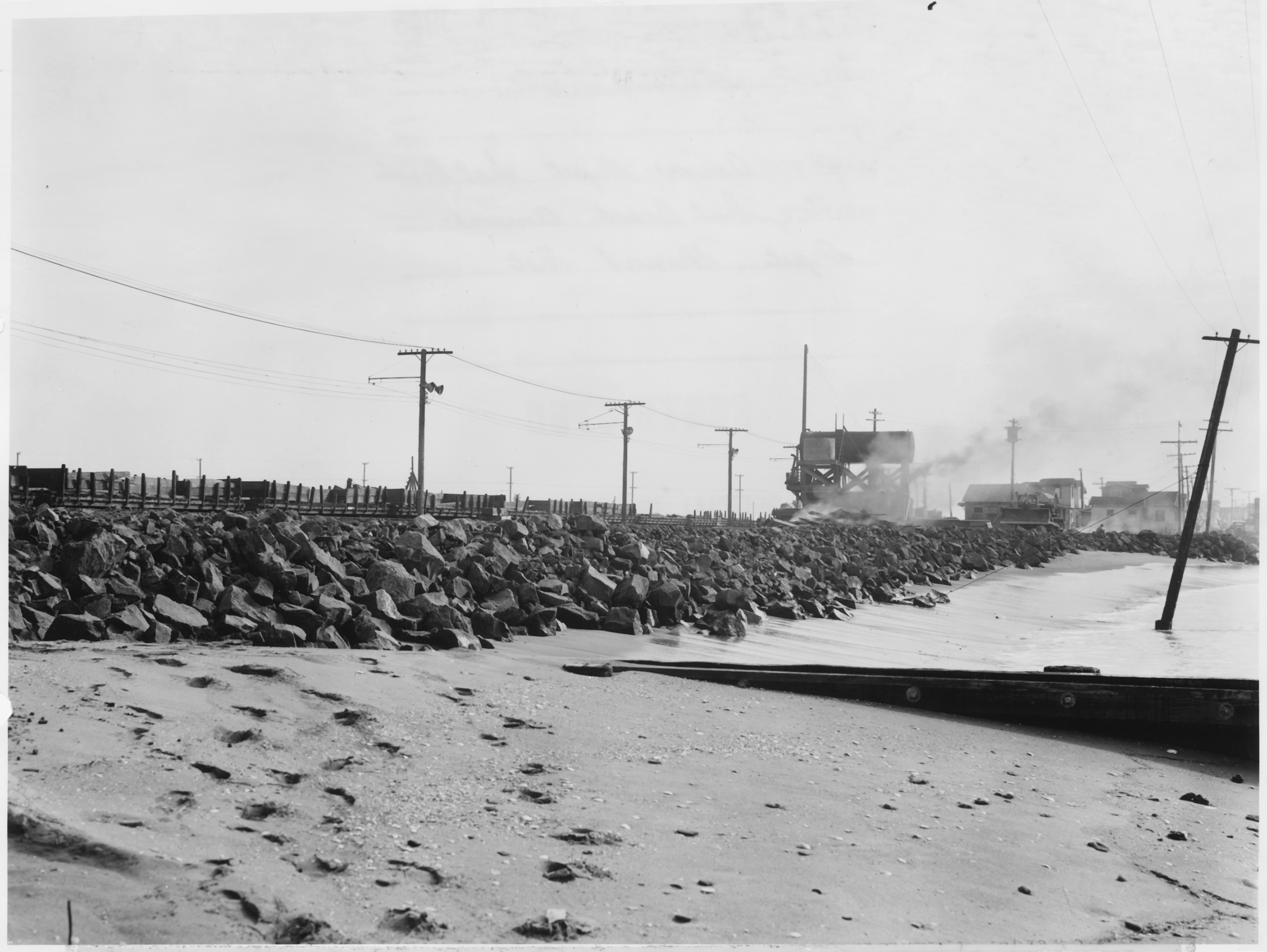
Erosion control on jetty, c. 1917-1947

The entrance of the bay was widened by the U.S. Navy in 1944 and breakwaters constructed in order to serve Naval Air Station Los Alamitos. In 1990 a $150 million proposal by the Navy was proposed to add a third jetty to the bay mouth, in order to separate the entrances for military vessels and pleasure craft. However the project was not implemented, in part due to fears that it would impact surf and cause harmful erosion to the local beaches.

A modernization project began in 2019 that included dredging the turning basin in order to accommodate amphibious assault ships that are currently resupplied by helicopters off Marine Corps Air Station Camp Pendleton.

== Environmental issues ==
The U.S. Environmental Protection Agency lists Anaheim Bay as an impaired waterbody, with high concentrations of dieldrin, nickel, PCBs and sediment toxicity. Huntington Harbor is also contaminated by chlordane, copper, lead, nickel, and PCBs. Urban runoff has also introduced high concentrations of pathogens such as E.coli into the bay.

== See also ==
- List of rivers of Orange County, California
