= Emerald Canyon =

- Location of Emerald Canyon in California

Location
- Country: United States
- State: California

Physical characteristics
- Source: San Joaquin Hills
  - coordinates: 33°35′34″N 117°46′49″W
  - elevation: 955 ft (291 m)
- Mouth: Pacific Ocean
  - location: Emerald Bay, Laguna Beach
  - coordinates: 33°33′04″N 117°48′28″W
  - elevation: 0 ft (0 m)
- Length: 3.46 mi (5.57 km)

Emerald Canyon is a canyon and watercourse in Laguna Beach, Orange County, California, which drains a section of the San Joaquin Hills 1.5 miles (2.4 km) northwest of central Laguna Beach. Emerald Canyon Creek, about 3 miles (4.8 km) long, originates at the summit of the range near SR 73 (the San Joaquin Hills Toll Road) and flows southwest under the Pacific Coast Highway into Emerald Bay.

The canyon is located inside Laguna Coast Wilderness Park, and has trails for hiking and mountain biking. However, it is only accessible from the north (uphill) end, as the lower part terminates in private property. A point of interest in the canyon is the 20-foot (6.1 m) high Emerald Canyon Falls, which only flows after periods of heavy rain.

Emerald Canyon has been historically known as Mayate Canyon and Nigger Canyon.

== See also ==
- List of rivers of Orange County, California
