= San Diego Bay National Wildlife Refuge =

National Wildlife Refuge in California

Coordinates: 32°36′12.39″N 117°07′24.29″W

- IUCN category IV (habitat/species management area)
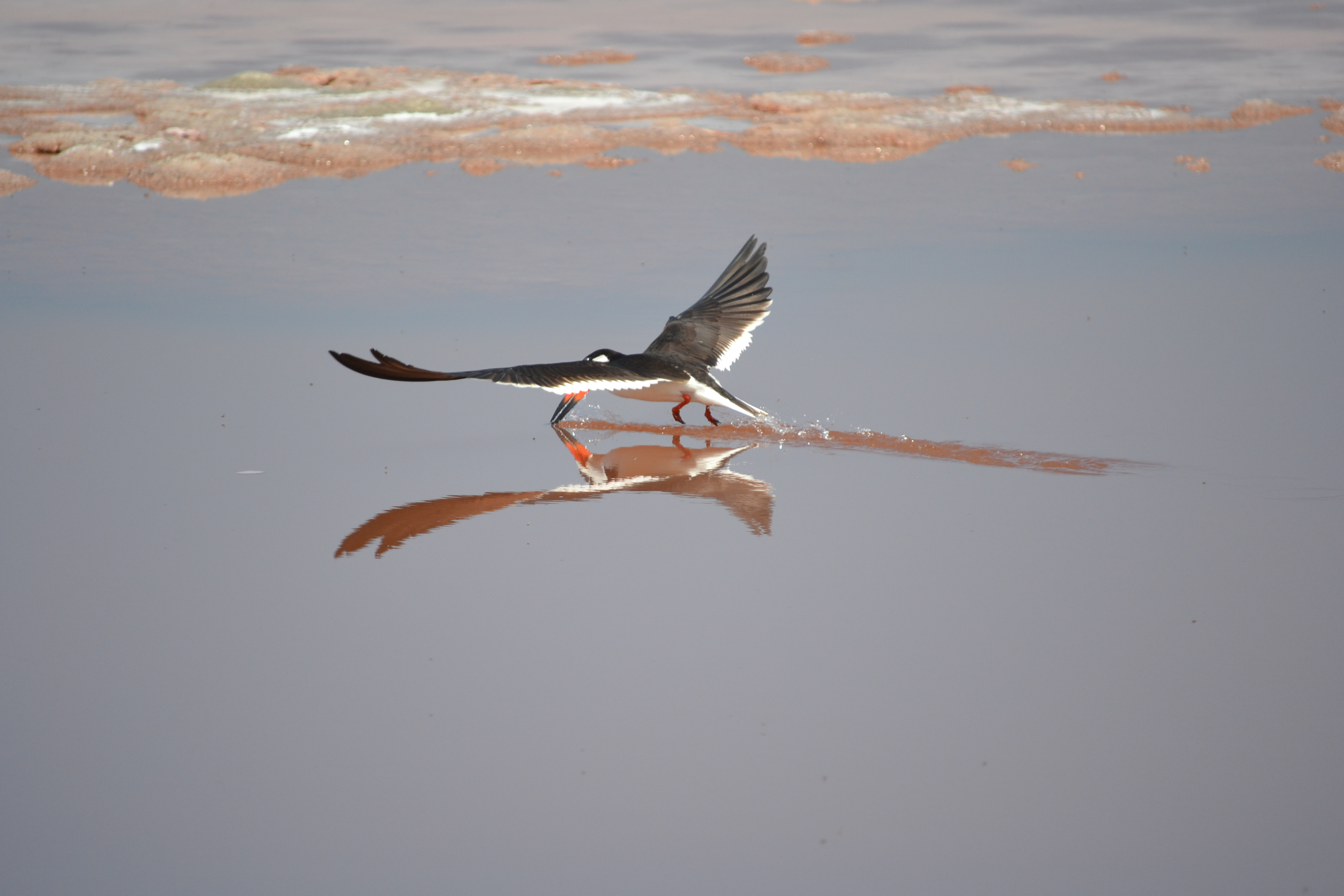

- Location within the United States
- Location: San Diego County, California, United States
- Nearest city: San Diego, California
- Governing body: U.S. Fish and Wildlife Service
- Website: San Diego Bay National Wildlife Refuge

San Diego Bay National Wildlife Refuge is an urban refuge located on San Diego Bay in San Diego County, California. It is part of the San Diego National Wildlife Refuge Complex and hosts its headquarters. The refuge was established in 1988.

The refuge, comprising 316 acres (1.28 km^{2}) of salt marsh and coastal uplands surrounded by urban development, is a critically important area for wildlife because over 90 percent of the historic wetlands of San Diego Bay have been filled in, drained, or diked.

The refuge works to preserve and restore the remaining wetlands, mudflats and eelgrass beds to ensure that the bay's thousands of migrating and resident shorebirds and waterfowl will survive into the next century. The approved refuge boundary is 2,620 acres (10.6 km^{2}).

== History ==
The 316-acre (1.28 km^{2}) Sweetwater Marsh Unit was established in 1988 on the east side of San Diego Bay. The area was first used by the Kumeyaay people for fishing, hunting and gathering. From 1916 to 1920, the site was home to a 30-acre (0.12 km^{2}) kelp-processing plant belonging to the Hercules Powder Company which produced acetone and potash. The 2,300-acre (9.3 km^{2}) South San Diego Bay Unit was dedicated in 1999.

== Climate ==
San Diego has a year-round mild Mediterranean climate. Temperature usually ranges from 60-70 degrees Fahrenheit. Occasionally, dry easterly winds bring warm temperatures. Fog is often found in this area in the Autumn and Winter months. The average seasonal rainfall is about 10 inches (25 cm).

Global warming poses many risks to San Diego Bay. Global warming may increase the severity of droughts, as well as the likelihood of wildfires. By 2100, the sea level around San Diego’s coast is expected to rise by 1.6–3.2 feet (0.49–0.98 m).

== Ecology ==
Sweetwater Marsh provides habitat for multiple endangered or threatened species, including light-footed rail, the Belding’s savannah sparrow and the California least tern, as well as endangered plants such as the salt marsh bird’s beak. The refuge is the site of a very successful breeding program for the light-footed Ridgway’s rail. It is also the only place in the United States where yerba reuma, a member of the heath family, grows naturally. More than 200 species of birds have been recorded on the refuge.

The South Bay Unit’s shallow subtidal habitat supports a group of twelve species of fish that are indigenous to the bays and estuaries of the Southern California Bight.

== Geology ==
The refuge is located on historic coastal salt marsh and intertidal mudflats, closely bordered by a highly urbanized area. The refuge focuses on the restoration of tidal flats, salt marsh, subtidal, and native upland habitats. The underlying rock formations of San Diego Bay are mostly sedimentary.
