= Carbon Canyon (Malibu, California) =

Santa Monica Mountains landform

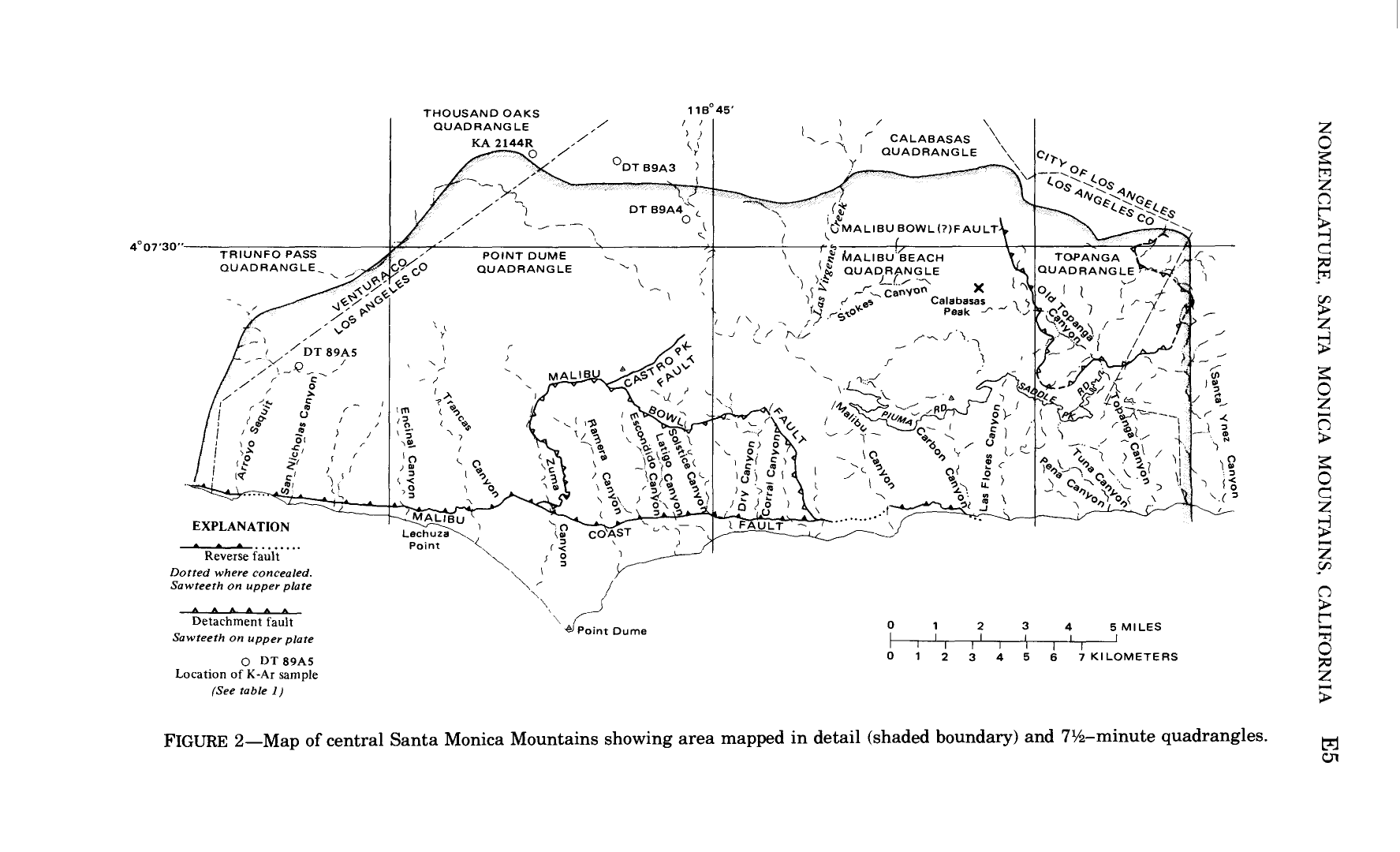
Map of central Santa Monica Mountains

Carbon Canyon is a landform in the Santa Monica Mountains of California in the United States. Carbon Canyon Open Space was added as part of the Santa Monica Mountains National Recreation Area in 2020. Carbon Beach, sometimes called Billionaire's Beach, lies along the Pacific Ocean at the west end of the canyon. Carbon Canyon marked the border of one of the first residential subdivisions in the Malibu region, established by May Rindge around 1926.
