= Tick Creek =

Stream in the U.S. state of Missouri

Tick Creek is a tributary of the Gasconade River in northwestern Phelps County in the Ozarks of Missouri.

The stream headwaters are approximately four miles west of Rolla at 37°57′29″N 91°51′09″W. The stream flows west passing north of Doolittle then turns north and on to its confluence with the Gasconade on the Phelps-Maries county line at 38°02′08″N 91°55′24″W.

Tick Creek most likely was so named due to the reported abundance of ticks in the area.

== See also ==
- List of rivers of Missouri
