= Multiple Species Conservation Program =

The Multiple Species Conservation Program (MSCP) is a environmental organization based in San Diego County, California, that aims to preserve a network of habitat and open space, protecting biodiversity and enhancing the region's quality of life.

The City of San Diego is one of several jurisdictions participating in the MSCP. The city has completed the planning effort to identify core biological resource areas targeted for conservation and has entered into an agreement with the federal and state wildlife agencies to ensure implementation of the resource conservation plan and habitat preserve. Current efforts of city MSCP staff largely focus on project review, preserve assembly, and biological monitoring.
