= Pickleweed =

Pickleweed is a common name used for two unrelated genera of flowering plants:

- Batis, family Bataceae
- Salicornia, family Amaranthaceae
