= Fullerton Creek =

Tributary of the San Gabriel River in California

Coordinates: 33°51′50″N 118°02′12″W

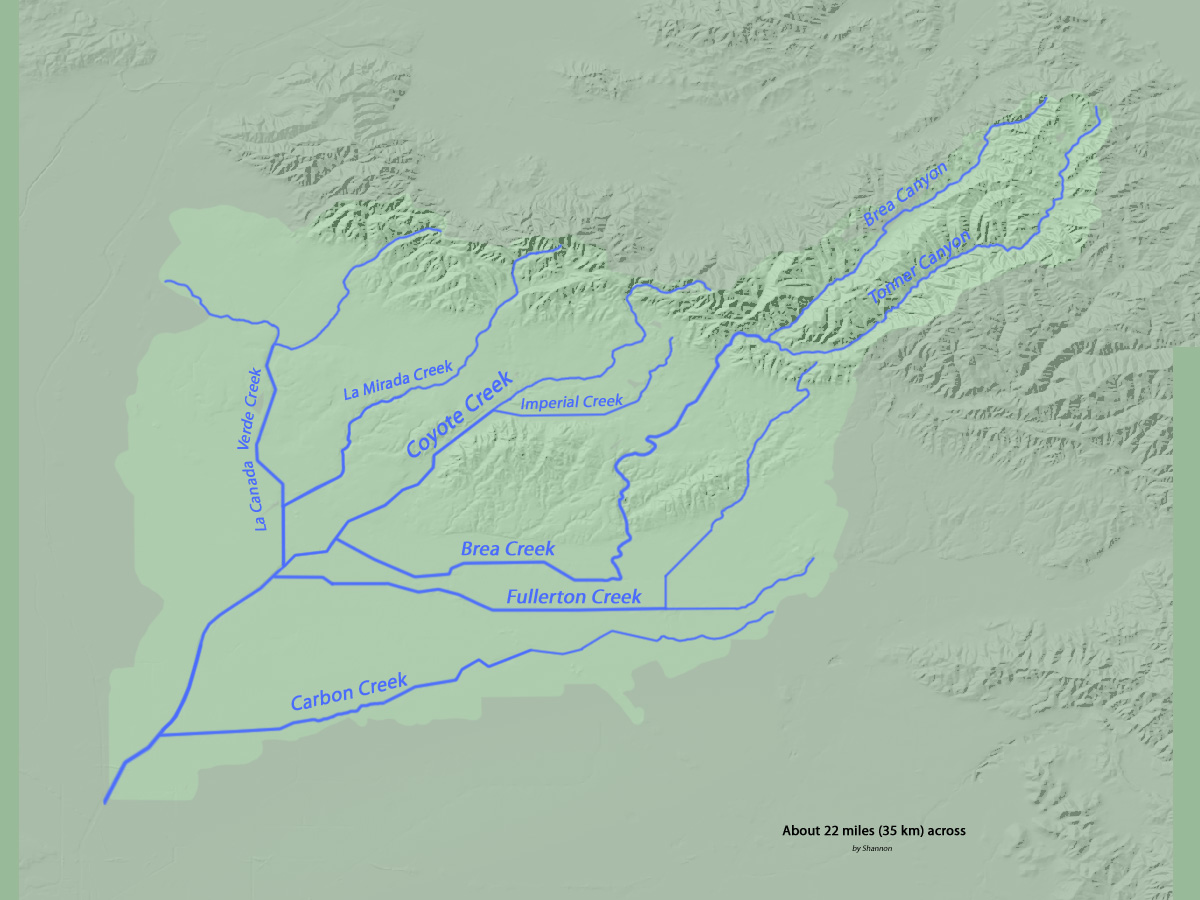

Location
- Country: United States
- States: California

Fullerton Creek is a tributary of Coyote Creek, which is a lower tributary of the San Gabriel River. The San Gabriel River is found in northwest Orange County, southeast Los Angeles County, and southwest Riverside County in the U.S. state of California.

The creek is approximately ten and a half miles (16.9 km) long from the Fullerton Dam to Coyote Creek. Knott Avenue runs over Fullerton Creek on a small concrete bridge built in 1950. For Fullerton Creek, the USGS operated two stream gauges from 1936 to 1964. The highest flow during that period (mouth, at Fullerton) was 1,600 cubic feet per second (45 m^{3}/s) on 14 March 1941. In that time period, no other flow passed 1,000 second-feet, although it did come close to on 2 March 1938 (the peak of the Los Angeles Flood of 1938). The creek was originally a natural stream that flowed from Puente Hills in a southwestern direction toward the southeastern borders of the city of Fullerton. Agricultural development in the 20th century helped shape its current alignment. There is a seven-acre (2.8 ha) greenbelt built around a short segment of Fullerton Creek that opened in 1974.
