= Naval Weapons Station Seal Beach =

US Navy installation in Seal Beach, California, US

- Seal Beach, California in the United States
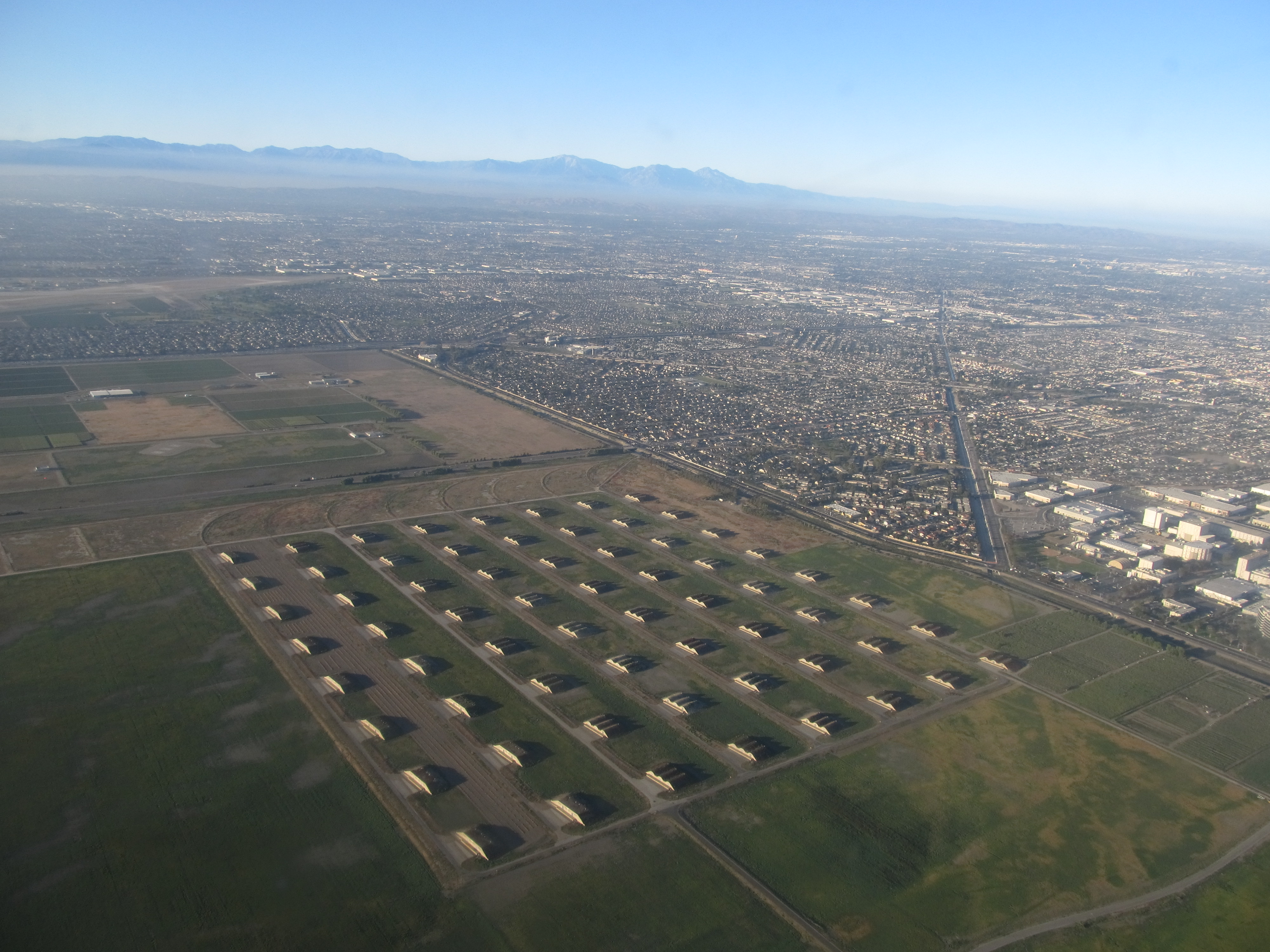
- An aerial view of Naval Weapons Station Seal Beach munitions loading, storage and maintenance facility

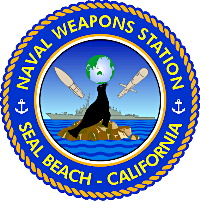

Site information
- Type: Naval base
- Owner: Department of Defense
- Operator: US Navy
- Controlled by: Navy Region Southwest
- Condition: Operational
- Website: Official website

Location
- Coordinates: 33°45′N 118°4′W

Naval Weapons Station Seal Beach is a United States Navy weapons and munitions loading, storage, and maintenance facility located in Seal Beach, California, with detachments in Fallbrook and Norco, both also in California. It also encloses the Anaheim Bay and Seal Beach National Wildlife Refuge.

== Location and infrastructure ==
NWS Seal Beach occupies 5,256 acres (2,127 ha) and has 230 buildings and 128 ammunition depots providing 589,299 square feet (54,747.7 m^{2}) of ammunition storage space. Ammunition was moved from storage to the docks on 56 miles (90 km) of railroad line; the tracks closed in 2008 and were taken out in 2010, after which 80 miles (130 km) of road were used instead. The base owned 130 pieces of railroad rolling stock which were dismantled, their function being taken up by 230 trucks and trailers to move the ammunition, which is loaded onto ships using six mobile cranes that can lift up to 90 short tons (82 t).

The station is bounded on the north by the combined Interstate 405 and State Route 22, on the west by Seal Beach Boulevard, on the southwest by the Pacific Ocean, on the southeast by the Bolsa Chica Channel and Edinger Avenue, and on the east by the Bolsa Chica Channel and Bolsa Chica Road. From Edinger Avenue to Interstate 405, a distance of about three miles, all roads to the east of the station terminate at Bolsa Chica Road, with the exception of Westminster Boulevard, which runs through the center of the facility, separated by a chain-link fence on both sides. Edinger Avenue enters the facility, but public access terminates at an emergency gate. On the west side of the station south of Interstate 405, Westminster Boulevard and the Pacific Coast Highway are the only public roads running through any part of the station.

In 2024, a new ammunition pier was installed that allowed for larger ships such as the USS Paul Hamilton and USS Tripoli to dock at Seal Beach,

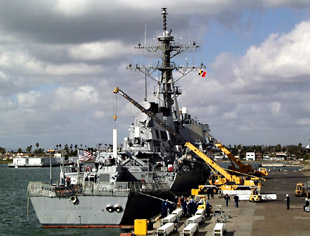
Loading munitions from the wharf

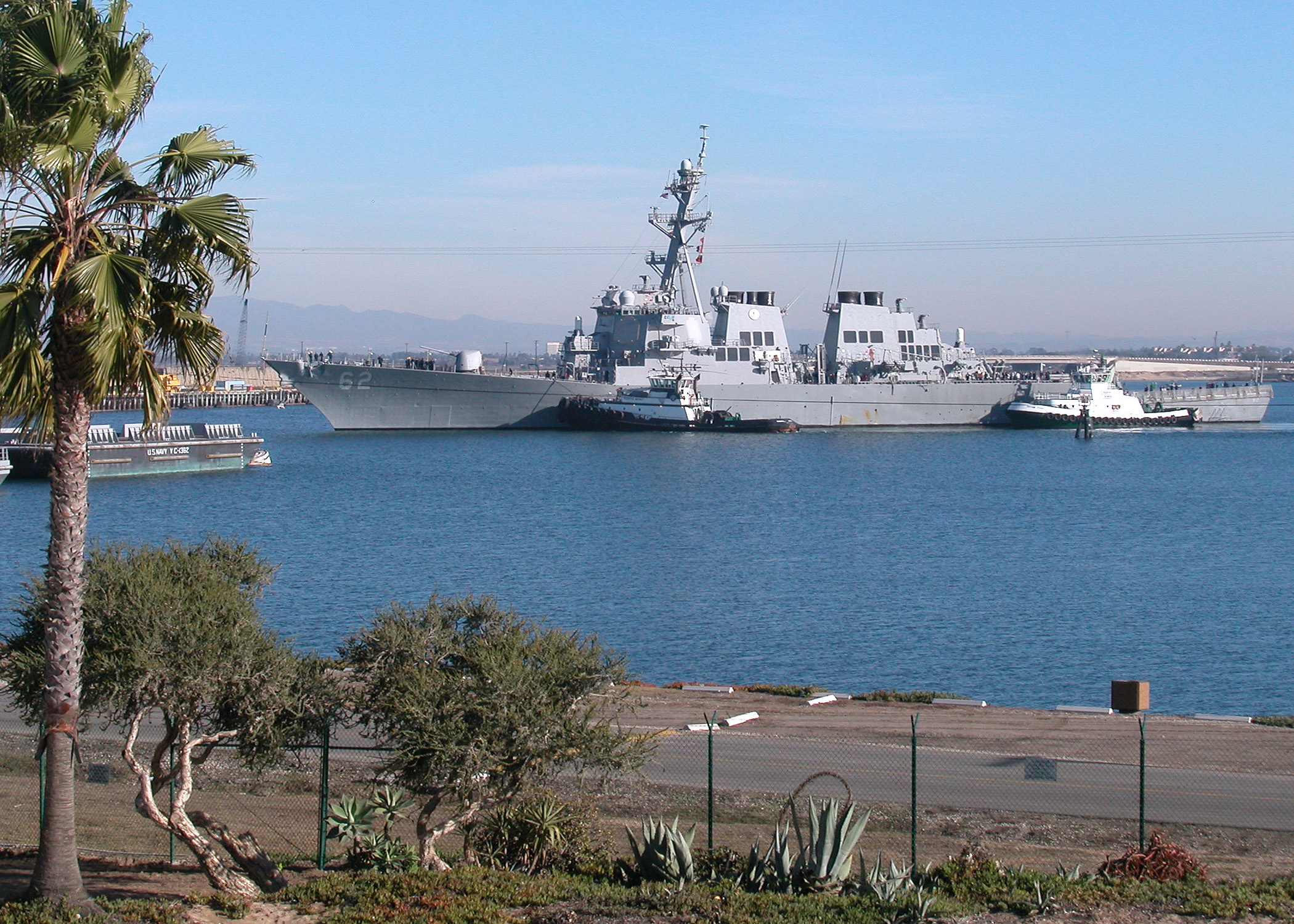
The Arleigh Burke-class guided missile destroyer USS Fitzgerald (DDG 62) arrives at Naval Weapons Station (NWS) Seal Beach, to onload ammunitions, 2003

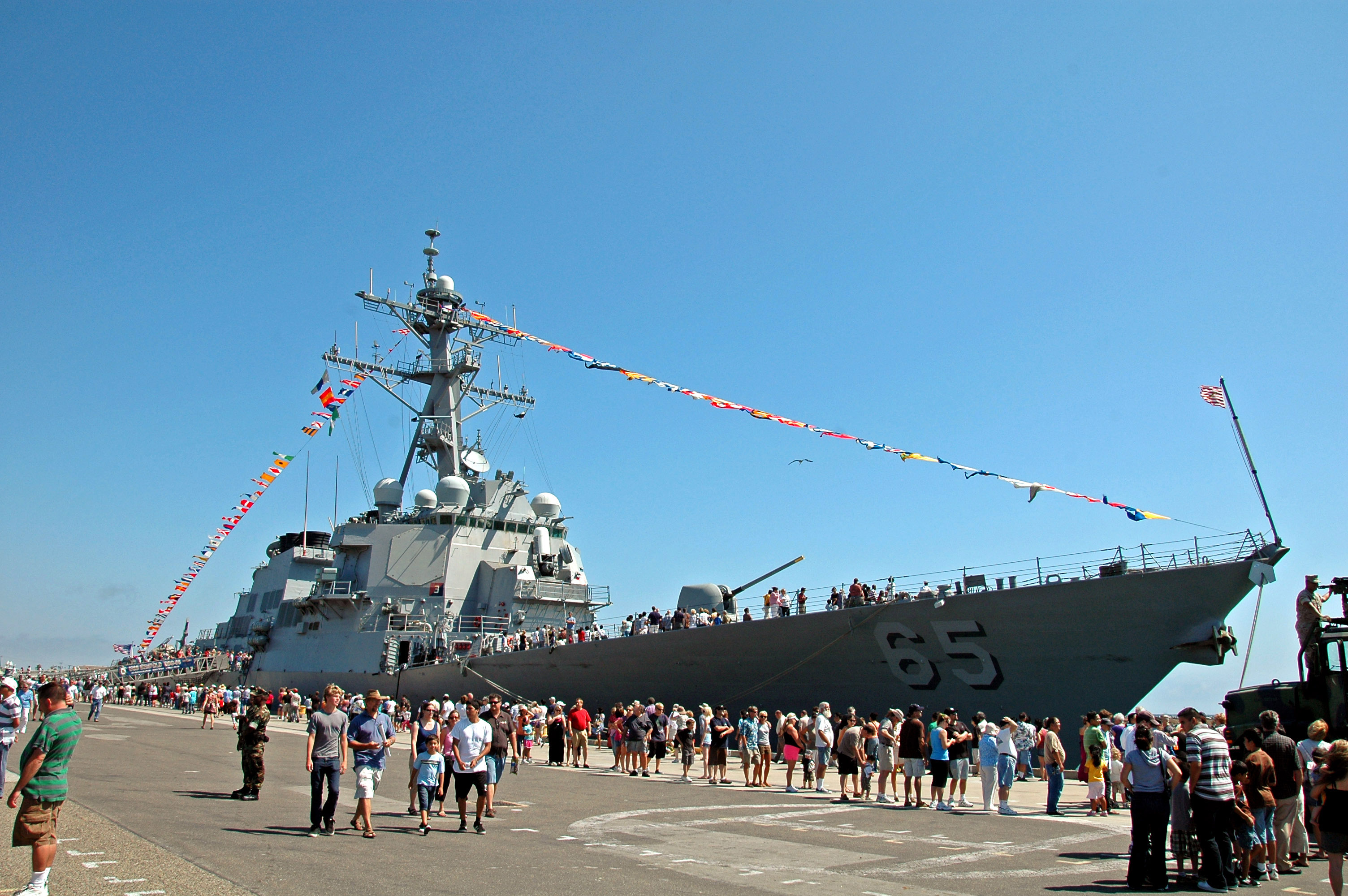
Visitors wait in line to tour the guided-missile destroyer USS Benfold (DDG 65) at the Naval Weapons Station Seal Beach wharf, 2009

== Memorial ==
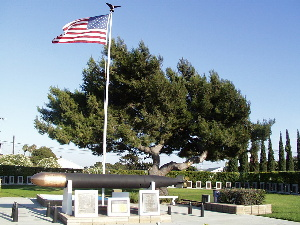
World War II Submarine Memorial

The Weapons Station is also home to the World War II National Submarine Memorial – West. The Memorial is dedicated to the over 3000 submariners who lost their lives in United States submarines in the 52 submarines lost during World War II. There are also plaques dedicated to those who lost their lives in submarine accidents during the Cold War. The Memorial is located outside the main entrance to the Weapons Station on Seal Beach Boulevard and is accessible to the public.

== Environment ==
The Seal Beach National Wildlife Refuge is a 920-acre (370 ha) salt marsh located within the boundaries of the Weapons Station.

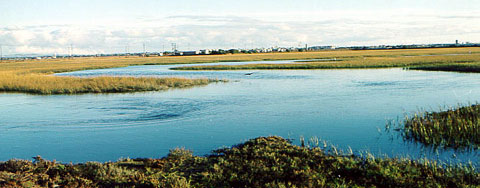
Marsh wetlands of the Wildlife Refuge.

An Installation Restoration (IR) project is underway at the base to clean up environmental hazards and restore damaged areas. Working with a Restoration Advisory Board made up of representatives from the surrounding community, a total of 73 sites needing attention were identified. Studies of the recommended sites were done and 46 were found to have no contamination and required no intervention. Five facilities were permitted and are still in use and were removed from the IR program. As of September 2005 responsibility for two underground tanks was transferred to other agencies with expertise in such tanks. Seven sites have had the cleanup process completed with 13 other sites in the process of analysis or cleanup. The remaining 13 sites range from the station landfill to a paint locker to an explosives burning ground.

== See also ==
- Joint Forces Training Base – Los Alamitos
