= Carbon Canyon Dam =

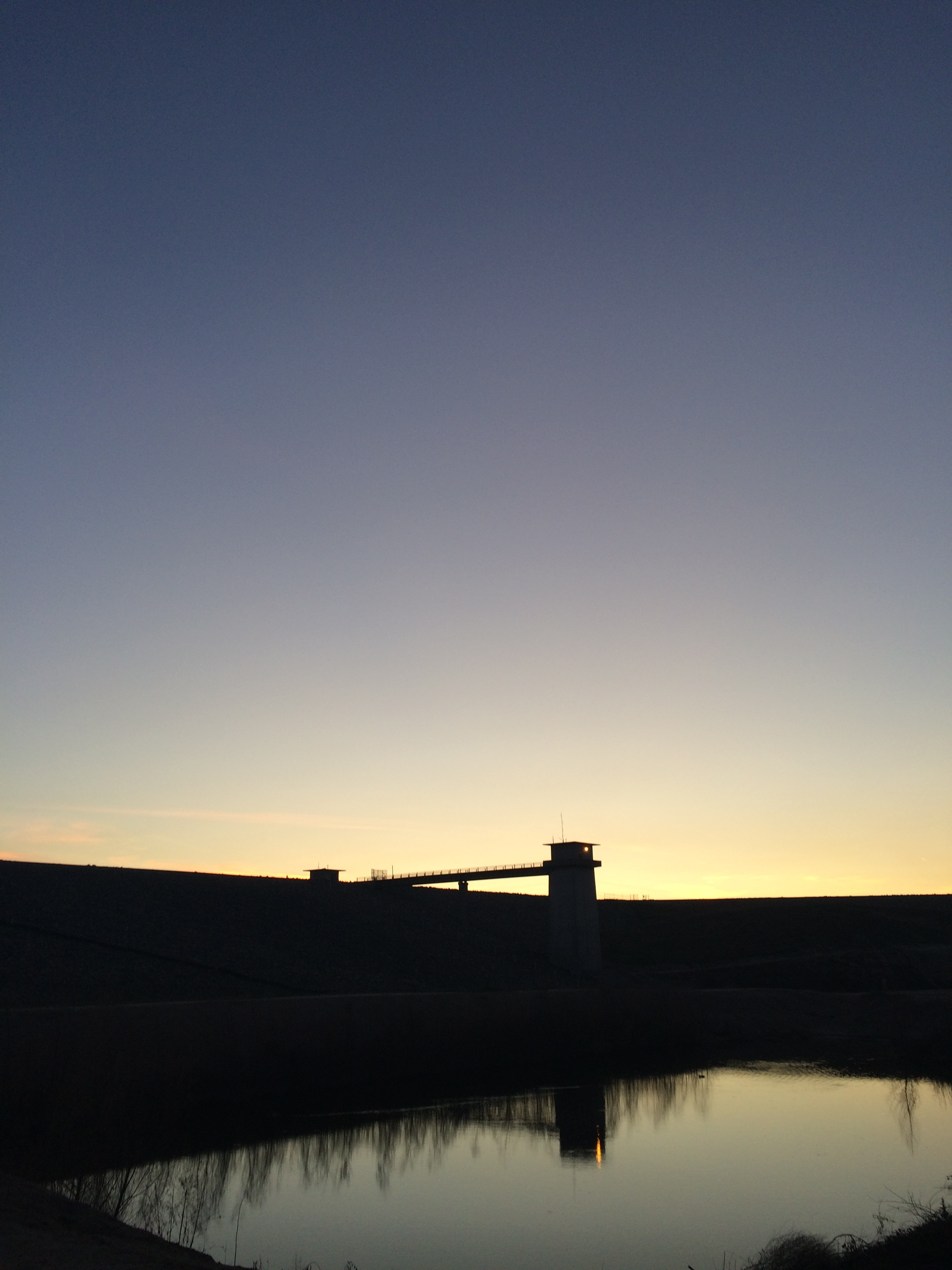
- Interactive map of Carbon Canyon Dam
- Country: United States
- Location: Orange County, California
- Coordinates: 33°54′49″N 117°50′21″W
- Construction began: 1959; 67 years ago
- Opening date: 1961; 65 years ago
- Owners: U.S. Army Corps of Engineers, Los Angeles District

Dam and spillways
- Type of dam: Earth
- Impounds: Carbon Canyon Creek
- Height: 99 feet (30 m)
- Length: 2,610 feet (800 m)
- Dam volume: 1,500,000 cubic yards (1,100,000 m^{3})

Reservoir
- Creates: Carbon Canyon Reservoir
- Total capacity: 7,033 acre-feet (8,675,000 m^{3})
- Catchment area: 19.3 square miles (50 km^{2})
- Surface area: 221 acres (89 ha)

Carbon Canyon Dam (or Carbon Creek Dam) is a dam at the northern edge of Orange County, California. The dam is approximately 4 miles (6.4 km) east of the city of Brea and approximately 12 miles (19 km) north of the city of Santa Ana. The drainage area above the dam is 19.3 square miles (50 km^{2}) and is encompassed entirely within the Puente and Chino Hills. The Carbon Canyon Creek flows in a generally southwesterly direction onto the coastal Orange County Plain, joins Coyote Creek, and then flows into the San Gabriel River.

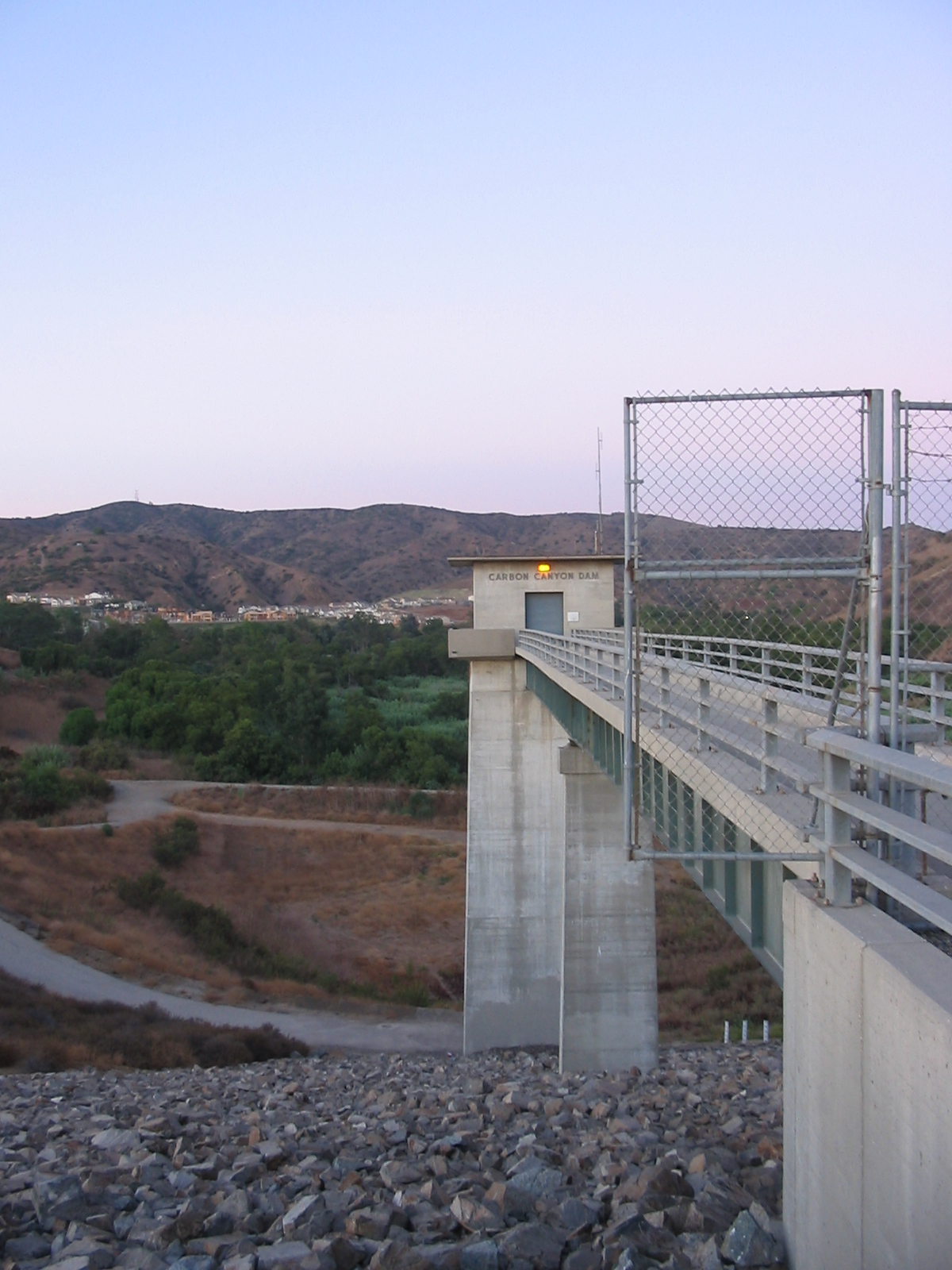
Photo of Carbon Canyon Dam in Yorba Linda, California looking towards flood control basin.

== Related control facilities ==
OCEMA maintains a series of flood retarding basins along the Carbon Creek Channel downstream of Carbon Canyon Dam. These basins are used to retard flood flows in the urbanized area downstream of Carbon Canyon Dam. The Carbon Canyon Diversion Channel serves to relay water from the Miller Basin Complex to the Santa Ana River. Miller Stilling Basin, the most upstream of the facilities, is the location point from which flow from Carbon Canyon Channel is diverted into Carbon Canyon Diversion Channel or Carbon Creek Channel. During periods of low flow, water is directed into the Diversion Channel, which flows into the lower Santa Ana River Channel and its attendant groundwater recharge facilities. Higher flows which fill Miller Basin are directed into Carbon Creek Channel and flow west into the next series of retarding basins on their way to the San Gabriel River Channel.

== Authorization ==
The Carbon Canyon Dam and Channel was authorized pursuant to two acts of Congress. The first of these, the Flood Control Act of 1936 (Public Law 738, 74th Congress, H.R. 8455, approved 22 June 1936), provided in part for the construction of reservoirs and related flood-control works for the protection of metropolitan Orange County, California. The second (Public Law 761, 75th Congress, approved 28 June 1938), amended the 1936 Act by providing for the acquisition by the United States of land, easements, and right-of-way for dam and reservoir projects, channel improvements, and channel rectification for flood control. The overall project was adopted in the Flood Control Act of 1936 on the basis of the 29 July 1935 report of the Orange County Flood Control District (OCFCD) in connection with an application for a grant under the Federal Emergency Relief Appropriation Act of 1935.

=== Planning and design ===
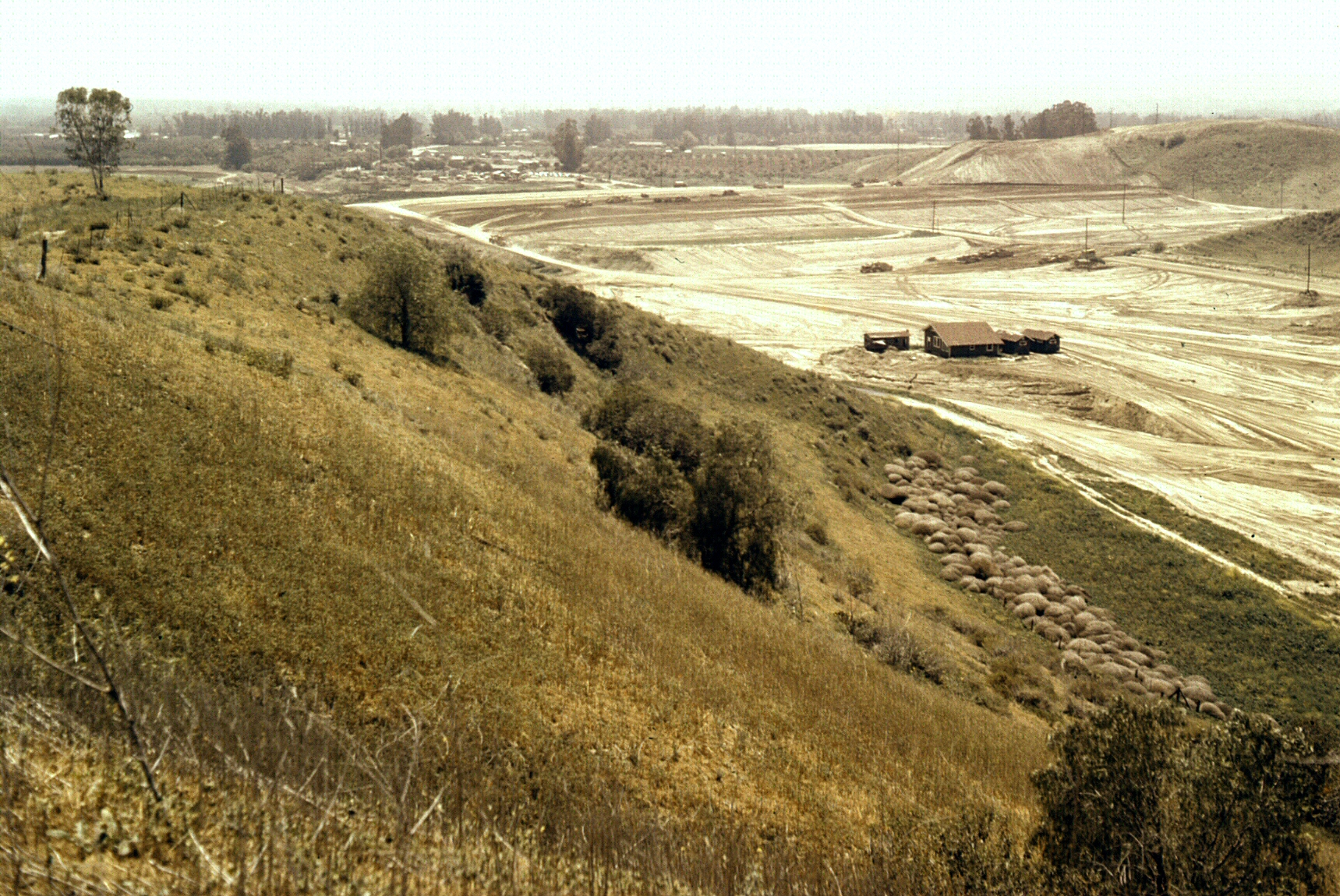
Photo shows construction of Carbon Canyon dam, circa 1950s.

Information generally pertaining to the dam was first presented in the OCFCD report mentioned above. In numerous subsequent conferences with the Los Angeles District (LAD) of the U.S. Army Corps of Engineers, the Orange County Board of Supervisors and OCFCD discussed the plan of improvement. A comprehensive report on a plan for flood control in Orange County, California, was prepared by OCFCD in March 1955. This plan included Carbon Canyon Dam and Carbon Canyon Creek channel improvements. Design of the dam, and a length of improved channel immediately downstream of the dam, was performed by LAD, and presented in "General Design for Carbon Canyon Dam and Channel, Design Memorandum No. 2, Santa Ana River Basin (and Orange County)", dated August 1957, submitted 21 February 1958, and approved with comments 17 April 1958. This memorandum included design of the dam, outlet works, spillway, and a concrete-lined channel 4,080 feet (1,240 m) in length (see para. 3-04a), as well as construction of drainage structures, relocation of two highways, modification of bridges, the removal of school buildings and residences, and the relocation of utilities.

=== Construction ===
Construction of the Carbon Canyon Dam started in April 1959 under contract DA 04-353-CIVENG-59-144, with work completed and accepted by the U.S. Army Corps of Engineers on 9 May 1961. Construction of the Corps project channel started in April 1960 and was completed in May 1961. The project was constructed by Oberg Construction Company of Northridge, California.

=== Related projects ===
Plate 1-1 shows projects related to Carbon Canyon Dam.

Carbon Canyon Channel. Carbon Canyon Channel (also called Carbon Canyon Creek) Canyon Dam partway to Miller Basin Complex, an OCEMA facility at the terminus of Carbon Canyon Channel. The remainder of Carbon Canyon Channel from the end of the LAD channel to Carbon Creek Channel has been partially improved, and is maintained by OCEMA. The Miller Basin Complex serves the functions of flood retarding basin, desilting basin, and stilling basin. At Miller Basin, Carbon Canyon Channel becomes Carbon Creek Channel. Miller Basin also serves to divide flow between Carbon Creek Channel (which flows to Coyote Creek and then the San Gabriel River) and Carbon Canyon Diversion Channel (which flows to the Santa Ana River).

At Miller Basin, the channel system divides into two channels: Carbon Canyon Diversion Channel, which flows south to the Santa Ana River; and Carbon Creek Channel, which flows west into Coyote Creek and on to the San Gabriel River. The average gradient of Carbon Canyon Creek is about 117 feet per mile above the dam site. The average gradient of Carbon Canyon and Carbon Creek Channels is about 55 feet per mile from the dam to the juncture with Coyote Creek. Telegraph Canyon Creek, the major tributary in the watershed above Carbon Canyon Dam, joins Carbon Canyon Creek within Carbon Canyon Reservoir.

== Downstream structures ==
Numerous flood retarding basins exist along the Carbon Canyon Creek, below the Carbon Canyon Dam. These basins are Miller, Placentia, Raymond, and Gilbert, in downstream order. These basins are occasionally used to infiltrate water; however, their main purpose is to reduce floodflows in the area downstream from the Carbon Canyon Dam. The Miller Basin Complex is approximately 3.5 miles (5.6 km) downstream of the dam at the confluence of the Carbon Canyon Channel and Atwood Channel. It consists of a small stilling basin, retarding basin, desilting basin, and flow diversion structure. Flows entering the Miller Basin Complex first run through the stilling basin, then into the desilting basin where a set of overflow weirs split flows between the Carbon Canyon Diversion Channel (diverting flows to the Santa Ana River) and the Miller Retarding Basin. The capacity of the stilling basin is 44 ac-ft, while the capacity of the retarding basin is 340 ac-ft. The weir separating the stilling basin from the desilting basin is small and nearly covered by sediment and vegetation.

The desilting basin has two weirs which serve different purposes. The lowlevel weir at the south end of the basin acts to restrict and divert flows to the Santa Ana River via the Carbon Canyon Diversion Channel. This weir has a capacity of about 3200 ft3/s. There is also a weir at the west end of the desilting basin at a higher elevation above which flows enter Miller Retarding Basin. The capacity of this weir is about 6000 ft3/s. There is also an emergency spillway at the west and which empties into a ditch. This ditch eventually leads back into Carbon Creek, which flows toward Coyote Creek. Thus inflow to Miller Basin may be, when necessary or desired, split between the Carbon Canyon Diversion Channel and Carbon Creek Channel, and passed into the lower Santa Ana or San Gabriel Rivers, respectively.

== Flood control ==
The plan for controlling floods on the Carbon Canyon Creek below Carbon Canyon Dam is presented in this section. The objective of the water control plan is to maximize flood control benefits. Project releases will be regulated to protect downstream communities and to avoid spillway flow. Although releases from Carbon Canyon Dam could affect downstream discharges in Coyote Creek and the Santa Ana River, the dam is not usually regulated as part of these systems. Release rates from the dam are not to exceed the downstream capacity of Carbon Canyon Channel between the outlet works and Golden Avenue.

== See also ==
- Floodgate
- List of reservoirs and dams in California
- List of lakes in California
- List of largest dams
- Rivers of California
- List of rivers of California
