= Sand Canyon Wash =

Location
- Country: United States
- State: California
- City: Irvine

Physical characteristics
- Source: Sand Canyon Reservoir
  - location: San Joaquin Hills
  - coordinates: 33°38′51″N 117°47′37″W
  - elevation: 163 ft (50 m)
- Mouth: San Diego Creek
  - location: William R. Mason Regional Park
  - coordinates: 33°39′29″N 117°50′33″W
  - elevation: 20 ft (6.1 m)
- Length: 6.9 mi (11.1 km), East-west
- Basin size: 4 mi^{2} (10 km^{2})
- Discharge
  - location: Culver Drive, near the mouth
  - average: 1.05 cu ft/s (0.030 m^{3}/s)
  - minimum: 0.103 cu ft/s (0.0029 m^{3}/s)
  - maximum: 1,310 cu ft/s (37 m^{3}/s)

Sand Canyon Wash is an approximately 6.9-mile (11.1 km) (to its longest source) tributary of San Diego Creek in Orange County, California.

== Course ==
Its headwaters rise in the northern San Joaquin Hills as two streams, Shady Canyon Creek and Bommer Canyon Creek, then flows northwest into Sand Canyon Reservoir, formed by a dam across Strawberry Valley east of the community of Turtle Rock near Irvine. The dry creek bed continues northwest from the reservoir, turning west where it enters the city of Irvine, flowing along the northeastern boundary of William R. Mason Regional Park.

The creek then turns west to empty into San Diego Creek in its San Joaquin Marsh section, about 2 miles (3.2 km) above where the larger creek enters Upper Newport Bay.

== See also ==
- San Diego Creek bicycle path
- San Joaquin Hills
