= Peters Canyon Regional Park =

Valley in California, United States of America

Coordinates: 33.7841°N 117.7623°W

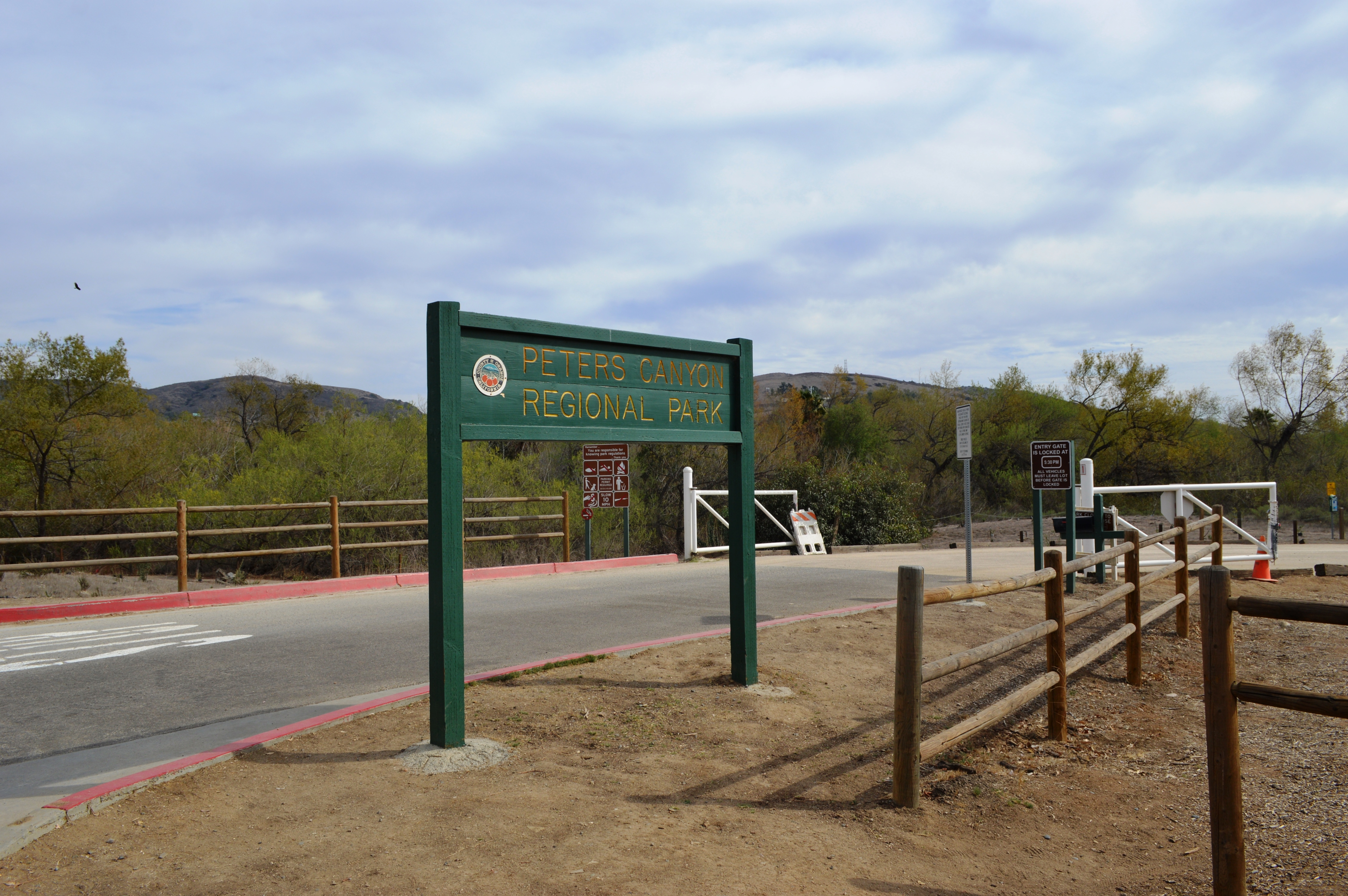
Peters Canyon Regional Park

Peters Canyon Regional Park is a regional park within the Orange County Regional Parks System in California. The park contains 354 acres of southern California wildlife, including coastal sage shrub, riparian, freshwater marsh, and grasslands, and is located within the boundaries of both Orange, California and Tustin, California. Peters Canyon was given to this city in 1992 by the Irvine Company who had used it previously for cattle grazing. The canyon is lined with a residential area on one side and open hills on the other. This canyon is commonly used by hikers, mountain bikers, and equestrians because of the trails that circumvent the 50 acre man-made lake, which was constructed by the Irvine Company in 1931, on the interior of the plot. The regional park is open from 7:00 AM to sunset every day of the week, save for the chance of rain or hazardous conditions, in which case the park will be closed for three days following the particular occurrence.

The park has garnered local popularity in part for its convenient location (the canyon is in a suburban neighborhood), as well as its cleanliness and varied trail options. The management asks that visitors see protecting the park's wildlife, as well as any construction or park improvement efforts, as a shared responsibility.

== History ==
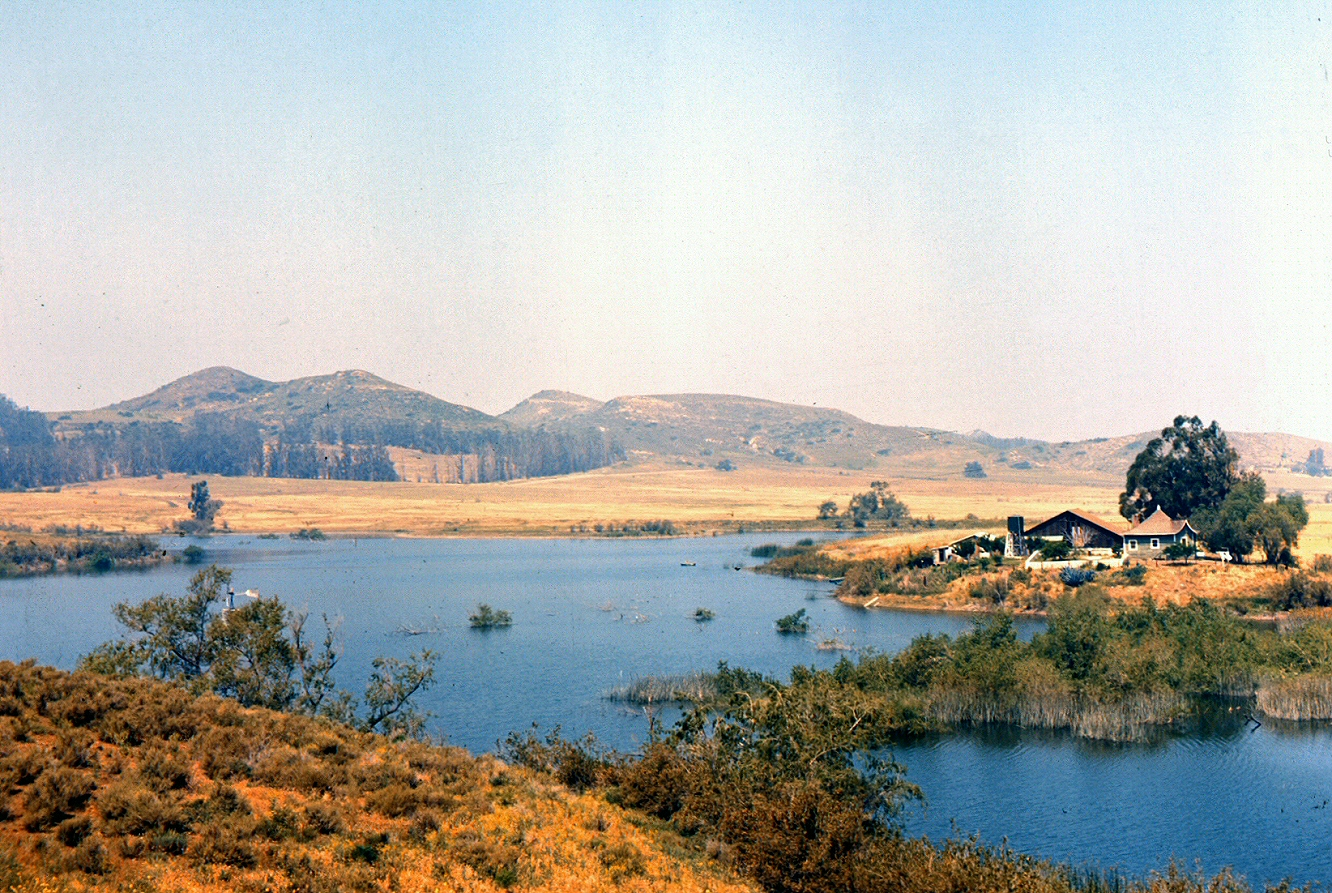
Upper Peters Canyon Reservoir at the headwaters of Peters Canyon Wash in 1966.

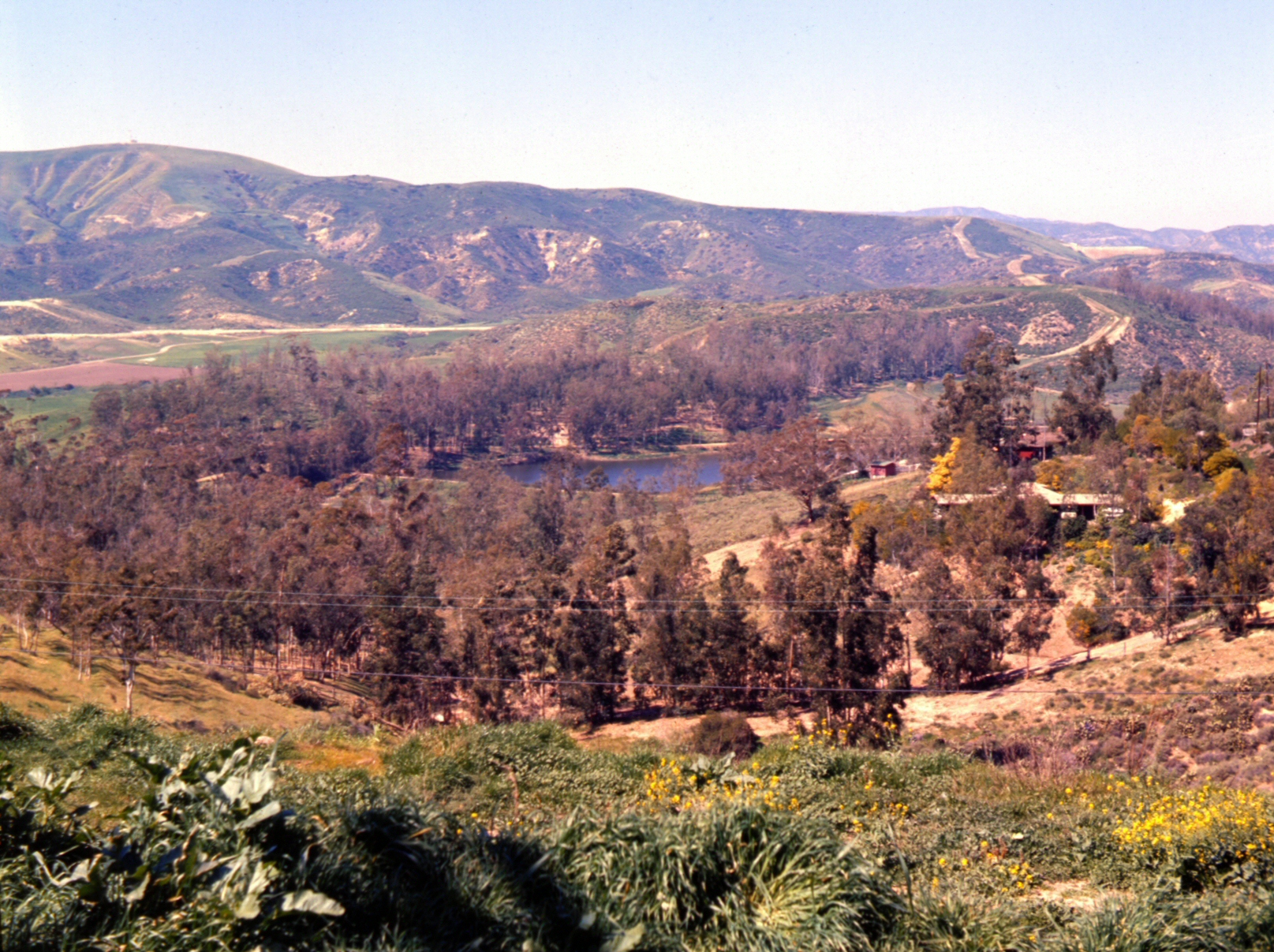
Little Peters Canyon Lake, photo taken in March 1966. This reservoir is currently dry.

Peters Canyon Regional Park was originally part of the Spanish Land Grant known as Rancho Lomas de Santiago which was a 47,000-acre (19,000 ha) piece of land given by governor Pico Pico to Teodosio Yorba in 1846. The section that was to become Peter's Canyon was known as "Canon de Las Ranas" which translates to "Canyon of the Frogs". The name came from the fact that it drained into the "Cienega de Las Ranas", which is Spanish for "Marsh of the Frogs" which is now known as Upper Newport Bay. In 1897 James Irvine purchased the land from Yorba and leased the land to several farmers one of which was James Peters. Peters built a ranch house and planted a eucalyptus grove near Little Peter Lake which was located in the lower part of the Canyon of the Frogs.

In 1899 golf was introduced by some sportsmen from Orange and Santa Ana. The Santiago Golf Club was built in Peters Canyon on land leased from the Irvine Company. The greens were made from oil soaked sand and the fairways consisted of native soil. A red club house was built on the ridge that now extends into Upper Peters Canyon reservoir. The Upper Peters Canyon reservoir was built in 1931, and the lower reservoir (Little Peters Canyon Lake, which is now a flood control basin) in 1940 to conserve water. With this availability of water, agriculture which included orange groves thrived in the canyon. The reservoirs nowadays are known as Peters Canyon Wash. The wash is part of the San Diego Creek which is a 26-mile waterway that flows into Upper Newport Bay.

=== Camp Myford ===
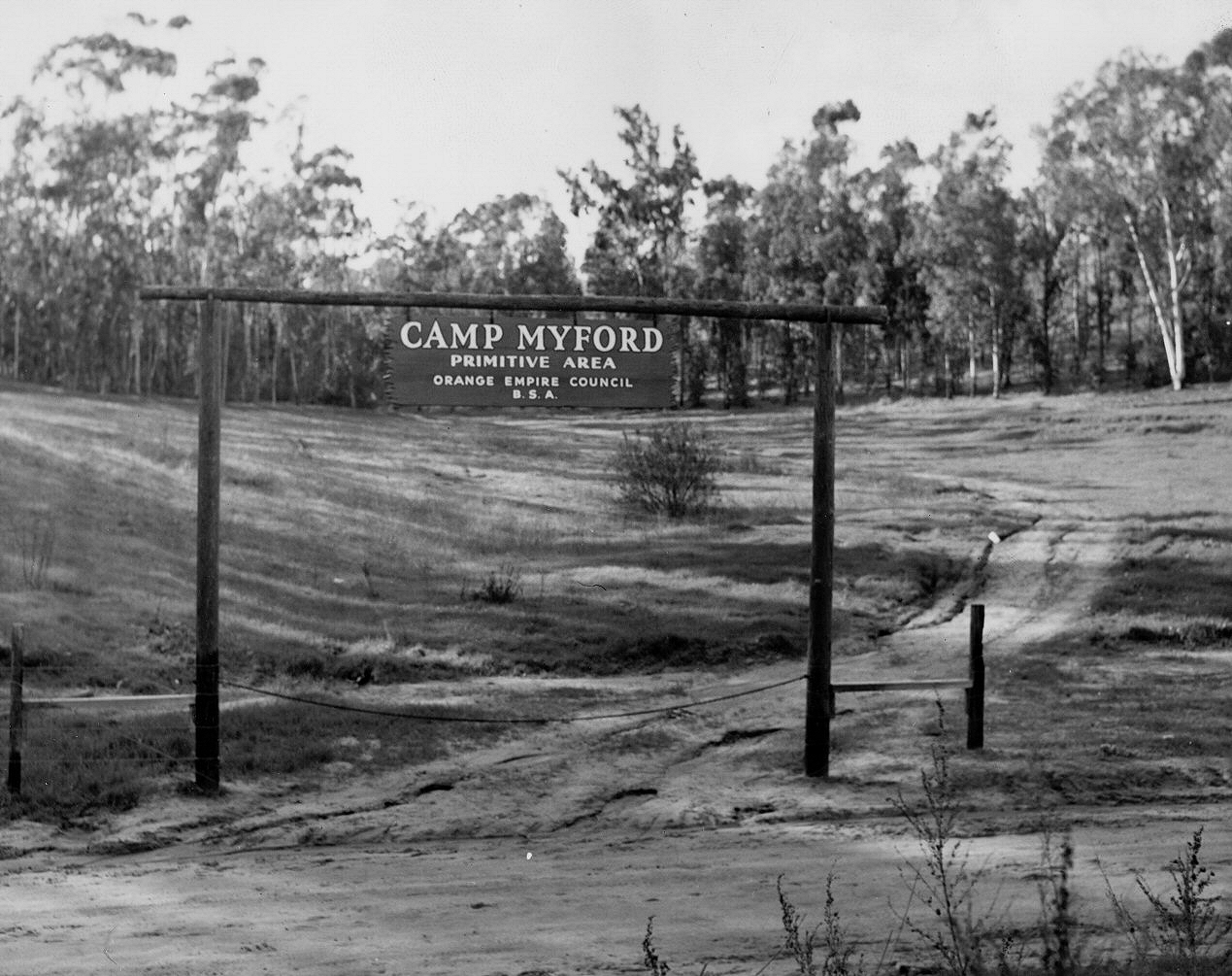
Camp Myford, Tustin, 1952

During World War II the U.S. Army established a training area called Camp Commander in the eucalyptus grove near Little Peters Lake. The men that were stationed here would fight mock battles against soldiers from Camp Rathke, an Army Post about two miles away in Irvine Regional park. From 1952 to 1988 the Boy Scouts took stewardship of Camp Myford for weekend scouting events. While, a gated community called Tustin Ranch Estates occupies a portion of the site of the former Camp Myford, the Irvine Co. donated 354-acre (143 ha) to the County of Orange on March 3, 1992, to be a regional park. This is now preserved as an open space for the public.

== Recreation ==
Peters Canyon is commonly used by hikers, mountain bikers, and equestrians because of its lengthy trails, which include Newport Boulevard Trail, Meadowlark Trail, Skylark Trail, Lake View Loop Trail, Lower Peters Canyon Trail, Peters Canyon Creek Trail, Gnatcatcher Trail, Sage Trail, Opossum Trail, and East View Ridge Trail. The longest trail is approximately 5.5 miles long, roundtrip. The Mountains to Sea Trail, a 22-mile-long trail that stretches from Weir Canyon to Upper Newport Bay, passes through Peters Canyon as well, connecting it to other wild parks in the local area. The trails are well maintained by rangers and local citizens who volunteer their time to the park. Another common activity to take part in when tourists visit the canyon is birdwatching, as there are more than one hundred different bird species, including various waterfowl and riparian species. The park is open to equestrians and is also dog friendly.

== Wildlife ==
The canyon is home to varied wildlife, including, but not limited to, mule deer, raccoons, opossums, bobcats, coyotes, and rattlesnakes. Numerous mountain lion sightings have been reported, though attacks are rare. In addition to larger animals, the canyon is home to many smaller amphibians, reptiles and insects, some of them poisonous. Over 100 species of various migratory waterfowl and wading birds are drawn to the canyon's reservoir throughout the year. Cactus wrens, gnatcatchers, tri-colored blackbirds and rufous-crowned sparrows are some of the species that can be seen amongst the varying habitats contained in the park year-round. A variety of trees and plants can be found in the canyon, both indigenous and non-native. Rare black cottonwood trees, willows and oaks, sycamore, and varying cacti, brush and grasses can be seen from the trails. Additionally, a small eucalyptus forest (originally planted by farmer James Peters) can be found in the southern region of the canyon.

Habitats found in the canyon include freshwater marsh, coastal sage, scrub, grasslands, and the riparian sections connecting them. A small creek runs through the canyon seasonally.

The park maintains the idea that its visitors share the duty of protecting its wildlife. Therefore, any fires, or swimming in the creeks or reservoir is prohibited, as is fishing in the reservoir. The park also asks that minors stay under adult supervision and dogs stay on leashes.

== Photos ==
Peters Canyon
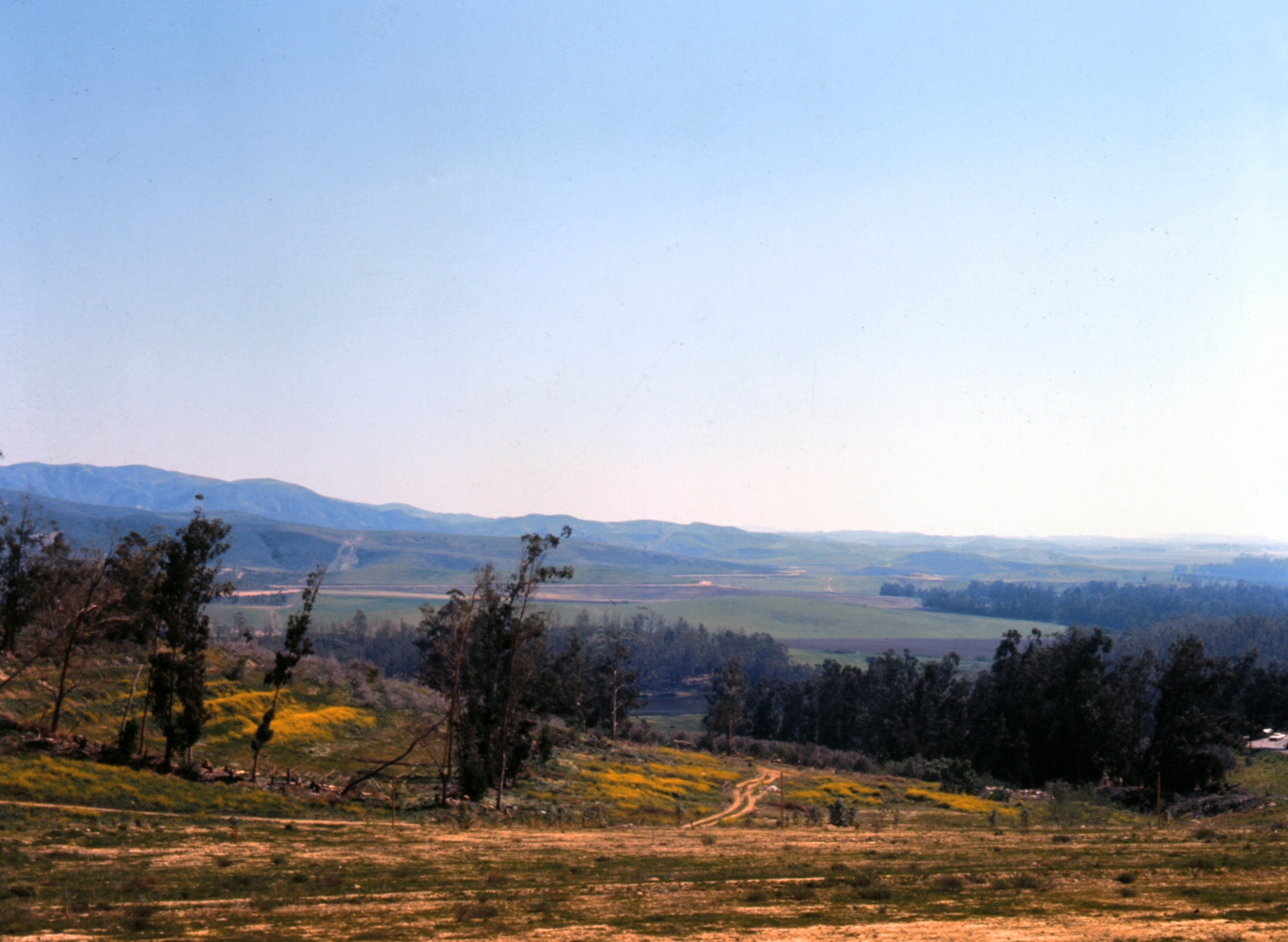
A scenic view of Peters Canyon, photo taken in March 1966.

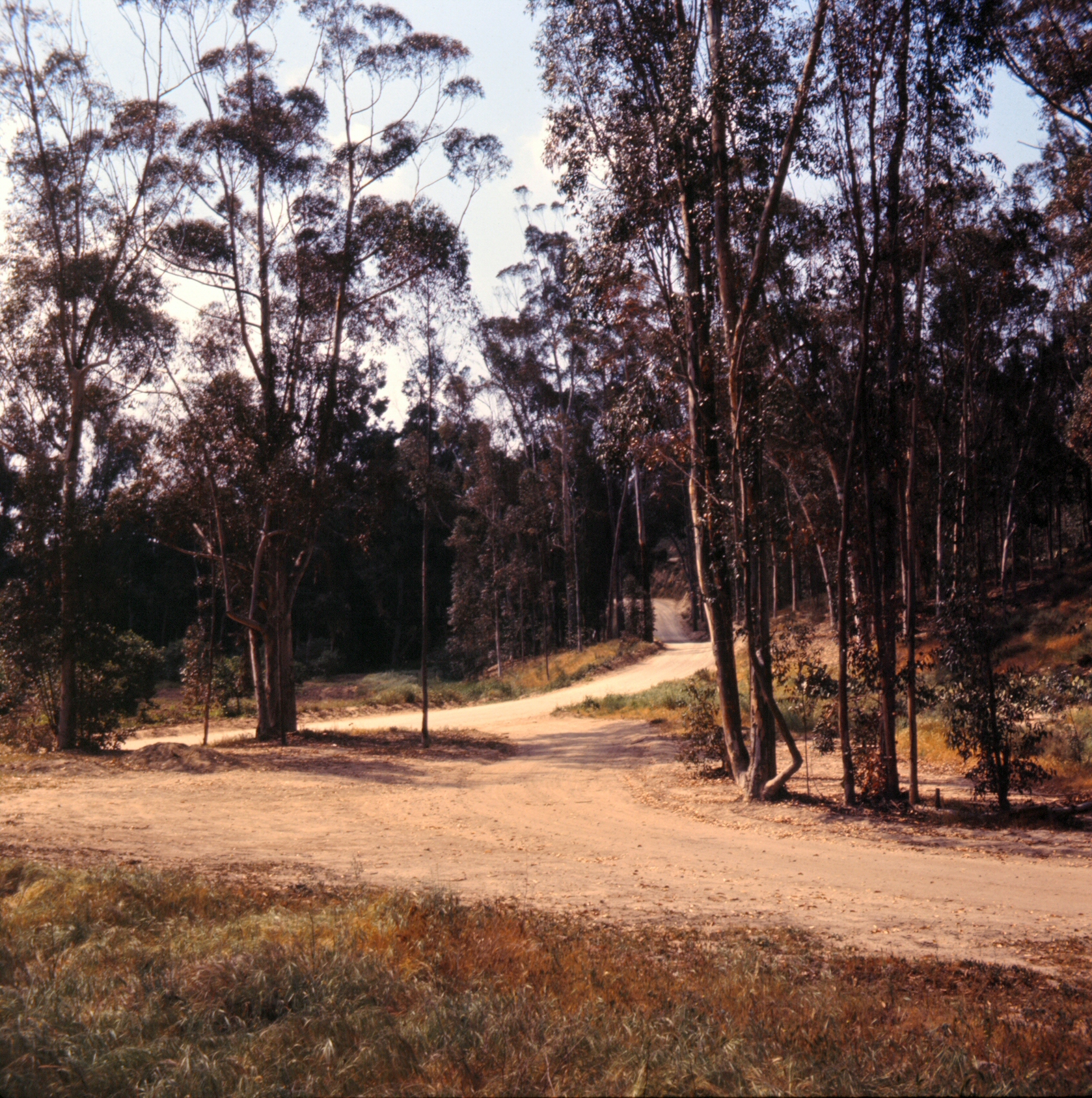
Peters Canyon Road, surrounded by eucalyptus trees, in April 1966.

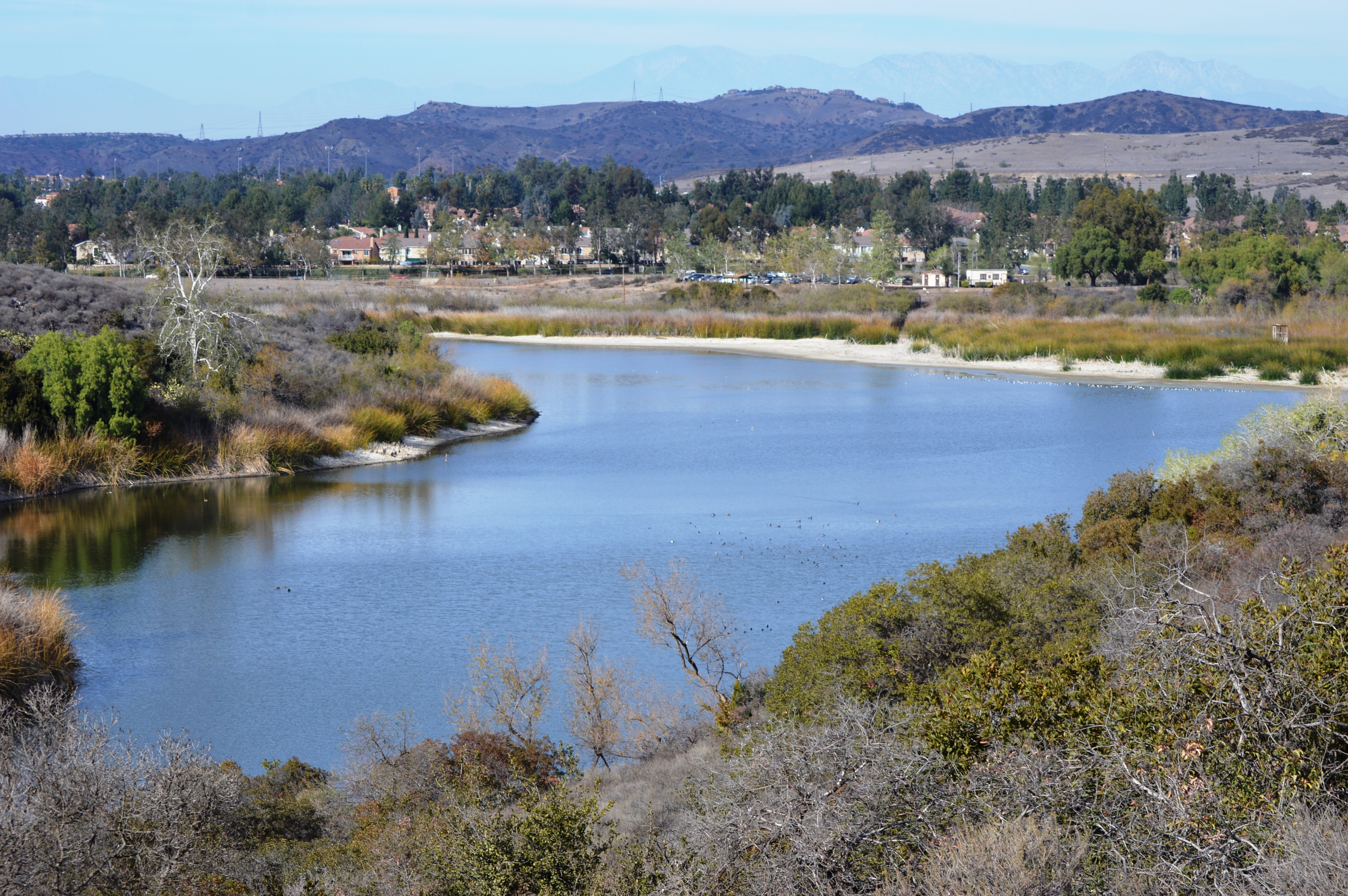
Peters Canyon Reservoir today.
