= San Diego Creek bicycle path =

Cycle route in Irvine, California, United States

The San Diego Creek bicycle path is a cycling route in the city of Irvine, California. The path connects major points such as Newport Beach, University of California, Irvine, Boomers Irvine, Colonel Bill Barber Park, Irvine Civic Center, Irvine Crossroads shopping center, Woodbridge High School, Woodbridge Community Park, Atria Senior Residential Area, Windrow Community Park and Irvine Medical Complex, before reaching Irvine Spectrum Center. It also runs through the majority of Irvine's neighborhoods such as Westpark, Woodbridge, and Oak Creek. The path begins where the San Diego Creek empties into Upper Newport Bay.

== Main trail ==
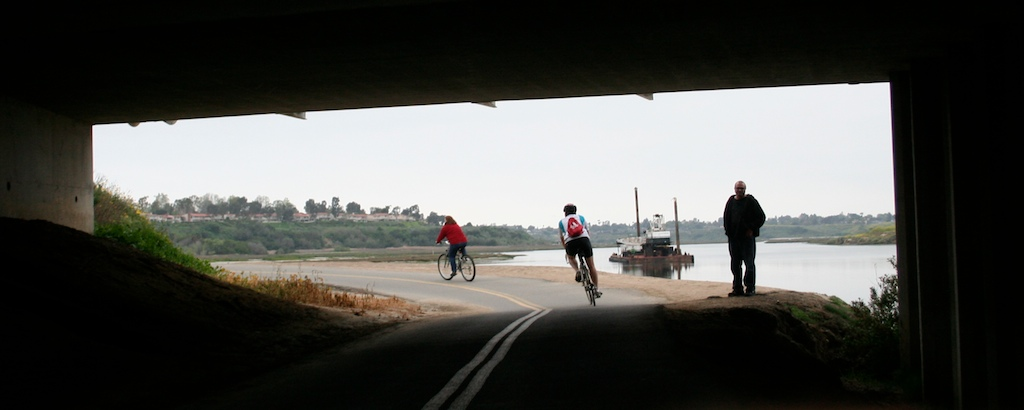
San Diego Creek Trail as it passes under Jamboree Road at the Newport Back Bay

One entry point is Bayview Way, just off Jamboree Road between Route 73 and the bridge over San Diego Creek. Riders can enter the path here and proceed North back to Jamboree Road and then East across the bridge, then take the ramp under the bridge.

Heading North, the path passes through a wetlands area until it parallels University Drive with University of California, Irvine on the opposite side. Access is continuous along this stretch, although public parking is not.

University Drive veers East and the path and creek continue due North, with the wetlands giving way to a concrete-bottom storm drain. The path passes under Main Street and Alton Parkway, each of which includes an access ramp. The path then reaches a fork in the creek near Colonel Barber park, where public restrooms and water are available. The path crosses to the opposite side on a bridge and continues on the Eastern branch of the creek, leading under more underpasses with street access at Harvard Avenue and Culver Drive.

The path passes through the residential center of Irvine, municipal parks, and a lawn-like slope around the creek. There are several at-grade crossings of avenues. At one point, there is another bridge that crosses the creek and is part of another bike trail that runs perpendicular to the creek trail, running through the central park of Irvine and frequented by a large number of pedestrians.

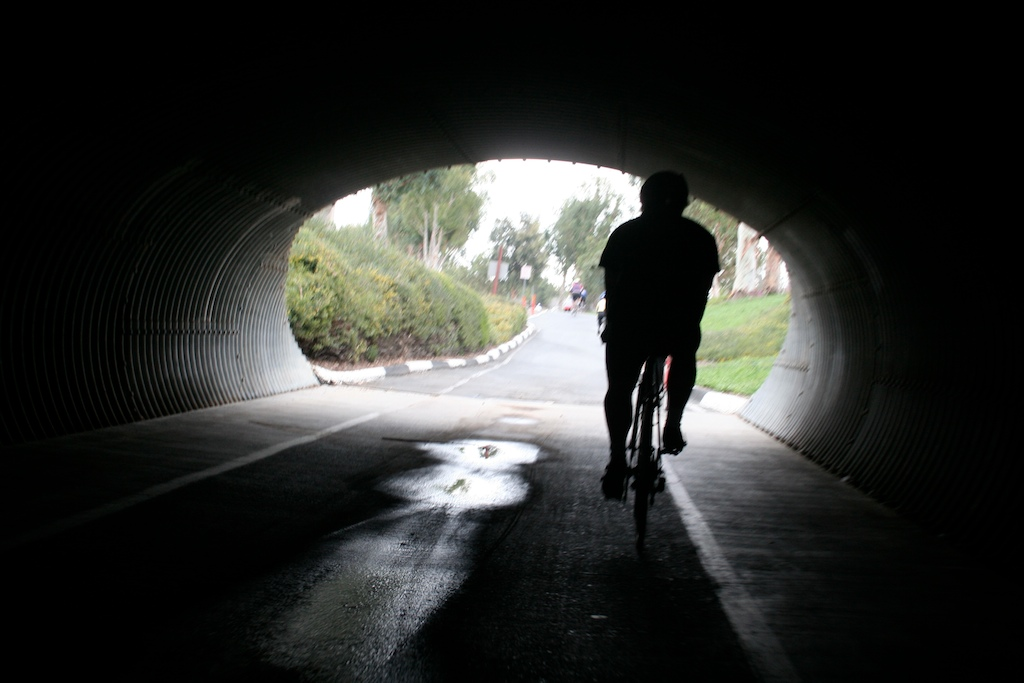
San Diego Creek Trail Tunnel under E. Yale Loop near Woodrow Community Park in Irvine, CA

The creek path continues to the East and culminates in a landscaped section that includes two short bike tunnels as it passes through Windrow Park. The last tunnel emerges on the East side of Jeffrey Road without clear signage. Making a sharp left curve, the trail runs concurrently south with Jeffrey Road to the car bridge over the creek, where there is an entrance to the continuation of the path separating from Jeffrey Road. The path runs past the Oak Creek community until it reaches the Irvine Medical Complex and the industrial park outskirts of Irvine, crossing under Sand Canyon Avenue and Laguna Canyon Road. The path continues for a short stretch on the South side of the creek and dead-ends. It is possible to cross over to the North side of the creek and continue to the Highway 133 underpass, and emerge into the Irvine Spectrum Center.

== Alternate return path ==
There is an alternate return path that includes Class 2 bike lanes, a Class 1 path through the hills above Irvine, and a Class 1 path built as part of the planned subdivisions of older Irvine. Access is South on Old Laguna, which leads through quiet industrial park areas to a bridge over Interstate 405, and on to an area of newly developed townhomes all on Class 2 bike lanes. Turning right at Quail Hill Parkway leads to a traffic circle; to the left at the circle, uphill, is the start of the new Class 1 path.

The Class 1 path begins on an uphill stretch, followed by a downhill ride through a canyon area, part of a land development named Shady Canyon. Ultimately, the path leads to an entrance guard house, and continues to the left on a section of Class I path. Taking the sidewalk to the right of the guard house leads back to surface roads. Taking the first right on Sunnyhill leads to a crossing into a small park, where there is a sidewalk / bike path that heads back uphill. This ends on a downhill street which leads to an intersection. Turning left at the intersection and using the sidewalk, which doubles as a bike path, leads downhill to the entrance to another Class 1 bike path, which snakes downhill on a narrow greenway passing under streets in special tunnels.

At the base of the hill the path emerges into a wetlands area along University Drive:

- A right turn leads back north to Interstate 405, which has a recently completed section of Class 1 trail that crosses I-405 to Jeffrey Road, which intersects San Diego Creek some distance to the north of I-405.
- A left turn leads south through the wetlands crossing Culver Drive at grade, into another municipal park. The dedicated Class 1 path continues ending at a diagonal crossing of Harvard Avenue. In a very short distance, behind the Evangelical Church, is one of the ramp entrances to the creek path. Turning left here leads back south to Newport Bay and the end of the San Diego Creek Path.

== Peters Canyon branch ==
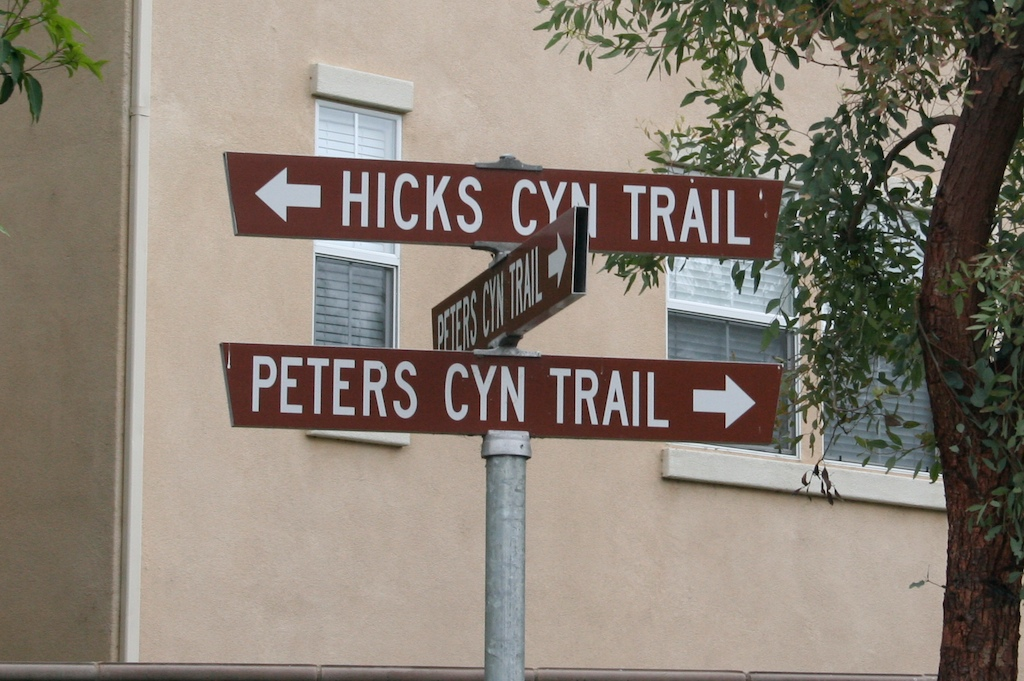
Hicks Canyon Trail and Peters Canyon Trail Connection North of where they connect to the San Diego Creek Trail

The Peters Canyon bike trail is a medium length Class 1 facility that branches from the San Diego Creek trail in Irvine. It is possible to make a Class I trip from San Diego Creek to the terminus of the trail in Peters Canyon.

The first section is a detour that begins at the corner of Barranca Parkway and Harvard Avenue. Cyclists coming up the San Diego trail from the south will note the branch between the channel of the San Diego Creek and Peters Canyon Wash. This is soon followed by the trail crossing the San Diego on a small bridge.

After several at grade street crossings the trail arrives at railroad tracks just North of Edinger Avenue. There is a Class I trail to the right before the tracks which proceeds northeast toward Sand Canyon Avenue. To continue on Peters Canyon, cross the tracks and pick up the Class I bike trail to the left, crossing Harvard Avenue.

This trail parallels the railroad for a short distance before turning sharply right parallel to Peters Canyon Wash. The trail descends into the wash under Interstate 5 with the water in the wash, restricted to a narrow concrete ditch that is part of the concrete block comprising the trail.

Rising back out of the wash, the trail reaches Bryan Avenue. Taking the underpass, the cyclist should make a hairpin right onto the Bryan Avenue exit ramp. A Class I trail does continue on the East side of the wash and includes several branches to the East into Irvine. However, the Peters Canyon trail crosses the wash and CA Route 261 to the West on the overpass which has a dedicated Class I facility. Turning right, the Peters Canyon trail continues on the West side of the wash. Traveling North, the Peters Canyon trail runs parallel to an equestrian trail.

The trail follows the wash and the 261 for a short distance until passing under Irvine Avenue in a tunnel. It then turns West winding its way through a condominium community ultimately emerging alongside Jamboree Rd. Uphill, there are several at grade street crossings until the trail enters a park and then turns under Jamboree Rd to emerge on the other side. Some more at grade crossings are encountered until the trail turns West and North winding its way toward Peters Canyon Park finally entering the park terminating near the Lower Peters Canyon Reservoir.

Combined with the San Diego Creek trail, starting at Newport Bay the total distance to Peters Canyon Park is approximately 15 miles and has a vertical rise of about 350 feet. The trail is fully Class I except for at grade street crossings and in excellent condition. There are signs and stencils on the San Diego Creek trail and the Peters Canyon trail marking them both collectively as 'Mountains to Sea Trail'.

== See also ==
- Jeffrey Open Space Trail
- List of San Diego bike paths
- List of Orange County bike paths
- List of Los Angeles bike paths
