= Bonita Creek =

Stream in Orange County, California

Coordinates: 33°39′05″N 117°51′42″W

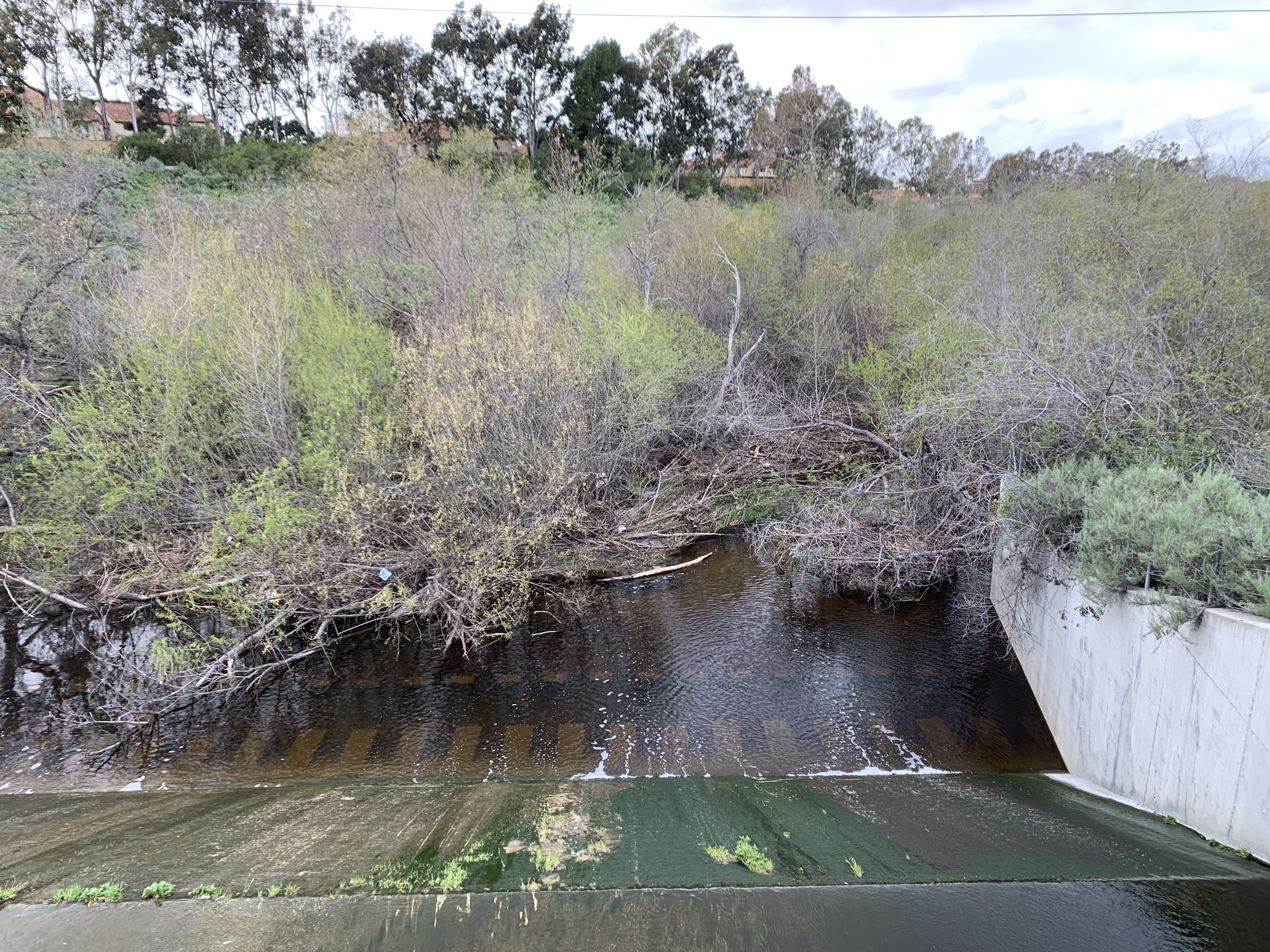
- Bonita Creek spillway

Bonita Creek is a stream in the city of Newport Beach, Orange County, California. It flows for about 3 miles (4.8 km) northwest from the San Joaquin Reservoir to its confluence with the San Diego Creek near Upper Newport Bay.

== Image gallery ==
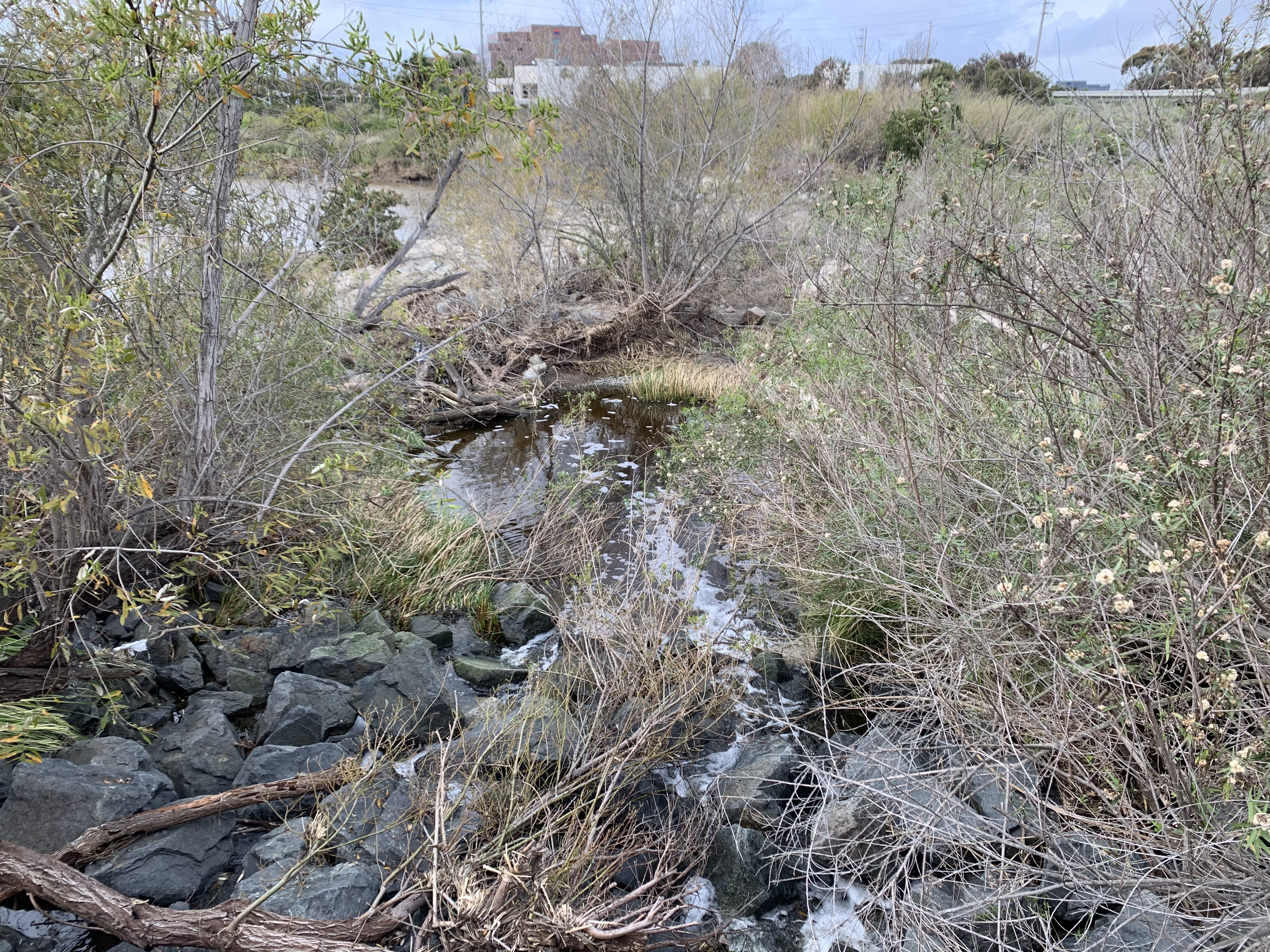
Bonita Creek flowing into San Diego Creek

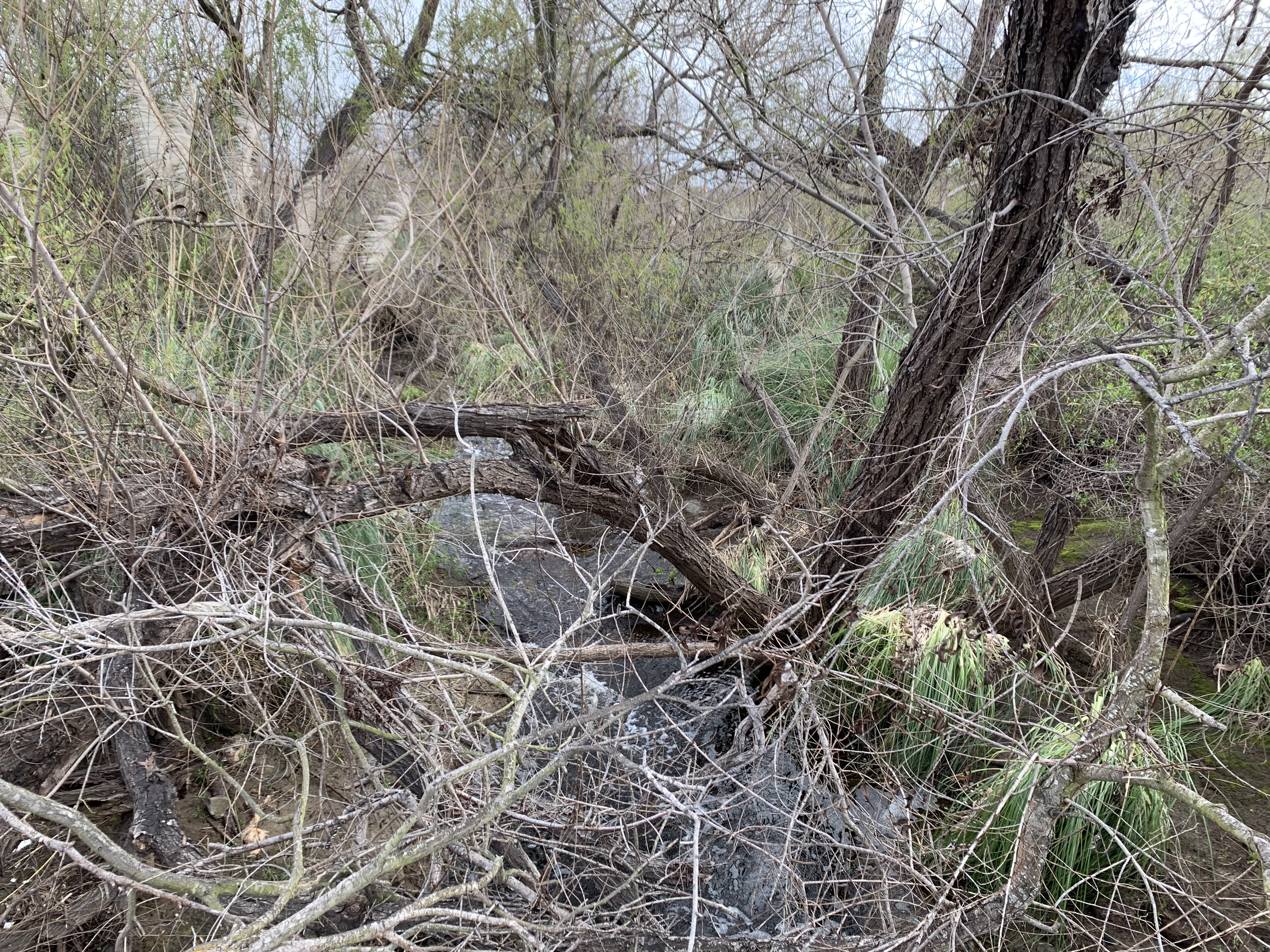
Bonita Creek near its junction with San Diego Creek

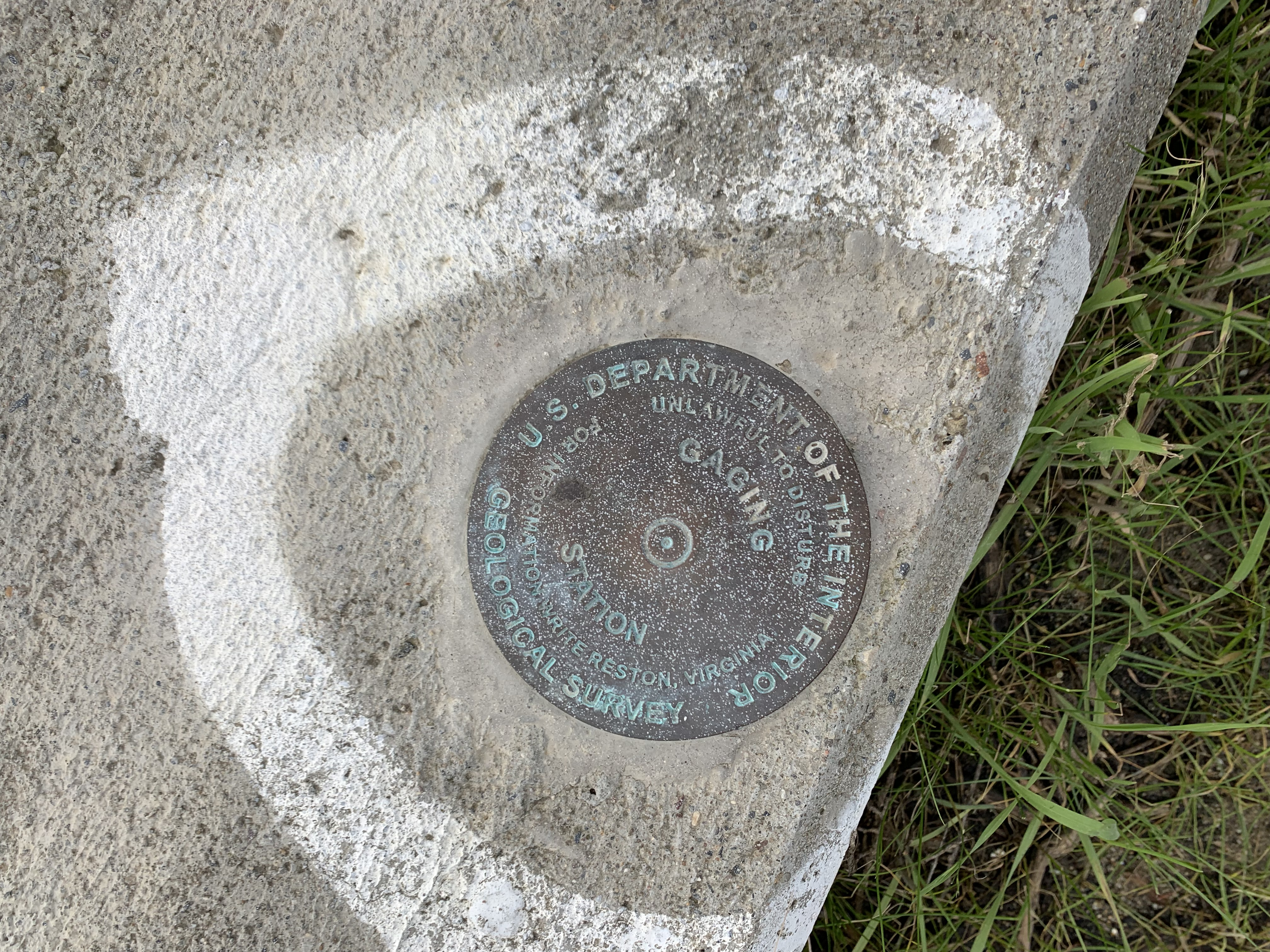
USGS stream gaging station

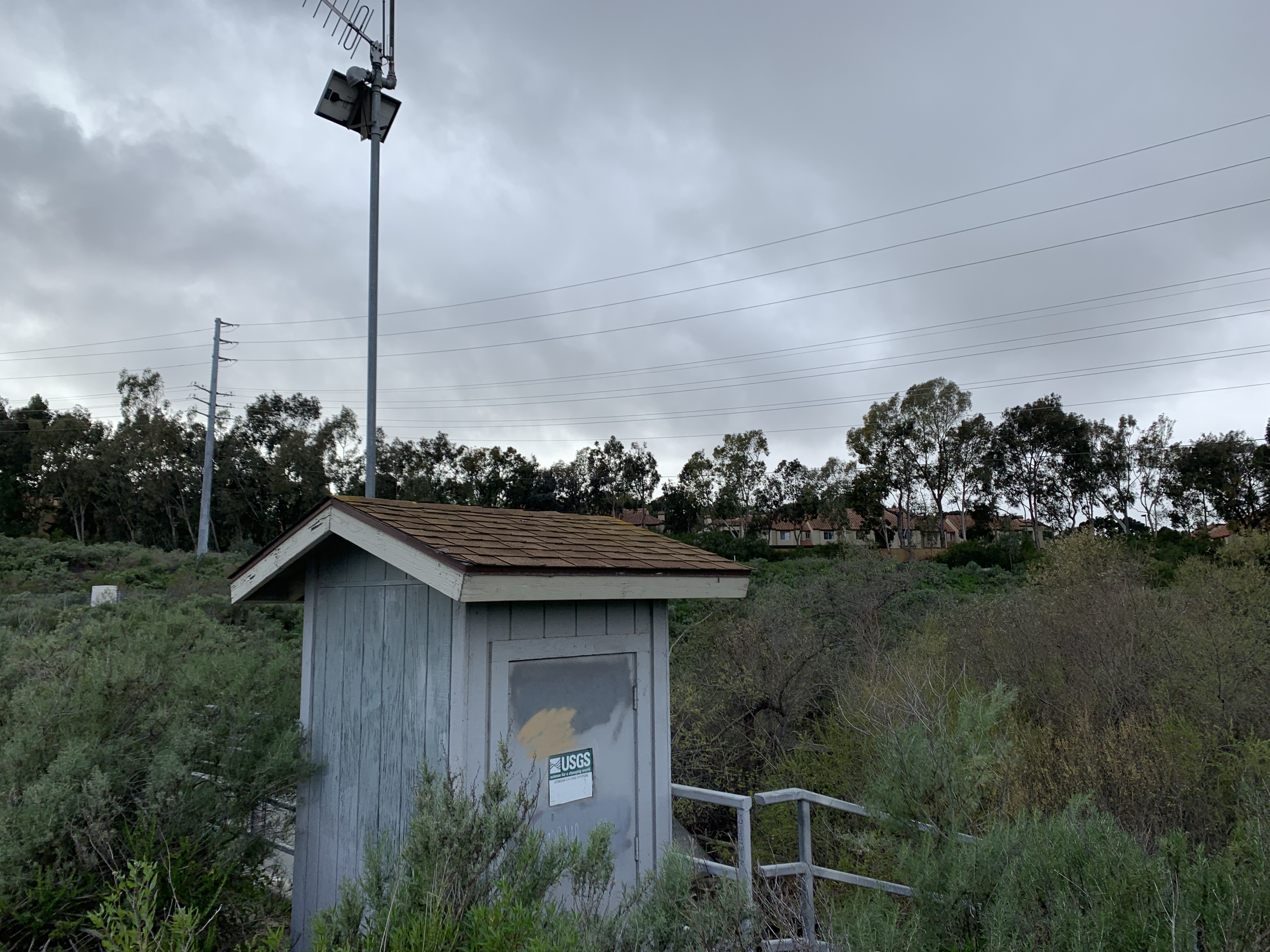
Stream gaging station

== See also ==
- List of rivers of Orange County, California
