= Serrano Creek =

River in California, United States

Coordinates: 33°39′01″N 117°42′24″W

Serrano Creek is a roughly 7.5-mile (12.1 km) tributary of San Diego Creek in the U.S. state of California. The creek starts in the Santa Ana Mountains in a canyon in Whiting Ranch Wilderness Park, near the boundary of the Cleveland National Forest. It then flows southwest into the city of Lake Forest, running in a channelized course roughly parallel to Aliso Creek. It abruptly turns northwest then southwest at 90-degree angles as it enters a large storm drain that takes it the rest of the way to the confluence with the La Cañada Channel, creating the main stem of San Diego Creek.
