= Irvine Park (Orange, California) =

- U.S. National Register of Historic Places
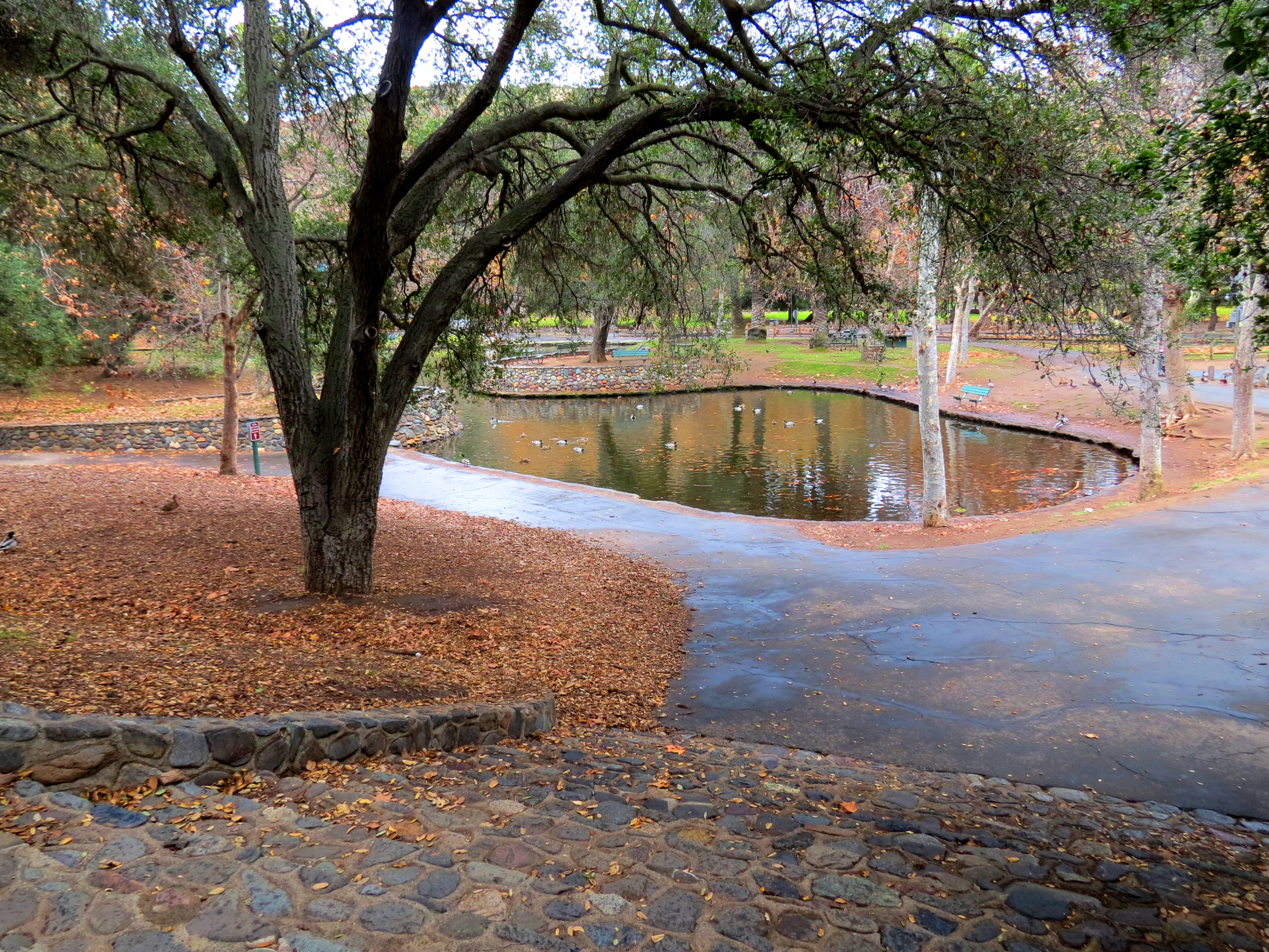

- Location within California Location within the United States
- Location: 1 Irvine Park Road, Orange, California
- Coordinates: 33.7953°N 117.7506°W
- Area: 160 acres (65 ha)
- Built: 1897
- Architect: Frederick Eley
- NRHP reference No.: 83001215
- Added to NRHP: April 7, 1983

Irvine Park is a 495-acre (200 ha) park in Orange, California. It became California's first regional park in 1897. When first opened, it was called Orange County Park, and was originally 160 acres which were gifted by James Irvine, the park's namesake.

It was listed on the National Register of Historic Places in 1983 and includes six contributing buildings, four contributing structures and four contributing objects.

== History ==
The land that is now Irvine Regional Park was originally part of Jose Antonio Yorba's 47,227 acre Mexican land grant, Rancho Lomas de Santiago. In 1860, the land was sold for $7,000 to a trader named William Wolfskill, and changed hands for the same price again in 1860, this time to sheepmen from Monterey County. At the time, demand for wool was high, and flocks of sheep populated the park and its plateaus. As nearby communities grew, the area became a well-known gathering place for valley dwellers, and became known locally as the Picnic Grounds, with organized festivities taking place on the Fourth of July and May Day.

In 1876, the grove and the surrounding rancho came into the possession of James Irvine who wanted to the area to become a park, and gifted the 160-acre (65 ha) plot of land to the County of Orange on October 5, 1897, for $1. He stipulated that the area should be well maintained and that the trees should be cared for. On October 11, 1897, the Orange County Board of Supervisors accepted the gift, and the park officially became known as Orange County Park. Improvements to the park followed over the next 20 years, including a caretaker's house, outdoor stoves, outhouses, a roofed concessions stand, and a boat pond. Throughout the 1910s, the park became the setting of official gatherings, such as dedications and veterans awards ceremonies.

In 1919, Jesse Irwin became the park custodian and oversaw various park improvements in the 1920s, those including, wooden picnic tables, restrooms, the introduction of commercial electricity, and a peewee golf course at the entrance to the park. In the 1920s, Ray Martin and his father leased the site, and added a miniature railroad.

In 1927, the park was officially renamed Irvine Park. A new building program followed which added a new pavilion, an exhibition hall, and a new store to the parks amenities. "The Exhibit Building," was originally erected to serve as a museum, complete with artifacts of Orange County's past, but instead served as a local "Parade of Products," showcasing agriculture and manufacturing products. The park was originally a hotspot for camping, but by the 1930s in an effort to crack down on squatters, all camping in the park was banned.

In November 1942, the Army acquired a total of 225 acres of land, 160 acres in lease from Orange County and 65 acres in lease from James Irvine to construct Camp Irvine and Camp Rathke respectively. As a result, Irvine Park was closed to the public, and during this time was utilized by the Santa Ana Army Air Base for training troops in field and command post exercises. Mock battles were held with Camp Commander, and Army training and rehabilitation center at nearby Peters Canyon. For the Camp Irvine portion, temporary barracks were built, and the Irvine Park soda fountain was used as a Postal Exchange building during this time. The 160 acre lease expired in 1943, and the 65 acre lease expired in 1946, by which point training exercises ceased and the land was returned to its respective owners, reopening Irvine Park.

== See also ==
- National Register of Historic Places listings in Orange County, California
