= Agua Chinon Creek =

River in the United States of America

Location
- Country: United States
- State: California

Physical characteristics
- Source: The Sinks
  - location: Limestone Canyon Nature Preserve, Santa Ana Mountains
  - coordinates: 33°42′47″N 117°39′30″W
  - elevation: 1,400 ft (430 m)
- Mouth: San Diego Creek
  - location: Irvine
  - coordinates: 33°39′15″N 117°45′31″W
  - elevation: 167 ft (51 m)
- Length: 7.96 mi (12.81 km)
- Basin size: 11.01 mi^{2} (28.5 km^{2})

Agua Chinon Creek or Agua Chinon Wash is an urban stream in the city of Irvine, Orange County, California. The creek flows southwest from its headwaters in the foothills of the Santa Ana Mountains for about 8 miles (13 km) to join San Diego Creek near the Verizon Amphitheatre. The creek drains a total watershed area of 7,049 acres (2,853 ha).

The headwaters of the creek consist of approximately 1,200 acres (490 ha) of undeveloped canyonlands in the Limestone Canyon Nature Preserve. The area includes the badlands known as The Sinks, which are nicknamed "the Grand Canyon of Orange County" due to its sheer cliffs. At the bottom of the canyons Agua Chinon Creek flows under State Route 241 and is impounded by the Agua Chinon Debris Dam, which provides flood control to the valley below. Completed in 1998, the dam has a capacity of 256 acre-feet (316,000 m^{3}) of water.

The middle section of Agua Chinon Creek flows through a culvert underneath the former El Toro Marine Corps Air Station. The redevelopment of the air base as Orange County Great Park includes plans to daylight the creek and restore streambank habitat. This work is proposed to create a wildlife corridor between the Cleveland National Forest and the Laguna Coast wilderness area (Crystal Cove State Park).

Below the Air Base/Great Park the creek continues in a buried channel under the BNSF Railway tracks, Interstate 5 and the Irvine Spectrum Center, and is joined from the left by its main tributary, Borrego Canyon Wash. It emerges as an open channel just a few hundred feet before its confluence with San Diego Creek. The confluence is situated just north of the Interstate 405 near the 405/133 interchange.

== See also ==
- List of rivers of California
- List of rivers of Orange County, California
