= Peters Canyon Wash =

Stream in Orange County, California

Coordinates: 33°41′38″N 117°49′09″W

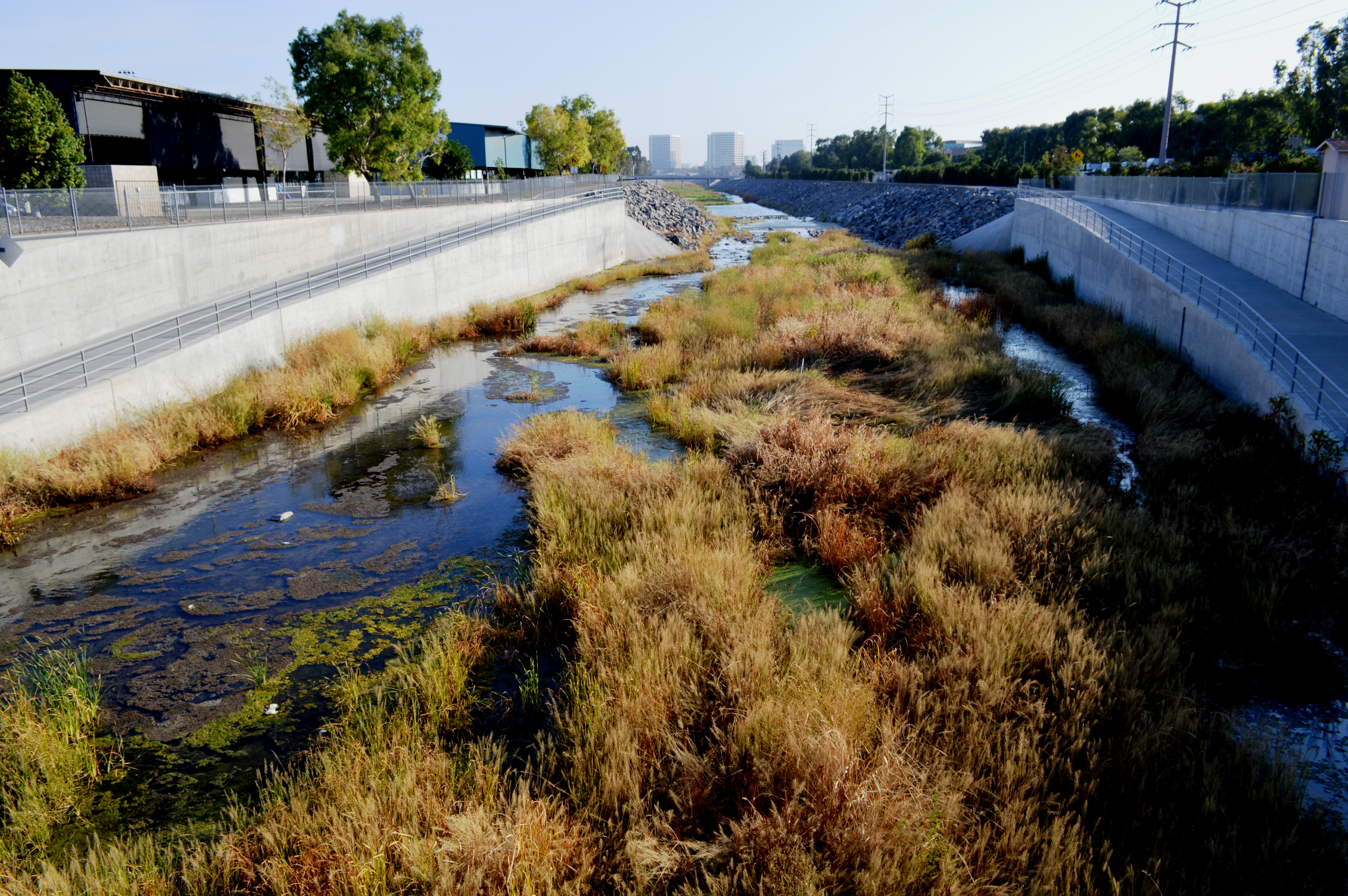
Peters Canyon Wash (2014)

Peters Canyon Wash is a tributary of San Diego Creek in central Orange County in the U.S. state of California.

== Background ==
About 11.8 miles (19.0 km) long north–south, the wash, now mostly channelized, flows in a relatively straight course southwest from the 55-acre (0.22 km^{2}) Peters Canyon Reservoir near the Orange/Tustin borderline to its confluence with San Diego Creek near the Irvine Civic Center Plaza. Less than 5 miles (8.0 km) below this confluence, San Diego Creek empties into Upper Newport Bay. The largest tributary of Peters Canyon is the Santa Ana Gardens Channel (not to be confused with the Santa Ana-Delhi Channel, which flows directly into Upper Newport Bay.)

== Gallery ==
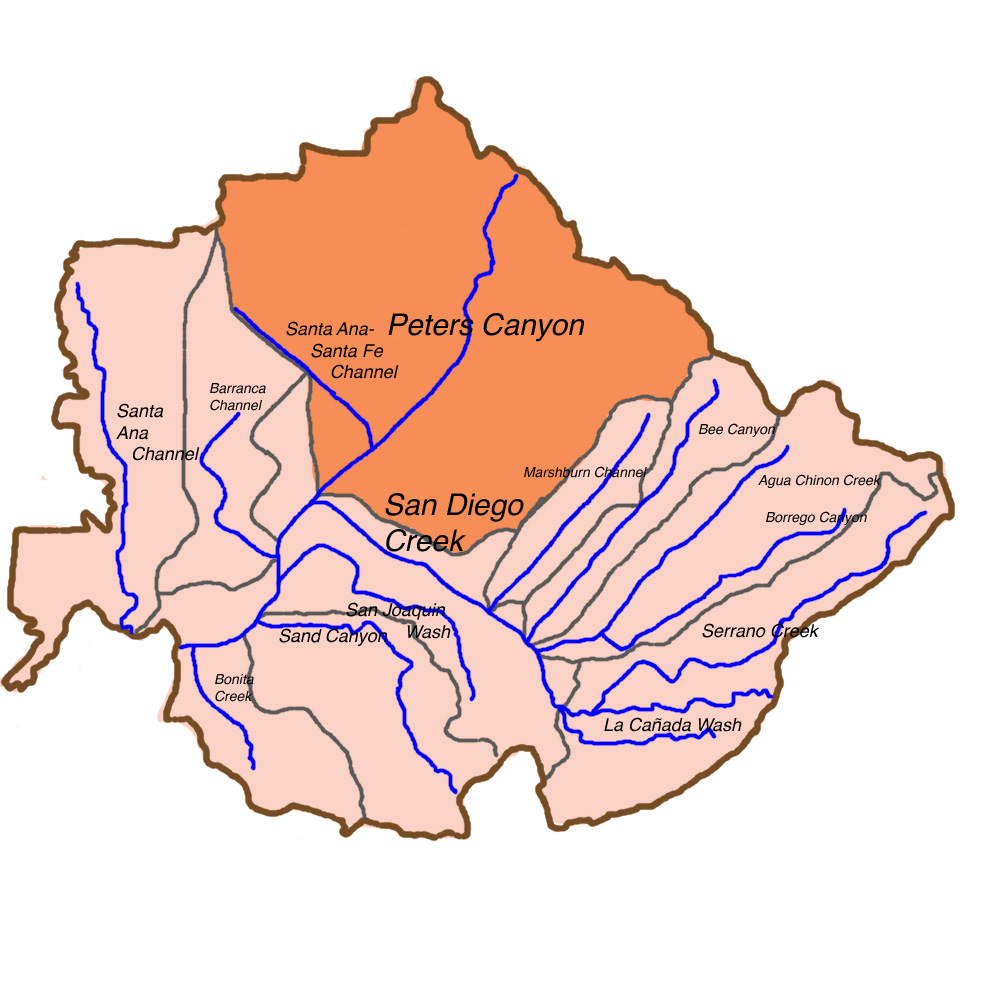
Map of San Diego Creek watershed with Peters Canyon Wash subwatershed highlighted

== See also ==
- List of rivers of Orange County, California
