= San Joaquin Marsh Wildlife Sanctuary =

Wildlife sanctuary in California

Coordinates: 33.663°N 117.844°W

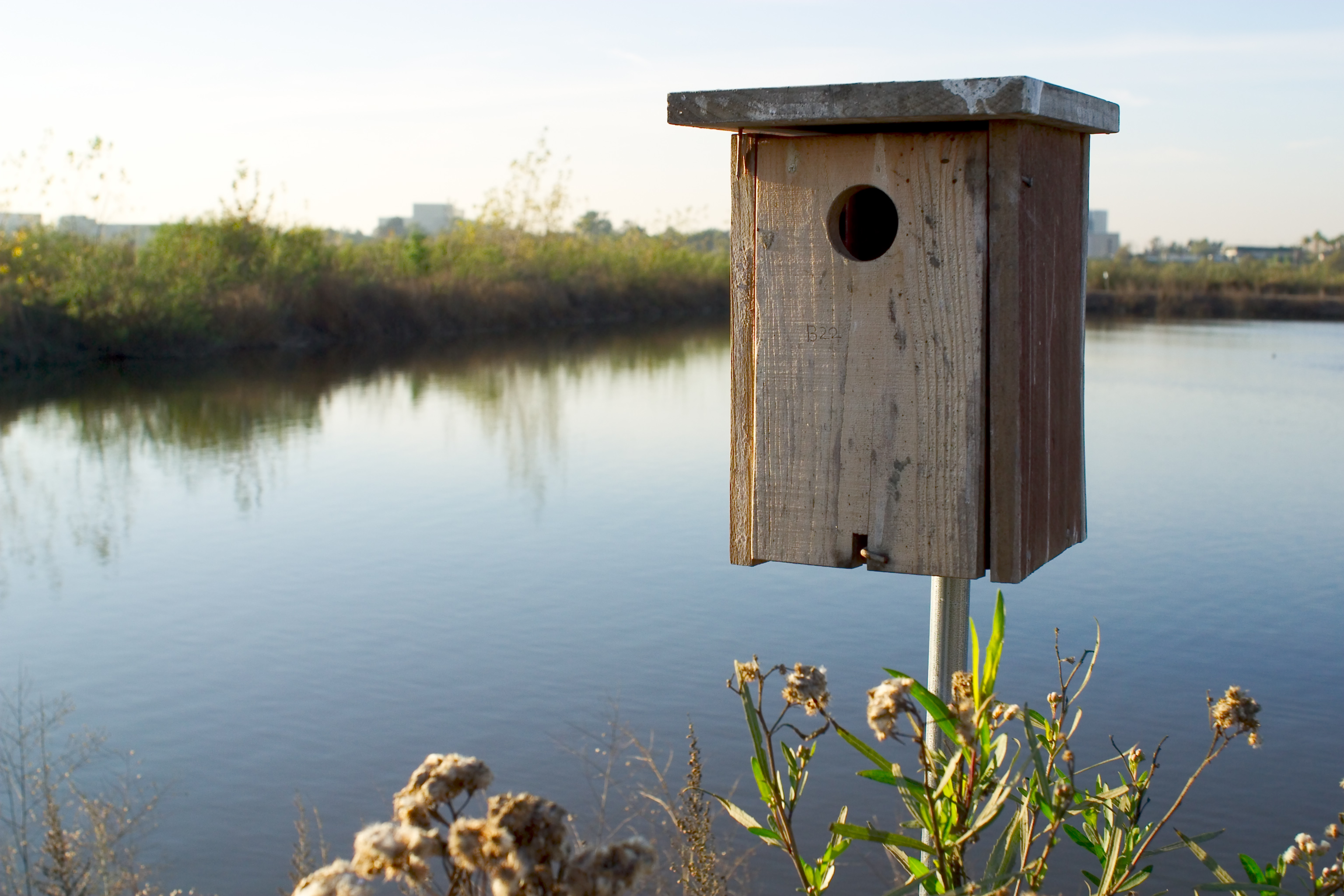
A birdhouse at the SJWS

The San Joaquin Marsh Wildlife Sanctuary is a 300-acre (120 ha; 0.47 sq mi) constructed wetland in Irvine, California, in the flood plain of San Diego Creek just above its outlet into the Upper Newport Bay.

== History ==
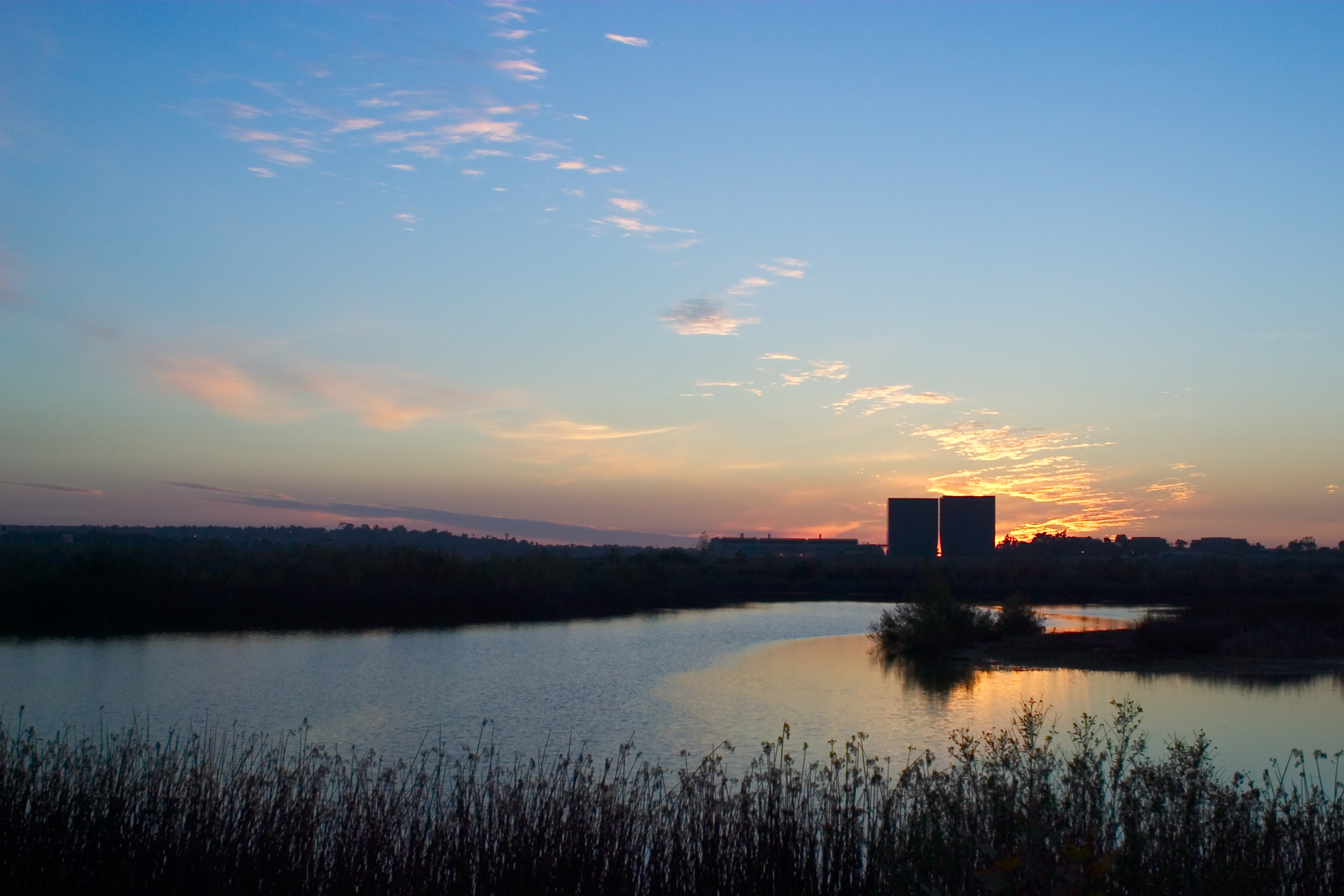
Sunset at the SJWS

The site is owned by the Irvine Ranch Water District; it was used for farmland in the 1950s and 1960s, and (prior to its reconstruction) as a duck hunting range. Restoration of the wetlands began in 1988 and was completed in 2000. Now, the site serves a dual purpose of removing nitrates from the creek water and providing a bird habitat. The water district also operates an adjacent wastewater treatment facility but the treated wastewater does not enter the wildlife sanctuary.

== Description ==
Within the sanctuary, water from the creek percolates through a system of ponds, constructed in 1997 and ringed with bulrushes; the ponds are periodically drained and re-seeded, and the surrounding land is covered with native plants. A small hill at one edge of the site serves as an arboretum for non-native trees, planted for Earth Day in 1990.

=== Wildlife ===
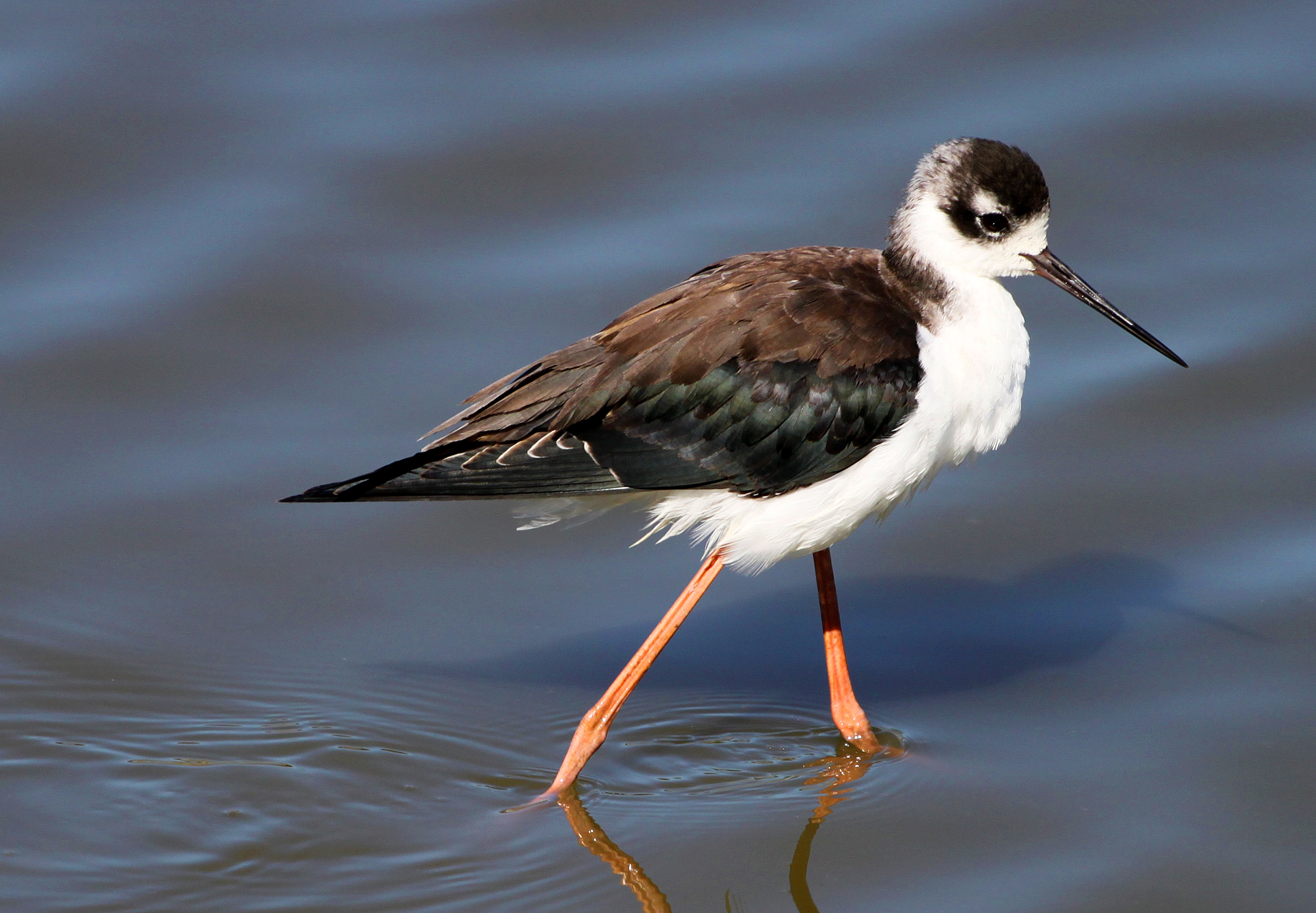
A black-necked stilt at the SJWS

The landscaping has been designed to attract birds, and nesting boxes for the birds have been provided. While waterbirds such as herons, egrets, pelicans, sandpipers, ducks, geese, and kingfishers predominate, monthly censuses have found over 120 species of birds, including terrestrial hawks, swallows, roadrunners, and hummingbirds.

== Public access ==
The sanctuary is open to the public daily during the daytime, and has over 10 miles (16 km) of wheelchair-accessible hiking trails. The facilities also include free parking, restrooms, benches, and trail maps. The Duck Club, a building that was moved to the site in the 1940s and was until 1988 the base for two hunting clubs, serves as a free meeting facility for non-profit organizations. The Audubon Society maintains a chapter office in another building, the former bunkhouse of the Duck Club.
