= San Diego Creek =

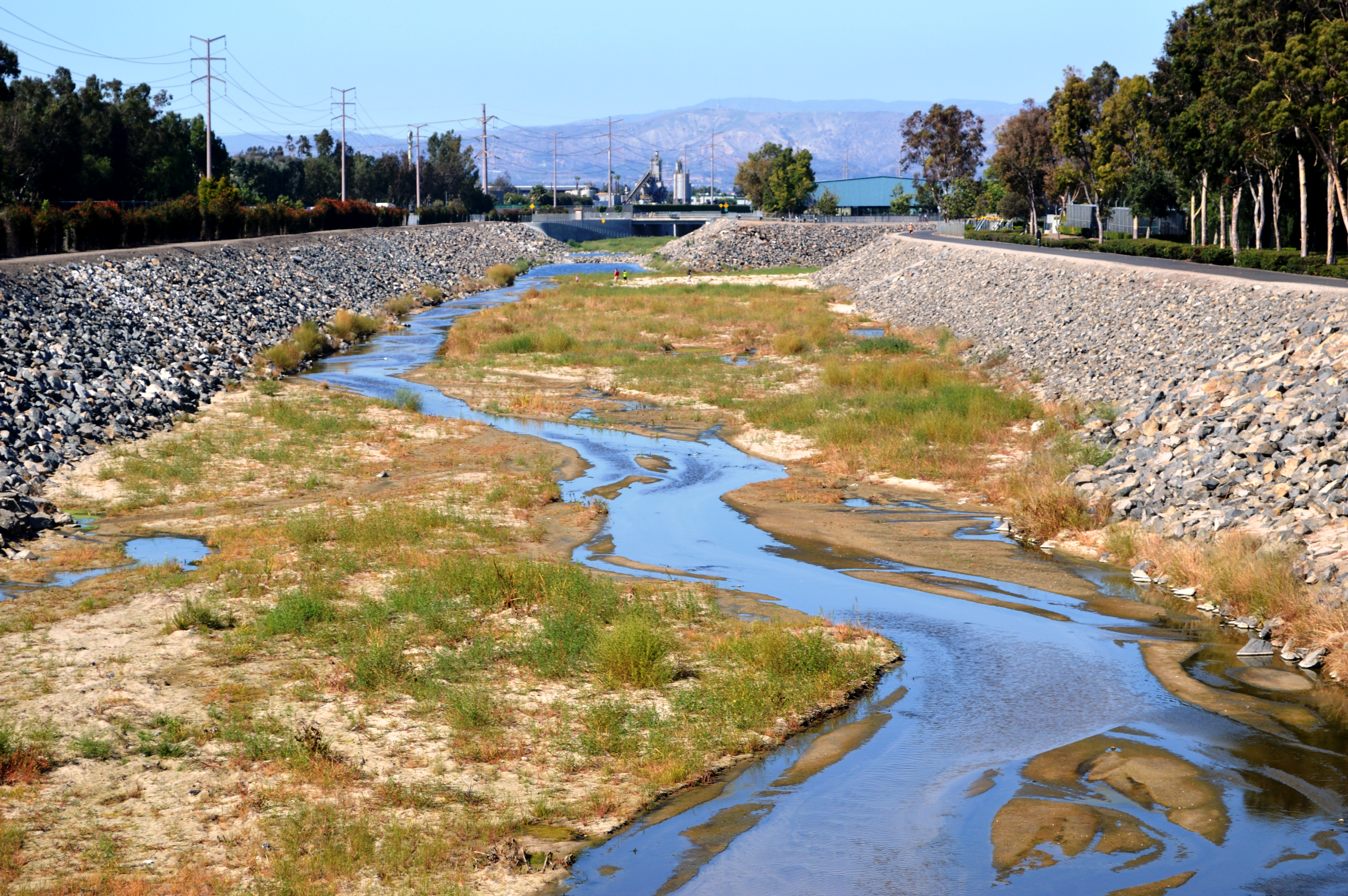
- San Diego Creek at Alton Parkway in Irvine

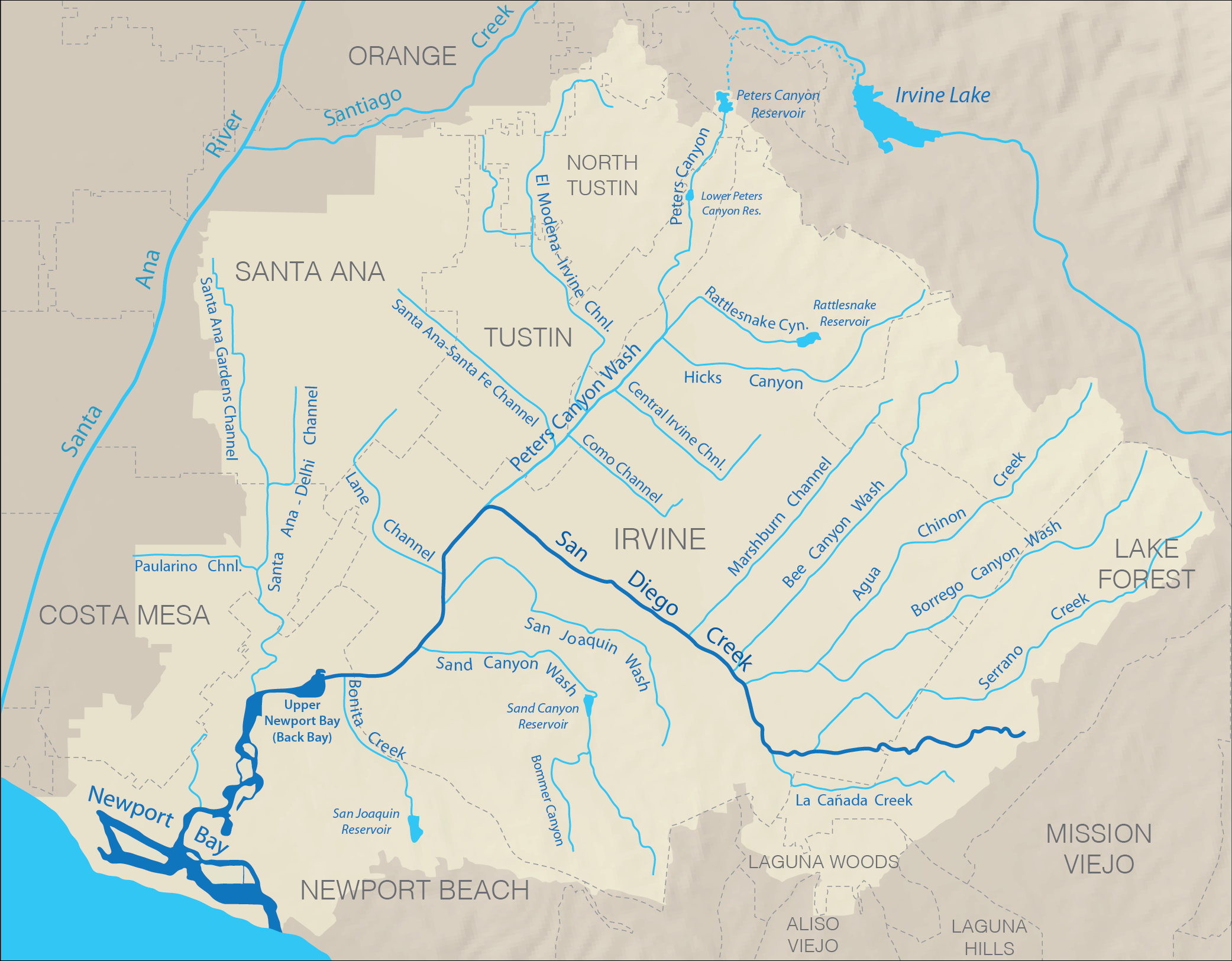
- Map of the Newport Bay watershed, with San Diego Creek highlighted

Location
- Country: United States
- State: California
- Region: Orange County

Physical characteristics
- Source: Santa Ana Mountains
  - location: El Toro, Lake Forest
  - coordinates: 33°38′28″N 117°41′03″W
  - elevation: 700 ft (210 m)
- Mouth: Upper Newport Bay
  - location: Near University of California Irvine
  - coordinates: 33°38′55″N 117°52′28″W
  - elevation: 0 ft (0 m)
- Length: 15 mi (24 km)
- Basin size: 112.2 sq mi (291 km^{2})
- Discharge
  - location: Campus Drive at Irvine, CA
  - average: 61 cu ft/s (1.7 m^{3}/s)
  - minimum: 0 cu ft/s (0 m^{3}/s)
  - maximum: 43,500 cu ft/s (1,230 m^{3}/s)

Basin features
- Tributaries
  - left: La Cañada Wash, San Joaquin Wash, Bonita Creek
  - right: Bee Canyon Wash, Peters Canyon Wash

San Diego Creek is a 16-mile (26 km) urban waterway flowing into Upper Newport Bay in Orange County, California, United States. Its watershed covers 112.2 square miles (291 km^{2}) in parts of eight cities, including Irvine, Tustin, and Costa Mesa. From its headwaters in Laguna Woods the creek flows northwest to its confluence with Peters Canyon Wash, where it turns abruptly southwest towards the bay. Most of the creek has been converted to a concrete flood control channel, but it also provides important aquatic and riparian habitat along its course and its tidal estuary.

The watershed is heavily urbanized with master planned residential and commercial development. It accounts for 80 percent of the whole Newport Bay watershed, which has an urban population of over 700,000. There is also agriculture, high-tech industry and 15,700 acres (64 km^{2}) of designated open space. Orange County Great Park (formerly El Toro Marine Corps Air Station), one of the largest urban parks in the US, is also situated in the watershed.

== Course ==
San Diego Creek rises in the foothills of the Santa Ana Mountains in the residential communities of El Toro, and Lake Forest. Most of its upper course is culverted under subdivisions of El Toro and Irvine. It flows west, fed by tributaries from northern Laguna Canyon and from the Santa Ana Mountains to the north of the creek. After crossing under Interstate 405 near the site of the former Irvine Meadows Amphitheatre, the creek enters an artificial channel and receives Serrano Creek via an underground culvert on the right bank. Directly after the confluence, it passes under California State Route 133. It then flows northwest in a nearly straight course through East Irvine and the City of Irvine, receiving Agua Chinon Creek, Bee Canyon Wash, and the Marshburn Channel from the right. All these tributaries originate in the Santa Ana Mountains and are channelized for most of their lengths through Irvine. A few miles past the confluence with Marshburn Channel, San Diego Creek receives its main tributary, Peters Canyon Creek, on the right bank. The creek begins at Peters Canyon Reservoir in the Santa Ana Mountains and runs about 10 miles (16 km) south-southwest. Although historically it was a smaller tributary, due to present-day flood control purposes, the channel of Peters Canyon is wider than the channel of San Diego Creek when they join.

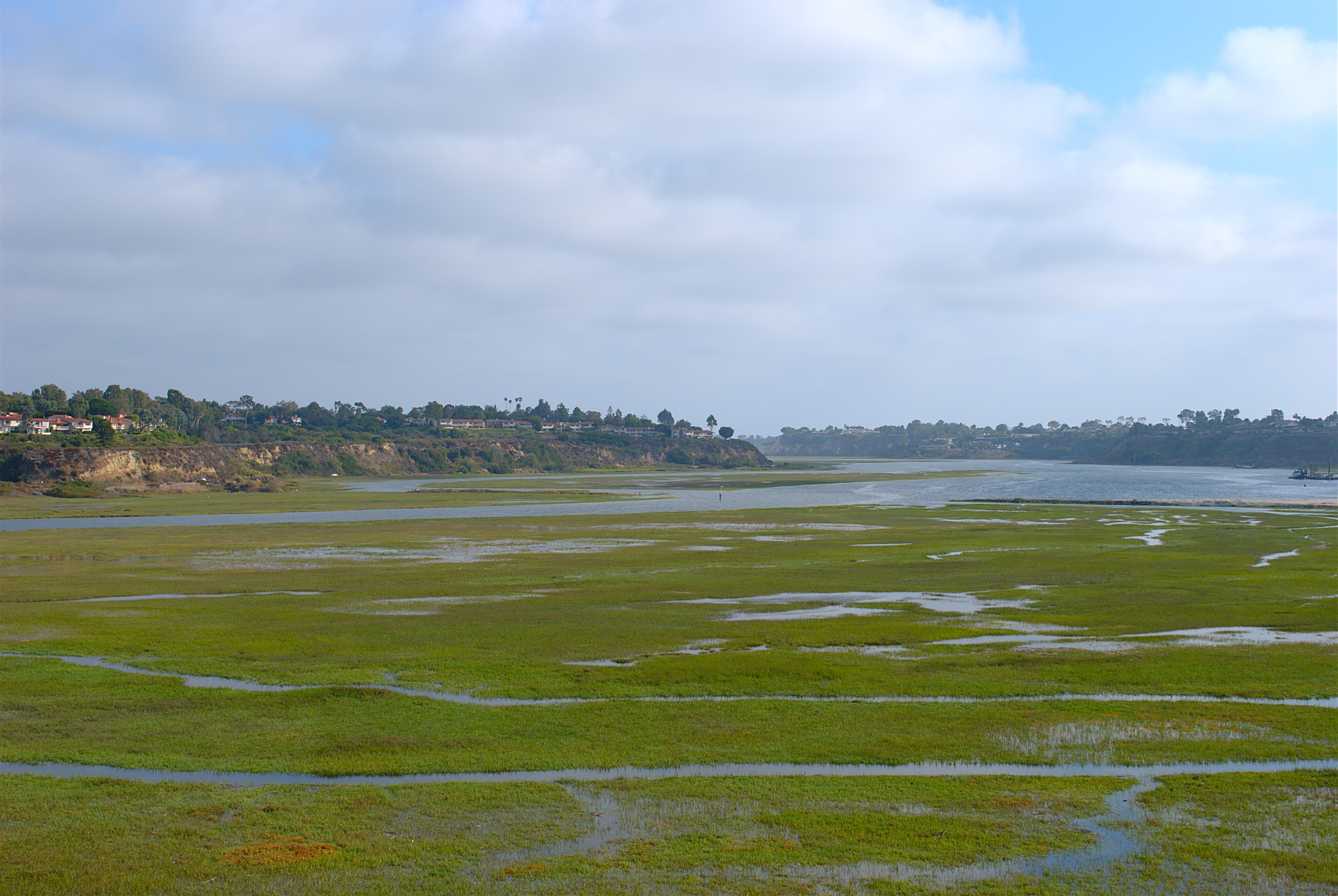
San Diego Creek flows into the Upper Newport Bay.

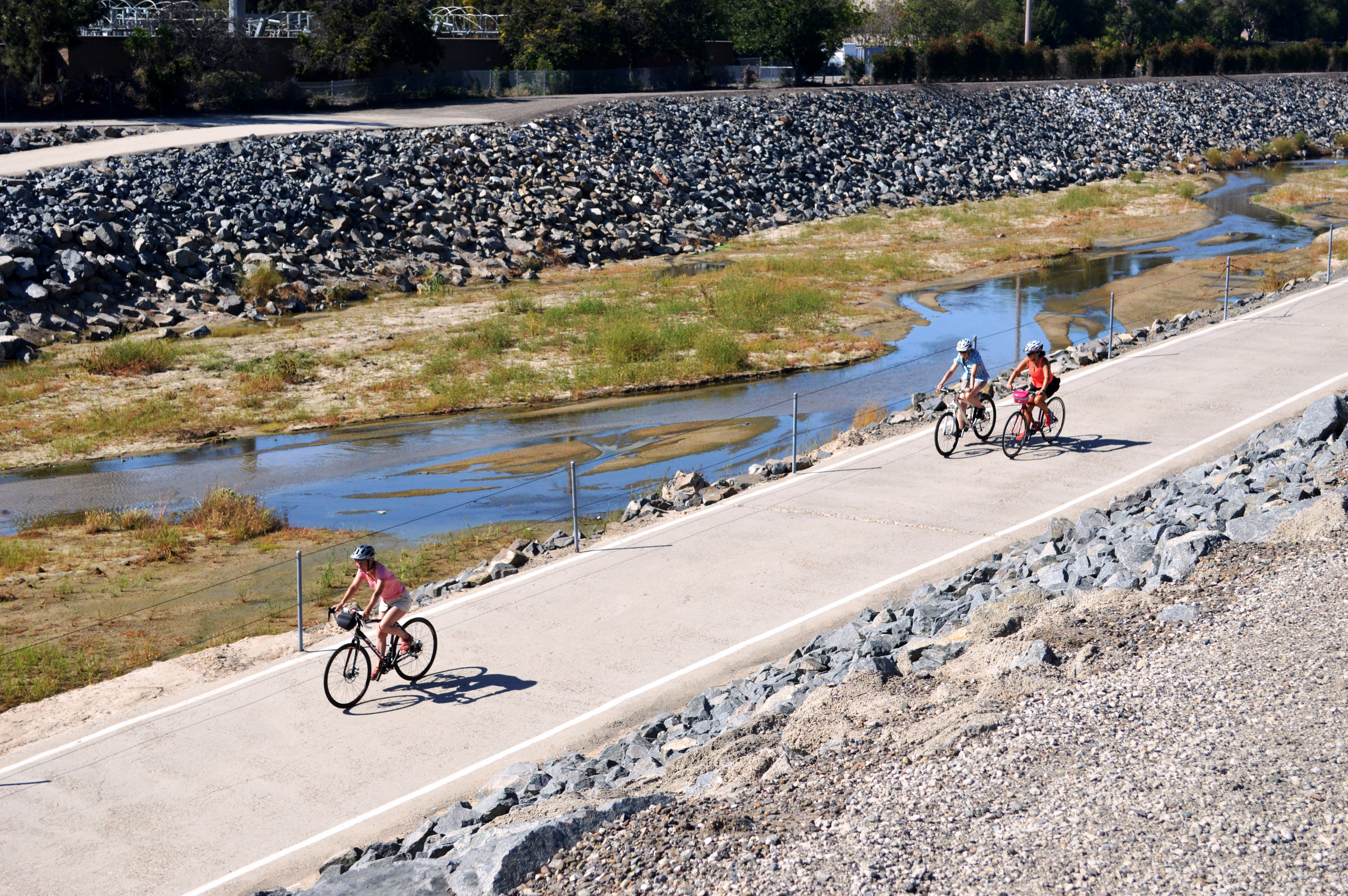
San Diego Creek and San Diego Creek bicycle path

At the confluence with Peters Canyon Creek, San Diego Creek turns abruptly southwest, flowing underneath Interstate 405 for the second time. After flowing beneath the highway, San Diego Creek enters a series of slackwater pools, known as the San Joaquin Marsh, in the San Joaquin Wildlife Sanctuary. The partially man-made marsh stretches approximately 1.4 miles (2.3 km) to where San Diego Creek turns abruptly westward. The creek receives Bonita Creek on the left bank just a few hundred yards upstream frow where it empties into Upper Newport Bay, which eventually discharges into the Pacific Ocean.

== Watershed ==
The San Diego Creek drains a roughly rectangular shaped watershed of 112.2 square miles (291 km^{2}) in central Orange County. Although most of the watershed is located in Irvine, it also includes parts of the incorporated cities of Aliso Viejo, Laguna Hills, Laguna Woods, Lake Forest, Orange, Santa Ana, and Tustin. The watershed forms a flat, highly urbanized basin which is bounded on the north by the Loma Ridge, the "front range" of the Santa Ana Mountains, which separates it from the valley of Santiago Creek. Loma Ridge elevations range from 1,000 to 2,000 feet (300 to 610 m). Santiago Creek flows west to join the Santa Ana River, which drains the coastal plain area immediately west of the San Diego Creek watershed. On the southeast, the San Diego Creek watershed borders that of Aliso Creek and Laguna Canyon Creek. To the south the watershed is bounded by the low San Joaquin Hills which generally rise to elevations of 400 to 600 feet (120 to 180 m).

The San Diego Creek watershed is about 80 percent of the total land draining into Newport Bay – one of the largest estuaries in Southern California – and contributes between 77 and 95 percent of the total fresh water inflow to the bay. The population of the Newport Bay watershed in 2000 was about 705,000, which is projected to grow to 730,000 by 2030. The primary urban land use in the San Diego Creek watershed (not including the rest of Newport Bay) is transportation and communications. Roads (Interstate 5/405, CA 55/73/133/241/261), rail and airports (John Wayne Airport, El Toro Marine Corps Air Station and Tustin Marine Corps Air Station) occupied 36 percent of the land area as of 2000. Residential was second, comprising 15 percent of the watershed. Other land uses are agriculture (23%), parks and open space (23%), commercial (8%), industrial (6%). The amount of agricultural and vacant land is decreasing as new residential neighborhoods are being developed around the periphery of Irvine, though on the other hand, the redevelopment of the El Toro air base as the Orange County Great Park will add to the amount of recreational land.

== Streamflow ==
The dry-season flow of San Diego Creek consists mainly of urban and agricultural drainage runoff. According to the Environmental Protection Agency, average dry-season flow at the mouth is 8 to 15 cubic feet per second (0.23 to 0.42 m^{3}/s), whereas wet-season runoff is 800 to 9,000 cubic feet per second (23 to 255 m^{3}/s). The average annual flow is about 61 cubic feet per second (1.7 m^{3}/s), 44,200 acre-feet (0.0545 km^{3}) per year. An all-time highest flow of 43,500 cubic feet per second (1,230 m^{3}/s) was recorded on December 6, 1997.

The United States Geological Survey has operated three stream gages on San Diego Creek and several on its tributaries. Mean, maximum and minimum flow for the period of record are given in the below table:

Gage number	Location	Period of record	Mean discharge	Max discharge	Min discharge
11048500	San Diego Creek at Culver Drive	1949–1985	6.6 cu ft/s (0.2 m^{3}/s)	10,400 cu ft/s (290 m^{3}/s)	0
11048550	San Diego Creek at Lane Road	1972–1977	18.7 cu ft/s (0.5 m^{3}/s)	4,000 cu ft/s (110 m^{3}/s)	6.1 cu ft/s (0.2 m^{3}/s)
11048555	San Diego Creek at Campus Drive	1978–1985	60.9 cu ft/s (1.7 m^{3}/s)	15,500 cu ft/s (440 m^{3}/s)	14.8 cu ft/s (0.4 m^{3}/s)
11048000	Peters Canyon Wash near Tustin	1930–1940	6.1 cu ft/s (0.2 m^{3}/s)	5,710 cu ft/s (162 m^{3}/s)	0
11048540	Peters Canyon Wash at Barranca Road near Irvine	1982–1985	26.4 cu ft/s (0.7 m^{3}/s)	n/a	n/a
11048200	Agua Chinon Wash near Irvine	2002–2015	0.12 cu ft/s (0.003 m^{3}/s)	382 cu ft/s (10.8 m^{3}/s)	0
11048400	Marshburn Channel near Irvine	2002–2014	( m^{3}/s)	( m^{3}/s)	
11048553	Sand Canyon Creek near Irvine	2001–2014	( m^{3}/s)	( m^{3}/s)	

== History ==
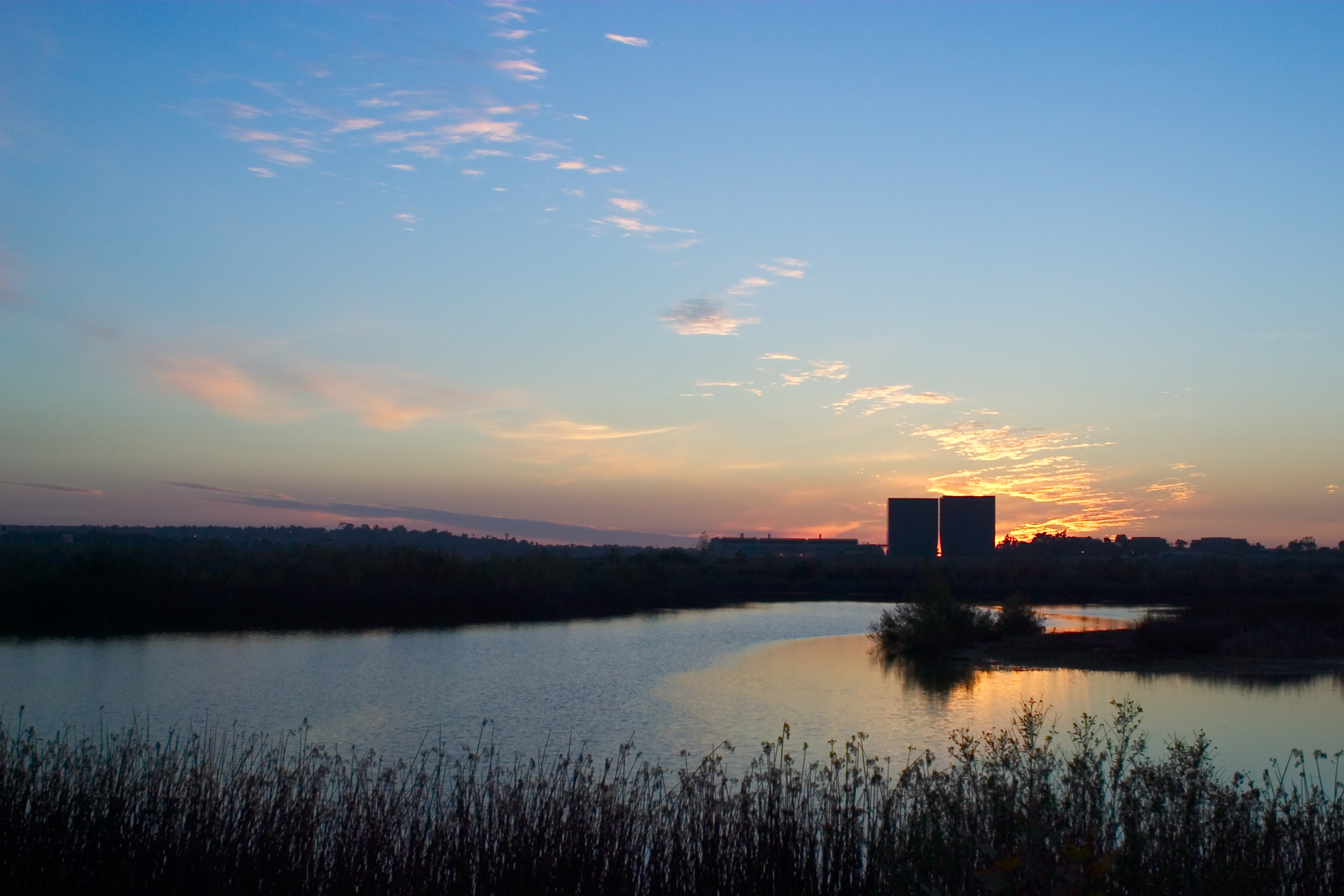
View of San Joaquin Wildlife Sanctuary, one of the few remaining wetlands of the Cienega de las Ranas

Before the 19th century, the San Diego Creek basin consisted of extensive grasslands and seasonal wetlands, which would flood during the winter and spring with storm runoff from the Santa Ana Mountains and San Joaquin Hills. San Diego Creek did not have a well defined channel like it does today, but rather was a series of interconnected sumps and swamps in the lower elevations of the valley. The Santa Ana River, the main waterway of Orange County, would sometimes flow into Newport Bay via what is now the lower part of the San Diego Creek channel. This was observed several times during the 1800s and geological evidence suggests this regularly occurred as early as the Pleistocene period. The area was known as the "Cienega de las Ranas" (Marsh of the Frogs) by early Spanish settlers, for the millions of tree frogs that once inhabited the forested lowlands. Lacking a direct outlet to the sea, the water table in the area was rather high and resulted in many year round artesian springs, which supported a rich variety of native plant and animal life.

Starting about 2,000 years ago, the valley was inhabited by the Gabrielino (Tongva) Native Americans, who depended on the abundant game of the area for their sustenance. A major landmark for the Gabrielino was the Red Hill, located in present-day Tustin at the northern tip of the Cienega de las Ranas. The Gabrielino called it Katuktu, "place of refuge". According to legend, the people had climbed the hill to escape a great flood that covered the plain in ancient times. This has basis in historical events – every few decades, during an extremely wet winter, the Santa Ana River and Santiago Creek to the northwest would change their course and flood large portions of the coastal plain.

During the 18th century, the first Spanish explorers traveled through the region, followed by missionaries (padres), soldiers and settlers. El Camino Real was established to link the chain of missions constructed in California by the Spanish invaders. The Cienega de las Ranas was a major obstacle along the Camino Real and was completely impassable during most winters. In other seasons, those who were traveling from the south by night relied on the singing of the frogs to guide them to Red Hill (called "Cerrito de las Ranas" or Frog Hill by the Spanish), which marked the northern edge of the swamps. The Cienega was part of the Mission San Juan Capistrano lands, which encompassed most of what is now south Orange County. The Spanish used the area largely for cattle ranching, the main contributor to the mission's economy.

After Mexico became independent from Spain, it passed the Secularization Act of 1833, which repossessed the mission land holdings and distributed them to individuals as land grants or ranchos. The Cienega became part of the Rancho Cienega de las Ranas, granted to José Antonio Andres Sepúlveda in 1837. The Rancho Bolsa de San Joaquin was combined with Sepúlveda's original lands in 1842 to create the 48,803-acre (19,750 ha) Rancho San Joaquin. Sepúlveda built a large adobe villa near where the present day San Diego Creek empties into Newport Bay. Shortly after California became part of the United States in 1850, a series of droughts and floods crippled the region, forcing Sepúlveda and other rancheros to sell their holdings. In 1864, portions of the Rancho San Joaquin, and the adjacent Rancho Loma de Santiago and Rancho Santiago de Santa Ana were sold to real estate investor James Irvine, one of the founders of the Irvine Ranch.

During most of the late 19th and early 20th century, the watershed was used for agriculture. Increased runoff from farmlands resulted in extensive erosion, which led to the creation of a stream channel that ran northwestwards into the Santa Ana River channel and thence the Upper Newport Bay. As siltation problems plagued the bay, the Bitter Point Dam was constructed to divert the Santa Ana River to its present mouth at Huntington Beach, leaving the Cienega/San Diego Creek as the main watercourse flowing into the bay.

To support irrigation, farmers drilled numerous wells to tap the region's abundant groundwater. However, with some 1,200 wells in operation by the 1920s, the local wetlands began to disappear as the depth to groundwater increased. Dry farming gradually replaced irrigated farming as it became more expensive to drill new deeper wells. The Irvine Ranch also imported surface water from Santiago Creek starting in the 1930s, when it constructed Santiago Dam to form Irvine Lake, the largest body of fresh water in Orange County. A gunite lined aqueduct diverted water from Irvine Lake to the Upper Peters Canyon Reservoir along Peters Canyon Wash, which stored water for later use on farms.

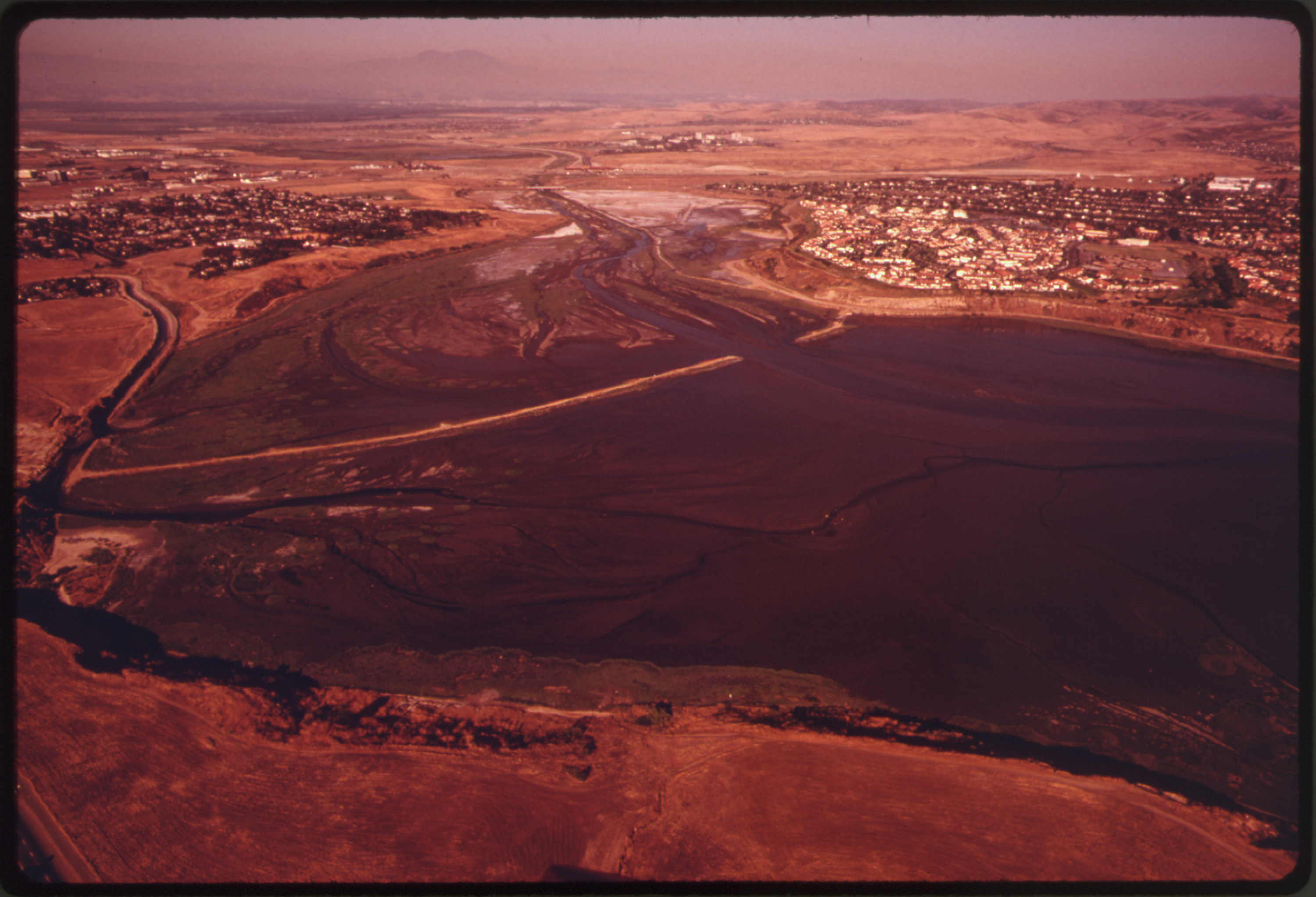
The mouth of San Diego Creek in 1975, after flooding destroyed the Newport salt works

During the 1930s the area around the mouth of San Diego Creek was developed extensively for salt production, with numerous evaporating ponds in the Upper Newport Bay Salt Works. In 1932 the Irvine Conservation Dam, an earthen structure 27 feet (8.2 m) high, was built across San Diego Creek a mile (1.6 km) above the mouth, to capture storm runoff for irrigation, as well as provide flood protection to the salt works. The dam was removed in 1963. Severe flooding in 1969 destroyed the salt works and subsequent floods filled much of the bay with sediment. After a proposal to turn the area into a yacht harbor in the 1970s was thwarted by conservation groups, the bay is now a protected wetlands area.

In 1942, the Marine Corps established two air bases in the watershed. The construction of El Toro Marine Corps Air Station required the burial of a major tributary, the Agua Chinon Creek. Liquid fuel waste disposal at the site between 1942 and 1999, when the base was closed, has resulted in significant contamination of the local aquifer. The second was Marine Corps Air Station Tustin, an airship base, which was built over the deepest part of the Cienega de las Ranas. After World War II, the San Diego Creek watershed experienced rapid urbanization. As the Irvine Company sought to develop the 100,000 acres (40,000 ha) of the former Irvine Ranch, an ambitious effort was made to drain the former Cienega via a series of pumping plants and ditches, and later the construction of the flood control channels that today make up the San Diego Creek system.

In 2014, a cannonball believed to be of Civil War origins was found in the creek. The Lincoln Memorial Shrine Museum in Redlands confirmed that it had been used by the Union army, but there are no records of Union troops ever passing through the area. A likely scenario is that the cannonball was lost by a contingent traveling to Riverside, and washed down the Santa Ana River (which during the 1860s still flowed into Newport Bay) by floods.

== San Joaquin Marsh ==
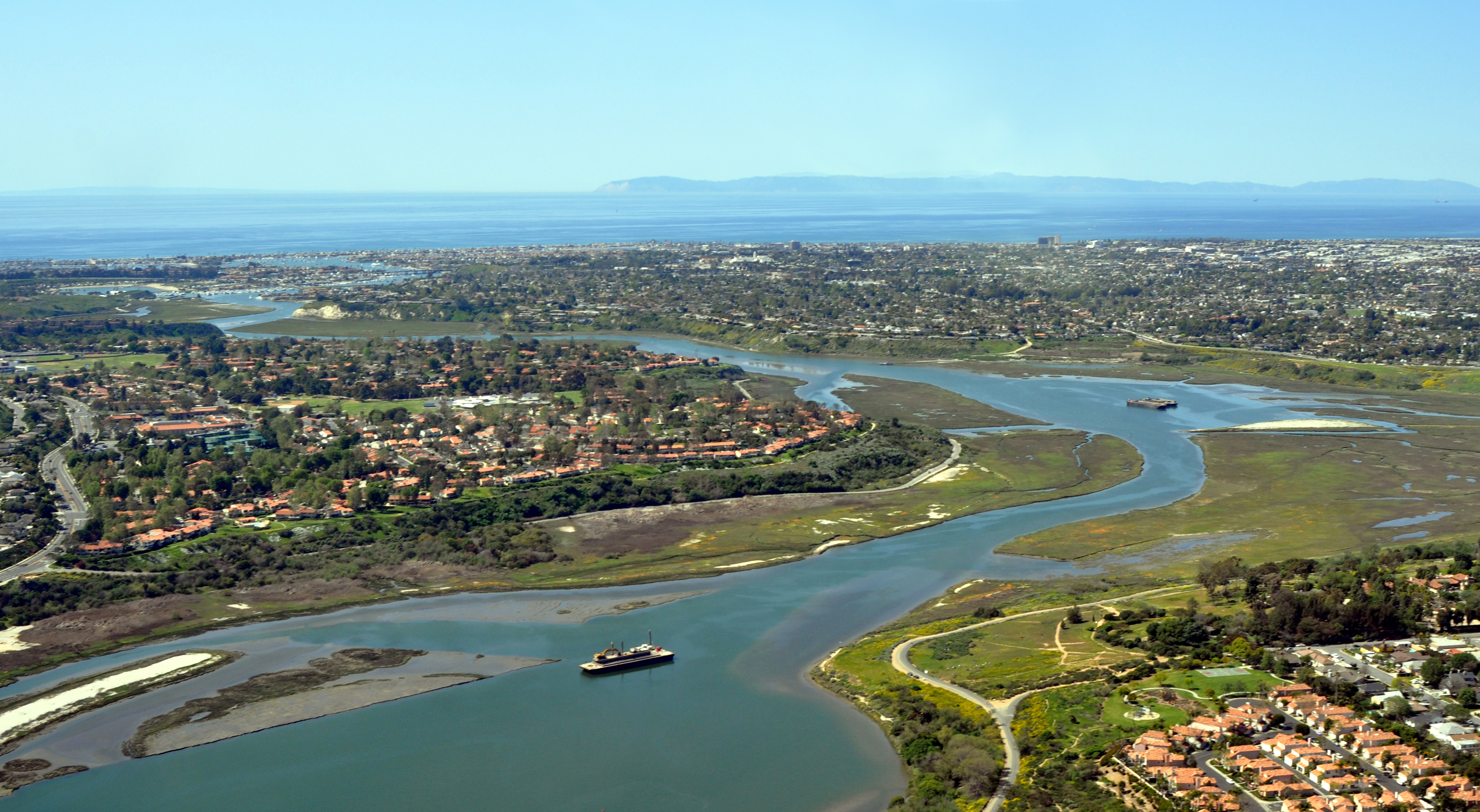
The Back Bay is the estuary of San Diego Creek above Newport Bay

The San Joaquin Marsh is a long and narrow, approximately 500-acre (2.0 km^{2}) constructed wetland that occupies the lower 1.4 miles (2.3 km) of the San Diego Creek stream course adjacent to the UC Irvine campus. It consists of about a dozen ponds fed by San Diego Creek, which is impounded by a series of low rock dams. The marsh is located in the ancient, now abandoned bed of the Santa Ana River which once flowed into Upper Newport Bay. It provides habitat for about 200 bird species, including 100 migrating species and 20 nesting species. The marsh helps to clean polluted runoff in San Diego Creek before it flows into the estuary of Newport Bay. Until the early 2000s, the area was heavily contaminated with the pesticides diazinon and chlorpyrifos, which were successfully removed from the creek after the Environmental Protection Agency implemented best management practices in the watershed.

Currently the largest freshwater marsh in Orange County, the San Joaquin was once severely polluted and degraded, having been used first as the Newport salt works and then as farmland. During the 1950s and 1960s, San Diego Creek followed a much shorter, channelized course to the bay, bypassing the marsh entirely. In 1972 the Irvine Company leased the marsh to hunting clubs, which restored the creek's original, longer course to the bay and built levees to create duck ponds. In 1988 ownership was transferred back to the Irvine Ranch Water District. Starting in 1996 large scale habitat restoration work was carried out, with 43 acres (17 ha) restored by 1997 and a further 24 acres (9.7 ha) by 2000. The old diversion channel is still in place; today, it is mainly used for flood control.

In July 2000, the City of Irvine, which owns 300 acres (1.2 km^{2}) of the marsh in the San Joaquin Wildlife Sanctuary, contributed a further $1.5 million to its restoration, along with contributions from the Audubon Society and the State of California. The remaining 200 acres (0.81 km^{2}) belong to the University of California and have been designated as the San Joaquin Freshwater Marsh Reserve.

== Tributaries ==
From north to south, the named tributaries of San Diego Creek are the La Cañada Channel (flowing from Laguna Canyon), Serrano Creek, Agua Chinon Creek, Bee Canyon Wash, Como Drain, Lyon Drain, Marshburn Channel, Coyote Canyon Channel, Peters Canyon Wash, Barranca Channel, Lane Channel, San Joaquin Wash, Sand Canyon Wash, and Bonita Creek.

The creek also has a few tributaries that provide the outflow for several water supply and flood control reservoirs in the San Joaquin Hills and Santa Ana Mountains. From source to mouth, these are La Cañada Channel (fed by Laguna Reservoir), Bee Canyon (two unnamed reservoirs), Peters Canyon Wash (Peters Canyon Reservoir), San Joaquin Wash (San Joaquin Reservoir) and Sand Canyon Wash (Sand Canyon and Strawberry Valley reservoirs).

The largest sub-tributaries include Borrego Canyon Wash (to Agua Chinon Creek), Round Canyon (to Bee Canyon Wash), Santa Ana-Santa Fe Channel (to Peters Canyon) and Culver Drain (to San Joaquin Wash). There are many other ephemeral watercourses and drains in the watershed, but they are too numerous to list entirely.

== Ecology and restoration ==
San Diego Creek supports a diverse riparian ecosystem in Southern California. Native vegetation along the creek includes willow (Salix lasiolepis), mule fat (Baccharis salicifolia), and coastal sage scrub, including California buckwheat (Eriogonum fasciculatum) and coastal prickly pear (Opuntia littoralis). These plants provide important habitat for wildlife such as the coastal California gnatcatcher (Polioptila californica) and the cactus wren (Campylorhynchus brunneicapillus) which use the creek corridor as part of the Pacific Flyway. Other birds which benefit from the riparian habitat are the federally endangered Least Bell's Vireo (Vireo bellii pusillus) which is a key target species for restoration.

Restoration and monitoring projects by the Irvine Ranch Water District, Orange County Public Works (OCPW), Orange County Construction, and Irvine Ranch Conservancy focus on improving water quality, reducing urban runoff, and re-establishing native plant cover along the creek. A major challenge is the presence of invasive species, such as the destructive Giant Reed (Arundo donax), which are targeted for removal to restore natural habitat function. To improve water quality, the Irvine Ranch Water District utilizes a Natural Treatment System (NTS) of constructed wetlands to filter pollutants, including excess nutrients and indicator bacteria, before flows reach Upper Newport Bay. Furthermore, the OCPW plans on removing sediment buildup coming from debris from roads or driveways, which can cause flooding and reduced water quality upon reaching water channels.

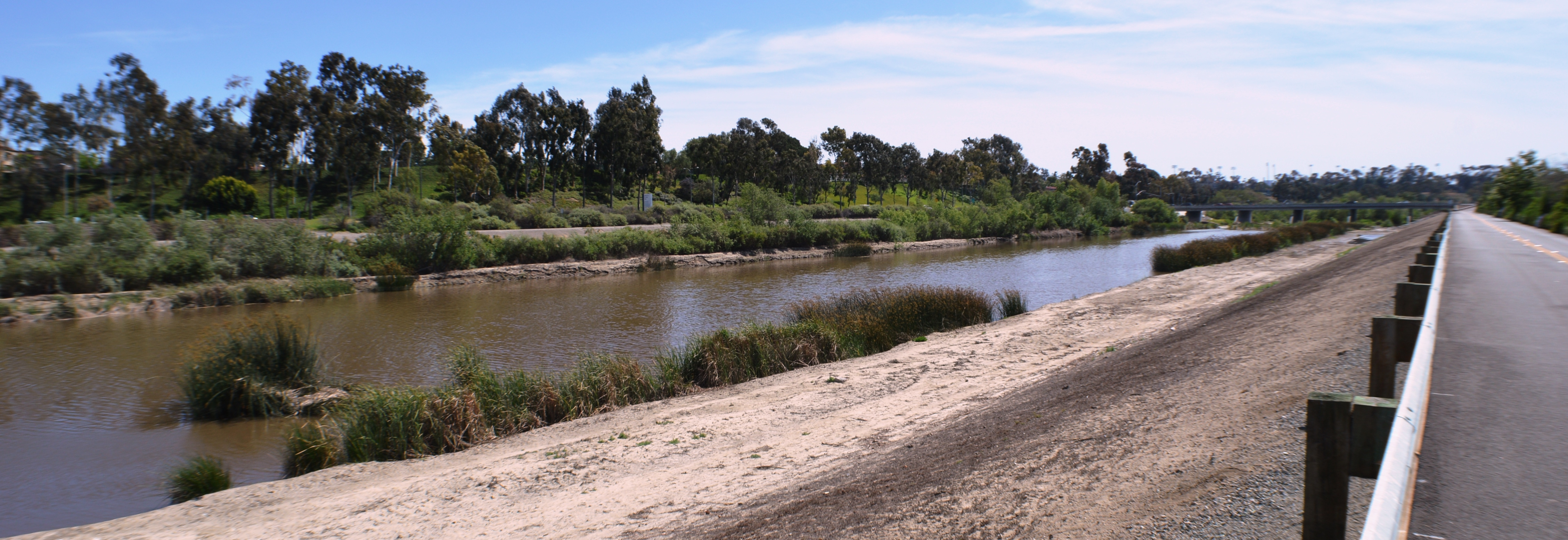
San Diego Creek in the San Joaquin Wildlife Sanctuary

== See also ==
- San Diego Creek bicycle path
- List of rivers of Orange County, California
