= San Joaquin Wash =

Stream in Orange County, California

Coordinates: 33°38′50″N 117°51′43″W

The San Joaquin Wash is a stream in Irvine, Orange County, California, and is a tributary of San Diego Creek. Its watershed includes part of the northern San Joaquin Hills, for which it is named. It flows west-northwest for about 6 miles (9.7 km) before joining San Diego Creek near University of California, Irvine.

== See also ==
- List of rivers of Orange County, California
