= Bee Canyon Wash =

Stream in California

Bee Canyon Wash is a stream located in the U.S. state of California. It is located in Orange County. It is located at the coordinates 33.6541883°N, -117.7586647°W. It is located close to East Irvine, Shady Canyon and Bommer Canyon.
