= Upper Newport Bay =

Coastal wetland in Newport Beach, Southern California

Coordinates: 33°38′29″N 117°53′08″W

Map of Upper Newport Bay

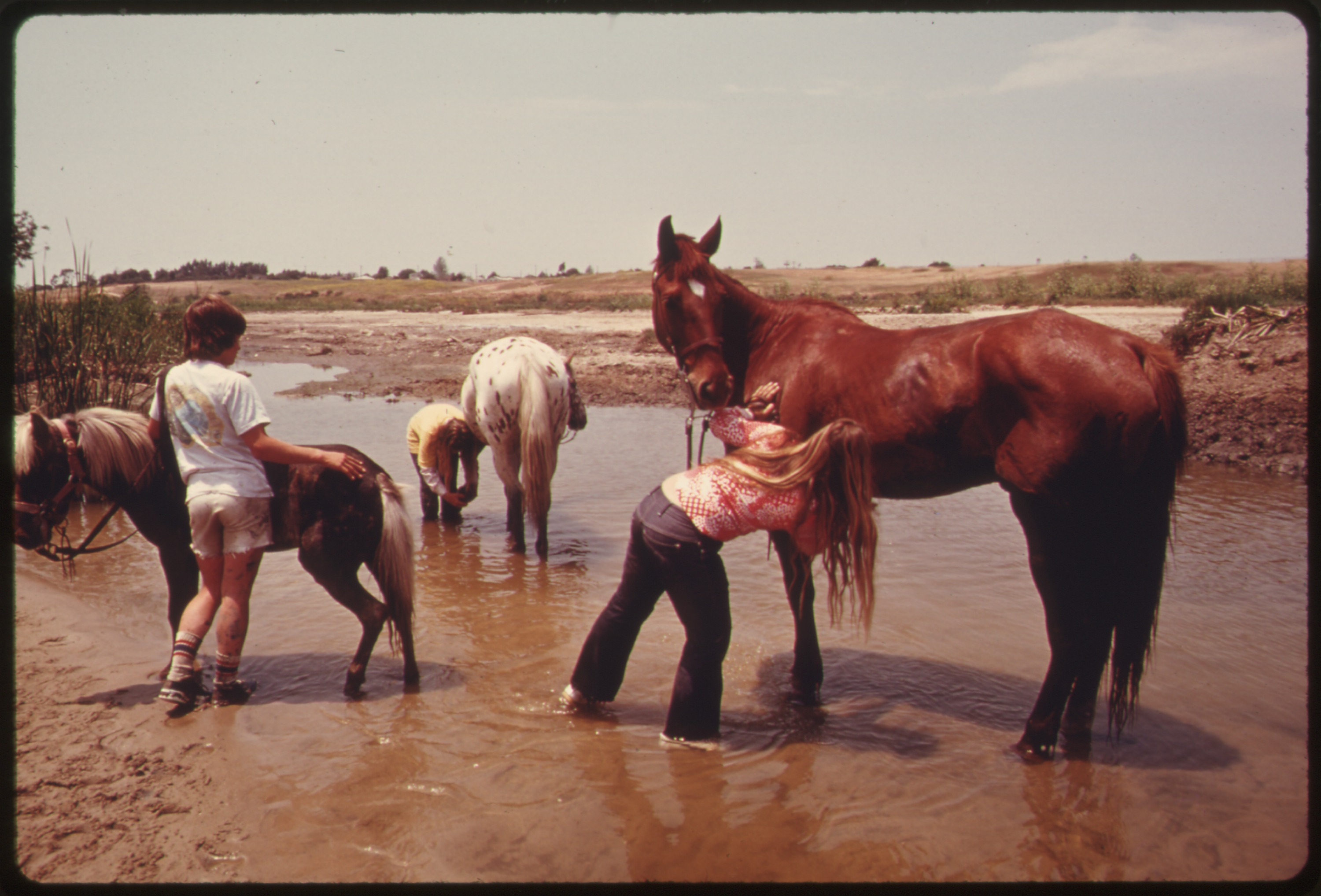
Youngsters wash their horses in Upper Newport Bay, 1975. Photo by Charles O'Rear.

Upper Newport Bay (connected to Newport Harbor via "The Back Bay") is a large coastal wetland (an estuary) in Newport Beach, California, and a major stopover for birds on the Pacific Flyway. Dozens of species, including endangered ones, can be observed here. Upper Newport Bay Nature Preserve and Ecological Reserve represent approximately 1,000 acres (4 km^{2}) of open space. Upper Newport Bay was purchased by the state in 1975 for its Fish and Wildlife Department's Ecological Reserve System. In 1985 the upper west bluffs and lands surrounding the bay became part of an Orange County regional park, which offers outdoor activities such as bird-watching, jogging, bicycling, hiking, and kayaking. The Peter and Mary Muth Interpretive Center, located at 2301 University Drive, is open to the public. An organization known as the Newport Bay Conservancy (NBC) provides volunteers to answer visitors' questions and guide them through the various activities.

The bay is recognized for protection by the California Bays and Estuaries Policy.

The main tributary of Upper Newport Bay is San Diego Creek, which flows past the San Joaquin Wildlife Sanctuary before entering the bay. The bay is connected to the Pacific Ocean through the lower Newport Bay, the harbor of Newport Beach.
