= California State Route 39 =

State highway in California

State Route 39
- SR 39 highlighted in red; gaps indicate the unconstructed or relinquished portions

Route information
- Maintained by Caltrans
- Length: 54.19 mi (87.21 km) SR 39 is broken into pieces due to an unconstructed portion, and the length does not reflect the gap. Also, portions of SR 39 have been relinquished to or are otherwise maintained by local or other governments, and are not included in the length.
- Existed: 1934–present
- Restrictions: The segment from north of Crystal Lake Road to its northern terminus at SR 2 is closed indefinitely to public highway traffic

Southern segment
- South end: SR 1 in Huntington Beach
- Major intersections: I-405 at the Huntington Beach–Westminster line; SR 22 in Westminster; SR 91 Buena Park; I-5 in Buena Park
- North end: Whittier Boulevard / Harbor Boulevard in La Habra

Northern segment
- South end: I-10 / CR N8 in West Covina
- Major intersections: I-210 in Azusa
- North end: SR 2 in Angeles National Forest

Location
- Country: United States
- State: California
- Counties: Orange, Los Angeles

Highway system
- State highways in California; Interstate; US; State; Scenic; History; Pre‑1964; Unconstructed; Deleted; Freeways
| ← SR 38 | → I-40 |

State Route 39 (SR 39) is a state highway in the U.S. state of California that travels through Orange and Los Angeles counties. Its southern terminus is at Pacific Coast Highway (SR 1), in Huntington Beach. SR 39's northern terminus is at Islip Saddle on Angeles Crest Highway (SR 2) in the Angeles National Forest, but its northernmost 4.5-mile (7.2 km) segment (including the connection with SR 2) has been closed to public highway traffic since 1978 due to a massive mud and rockslide.

Officially, the highway is broken into pieces. Caltrans has not adopted or signed the segment between La Habra and West Covina. Caltrans has also relinquished control of segments of SR 39 within the cities of Anaheim in 2024, Buena Park in 2013, Azusa by 2010, Covina by 2010, and West Covina by 2013, although some maps and signs may still mark SR 39 as continuous through these cities. Since 2001, a portion of SR 39 that runs through the city of Stanton has also been considered for relinquishment to the city.

Major places of interest along SR 39 are Knott's Berry Farm, an amusement park; Adventure City, another amusement park targeted for children; Huntington Beach, a local beach; a Medieval Times location; the Buena Park Auto Center; and the Westridge Golf Course in La Habra.

== Route description ==
Due to its fragmented nature and piecemeal relinquishments, the California Streets and Highways Code defines Route 39 across several subdivisions of section 339, last amended by the California State Legislature in 2018, as follows:

Route 39 is from:
(a) Route 1 near Huntington Beach to the southern city limit of Buena Park.
(b) Route 5 in Buena Park to Route 72 in La Habra via Beach Boulevard.
(c) Beach Boulevard to Harbor Boulevard in La Habra via Whittier Boulevard.
(d) Whittier Boulevard in La Habra to Route 2 via Harbor Boulevard to the vicinity of Fullerton Road, then to Azusa Avenue, Azusa Avenue to San Gabriel Canyon Road, San Gabriel Avenue southbound between Azusa Avenue and San Gabriel Canyon Road, and San Gabriel Canyon Road, other than the portion of the segment described by this subdivision that is within the city limits of Azusa, Covina, and West Covina.

While control of the former portions of Route 39 have been relinquished by the state to the cities of Azusa, Buena Park, Covina, and West Covina, subdivision (e) further mandates that those cities must still "maintain within their respective jurisdictions signs directing motorists to the continuation of Route 39." Subdivision (f) also permits the state to relinquish the segment within Anaheim (which occurred in 2024).

SR 39 begins at SR 1 (Pacific Coast Highway) in Huntington Beach and runs north along Beach Boulevard to Whittier Boulevard in La Habra, with the exception of two stretches: the segment between Stanton Avenue and Interstate 5 was relinquished to the city of Buena Park in 2013, and the segment between the Stanton–Anaheim line and Stanton Avenue was relinquished to the city of Anaheim in 2024. SR 39 briefly enters La Mirada and Los Angeles County near Rosecrans Avenue, then goes back into Orange County at the La Habra–La Mirada line. SR 39 then turns east along Whittier Boulevard to Harbor Boulevard, taking over a former segment of SR 72, while the remaining segment SR 72 remains on Whittier Boulevard west of Beach Boulevard.

The segment from the Whittier–Harbor intersection to the San Bernardino Freeway (Interstate 10) in West Covina has not been transferred from local control to Caltrans (as indicated by an "END 39" sign at the Whittier–Harbor intersection). Under the aforementioned section 339, subdivision (d), of the California Streets and Highways Code, the traversable route would take SR 39 along Harbor Boulevard north, Fullerton Road north, and then Colima Road west to Azusa Avenue in Hacienda Heights. SR 39 would then continue north on Azusa Avenue through the City of Industry to Interstate 10.

Adopted SR 39 then resumes and signs for SR 39 appear on Azusa Avenue from its junction with Interstate 10 in West Covina, and through Covina to First Street in the city of Azusa just north of Interstate 210. The route then runs as a couplet (composed of two one-way streets), with northbound traffic on Azusa Avenue, and southbound traffic on San Gabriel Avenue, to Sierra Madre Avenue where the two one-way streets converge to form San Gabriel Canyon Road. Although Caltrans relinquished the entire route in the cities of West Covina, Covina, and Azusa, SR 39 shields may remain on this segment of the highway.

State maintenance of SR 39 begins again along San Gabriel Canyon Road at the north limit of Azusa. The highway winds through the San Gabriel Mountains in the Angeles National Forest for 22.6 miles (36.4 km) until it reaches a gate barring the road 0.25 miles (0.40 km) north of Crystal Lake Road in the Crystal Lake Recreation Area. The last few miles of the route, including the connection to SR 2, are closed to public highway traffic, as the roadbed has been closed since 1978, due to major rock slides that year and again in 2005 which damaged more of the remaining roadbed.

A replacement of the section north of East Fork Road, in the next canyon to the east, was partly built in 1936 and 1961, but was never completed. The section includes one bridge and two tunnels; it was never used by automobile or truck traffic. In one local hiking guide the section is identified as the "Road to Nowhere" and the "Convict Road", although the official name is the Shoemaker Road and was planned to be an escape route in times of nuclear warfare. A ca. 1967 replacement, much closer to the existing alignment, was also stopped prematurely, and so the middle of the segment between East Fork Road and the closure gate, with its many hairpin curves, still exists.

SR 39 is part of the California Freeway and Expressway System, and the urban portions of SR 39 are part of the National Highway System, a network of highways that are considered essential to the country's economy, defense, and mobility by the Federal Highway Administration. SR 39 is eligible for the State Scenic Highway System, but it is not officially designated as a scenic highway by the California Department of Transportation.

== History ==
=== La Habra to West Covina connection ===
Although defined to be a continuous route in the California Streets and Highway Code, the segment from Whittier Boulevard in La Habra to West Covina is not officially adopted or signed by Caltrans. This is indicated at the intersection of Whittier Boulevard and Harbor Boulevard, where an "END 39" sign appears.

Prior to the present before reaching Harbor Boulevard, SR 39 continued north from Whittier Boulevard along Hacienda Road to the Los Angeles/Orange County line then north on Hacienda Boulevard and Glendora Avenue to US 60, 70, and 99 (Garvey Avenue, now Interstate 10) in West Covina. It then continued east with US 60, 70, and 99 to Azusa Avenue where it turned north to follow the present alignment as described beginning in the fourth paragraph of the preceding section. The Hacienda Glendora segment can still be seen as Route 39 on some maps.

Prior to 1991, Harbor Boulevard became Fullerton Road northbound from the Los Angeles/Orange County Line, through the Puente Hills as a one-lane winding road into Rowland Heights. However, due to complaints of nearby residents due to the increased volume of traffic, a straighter, wider stub was built slightly to the east, and was named Harbor Boulevard. This route is under consideration to become part of SR 39 to complete the gap.

The new Harbor Boulevard was opened to the public early in 1992, and is now the primary corridor between Orange County and Rowland Heights, although the original winding Fullerton Road segment still exists as a strictly residential street.

The definition of Route 39 in the California Streets and Highway Code was thus changed accordingly, and the traversable route to fill the Route 39 gap would be via Harbor Boulevard north, Fullerton Road north, and then Colima Road west to Azusa Avenue in Hacienda Heights. Route 39 would then continue north on Azusa Avenue through the City of Industry to Interstate 10 in West Covina. This segment however has yet to be officially designated by Caltrans.

=== Closed northern segment to Islip Saddle ===
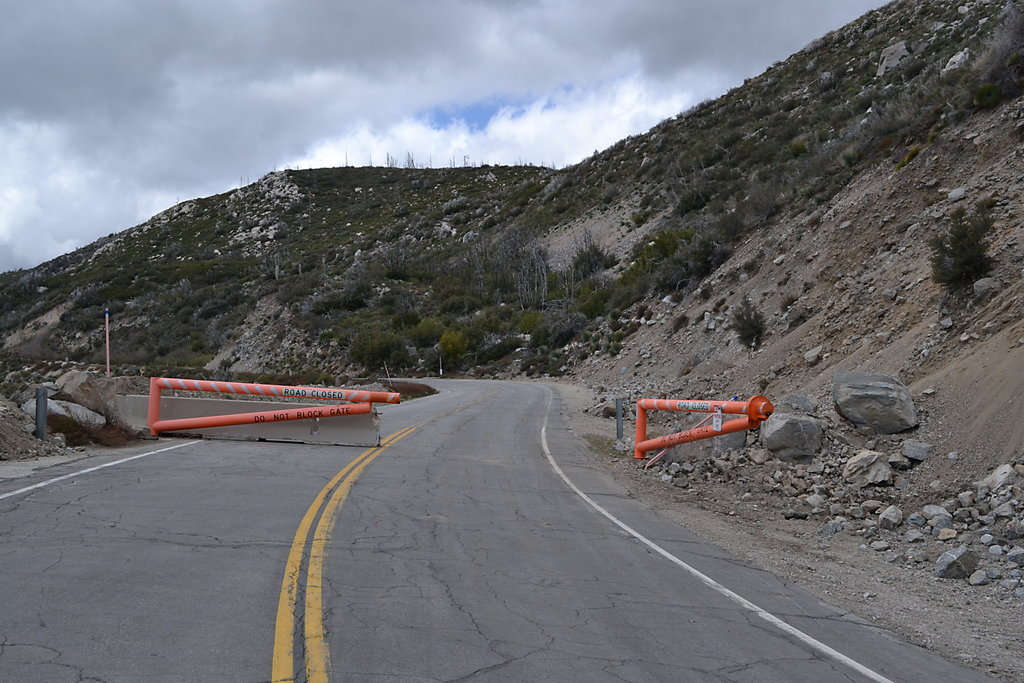
SR 39 closure in the San Gabriel Mountains

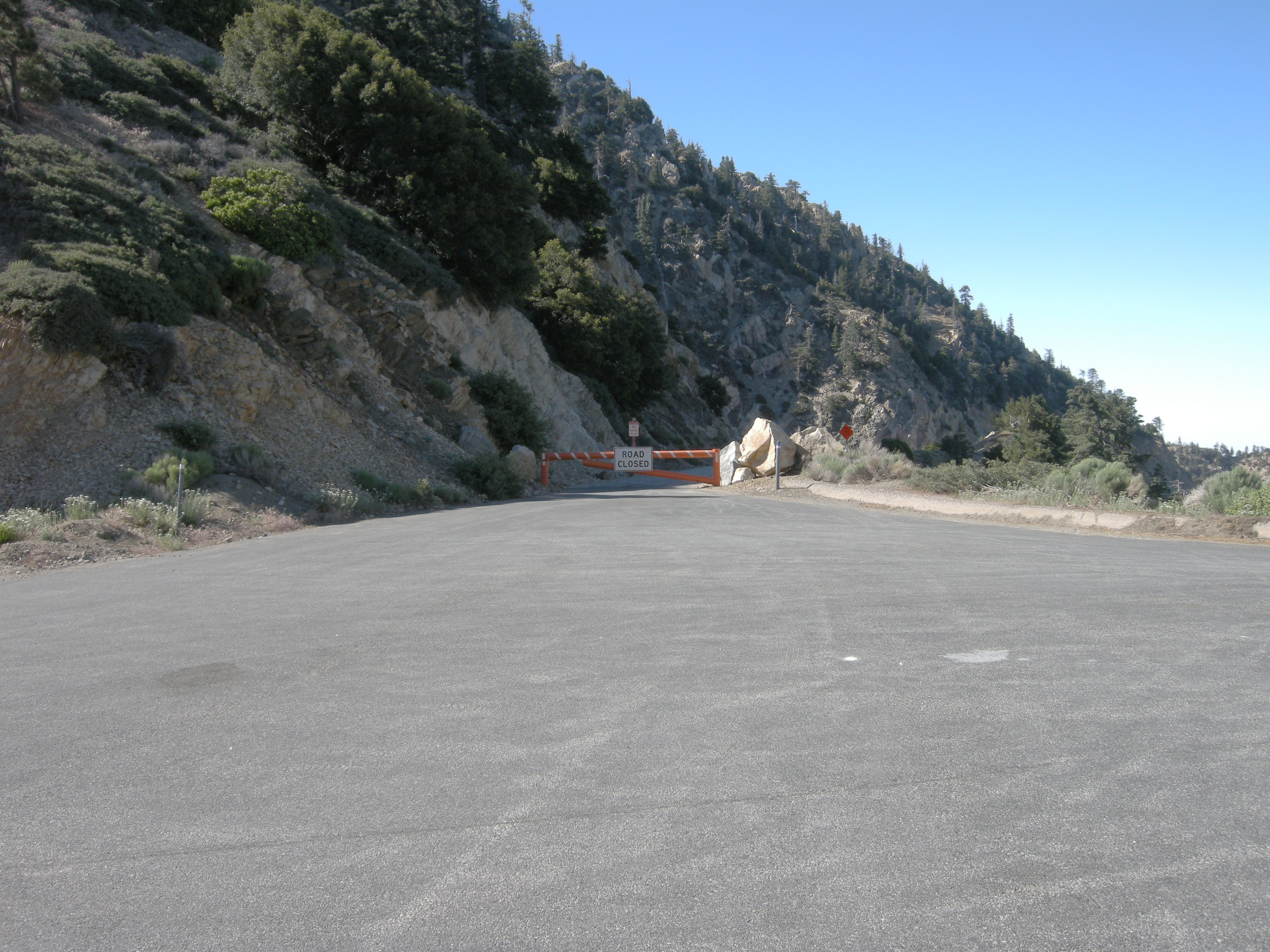
Locked gate at northern terminus of Highway 39

SR-39 closed and incomplete section is between the black circles; the ca. 1967 reconstruction is shown in blue

After the road's completion, there were frequent closures along SR 39 through the San Gabriel Valley. During the winter of 1978, following a period of heavy rainfall, a rockslide damaged the northernmost 4.5-mile (7.2 km) stretch of SR 39 near Crystal Lake to the road's terminus at SR 2, at Islip Saddle. This resulted in the permanent closure of a 6.1 mi (9.8 km) portion of SR 39. In 1990, Caltrans started maintaining the damaged sections by restoring culverts and adding berms. The transit agency offered the closed portion of the road to the United States Forest Service, which would only accept it if the road was returned to a wild state, a proposition considered to be more costly than reconstruction. During the 1997–98 El Niño event, heavy rainfall caused another rockslide that damaged sections still under construction. Following a Caltrans study, which determined that the road's reopening would not harm the environment, the closed portion was reopened as a service road and emergency route in February 2003. In June 2006, California authorized funding to conduct a three-year-long environmental impact report. It was predicted that a reopened SR 39 would reduce travel time by around 50% between Mount Waterman and Pasadena, shortening the drive from about two hours to one. According to Caltrans, work could begin in 2009 on reconstruction, as well as the installation of safety features to prevent future slides from damaging the roadway.

The environmental impact statement was completed in 2009, estimating the project's cost at $32 million (over $45 million in 2023, adjusted for inflation). After the report was released, California Fish and Wildlife informed Caltrans that the road's reconstruction would negatively affect the subspecies of bighorn sheep, the Nelson's bighorn sheep, a protected species in the state. In September 2011, Caltrans canceled plans to reopen the closed portion of SR 39. By that time, the maintenance cost for that portion of the road was $1.3 million per year. Thereafter, the agency tried to transfer responsibility for the entirety of SR 39 north of postmile LA 17.81 (including the closed section) to either the U.S. Forest Service or Los Angeles County, both of which declined for financial reasons, even though both the USFS and the county deemed the route "essential". Abandoning the route would not be cost-effective for Caltrans due to, among other reasons, federal environmental restoration requirements related to the presence of bighorn sheep. The proposal was abandoned after opposition by local residents and the county, as well as substantial legal pressure by the Forest Service, who threatened to enforce an old contract that requires Caltrans to completely deconstruct the highway should it refuse to maintain it. After lobbying from the cities of Azusa and Glendora, and support from congresswoman Grace Napolitano, Caltrans restarted plans in 2011 toward reopening the closed section of SR 39. Benefits for the project included another evacuation route for Azusa. On December 15, 2022, Caltrans held a meeting to consider several proposed plans to reopen SR 39. Proposals include a full restoration, minimal restoration for emergency services, a single-lane road, or recreational use. Under the recreational use proposal, the restored route would be closed to general traffic, but would allow for hiking, biking, and other recreational activities.

== Major intersections ==
Except where prefixed with a letter, postmiles were measured on the road as it was in 1964, based on the alignment that existed at the time, and do not necessarily reflect current mileage. Postmile prefixes include: R reflecting a realignment in the route since then, M indicating a second realignment, L referring to an overlap due to a correction or change, and T indicating postmiles classified as temporary. Segments that remain unconstructed or have been relinquished to local control may be omitted. The numbers reset at county lines; the start and end postmiles in each county are given in the county column.

| County | Location | Postmile | Destinations | Notes |
|---|---|---|---|---|
| Orange; ORA 0.00-17.26 | Huntington Beach | 0.00 | SR 1 (Pacific Coast Highway) – Long Beach, Newport Beach | Southern terminus; former US 101 Alt. |
| Orange; ORA 0.00-17.26 | Huntington Beach–Westminster line | 5.80 | I-405 (San Diego Freeway) – Long Beach, Irvine, San Diego | I-405 exit 16; former SR 7 |
| Orange; ORA 0.00-17.26 | Westminster | 8.48 | SR 22 (Garden Grove Freeway) – Long Beach, Santa Ana, Orange | SR 22 exit 8 |
| Orange; ORA 0.00-17.26 | Stanton–Anaheim line | 11.6 | North end of state maintenance | |
| Orange; ORA 0.00-17.26 | Anaheim | 12.71 | Lincoln Avenue | Former SR 214 |
| Orange; ORA 0.00-17.26 | Buena Park | 14.38 | SR 91 (Artesia Freeway) – Riverside, Artesia, Beach Cities | SR 91 exit 23B |
| Orange; ORA 0.00-17.26 | Buena Park | 15.07 | I-5 (Santa Ana Freeway) – Los Angeles, Santa Ana, San Diego | Interchange; south end of state maintenance; I-5 exit 116; access to and from northbound I-5 via Auto Center Drive |
| Orange; ORA 0.00-17.26 | Buena Park | 15.08 | Auto Center Drive | Formerly Manchester Avenue and former SR 10 |
| Orange; ORA 0.00-17.26 | Buena Park | 15.57 | To I-5 north / Artesia Boulevard | Alternate southbound access to I-5 north via Artesia Boulevard west |
| Orange; ORA 0.00-17.26 | Buena Park | 15.63 | Stage Road / Cascade Way | Stage Road was formerly SR 26 |
| Orange; ORA 0.00-17.26 | Buena Park | 16.38 | La Mirada Boulevard (CR N8) / Malvern Avenue | Southern terminus of Los Angeles County Route N8 |
| Los Angeles; LA D17.26-D18.44 | La Mirada | D17.34 | Rosecrans Avenue | |
| Orange; ORA 18.44-22.66 | La Habra | 19.17 | SR 90 east (Imperial Highway) – Brea, Yorba Linda | Western terminus of SR 90; Imperial Highway was former SR 90 west before being relinquished to local jurisdictions |
| Orange; ORA 18.44-22.66 | La Habra | 20.72 | SR 72 north (Whittier Boulevard) – Whittier | Former US 101; Whittier Boulevard was former SR 72 south before being relinquished to local jurisdictions |
| Orange; ORA 18.44-22.66 | La Habra | 22.66 0 (Note: Indicates that the mileage represents the distance along the traversable route under California Streets and Highways Code § 339 (d) that Caltrans has not yet officially adopted.) | Whittier Boulevard east / Harbor Boulevard south | North end of Orange County segment, as adopted and signed by Caltrans; former US 101 south; former SR 72 south |
| Los Angeles; LA 10.70-44.40 | Rowland Heights | 4.0 | Fullerton Road north / Colima Road east | |
| Los Angeles; LA 10.70-44.40 | Hacienda Heights–City of Industry line | 5.5 | Colima Road west ( CR N8) / Azusa Avenue south | South end of CR N8 overlap |
| Los Angeles; LA 10.70-44.40 | City of Industry | 5.9 | SR 60 (Pomona Freeway) – Los Angeles, Pomona | SR 60 exit18 |
| Los Angeles; LA 10.70-44.40 | City of Industry | 6.8 | Chestnut Street | Interchange; northbound exit and entrance only |
| Los Angeles; LA 10.70-44.40 | City of Industry | 6.9 | Valley Boulevard | Interchange; access via connector roads |
| Los Angeles; LA 10.70-44.40 | South San Jose Hills–Valinda– West Covina tripoint | 8.1 | Temple Avenue | North end of state control, as defined by Streets and Highways Code § 339 (d) |
| Los Angeles; LA 10.70-44.40 | West Covina | 11.5 10.71 | CR N8 ends | South end of Los Angeles County segment, as adopted and signed by Caltrans;; north end of CR N8 overlap; I-10 exit 36; former US 99 |
| Los Angeles; LA 10.70-44.40 | West Covina | 11.5 10.71 | I-10 (San Bernardino Freeway) – Los Angeles, San Bernardino | South end of Los Angeles County segment, as adopted and signed by Caltrans;; north end of CR N8 overlap; I-10 exit 36; former US 99 |
| Los Angeles; LA 10.70-44.40 | Azusa | 14.05 | I-210 (Foothill Freeway) – Pasadena, San Bernardino | I-210 exit 40 |
| Los Angeles; LA 10.70-44.40 | Azusa | 17.81 | Bridge over San Gabriel River; South end of state maintenance | |
| Los Angeles; LA 10.70-44.40 | | 39.90 | Northbound road closure gate | |
| Los Angeles; LA 10.70-44.40 | Islip Saddle | 44.40 | SR 2 (Angeles Crest Highway) – La Cañada Flintridge, Wrightwood | Closed; northern terminus |
1.000 mi = 1.609 km; 1.000 km = 0.621 mi: Closed/former; Incomplete access
