= California State Route 42 =

Former highway in California

State Route 42
- SR 42's last routing highlighted in red.

Route information
- Maintained by Caltrans
- Existed: 1960–2000

Major junctions
- West end: SR 1 in Westchester
- I-405 in Inglewood; I-110 in Los Angeles; I-710 in South Gate; I-605 In Norwalk
- East end: I-5 (Note: The direct interchange with I-5 has since been demolished in 2013, 13 years after SR 42 was officially decommissioned.) in Norwalk

Location
- Country: United States
- State: California
- Counties: Los Angeles

Highway system
- State highways in California; Interstate; US; State; Scenic; History; Pre‑1964; Unconstructed; Deleted; Freeways
← SR 41	→ SR 43

State Route 42 (SR 42) is a decommissioned state highway in the southern region part of the U.S. state of California, running along Manchester Avenue, Manchester Boulevard and Firestone Boulevard in Los Angeles and the cities south of it. In its final official routing that lasted from 1968 to 2000, SR 42 ran from State Route 1 west of Inglewood (near Los Angeles International Airport) east to what was then a direct interchange with Interstate 5 in Norwalk. Though signed as SR 42, it was officially Route 105 until it was replaced by the parallel Interstate 105 on October 14, 1993. The entire route was deleted from the California Freeway and Expressway System in 2000, with the remaining portion of SR 42 being relinquished to local jurisdictions in that year. The direct interchange with I-5 was later demolished in 2013 in favor of widening that portion of the Interstate. However, some SR 42 signs may still remain along the route.

== Route description ==
State Route 42 began at Lincoln Boulevard (State Route 1) as Manchester Avenue. East of Sepulveda Boulevard, Manchester Avenue crossed into Inglewood, where it is known as Manchester Boulevard. It jogged about two blocks to the north just west of Interstate 405, and back to the south after passing downtown Inglewood. Upon crossing back into Los Angeles, it again became Manchester Avenue.

At Central Avenue, SR 42 entered the unincorporated community of Florence-Graham. It then became Firestone Boulevard and passed through South Gate and Downey, and ended in Norwalk at a merge with Interstate 5 (the Santa Ana Freeway).

Two Metro stations serves the corridor:

- Firestone
- Manchester

== History ==
Legislative Route 174 was defined in 1933 to run from pre-1964 Legislative Route 60 west of Inglewood east to pre-1964 Legislative Route 2 near Santa Ana. It was signed as State Route 10 in the initial signage of routes in 1934, running from State Route 3 (now State Route 1) to U.S. Route 101 near the present junction of Interstate 5 and Anaheim Boulevard. (US 101 and LR 2 left the current I-5 alignment north onto Anaheim Boulevard, eventually entering downtown Los Angeles via present State Route 72.)

The present alignment of I-5 between Chapman Avenue in Anaheim and Main Street in Santa Ana was also part of LR 174, after a short concurrency of LR 2 and LR 174 in Anaheim. LR 2 used those two streets through Orange, but US 101 was moved to LR 174 once it was built, and so that part of LR 174 was never signed as SR 10. The bypassed section of LR 2 became State Route 51 in the 1964 renumbering, but was removed from the state highway system in 1965.

By 1942, the piece of SR 10 east of State Route 19 (Lakewood Boulevard) had been designated U.S. Route 101 Bypass. U.S. Route 101 moved to the present Interstate 5 alignment, formerly US 101 Bypass, by 1959, and SR 10 was truncated to the present I-5/Firestone Boulevard junction.

State Route 10
- Location: Inglewood - Norwalk
- Existed: 1934–1960

Around 1960, SR 10 was renumbered to State Route 42 due to the nearby Interstate 10 (numbered in 1957). This change, which would have normally happened in the 1964 renumbering, was done early due to the closeness of I-10. Route 42 was legislatively defined in that renumbering, running not only from SR 1 to I-5, but beyond to State Route 91 in Anaheim Hills. This route split from the existing SR 42 in Norwalk and ran east along unbuilt pre-1964 Legislative Route 176 to the intersection of State Route 39 (Beach Boulevard) and Imperial Highway. East of SR 39, Imperial Highway was state-maintained, and carried pre-1964 LR 176 and post-1964 SR 42 to its end at SR 91. The whole route, from SR 1 to SR 91, had been added to the California Freeway and Expressway System in 1959.

State Route 105
- Location: Inglewood - Norwalk
- Existed: 1968–1993

In 1965, the unbuilt part from Interstate 605 east to SR 39 was transferred to State Route 90, which had been defined in 1964 to end at I-605; this left a gap in SR 42. The part of SR 42 west of I-605 was added to the Interstate Highway System as Interstate 105 in March 1968, and the legislative changes were made that year - that piece became Route 105, and the piece east of SR 39 became a further extension of SR 90.

Despite being officially Route 105 since 1968, the route continued to be signed as SR 42, not only along its defined alignment from SR 1 to I-605, but past I-605 to Interstate 5 (which had loosely become part of SR 90 in 1965).

Interstate 105 was constructed from 1982 to 1994. Even after the new route was finished, and the last section of the old route was relinquished in mid-2000, some SR 42 signs still stand such as the one on southbound La Cienega Boulevard approaching I-405 and Manchester Boulevard, and signs on I-710 approaching Firestone Boulevard. Since the widening of Interstate 5 between Interstate 605 and the Los Angeles-Orange County line, Firestone Boulevard does not connect with it anymore, instead ending at Bloomfield Avenue. Access to Firestone Boulevard from I-5 is now via Rosecrans Avenue.

== Major intersections ==
Except where prefixed with a letter, postmiles were measured on the road as it was in 1964, based on the alignment that existed at the time, and do not necessarily reflect current mileage. Postmile prefixes include: R reflecting a realignment in the route since then, M indicating a second realignment, L referring to an overlap due to a correction or change, and T indicating postmiles classified as temporary. Segments that remain unconstructed or have been relinquished to local control may be omitted. The entire route was in Los Angeles County.

Location	Postmile	Destinations	Notes
Los Angeles	0.00	West Manchester Avenue	Continuation beyond SR 1
Los Angeles	0.00	SR 1 (Lincoln Boulevard)	West end of SR 42
Los Angeles	1.32	Sepulveda Boulevard	
Inglewood	2.91	I-405 (San Diego Freeway)	Interchange
Inglewood	3.83	La Brea Avenue	Former SR 107
Inglewood	5.42	Crenshaw Boulevard	
Los Angeles	6.42	Western Avenue	Former SR 213
Los Angeles	7.42	Vermont Avenue	
Los Angeles	7.93	Figueroa Street	
Los Angeles	8.04	I-110 (Harbor Freeway) – Los Angeles, San Pedro	Interchange
Los Angeles	8.19	Broadway	
Los Angeles	8.39	Main Street	
Los Angeles	9.44	Central Avenue	East end of Manchester Avenue; west end of Firestone Boulevard
Florence-Graham	10.97	Alameda Street	Former SR 47
South Gate	11.61	Long Beach Boulevard	
South Gate	14.53	I-710 (Long Beach Freeway) – Pasadena, Long Beach	Interchange
South Gate	14.81	Garfield Avenue	
Downey	17.45	SR 19 (Lakewood Boulevard) – Long Beach, Pasadena	
Norwalk	18.82	I-605 (San Gabriel River Freeway)	Interchange
Norwalk		Imperial Highway	Former SR 90
Norwalk		I-5 south (Santa Ana Freeway) – Santa Ana	Interchange; eastbound exit and westbound entrance; east end of SR 42. The entrance and exit were permanently closed in 2013 with the widening of I-5, and thus motorists have since been redirected south on Bloomfield Avenue and east on Rosecrans Avenue.
1.000 mi = 1.609 km; 1.000 km = 0.621 mi
