= California State Route 6 =

Two highways in the U.S. state of California have been signed as Route 6:

- U.S. Route 6 in California, part of the U.S. Numbered Highway System but simply referred to as "Route 6" in state law
- California State Route 6 (1934), now part of I-10
