= California State Route 91 =

Highway in California

State Route 91
- SR 91 highlighted in red, with relinquished portions in pink

Route information
- Maintained by Caltrans
- Length: 59.047 mi (95.027 km) Portions of SR 91 have been relinquished to or are otherwise maintained by local or other governments, and are not included in the length.
- History: 1930s as a highway; 1964 as number
- Tourist routes: Riverside Freeway

Major junctions
- West end: Vermont Avenue in Gardena
- I-110 in Los Angeles; I-710 in Long Beach; I-605 in Cerritos; I-5 at the Buena Park–Fullerton border; SR 57 in Anaheim; SR 55 in Anaheim; SR 241 Toll in Yorba Linda; I-15 in Corona
- East end: I-215 / SR 60 in Riverside

Location
- Country: United States
- State: California
- Counties: Los Angeles, Orange, Riverside

Highway system
- State highways in California; Interstate; US; State; Scenic; History; Pre‑1964; Unconstructed; Deleted; Freeways
← SR 90	→ SR 92

State Route 91 (SR 91) is a major east–west state highway in the U.S. state of California that serves several regions of the Greater Los Angeles urban area. A freeway throughout its entire length, it officially runs from Vermont Avenue in Gardena, just west of the junction with the Harbor Freeway (Interstate 110, I-110), east to Riverside at the junction with the Pomona (SR 60 west of SR 91) and Moreno Valley (SR 60 and I-215 east of SR 91) freeways. SR 91 is also known colloquially as "the 91" to Southern California residents.

Though signs along Artesia Boulevard from Vermont Avenue west to Pacific Coast Highway (SR 1) in Hermosa Beach continue to mark it as part of SR 91, control of this segment of the highway was relinquished to local jurisdictions in 2003 and are thus no longer officially part of the state highway system.

SR 91 inherited its route number from the mostly decommissioned U.S. Route 91 (US 91), which passed through the Inland Empire in a northeasterly direction on its way to Las Vegas, Salt Lake City, and points beyond. Those segments of US 91 are now parallel to, or have been replaced altogether by, I-15.

== Route description ==
Route 91 is defined in section 391, subdivision (a), of the California Streets and Highways Code, and that the highway is "Vermont Avenue at the eastern city limits of Gardena to Route 215 in Riverside via Santa Ana Canyon". Control of the former western segment of Route 91 to Hermosa Beach was relinquished by the state to local jurisdictions, and subdivision (b) mandates that it is no longer eligible to be re-adopted as a state highway.

From the Harbor Freeway (I-110) to its interchange with the Long Beach Freeway (I-710) in northern Long Beach, SR 91 is named the Gardena Freeway. Between the Long Beach Freeway and its interchange with the Santa Ana Freeway (I-5) in Buena Park, it is named the Artesia Freeway. From the Santa Ana Freeway to its eastern terminus at the interchange of the Pomona, Moreno Valley, and Escondido Freeways, it is named the Riverside Freeway. In addition, southern Californians usually refer to the entire route as "the 91".

Control cities on the route vary by location. When traveling westbound between SR 60/I-215 and the Orange County line, the listed control city is "Beach Cities". With SR 241 heading towards Irvine, Laguna Beach, and the rest of south Orange County, the control city becomes Los Angeles between the Orange–Riverside county line and I-5. I-5 directs travelers to Los Angeles, so between I-5 and Pioneer Boulevard, the control city is Artesia. Between Pioneer Boulevard and SR 1, the control city becomes Beach Cities again; besides Carmenita Road in Cerritos, the control city is in Long Beach. Heading eastbound, the control city for the entire route is Riverside. The Beach Cities control city may have to do with SR 91's former western terminus in Hermosa Beach.

SR 91 is part of the California Freeway and Expressway System and is part of the National Highway System, a network of highways that are considered essential to the country's economy, defense, and mobility by the Federal Highway Administration. SR 91 is part of the State Scenic Highway System from SR 55 to the east city limit of Anaheim, in the western part of the Santa Ana Canyon, and is eligible for the system through the canyon to Interstate 15.

=== Gardena Freeway ===
The Gardena Freeway is a freeway in southern Los Angeles County. It is the westernmost freeway portion of State Route 91. It begins just west of the Harbor Freeway, at the intersection with Vermont Avenue in the eastern edge of the city of Gardena, proceeding eastward approximately six miles (9.7 km) until it intersects the Long Beach Freeway. Thereafter, SR 91 is known as the Artesia Freeway.

Until 1991, the Gardena Freeway was known as the Redondo Beach Freeway. The name change reflected the successful efforts of the cities of Torrance and Redondo Beach to block the extension of the freeway westward to its intended terminus at the cancelled Pacific Coast Freeway in Redondo Beach. In 1997, the California government dedicated the portion of SR 91 between Alameda Street and Central Avenue to former assemblyman Willard H. Murray Jr.

=== Artesia Freeway ===
The Artesia Freeway is a freeway in southeastern Los Angeles County and northwestern Orange County. It runs east–west from its western terminus at the Long Beach Freeway in northern Long Beach to its eastern terminus at the Santa Ana Freeway in Buena Park. (SR 91 continues west of the Long Beach Freeway as the Gardena Freeway, and east of the Santa Ana Freeway as the Riverside Freeway.) The "Artesia Freeway" name originally was assigned to the entire length of SR 91 west of the Santa Ana Freeway in the early 1970s since it was, in a sense, the freeway realignment of SR 91 from the paralleling Artesia Boulevard.

During the 1984 Summer Olympics, a 25 km (16 mi) stretch of the highway was home to the cycling men's road team time trial event.

As the only freeway to link Los Angeles, Orange, and Riverside counties, SR 91 is one of the most heavily congested routes in Southern California.

=== Riverside Freeway ===
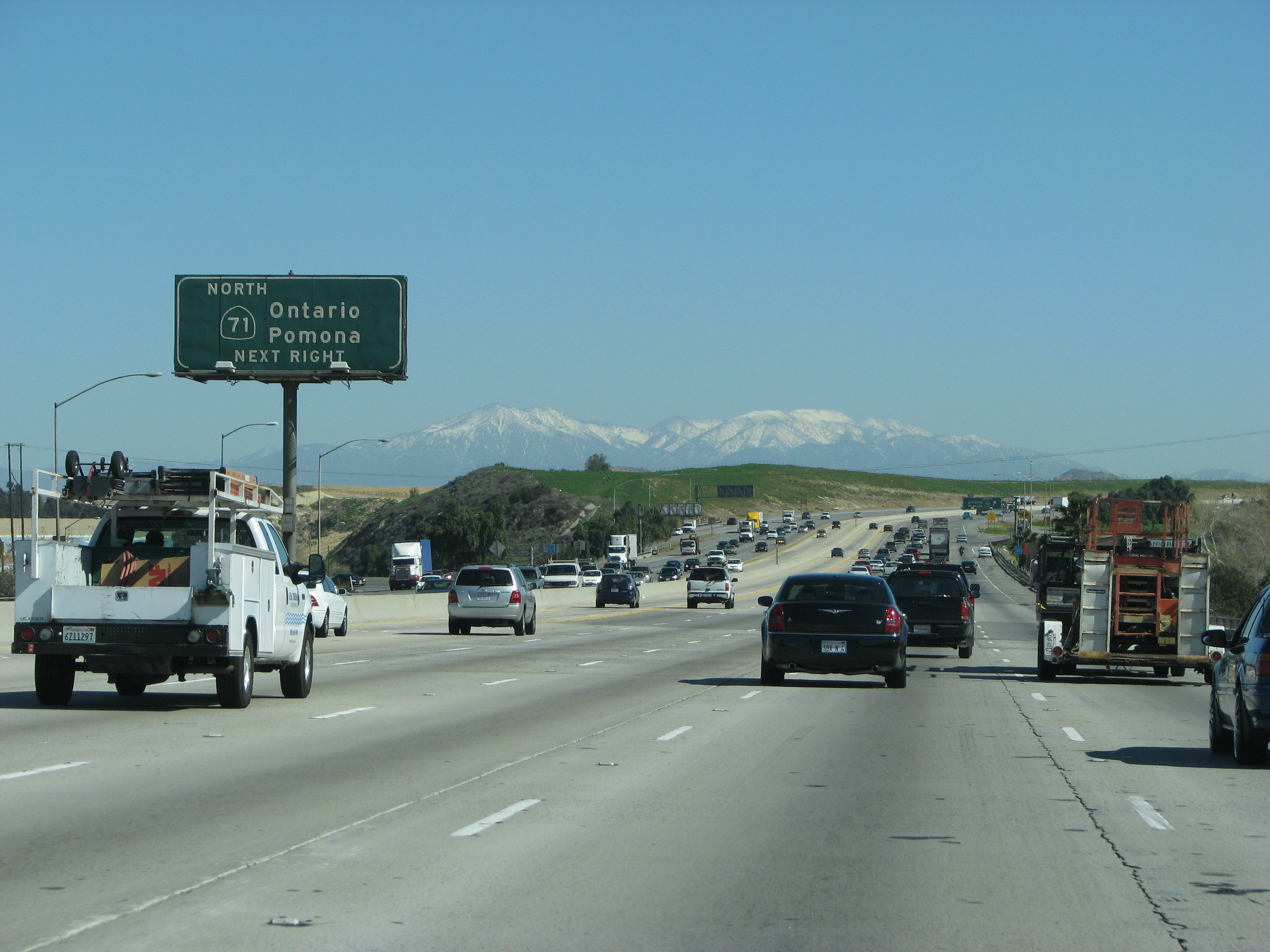
Eastbound SR 91 just before SR 71 in February 2008, before the toll lane extension

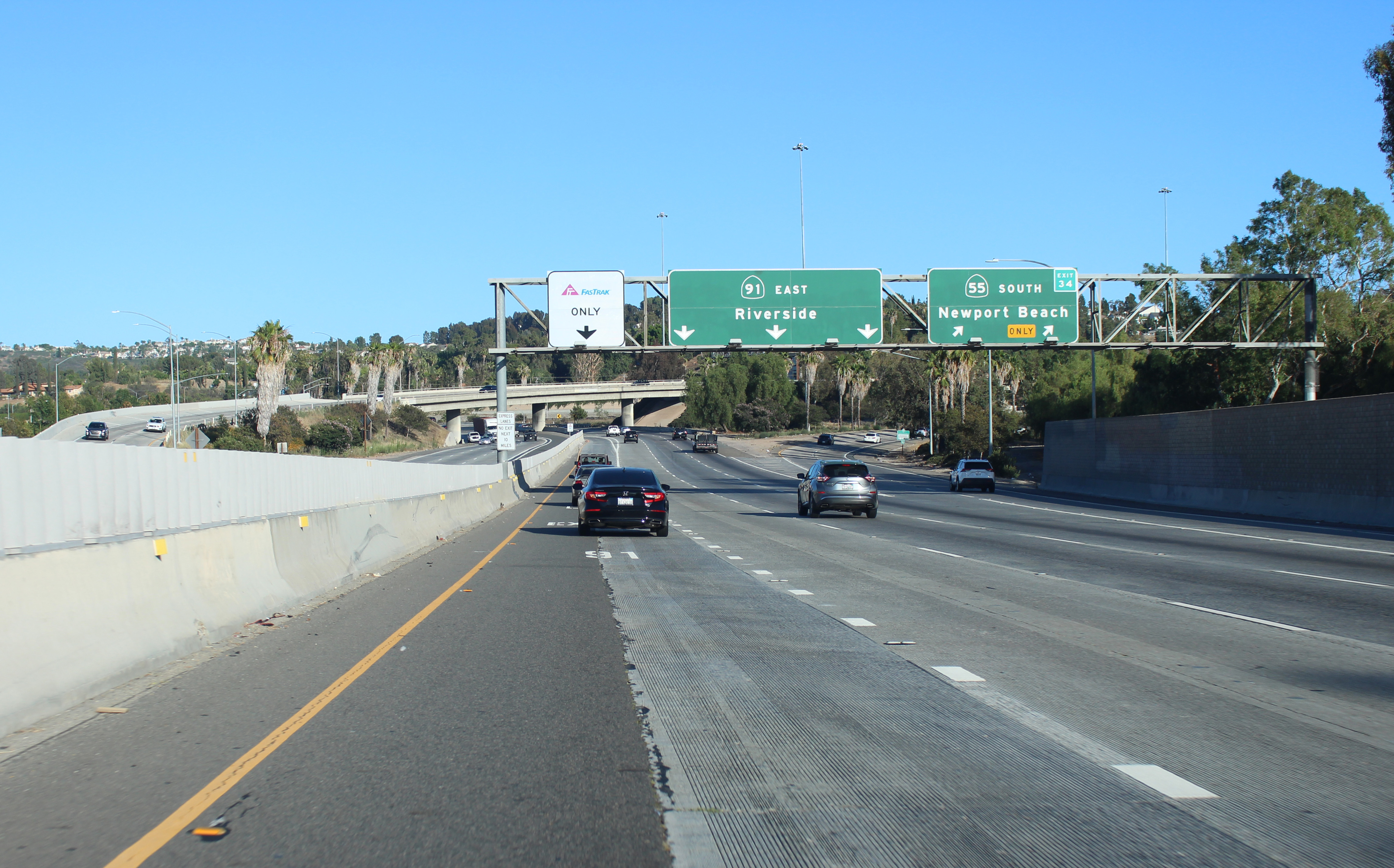
Eastbound SR 91 at SR 55 (right) and 91 Express Lanes (left) in June 2022

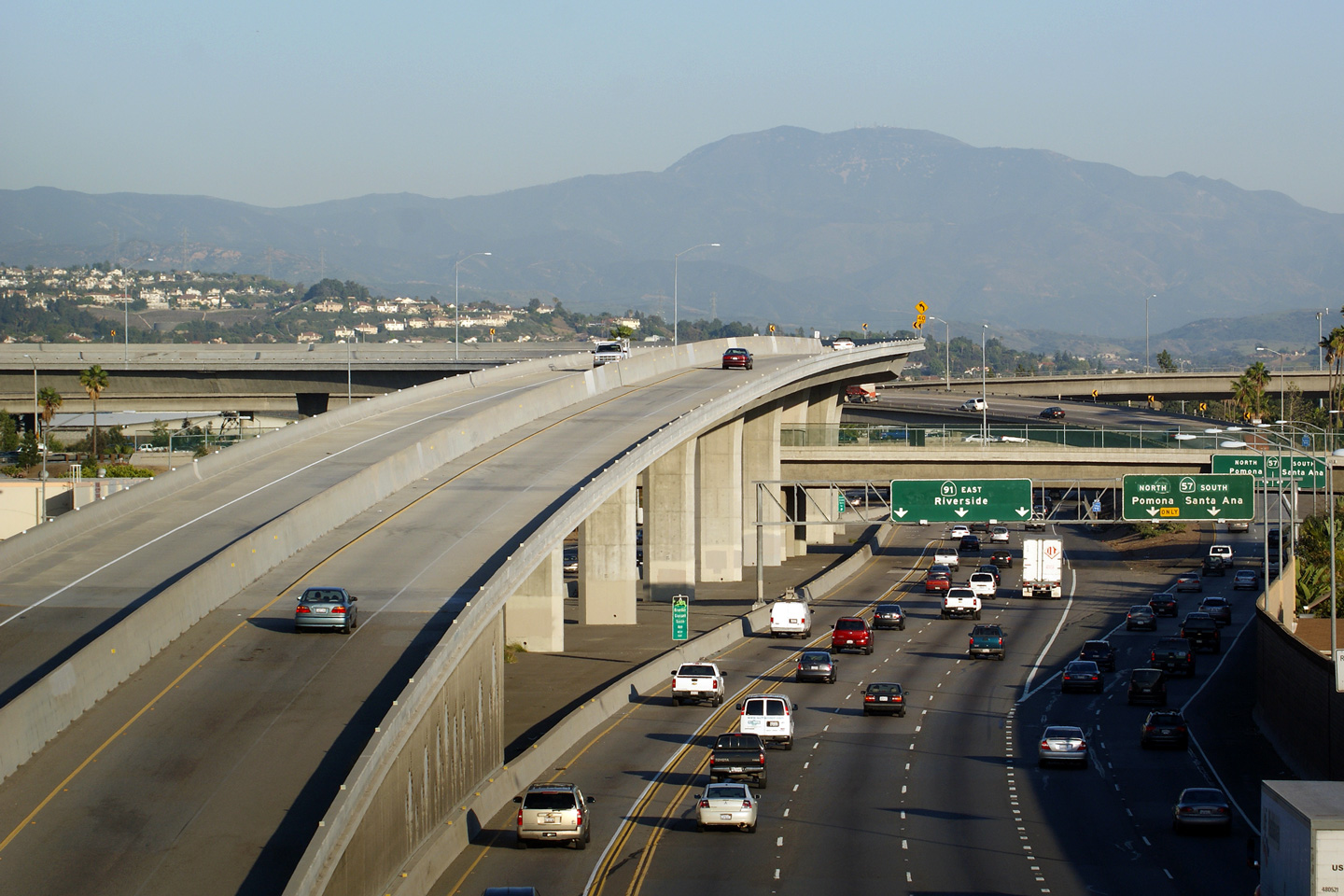
Easterly view approaching SR 57 in October 2011

Between the Santa Ana Freeway, Interstate 5 (I-5), in Buena Park and the 91 Freeway's eastern terminus at a junction with Interstate 215 and State Route 60 in Riverside, the 91 Freeway's assigned name is the Riverside Freeway. Past the I-215/SR 60/SR 91 junction, the Riverside Freeway continues as I-215.

The freeway through the Santa Ana Canyon is paralleled by the 91/Perris Valley Line of Metrolink. Named after SR 91, the line also connects Los Angeles to Orange and Riverside counties.

A weigh station for both directions is located between the Imperial Highway and Yorba Linda Boulevard/Weir Canyon Road exits.

In 2003, Caltrans permanently closed off the Coal Canyon Road westbound and eastbound exits and entrances for environmental purposes; however, there are still traces of unmaintained road where the former exit lay, showing evidence that the ramps still exist, available to use as runaway ramps or for emergency stops.

In 2015, Caltrans permanently closed off the Grand Boulevard eastbound exit and westbound entrance to accommodate the widening of the freeway. If the ramps had stayed open, more businesses and houses would have been demolished. The ramps were scrapped with the widening and there is no emergency exit.

The Riverside Freeway first opened in 1963 signed as U.S. Route 91 and U.S. Route 395, and the last section was built in 1975.

=== 91 Express Lanes ===
The 91 Express Lanes are 18-mile (29 km) high-occupancy toll lanes (HOT lanes) contained entirely within the median of the Riverside Freeway in Orange and Riverside counties. The 91 Express Lanes run from the junction of SR 91 with the SR 55 Freeway (Costa Mesa Freeway) in Anaheim to its junction with I-15 in Corona. Before the extension in 2017, they ended at the Riverside County line. With the extension of the toll lanes, the HOV lane between I-15 and Green River Road was converted into a HOT lane. The primary purpose of the toll lanes is to provide a faster output for drivers due to the congestion the highway experiences during peak hours, and to promote carpooling. The toll lanes opened in 1995 and when they opened, it was the country's first fully-automated toll collection system to feature value pricing.

The 91 Express Lanes consist of two primary lanes in each direction, separated from the main lanes of the Riverside Freeway with white, 3-foot-high (0.91 m), plastic lane markers (as opposed to concrete barriers or a similar solid barrier, or even just double white lines separating many other California HOT lanes). Entry and exit points for the 91 Express Lanes are only located at their west and east ends, and at the Orange–Riverside county line where the toll road originally terminated before 2017.

As of July 2026, the toll rates differ between the counties. In the Riverside County segment, drivers are tolled using a congestion pricing system based on the real-time levels of traffic. The Orange County segment instead uses a preset variable pricing system based on the time of day, with the highest toll rate set at $9.65 being charged at 2:00 pm to 3:00 pm eastbound on Fridays. Carpools with three or more people and motorcycles are charged 50 percent of the posted toll when traveling eastbound from 4:00 pm to 6:00 pm on weekdays, and travel toll-free at all other times, if they use the designated carpool lane at the toll collection points. All tolls are collected using an open road tolling system, and therefore there are no toll booths to receive cash. Each vehicle is required to carry a FasTrak transponder. The 91 Express Lanes' system predates the introduction of the FasTrak Flex version, with a switch set to indicate the number of the vehicle's occupants, so that either the standard FasTrak tag without the switch may be used. However, carpools with three or more people and motorcycles must still apply for a "special Access account" to receive the carpool discounts. Drivers without any FasTrak tag will be assessed a toll violation regardless of whether they qualify for the carpool discounts.

== History ==
=== Original US 91: Barstow to Nevada ===
U.S. Route 91
- Location: Long Beach–Primm, NV
- Existed: 1926–1974

The Arrowhead Trail, an auto trail connecting Salt Lake City with Los Angeles, initially took a longer route via present US 95 and former US 66 between Las Vegas and Needles, as the more direct Old Spanish Trail was in very poor condition. The "Silver Lake cutoff", which would save about 90 miles (140 km), was proposed by 1920, and completed in 1925 as an oiled road by San Bernardino County. The Bureau of Public Roads and the state of Nevada both urged its inclusion in the state highway system, the former as part of the federal aid highway connecting Salt Lake City and Los Angeles, and the state legislature did that in 1925, with it becoming an extension of Route 31. (Across the state line, State Route 6 continued through Las Vegas to Arizona.) The initial plan for the U.S. Highway system simply stated that Route No. 91 would run from Las Vegas "to an intersection with Route No. 60" (which became US 66 in 1926), but in 1926 the cutoff was chosen, ending at US 66 at Daggett, just east of Barstow. (The roadway south from Las Vegas later became part of US 95.) The route was added to the federal-aid secondary system in 1926, which helped pay for a mid-1930s widening and paving, including some realignments (parts of the old road are now known as Arrowhead Trail). The new routing generally followed the present I-15, except through Baker (where it used Baker Boulevard) and into Barstow (where it followed former SR 58 to First Avenue, ending at Main Street, which carried US 66).

=== SR 18: former extension of US 91 through Santa Ana Canyon to Long Beach ===
US 91 was extended southwest to Long Beach in the late 1940s. Beginning at Barstow, the extension overlapped US 66 over Cajon Pass to San Bernardino. From San Bernardino west through Riverside and Santa Ana Canyon to Olive, the state took over a mostly paved county highway in 1931 as part of an extension of Route 43 to Newport Beach via Santa Ana. Two branches leading west from Route 43 near Olive along mostly constructed county roads were added in 1933: Route 175 along Orangethorpe Avenue and Artesia Boulevard from near the mouth of the canyon west to Route 60 (now SR 1) in Hermosa Beach (unconstructed through Compton until the mid-1950s), and Route 178 along Lincoln Avenue and Carson Street from Olive west to Route 168 (now SR 19) in Lakewood. When state routes were marked in 1934, Route 175 became Sign Route 14, and Sign Route 18 included all of Route 178 and most of Route 43 into the San Bernardino Mountains. When US 91 was extended to Long Beach, it overlapped SR 18 from San Bernardino to Lakewood, where it turned south along SR 19 to the Los Alamitos Traffic Circle. There, it turned west along US 101 Alternate to near downtown Long Beach, where it ended at SR 15 (Atlantic Avenue), at a terminus shared with US 6. (This routing along SR 19 and US 101 Alt. also became an extension of SR 18.)

In 1935, the state improved the alignment between Fairmont Boulevard and Gypsum Canyon Road, including a bypass of the old road, which curved along the south slope of the canyon, east of Weir Canyon Road. In the late 1930s, the Prado Dam project resulted in the bypassing of a longer section, replacing Prado Road, an abandoned road curving to the east end of the dam, Pomona Rincon Road, Auto Center Drive, Pomona Road, and Yorba Street with the present Green River Road, Palisades Drive, part of SR 91, and 6th Street.

=== SR 14: present SR 91 to Hermosa Beach ===
Before the present freeway was constructed, SR 14 ran along Gould Avenue, Redondo Beach Boulevard, Compton Boulevard, Alameda Street, Artesia Avenue, La Habra Boulevard, Firestone Boulevard and Orangethorpe Avenue. In the 1964 renumbering, SR 14 was renumbered to SR 91.

Before 1991, the Gardena Freeway was known as the Redondo Beach Freeway, referring to Caltrans's original intention for the freeway portion of the route to continue to the never-built Pacific Coast Freeway.

Before 1997, Caltrans controlled maintenance of SR 91 up to State Route 1 in Hermosa Beach. The portion between Vermont Avenue and Western Avenue was relinquished to Gardena in 1997. In 2003, the western portion, from SR 1 to Western Avenue, was relinquished to the cities through that the road goes through.

The first segment of the freeway was built in 1965 as US 91, and the last segment was built in 1975. Despite the relinquishments, however, Artesia Boulevard between I-110 and SR 1 is still signed off as SR 91.

=== Construction of the 91 Express Lanes ===
Due to rapid population growth and the decline in the availability of affordable housing closer to job centers in Orange County, new residential development began in earnest in western Riverside County from the 1980s through today. This development is occurring in or around existing cities such as Riverside, Corona, Moreno Valley, Lake Elsinore, Murrieta, and Temecula. This development also led to the incorporation of the cities of Wildomar, Menifee, Eastvale, and Jurupa Valley.

As there are very few direct routes between Orange and Riverside counties because of the Santa Ana Mountains that separate them, the Riverside Freeway is subject to high traffic volumes, composed primarily of commuters traveling between their jobs in Orange County and their homes in Riverside County (often referred to by traffic reporters as "The Corona Crawl"). Typical peak period delays were 30–40 minutes in each direction in the ten miles (16 km) of the tollway before construction.

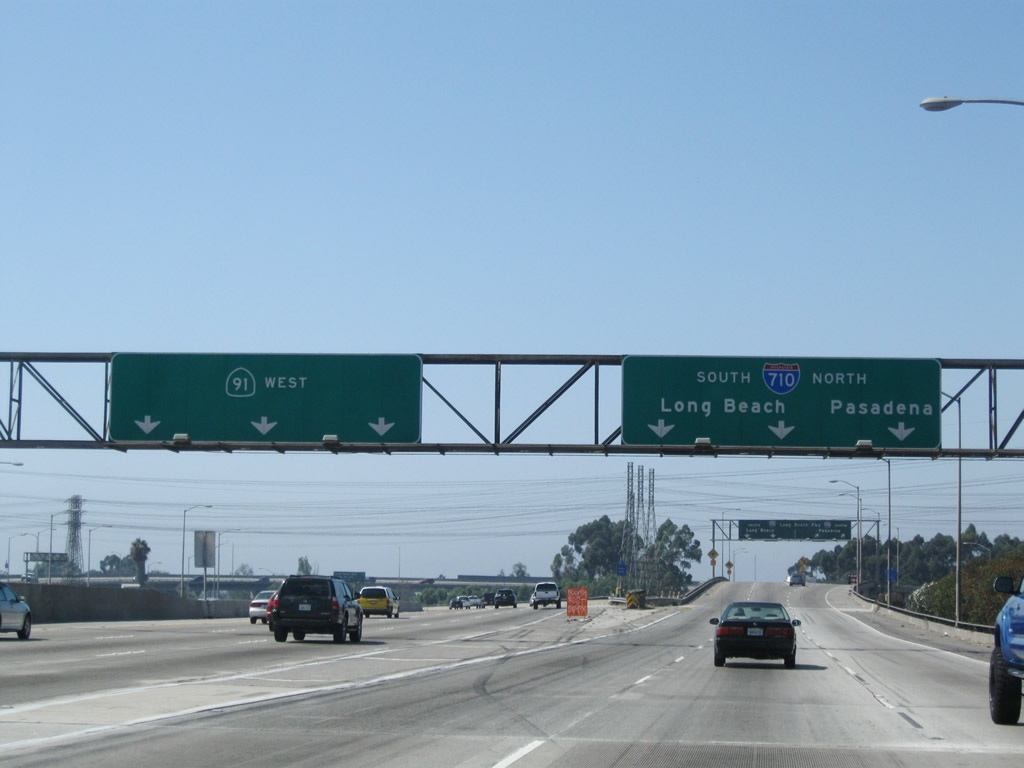
Westbound Artesia Freeway (SR 91) at the interchange with the Long Beach Freeway (I-710) in August 2013

Solutions to the traffic problem were limited. The chosen solution was to create a toll road in the median of the freeway. This original section of the 91 Express Lanes operated between the Costa Mesa Freeway (SR 55) interchange in eastern Anaheim and the Orange–Riverside county line, a distance of about 10 miles (16 km). The project was developed in partnership with the California Department of Transportation (Caltrans) by California Private Transportation Company (CPTC), which formally transferred ownership of the facility to the State of California prior to opening the project to traffic on December 27, 1995. Caltrans then leased the toll road back to CPTC for a 35-year operating period. The new lanes have been officially designated a part of the state highway system. The California Highway Patrol (CHP) is responsible for providing police services at CPTC's expense. Maintenance and operational costs for the facility are also the responsibility of CPTC.

In April 2002, the Orange County Transportation Authority (OCTA) reached an agreement in concept to purchase the private toll road project for $207.5 million. The OCTA took possession of the toll road on January 3, 2003, marking the first time the 91 Express Lanes were managed by public officials. Within a few months, OCTA turned the lanes into the HOT / tollway hybrid that it is today. One of the primary investors in CPTC, Cofiroute USA, continues to manage and operate the lanes under a management contract with OCTA.

Opening in 1995, the 91 Express Lanes was the first privately funded tollway built in the United States since the 1940s, and the first fully automated tollway in the world.

The express lanes have been controversial because of a non-compete agreement that the state made with CPTC. The clause, which was negotiated by Caltrans and never brought to the legislature, prevented any improvements along 30 miles (48 km) of the Riverside Freeway to ensure profit for the express lanes. This includes restricting the state from widening the free lanes or building mass transit near the freeway. CPTC filed a lawsuit against Caltrans over freeway widening related to the interchange with the Eastern Transportation Corridor, which was dismissed once the purchase with OCTA was finalized. Following the settlement, an additional lane was added for a 5-mile (8.0 km) segment eastbound from SR 241 to SR 71.

However, as a result of the controversy, more toll road advocates favor creating local agencies similar to transportation corridor agencies to build and maintain future tollways. New toll roads would be financed with tax-exempt bonds on a stand-alone basis, meaning that taxpayers would not be responsible for repaying any debt if toll revenues fall short. Also, there would be a less restrictive non-compete clause: they would be compensated only for any revenue loss caused by improvements near the toll roads.

In the mid-2010s, the Riverside County Transportation Commission extended the 91 Express Lanes east from their previous terminus at the Orange–Riverside county line to the I-15 interchange in Corona; this extension opened to traffic on March 20, 2017. Both Orange and Riverside County transportation agencies co-manage the 91 Express Lanes.

== Future ==
In 2005, evaluations were made about the feasibility of constructing two tunnels through the Santa Ana Mountains, which could carry 72,000 cars per day and allow for a commuter rail service between Corona and Irvine. The financial and technical evaluations found that in the current financial environment, building the tunnels would not be financially or technologically feasible. Additional study of the Irvine Corona Expressway tunnel project has been deferred until such time as financial considerations improve and/or technological advancements warrant reexamination. If built, the Irvine-Corona Expressway would follow a similar route to the 91 Freeway and is designed to reduce the growing traffic congestion on SR 91 that prompted the construction of the 91 Express Lanes. If completed, the Irvine-Corona Expressway is projected to be the longest traffic tunnel in North America, approximately 11.5 miles (18.5 km). One tunnel would be a reversible two-lane freeway for autos and trucks, the direction reversed based on time of day. It would carry westbound traffic in the morning hours, and eastbound traffic during the afternoon and early evening hours. The second tunnel would be slated exclusively for light rail commuter train service. The proposed tunnels are opposed by environmental groups, cities in Orange County near the terminus of the proposed road, and by the Irvine Company, which believes that the tunnel is not necessary and distracts from short-term solutions such as freeway widening.

Numerous other projects by the Orange County Transportation Authority are currently underway or in the planning phases for distant completion, some as far out as the year 2030.

== Exit list ==
Except where prefixed with a letter, postmiles were measured on the road as it was in 1964, based on the alignment that existed at the time, and do not necessarily reflect current mileage. Postmile prefixes include: R reflecting a realignment in the route since then, M indicating a second realignment, L referring to an overlap due to a correction or change, and T indicating postmiles classified as temporary. Segments that remain unconstructed or have been relinquished to local control may be omitted. The numbers reset at county lines; the start and end postmiles in each county are given in the county column.

County	Location	Postmile	Exit	Destinations	Notes
Los Angeles; LA 0.00-R20.74	Hermosa Beach–Manhattan Beach line	0.00 (Note: Postmiles are measured from SR 91's original western end at SR 1, before that segment east to Vermont Avenue was deleted and relinquished to local control.)		Gould Avenue	Continuation beyond SR 1
Los Angeles; LA 0.00-R20.74	Hermosa Beach–Manhattan Beach line	0.00		SR 1 (Pacific Coast Highway, Sepulveda Boulevard)	Original western terminus of SR 91
Los Angeles; LA 0.00-R20.74	Lawndale–Redondo Beach line			Redondo Beach Boulevard to I-405 north / Hawthorne Boulevard north	
Los Angeles; LA 0.00-R20.74	Redondo Beach–Torrance line	2.47		SR 107 (Hawthorne Boulevard)	No left turn eastbound
Los Angeles; LA 0.00-R20.74	Torrance	3.07		I-405 (San Diego Freeway) – Long Beach, Santa Monica	Interchange; former SR 7 south; I-405 north exit 40, south exit 40A
Los Angeles; LA 0.00-R20.74	Gardena–Los Angeles line	6.01		Vermont Avenue	West end of state maintenance; west end of Gardena Freeway
Los Angeles; LA 0.00-R20.74	Los Angeles	R6.34	6	I-110 south (Harbor Freeway) to I-405 – San Pedro	No exit number eastbound; I-110 north exits 10A-B, south exit 10
Los Angeles; LA 0.00-R20.74	Los Angeles	R6.34	6	I-110 north (Harbor Freeway) – Los Angeles	No exit number eastbound; I-110 north exits 10A-B, south exit 10
Los Angeles; LA 0.00-R20.74	Carson	R6.90	7A	Main Street	No westbound entrance
Los Angeles; LA 0.00-R20.74	Carson	R7.43	7B	Avalon Boulevard	
Los Angeles; LA 0.00-R20.74	Carson–Compton line	R8.44	8	Central Avenue	
Los Angeles; LA 0.00-R20.74	Compton	R9.16	9	Wilmington Avenue	
Los Angeles; LA 0.00-R20.74	Compton	R9.80	10A	Acacia Avenue	Eastbound exit and westbound entrance
Los Angeles; LA 0.00-R20.74	Compton	R10.27– R10.41	10	Santa Fe Avenue, Alameda Street (SR 47 south)	Signed as exits 10B (Alameda Street) and 10C (Santa Fe Avenue) eastbound; no westbound entrance
Los Angeles; LA 0.00-R20.74	Long Beach	R11.10	11	Long Beach Boulevard	
Los Angeles; LA 0.00-R20.74	Long Beach	R11.68	12A	I-710 south (Long Beach Freeway) – Long Beach	Signed as exit 12A westbound; I-710 exits 8A-B; east end of Gardena Freeway; west end of Artesia Freeway
Los Angeles; LA 0.00-R20.74	Long Beach	R11.68	12B	I-710 north (Long Beach Freeway) – Pasadena	Signed as exit 12A westbound; I-710 exits 8A-B; east end of Gardena Freeway; west end of Artesia Freeway
Los Angeles; LA 0.00-R20.74	Long Beach	R12.09	12C	Atlantic Avenue	Signed as exit 12B westbound; former SR 15
Los Angeles; LA 0.00-R20.74	Long Beach	R13.09	13	Cherry Avenue	
Los Angeles; LA 0.00-R20.74	Long Beach	R13.59	14A	Paramount Boulevard	
Los Angeles; LA 0.00-R20.74	Long Beach–Bellflower line	R14.10	14B	Downey Avenue	
Los Angeles; LA 0.00-R20.74	Bellflower	R14.62	15A	SR 19 (Lakewood Boulevard)	Signed as exit 15 eastbound
Los Angeles; LA 0.00-R20.74	Bellflower	R15.11	15B	Clark Avenue	Westbound exit and eastbound entrance
Los Angeles; LA 0.00-R20.74	Bellflower	R15.61	16	Bellflower Boulevard	Former Legislative Route 169
Los Angeles; LA 0.00-R20.74	Cerritos	R16.94	17	I-605 (San Gabriel River Freeway)	Signed as exit 17B westbound; I-605 exit 7A
Los Angeles; LA 0.00-R20.74	Cerritos	R17.09	17A	Studebaker Road	Westbound exit and eastbound entrance
Los Angeles; LA 0.00-R20.74	Artesia	R18.09	18	Pioneer Boulevard	Former SR 35
Los Angeles; LA 0.00-R20.74	Cerritos	R18.65	19A	Norwalk Boulevard	
Los Angeles; LA 0.00-R20.74	Cerritos	R19.17– R19.43	19B	Bloomfield Avenue, Artesia Boulevard	No eastbound entrance; Artesia Boulevard not signed eastbound
Los Angeles; LA 0.00-R20.74	Cerritos	R19.81	19C	Shoemaker Avenue	Eastbound exit and eastbound entrance, both via Park Plaza Drive
Los Angeles; LA 0.00-R20.74	Cerritos	R20.16	—	183rd Street	Westbound entrance only
Los Angeles; LA 0.00-R20.74	Cerritos	R20.45	20	Carmenita Road	Exits only; eastbound entrance is via Orangethrope Avenue; westbound entrance is via 183rd Street
Orange; ORA R0.00-R18.91	La Palma–Buena Park line	R0.49– R0.85	21	Orangethorpe Avenue, Valley View Street	Signed as exit 22 westbound
Orange; ORA R0.00-R18.91	Buena Park	R1.84	23A	Knott Avenue	
Orange; ORA R0.00-R18.91	Buena Park	R2.62	23B	SR 39 (Beach Boulevard)	
Orange; ORA R0.00-R18.91	Buena Park–Fullerton line	R3.64	24	I-5 south (Santa Ana Freeway) – Santa Ana	Eastbound exit and westbound entrance; I-5 north exit 113C
Orange; ORA R0.00-R18.91	Buena Park–Fullerton line		♦	I-5 south	HOV access only; eastbound exit and westbound entrance
Orange; ORA R0.00-R18.91	Fullerton		East end of Artesia Freeway; west end of Riverside Freeway		
Orange; ORA R0.00-R18.91	Fullerton	R3.73	23C	Magnolia Avenue, Orangethorpe Avenue to I-5	Eastbound exit is part of exit 24; Orangethorpe Avenue not signed eastbound; provides access to I-5 southbound from the westbound 91 and to I-5 northbound from the eastbound 91
Orange; ORA R0.00-R18.91	Anaheim–Fullerton line		♦	I-5 north	HOV access only; westbound exit and eastbound entrance
Orange; ORA R0.00-R18.91	Anaheim–Fullerton line	R3.85	24	I-5 north (Santa Ana Freeway) – Los Angeles	Westbound exit and eastbound entrance; I-5 south exit 114B
Orange; ORA R0.00-R18.91	Anaheim–Fullerton line	1.23	26	Brookhurst Street	
Orange; ORA R0.00-R18.91	Anaheim–Fullerton line	2.23	27	Euclid Street	
Orange; ORA R0.00-R18.91	Anaheim–Fullerton line	3.26– 3.51	28	Harbor Boulevard, Lemon Street, Anaheim Boulevard	Harbor Boulevard was former SR 72
Orange; ORA R0.00-R18.91	Anaheim	4.26	29	East Street, Raymond Avenue	
Orange; ORA R0.00-R18.91	Anaheim	5.26	30A	State College Boulevard	Signed as exit 30 westbound; former SR 250
Orange; ORA R0.00-R18.91	Anaheim		♦	SR 57 north	HOV access only; eastbound exit and westbound entrance
Orange; ORA R0.00-R18.91	Anaheim	6.12	30B	SR 57 (Orange Freeway) – Santa Ana, Pomona	Signed as exit 31 westbound; SR 57 exits 5A-B
Orange; ORA R0.00-R18.91	Anaheim	7.36	31	Kraemer Boulevard, Glassell Street	Signed as exit 32 westbound
Orange; ORA R0.00-R18.91	Anaheim	8.40	33	Tustin Avenue	
Orange; ORA R0.00-R18.91	Anaheim		—	91 Express Lanes	West end of 91 Express Lanes
Orange; ORA R0.00-R18.91	Anaheim	R9.19	34	SR 55 south (Costa Mesa Freeway) – Newport Beach	Left exit westbound; SR 55 north exits 18A-B
Orange; ORA R0.00-R18.91	Anaheim		—	SR 55 south	Express Lanes access only; westbound exit and eastbound entrance
Orange; ORA R0.00-R18.91	Anaheim	R10.09	35	Lakeview Avenue	
Orange; ORA R0.00-R18.91	Anaheim	R11.54	36	SR 90 west (Imperial Highway)	
Orange; ORA R0.00-R18.91	Anaheim	R13.60	Weigh station		
Orange; ORA R0.00-R18.91	Anaheim–Yorba Linda line	R14.43	39	Weir Canyon Road, Yorba Linda Boulevard	
Orange; ORA R0.00-R18.91	Anaheim–Yorba Linda line	R15.93	40	SR 241 Toll south (Eastern Toll Road) – Irvine	Signed as exit 41B westbound; SR 241 north exits 39A-B
Orange; ORA R0.00-R18.91	Anaheim–Yorba Linda line	R15.93	—	SR 241 Toll south	Express Lanes access only; westbound exit and eastbound entrance; scheduled to be completed by 2029
Orange; ORA R0.00-R18.91	Anaheim–Yorba Linda line	R16.40	41	Gypsum Canyon Road	Signed as exit 41A westbound
Orange; ORA R0.00-R18.91	Anaheim–Yorba Linda line	R17.95	42	Coal Canyon Road	Closed in 2003 for environmental reasons
Riverside; RIV R0.00-21.66	Corona	R1.03	44	Green River Road	
Riverside; RIV R0.00-21.66	Corona	R2.09	45	SR 71 north (Chino Valley Freeway) – Ontario, Pomona	
Riverside; RIV R0.00-21.66	Corona	R3.71	47	Serfas Club Drive, Auto Center Drive	
Riverside; RIV R0.00-21.66	Corona	4.16	48	Maple Street, West Sixth Street	Former US 91 / SR 71 south
Riverside; RIV R0.00-21.66	Corona	5.38	49	Lincoln Avenue	Formerly exit 49A eastbound
Riverside; RIV R0.00-21.66	Corona	6.02	49B	Grand Boulevard	Closed in 2015 due to freeway widening
Riverside; RIV R0.00-21.66	Corona	6.34	50	Main Street	Former SR 31
Riverside; RIV R0.00-21.66	Corona	7.45	—	I-15 Express Lanes	Express Lanes access only; eastbound exit and westbound entrance; exit to I-15 south express lanes opened in 2017 and exit to I-15 north express lanes opened in 2023
Riverside; RIV R0.00-21.66	Corona	7.45	—	91 Express Lanes	East end of 91 Express Lanes; opened in 2017
Riverside; RIV R0.00-21.66	Corona	7.45	51	I-15 (Ontario Freeway) – Barstow, San Diego	I-15 north exit 96, south exits 96A-B
Riverside; RIV R0.00-21.66	Corona	9.18	53	McKinley Street	Signed as exits 53A (south) and 53B (north) westbound
Riverside; RIV R0.00-21.66	Riverside	10.81	54	Pierce Street, Riverwalk Parkway	Eastbound exit and westbound entrance
Riverside; RIV R0.00-21.66	Riverside	11.10	55A	Magnolia Avenue	Former US 91
Riverside; RIV R0.00-21.66	Riverside	11.99	55B	La Sierra Avenue	
Riverside; RIV R0.00-21.66	Riverside	13.04	56	Tyler Street	
Riverside; RIV R0.00-21.66	Riverside	14.08	58	Van Buren Boulevard	
Riverside; RIV R0.00-21.66	Riverside	15.63	59	Adams Street, Auto Center Drive	
Riverside; RIV R0.00-21.66	Riverside	16.65	60	Madison Street	
Riverside; RIV R0.00-21.66	Riverside	17.82	61	Arlington Avenue	
Riverside; RIV R0.00-21.66	Riverside	18.41	62	Central Avenue, Riverside Plaza Avenue	
Riverside; RIV R0.00-21.66	Riverside	20.00	63	14th Street	
Riverside; RIV R0.00-21.66	Riverside	20.45– 20.53	64	University Avenue, Mission Inn Avenue – Downtown Riverside	Former US 60 / US 395
Riverside; RIV R0.00-21.66	Riverside	21.47	65A	Spruce Street	Eastbound exit and westbound entrance; westbound exit and entrance via Poplar Street, and eastbound exit and entrance via La Cadena Drive, demolished in 2005 due to reconstruction
Riverside; RIV R0.00-21.66	Riverside	21.66	65B	I-215 south (Escondido Freeway) / SR 60 east (Moreno Valley Freeway) – San Diego, Indio	Eastern terminus; I-215 was former I-15E / US 91 north / US 395; SR 60 east exit 53A; I-215 north exit 34B; Riverside Freeway north follows I-215 north
Riverside; RIV R0.00-21.66	Riverside	21.66	65C	SR 60 west (Pomona Freeway) – Los Angeles	Eastern terminus; I-215 was former I-15E / US 91 north / US 395; SR 60 east exit 53A; I-215 north exit 34B; Riverside Freeway north follows I-215 north
Riverside; RIV R0.00-21.66	Riverside	21.66	—	I-215 north (Riverside Freeway north) – San Bernardino	Eastern terminus; I-215 was former I-15E / US 91 north / US 395; SR 60 east exit 53A; I-215 north exit 34B; Riverside Freeway north follows I-215 north
1.000 mi = 1.609 km; 1.000 km = 0.621 mi: Closed/former; Electronic toll collection; HOV only; Incomplete access; Route transition; Unopened

== See also ==
U.S. Route 91
Previous state: Terminus (historical)	California (historical)	Next state: Nevada (historical)
