= California State Route 26 (1937–1964) =

Former state highway in southern California, United States

State Route 26

Route information
- Maintained by Caltrans
- Existed: 1937–1964

Major junctions
- West end: US 101 Alt. in Santa Monica
- SR 7 in Sawtelle; US 6 / SR 11 in Downtown Los Angeles; US 101 Byp. from East Los Angeles to Commerce; SR 15 from East Los Angeles to Downey; SR 35 in Santa Fe Springs
- East end: SR 39 in Buena Park

Location
- Country: United States
- State: California
- Counties: Los Angeles, Orange

Highway system
- State highways in California; Interstate; US; State; Scenic; History; Pre‑1964; Unconstructed; Deleted; Freeways

State Route 26 (SR 26) was a state highway in Los Angeles and Orange counties in the U.S. state of California, from 1937 to 1964. It traveled from U.S. Route 101 Alternate (US 101 Alt.) in Santa Monica to SR 39 in Buena Park. It was the primary route connecting Santa Monica and Downtown Los Angeles, as opposed to U.S. Route 66 (US 66).

== Route description ==
The highway originally traveled along 10th Street in Los Angeles, but as Olympic Boulevard was built out to the west and east, it was aligned to that. East of Los Angeles, the highway turned southeast along the Anaheim Telegraph Road, which it followed into Santa Fe Springs. It then continued along Los Nietos Road, Valley View Avenue, and Stage Road before its terminus at La Habra Road (now Beach Boulevard). The portion east of Downtown Los Angeles was eventually deleted from the system as redundant to US 101 Byp. which later became Interstate 5 (I-5).

== History ==
State Route 6
- Location: Southern California
- Existed: 1934–1937

The route was assigned pre-1964 Legislative Route 173 (LR 173), defined in 1933 from Santa Monica to East Los Angeles. Between Santa Monica and Los Angeles, it was later replaced by the Santa Monica Freeway, and added to the Interstate Highway System on September 15, 1955. East of East Los Angeles, it was assigned LR 166.

The highway was known as State Route 6 from 1934 to 1937.

The current SR 26 was designated in the 1964 renumbering in California to run in Northern California between Stockton in San Joaquin County and Pioneer in Amador County.

== Major intersections ==
County	Location	mi	km	Destinations	Notes
Los Angeles	Santa Monica	0.0	0.0	US 101 Alt. (Pacific Coast Highway) – Oxnard	Western terminus
Los Angeles	Sawtelle	3.4	5.5	SR 7 (Sepulveda Boulevard) – Long Beach, Santa Clarita	
Los Angeles	Downtown Los Angeles			US 6 / SR 11 (Figueroa Street) – San Pedro, Pasadena, Santa Clarita	
Los Angeles	East Los Angeles			US 101 Byp. north (Indiana Street) to US 101 – Hollywood, Ventura	Western end of US 101 Bypass overlap
Los Angeles	East Los Angeles			SR 15 north (Atlantic Boulevard) – Pasadena	Western end of SR 15 overlap
Los Angeles	Commerce			SR 15 south (Atlantic Boulevard) – Long Beach	Eastern end of SR 15 overlap
Los Angeles	Downey			US 101 Byp. south (Rosemead Boulevard)	Eastern end of US 101 Bypass overlap
Los Angeles	Santa Fe Springs			SR 35 (Norwalk Boulevard)	
Orange	Buena Park			SR 39 (La Habra Road)	Eastern terminus
1.000 mi = 1.609 km; 1.000 km = 0.621 mi: Concurrency terminus

== See also ==
- Interstate 10 in California
- U.S. Route 6 in California
- List of deleted state highways in California
