= List of awards and honors received by Richard Nixon =

This article lists awards and honors received by Richard Nixon, the 37th president of the United States from 1969 to 1974.

== Honorary degrees ==
Nixon received honorary degrees from the following educational institutions:

- Bradley University, Doctor of Laws, 1951
- University of Tehran, 1953
- Lowell Technological Institute, Doctor of Science, 1954
- Whittier College, Doctor of Laws, 1954
- Temple University, Doctor of Humane Letters, 1955
- Lafayette College, Doctor of Laws, 1956
- Bethany College, Doctor of Laws, 1957
- Defiance College, Doctor of Laws, 1957
- DePauw University, Doctor of Laws, 1957
- Michigan State University, Doctor of Laws, 1957
- Wilberforce University, Doctor of Humanities, 1957
- Yeshiva University, Doctor of Laws, 1957
- Fordham University, Doctor of Laws, 1959
- Thiel College, Doctor of Humane Letters, 1959
- University of San Diego, Doctor of Laws, 1959

== Other honors ==
- Egypt's Order of the Nile, 1974
- Member of France's Académie des Beaux-Arts, elected 1985, inducted 1987
- National Fitness Foundation's Public Service Award, 1986

== Namesakes ==
- Richard M. Nixon Parkway, Yorba Linda, California
- Richard M. Nixon Elementary School, Yorba Linda, California
- Nixon Elementary School, Hiawatha, Iowa
- Richard M. Nixon High School, Monrovia, Liberia
- Nixon Library, Yuen Long, Hong Kong

== Postage stamps ==
Richard Nixon has appeared on the following postage stamps:

- A United States 32-cent commemorative stamp, issued April 26, 1995.
- A set of six stamps from Umm Al Quwain in 1972, commemorating Nixon's visit to China.
- Two Nevis $3 commemorative stamps, issued May 21, 2010 as part of a pane commemorating the 50th anniversary of John F. Kennedy's election as President.
- Liberia stamps issued in 1982 and 2009 as part of series commemorating U.S. presidents.

== See also ==
- Presidential memorials in the United States
