= CA6 =

CA6 may refer to:

- California's 6th congressional district
- CAC Wackett, an aircraft
- California State Route 6 (1934)
- Carbonic anhydrase 6, encoded by the CA6 gene
- United States Court of Appeals for the Sixth Circuit
- USS California (ACR-6), a ship
