= California State Route 90 =

State highway in California

State Route 90
- SR 90 highlighted in red; gaps indicate the unconstructed or relinquished portions

Route information
- Maintained by Caltrans
- Length: 11.68 mi (18.80 km) SR 90 is broken into pieces due to an unconstructed portion, and the length does not reflect the gap. Also, portions of SR 90 have been relinquished to or are otherwise maintained by local or other governments, and are not included in the length.
- Existed: 1964 renumbering–present

Western segment
- West end: SR 1 in Los Angeles
- Major intersections: I-405 in Culver City
- East end: West Slauson Avenue in Culver City

Eastern segment
- West end: SR 39 in La Habra
- Major intersections: SR 57 in Brea
- East end: SR 91 in Anaheim

Location
- Country: United States
- State: California
- Counties: Los Angeles, Orange

Highway system
- State highways in California; Interstate; US; State; Scenic; History; Pre‑1964; Unconstructed; Deleted; Freeways
← SR 89	→ SR 91

State Route 90 (SR 90) is an east-west state highway in the U.S. state of California that consists of non-contiguous segments in Greater Los Angeles. The highway was initially planned to connect southwestern Los Angeles and Anaheim Hills, but a gap in the route exists from Culver City to La Habra due to community opposition to its construction.

Most of the constructed western portion of SR 90 is the Marina Freeway, a short freeway in southwestern Los Angeles and the nearby suburbs, linking Marina del Rey. It begins at Lincoln Boulevard (State Route 1) near Marina del Rey as the Marina Expressway. It then goes past a few intersections before becoming the Marina Freeway. It then continues eastward approximately along the border between the Del Rey and Westchester neighborhoods of the city of Los Angeles before terminating in Slauson Avenue in southern Culver City to just past Culver Boulevard.

The eastern portion of SR 90 runs along Imperial Highway between Beach Boulevard (State Route 39) in La Habra and State Route 91 in Anaheim Hills, also passing through Fullerton, Brea, Placentia, and Yorba Linda. Though some maps and signs may still mark SR 90 as continuous through the city of Yorba Linda, control of the segment within the city was relinquished to that local jurisdiction in 2002 and is thus no longer officially part of the state highway system. The portion of the road in Yorba Linda between Esperanza Road and Yorba Linda Boulevard is built to freeway standards; the city renamed it the Richard M. Nixon Freeway in honor of the 37th President of the United States, Richard Nixon, who was born in Yorba Linda less than half a mile away from the road.

== Route description ==
Route 90 is defined in section 390, subdivision (a), of the California Streets and Highways Code, and that the highway is "from Route 1 northwest of the Los Angeles International Airport to Route 91 in Santa Ana Canyon passing near La Habra, except for the portion within the city limits of Yorba Linda". The definition includes the gap that was never constructed, as well as referencing the segment within Yorba Linda's borders that was relinquished by the state to the city. Subdivisions (b), (c), and (d) further mandate that the relinquished segment is no longer eligible to be re-adopted as a state highway, the city must still ensure the continuity of traffic flow on it, and must still "maintain signs directing motorists to the continuation of Route 90".

The west segment of SR 90 begins at Lincoln Boulevard (State Route 1) in the Del Rey district of Los Angeles. It heads east along the Marina Expressway, past several intersections, and becomes the Marina Freeway after crossing Ballona Creek. After two interchanges - with Centinela Avenue and Interstate 405 - SR 90 and the freeway end at Slauson Avenue.

The east segment begins at the intersection of Imperial Highway and Beach Boulevard (State Route 39) in La Habra. It heads east and southeast on Imperial Highway, ending at State Route 91 about 1/4 mile (400 m) after crossing the Santa Ana River from Yorba Linda into Anaheim. A portion of the road in Yorba Linda is built to freeway standards; it is now known as the Richard M. Nixon Parkway. Caltrans relinquished the entire portion of the route through the City of Yorba Linda in 2002. However, the same state law that authorized relinquishment required the city to "maintain signs directing motorists to the continuation of Route 90".

SR 90 is part of the California Freeway and Expressway System, and is part of the National Highway System, a network of highways that are considered essential to the country's economy, defense, and mobility by the Federal Highway Administration.

== History ==
Legislative Route 221 (the Slauson Freeway, now the Marina Freeway) was defined in 1947 to run from Legislative Route 60 (now State Route 1) east to Legislative Route 165 (now Interstate 110). A 1959 extension took it east to Legislative Route 170 (now Interstate 605).

To the east, Legislative Route 176 (the Yorba Linda Freeway, now also the Marina Freeway) was defined in 1939 from pre-1964 Legislative Route 62 (now State Route 39) east and southeast to pre-1964 Legislative Route 43 (now State Route 91). A 1959 extension took it west to pre-1964 Legislative Route 174 (later State Route 42) near Norwalk.

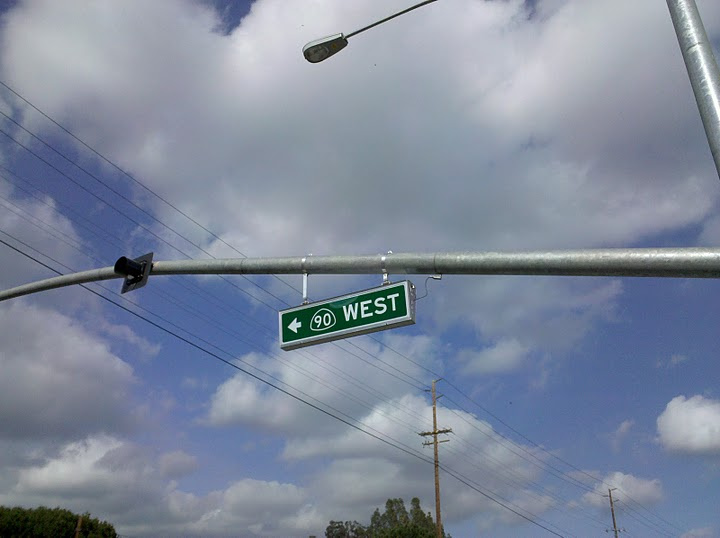
A sign at Esperanza Rd. / Orangethorpe Ave.

In the 1964 renumbering, LR 221 was assigned State Route 90, but LR 176 all became part of State Route 42, along with the connecting LR 174 to the west. The piece of LR 176 between I-605 and SR 39 was reassigned to SR 90 in 1965, and the rest east to SR 91 became part of SR 90 in 1968 (at the same time as SR 42 became Interstate 105). The actual I-105 freeway was later constructed in 1993.

Originally planned as the Slauson Freeway, Route 90 was slated to extend across southern Los Angeles County and northern Orange County, ending at the Riverside Freeway in eastern Anaheim, mostly parallel to Slauson Avenue. The full route was added to the California Freeway and Expressway System in 1959. By the 1960s, community opposition had reduced it to what is effectively a minor spur of I-405 to Marina Del Rey (derisively dubbed the "Slauson Cutoff" by comedian Johnny Carson). It was renamed the Richard M. Nixon Freeway for a brief period in the early 1970s, but after Nixon's resignation in the wake of the Watergate scandal, its name was changed to the current appellation.

From I-405 west to Centinela Avenue, the Marina Freeway is 8 lanes wide, before it quickly narrows to 4 lanes at the Culver Boulevard exit. The freeway ends approximately 1/2 mile (800 m) west of Culver Boulevard, and continues as an expressway. There was talk of extending the Marina Expressway slightly west of Lincoln Boulevard (Route 1) to Admiralty Way (approximately 1/4 mile [400 m]) to accommodate ongoing expansion of the Marina Del Rey area. Strong opposition, the acquisition of surrounding properties, and potentially infringing on a public park along Admiralty, which contains a section of the Marvin Braude Bike Trail killed the proposal.

In 2002, the City of Yorba Linda assumed responsibility for Imperial Highway to complete various construction projects within city limits when the State Assembly passed AB 887; it lost its state route designation in the process and is now called the Richard M. Nixon Parkway within the city.

By 2005, construction on the western end of the Marina Freeway began, to extend the freeway terminus from Culver Boulevard to approximately 1/2 mile (800 m) west of Culver Boulevard by building a full interchange at Culver. The freeway extension was completed in early 2007. The freeway extension also allows Route 90 drivers to avoid a traffic signal at Alla Road (just west of Culver Boulevard.). After the end of the freeway, a pair of frontage roads operating as an expressway continues as Route 90 up to Route 1 (Lincoln Boulevard). Signalized intersections occur at Mindanao Way and Lincoln Boulevard, which is the end of the expressway in Marina del Rey. The reason for the extension is to relieve traffic congestion on surface streets.

== Major intersections ==
Except where prefixed with a letter, postmiles were measured on the road as it was in 1964, based on the alignment that existed at the time, and do not necessarily reflect current mileage. Postmile prefixes include: R reflecting a realignment in the route since then, M indicating a second realignment, L referring to an overlap due to a correction or change, and T indicating postmiles classified as temporary. Segments that remain unconstructed or have been relinquished to local control may be omitted. The numbers reset at county lines; the start and end postmiles in each county are given in the county column.

County	Location	Postmile	Exit	Destinations	Notes
Los Angeles; LA 0.92-T3.28	Los Angeles	0.92		SR 1 (Lincoln Boulevard)	West end of SR 90
Los Angeles; LA 0.92-T3.28	Los Angeles	1.20		Mindanao Way	
Los Angeles; LA 0.92-T3.28	Los Angeles	1.55	West end of freeway		
Los Angeles; LA 0.92-T3.28	Los Angeles	1.75		Culver Boulevard	
Los Angeles; LA 0.92-T3.28	Los Angeles	R1.72	1	Centinela Avenue	
Los Angeles; LA 0.92-T3.28	Culver City	2.65	2	I-405 north (San Diego Freeway) – Sacramento	Former SR 7 north; I-405 south exit 50B
Los Angeles; LA 0.92-T3.28	Culver City	2.65	2	I-405 south (San Diego Freeway) – Long Beach	Eastbound exit and westbound entrance; former SR 7 south; I-405 north exit 50A
Los Angeles; LA 0.92-T3.28	Culver City	3.00		Sepulveda Boulevard	Eastbound entrance only
Los Angeles; LA 0.92-T3.28	Culver City	T3.28		Slauson Avenue	At-grade intersection; east end of western segment of SR 90
Gap in route
Orange; ORA 0.50-12.83	La Habra	0.50		Imperial Highway	Continuation beyond SR 39
Orange; ORA 0.50-12.83	La Habra	0.50		SR 39 (Beach Boulevard) – Buena Park, Huntington Beach	West end of eastern segment of SR 90
Orange; ORA 0.50-12.83	La Habra	1.01		Idaho Street	
Orange; ORA 0.50-12.83	La Habra	1.76		Euclid Street	
Orange; ORA 0.50-12.83	La Habra	2.50		Harbor Boulevard – Fullerton	Former US 101 / SR 72
Orange; ORA 0.50-12.83	Brea	4.39		Brea Boulevard	
Orange; ORA 0.50-12.83	Brea	5.19		State College Boulevard – Brea	
Orange; ORA 0.50-12.83	Fullerton–Brea line	R5.45		SR 57 (Orange Freeway) – Santa Ana, Pomona	Interchange; SR 57 exit 9
Orange; ORA 0.50-12.83	Brea	6.59		Kraemer Boulevard – Placentia	
Orange; ORA 0.50-12.83	Brea	7.27		SR 142 east (Valencia Avenue) – Chino Hills, Chino	Western terminus of SR 142
Orange; ORA 0.50-12.83	Placentia	7.96		Rose Drive	
Orange; ORA 0.50-12.83	Placentia–Yorba Linda line	8.10	East end of state maintenance		
Orange; ORA 0.50-12.83	Yorba Linda	9.95		Yorba Linda Boulevard – Yorba Linda	
Orange; ORA 0.50-12.83	Yorba Linda–Anaheim line	11.15		Kellogg Drive	Interchange
Orange; ORA 0.50-12.83	Yorba Linda–Anaheim line	12.03	West end of state maintenance		
Orange; ORA 0.50-12.83	Anaheim	12.27		Orangethorpe Avenue, Esperanza Road	Interchange
Orange; ORA 0.50-12.83	Anaheim	12.60		La Palma Avenue	
Orange; ORA 0.50-12.83	Anaheim	12.83		SR 91 (Riverside Freeway) – Newport Beach, Los Angeles, Riverside, Beach Cities	Interchange; east end of SR 90; SR 91 exit 36
Orange; ORA 0.50-12.83	Anaheim	12.83		Imperial Highway	Continuation beyond SR 91
1.000 mi = 1.609 km; 1.000 km = 0.621 mi: Incomplete access
