= Harbor Boulevard =

North–south road corridor in the counties of Los Angeles and Orange

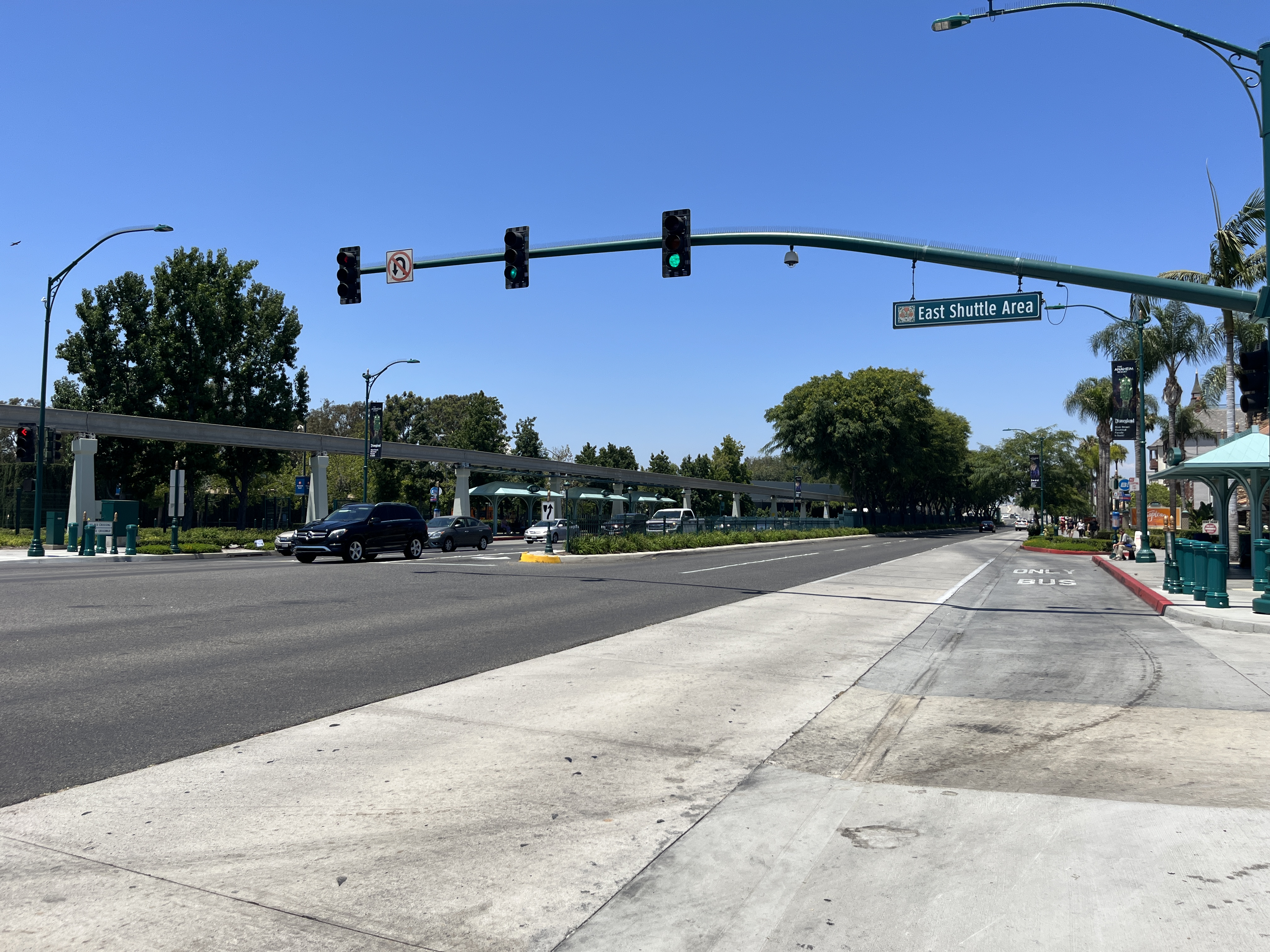
- Harbor Boulevard in its stretch adjacent to the Disneyland Resort
- Interactive map of Harbor Boulevard
- Maintained by: Local jurisdictions
- Length: 23.4 mi (37.7 km)
- South end: SR 55 in Costa Mesa
- Major junctions: I-405 in Costa Mesa; SR 22 in Garden Grove; I-5 in Anaheim; SR 91 in Anaheim; SR 90 in Fullerton; SR 39 in La Habra
- North end: Fullerton Road and Pathfinder Road in Rowland Heights

Harbor Boulevard (formerly Spadra Road) is a north–south road corridor in the counties of Los Angeles and Orange. One of the busiest routes in Orange County, the thoroughfare passes through some of the most densely populated areas in the region and carries about 8 percent of the county's bus riders. The route provides access for local residents to travel to work and for drivers travelling from Valley Boulevard in the City of Industry via Fullerton Road to Newport Beach.

== Route description ==
Harbor Boulevard runs in Orange County from Costa Mesa through the cities of Fountain Valley, Santa Ana, Garden Grove, Anaheim, Fullerton, and La Habra. It crosses into Los Angeles County upon entering La Habra Heights, then 2 miles later, it turns into Fullerton Road in the unincorporated community of Rowland Heights just over the Los Angeles County line.

== History ==
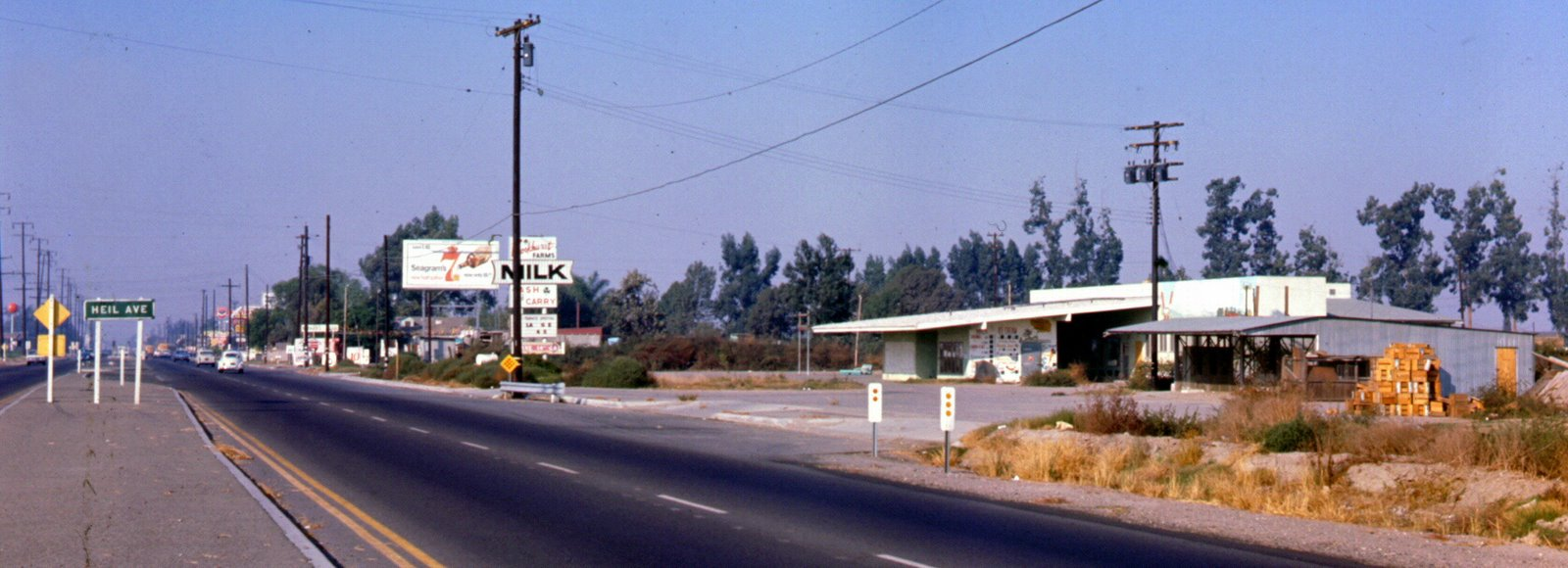
Harbor Boulevard at Heil Avenue, Fountain Valley, c. 1960s

Previously, Harbor Boulevard ended at Fullerton Road in La Habra Heights. Commuters were directed to turn left onto Fullerton Road through a two-lane windy road to Pathfinder Road. An extension was proposed to extend Harbor Boulevard to Pathfinder Road in Rowland Heights in the 1980s. This extension would provide an alternate route for commuters coming from Orange County as they were limited to Hacienda Road, Brea Boulevard, and SR 57 at the time. The route would also connect Los Angeles County with Orange County with the developing unincorporated community Rowland Heights and provide access to SR 60 from Orange County. Originally opposed by residents of La Habra Heights, with one person stating that Harbor Boulevard would become a "freeway", the four-lane extension was granted when Shea Homes broke ground for their newest community, Vantage Pointe, in Rowland Heights. The extension opened in 1992, though the two-lane Fullerton Road is still open for residents who live on that street to use.

The portion of Harbor Boulevard between La Palma Avenue in Anaheim to Whittier Boulevard in La Habra was part of the historical routing of U.S. Route 101 (US 101), which was at the time the Coast Route from the Mexican Border to Oregon. This portion was also formerly part of SR 72, but this segment was later relinquished to the cities of Anaheim, Fullerton, and La Habra.

When the extension of Harbor Boulevard opened in 1992, there were plans to make Harbor Boulevard the official SR 39 between Whittier Boulevard and Colima Road in order to close the gap SR 39 currently has, but signs were never erected and it is unknown when this segment will be signed.

North Harbor Boulevard, where it rises from La Habra and passes over the Puente Hills, follows the historical route of the 1769 Portolà expedition, first Europeans to explore inland California.

In 1976, the Orange County District Attorney declared the stretch in Garden Grove with six gay bars a "red light area" and attempted to close the bars. While formal charges were filed, they were dismissed a year later with no convictions.

Protest marches over the Anaheim police shootings in July 2012 were centered around Harbor. A fatal shooting by police officers on July 21 was followed by a second on July 22. On July 29, 200 protesters walked from the Anaheim police headquarters toward Disneyland. They were stopped at the intersection of Harbor Boulevard and Ball Road by a line of riot police and officers on horseback. Both shootings were eventually ruled justified by the Orange County District Attorney.

== Public transit ==
Harbor Boulevard is the busiest north–south transit corridor in Orange County, carrying a substantial share of Orange County Transportation Authority (OCTA) bus ridership. From 2016 to 2018, OCTA conducted the Central Harbor Boulevard Transit Corridor Study, which examined options to improve transit along the corridor through the cities of Santa Ana, Garden Grove, Anaheim, and Fullerton. The study evaluated twelve conceptual alternatives across several modes, including enhanced bus, bus rapid transit, and streetcar service. In technical scoring, the streetcar and bus rapid transit options rated highest, but in June 2018 the OCTA Board of Directors instead favored an "enhanced bus" package—the least costly option—incorporating measures such as off-board fare collection, all-door boarding, transit signal priority, and queue-jump lanes.

Separately, the OC Streetcar, a light-rail line under construction in Santa Ana and Garden Grove, has its western terminus at a planned transit center on Harbor Boulevard just north of Westminster Avenue.

== Major intersections ==
County	Location	mi	km	Destinations	Notes
Orange	Costa Mesa	0.0	0.0	SR 55 (Newport Boulevard)	Southern terminus
Orange	Costa Mesa	3.8	6.1	I-405 (San Diego Freeway) – San Diego, Long Beach	I-405 north exit 11, south exit 11B
Orange	Santa Ana	4.5	7.2	MacArthur Boulevard	
Orange	Garden Grove	8.8	14.2	SR 22 (Garden Grove Freeway) – Long Beach, Orange	SR 22 exits 12A-B
Orange	Garden Grove	9.2	14.8	Garden Grove Boulevard	Former SR 22
Orange	Anaheim	12.2	19.6	I-5 (Santa Ana Freeway) – Los Angeles, Santa Ana	I-5 exit 110A
Orange	Anaheim	13.5	21.7	Lincoln Avenue	Former SR 214
Orange	Anaheim	14.9	24.0	SR 91 (Riverside Freeway) – Beach Cities, Riverside	SR 91 exit 28
Orange	Fullerton	17.0	27.4	Brea Boulevard	Former SR 57
Orange	Fullerton	19.4	31.2	SR 90 (Imperial Highway)	
Orange	La Habra	20.8	33.5	SR 39 south (Whittier Boulevard)	Northern terminus of SR 39; to SR 72
Los Angeles	Rowland Heights	23.4	37.7	Fullerton Road / Pathfinder Road	Continuation north; to SR 60
1.000 mi = 1.609 km; 1.000 km = 0.621 mi

== Points of interest ==
=== At Disneyland ===
- Anaheim Convention Center

=== Outside of Disneyland ===
- Crystal Cathedral
- Fox Theatre Fullerton
- Whittier Law School
- Orange Coast College

=== Former ===
- Kona Lanes

== In popular culture ==
Anaheim native Gwen Stefani mentions Harbor Boulevard in the song "Cool".
