= 1964 state highway renumbering (California) =

Highway renumbering

This article is part of the highway renumbering series.
Alabama	1928, 1957
Arkansas	1926
California	1964
Colorado	1953, 1968
Connecticut	1932, 1963
Florida	1945
Indiana	1926
Iowa	1926, 1969
Louisiana	1955
Maine	1933
Massachusetts	1933
Minnesota	1934
Missouri	1926
Montana	1932
Nebraska	1926
Nevada	1976
New Jersey	1927, 1953
New Mexico	1926, 1988
New York	1927, 1930
North Carolina	1934, 1937, 1940, 1961
North Dakota	1926
Ohio	1923, 1927, 1962
Pennsylvania	1928, 1961
Puerto Rico	1953
South Carolina	1928, 1937
South Dakota	1927, 1975
Tennessee	1983
Texas	1939, 1990
Utah	1962, 1977
Virginia	1923, 1928, 1933, 1940, 1958
Washington	1964
Wisconsin	1926
Wyoming	1927

In 1963 and 1964, the California Division of Highways, at the behest of the California State Legislature, implemented a major renumbering of its state highways.

The majority of sign routes—those marked for the public—kept their numbers. The main changes were to the legislative routes— those same routes which were defined in state law typically with different numbers,— which had their numbers changed to match the sign routes.

Many formerly unsigned routes received sign numbers corresponding to their new legislative numbers. A smaller change was the removal and truncating of many U.S. Routes in favor of the Interstate Highways (designated in 1959), and the renumbering of State Routes that conflicted with Interstate numbers. Some U.S. Routes that were officially removed continued to be signed until the replacement Interstates were completed.

The state law authorizing the renumbering was passed by the Legislature on September 20, 1963. Signage changes took place by July 1, 1964.

== Changes in sign routes ==
=== U.S. Routes ===
- U.S. Route 6 was truncated to Bishop. The part south of Bishop was replaced by U.S. Route 395, State Route 14, Interstate 5, State Route 11 (now renumbered Interstate 110), and State Route 1 to the old U.S. 6 terminus at the Los Alamitos Circle in Long Beach.
- U.S. Route 40 became Interstate 80.
- U.S. Route 40 Alternate became new State Route 113 and State Route 70.
- U.S. Route 40 Business became new State Route 123.
- U.S. Route 50 was truncated to Sacramento. West from Sacramento, it became new State Route 99, existing State Route 4, Interstate 5, Interstate 205, Interstate 580, and Interstate 80.
- U.S. Route 60 became Interstate 10 east of Beaumont and the new State Route 60 west from Beaumont to the East L.A. interchange.
- U.S. Route 66 was truncated to Pasadena, becoming State Route 159 (from U.S. Route 66 Alternate) and an extension of State Route 2. East of Pasadena, it was continued to be signed, but was officially State Route 248, Interstate 210, State Route 30 (extended from its pre-1964 route), State Route 66, Interstate 15 and Interstate 40.
- U.S. Route 66 Alternate became State Route 159.
- U.S. Route 70 became Interstate 10 and State Route 212 and was eliminated in California (it now terminates in Globe, Arizona).
- U.S. Route 80 became Interstate 8 and was deleted from California (its terminus is now in Dallas, Texas).
- U.S. Route 91 became existing State Route 19, new State Route 214, part of new State Route 91, and Interstate 15.
- U.S. Route 99 was eliminated, along with U.S. Route 99E and U.S. Route 99W. South of Sacramento, US 99 became an extended State Route 111, a new State Route 86, Interstate 10, Interstate 5, State Route 99, and a new State Route 204. US 99E became Interstate 80, an extended State Route 65, a new State Route 70, and State Route 99, while US 99W became Interstate 80, a new State Route 113, and Interstate 5. US 99 north of the merge also became Interstate 5.
- U.S. Route 101 was truncated to Los Angeles; the eliminated portion became part of Interstate 5 and a new State Route 72. Two parts became freeway; the old route became State Route 82 and State Route 254.
- U.S. Route 101 Bypass in the San Francisco Bay Area became a relocated U.S. Route 101.
- U.S. Route 101 Alternate in Southern California became part of an extended State Route 1.
- U.S. Route 101 from San Jose to San Francisco became a new State Route 82.
- U.S. Route 299 became the majority of the new State Route 299.
- U.S. Route 399 became an extension (and relocation) of State Route 33 and a new State Route 119.
- U.S. Route 466 became a relocation of State Route 41, a new State Route 46, a new State Route 58, and Interstate 15.
- U.S. Route 95, U.S. Route 97, U.S. Route 199 and U.S. Route 395 remained the same. (US 395 has since been truncated at Adelanto and is now part of Interstate 15 from Adelanto to its north junction with Interstate 215, Interstate 215 to its south junction with Interstate 15, Interstate 15 to State Route 163, and State Route 163 to Interstate 5 in San Diego.)

=== State Routes ===
All available numbers up to and including State Route 255 were assigned in 1964; State Route 256 and above were assigned starting in 1965.

- State Route 1 was extended south along U.S. Route 101 Alternate. One section (Route 1 was split there and part was unbuilt) became State Route 208.
- State Route 2 was extended west along U.S. Route 66. The section east of State Route 138 was replaced by State Route 138.
- State Route 5 was replaced by State Route 35 because of Interstate 5.
- State Route 7 replaced State Route 15 because of Interstate 15. Former SR 7 became Interstate 405.
- State Route 8 was replaced by State Route 26 because of Interstate 8.
- State Route 9 was shortened and relocated along a formerly unsigned state route. The old route became part of State Route 85, State Route 237, part of State Route 17 (now Interstate 880), State Route 262, Interstate 680, and State Route 238.
- State Route 10 was replaced by State Route 42 several years before the 1964 renumbering, due to the closeness of Interstate 10.
- State Route 11 was relocated onto a freeway. The old route became State Route 159.
- State Route 12 was relocated along an unconstructed route. The old route to SR 1 became part of State Route 116
- State Route 14 replaced part of U.S. Route 6. Former SR 14 became part of State Route 91.
- State Route 15 was replaced by State Route 7 because of Interstate 15.
- State Route 18 replaced part of State Route 30 south of Big Bear Lake. The old route became part of State Route 38.
- State Route 24 was truncated and relocated along an unconstructed route; the old route was replaced by State Route 242, State Route 4, State Route 13, State Route 160, State Route 16, State Route 113, State Route 99, and State Route 70.
- State Route 26 replaced State Route 8 because of Interstate 8. Former SR 26 became part of Interstate 10 west of Downtown Los Angeles, and the remainder was deleted from the system.
- State Route 29 was rerouted along part of State Route 53 and along a formerly unsigned state route. The old route became part of State Route 175.
- State Route 30 was truncated, with one part being replaced by rerouted State Route 18.
- State Route 33 was extended south along U.S. Route 399. It was rerouted along a formerly unsigned route. The old route became State Route 207.
- State Route 35 replaced State Route 5 because of Interstate 5. Former SR 35 became Interstate 605.
- State Route 37 was rerouted over Former SR 48. The old route became State Route 121.
- State Route 38 had extended west over part of State Route 18.
- State Route 41 had been rerouted over part of U.S. Route 466. The old route became part of State Route 46.
- State Route 42 had replaced State Route 10 several years before the 1964 renumbering, due to the closeness of Interstate 10.
- State Route 46 replaced part of U.S. Route 466 and part of State Route 41.
- State Route 48 was reassigned to part of State Route 138 and a partially unconstructed route. Former SR 48 became part of rerouted State Route 37.
- State Route 53 was truncated. The deleted part became a rerouting of State Route 29.
- State Route 58 replaced part of U.S. Route 466 and part of State Route 178. The new number was the same as the old legislative number, possibly by coincidence.
- State Route 60 replaced part of U.S. Route 60, as well as a new alignment.
- State Route 65 was relocated and extended north to replace part of U.S. Route 99E. The old route was renumbered as State Route 69.
- State Route 66 replaced part of U.S. Route 66.
- State Route 69 replaced part of relocated State Route 65.
- State Route 70 replaced parts of truncated State Route 24 and former U.S. Route 40 Alternate.
- State Route 71 was rerouted onto a freeway. The old route became State Route 215.
- State Route 72 replaced part of relocated U.S. Route 101.
- State Route 79 was rerouted onto a previously unsigned state route. The old route became County Road R3.
- State Route 82 replaced part of relocated U.S. Route 101.
- State Route 85 replaced part of State Route 9.
- State Route 86 replaced part of U.S. Route 99.
- State Route 91 replaced State Route 14 and part of U.S. Route 91.
- State Route 99 replaced much of U.S. Route 99 and U.S. Route 99E, with a new alignment between Sacramento and Olivehurst.
- State Route 111 was extended south over part of U.S. Route 99.
- State Route 113 replaced parts of U.S. Route 99W, U.S. Route 40 Alternate, and State Route 24.
- State Route 116 replaced part of State Route 12.
- State Route 118 had sections replaced by I-210.
- State Route 119 replaced part of U.S. Route 399.
- State Route 123 replaced U.S. Route 40 Business.
- State Route 138 extended east over part of State Route 2 and was rerouted over an unconstructed route.
- State Route 150 was relocated along a previously unsigned route. The old route was renumbered as State Route 192.
- State Route 154 had one part renumbered as State Route 246.
- State Route 159 replaced part of State Route 11 and part of U.S. Route 66.
- State Route 178 was truncated. The deleted part was transferred to State Route 58.
- State Route 192 replaced part of State Route 150.
- State Route 204 replaced part of U.S. Route 99.
- State Route 207 replaced part of State Route 33.
- State Route 208 replaced part of State Route 1.
- State Route 212 replaced part of U.S. Route 60 and U.S. Route 70.
- State Route 214 replaced part of U.S. Route 91
- State Route 215 replaced part of State Route 71.
- State Route 237 replaced part of State Route 9.
- State Route 238 replaced part of State Route 9.
- State Route 246 replaced part of State Route 154.
- State Route 254 replaced part of relocated U.S. Route 101.
- State Route 299 replaced U.S. Route 299.
