= Interstate 605 =

Interstate Highway in California

Interstate 605
- San Gabriel River Freeway
- I-605 highlighted in red

Route information
- Auxiliary route of I-5
- Maintained by Caltrans
- Length: 27.40 mi (44.10 km)
- History: 1940s as a state highway, 1964 as a number
- NHS: Entire route

Major junctions
- South end: I-405 / SR 22 in Seal Beach
- SR 91 in Cerritos; I-105 in Norwalk; I-5 in Santa Fe Springs; SR 60 in Avocado Heights; I-10 in Baldwin Park; I-210 in Irwindale
- North end: Huntington Drive in Duarte

Location
- Country: United States
- State: California
- Counties: Orange, Los Angeles

Highway system
- Interstate Highway System; Main; Auxiliary; Suffixed; Business; Future; State highways in California; Interstate; US; State; Scenic; History; Pre‑1964; Unconstructed; Deleted; Freeways
← I-580	→ I-680

Interstate 605 (abbreviated I-605, officially known as the San Gabriel River Freeway) is a 27-mile-long (43 km) major north–south auxiliary Interstate Highway in the Greater Los Angeles urban area of Southern California. It runs from I-405 and State Route 22 (SR 22) in Seal Beach in Orange County to I-210 just south of the Irwindale–Duarte border in Los Angeles County. The San Gabriel River Freeway closely parallels the San Gabriel River for most of its alignment, hence its name, which is one of the few Southern California freeways not named after a city along its route. But similar to other freeways in the area, I-605 is also known colloquially as "the 605" to Southern California residents.

Aside from changes to the interchange with I-105 (which did not open until the early 1990s), and the addition of an HOV lane between I-405 and I-10, I-605 is one of the only remaining freeways that kept its original alignment throughout its run through Los Angeles County since it first opened.

== Route description ==
The entirety of I-605 is defined in section 619 of the California Streets and Highways Code as Route 605, and that the highway is from:

(a) Route 1 near Seal Beach to Route 405.
(b) Route 405 to Route 210 near Duarte.

The segment defined in subdivision (a) remains unconstructed, and is not included in the Federal Highway Administration (FHWA)'s Interstate Highway route logs.

The southern terminus of I-605 is at the San Diego (I-405) and Garden Grove (SR 22) Freeways in Seal Beach. This interchange was built to accommodate the aforementioned southern extension to SR 1. From there, I-605 runs roughly north through the Gateway Cities of the Los Angeles Basin. It then shifts north-northeast, crossing the Whittier Narrows and across the San Gabriel Valley. I-605 then ends at its junction with the Foothill Freeway, (I-210) just south of the Irwindale–Duarte border. Ramps from I-605 then extend north to Huntington Drive in Duarte.

I-605 follows most of the length of the San Gabriel River from the San Diego Freeway in Seal Beach to the Santa Fe Dam. Typically dry riverbed and flood basins are visible from many portions of the route, especially near the northern terminus.

In the mid-2000s, a HOV lane was added for motorists with two or more people to use between I-405 and I-10. The HOV lane ends at I-10 and there are no plans to extend it to I-210 at this time. With the addition of the HOV lane, the left shoulder was eliminated to avoid massive costs to widen the freeway. The highway also suffers from traffic jams regularly, especially the junction with I-5 (the Santa Ana Freeway). Newer signs with exit numbers replaced the older signs between the Orange County line and I-10 in 2016, with the completion of the I-605 and I-10 junction improvement. I-605 is one of the only Southern California freeways without destinations (control cities) such as "Seal Beach" or "Irwindale" since its opening. Rather, cardinal directions ("NORTH" or "SOUTH"), and a simple "THRU TRAFFIC" designation in place of control cities, are used on signs along I-605 itself.

I-605 is part of the California Freeway and Expressway System, and is part of the National Highway System, a network of highways that are considered essential to the country's economy, defense, and mobility by the Federal Highway Administration. I-605 is designated as the San Gabriel River Freeway, as named by Senate Bill 99, Chapter 1101 in 1967, and amended to section 619 of the California Streets and Highways Code.

== History ==
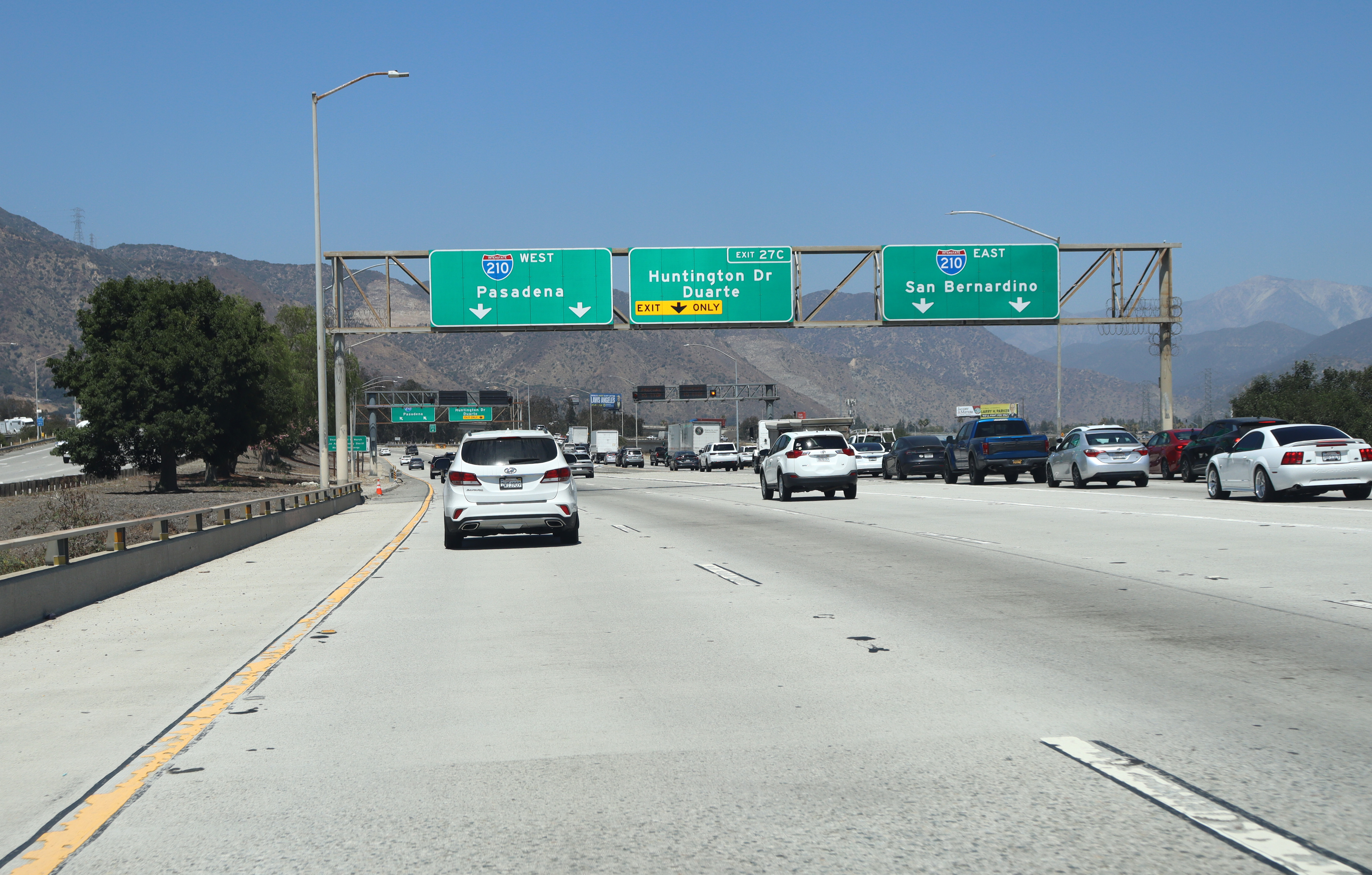
The northern end of I-605 at I-210 in Irwindale

In 1957, the number for this route was proposed as I-13, as it is positioned approximately midway between I-5 and I-15 (although it intersects the former). That number was rejected, as was the second proposed number, I-102. Finally, the designation I-605 was accepted in 1958.

I-605 began construction in 1963 and the first section was opened in 1964 from I-405 to SR 60. The newest section (extension to I-210) was opened in 1971 was originally signed as SR 243. There are plans to extend it to SR 1 further south in Orange County as SR 605, but strong community opposition means that it is unlikely that the alignment will ever be built.

In 2020, there was a proposal to widen I-605, which would have added four new lanes to 12 mi (19 km) of I-605 between Norwalk and El Monte, California. This proposal was rejected due to strong community opposition, in particular due to the fact that it would have led to the destruction of houses in Downey, California.

== Exit list ==
County	Location	mi	km	Exit	Destinations	Notes
Orange	Seal Beach	0.00	0.00	1A	SR 22 west (7th Street) – Long Beach	Southern terminus; SR 22 east exit 2; I-405 north exit 24; I-405 south/SR 22 east is former SR 7 south
Orange	Seal Beach–Los Alamitos line	0.41	0.66	1B	I-405 south (San Diego Freeway) / SR 22 east (Garden Grove Freeway) – Garden Grove	Southern terminus; SR 22 east exit 2; I-405 north exit 24; I-405 south/SR 22 east is former SR 7 south
Orange	Seal Beach–Los Alamitos line	0.41	0.66	—	405 Express Lanes south to SR 22 east	Southern terminus; SR 22 east exit 2; I-405 north exit 24; I-405 south/SR 22 east is former SR 7 south
Orange–Los Angeles county line	Seal Beach–Los Alamitos– Long Beach tripoint	0.41	0.66	1C	I-405 north (San Diego Freeway) – Santa Monica	Signed as exit 1A northbound; former SR 7 north; I-405 south exit 24A
Orange	Los Alamitos	1.41	2.27	1D	Katella Avenue / Willow Street	Signed as exit 1B northbound; southbound access to Willow Street is via exit 2A
Coyote Creek		1.60	2.57	Bridge		
Los Angeles	Long Beach	1.69	2.72	2A	Willow Street	Southbound exit only
Los Angeles	Long Beach	1.93	3.11	2B	Spring Street / Cerritos Avenue	Southbound exit and northbound entrance
Los Angeles	Long Beach–Lakewood line	3.38	5.44	3	Carson Street / Lincoln Avenue	Former US 91 and SR 18
Los Angeles	Lakewood–Cerritos line	4.51	7.26	5A	Del Amo Boulevard	
Los Angeles	Cerritos	5.39	8.67	5B	South Street	
Los Angeles	Cerritos	6.69	10.77	7A	SR 91 (Artesia Freeway)	SR 91 east exit 17, west exit 17B
Los Angeles	Cerritos–Norwalk line	7.45	11.99	7B	Alondra Boulevard	
Los Angeles	Norwalk	8.50	13.68	9A	Rosecrans Avenue	
Los Angeles	Norwalk	9.29	14.95	9B	I-105 west (Century Freeway) / Imperial Highway	Signed as exits 9B (I-105) and 9C (Imperial Highway) northbound; I-105 east exits 18A-B; Imperial Highway is former SR 90; eastern terminus of I-105 (for non-HOV traffic)
Los Angeles	Norwalk	9.53	15.34	10	Firestone Boulevard	Former SR 42
Los Angeles	Downey	11.25	18.11	11	Florence Avenue	
Los Angeles	Downey–Santa Fe Springs line	11.25	18.11	11	I-5 (Santa Ana Freeway) – Los Angeles, Santa Ana	Former US 101 Byp. south; I-5 exit 124
Los Angeles	Santa Fe Springs	11.89	19.14	12	Telegraph Road	Former US 101 Byp. north; former SR 26
Los Angeles	West Whittier-Los Nietos	13.18	21.21	13	Slauson Avenue	
Los Angeles	West Whittier-Los Nietos	13.69	22.03	14	Washington Boulevard	Signed as exits 14A (west) and 14B (east) southbound
Los Angeles	West Whittier-Los Nietos–Whittier line	15.21	24.48	15	Whittier Boulevard (SR 72)	Former US 101
Los Angeles	Whittier–Pico Rivera line	16.05	25.83	16	Beverly Boulevard	Southbound access to Beverly Boulevard west is via exit 17
Los Angeles	Pico Rivera–Industry line	17.21	27.70	17	Rose Hills Road	
Los Angeles	Industry	18.29	29.43	18	Peck Road	
Los Angeles	Industry	19.05	30.66	19	SR 60 (Pomona Freeway) – Los Angeles, Pomona	SR 60 exit 12
Los Angeles	Avocado Heights–Industry line	21.03	33.84	21	Valley Boulevard	Former US 60 and SR 212
Los Angeles	Baldwin Park	21.83	35.13	22	I-10 (San Bernardino Freeway) – Los Angeles, San Bernardino	Former US 99 / US 70 / US 60; I-10 east exits 31A-B, west exit 31A
Los Angeles	Baldwin Park–Irwindale line	22.71	36.55	23	Ramona Boulevard – Baldwin Park, El Monte	Former US 99
Los Angeles	Irwindale	23.79	38.29	24	Lower Azusa Road / Los Angeles Street	
Los Angeles	Irwindale	25.16	40.49	25	Live Oak Avenue	Northbound exit and southbound entrance
Los Angeles	Irwindale	26.60	42.81	26	Arrow Highway	Southbound exit and northbound entrance
Los Angeles	Irwindale	27.40	44.10	27A	I-210 east (Foothill Freeway) – San Bernardino	I-210 exits 36A-B (exit 36B signed as Mount Olive Drive)
Los Angeles	Irwindale	27.40	44.10	27B	I-210 west (Foothill Freeway) – Pasadena	I-210 exits 36A-B (exit 36B signed as Mount Olive Drive)
Los Angeles	Irwindale–Duarte line	27.54	44.32	27C	Huntington Drive (Historic US 66) – Duarte	Northern terminus; at-grade intersection; former US 66
	Irwindale–Duarte line	27.54	44.32		Mount Olive Drive	Continuation beyond Huntington Drive
1.000 mi = 1.609 km; 1.000 km = 0.621 mi: Electronic toll collection; Incomplete access
