= California State Route 72 =

State highway in California

State Route 72
- Whittier Boulevard
- SR 72 highlighted in red; the gap represents the relinquished portion

Route information
- Maintained by Caltrans
- Length: 0.72 mi (1,160 m) Portions of SR 72 have been relinquished to or are otherwise maintained by local or other governments, and are not included in the length.

Major junctions
- South end: SR 39 in La Habra
- CR N8 in Whittier
- North end: I-605 in Whittier

Location
- Country: United States
- State: California
- Counties: Orange, Los Angeles

Highway system
- State highways in California; Interstate; US; State; Scenic; History; Pre‑1964; Unconstructed; Deleted; Freeways
| ← SR 71 | → SR 73 |

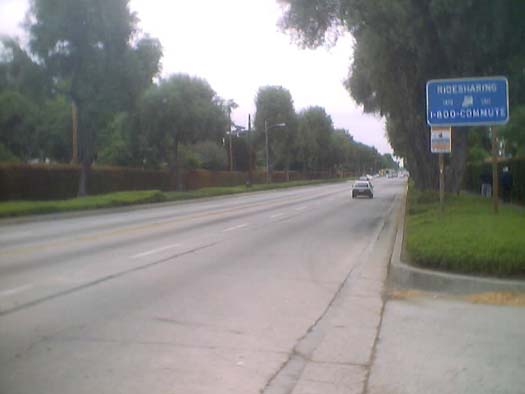
Former eastbound SR 72 on Whittier Boulevard, entering Whittier.

State Route 72 (SR 72) is a state highway in the U.S. state of California. It forms part of El Camino Real in the Los Angeles area. Since 2025, the route consists of two short segments of Whittier Boulevard. The first segment begins at SR 39 (Beach Boulevard) and runs west to Valley Home Avenue on the Orange and Los Angeles county line in La Habra. The second segment begins at Lockheed Avenue and runs northwest to Interstate 605 in Whittier. Though some maps mark SR 72 as continuous through Whittier, control of most of the route within the city was relinquished to that local jurisdiction and is thus no longer officially part of the state highway system.

== Route description ==
Route 72 is defined in section 372 of the California Streets and Highways Code, last amended by the California State Legislature in 2020, and that the highway is "from Route 39 to Route 605 in Whittier". Subdivision (a) of section 372 also states that Route 72 will be deleted from the state highway system upon completed construction of Route 90, also known as the Slauson Freeway, from Route 5 to Route 39, but Caltrans has abandoned all plans to finish the freeway. Subdivision (b) states that control of the relinquished former northwestern segment of Route 72 through Montebello and Pico Rivera is no longer officially part of the state highway system, but those cities must still "maintain within their respective jurisdictions signs directing motorists to the continuation of Route 72". Subdivision (c) also permit the state to also relinquish control of the portion of Route 72 located in Whittier and unincorporated Los Angeles County.

The relinquishment in Whittier and unincorporated Los Angeles County was approved in 2025. Prior to, Route 72 officially began at the junction of I-605 in Whittier. The route followed Whittier Boulevard for its entire length, heading southeast through Whittier as a four-lane arterial street. SR 72 crossed with Los Angeles County Route N8 at Colima Road and ended at the intersection of SR 39 (Beach Boulevard) in La Habra. Whittier Boulevard is a major commercial corridor in Whittier, though it does not go through the city center, which is north of the highway. Now with the 2025 relinquishment, Route 72 officially consists of two short segments along Whittier Boulevard: between SR 39 and Valley Home Avenue, and Lockheed Avenue and I-605.

SR 72 however is still defined in the state highway code as a north–south state route. This reflects the original alignment and length of SR 72 before the highway was shortened over the years. From I-605, SR 72 then formerly continued west under a railroad bridge near Pío Pico State Historic Park and then over the San Gabriel River as it entered Pico Rivera and met SR 19 at Rosemead Boulevard. After about a mile and a half, the route crossed a narrow steel bridge over the Rio Hondo into Montebello. There, it continued towards Atlantic Boulevard. From there, it continued further to its end at Downey Road. Whittier Boulevard itself continues past Downey Road towards downtown Los Angeles. Those segments were relinquished back to the cities of Pico Rivera and Montebello by 2010, and are not included in the length of SR 72. And prior to 1981, SR 72 extended further east along Whittier Boulevard to Harbor Boulevard, where it then turned south to meet with I-5 in Anaheim.

SR 72 is part of the National Highway System, a network of highways that are considered essential to the country's economy, defense, and mobility by the Federal Highway Administration.

== History ==
California's historic El Camino Real, which connected the Alta California missions, ran along what was then U.S. Route 101. Before 1964, U.S. Route 101 continued past today's end near the East Los Angeles Interchange east onto Whittier Boulevard and south on Harbor Boulevard until it met its bypass in Anaheim. (What is now Route 5 from Los Angeles to Anaheim was the U.S. Route 101 Bypass.)

In 1964, the U.S. Route 101 designation was removed south of the East L.A. Interchange. Its routing on Whittier and Harbor Boulevards became Route 72 and was initially defined to run from Route 5 (the former bypass) to an unbuilt State Route 245, hence the route's lackluster end at Downey Road. (Route 245 was to have been a bypass connecting Route 5 with Route 60, a function that was eventually assumed by an extended Route 710.)

In 1965, with Route 245 deleted, the definition was clarified to have Route 72 end at Downey Road, which was parallel to the planned Route 245.

In 1981, the portion from Route 5 to Harbor Boulevard (current SR 39) was deleted, and the portion from Harbor Boulevard to Route 39 was transferred to SR 39.

In 1992, the portion from Atlantic Boulevard to Downey Road was deleted.

In 2010, SB-1318 Sec. 20 deleted the segment between I-605 and Atlantic Boulevard. It also states that Route 72 will be deleted when "Route 90 freeway is completed from Route 5 to Route 39."

Cal. S&HC § 635(b) includes unspecified parts of Route 72 in El Camino Real.

On May 15, 2025, the California Transportation Commission (CTC) approved a deal between the California Department of Transportation (Caltrans) and the city Whittier, for Caltrans to relinquish the segment of SR 72 between Lockheed Avenue and Valley Home Avenue to the city.

== Major intersections ==
Except where prefixed with a letter, postmiles were measured on the road as it was in 1964, based on the alignment that existed at the time, and do not necessarily reflect current mileage. Postmile prefixes include: R reflecting a realignment in the route since then, M indicating a second realignment, L referring to an overlap due to a correction or change, and T indicating postmiles classified as temporary. Segments that remain unconstructed or have been relinquished to local control may be omitted. The numbers reset at county lines; the start and end postmiles in each county are given in the county column.

| County | Location | Postmile | Destinations | Notes |
|---|---|---|---|---|
| Orange; ORA 11.42-11.92 | La Habra | 11.42 | SR 39 south (Beach Boulevard) – Buena Park, Huntington Beach | Southern terminus; Whittier Boulevard continues east as SR 39 north |
| Orange–Los Angeles county line | La Habra–Whittier line | 11.92 0.00 | Valley Home Avenue | Northern end of state maintenance (Note: The state has relinquished, and turned over various segments of the highway to local control.) |
| Los Angeles; LA 0.00-6.66 | Whittier | 1.80 | CR N8 (Colima Road) | |
| Los Angeles; LA 0.00-6.66 | Whittier | 4.2 | Washington Boulevard | Eastern terminus of Washington Boulevard |
| Los Angeles; LA 0.00-6.66 | Whittier | 6.54 | Lockheed Avenue | Southern end of state maintenance |
| Los Angeles; LA 0.00-6.66 | Whittier | 6.66 | I-605 (San Gabriel River Freeway) | I-605 exit 15; northern terminus; Whittier Boulevard continues west beyond I-605 |
1.000 mi = 1.609 km; 1.000 km = 0.621 mi
