= Atlantic Boulevard (Los Angeles County) =

Street in Los Angeles County, California, USA

Atlantic Boulevard / Atlantic Avenue / Los Robles Avenue
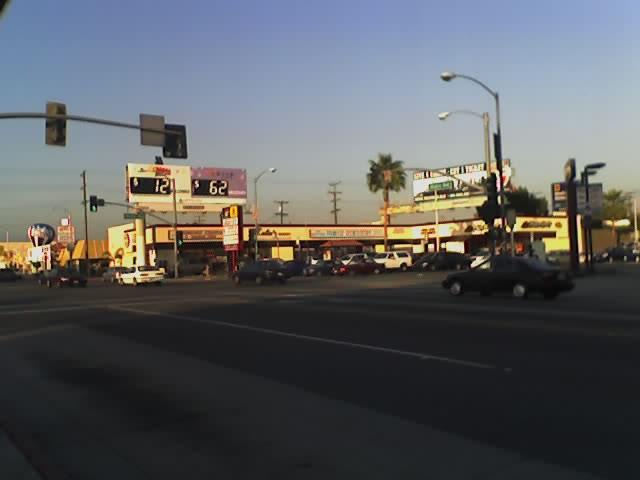
- Atlantic and Whittier Boulevard intersection in East Los Angeles.
- Interactive map of Atlantic Boulevard / Atlantic Avenue / Los Robles Avenue
- Length: 30.3 mi (48.8 km)
- Nearest metro station: Atlantic
- South end: Ocean Boulevard in Long Beach
- Major junctions: I-405 in Long Beach; SR 91 in Long Beach; I-710 in Long Beach; I-710 in Vernon; I-5 in Commerce; SR 60 in Monterey Park; I-10 in Alhambra
- North end: Woodbury Road in Pasadena

Atlantic Boulevard is a major north–south thoroughfare in eastern Los Angeles County, California. Extending north from Long Beach to Pasadena, the route is also designated as Atlantic Avenue between Long Beach and the Bell–Maywood line, and Los Robles Avenue between Alhambra and Pasadena. The street also passes through the cities and communities of Compton, Lynwood, South Gate, Cudahy, Vernon, Commerce, Eastside Los Angeles, East Los Angeles, and Monterey Park.

== Route description ==
The street begins as Atlantic Avenue at Ocean Boulevard in Downtown Long Beach. It then heads north parallel to the Long Beach Freeway and the Los Angeles River to Randolph Street roughly at the Bell–Maywood border, where it becomes Atlantic Boulevard. It then heads further north to Huntington Drive in northern Alhambra, where it becomes Los Robles Avenue. The street then ends at Woodbury Road in Pasadena.

=== Highway crossings ===
Atlantic crosses and has access to State Route 1 (Pacific Coast Highway), Interstate 405 (San Diego Freeway), and State Route 91 (Gardena Freeway) in Long Beach; Interstate 710 (Long Beach Freeway) in Vernon; Interstate 5 (Santa Ana Freeway) in Commerce; State Route 60 (Pomona Freeway) in Monterey Park; and Interstate 10 (San Bernardino Freeway) in Alhambra.

It also passes underneath Interstate 710 in Compton and Interstate 105 (Century Freeway) in Lynwood without interchanges.

== Public transportation ==
=== Bus ===
Bus service along Atlantic Boulevard/Avenue between Huntington Drive and Artesia Boulevard is provided by Metro Local line 260. Bus service south of Artesia Boulevard is provided by Long Beach Transit line 61.

=== Light rail ===
The Los Angeles Metro Rail's Atlantic station is located at the intersection of Atlantic Boulevard and Pomona Boulevard in East Los Angeles. It is the current eastern terminus of the E Line. It connects the East Los Angeles community to Downtown Los Angeles, Santa Monica, and other Metro Rail lines.

== See also ==
- Streets in Los Angeles County, California
