= Whittier Boulevard =

Street in Los Angeles County

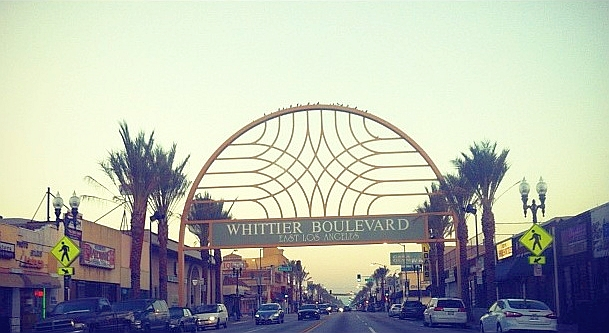
- The El Arco arch sign on Whittier Blvd in East Los Angeles; seen in June 2013.
- Part of: SR 72 between I-605 and Whittier and Beach Boulevard in La Habra; SR 39 between Beach and Harbor Boulevards in La Habra
- Maintained by: Caltrans and local jurisdictions
- Length: 20.0 mi (32.2 km)
- West end: 6th Street at the Los Angeles River
- Major junctions: US 101 in Los Angeles, California; SR 60 in Los Angeles, California; I-605 in Whittier
- East end: Puente Street in Brea

Whittier Boulevard is an arterial street that runs in Los Angeles County, California from the Los Angeles River (where it continues into Downtown Los Angeles as 6th Street) to Brea, California. The street is one of the main thoroughfares in both Whittier and East Los Angeles. At various times, portions of Whittier Boulevard carried the designation of U.S. Route 101. Whittier Boulevard also carries a portion of El Camino Real. Its west section leading from the Sixth Street Viaduct was demolished in 2016; the replacement was officially opened in 2022.

Since 2025, Whittier Boulevard carries the following two Caltrans-controlled state highways. The portions between Interstate 605 and Lockheed Avenue, and Valley Home Avenue and Beach Boulevard officially carries State Route 72. The portion between Beach and Harbor Boulevards carries State Route 39. The State Route 72 designation along Whittier Boulevard was originally longer: the portion of the highway between Downey Road and State Route 19 was deleted in 1992, the segment between State Route 19 and Interstate 605 was relinquished back to Pico Rivera in the early 2000s, and most of the portions between Interstate 605 and Beach Boulevard (except for the aforementioned segments) were relinquished back to Whittier and unincorporated Los Angeles County in 2025.

In Los Angeles, Whittier Boulevard was known as Stephenson Avenue before 1920. The portion in what is now Whittier was known as County Road in Whittier's early days.

== East Los Angeles ==
=== Cuisine of Whittier Boulevard ===
Whittier Boulevard located in The East Los Angeles community consists mainly of Latino descent, but as well as other culture groups, which provides the diversity of East L.A. Whittier Boulevard is the heart of the community in East Los Angeles; it is filled with street vendors, selling hot dogs, fruits, garments, and Mexican food. In particular, taco trucks appear frequently on Whittier Boulevard. Other establishments include liquor stores, bread shops, clothing stores and furniture warehouses, 99 cent stores, as well as a supermarket, but with the change in times, places are being shut down and remodeled or new shops pop up frequently. The tacos are not the only thing popular along these strips, but the occasional, but a more growing popular snack rising is the Hot Dog created on the streets of Whittier. Hot dogs served along Whittier are wrapped in bacon and served with grilled onions and jalapeños. When prepared this way, it is known as an East L.A. Ditch Dog. Both hot dogs and tacos can be served with nieves (Mexican slushy), and esquites (corn kernels smothered in mayo, Mexican cheese, and butter, with the option of chili or other condiments).

=== Latino Walk of Fame ===
The Latino Walk of Fame, with a focus on Latino celebrities, was inaugurated on April 30, 1997, to honor outstanding leaders who have made historical and social contributions with a sun plaque on Whittier Boulevard the heart of unincorporated East L.A. spaces have been created for over 280 plaques. Permanent granite plaques have been put in place for the first 20 honorees. The merchants’ association of East Los Angeles sponsors a comprehensive clean-up campaign that cleans the sidewalks and gutters daily and removes litter and trash.

=== Lowriding ===
One trend is the usage and showings of lowriders. It has been said that East Los Angeles, specifically on Whittier Boulevard was one of the few first places that low riders began to appear around World War II. Drivers compete against each other and hope to win the other driver's car, known as "hopping for pink slips.” The street became very popular as a place for low riders to come together. Lowriders want to showcase them and come together at parks, parking lots, etc. anywhere they find place and come in groups. In 1965, on weekend nights in East Los Angeles, Mexican-American teenagers would hop in their cars to cruise up and down Whittier Boulevard.

The 1984, Frank Romero's oil on canvas entitled The Closing Of Whittier Boulevard, 96” x 144” painting documents the real event that happened in the 1970s when the police closed off Whittier Boulevard to all the low riders who regularly cruised it.

=== Zoot Suit Riots ===
During World War II, Whittier Boulevard and neighboring East LA streets went through the neighborhoods of many Pachucos. A few Zoot Suits fights happened in East Los Angeles' streets like Whittier Boulevard. When the Zoot Suit Riots occurred in Los Angeles it was difficult to be a Latino in that area (especially around Whittier Boulevard), especially for those who wore a Zoot Suit.

== Recreation and other sites ==
Along the Whittier Boulevard strip is Salazar Park, named after Ruben Salazar. Salazar died as a result of injuries sustained after he was struck by a tear-gas projectile during the National Chicano Moratorium March against the Vietnam War on August 29, 1970, in East Los Angeles, California. The park hosts baseball games, senior activities in a gym, offers a public swimming pool in the summer and classes for non-swimmers, allowing community members to have recreational activities. The Spanish Churrigueresque-style theatre was designed by William and Clifford Balch, who also participated in the design of the El Rey Theatre on Wilshire Boulevard and the Fox Theatre in Pomona. The Vega Building, a historic retail building that once surrounded the theatre, suffered severe damage from the 1987 Whittier Narrows earthquake and was demolished in the early 1990s. The theatre sat vacant until it was adapted for use as a CVS retail pharmacy in 2012.

== Events ==
Every year there is a Christmas parade, called the East Los Angeles Parade. It takes place along Whittier Boulevard starting on Eastern Avenue and ending at Atlantic Boulevard. This parade usually consists of elementary school, middle school and high school cheer squads. They occasionally bring in elephants, television reporters, local broadcasters to cover the parades and sometimes some television celebrities. In 2008, they brought in Jose Jose, a famous Mexican singer.

== In popular culture ==
Thee Midniters were a Chicano rock band that became popular in the 1960s. Their song “Whittier Boulevard” gained popularity just as they did. They named their song after the most popular street in East Los Angeles: Whittier Boulevard.

Scenes of Whittier Boulevard appeared in the beginning of Chico and the Man TV show. The show was based on East Los Angeles and showed much of the neighborhood and streets. The 1979 film Boulevard Nights, which concerned gangbanging and lowriding on the streets of East Los Angeles also included scenes of Whittier Boulevard.

In 1993, the boulevard was featured in Visiting... with Huell Howser Episode 107.

The play, Whittier Boulevard was written and performed by the Latino Theater Company in 2023. It jumps to the near future to look back at the Latino history of L.A.

== Transportation ==
Bus service on Whittier Boulevard is provided by Metro Local line 18 and Montebello Transit Line 10. Metro Line 18 runs on Whittier Boulevard between Downtown and East Los Angeles, and Montebello Line 10 runs east of East Los Angeles.
