= California State Route 7 (1934–1964) =

Former highway in California

State Route 7

Route information
- Maintained by Caltrans
- Existed: 1934–1964

Major junctions
- South end: Palos Verdes
- North end: Oregon state line

Location
- Country: United States
- State: California
- Counties: Los Angeles, Kern, Inyo, Mono; Sierra, Lassen, Modoc

Highway system
- State highways in California; Interstate; US; State; Scenic; History; Pre‑1964; Unconstructed; Deleted; Freeways

State Route 7 was a state highway that existed from 1934 to 1964.

The route was originally one of the longest in the California State Highway system, running from the Oregon border at New Pine Creek to Palos Verdes. It followed present-day U.S. Highway 395 north of Inyokern, Sierra Highway (portions of which are still California State Route 14) between Inyokern and Acton, Soledad Canyon Road into Santa Clarita, then along San Fernando Road, Foothill Boulevard, Maclay Street, Brand Boulevard, Sepulveda Boulevard, Centinela Avenue, La Brea Avenue and Hawthorne Boulevard in the Los Angeles area. It was truncated north of Newhall Pass when portions of it were renumbered as U.S. Highway 395 and U.S. Route 6, and the remainder of the route was realigned along Sepulveda Boulevard between San Fernando Road and a terminus at U.S. 101 Alternate (Lincoln Boulevard, present-day California State Route 1) in Westchester.

In 1961, the remaining segment was rerouted along a new freeway alignment. During the 1964 renumbering, the freeway segment was renumbered to Interstate 405. State Route 7 has since been assigned to two other highways: the Long Beach Freeway (present-day Interstate 710) and the current route in Imperial County.
