= Verani (surname) =

Verani is an Italian surname and the plural form of Verano. Notable people with the surname include:

- Dario Verani (born 1995), Italian competitive open water swimmer
- Pablo Verani (1938–2013), Argentine politician

== See also ==
- Anthony Veranis (1938–1966), American boxer
