= Veran =

Veran may refer to:

- Veran (The Legend of Zelda), the antagonist in the video game The Legend of Zelda: Oracle of Ages
- Veran Matić (born 1962), the Chief Executive Officer of B92

Véran may refer to:

- Veranus of Cavaillon, a French saint
- Saint-Véran, a commune in the Hautes-Alpes department in southeastern France
- 48159 Saint-Véran, a main belt asteroid
- Olivier Véran, a French politician

== See also ==
- Verano (disambiguation)
