= Orange County, California =

County in California, United States

Orange County
- County
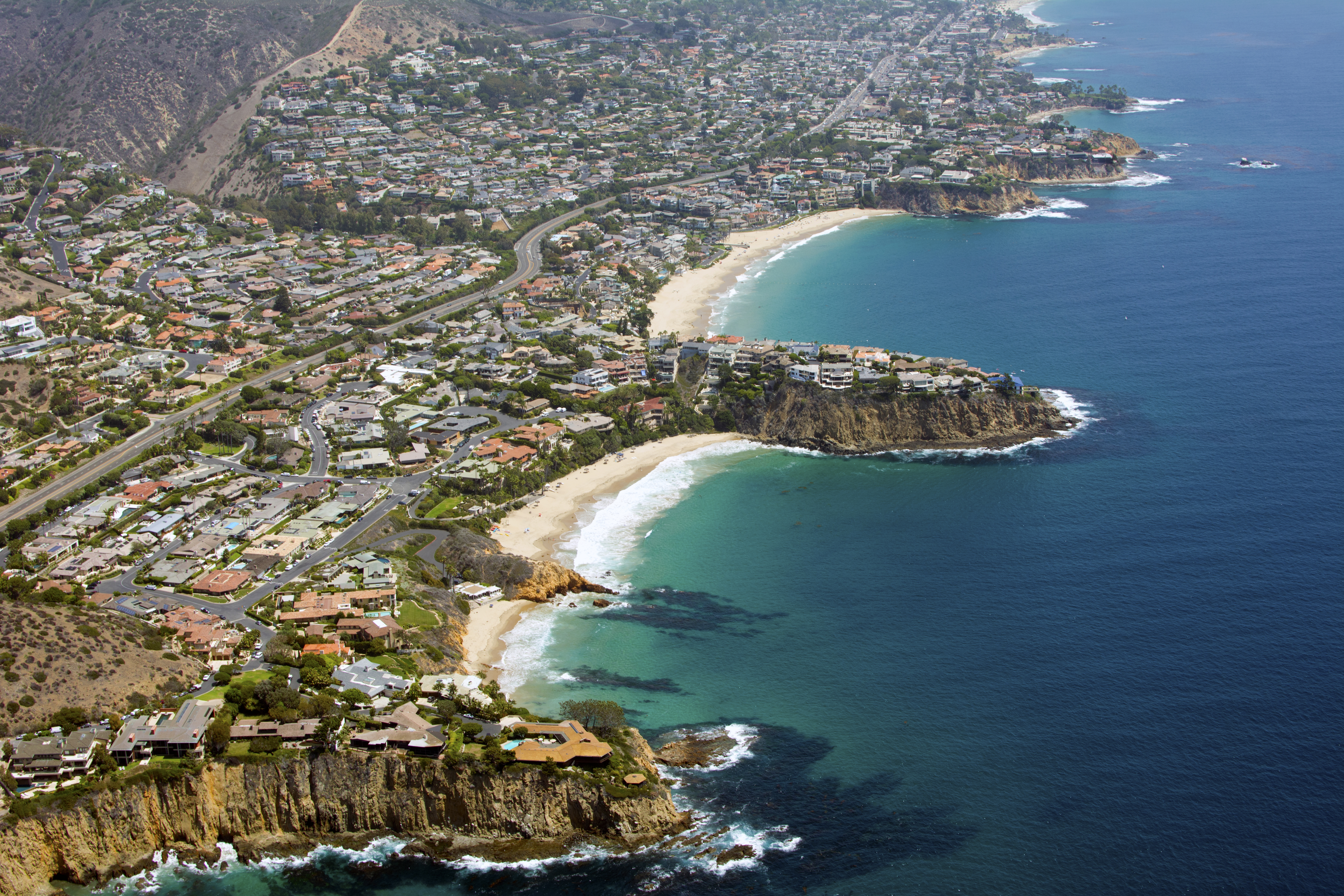
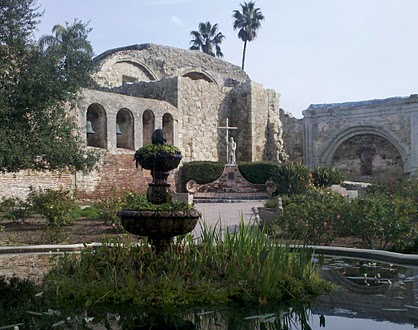
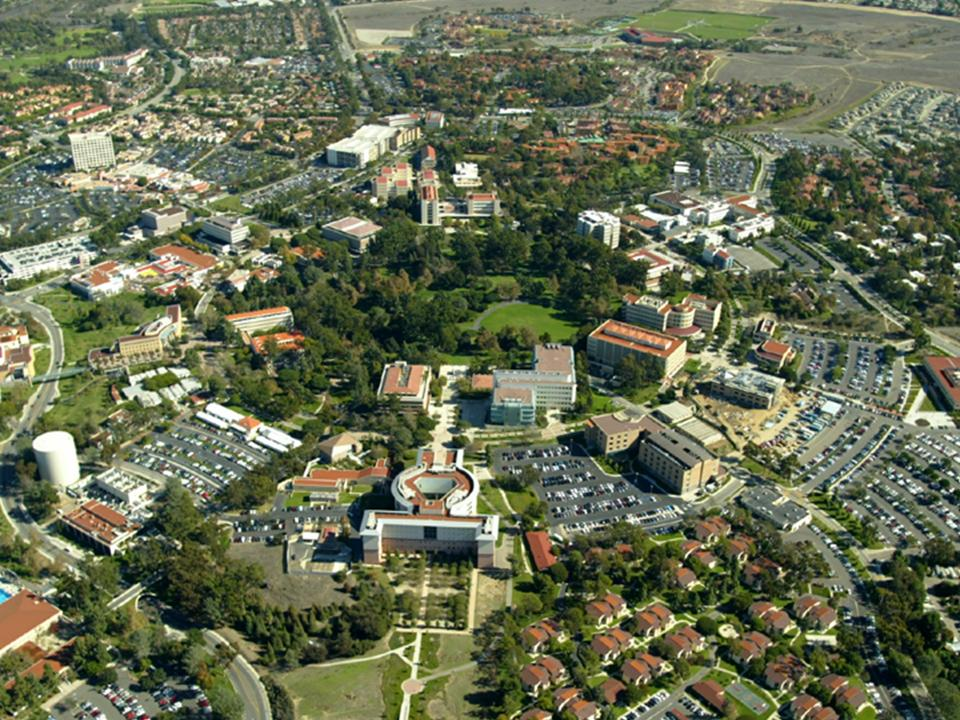
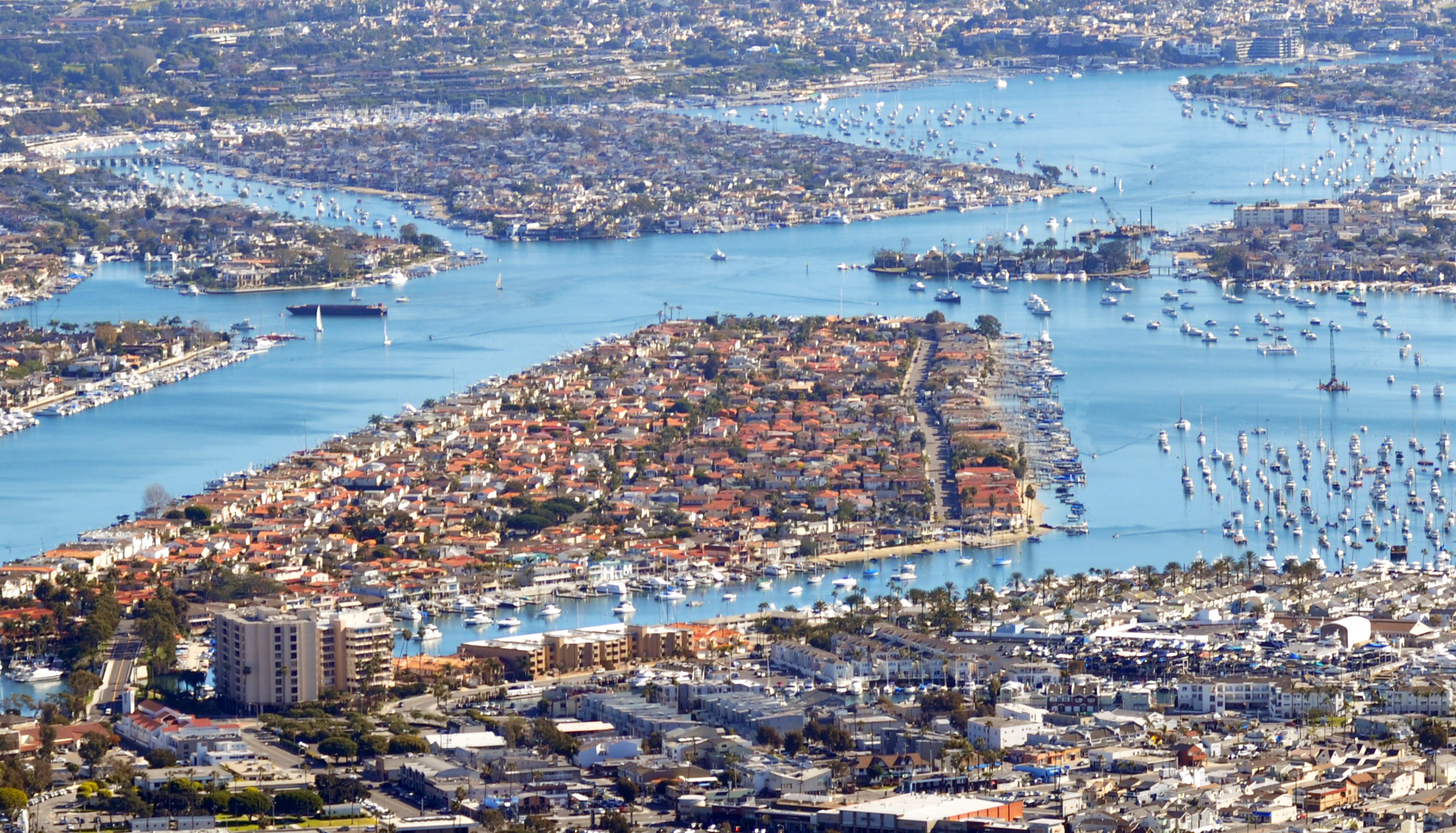
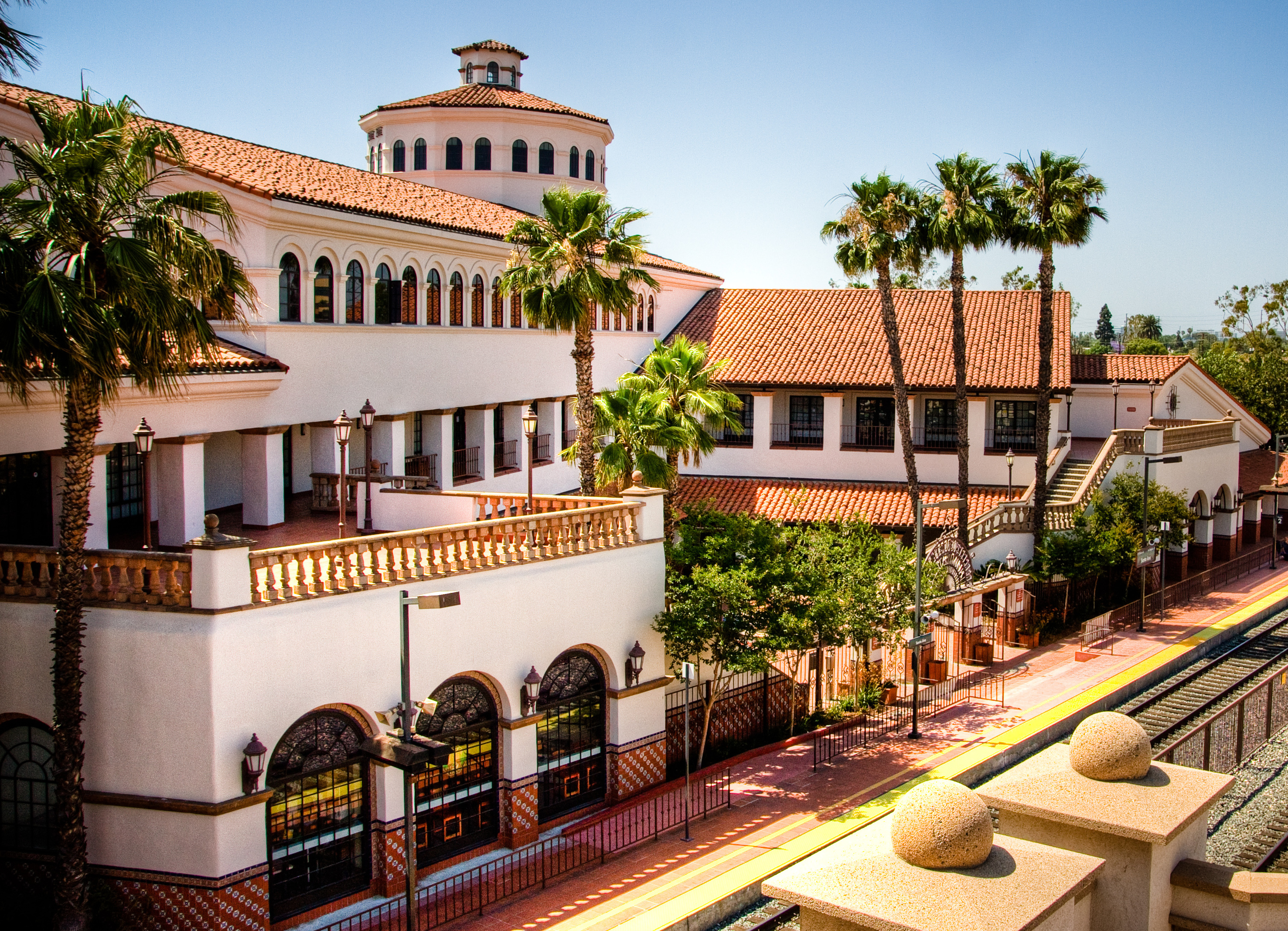
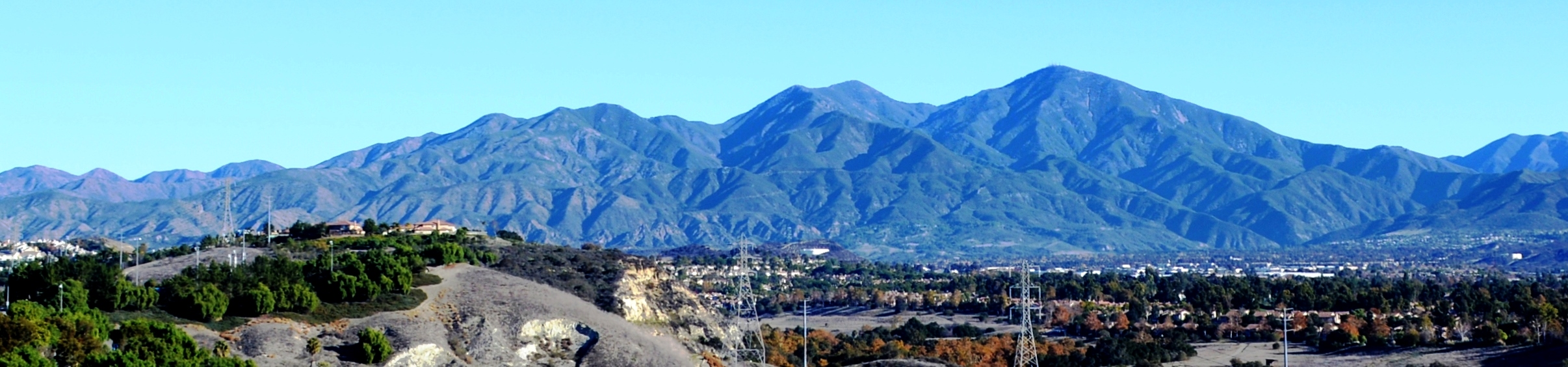
- Laguna Beach on the Orange Coast San Juan Capistrano Irvine Balboa Island Santa Ana Santa Ana Mountains seen from Mission Viejo

- Flag Seal
- Interactive map of Orange County
- Location in California
- Coordinates: 33.67°N 117.78°W
- Country: United States
- State: California
- Region: Greater Los Angeles & South Coast
- Incorporated: August 1, 1889
- Named for: The orange (fruit), named so the county would sound like a semi-tropical, mediterranean region to people from the East Coast
- County seat: Santa Ana
- Largest city: Anaheim (population); Irvine (area)

Government
  - Type: Council–CEO
  - Body: Board of Supervisors: Janet Nguyen (R); Vicente Sarmiento (D); Donald P. Wagner (R); Doug Chaffee (D); Katrina Foley (D)
  - Chair: Doug Chaffee (D)
  - Vice Chair: Katrina Foley (D)
  - County Executive Officer: Michelle Aguirre

Area
  - Total: 948 sq mi (2,460 km^{2})
  - Land: 799 sq mi (2,070 km^{2})
  - Water: 157 sq mi (410 km^{2})
- Highest elevation: 5,689 ft (1,734 m)

Population (2020)
  - Total: 3,186,989
  - Estimate (2025): 3,149,507 ▼
  - Density: 3,989/sq mi (1,540/km^{2})
- Demonym: Orange Countian

GDP
  - Total: $351.753 billion (2024)
- Time zone: UTC−8 (Pacific Time Zone)
  - Summer (DST): UTC−7 (Pacific Daylight Time)
- Area codes: 562, 657/714, 949
- Congressional districts: 38th, 40th, 45th, 46th, 47th, 49th
- Website: ocgov.com

Orange County, officially the County of Orange and often initialized O.C., is located in the Greater Los Angeles area in Southern California, United States. As of the 2020 United States census, the population was 3,186,989, making it the third most populous county in California, the sixth most populous in the United States, and more populous than 19 U.S. states and Washington, D.C. Although mostly suburban, it is the second most densely populated county in the state behind San Francisco County. The county's three most populous cities are Anaheim, Santa Ana and Irvine, each of which has a population surpassing 300,000. Santa Ana is also the county seat. Six cities in Orange County lie along the Pacific Coast: Seal Beach, Huntington Beach, Newport Beach, Laguna Beach, Dana Point and San Clemente.

Orange County is included in the Los Angeles–Long Beach–Anaheim Metropolitan Statistical Area. The county has 34 incorporated cities. Older cities such as Tustin, Santa Ana, Anaheim, Orange and Fullerton have traditional downtowns dating back to the 19th century, while newer commercial development or "edge cities" stretch along the Interstate 5 (Santa Ana) Freeway between Disneyland and Santa Ana and between South Coast Plaza and the Irvine Business Complex and cluster at Irvine Spectrum.

The county is a tourist center, with attractions such as Disneyland Resort, Knott's Berry Farm, Mission San Juan Capistrano, Huntington Beach Pier, the Richard Nixon Presidential Library and Museum, Orange County Zoo, Modjeska House, Segerstrom Center for the Arts, Yost Theater, Bowers Museum, Balboa Island, Angel Stadium, Downtown Santa Ana, Crystal Cove Historic District, Honda Center, the Old Orange County Courthouse, Orange County Fair, the Irvine Ranch Natural Landmarks, Heritage Hills Historic Park, Ocean Institute and several popular beaches along its more than 40 mi (64 km) of coastline. It is also home to a major research university, the University of California, Irvine (UCI), along with a number of other notable colleges and universities such as Chapman University and Cal State Fullerton.

== History ==
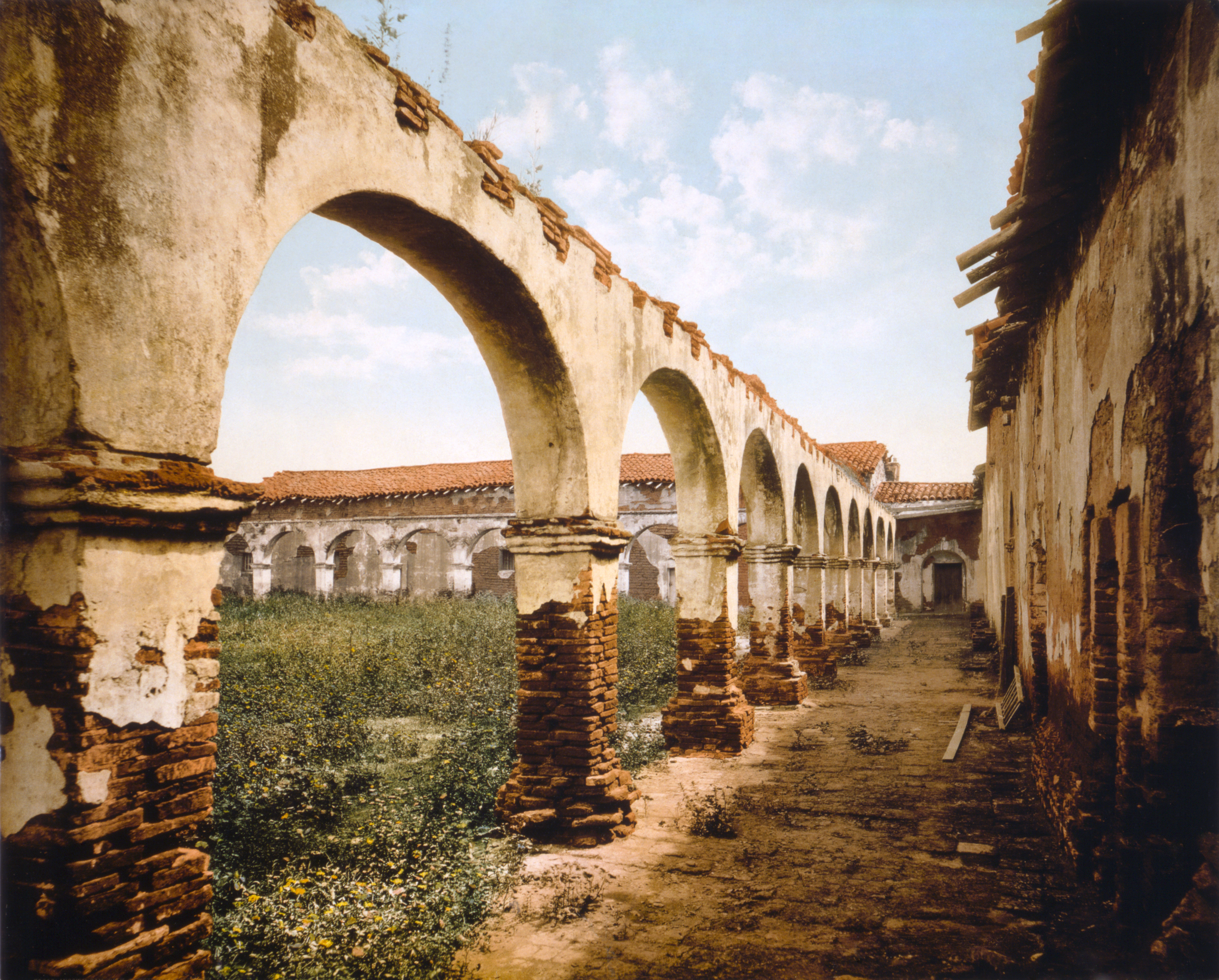
Mission San Juan Capistrano, photochrom print by William Henry Jackson c. 1899

The history of Orange County, California, spans thousands of years, beginning with Acjachemen indigenous peoples who lived off the land through hunting, fishing, and gathering. Later, Shoshonean-speaking tribes, including the Juaneño and Gabrielino, settled in the area. Spanish colonization began in 1769 with expeditions and the establishment of missions like Mission San Juan Capistrano. Under Spanish and later Mexican rule, large land grants formed ranchos, which dominated the economy through cattle ranching.

One of the first land grants in Orange County under Spanish Rule was Rancho Santiago de Santa Ana which was given to José Antonio Yorba and Juan Pablo Peralta (nephew) in 1810, the year of the commencement of the war of Mexican Independence.

After California became part of the United States in 1850, the Gold Rush spurred demand for beef, boosting the local economy. However, environmental challenges and legal disputes over land ownership led many rancheros to sell their lands, often to American settlers. The first American-founded town, Anaheim, was established in 1857 by German immigrants. Other towns like Santa Ana and Orange soon followed, supported by agriculture and improved irrigation.

The arrival of railroads in the 1870s and a real estate boom in the 1880s fueled rapid growth. In 1889, Orange County officially separated from Los Angeles County, with Santa Ana as its seat. Agriculture, especially citrus, dominated until the mid-20th century, alongside oil discoveries and transportation developments like highways and railways.

World War II brought military bases and postwar population growth. By the 1950s, suburban development replaced farmland, and cities rapidly incorporated. The Disneyland Resort 1955 opening marked the rise of tourism.

In 1994, Robert Citron was serving as Treasurer-Tax Collector and chose leveraging strategies with county investments that ended in Chapter 9 bankruptcy for the County, costing 3,000 jobs at the county and $1.64 billion in losses.

== Geography ==
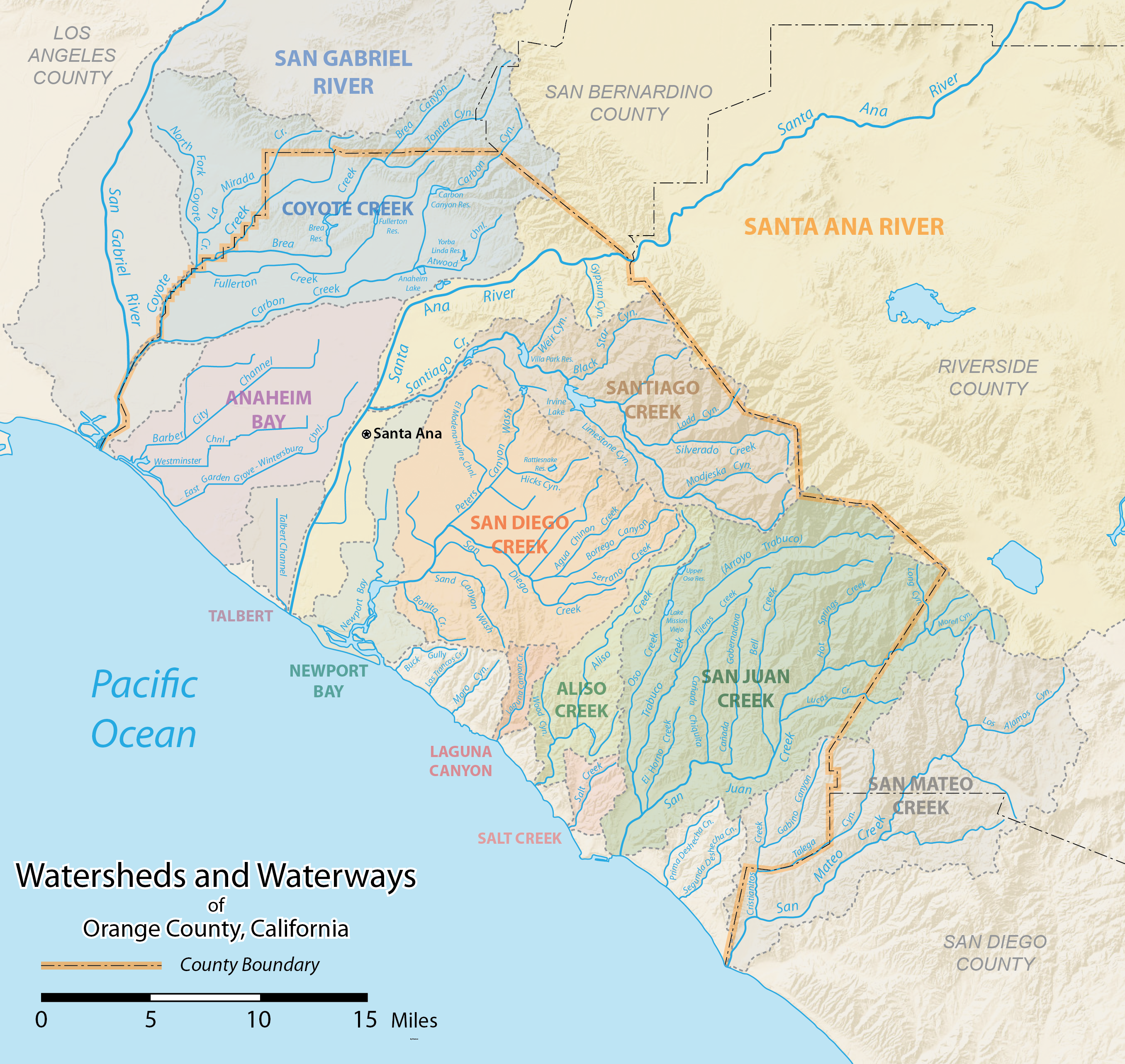
The Orange County watershed

According to the U.S. Census Bureau, the county has a total area of 948 sq mi (2,460 km^{2}), of which 791 sq mi (2,050 km^{2}) is land and 157 sq mi (410 km^{2}) (16.6%) is water. It is the smallest county by area in Southern California, being just over 40% the size of the region's next smallest county, Ventura. The average annual temperature is about 68 °F (20 °C).

Orange County is bordered on the southwest by the Pacific Ocean, on the north by Los Angeles County, on the northeast by San Bernardino County, on the east by Riverside County, and on the southeast by San Diego County.

The northwestern part of the county lies on the coastal plain of the Los Angeles Basin, while the southeastern end rises into the foothills of the Santa Ana Mountains. Most of Orange County's population reside in one of two shallow coastal valleys that lie in the basin, the Santa Ana Valley and the Saddleback Valley. The Santa Ana Mountains lie within the eastern boundaries of the county and of the Cleveland National Forest. The high point is Santiago Peak (5,689 ft (1,734 m)), about 20 mi (32 km) east of Santa Ana. Santiago Peak and nearby Modjeska Peak, just 200 ft (60 m) shorter, form a ridge known as Saddleback, visible from almost everywhere in the county. The Peralta Hills extend westward from the Santa Ana Mountains through the communities of Anaheim Hills, Orange, and ending in Olive. The Loma Ridge is another prominent feature, running parallel to the Santa Ana Mountains through the central part of the county, separated from the taller mountains to the east by Santiago Canyon.

The Santa Ana River is the county's principal watercourse, flowing through the middle of the county from northeast to southwest. Its major tributary to the south and east is Santiago Creek. Other watercourses within the county include Aliso Creek, San Juan Creek, and Horsethief Creek. In the North, the San Gabriel River also briefly crosses into Orange County and exits into the Pacific on the Los Angeles-Orange County line between the cities of Long Beach and Seal Beach. Laguna Beach is home to the county's only natural lakes, Laguna Lakes, which are formed by water rising up against an underground fault.

=== Regions of Orange County ===
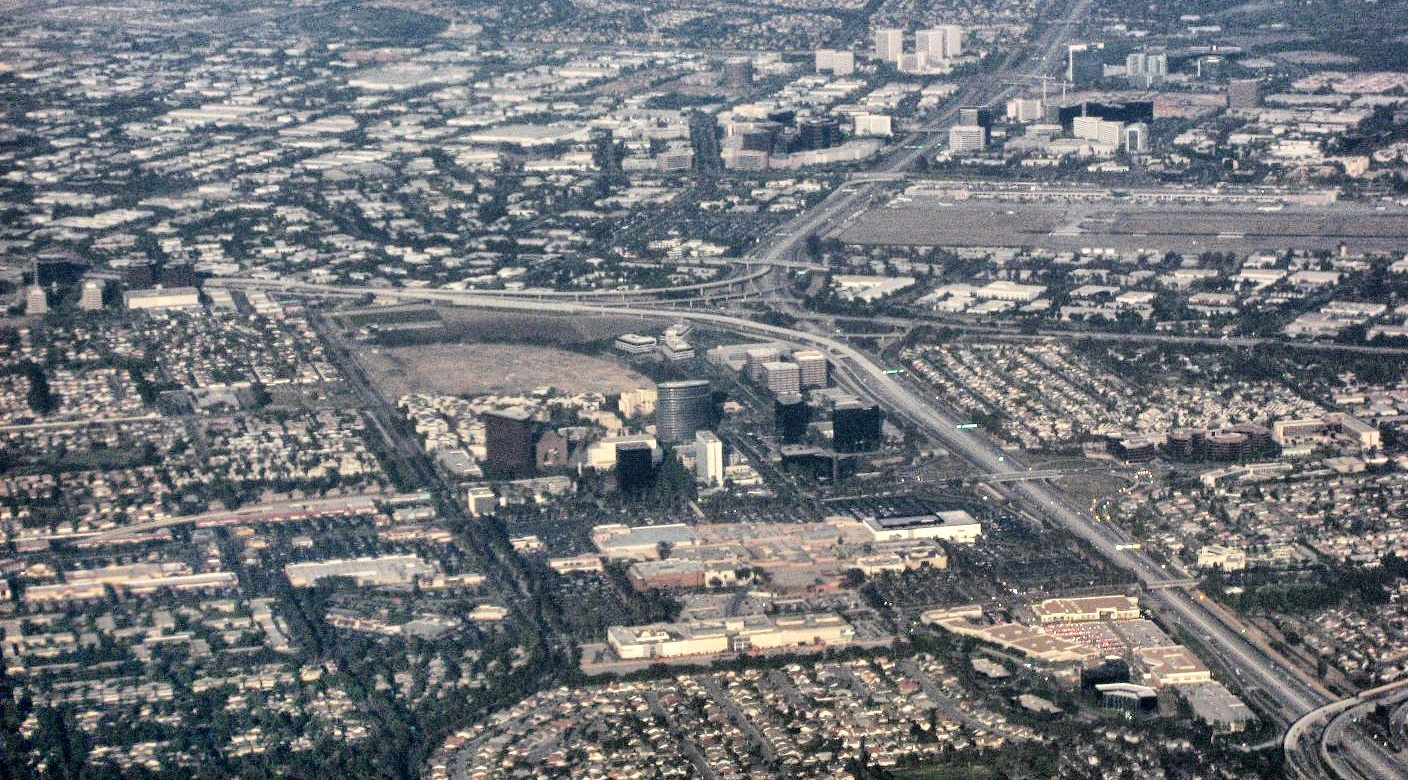
Aerial view of an edge city: Irvine Business Complex (top), John Wayne Airport runway (upper center), South Coast Metro buildings (lower center) and below, the South Coast Plaza mall

Orange County is sometimes divided into northern and southern regions. There are significant political, demographic, economic and cultural distinctions between North and South Orange County. A popular dividing line between the two regions is the Costa Mesa Freeway.

Northern Orange County, including Anaheim, Fullerton, Garden Grove and Santa Ana, was the first part of the county to be developed and is culturally closer to neighboring Los Angeles County. This region is more Hispanic (mostly Mexican) and Asian (predominantly Vietnamese and Korean), more densely populated (Santa Ana is among the most densely populated cities in the United States), younger, less wealthy and with higher unemployment. It has more renters and fewer homeowners and generally votes Democratic. There are notable exceptions to these general trends, such as strongly Republican Yorba Linda and affluent Anaheim Hills, North Tustin, and Villa Park. Northern Orange County is predominantly flat, giving way to the Santa Ana Mountains in the Northeast.

Southern Orange County is wealthier, more residential, more Republican, predominantly non-Hispanic white, and more recently developed. Irvine, the largest city in the region, is an exception to some of these trends, being not only a major employment center, but also a major tech hub and education center with UCI. Furthermore, the city is an Asian plurality (both South and East Asian), and votes reliably Democratic in recent years. Southern Orange County almost always includes Irvine, Newport Beach, and the cities to their southeast, including Lake Forest, Laguna Hills, Laguna Niguel, Laguna Beach, Laguna Woods, Mission Viejo, San Juan Capistrano, Aliso Viejo, and San Clemente.

Another region of Orange County is the Orange Coast, which includes the six cities bordering the Pacific Ocean.

=== Commercial districts and edge cities ===
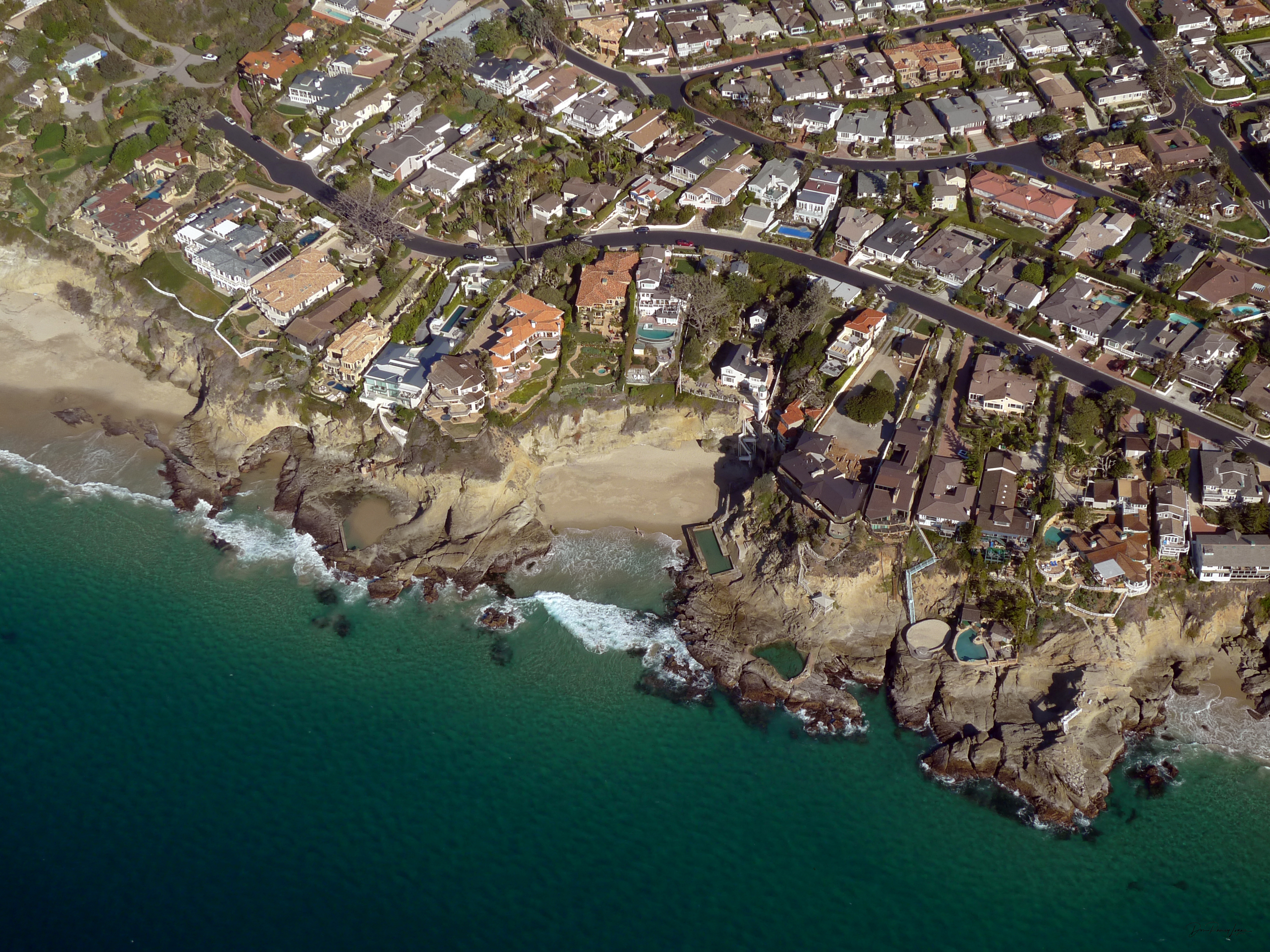
Three Arch Bay in Laguna Beach, Southern Orange County

Older cities in North Orange County like Santa Ana, Anaheim, Orange and Fullerton have traditional downtowns dating to the late 19th century, with Downtown Santa Ana being the home of the county, state and federal institutions. However, far more commercial activity is concentrated in clusters of newer commercial development located further south in the county's edge cities which include:

- Anaheim–Santa Ana, running along Interstate 5 between Disneyland and Downtown Santa Ana,
- The South Coast Metro, located along Interstate 405 and including South Coast Plaza, John Wayne Airport and the Irvine Business Complex; and
- Irvine Spectrum in eastern Irvine, at the interchange where I-5 and I-405 meet.

=== National protected areas ===
- Cleveland National Forest (part)
- Seal Beach National Wildlife Refuge

== Demographics ==
Historical population
Census	Pop.	Note	%±
1890	13,589		—
1900	19,696		44.9%
1910	34,436		74.8%
1920	61,375		78.2%
1930	118,674		93.4%
1940	130,760		10.2%
1950	216,224		65.4%
1960	703,925		225.6%
1970	1,420,386		101.8%
1980	1,932,709		36.1%
1990	2,410,556		24.7%
2000	2,846,289		18.1%
2010	3,010,232		5.8%
2020	3,186,989		5.9%
2025 (est.)	3,149,507	▼	−1.2%
U.S. Decennial Census

=== 2020 census ===
As of the 2020 census, the county had a population of 3,186,989. The median age was 39.0 years, 20.9% of residents were under the age of 18, and 15.7% were 65 years of age or older. For every 100 females there were 96.3 males, and for every 100 females age 18 and over there were 94.1 males age 18 and over.

The racial makeup of the county was 1,383,257 (43.4%) White, 53,842 (1.7%) African American, 38,322 (1.2%) Native American, 706,813 (22.2%) Asian, 9,035 (0.3%) Pacific Islander, 548,539 (17.2%) from other races, and 447,181 (14.0%) from two or more races. Hispanic or Latino residents of any race numbered 1,086,834 persons (34.1%).

99.8% of residents lived in urban areas, while 0.2% lived in rural areas.

There were 1,074,105 households in the county, of which 33.4% had children under the age of 18 living with them and 25.2% had a female householder with no spouse or partner present. About 20.6% of all households were made up of individuals and 9.2% had someone living alone who was 65 years of age or older.

There were 1,129,785 housing units, of which 4.9% were vacant. Among occupied housing units, 56.1% were owner-occupied and 43.9% were renter-occupied. The homeowner vacancy rate was 0.9% and the rental vacancy rate was 4.8%.

=== Racial and ethnic composition ===
Orange County, California – Racial and ethnic composition Note: the US Census treats Hispanic/Latino as an ethnic category. This table excludes Latinos from the racial categories and assigns them to a separate category. Hispanics/Latinos may be of any race.
Race / Ethnicity (NH = Non-Hispanic)	Pop 1980	Pop 1990	Pop 2000	Pop 2010	Pop 2020	% 1980	% 1990	% 2000	% 2010	% 2020
White alone (NH)	1,510,698	1,554,501	1,458,978	1,328,499	1,198,655	78.16%	64.49%	51.26%	44.13%	37.61%
Black or African American alone (NH)	24,411	39,159	42,639	44,000	49,304	1.26%	1.62%	1.50%	1.46%	1.55%
Native American or Alaska Native alone (NH)	12,951	8,584	8,414	6,216	5,298	0.67%	0.36%	0.30%	0.21%	0.17%
Asian alone (NH)	86,893	240,756	383,810	532,477	699,124	4.50%	9.99%	13.48%	17.69%	21.94%
Native Hawaiian or Pacific Islander alone (NH)	x (Note: included in the Asian category in the 1980 Census)	x (Note: included in the Asian category in the 1990 Census)	8,086	8,357	7,714	0.28%	0.28%	0.28%	0.28%	0.24%
Other race alone (NH)	11,417	2,728	4,525	5,593	14,818	0.59%	0.11%	0.16%	0.19%	0.46%
Mixed race or Multiracial (NH)	x (Note: not an option in the 1980 Census)	x (Note: not an option in the 1990 Census)	64,258	72,117	125,242	x	x	2.26%	2.40%	3.93%
Hispanic or Latino (any race)	286,339	564,828	875,579	1,012,973	1,086,834	14.82%	23.43%	30.76%	33.65%	34.10%
Total	1,932,709	2,410,556	2,846,289	3,010,232	3,186,989	100.00%	100.00%	100.00%	100.00%	100.00%

=== American Community Survey 2025 data ===
The United States Census Bureau estimated that in 2025, Orange County’s population was 3.149.507. It was also estimated that the county's population was 35,54% Non-Hispanic White, 34,51% Hispanic or Latino, 1,69% Non-Hispanic Black, 24,17% Asian, 0,17% Native American, 0,25% Pacific Islander, and 3,67% Multiracial.

Total	Population	Percentage
Non-Hispanic White	1.119.315	35,54%
Hispanic or Latino	1.086.772	34,51%
Non-Hispanic Black	53.140	1,69%
Asian	761.345	24,17%
Native American	5.459	0,17%
Pacific Islander	7.886	0,25%
Non-Hispanic Multiracial	115.590	3,67%

==== Racial / Ethnic Profile of places in Orange County, California ====
Racial / Ethnic Profile of places in Orange County, California (2020 Census)
Following is a table of cities and census-designated places in Orange County. Data for the United States (with and without Puerto Rico), the state of California, and Orange County itself have been included for comparison purposes.
The majority racial/ethnic group is coded per the key below.

Majority minority with no dominant group
Majority White
Majority Black
Majority Hispanic
Majority Asian

Racial and ethnic composition of places in Orange County, California (2020 Census) (NH = Non-Hispanic) Note: the US Census treats Hispanic/Latino as an ethnic category. This table excludes Latinos from the racial categories and assigns them to a separate category. Hispanics/Latinos may be of any race.
Place	Designation	Total Population	White alone (NH)	%	Black or African American alone (NH)	%	Native American or Alaska Native alone (NH)	%	Asian alone (NH)	%	Pacific Islander alone (NH)	%	Other race alone (NH)	%	Mixed race or Multiracial (NH)	%	Hispanic or Latino (any race)	%
United States of America (50 states and D.C.)	x	331,449,281	191,697,647	57.84%	39,940,338	12.05%	2,251,699	0.68%	19,618,719	5.92%	622,018	0.19%	1,689,833	0.51%	13,548,983	4.09%	62,080,044	18.73%
United States of America (50 states, D.C., and Puerto Rico)	x	334,735,155	191,722,195	57.28%	39,944,624	11.93%	2,252,011	0.67%	19,621,465	5.86%	622,109	0.19%	1,692,341	0.51%	13,551,323	4.05%	65,329,087	19.52%
California	State	39,538,223	13,714,587	34.69%	2,119,286	5.36%	156,085	0.39%	5,978,795	15.12%	138,167	0.35%	223,929	0.57%	1,627,722	4.12%	15,579,652	39.40%
Orange County	County	3,186,989	1,198,655	37.61%	49,304	1.55%	5,298	0.17%	699,124	21.94%	7,714	0.24%	14,818	0.46%	125,242	3.93%	1,086,834	34.10%
Aliso Viejo	City	52,176	29,044	55.67%	949	1.82%	48	0.09%	8,509	16.31%	155	0.30%	323	0.62%	3,312	6.35%	9,836	18.85%
Anaheim	City	346,824	78,237	22.56%	8,465	2.44%	646	0.19%	60,632	17.48%	1,297	0.37%	1,485	0.43%	9,411	2.71%	186,651	53.82%
Brea	City	47,325	18,256	38.58%	784	1.66%	101	0.21%	13,082	27.64%	54	0.11%	230	0.49%	1,846	3.90%	12,972	27.41%
Buena Park	City	84,034	16,331	19.43%	2,504	2.98%	174	0.21%	27,499	32.72%	373	0.44%	345	0.41%	2,478	2.95%	34,330	40.85%
Costa Mesa	City	111,918	54,169	48.40%	1,306	1.17%	232	0.21%	9,455	8.45%	412	0.37%	618	0.55%	4,931	4.41%	40,795	36.45%
Coto de Caza	CDP	14,710	10,722	72.89%	178	1.21%	15	0.10%	1,354	9.20%	7	0.05%	73	0.50%	839	5.70%	1,522	10.35%
Cypress	City	50,151	16,356	32.61%	1,522	3.03%	85	0.17%	18,743	37.37%	251	0.50%	203	0.40%	2,302	4.59%	10,689	21.31%
Dana Point	City	33,107	23,463	70.87%	268	0.81%	66	0.20%	1,291	3.90%	30	0.09%	163	0.49%	1,532	4.63%	6,294	19.01%
Fountain Valley	City	57,047	22,320	38.97%	526	0.92%	71	0.12%	22,532	39.50%	126	0.22%	234	0.41%	2,491	4.37%	8,837	15.49%
Fullerton	City	143,617	42,150	29.35%	2,972	2.07%	289	0.20%	37,913	26.40%	266	0.19%	691	0.48%	5,111	3.56%	54,225	37.76%
Garden Grove	City	171,949	28,172	16.38%	1,595	0.93%	220	0.13%	72,524	42.18%	759	0.44%	688	0.40%	3,889	2.26%	64,102	37.28%
Huntington Beach	City	198,711	117,536	59.15%	2,111	1.06%	443	0.22%	25,921	13.04%	532	0.27%	1,234	0.62%	11,477	5.78%	39,457	19.86%
Irvine	City	307,670	106,056	34.47%	6,646	2.16%	285	0.09%	139,725	45.41%	341	0.11%	1,790	0.58%	16,972	5.52%	35,855	11.65%
La Habra	City	63,097	14,953	23.70%	1,047	1.66%	143	0.23%	7,802	12.37%	60	0.10%	254	0.40%	1,399	2.22%	37,439	59.34%
La Palma	City	15,581	3,324	21.33%	766	4.92%	18	0.12%	7,835	50.29%	77	0.49%	54	0.35%	568	3.65%	2,939	18.86%
Ladera Ranch	CDP	26,170	17,039	65.11%	253	0.97%	40	0.15%	3,389	12.95%	28	0.11%	115	0.44%	1,699	6.49%	3,607	13.78%
Laguna Beach	City	23,032	18,328	79.58%	181	0.79%	25	0.11%	961	4.17%	18	0.08%	130	0.56%	1,234	5.36%	2,155	9.36%
Laguna Hills	City	31,374	16,849	53.70%	420	1.34%	32	0.10%	4,715	15.03%	41	0.13%	173	0.55%	1,655	5.28%	7,489	23.87%
Laguna Niguel	City	64,355	42,824	66.54%	766	1.19%	115	0.18%	6,306	9.80%	67	0.10%	344	0.53%	3,423	5.32%	10,510	16.33%
Laguna Woods	City	17,644	12,206	69.18%	158	0.90%	9	0.05%	3,796	21.51%	10	0.06%	35	0.20%	491	2.78%	939	5.32%
Lake Forest	City	85,858	40,506	47.18%	1,312	1.53%	153	0.18%	16,650	19.39%	144	0.17%	450	0.52%	4,698	5.47%	21,945	25.56%
Las Flores	CDP	5,995	3,499	58.37%	80	1.33%	9	0.15%	948	15.81%	10	0.17%	38	0.63%	350	5.84%	1,061	17.70%
Los Alamitos	City	11,780	5,449	46.26%	347	2.95%	34	0.29%	2,060	17.49%	69	0.59%	68	0.58%	727	6.17%	3,026	25.69%
Midway City	CDP	8,825	1,148	13.01%	45	0.51%	13	0.15%	5,597	52.09%	16	0.18%	24	0.27%	179	2.03%	8,825	31.76%
Mission Viejo	City	93,653	57,790	61.71%	1,134	1.21%	117	0.12%	10,822	11.56%	152	0.16%	454	0.48%	5,198	5.55%	17,986	19.20%
Modjeska	CDP	632	449	71.04%	1	0.16%	9	1.42%	20	3.16%	1	0.16%	2	0.32%	48	7.59%	102	16.14%
Newport Beach	City	85,239	64,352	75.50%	626	0.73%	100	0.12%	7,443	8.73%	81	0.10%	417	0.49%	4,030	4.73%	8,190	9.61%
North Tustin	CDP	25,718	16,478	64.07%	163	0.63%	27	0.10%	2,956	11.49%	38	0.15%	109	0.42%	1,467	5.70%	4,480	17.42%
Orange	City	139,911	55,330	39.55%	2,221	1.59%	289	0.21%	18,058	12.91%	328	0.23%	666	0.48%	5,444	3.89%	57,575	41.15%
Placentia	City	51,824	18,993	36.65%	946	1.83%	105	0.20%	9,940	19.18%	69	0.13%	219	0.42%	1,861	3.59%	19,691	38.00%
Rancho Mission Viejo	CDP	10,378	6,879	66.28%	115	1.11%	17	0.16%	1,163	11.21%	7	0.07%	60	0.58%	602	5.80%	1,535	14.79%
Rancho Santa Margarita	City	47,949	27,930	58.25%	761	1.59%	73	0.15%	5,711	11.91%	92	0.19%	225	0.47%	2,860	5.96%	10,297	21.47%
Rossmoor	CDP	10,625	6,623	62.33%	101	0.95%	12	0.11%	1,526	14.36%	24	0.23%	30	0.28%	681	6.41%	1,628	15.32%
San Clemente	City	64,293	45,889	71.37%	382	0.59%	180	0.28%	2,513	3.91%	88	0.14%	353	0.55%	3,209	4.99%	11,679	18.17%
San Juan Capistrano	City	35,196	18,591	52.82%	139	0.39%	106	0.30%	1,194	3.39%	22	0.06%	147	0.42%	1,293	3.67%	13,704	38.94%
Santa Ana	City	310,227	26,428	8.52%	2,745	0.88%	485	0.16%	37,440	12.07%	635	0.20%	921	0.30%	3,541	1.14%	238,022	76.73%
Seal Beach	City	25,242	16,814	66.61%	370	1.47%	53	0.21%	3,624	14.36%	46	0.18%	91	0.36%	1,091	4.32%	3,153	12.49%
Silverado	CDP	932	736	78.97%	3	0.32%	4	0.43%	23	2.47%	4	0.43%	7	0.75%	38	4.08%	117	12.55%
Stanton	City	37,962	5,968	15.72%	666	1.75%	58	0.15%	11,250	29.63%	208	0.55%	198	0.52%	807	2.13%	18,807	49.54%
Trabuco Canyon	CDP	1,020	718	70.39%	12	1.18%	2	0.20%	62	6.08%	0	0.00%	7	0.69%	61	5.98%	158	15.49%
Tustin	City	80,276	22,901	28.53%	1,619	2.02%	95	0.12%	19,043	23.72%	193	0.24%	418	0.52%	3,295	4.10%	32,712	40.75%
Villa Park	City	5,843	3,641	62.31%	47	0.80%	2	0.03%	1,116	19.10%	5	0.09%	13	0.22%	295	5.05%	724	12.39%
Westminster	City	90,911	17,962	19.76%	853	0.94%	146	0.16%	46,513	51.16%	415	0.46%	250	0.27%	2,427	2.67%	22,345	24.58%
Williams Canyon	CDP	93	70	75.27%	0	0.00%	0	0.00%	1	1.08%	0	0.00%	0	0.00%	2	2.15%	20	21.51%
Yorba Linda	City	68,336	36,022	52.71%	786	1.15%	100	0.15%	15,570	22.78%	63	0.09%	374	0.55%	3,152	4.61%	12,269	17.95%

=== 2010 census ===
Orange County population density map. Darker shades indicate more densely populated census tract.

The 2010 United States census reported that Orange County had a population of 3,010,232. The racial makeup of Orange County was 1,830,758 (60.8%) White (44.0% non-Hispanic white), 50,744 (1.7%) African American, 18,132 (0.6%) Native American, 537,804 (17.9%) Asian, 9,354 (0.3%) Pacific Islander, 435,641 (14.5%) from other races, and 127,799 (4.2%) from two or more races. Hispanic or Latino of any race were 1,012,973 persons (33.7%).

The Hispanic and Latino population is predominantly of Mexican origin; this group accounts for 28.5% of the county's population, followed by Salvadorans (0.8%), Guatemalans (0.5%), Puerto Ricans (0.4%), Cubans (0.3%), Colombians (0.3%), and Peruvians (0.3%). Santa Ana with its population reportedly 75 percent Hispanic/Latino, is among the most Hispanic/Latino percentage cities in both California and the U.S., esp. of Mexican-American descent.

Among the Asian population, 6.1% are Vietnamese, followed by Koreans (2.9%), Chinese (2.7%), Filipinos (2.4%), Indians (1.4%), Japanese (1.1%), Cambodians (0.2%), Pakistanis (0.2%), Thais (0.1%), Indonesians (0.1%), and Laotians (0.1%). According to KPCC in 2014, Orange County has the largest proportion of Asian Americans in Southern California, where one in five residents is an Asian American. There is also a significant Muslim population in the county.

=== 2000 census ===
As of the census of 2000, there were 2,846,289 people, 935,287 households, and 667,794 families living in the county, making Orange County the second most populous county in California. The population density was 1,392/km^{2} (3,606/sq mi). There were 969,484 housing units at an average density of 474/km^{2} (1,228/sq mi). The racial makeup of the county was 64.8% White, 13.6% Asian, 1.7% African American, 0.7% Native American, 0.3% Pacific Islander, 14.8% from other races, and 4.1% from two or more races. 30.8% were Hispanic or Latino of any race. 8.9% were of German, 6.9% English and 6.0% Irish ancestry according to Census 2000. 58.6% spoke only English at home; 25.3% spoke Spanish, 4.7% Vietnamese, 1.9% Korean, 1.5% Chinese (Cantonese or Mandarin) and 1.2% Tagalog.

In 1990, still according to the census there were 2,410,556 people living in the county. The racial makeup of the county was 78.6% White, 10.3% Asian or Pacific Islander, 1.8% African American, 0.5% Native American, and 8.8% from other races. 23.4% were Hispanic or Latino of any race.

Out of 935,287 households, 37.0% had children under the age of 18 living with them, 55.9% married couples were living together, 10.7% had a female householder with no husband present, and 28.6% were non-families. 21.1% of all households were made up of individuals, and 7.2% had someone living alone who was 65 years of age or older. The average household size was 3.00 and the average family size was 3.48.

Ethnic change has been transforming the population. By 2009, nearly 45 percent of the residents spoke a language other than English at home. Whites now comprise only 45 percent of the population, while the numbers of Hispanics grow steadily, along with Vietnamese, Korean and Chinese families. The percentage of foreign-born residents jumped to 30 percent in 2008 from 6 percent in 1970. The mayor of Irvine, Sukhee Kang, was born in Korea, making him the first Korean-American to run a major American city. "We have 35 languages spoken in our city," Kang observed. The population is diverse age-wise, with 27.0% under the age of 18, 9.4% from 18 to 24, 33.2% from 25 to 44, 20.6% from 45 to 64, and 9.9% 65 years of age or older. The median age is 33 years. For every 100 females, there were 99.0 males. For every 100 females age 18 and over, there were 96.7 males.

The median income for a household in the county was $61,899, and the median income for a family was $75,700 (these figures had risen to $71,601 and $81,260 respectively as of a 2007 estimate). Males had a median income of $45,059 versus $34,026 for females. The per capita income for the county was $25,826. About 7.0% of families and 10.3% of the population were below the poverty line, including 13.2% of those under age 18 and 6.2% of those age 65 or over.

Residents of Orange County are known as "Orange Countians".

In 2016, the top countries of origin for Orange County's immigrants were Mexico, Vietnam, Korea, the Philippines, China, India, Iran, Japan and El Salvador.

== Government ==
Charter of the County of Orange, with amendments through June 2016

The Government of Orange County operates as a charter county, defined and authorized under the California Constitution, California law and the Charter of the County of Orange. Much of the Government of California is in practice the responsibility of local governments such as the Government of Orange County. Santa Ana serves as the county seat of Orange County.

The elected offices of the county government consist of the five-member board of supervisors, assessor, auditor-controller, clerk-recorder, district attorney-public administrator, sheriff-coroner, and treasurer-tax collector. Except for the board of supervisors, each of these elected officers are elected by the voters of the entire county and oversee their own county departments.

A seventh countywide elected officer, the County Superintendent of Schools (jointly with an independently elected County Board of Education) oversees the independent Orange County Department of Education.

As of 2025, the Board of Supervisors oversees a $10.8 billion annual budget and over 16,000 employees. The county government is managed on a day-to-day basis by a county executive officer and is organized into many departments. Outside of the elected official departments (named above), the board of supervisors manage the following departments: Clerk of the Board, County Counsel, Orange County Ethics Commission, Office of Independent Review and Internal Audit. Other major departments are grouped into four categories.

Public Protection

- Public Defender
- Probation

Community Services

- Social Services Agency
- Health Care Agency
- Child Support Services
- John Wayne Airport

Infrastructure & Environmental Resources

- OC Community Resources
- Registrar of Voters
- OC Waste and Recycling
- OC Public Works

=== Department of Education ===
The County Department of Education is wholly separate from the County government and is jointly overseen by the elected County Superintendent of Schools and the five-member Orange County Board of Education, whose trustees are popularly elected from five separate trustee areas.

=== County-level scandals ===
On July 12, 2010, it was revealed that former Sheriff Mike Carona received over $215,000 in pension checks in 2009, despite his felony conviction for attempting to obstruct a grand jury investigation. A 2005 state law denied a public pension to public officials convicted of wrongdoing in office, however, that law only applied to benefits accrued after December 2005. Carona became eligible for his pension at age 50, and is also entitled, by law, to medical and dental benefits. The county pension program continues to pay out his pension through 2023.

In October 2024, Supervisor Andrew Do submitted a guilty plea to conspiracy to commit bribery as a result of taking more than $550,000 in bribes for directing and voting in favor of more than $10 million in COVID funds to his daughter's charity. His plea deal included paying back bribes that he and his daughters had received. He was sentenced to five years in federal prison.

== Politics ==
Voter registration as of July 19, 2022
1. Democratic (37.4%)
2. Republican (33.3%)
3. No Party Preference (NPP) (23.6%)
4. American Independent (3.40%)
5. Libertarian (1.20%)
6. Green (0.30%)
7. Other Parties (0.80%)

=== Political history ===
From the mid-20th century until the 2010s, Orange County was known as a Republican stronghold and consistently sent Republican representatives to the state and federal legislatures—so strongly that Ronald Reagan described it as the place that "all the good Republicans go to die." It was one of five counties in the state that voted for Barry Goldwater in 1964. During most of the 20th century and up until 2016, Orange County was known for its political conservatism and for being a bastion for the Republican Party, with a 2005 academic study listing three Orange County cities as among America's 25 most conservative. Orange County's Republican registration reached its apex in 1991, 55.6% of registered voters. But with the 2008 election it began trending Democratic until Hillary Clinton won the county with an eight-point majority in 2016.

Hillary Clinton became the first Democrat since 1936 to carry Orange County in a presidential election and in the 2018 midterm elections the Democratic Party gained control of every Congressional seat in the county. Although Democrats controlled all congressional districts in Orange County at the time, Republicans maintained a lead in voter registration numbers (although it shrunk to less than a percentage point as of February 10, 2019, as compared with over 10% on February 10, 2013). The number of registered Democrats surpassed the number of registered Republicans in the county in August 2019. As the number of Democrats increased, the number of voters not aligned with a political party increased to comprise 27.4% of the county's voters in 2019. Republicans held a majority on the county Board of Supervisors until 2022, when Democrats established a 3–2 control of the body. Seven out of the 12 state legislators from Orange County are also Republicans.

In 2020, Joe Biden further improved slightly on Clinton's 2016 margin of victory. In 2023, the Republican party's registration was 33%, while the Democratic party's registration was 37.5%. In 2024, Orange County again voted for the Democratic nominee and California native Kamala Harris, though Harris only won a plurality by a smaller margin than Biden or Hillary Clinton. Orange County is one of six "reverse pivot counties", counties that voted Republican in 2008 and 2012 before voting Democratic in 2016 onward.

United States presidential election results for Orange County, California
Year	Republican		Democratic		Third party(ies)	
Year	No.	%	No.	%	No.	%
1892	1,152	39.74%	1,000	34.49%	747	25.77%
1896	1,932	51.06%	1,712	45.24%	140	3.70%
1900	2,155	51.24%	1,777	42.25%	274	6.51%
1904	2,665	59.54%	1,034	23.10%	777	17.36%
1908	3,244	53.74%	1,911	31.65%	882	14.61%
1912	123	1.08%	4,406	38.58%	6,892	60.34%
1916	10,609	56.59%	6,474	34.54%	1,663	8.87%
1920	12,797	71.52%	3,502	19.57%	1,594	8.91%
1924	19,913	67.35%	2,565	8.68%	7,088	23.97%
1928	30,572	79.35%	7,611	19.75%	344	0.89%
1932	22,623	45.91%	23,835	48.37%	2,818	5.72%
1936	23,494	43.31%	29,836	55.00%	921	1.70%
1940	36,070	55.49%	28,236	43.44%	691	1.06%
1944	38,394	56.92%	28,649	42.47%	407	0.60%
1948	48,587	60.88%	29,018	36.36%	2,209	2.77%
1952	80,994	70.29%	33,397	28.98%	844	0.73%
1956	113,510	66.82%	54,895	32.31%	1,474	0.87%
1960	174,891	60.81%	112,007	38.95%	701	0.24%
1964	224,196	55.89%	176,539	44.01%	430	0.11%
1968	314,905	63.14%	148,869	29.85%	34,933	7.00%
1972	448,291	68.27%	176,847	26.93%	31,515	4.80%
1976	408,632	62.16%	232,246	35.33%	16,555	2.52%
1980	529,797	67.90%	176,704	22.65%	73,711	9.45%
1984	635,013	74.70%	206,272	24.27%	8,792	1.03%
1988	586,230	67.75%	269,013	31.09%	10,064	1.16%
1992	426,613	43.87%	306,930	31.56%	239,006	24.58%
1996	446,717	51.67%	327,485	37.88%	90,374	10.45%
2000	541,299	55.75%	391,819	40.36%	37,787	3.89%
2004	641,832	59.68%	419,239	38.98%	14,328	1.33%
2008	579,064	50.19%	549,558	47.63%	25,065	2.17%
2012	582,332	51.87%	512,440	45.65%	27,892	2.48%
2016	507,148	42.35%	609,961	50.94%	80,412	6.71%
2020	676,498	44.44%	814,009	53.48%	31,606	2.08%
2024	654,815	47.06%	691,731	49.72%	44,761	3.22%

Gubernatorial elections results

Gubernatorial elections results
Year	Republican	Democratic
2022	51.5% 492,734	48.5% 464,206
2018	49.9% 539,951	50.1% 543,047
2014	55.6% 344,817	44.4% 275,707
2010	56.8% 499,878	37.4% 328,663
2006	69.7% 507,413	25.5% 185,388
2002	57.5% 368,152	34.7% 222,149
1998	52.1% 370,736	44.7% 318,198
1994	67.7% 516,811	27.7% 211,132
1990	63.7% 425,025	31.3% 208,886
1986	71.9% 468,092	26.5% 172,782
1982	61.4% 422,878	36.7% 252,572
1978	44.2% 272,076	48.7% 299,577
1974	56.9% 297,870	40.6% 212,638
1970	66.9% 308,982	31.5% 145,420
1966	72.2% 293,413	27.9% 113,275
1962	59.4% 169,962	39.2% 112,152
1958	53.6% 98,729	46.3% 85,364
1954	69.7% 63,148	30.3% 27,511
1950	75.4% 57,348	24.6% 18,711

The Republican margin began to narrow in the 1990s and 2000s as the state trended Democratic until the mid- to late-2010s when it voted for the Democratic Party in 2016 and in 2018, when the Democratic party won every United States House District anchored in the county, including four that had previously been held by Republicans. This prompted media outlets to declare Orange County's Republican leanings "dead", with the Los Angeles Times running an op-ed titled, "An obituary to old Orange County, dead at age 129." While Republicans were able to recapture two of the seven U.S. House seats in Orange County in 2020, Democrats continued to hold the other five, Biden won the county by a slightly greater margin than Clinton had, and Democrats received a majority of the votes in each of the seven congressional districts. Republicans still carry more weight at the local level, and in 2020 for the State Assembly elections, they won 50.2% of the vote and four out of seven seats of the county. In the 2022 midterm elections, no congressional districts flipped, though Republicans performed strongly in Orange County, with every statewide GOP candidate carrying it.

For the 119th United States Congress in the United States House of Representatives, Orange County is split between six congressional districts:

- California's 38th congressional district, represented by Democrat Linda Sánchez,
- California's 40th congressional district, represented by Republican Young Kim,
- California's 45th congressional district, represented by Democrat Derek Tran,
- California's 46th congressional district, represented by Democrat Lou Correa,
- California's 47th congressional district, represented by Democrat Dave Min, and
- California's 49th congressional district, represented by Democrat Mike Levin.

The 40th, 45th, 46th, and 47th districts are all centered in Orange County. The 38th has its population center in Los Angeles County, while the 49th is primarily San Diego County-based. 132, 154, 188 In the California State Senate, Orange County is split into 6 districts:

- the 30th senatorial district, represented by Democrat Bob Archuleta,
- the 32nd senatorial district, represented by Republican Kelly Seyarto,
- the 34th senatorial district, represented by Democrat Tom Umberg,
- the 36th senatorial district, represented by Republican Tony Strickland,
- the 37th senatorial district, represented by Republican Steven Choi, and
- the 38th senatorial district, represented by Democrat Catherine Blakespear.

In the California State Assembly, Orange County is split into 9 districts:

- the 59th Assembly district, represented by Republican Phillip Chen,
- the 64th Assembly district, represented by Democrat Blanca Pacheco,
- the 67th Assembly district, represented by Democrat Sharon Quirk-Silva,
- the 68th Assembly district, represented by Democrat Avelino Valencia,
- the 70th Assembly district, represented by Republican Tri Ta,
- the 71st Assembly district, represented by Republican Kate Sanchez,
- the 72nd Assembly district, represented by Republican Diane Dixon,
- the 73rd Assembly district, represented by Democrat Cottie Petrie-Norris, and
- the 74th Assembly district, represented by Republican Laurie Davies.

=== Overview ===
According to the California Secretary of State, as of February 10, 2019, Orange County has 1,591,543 registered voters. Of these, 34% (541,711) are registered Republicans, and 33.3% (529,651) are registered Democrats. An additional 28.5% (453,343) declined to state a political party.

Orange County has produced notable Republicans, such as President Richard Nixon (born in Yorba Linda and lived in Fullerton and San Clemente), U.S. Senator John F. Seymour (previously mayor of Anaheim), and U.S. Senator Thomas Kuchel (of Anaheim). Former Congressman Christopher Cox (of Newport Beach), a White House counsel for President Reagan, is also a former chairman of the U.S. Securities and Exchange Commission. Orange County was also home to former Republican Congressman John G. Schmitz, a presidential candidate in 1972 from the ultra-conservative American Independent Party, John Birch Society member, and the father of Mary Kay Letourneau. In 1996, Curt Pringle (later mayor of Anaheim) became the first Republican Speaker of the California State Assembly in decades.

While the growth of the county's Hispanic and Asian populations in recent decades has significantly influenced Orange County's culture, its conservative reputation has remained largely intact. Partisan voter registration patterns of Hispanics, Asians and other ethnic minorities in the county have tended to reflect the surrounding demographics, with resultant Republican majorities in all but the central portion of the county. When Loretta Sanchez, a Blue Dog Democrat, defeated veteran Republican Bob Dornan in 1996, she was continuing a trend of Democratic representation of that district that had been interrupted by Dornan's 1984 upset of former Congressman Jerry Patterson. Until 1992, Sanchez herself was a moderate Republican, and she is viewed as somewhat more moderate than other Democrats from Southern California.

The county is featured prominently in Lisa McGirr's book Suburban Warriors: The Origins of the New American Right. She argues that its conservative political orientation in the 20th century owed much to its settlement by farmers from the Great Plains, who reacted strongly to communist sympathies, the civil rights movement, and the turmoil of the 1960s in nearby Los Angeles — across the "Orange Curtain". In the 1970s and 1980s, Orange County was one of California's leading Republican voting blocs and a subculture of residents with "Middle American" values that emphasized capitalist religious morality in contrast to West coast liberalism.

Orange County has many Republican voters from culturally conservative Asian-American, Middle Eastern and Latino immigrant groups. The large Vietnamese-American communities in Garden Grove and Westminster are predominantly Republican; Vietnamese Americans registered Republicans outnumber those registered as Democrats, 55% to 22% as of 2007, while as of 2017 that figure is 42% to 36%. Republican Assemblyman Van Tran was the first Vietnamese-American elected to a state legislature and joined with Texan Hubert Vo as the highest-ranking elected Vietnamese-American in the United States until the 2008 election of Joseph Cao in Louisiana's 2nd congressional district. In the 2007 special election for the vacant county supervisor seat following Democrat Lou Correa's election to the state senate, two Vietnamese-American Republican candidates topped the list of 10 candidates, separated from each other by only seven votes, making the Orange County Board of Supervisors entirely Republican; Correa is first of only two Democrats to have served on the Board since 1987 and only the fifth since 1963.

Even with the Democratic sweep of Orange County's congressional seats in 2018, as well as a steady trend of Democratic gains in voter registration, the county remains very Republican downballot. Generally, larger cities–those with a population over 100,000, such as Anaheim, Santa Ana, and Irvine – feature a registration advantage for Democrats, while the other municipalities still have a Republican voter registration advantage. This is especially true in Newport Beach, Yorba Linda, and Villa Park, the three cities where the Republican advantage is largest. As of February 10, 2019, the only exceptions to the former are Huntington Beach and Orange, while exceptions to the latter include Buena Park, Laguna Beach and Stanton.

Similarly, despite Orange County supporting Democratic candidates for president in 2016, and 2020, there are still several smaller municipalities in the county that have continued to vote Republican for president. In addition to the aforementioned Newport Beach, Yorba Linda, and Villa Park, the cities of Huntington Beach, Dana Point, San Juan Capistrano, and San Clemente also supported Republican nominee Donald Trump for president twice.

=== Voter registration (2020 census) ===
Population and registered voters
Total population	3,186,989	
Registered voters (Note: Percentage of registered voters with respect to total population. Percentages of party members with respect to registered voters follow.)	1,811,669	56.85% total
Democratic	677,915	37.4%
Republican	603,479	33.3%
Democratic–Republican spread	+74,436	+4.1%
American Independent	61,539	3.4%
Green	5,990	0.3%
Libertarian	21,244	1.2%
Peace and Freedom	7,479	0.4%
Miscellaneous	6,855	0.4%
No party preference	427,168	23.6%

==== Cities by population and voter registration (2020 census) ====
Cities by population and voter registration
City	Population	Registered voters	Democratic	Republican	D–R spread	Other	No party preference
Aliso Viejo	52,176	63.5%	36.1%	33.2%	+2.9%	7.1%	23.6%
Anaheim	346,824	51.2%	42.2%	28.6%	+13.6%	6.0%	23.2%
Brea	47,325	64.8%	34.1%	38.0%	−3.9%	5.6%	22.3%
Buena Park	84,034	54.8%	40.1%	29.8%	+10.2%	5.5%	24.6%
Costa Mesa	111,918	56.9%	36.0%	33.6%	+2.5%	7.7%	22.7%
Cypress	50,151	64.5%	36.0%	34.2%	+1.8%	5.9%	23.9%
Dana Point	33,107	73.5%	29.9%	42.1%	−12.2%	8.0%	20.1%
Fountain Valley	57,047	68.4%	31.8%	38.8%	−7.0%	5.9%	23.4%
Fullerton	143,617	56.7%	39.5%	31.3%	+8.2%	6.0%	23.2%
Garden Grove	171,949	55.4%	36.5%	32.7%	+3.8%	5.7%	25.2%
Huntington Beach	198,711	68.6%	30.2%	41.7%	−11.5%	7.3%	20.8%
Irvine	307,670	52.9%	39.2%	25.7%	+13.5%	5.2%	29.9%
La Habra	63,097	56.2%	40.8%	32.0%	+8.8%	6.2%	21.0%
La Palma	15,581	64.9%	39.0%	32.6%	+6.4%	4.5%	23.8%
Laguna Beach	23,032	78.6%	42.1%	28.6%	+13.4%	7.8%	21.5%
Laguna Hills	31,374	65.1%	33.5%	36.8%	−3.3%	6.7%	22.9%
Laguna Niguel	64,355	71.9%	32.6%	38.0%	−5.5%	7.7%	21.7%
Laguna Woods	17,644	87.4%	41.0%	34.1%	+6.9%	5.2%	19.7%
Lake Forest	85,858	64.9%	34.6%	35.9%	−1.3%	6.6%	23.0%
Los Alamitos	11,780	63.8%	35.3%	36.4%	−1.1%	7.3%	21.0%
Mission Viejo	93,653	72.0%	33.0%	39.0%	−6.0%	6.7%	21.3%
Newport Beach	85,239	71.4%	24.9%	47.8%	−22.9%	6.5%	20.8%
Orange	139,911	58.6%	36.3%	35.4%	+0.9%	6.7%	21.6%
Placentia	51,824	64.0%	35.0%	36.6%	−1.7%	6.1%	22.2%
Rancho Santa Margarita	47,949	67.2%	31.2%	40.3%	−9.1%	6.7%	21.7%
San Clemente	64,293	71.5%	27.7%	44.7%	−17.0%	7.7%	19.9%
San Juan Capistrano	35,196	67.1%	31.1%	40.6%	−9.5%	7.3%	21.0%
Santa Ana	310,227	44.5%	49.8%	20.7%	+29.2%	5.7%	23.8%
Seal Beach	25,242	76.9%	36.2%	40.2%	−4.0%	6.0%	17.7%
Stanton	37,962	49.8%	42.0%	27.7%	+14.2%	5.7%	24.6%
Tustin	80,276	54.7%	39.9%	28.2%	+11.7%	6.1%	25.7%
Villa Park	5,843	81.0%	22.0%	51.9%	−29.9%	5.7%	20.4%
Westminster	90,911	60.7%	32.8%	35.7%	−2.8%	5.9%	25.6%
Yorba Linda	68,336	72.4%	25.9%	48.0%	−22.1%	5.7%	20.5%

=== Former congressional districts ===
Former congressional districts by year
Year	Congressional district(s)
1885–1893	6
1893–1903	7
1903–1913	8
1913–1933	11
1933–1943	19
1943–1953	22
1953–1963	28
1963–1973	34, 35
1973–1983	38, 39, 40
1983–1993	38, 39, 40
1993–2003	40, 46, 47, 48
2003–2013	40, 42, 44, 46, 47, 48

== Education ==
Orange County is the home of many colleges and universities, including:

Universities

- Public
  - University of California, Irvine (UCI)
  - California State University, Fullerton (CSUF)
- Private, religious
  - Concordia University Irvine
  - Hope International University
  - Trinity Law School
  - Vanguard University
- Private, secular
  - Anaheim University
  - Chapman University
  - Soka University of America
  - Western State University College of Law

Colleges

- Two-year (community colleges)
  - Coastline Community College
  - Cypress College
  - Fullerton College
  - Golden West College
  - Irvine Valley College
  - Orange Coast College
  - Saddleback College
  - Santa Ana College
  - Santiago Canyon College
- Four-year
  - Laguna College of Art and Design
  - Southern California Institute of Technology

Some institutions not based in Orange County operate satellite campuses, including the University of Southern California, National University, Pepperdine University, and Springfield College.

The Orange County Department of Education oversees 28 school districts.

== Economy ==
=== Business ===
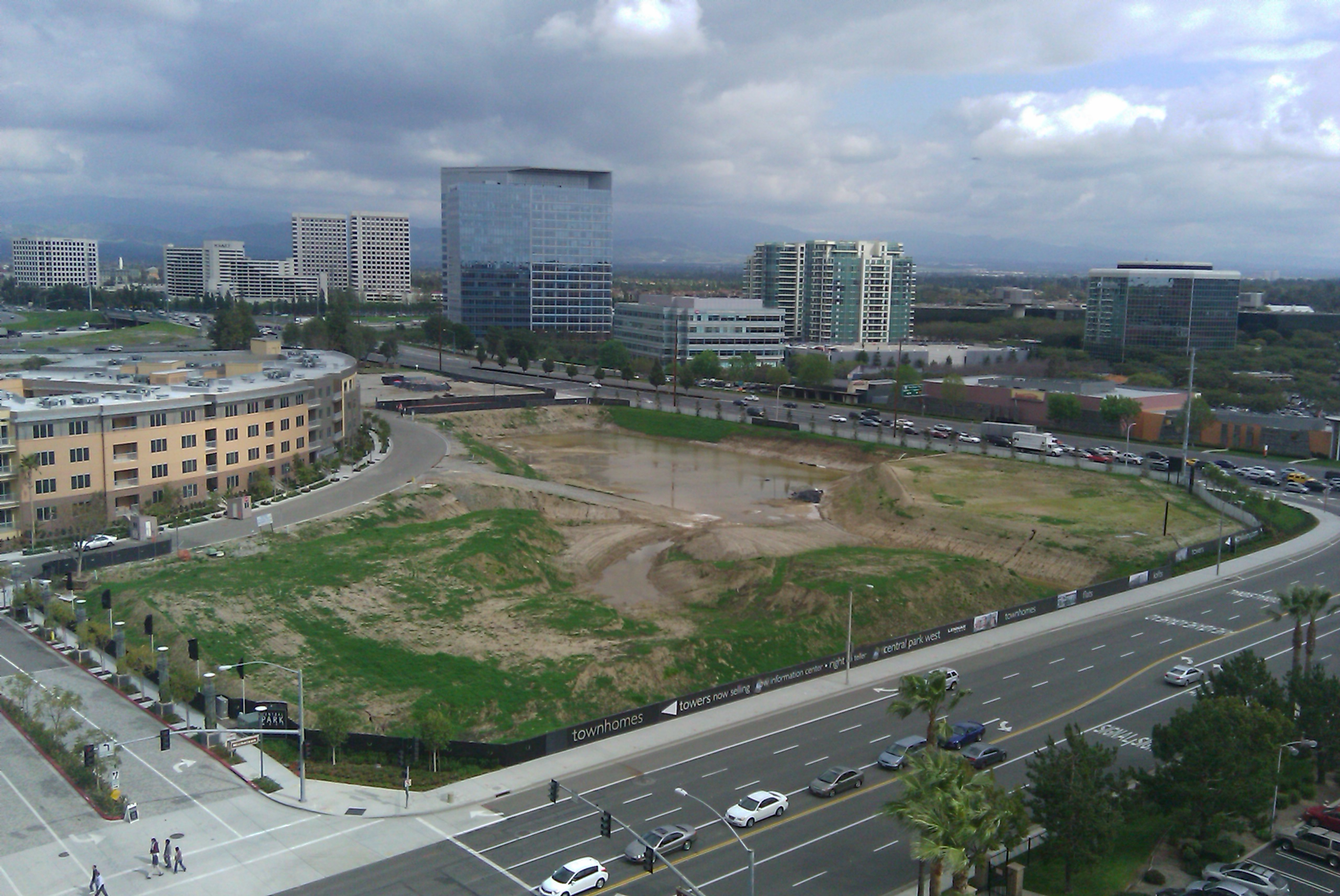
The developing urban core in the City of Irvine

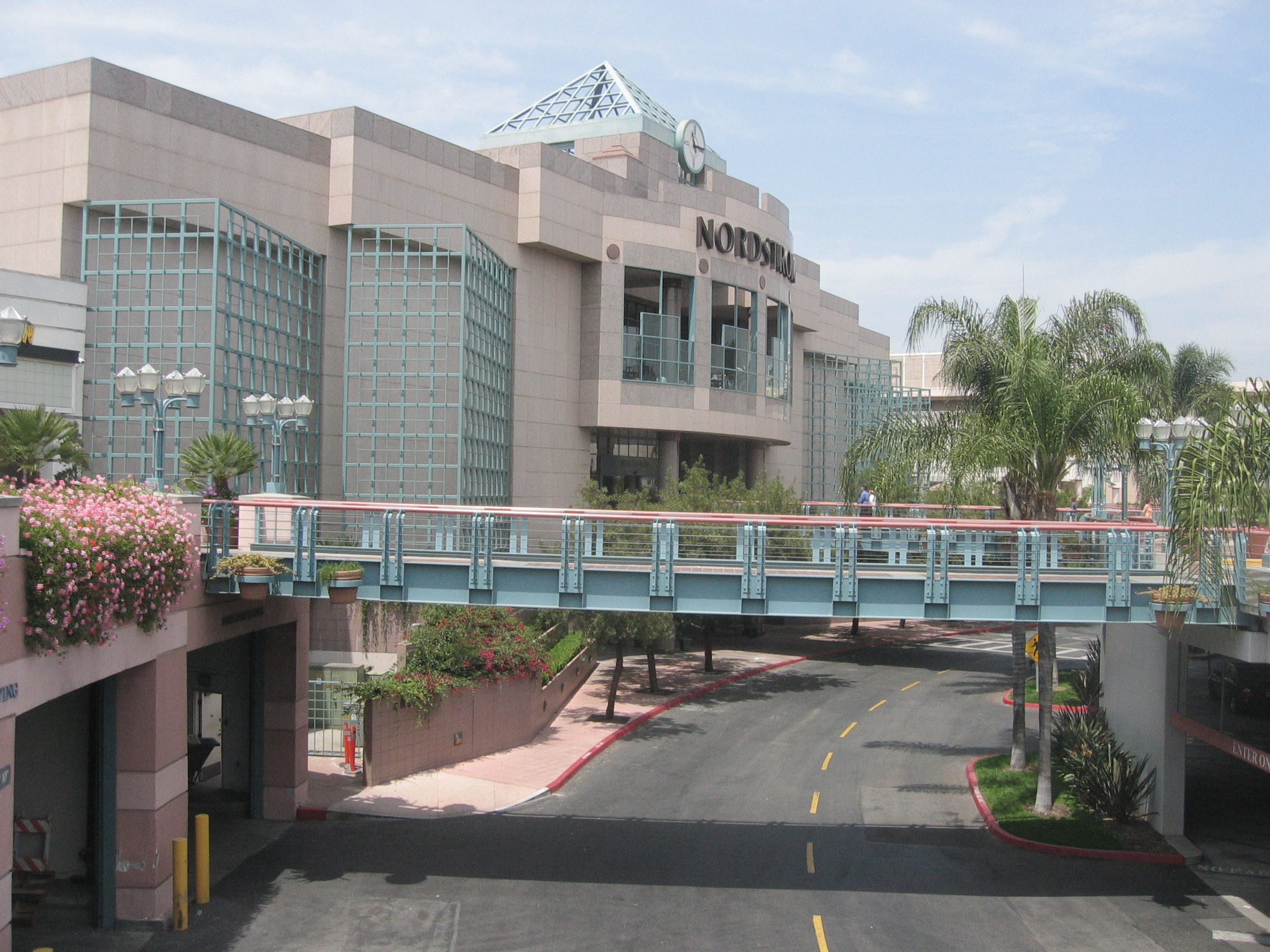
MainPlace Mall

Orange County is the headquarters of many Fortune 1000 companies including Ingram Micro (#95) in Irvine, Pacific Life (#272) and Chipotle Mexican Grill (#372) in Newport Beach, Edwards Lifesciences (#566) in Irvine, and First American Corporation (#570) in Santa Ana. Other headquarters in Orange County include medical device companies Beckman Coulter in Brea and Masimo in Irvine, and the staffing company Allied Universal in Santa Ana. Irvine is also the home of notable technology divisions like TV and sound bar company VIZIO, router manufacturer Linksys, video/computer game creator Blizzard Entertainment, and in-flight product manufacturer Panasonic Avionics Corporation. Also, the Mercedes-Benz Classic Center USA is located in the City of Irvine. Many regional headquarters for international businesses reside in Orange County like Mazda, Toshiba, Toyota, Samsung, Kia, in the City of Irvine, Mitsubishi in the City of Cypress, Kawasaki Motors in Foothill Ranch, and Hyundai in the City of Fountain Valley. Fashion is another important industry to Orange County. Oakley, Inc. a division of Luxottica is headquartered in Lake Forest. Hurley International a subsidiary of Bluestar Alliance LLC is headquartered in Costa Mesa. The shoe company Pleaser USA, Inc. is located in Fullerton. St. John is headquartered in Irvine. Tustin, is home to Ricoh Electronics, New American Funding, and Safmarine. Wet Seal is headquartered in Lake Forest. PacSun a chain owned by PSEB is headquartered in Anaheim. Restaurant chains including Taco Bell and In-N-Out Burger have headquarters in Irvine and other others including Marie Callender's, El Pollo Loco, Wienerschnitzel, and Del Taco have headquarters in Orange County.

=== Shopping ===
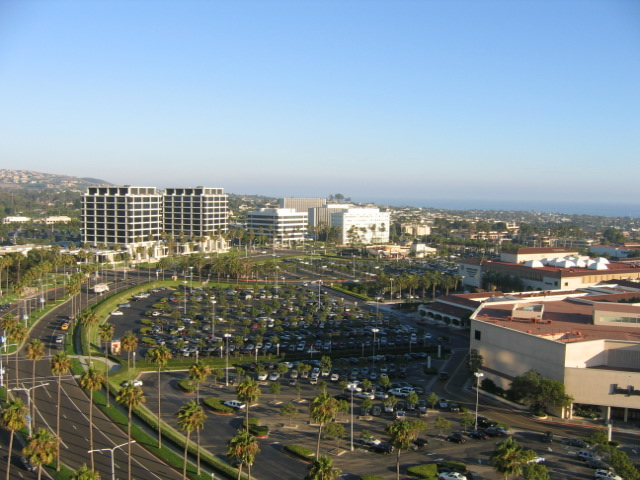
Newport Center and Fashion Island

Shopping in Orange County is centered around regional shopping malls, big box power centers and smaller strip malls. South Coast Plaza in Costa Mesa is the largest mall in California, the sixth largest in the United States, and 55th largest in the world. Other regional shopping malls include (from north to south): Brea Mall, The Village at Orange, MainPlace Santa Ana, Westminster Mall, Bella Terra in Huntington Beach, The Market Place straddling Tustin and Irvine, The District in Tustin, Irvine Spectrum Center, Fashion Island in Newport Beach, Five Lagunas and The Shops at Mission Viejo. Downtown Disney and Anaheim GardenWalk are specialized shopping and entertainment centers aimed at visitors. Power centers include La Habra Marketplace, Anaheim Plaza, and Anaheim Town Square. There are two major outlet malls, The Outlets at Orange and The Outlets at San Clemente.

=== Tourism ===
Tourism remains a vital aspect of Orange County's economy. Anaheim is the main tourist hub, with the Disneyland Resort's Disneyland being the second most visited theme park in the world. Also, Knott's Berry Farm gets about 7 million visitors annually and is located in the city of Buena Park. The Anaheim Convention Center holds many major conventions throughout the year. Resorts within the Beach Cities receive visitors throughout the year due to their close proximity to the beach, biking paths, mountain hiking trails, golf courses, shopping and dining.

== Arts and culture ==
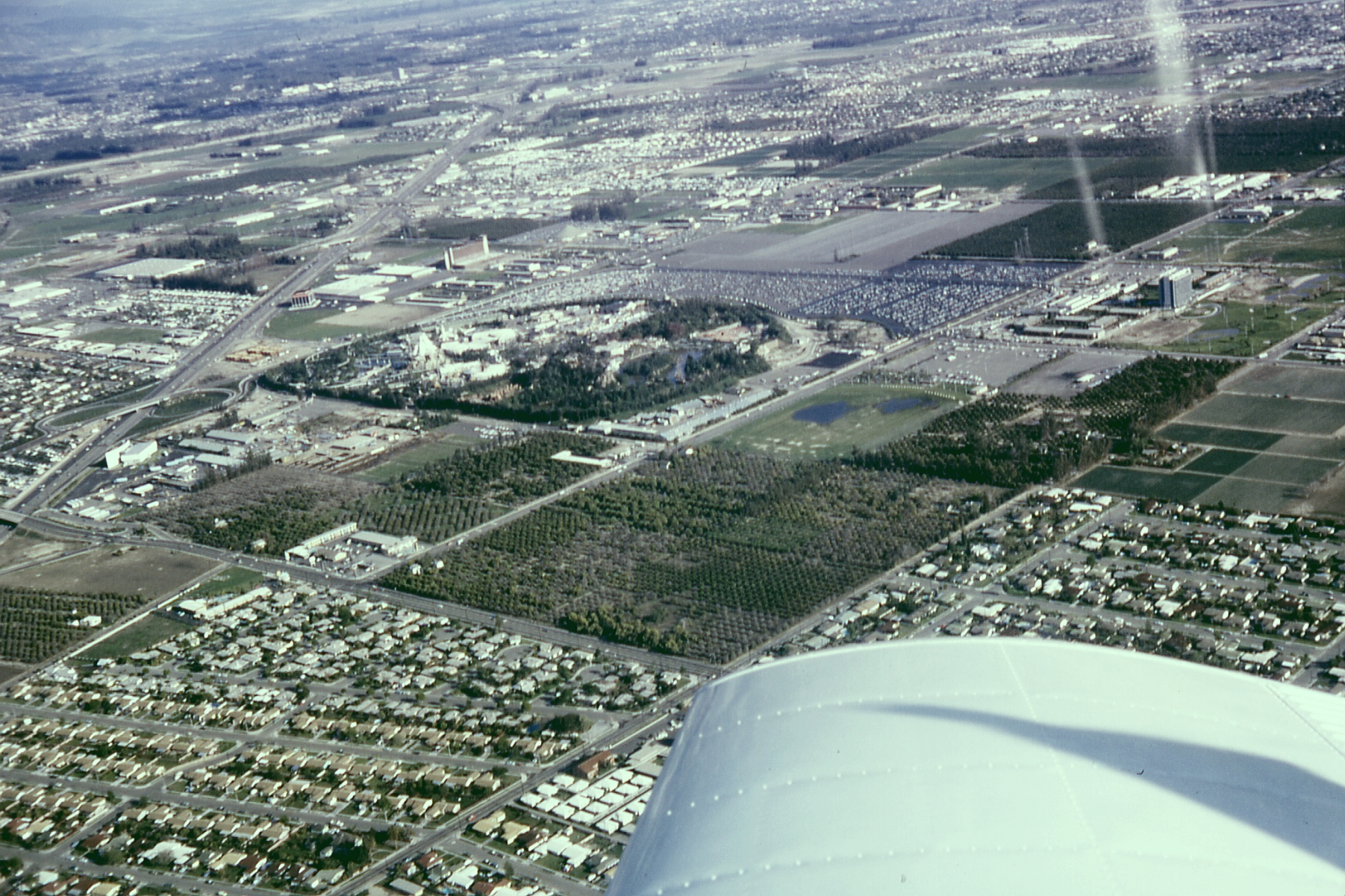
1965 aerial photo of Anaheim Disneyland, Disneyland Hotel with its Monorail Station. The Disneyland Heliport, surrounding orange groves, Santa Ana Freeway (now I-5) and the Melodyland Theater "in the round," and part of the City of Anaheim. Anaheim Stadium can be seen under construction near the upper left.

The area's warm Mediterranean climate and 42 mi (68 km) of year-round beaches attract millions of tourists annually. Huntington Beach is a hot spot for sunbathing and surfing; nicknamed Surf City USA, it is home to many surfing competitions. "The Wedge", at the tip of The Balboa Peninsula in Newport Beach, is one of the most famous body surfing spots in the world. Southern California surf culture is prominent in Orange County's beach cities. Another one of these beach cities being Laguna Beach, just south of Newport Beach. A few popular beaches include A Thousand Steps on 9th Street, Main Street Beach, and The Montage.

Other tourist destinations include the theme parks Disneyland and Disney California Adventure in Anaheim and Knott's Berry Farm in Buena Park. Due to the 2022 reopening of Wild Rivers in Irvine, the county is home to three water parks along with Soak City in Buena Park and Great Wolf Lodge in Anaheim. The Anaheim Convention Center is the largest such facility on the West Coast. The Old Towne, Orange Historic District in the City of Orange (the traffic circle at the middle of Chapman Avenue at Glassell Street) still maintains its 1950s image, and appeared in the movie That Thing You Do!.

Little Saigon is another tourist destination, home to the largest concentration of Vietnamese people outside Vietnam. There are also sizable Taiwanese, Filipino, Chinese, and Korean communities, particularly in western Orange County. This is evident in several Asian-influenced shopping centers in Asian American hubs like Irvine. Popular food festival 626 Night Market has a location at OC Fair & Event Center in Costa Mesa and is a popular attraction for Asian and fusion food, as well as an Art Walk and live entertainment.

Historical points of interest include Mission San Juan Capistrano, the destination of migrating swallows. The Richard Nixon Presidential Library and Museum is in Yorba Linda and the Richard Nixon Birthplace, on the grounds of the Library, is a National Historic Landmark. John Wayne's yacht, the Wild Goose or USS YMS-328, is in Newport Beach. Other notable structures include the home of Madame Helena Modjeska, in Modjeska Canyon on Santiago Creek; Ronald Reagan Federal Building and Courthouse in Santa Ana, the largest building in the county; the historic Balboa Pavilion and Balboa Fun Zone in Newport Beach, and the Huntington Beach Pier. The county has nationally known centers of worship, such as Crystal Cathedral in Garden Grove, the largest house of worship in California; Saddleback Church in Lake Forest, one of the largest churches in the United States; and the Calvary Chapel.

=== Religion ===
In 2014, the county had 1,075 religious organizations, the sixth-highest total among all US counties (matching its status as the sixth most populous county in the US).

Orange County is the base for several religious organizations:

- The Newport Beach California Temple and Yorba Linda California Temple, two of five temples operated by the Church of Jesus Christ of Latter-day Saints in Southern California.
- Christ Cathedral (formerly Reverend Robert Schuller's Crystal Cathedral) is the cathedral of the Roman Catholic Diocese of Orange, located in Garden Grove.
- University Synagogue, one of the world's largest Reconstructionist Jewish synagogues located in Irvine to serve the sizable Jewish community in the area, especially students at nearby University of California, Irvine.
- Beth Jacob Congregation of Irvine, the largest Orthodox Jewish synagogue between Los Angeles and San Diego, serving several thousand families.
- Temple Beth El of South Orange County, located in Aliso Viejo, and built in 2001 to serve the fast-growing Jewish community in Orange County, this 65,000 ft^{2} (6,000 m^{2}) synagogue can seat 1,400 congregants and is the largest by size in Orange County, and is one of the largest places of worship in the state in terms of size. Temple Beth El is affiliated with both the Reform and Conservative Judaism denominations.
- Temple Bat Yahm of Newport Beach, is the largest Reform synagogue in Newport Beach and serves more than 500 families.
- Chabad of Orange County, serves more than 100,000 Jewish families at more than of a dozen of its synagogues and community centers located in Irvine, Laguna Woods, Newport Beach, Aliso Viejo, Mission Viejo, Rancho Santa Margarita, San Clemente, North Irvine, Laguna Niguel, Yorba Linda, Tustin, Dana Point, Huntington Beach and Laguna Beach. These synagogues adhere to the Chabad-Lubavitch school of Orthodox Judaism, but all Jews are welcome to worship regardless of denomination or background.
- Temple Beth Emet of Anaheim, is the only synagogue in Anaheim and was the first Conservative Jewish synagogue to open in Orange County back in 1955.
- Islamic Center of Irvine, which has raised over $5.5 million for its expansion project (as of October 2018).
- Islamic Institute of Orange County, an Islamic Center in Orange County, located in Anaheim and founded in 1991.
- The Islamic Society of Orange County in Garden Grove, established in 1976 and one of the largest mosques in the United States.
- Islamic Center of Santa Ana (ICSA), which opened a new $2.6 million facility in 2017.
- Orange County Islamic Foundation, located in Mission Viejo.
- The Islamic Educational Center of Orange County (IECOC), located in Costa Mesa close to Irvine, California's largest Muslim community.
- Forty Martyrs Armenian Apostolic Church, located in Santa Ana is one of two Armenian Apostolic Church, otherwise referred to as "Armenian Orthodox Church" or "Gregorian Church" in Orange County.
- St. Mary Armenian Church, located in Costa Mesa is one of two Armenian Apostolic Church, otherwise referred to as "Armenian Orthodox Church" or "Gregorian Church" in Orange County.
- Family International, also known as "The Children of God", was founded in 1968 in Huntington Beach by David Berg.
- Chuck Smith, early leader in the Jesus People movement and founder of Calvary Chapel in Costa Mesa.
- Pao Fa Temple in Irvine is one of the largest Buddhist monasteries and temples in the United States.
- The Purpose Driven Life author Rick Warren and his Saddleback Church (the largest church in California) are in Lake Forest.
- The Roman Catholic Diocese of Orange headed by Bishop Kevin Vann. There are about 1.04 million Catholics in Orange County.
- Trinity Broadcasting Network began as Channel 40 in Tustin, now in Costa Mesa.
- Monasteries of the Vedanta Society and St. Michael's Abbey are located in Trabuco Canyon.
- The Vineyard Christian Fellowship movement began in Orange County.
- The Jain Center of Southern California in Buena Park, largest center for followers of Jain faith, originally started by Jains from India
- The Sikh Center of Orange County located in Santa Ana
- The Sikh Center of Buena Park – Gurdwara Singh Sabha
- Harvest Orange County in Irvine. Also holds the Harvest Crusades in Anaheim Stadium.
- Living Stream Ministry is headquartered in Anaheim and hosts several Christian conferences a year.
- Orange County Buddhist Center in Laguna Hills, part of the Soka Gakkai International

== Sports ==
Huntington Beach annually plays host to the U.S. Open of Surfing, AVP Pro Beach Volleyball and Vans World Championship of Skateboarding. It was also the shooting location for Pro Beach Hockey. USA Water Polo, Inc. has moved its headquarters to Irvine, California. Orange County's active outdoor culture is home to many surfers, skateboarders, mountain bikers, cyclists, climbers, hikers, kayaking, sailing and sand volleyball.

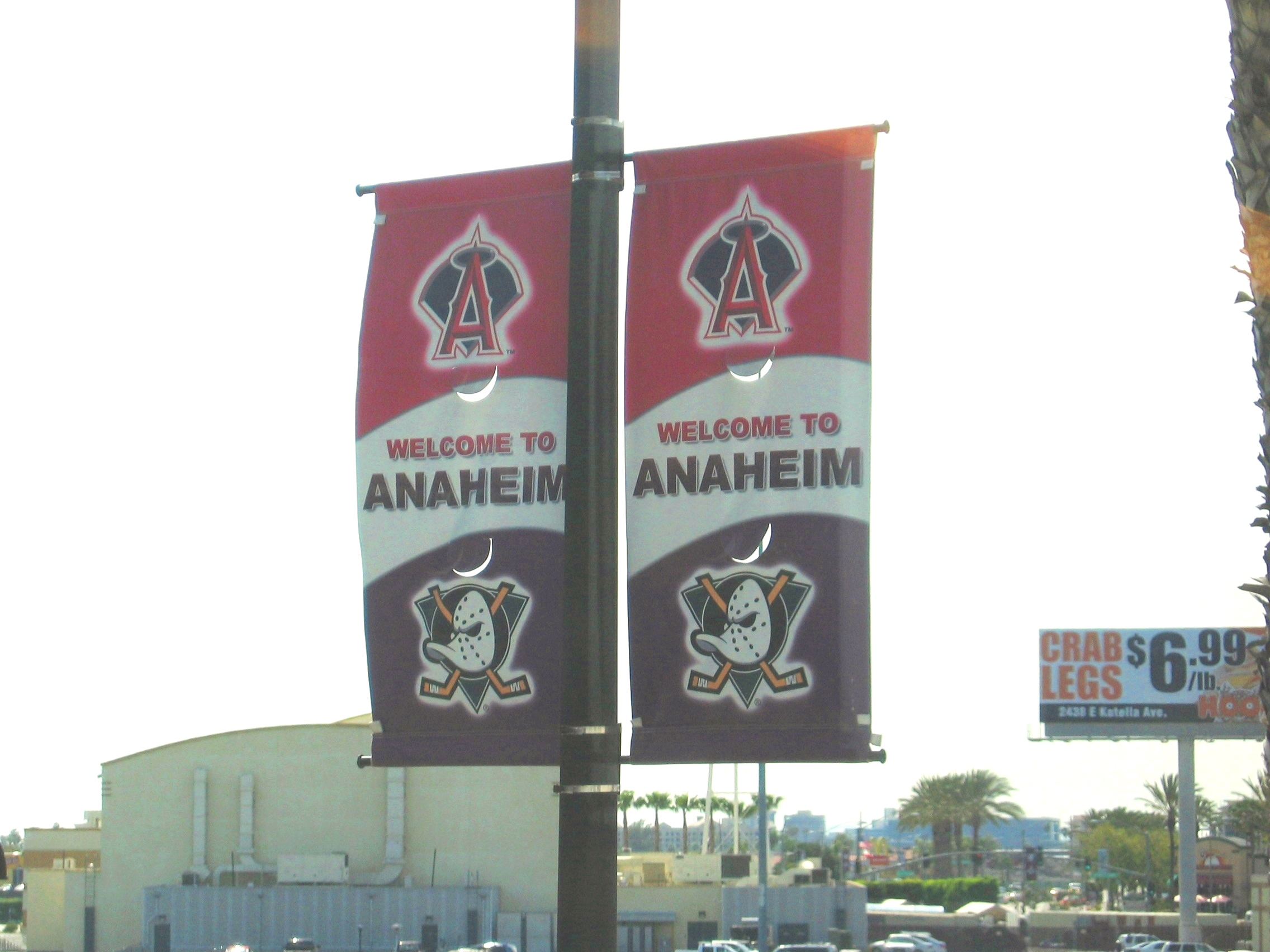
Street banners promoting the county's two major league teams, the Ducks and the Angels

The Major League Baseball team in Orange County is the Los Angeles Angels. The team won the World Series under manager Mike Scioscia in 2002. In 2005, new owner Arte Moreno wanted to change the name to "Los Angeles Angels" in order to better tap into the Los Angeles media market, the second largest in the country. However, the standing agreement with the city of Anaheim demanded that they have "Anaheim" in the name, so they became the Los Angeles Angels of Anaheim. This name change was hotly disputed by the city of Anaheim, but the change stood, which prompted a lawsuit by the city of Anaheim against Arte Moreno, won by the latter. Prior to the 2016 season Moreno officially dropped the Anaheim moniker, and the club is now simply called the Los Angeles Angels.

The county's National Hockey League team, the Anaheim Ducks, beat the Ottawa Senators to win the 2007 Stanley Cup. They also came close to winning the 2003 Stanley Cup, but lost in Game 7 of the finals against the New Jersey Devils.

The Toshiba Classic, the only PGA Champions Tour event in the area, is held each March at The Newport Beach Country Club. Past champions include Fred Couples (2010), Hale Irwin (1998 and 2002), Nick Price (2011), Bernhard Langer (2008) and Jay Haas (2007). The tournament benefits the Hoag Hospital Foundation and has raised over $16 million in its first 16 years.

Orange County SC is a United Soccer League team and are the only professional soccer club in Orange County. In 2011, the team's first season, the then-Los Angeles Blues made it to the quarter-finals of the playoffs under head coach Charlie Naimo. With home games played at Championship Soccer Stadium in Orange County Great Park, the team looks to grow in the Orange County community and reach continued success. Former and current Orange County SC players include Richard Chaplow, Bright Dike, Maykel Galindo, Carlos Borja, and goalkeeper Amir Abedzadeh.

Professional football made its debut in the Orange County area in 1960 when the Los Angeles Chargers of the American Football League held their inaugural training camp at Chapman University, then known as Chapman College. In 1966, the AFL considered expansion into the Southern California market and staged a doubleader exhibition at the newly-opened Anaheim Stadium. A year later, the National Football League's Los Angeles Rams began holding one preseason game at The Big A for the next three seasons before making a permanent move in time for the 1980 season. Though the team had some success, the Rams stayed in California for only 15 years before relocating to St. Louis in 1995. The Rams later returned to Los Angeles in 2016, but did not return to Orange County, playing home games in Los Angeles Memorial Coliseum from 2016 to 2019 and in SoFi Stadium from 2020 onwards.

The National Basketball Association's Los Angeles Clippers played some home games at The Arrowhead Pond, now known as the Honda Center, from 1994 to 1999, before moving to Staples Center (now Crypto.com Arena), which they shared with the Los Angeles Lakers. In 2011, a relocation bid was launched by the Sacramento Kings to move to Anaheim, but the effort was denied in a vote by the NBA Board of Governors and the franchise ultimately remained in Sacramento.

== Media ==
Orange County is served by media in Los Angeles, including its TV and radio stations. Two television stations—KOCE-TV, the main PBS member station in the Southland and KDOC-TV, a Tri-State Christian Television (TCT) owned-and-operated station—are located in Orange County.

There are a few radio stations that are actually located in Orange County. KYLA 92.7 FM has a Christian format. KSBR 88.5 FM airs a jazz music format branded as "Jazz-FM" along with news programming. KUCI 88.9 FM is a free form college radio station that broadcasts from UC Irvine. KWIZ 96.7 FM, located in Santa Ana, airs a regional Mexican music format branded as "La Rockola 96.7". KWVE-FM 107.9 is owned by the Calvary Chapel of Costa Mesa. KWVE-FM is also the primary Emergency Alert System station for the county. The Los Angeles Angels of Anaheim also own and operate a sports-only radio station from Orange, KLAA. KX 93.5 FM broadcasts out of Laguna Beach and features an eclectic mix of mostly alternative rock.

County-wide politics and government coverage is primarily provided by the Orange County Register and Voice of OC. OC Weekly was an alternative weekly publication, and Excélsior is a Spanish-language newspaper. A few communities are served by the Los Angeles Times' publication of the Daily Pilot. Orange Coast was established in 1974 and is the oldest continuously published lifestyle magazine in the region. OC Music Magazine is also based out of Orange County, serving local musicians and artists.

The Orange County Plain Dealer (January 1898 to May 8, 1925), was a mostly Anaheim-based newspaper, and successor to The Independent, bought by James E. Valjean, a Republican and edited by him, a former editor of the Portsmouth Blade (Ohio).

Other newspapers were: Anaheim Daily Herald, Anaheim Gazette, Anaheim Bulletin.

== Transportation ==
Transit in Orange County is offered primarily by the Orange County Transportation Authority (OCTA). OCTA manages the county's bus network and funds the construction and maintenance of local streets, highways, and freeways; regulates taxicab services; maintains express toll lanes through the median of California State Route 91; and works with Southern California's Metrolink to provide commuter rail service along three lines: the Orange County Line, the 91/Perris Valley Line, and the Inland Empire–Orange County Line, along with owning the land on which the Surf Line rests upon from the county line just north of Trestles Bridge until the wye adjacent to Fullerton Station.

=== Major highways ===
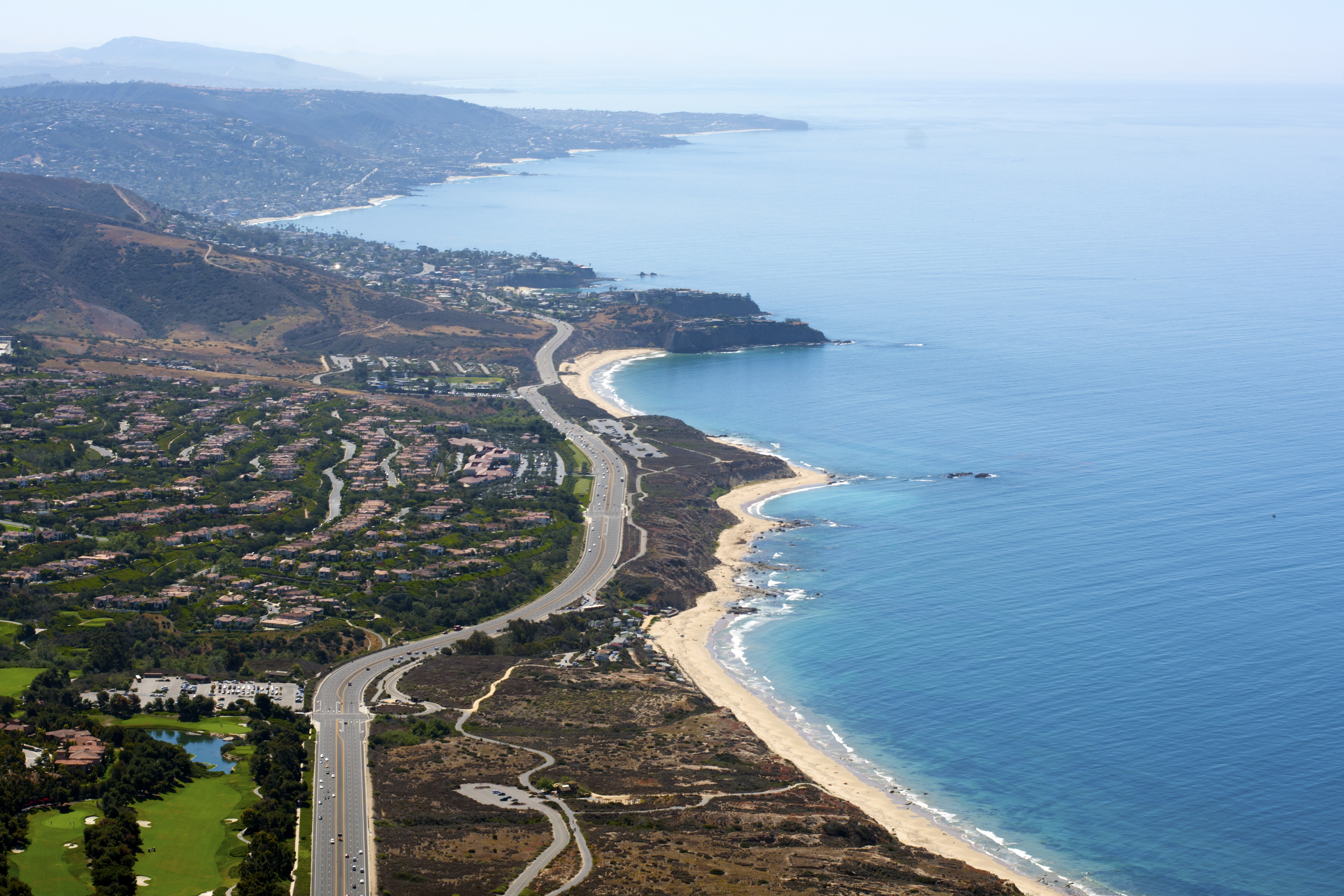
State Route 1 winds down the coast over Corona Del Mar State Beach.

Ground transportation in Orange County relies heavily on three major interstate highways: the Santa Ana Freeway (I-5), the San Diego Freeway (I-405 and I-5 south of Irvine), and the San Gabriel River Freeway (I-605), which briefly passes through northwestern Orange County. The other freeways in the county are state highways, and include the Riverside and Artesia Freeway (SR 91) and the Garden Grove Freeway (SR 22) running east–west, and the Orange Freeway (SR 57), the Costa Mesa Freeway (SR 55), the Laguna Freeway (SR 133), the San Joaquin Transportation Corridor (SR 73), the Eastern Transportation Corridor (SR 261, SR 133, SR 241), and the Foothill Transportation Corridor (SR 241) running north–south. Minor stub freeways include the Richard M. Nixon Freeway (SR 90), also known as Imperial Highway, and the southern terminus of Pacific Coast Highway (SR 1). There are no U.S. Highways in Orange County, though two existed in the county until the mid-1960s: 91 and 101. US 91 went through what is now the state route of the same number, and US 101 was replaced by Interstate 5. SR 1 was once a bypass of US 101 (Route 101A).

- Interstate 5
- Interstate 405
- Interstate 605
- U.S. Route 101 (decommissioned)
- State Route 1
- State Route 22
- State Route 39
- State Route 55
- State Route 57
- State Route 72
- State Route 73
- State Route 74
- State Route 90
- State Route 91
- State Route 133
- State Route 142
- State Route 241
- State Route 261

=== Bus ===
The bus network comprises 6,542 stops on 51 lines, running along most major streets, and accounts for 210,000 boardings a day. The fleet of 508 buses is gradually being replaced by CNG (Compressed natural gas)-powered vehicles and electric powered buses, which already represent over 70% of the total fleet. Service is operated by OCTA employees and First Transit under contract. OCTA operates four bus rapid transit service, Rapid, on Harbor Boulevard, Beach Boulevard, Main St and 17th/Westminister. In addition, OCTA offers paratransit service for the disabled (OC ACCESS), also operated by MV. OCTA offers OC flex for the rural areas of Orange County.

=== Rail ===
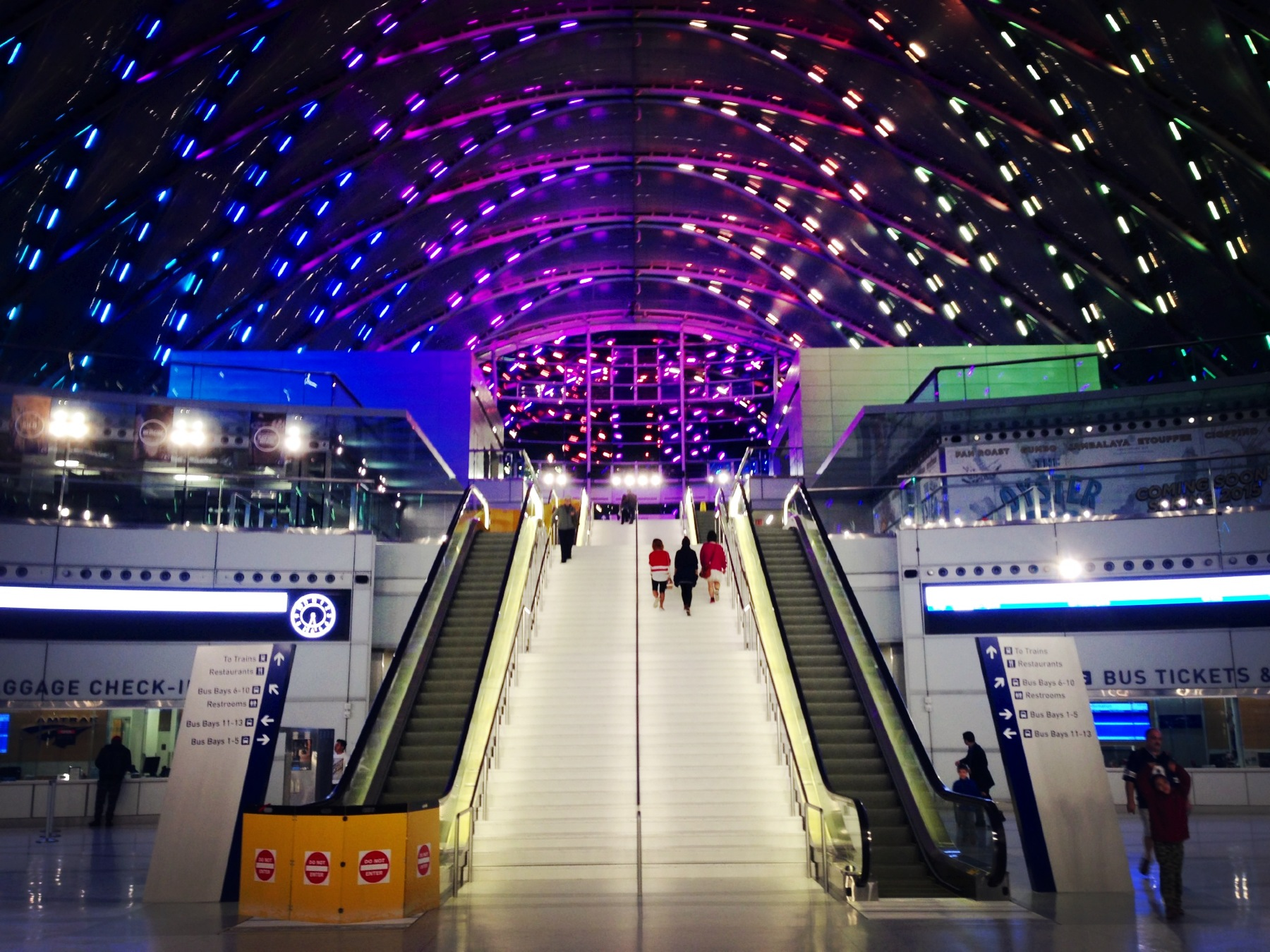
Anaheim Regional Transportation Intermodal Center (ARTIC)

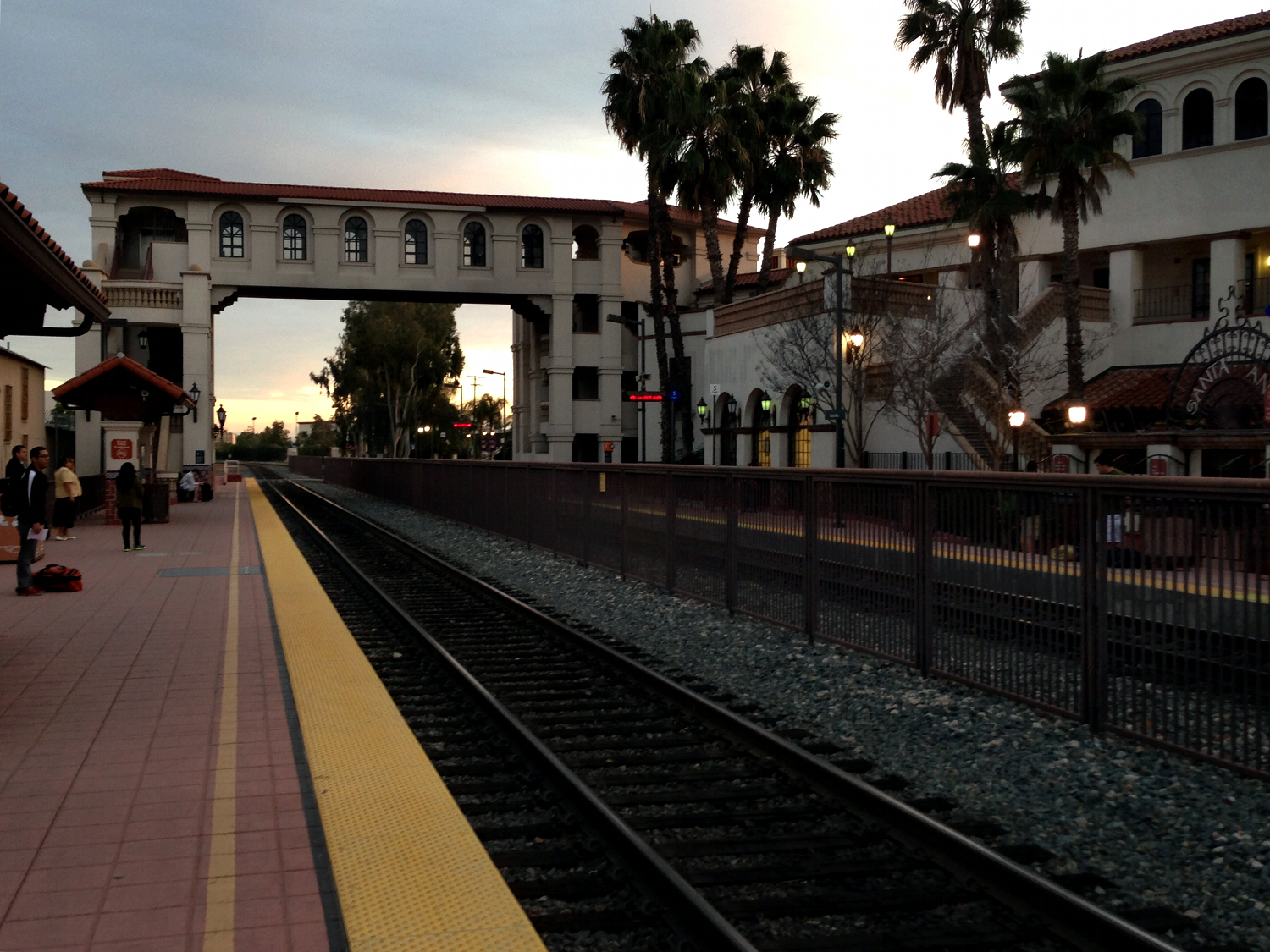
Santa Ana Regional Transportation Center

Since 1992, Metrolink has operated three commuter rail lines through Orange County, and has also maintained Rail-to-Rail service with parallel Amtrak service. On a typical weekday, over 40 trains run along the Orange County Line, the 91/Perris Valley Line and the Inland Empire–Orange County Line. Along with Metrolink riders on parallel Amtrak lines, these lines generate approximately 15,000 boardings per weekday. Metrolink also began offering weekend service on the Orange County Line and the Inland Empire-Orange County line in the summer of 2006. As ridership has steadily increased in the region, new stations have opened at Anaheim Canyon, Buena Park, Tustin, and Laguna Niguel/Mission Viejo. Plans for a future station in Placentia are underway and is expected to be completed by 2020.

Since 1938, the Atchison, Topeka, and Santa Fe Railroad and later Amtrak, has operated the Pacific Surfliner regional passenger train route (previously named the San Diegan until 2000) through Orange County. The route includes stops at eight stations in Orange County including, in northbound order, San Clemente Pier (selected trips), San Juan Capistrano, Laguna Niguel/Mission Viejo (formerly), Irvine Transportation Center, Santa Ana Regional Transportation Center, Orange (formerly), Anaheim Regional Transportation Intermodal Center (ARTIC), and Fullerton Transportation Center.

OC Streetcar, formerly known as the Santa Ana/Garden Grove Fixed Guideway Project, is a streetcar line connecting Downtown Santa Ana to the Depot at Santa Ana which is currently under construction and expected to open in 2026. OCTA has also proposed connecting the two systems via Harbor Boulevard and the West Santa Ana Branch corridor. Plans for a streetcar for Harbor Boulevard in Fullerton, Anaheim, and Garden Grove — the Anaheim Rapid Connection — were shelved in 2018.

=== Sea ===
A car and passenger ferry service, the Balboa Island Ferry, comprising three ferries running every five minutes, operates within Newport Harbor between Balboa Peninsula and Balboa Island in Newport Beach. The Catalina Flyer connects the Balboa Peninsula to Avalon with daily round-trip passage through about nine months of the year. The Catalina Express connects Dana Point to Avalon (with departures from two greater Long Beach ports also connecting to Two Harbors).

=== Air ===
Orange County's only major airport is John Wayne Airport; its abbreviation (SNA) refers to Santa Ana, the closest large town in the early 20th century. The airport is located in unincorporated territory surrounded by Newport Beach, Costa Mesa, and Irvine. On destination monitors with flights to SNA, the airport is usually described as "Orange County, CA" or "Santa Ana/Orange County". In 2014, its Thomas F. Riley Terminal handled over 9 million passengers annually and as of 2019, seven airline brands provide scheduled service. Los Angeles International Airport, is frequently used by Orange County residents which provides more domestic and international destinations.

== Communities ==
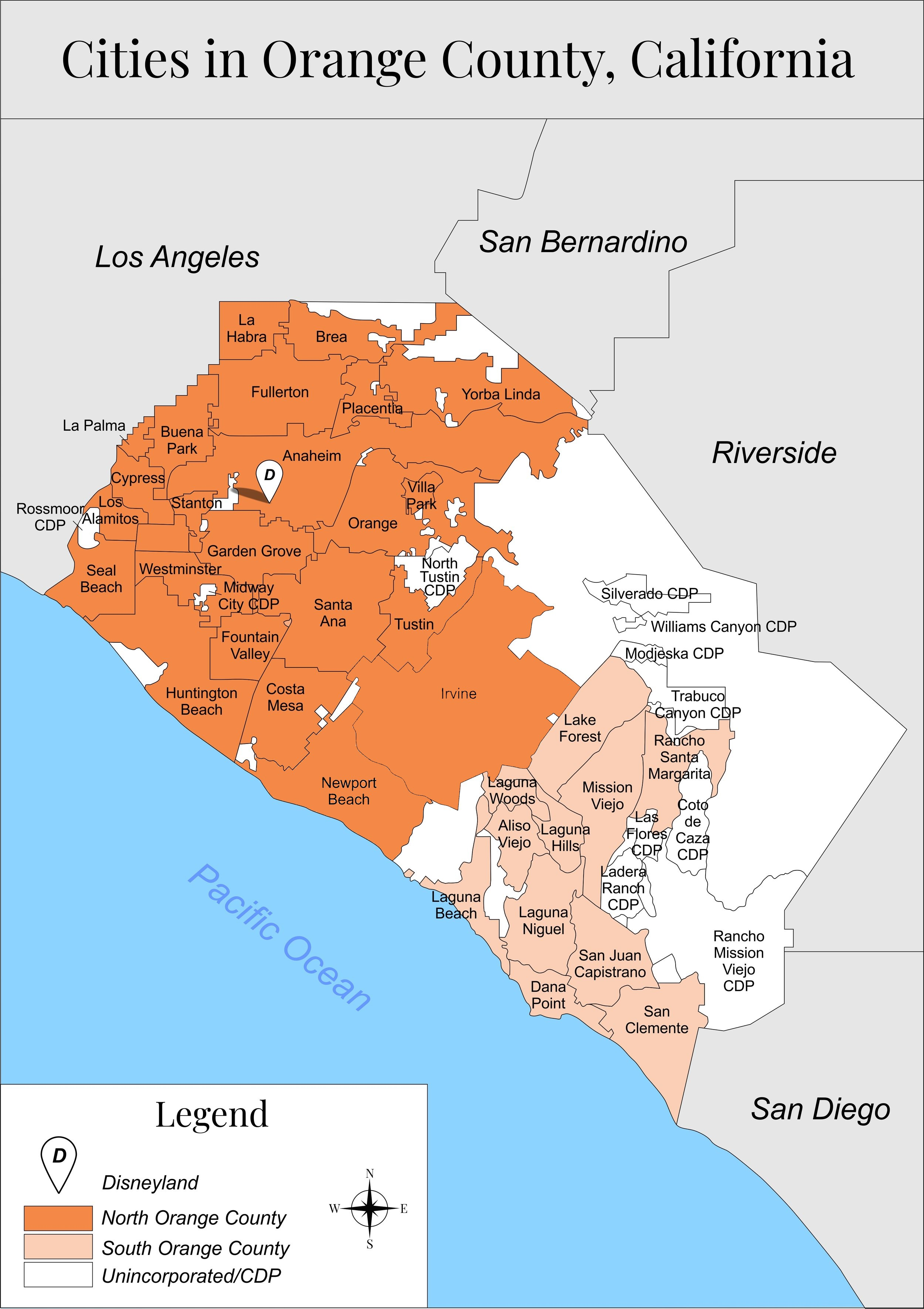
Map of Orange County Cities and CDPs

=== Cities ===
- Aliso Viejo
- Anaheim
- Brea
- Buena Park
- Costa Mesa
- Cypress
- Dana Point
- Fountain Valley
- Fullerton
- Garden Grove
- Huntington Beach
- Irvine
- La Habra
- La Palma
- Laguna Beach
- Laguna Hills
- Laguna Niguel
- Laguna Woods
- Lake Forest
- Los Alamitos
- Mission Viejo
- Newport Beach
- Orange
- Placentia
- Rancho Santa Margarita
- San Clemente
- San Juan Capistrano
- Santa Ana (county seat)
- Seal Beach
- Stanton
- Tustin
- Villa Park
- Westminster
- Yorba Linda

=== Unincorporated communities ===
These communities are outside city limits in unincorporated county territory.

- Anaheim Island
- Coto de Caza CDP (Note: For statistical purposes in 2020 Census, defined by the United States Census Bureau as a census-designated place (CDP).)
- El Modena CDP (added in 2024)
- Emerald Bay
- Ladera Ranch CDP
- Las Flores CDP
- Midway City CDP
- Modjeska CDP
- North Tustin CDP
  - Cowan Heights
  - Lemon Heights
  - Panorama Heights
- Olive
- Orange Park Acres CDP (added in 2024)
- Rancho Mission Viejo CDP
- Rossmoor CDP
- Santiago Canyon
- Silverado CDP
- Trabuco Canyon CDP
- Williams Canyon CDP

=== Planned communities ===
Orange County has a history of large planned communities. Nearly 30 percent of the county was created as master planned communities, the most notable being the City of Irvine, Coto de Caza, Anaheim Hills, Tustin Ranch, Tustin Legacy, Ladera Ranch, Talega, Rancho Santa Margarita, and Mission Viejo. Irvine is often referred to as a model master-planned city because its original seven villages (College Park, The Colony, The Ranch, Culverdale, The Racquet Club, University Park, and Turtle Rock) were laid out by the Irvine Company of the mid-1960s before it was bought by a group of investors including Donald Bren.

== In culture ==
Orange County has been the setting for numerous written works and motion pictures, as well as a popular location for shooting motion pictures.

The city of San Juan Capistrano is where writer Johnston McCulley set the first novella about Zorro, The Curse of Capistrano. It was published in 1919 and later renamed The Mark of Zorro. Science fiction novels set in Orange County include A Scanner Darkly (1977) by Philip K. Dick and the Three Californias trilogy by Kim Stanley Robinson (1984–1990). Many novels by suspense thriller writer Dean Koontz are set in Orange County; Koontz is a resident of Newport Beach.

Orange County was featured by Huell Howser in Road Trip Episode 109.

Popular television series set in Orange County include the Fox drama The O.C. (2003–2007), the Fox sitcom Arrested Development (2003–2006), and the Bravo reality show The Real Housewives of Orange County (2006–present). The three programs share a common focus on the extravagant lifestyles of the county's upper class.

== See also ==
- List of museums in Orange County, California
- List of people from Orange County, California
- National Register of Historic Places listings in Orange County, California
- Orange County (film)
- Orange County Fair (California)
- Orange County School of the Arts
- Santiago Library System
