= Williams Canyon, California =

- Unincorporated community Census-designated place
- Location within California Location within the United States
- Coordinates: 33°43′44″N 117°38′21″W
- Country: United States
- State: California
- County: Orange

Area
  - Total: 0.57 sq mi (1.47 km^{2})
  - Land: 0.57 sq mi (1.47 km^{2})
  - Water: 0 sq mi (0.0 km^{2})
- Elevation: 1,220 ft (370 m)
- Time zone: UTC-8 (Pacific (PST))
  - Summer (DST): UTC-7 (PDT)
- ZIP Code: 92676 (Silverado)
- Area code: 949
- FIPS code: 06-85587
- GNIS feature ID: 2812659

Williams Canyon is an unincorporated community and census-designated place (CDP) in the canyon of the same name in Orange County, California, United States. It is located in eastern Orange County on the western side of the Santa Ana Mountains, south of Silverado and north of Modjeska. Most of the community is within Cleveland National Forest. As of the 2020 census, Williams Canyon had a population of 93.

== Demographics ==
Historical population
Census	Pop.	Note	%±
2020	93		—
U.S. Decennial Census; 2020

For statistical purposes, the United States Census Bureau first listed Williams Canyon as a census-designated place (CDP) in the 2020 census.

=== 2020 census ===
Williams Canyon CDP, California - Demographic Profile Note: the US Census treats Hispanic/Latino as an ethnic category. This table excludes Latinos from the racial categories and assigns them to a separate category. Hispanics/Latinos may be of any race.
Race / Ethnicity (NH = Non-Hispanic)	Pop 2020	% 2020
White alone (NH)	70	75.27%
Black or African American alone (NH)	0	0.00%
Native American or Alaska Native alone (NH)	0	0.00%
Asian alone (NH)	1	1.08%
Native Hawaiian or Pacific Islander alone (NH)	0	0.00%
Other race alone (NH)	0	0.00%
Mixed race or Multiracial (NH)	2	2.15%
Hispanic or Latino (any race)	20	21.51%
Total	93	100.00%
