= Orange Coast =

Area in the Pacific Coast in Orange County, California

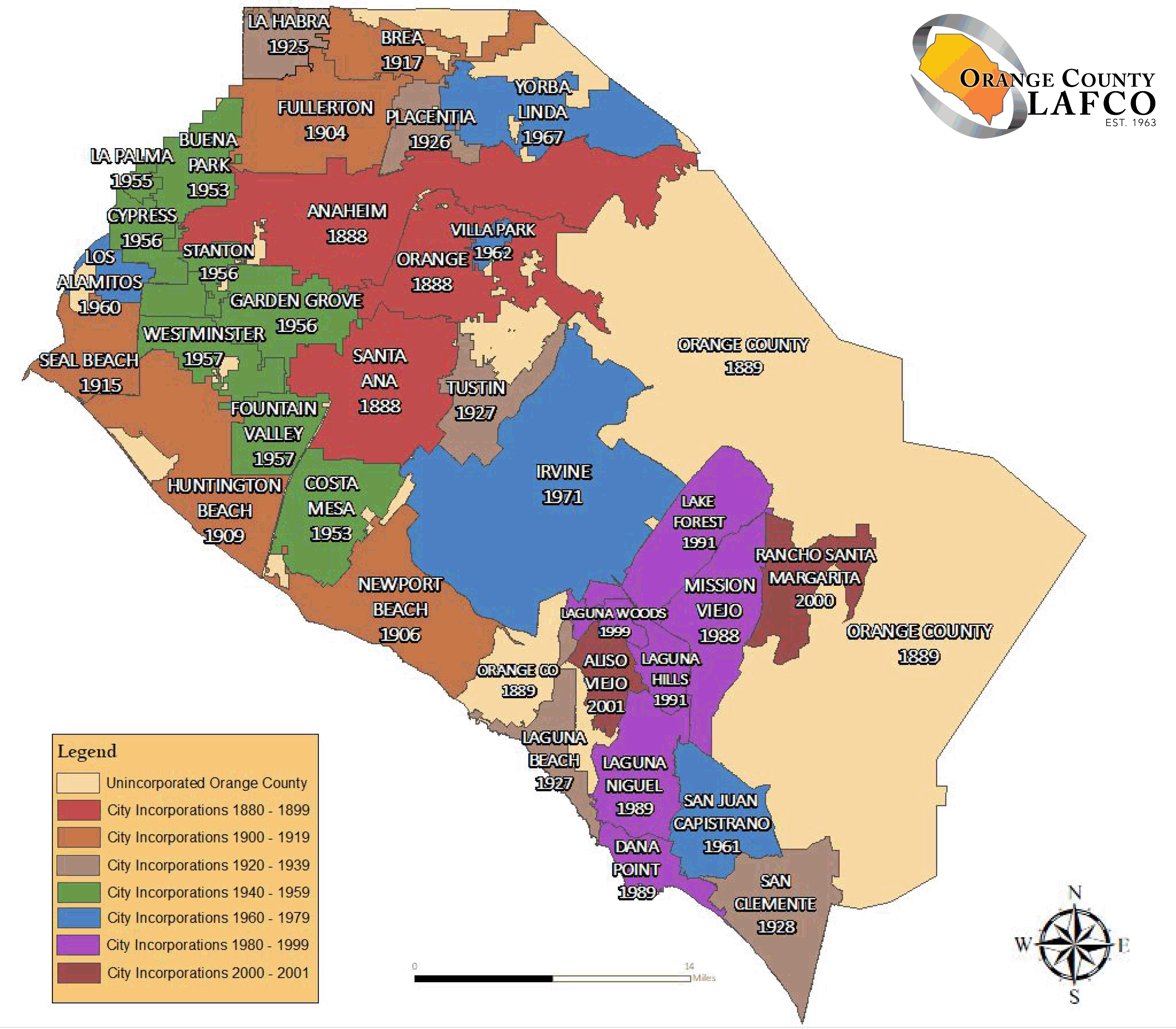
Cities of Orange County

The Orange Coast is the string of cities and neighborhoods fronting the Pacific Coast in Orange County, California. From northwest to southeast, these cities are Seal Beach, Huntington Beach, Newport Beach, Laguna Beach, Dana Point and San Clemente. There are also two small unincorporated areas, a portion of Crystal Cove State Park between Newport Beach and Laguna Beach and Emerald Bay, a gated community located between two neighborhoods of Laguna Beach.

Specific neighborhoods associated with the "Orange Coast" moniker include Surfside (Seal Beach), Sunset Beach (Huntington Beach), Balboa Island (Newport Beach), Balboa Peninsula (Newport Beach), Corona del Mar (Newport Beach), Newport Coast (Newport Beach), South Laguna (Laguna Beach), Monarch Beach (Dana Point) and Capistrano Beach (Dana Point). Seal Beach and Huntington beach are considered to belong to North Orange County, while Newport Beach and the cities to its south are considered part of South Orange County.

The term South Coast is often used synonymously for the coastal communities south of Long Beach (although there exist many other definitions and common uses of South Coast). Many local businesses and institutions have adopted these names, such as Orange Coast College, the Orange Coast Daily Pilot, South Coast Repertory and South Coast Plaza (all based in Costa Mesa). The term "beach cities" is also used.
