= Emerald Bay, Orange County, California =

Unincorporated community in California, United States

Emerald Bay
- Unincorporated community
- Location in California Emerald Bay (the United States) Emerald Bay (the Los Angeles metropolitan area)
- Coordinates: 33.5524711°N 117.8178812°W
- Country: United States
- State: California
- County: Orange County
- Elevation: 79 ft (24 m)

Emerald Bay (EM-ruhd) is an unincorporated community in Orange County, California, United States. It borders the city of Laguna Beach to the northwest and southeast, Crystal Cove State Park to the northeast, and the Pacific Ocean to the south.

Emerald Bay is a gated community bisected by California State Route 1. There are approximately 538 homes in the community. Emerald Bay beach purports to be a private beach accessible only to residents of the gated community. The only entrance to Emerald Bay is on the north side of State Route 1; access to the southern portion is provided by a tunnel which runs under the highway. The community has its own fire station.

The only portion of Laguna Beach located west of Emerald Bay is Irvine Cove, which is another gated community with a "private" beach. Unlike Emerald Bay, however, Irvine Cove is within the city limits of Laguna Beach.

Emerald Bay is one of two unincorporated areas on the coast of Orange County, the other being a portion of Crystal Cove State Park located between Newport Beach and Laguna Beach. It is the only unincorporated populated place on the county's coastline.

== See also ==
- Orange Coast
