= Verano =

Verano may refer to:

- Verano (Neighborhood), a neighborhood in Talega, California
- Verano, Italy, or Vöran, a comune in South Tyrol, Italy
- Verano Brianza, a municipality in the province of Milan, Italy
- Verano (surname), a surname (including a list of people with the name)
- Verano (film), or Summer, a 2011 Chilean film
- Operation Verano, a 1958 offensive against revolutionaries in Cuba
- "Verano", a song by Natalia LaFourcade from Las 4 Estaciones del Amor
- "Verano", a song by La Oreja de Van Gogh from El planeta imaginario
- Buick Verano, a four-door, five passenger sedan sold by Buick in North America
- Campo Verano, a cemetery in Rome, Italy that was founded in the early nineteenth century
