= Verano (surname) =

Verano is a surname of Basque origin.

== Meaning ==
As a word it means "summer" in the Spanish language but as a family name in the Basque language is "a habitational name from a town in Biscay province, Basque Country in Spain."

== Origin ==
It usually applies to the descendants of the Verano family, an old basque noble family originally from Biscay province in Basque Country. It's also connected to two important Italian cities, Camerino and Ferrara, The surname Verano has been found in Camerino from as early as the 13th–16th centuries, first with the title of Vicars of the Holy See. The term Verano may have originated from the Basque "Berano", a name which is popular and common among the residents of those who lived in a town within Biscay Country. A bishop has even been cited from there in 1482.

The surname Verano is distributed between Verano's family in some countries such Spain (The former Spanish colonies) in the Philippines where substantial numbers of Basques emigrated to, including United States, France, Italy, Malta, and Mexico. In the United States of America, one of the first Veranos to be recorded on fresh immigration records were from Italy and Hawaii. However, since they possessed Italian and Spanish names, it can be concluded that they were descendants of those Spaniards or Europeans who landed on the shores Oceania when there was Colonialism in the islands. There are about 9,102 Documents about Verano Ancestry, 7,223 Birth, Marriage and Deaths and 665 Immigration Records in the USA.

== People ==
=== In the United States ===
- John Verano, associate professor of Anthropology at Tulane University in New Orleans, Louisiana, US.
- Juhn Verano, Vice President of FANHS, (Filipino American National Historical Society, Vallejo City, California, US).
- Luis Verano, emeritus Senior Instructor of Spanish, University of Oregon, US.
- Nick Verano, Entrepreneur and Restaurateur in Boston, Massachusetts.
- Nestor Dante Verano, First Certified Nephrology Nurse Practitioner in Chicago

=== In the Philippines ===
- Don Lorenzo Verano, he was the official Chief Constable of Tagbilaran in (1742).
- Don Leon Verano, Don of Batac. The Tension between U.S. & Philippines & The Revolution.
- Andres Verano, he was one of Anas barangay establishers in Masbate City (1880).
- Lorenzo Verano, he was one of Anas barangay establishers in Masbate City (1880).
- The first lieutenant: Bernaldo Verano, one of B.Titong leaders in Masbate City (1890), he was followed by Eulogio Verano, Isidro Verano, Felipe Verano and Mario Verano.
- Hermogenes Verano, he was one of Cawayan establishers and was one of the first exteriors from Masbate City (1900).
- Regacio Verano, he was one of Cawayan establishers and was one of the first exteriors from Masbate City (1900).
- Senator Felisberto Verano, Senator of Surigao and Elected as Vice President of the Philippines, (1949–1953), "2nd Congress".
- Congresswoman then Senator Lorna Verano Yap, Representative of Pasay, (Legislative district of Pasay), "The 8th Congress of the Philippines" (1987–1992).
- Mrs. Luz Verano Mercado, first lady of Southern Leyte province in the Philippines, wife of Governor (Roger Gaviola Mercado), Congressman & Representative of Southern Leyte.
- Hon. Myrna L Verano, Judge in Supreme Court of the Philippines & member of International Association of Women Judges (IAWJ).
- Leopoldo G. Verano, Head of Tudela Municipal Department.
- Dr. Benjamin Alesna Verano, Vice Mayor of Valencia City since (2010).
- Marnelle Verano, Athletic, WFC, Weltrangliste Female Boxing, "Flyweight".
- Erika Verano, a Volleyball player. See Shakey's V-League.
- Macelinda Diaz Verano, Religious Essayist. (Roman Catholic).
- Mr. Felisberto Verano Jr, businessman, Official Representative of Southeast Asian Placement INC. Philippine Overseas Employment Administration (POEA).
- Renz Verano, Filipino musician.
- Crismel F Verano, businessman, he is a chairman & the board executive committee member of Philippine National Oil Company (PNOC) and member of committee of Audit and Welfare committee, & chairman of the board of Cirtek Electronics Inc & Dominos Pizzatek Inc & 9-mile Habital Development Corporation & chairman and president of Republic Steel Tube Inc, & vice president of Foremost Asphalt Corporation & consultant to DSG & Sons group Companies. He was a consultant to DHL Philippines Corp.
- Kristoffer Joshua L. Verano, personal chef from Cebu, Cooking Style: Filipino cuisine, Chinese cuisine, and eclectic.

=== In Colombia ===
- Eduardo Verano de la Rosa, politician, businessman, and active member of the Colombian Liberal Party. He was the 4th Minister of Environment in Colombia (Ministry of Environment). On 28 October 2007 he was elected as the 39th Governor of Atlántico. (He belongs also to the De La Rosa family).

=== In Argentina ===
- Dr. Alfredo Fernández Verano, Author.

=== In Brazil ===
- Luis Verano, the 39th mayor of Belo Horizonte city in Brazil. (1975 to 1979). (See: List of mayors of Belo Horizonte city, Brazil).

=== In Spain and Gibraltar ===
- Miguel Escalona Verano, a Spanish professional footballer.
- Captain. Adolphus Charles Verano, (He was an Anglo-Italian of Gibraltan birth), he was born (1898) in Gibraltar, he was the skipper of the British ship "Endymion" during the Spanish Civil War which torpedoed and sunk in 1938 by a suspected Nationalist submarine of Spain, Adolphus was one of 11 killed. His father Dr. Louis Verano, his grandson was elected as a vice president of Gibraltar, the family name Verano has been shortened to Andlaw & Louis.

== See also ==
- Verano (disambiguation)
- Basque surnames
- Basque people
