= Talega, San Clemente, California =

Coordinates: 33.464°N 117.589°W

Talega is a tract housing project in the city of San Clemente in Orange County, California. It is a planned community, and construction began in 1999.

== Geography ==
Talega is located about 3 miles (4.8 km) from the California coast and 2 miles (3.2 km) east of Interstate 5 in California, between the streets of Avenida Pico and Camino De Los Mares. It is near the Northrop Grumman Capistrano Test Site (formerly TRW Inc.), where the lunar module descent engines were developed in the 1960s for the Apollo 11 Moon landing. It is about 8 miles (13 km) from the San Onofre Nuclear Generating Station and near the Marine Corps Base Camp Pendleton.

== Facilities ==
There is a shopping center which includes Ralphs, a Target, Barnoa Wine Company, Walmart, a golf course and one K-8 elementary school/middle school, named Vista Del Mar. Capistrano Unified School District serves it and was recently annexed to San Clemente from the unincorporated territories in which it existed at the beginning of construction.

City maintained parks include Talega Park, Liberty Park, and Tierra Grande Park. Talega HOA maintained parks include Altea Park, Pacifica Summit Park, Portofino Park, Sansol/Mirador Park, and Lucia Park.

== Neighborhoods ==
Talega is home to 9,000 residents and, when completed, will have a total of 3,500 residential units. Most are tract houses, with apartments, and condos all sharing the same master pools and facilities. There are no full-custom homes. The community has a predominant Spanish-Tuscan architecture, which is evident in almost every house, as well as in all the public spaces and buildings within the community.

It consists of over 30 neighborhoods, which are mostly single-family homes, some condominiums, and a few apartments. The Talega Specific Plan area encompasses a total of 3,510 acres (14.2 km^{2}) in the Northeastern portion of the city. The major streets within the Talega Specific Plan are Avenida Pico, Camino La Pedriza, Avenida Vista Hermosa, and Avenida Talega.

In the southeastern part of Talega is an area called The Talega Gallery for residents over 55 years old.

== History ==
In December 2007, the Southern California Multiple Listing Service relocated Talega from San Clemente and designated it as its city.

Due to its location in the hills, Talega faced several transportation issues. As of March 2009, there were only two main roads out of the community. There was a proposed extension of La Pata that would bridge the 1.5-mile gap between Talega and the point where the road currently ends in San Juan Capistrano. The Orange County Master Plan placed the location of this extension close to some homes in Talega. A suggestion to relocate the route to a path halfway between Talega and the adjacent Forester Ranch community would have involved relocating power lines and would be the most expensive option. Construction started in 2014 and was to be completed in the fall of 2016.
