= Orange County Transportation Authority =

Transportation planning commission for Orange County, California

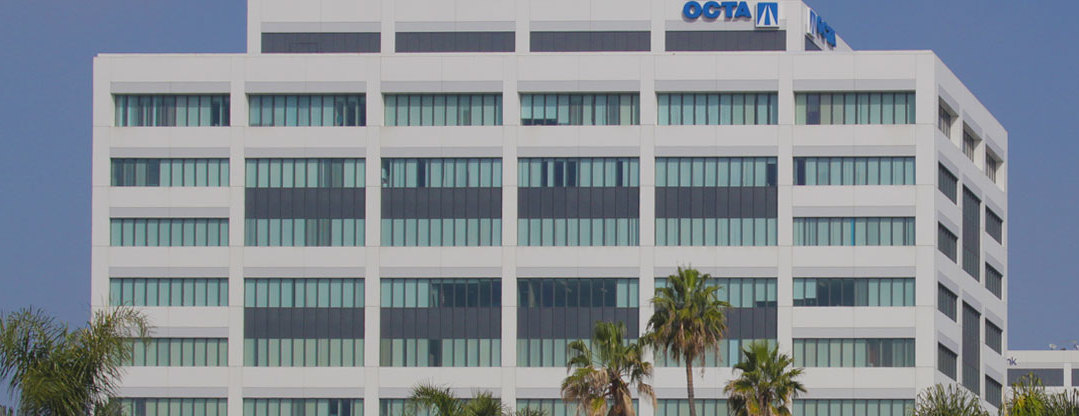
- Headquarters in Orange, California

Commission overview
- Formed: 1991
- Jurisdiction: Orange County, California
- Headquarters: 550 S Main Street, Orange, California
- Employees: 1,378 (2021)
- Annual budget: US$1.3 billion (FY 2021–22)
- Commission executives: Darrell E. Johnson, CEO; Jennifer L. Bergener, Deputy CEO and COO
- Website: octa.net

The Orange County Transportation Authority (OCTA) is the state agency responsible for operating most public transportation, in Orange County, California, which is in the Los Angeles metropolitan area. OCTA is also responsible for funding and implementing transit and capital projects for the transportation system in the county, including freeway expansions, express lane management, bus and rail transit operation, and commuter rail funding and oversight. The agency is a separate state level agency and is not a part of or controlled by the Orange County government.

OCTA was founded in 1991 through the consolidation of seven separate transportation agencies by the California State Legislature and is governed by a 17-member Board of Directors with the Caltrans District Director serving in a non-voting capacity. The Transit Authority's administrative offices are located in Orange, California.

== History ==
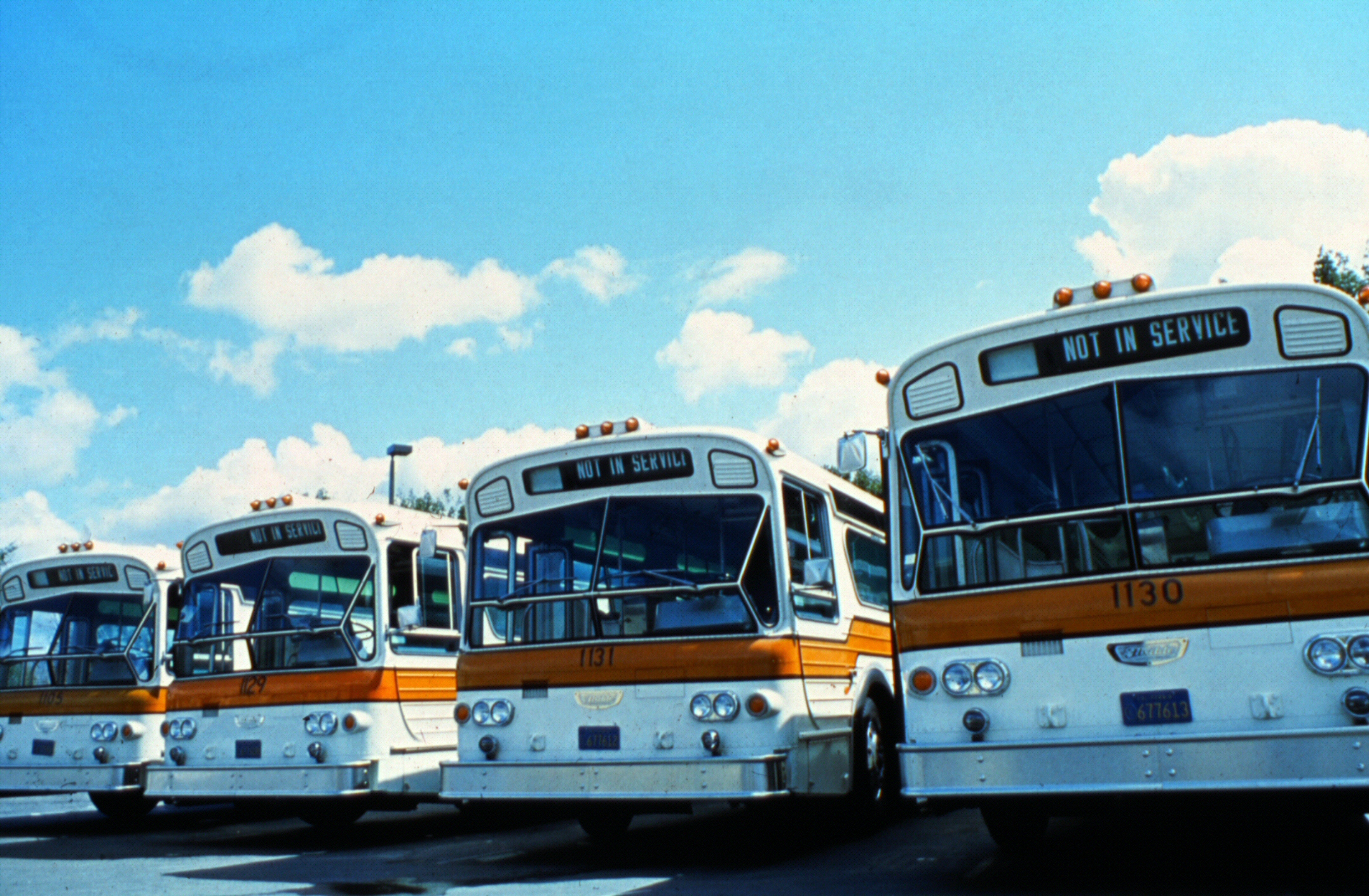
OCTD buses in the 1980s

OCTA's predecessor agency, the Orange County Transit District, was created in August 1972 by a referendum of county voters. It originally started as Santa Ana Transit, a small transit agency with five bus routes operating in Orange County. Santa Ana Transit later merged with other, smaller agencies throughout the county, eventually leading to the formation of OCTD. The routing system was formed over the course of about 15 years and was held in place until the formation of OCTA.

In 1991, OCTA was created under state law, combining the seven separate Orange County agencies that managed transportation planning: Orange County Transportation Commission, Orange County Transit District, Consolidated Transportation Services Agency, Orange County Local Transportation Authority, Orange County Service Authority for Freeway Emergencies, Orange County Congestion Management Agency, and Orange County Service Authority for Abandoned Vehicles.

Park-and-ride facilities, public transportation and other transportation related administrative offices merged into one organization. OCTA administers funds from Measure M (also known as OC Go), a half-cent transportation sales tax. Measure M was originally passed in 1990 and renewed in 2006. It has paid for the expansion on most freeways within Orange County, street improvements and repairs, traffic signal synchronization, and increased Metrolink service.

In 1995, OCTA suffered tremendously during the Orange County bankruptcy and never fully recovered. The agency lost $202 million in revenue over 17 years due to the bankruptcy. As a result, bus service was reduced.

In October 2015, OCTA rebranded its bus services as "OC Bus" and launched the OC Bus 360° plan, which aims to consolidate routes into more frequent service and increase ridership. OCTA also plans to replace 40% of its bus fleet with compressed natural gas-powered vehicles. The change was approved by the OCTA board on February 22, 2016.

In January 2022, OCTA debuted battery-electric buses. The agency operates both battery electric buses and fuel cell buses, and is converting their fleet in alignment with the California Air Resources Board's Innovative Clean Transit rule.

In October 2025, OC Wave card was released to the public, which includes fare capping of $4.50 for a day and $69 for a month.

== Bus operations ==
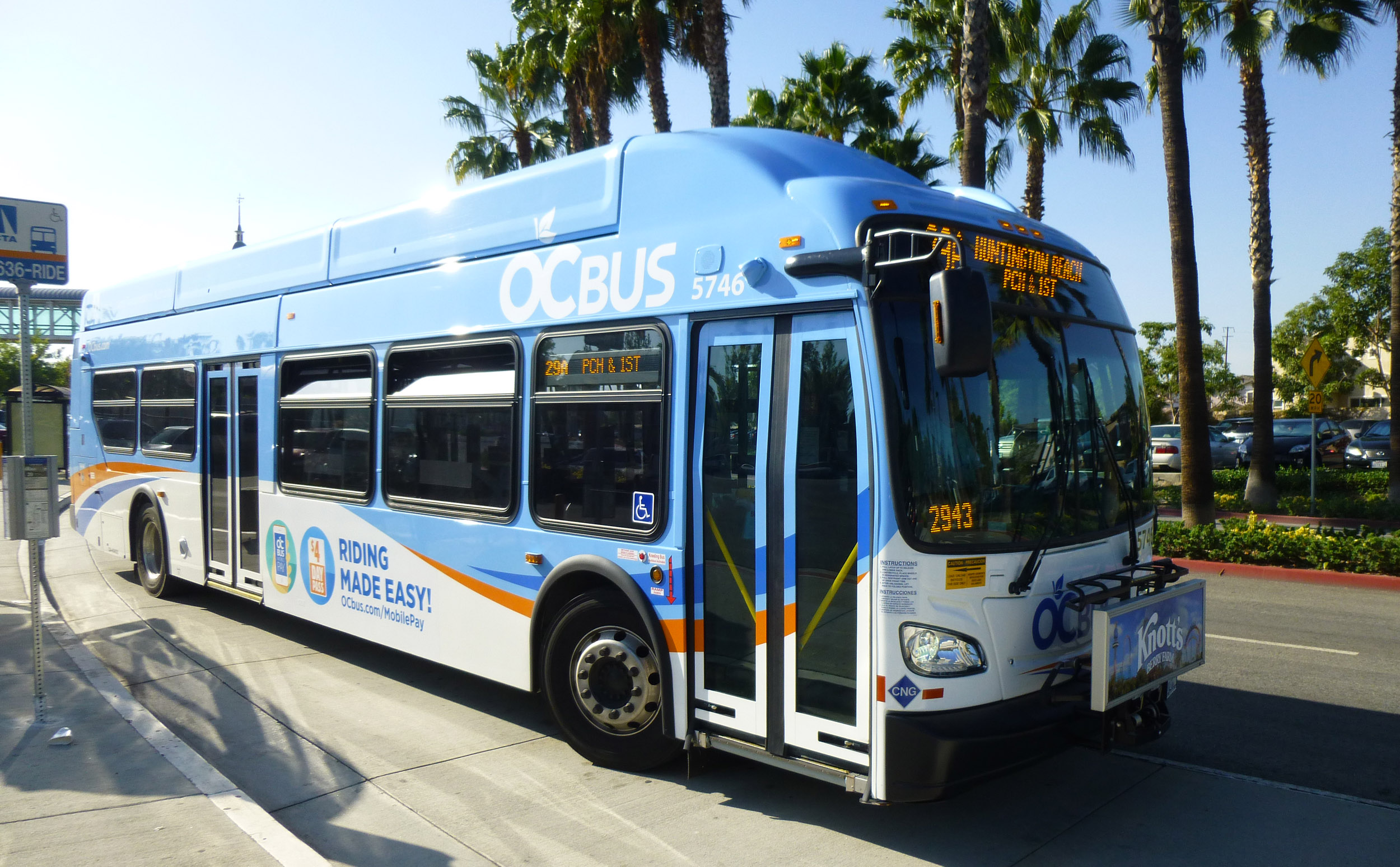
OC Bus on Route 29A at Buena Park station

OCTA operates 52 bus routes under the OC Bus brand, encompassing every city in Orange County. Some of the lines also extend to serve the Los Angeles County border communities of Artesia, Lakewood, La Mirada, Cerritos, Hawaiian Gardens and Long Beach.

The longest is route 1 (Long Beach–San Clemente) which utilizes Pacific Coast Highway (State Route 1) for the vast majority of its 40-mile (64 km) route, with trips taking an average of 2 to 2.5 hours. South Coast Plaza is the most served location with six OC Bus routes (55, 57, 86, 150, 151, and Rapid 553).

== Rail operations ==
=== Commuter rail ===
The OCTA began funding rail operations with the Orange County Commuter, which Amtrak started operating in early 1990 running between Los Angeles Union Station and San Juan Capistrano with stops in Commerce, Fullerton, Anaheim, Orange, Santa Ana and Irvine. After being tasked by the California Senate to create a joint commuter rail program with other local authorities, the OCTA became a founding member of the Southern California Regional Rail Authority, which later adopted the brand name Metrolink.

The Orange County Commuter was subsequently transferred to Metrolink, becoming the Orange County Line. With the Metrolink takeover in 1994, the southern terminus moved to Oceanside and five infill stations were added: San Clemente and Norwalk/Santa Fe Springs in 1995, Tustin and Laguna Niguel/Mission Viejo in 2002, and Buena Park in 2007. Starting in 2005, OCTA has funded greatly expanded service on the Orange County Line, with trains now running twenty hours daily, seven days a week, as often as every 30 minutes. Additional platforms were added at the Fullerton and Laguna Niguel/Mission Viejo stations to accommodate the additional trains.

Metrolink's Inland Empire–Orange County Line began operations in October 1995 between Riverside and Irvine; it was the first suburb-to-suburb commuter rail in the U.S. at the time. The line was later extended and now operates between San Bernardino and Oceanside.

Metrolink also added a third line through Orange County on May 6, 2002, the 91 Line, later renamed the 91/Perris Valley Line. The service initially operated between Los Angeles Union Station and Riverside–Downtown station via Buena Park, Fullerton, and Corona, roughly paralleling part of the route of the namesake California State Route 91. Limited weekend service began in July 2014. On June 6, 2016, service was extended beyond Riverside to Moreno Valley and Perris–South station in Perris.

=== OC Streetcar ===
Starting in 2015, OCTA was collaborating with the cities of Santa Ana and Garden Grove to build the OC Streetcar, a 4.15-mile (6.68 km), 12-station light rail line along Santa Ana Boulevard and 4th Street in the two cities, using portions of the West Santa Ana Branch of the old Pacific Electric right-of-way. The western terminus of the route follows the Pacific Electric right-of-way near the intersection of Harbor Boulevard and Westminster Avenue in Garden Grove, then along street running track on Santa Ana Boulevard into Downtown Santa Ana, where it would reach the Santa Ana Regional Transportation Center at its eastern terminus. In February 2016, $125 million towards the project was included in the proposed United States federal budget for the 2016-17 fiscal year. OCTA began construction in 2018 and is projecting to open the project in 2026.

=== Cancelled CenterLine light rail ===
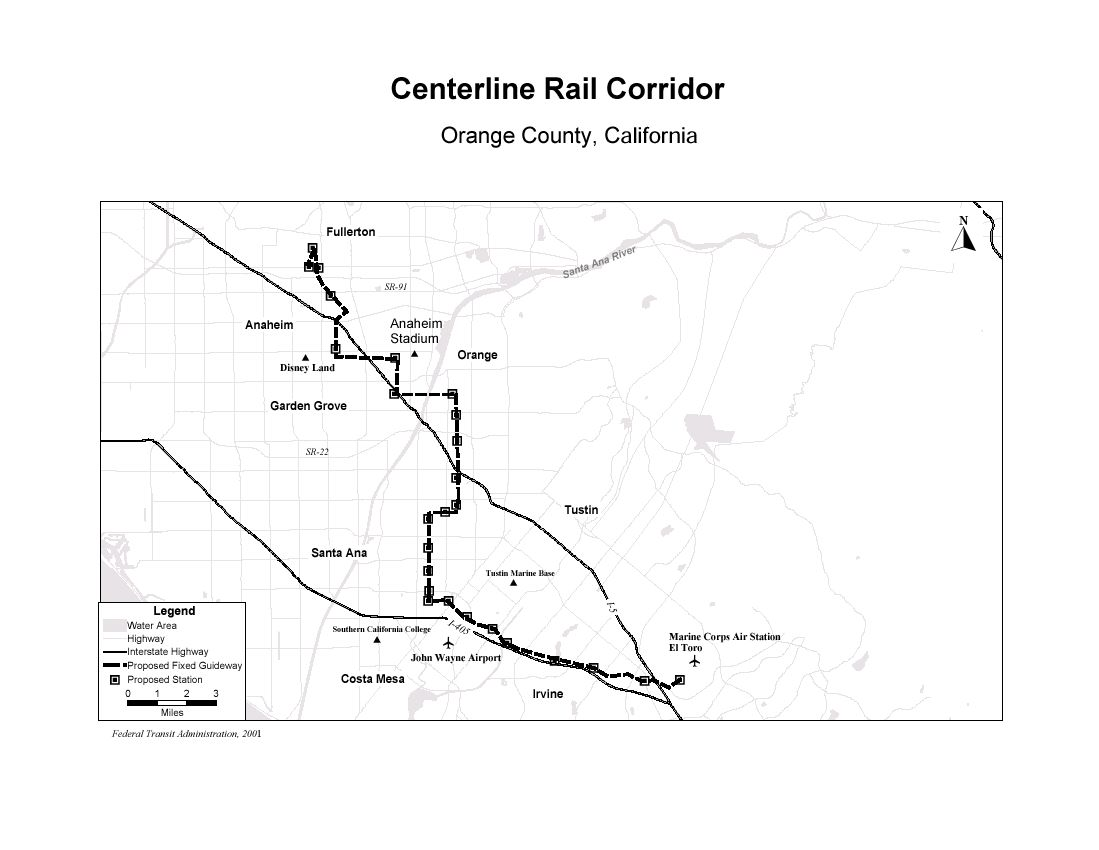
Original 1999 proposed route for CenterLine from Fullerton to Irvine. Later, a truncated "starter line" from Santa Ana to Irvine was proposed

The CenterLine was a proposed 9.3-mile (15 km) light rail system serving Irvine, Costa Mesa and Santa Ana. It was originally planned in the 1990s and was intended to open in 2009. Costing $1 billion, it was originally envisioned as a 30-mile (48 km) route that would run from Fullerton to Irvine, through Anaheim, Orange, Santa Ana and Costa Mesa. The route would have served destinations including John Wayne Airport, South Coast Metro, South Coast Plaza, Santa Ana College and downtown Santa Ana.

While OCTA secured funding through Measure M, lack of support from Orange County's congressional representatives resulted in no federal funds obtained for the proposed transit line. In February 2005, the CenterLine was suspended indefinitely, and in May 2005, the plan was officially scrapped in favor of expanding express bus service throughout Orange County and improving existing Metrolink commuter rail service.

== Highway and road operations ==
OCTA is responsible for the Countywide Master Highway Plan, which designates major arterial streets in the county, however, most road maintenance responsibilities fall with the city where the street operates in, or with the county, in the case of unincorporated areas. OCTA street funding is steered towards roadways on the Master Plan in recognition of their role in regional travel.

=== Recent projects ===
West County Connectors: In June 2010, OCTA broke ground on the West County Connectors project. The $328 million project is Orange County's largest stimulus project and one of the biggest construction jobs in nearly a decade. It added a 6-mile carpool lane and directly connected the carpool lanes on the San Diego Freeway (I-405) with the San Gabriel Freeway (I-605) and the Garden Grove Freeway (State Route 22). The project also modified and rebuilt three freeway overpasses at Valley View Street, Seal Beach Boulevard and the 7th Street Bridge into Long Beach.

Riverside Freeway (SR-91): This project added a new eastbound lane between the SR-241 in Orange County and the SR-71 in Riverside County, widening bridges and building new retaining and sound walls in an attempt to reduce traffic noise.

This was the first project in a series of capacity expansions planned for the SR-91. The second project added a new lane in each direction from the SR-55 to SR-241. The third project added a new westbound lane from SR-57 to Interstate 5. The project was completed in 2015.

Orange Freeway (SR-57): Work began in the summer of 2011 on the SR-57 to add a new northbound lane from Orangethorpe Avenue to Lambert. The project was completed in early 2014. Another project, which added a new northbound lane from Katella Avenue to Lincoln Avenue, got underway in early 2012 and was completed by late 2014.

I-5 Gateway Project: Construction began in spring 2006 on the I-5 Gateway project. The four-year project widened the remaining two miles of the I-5 in Orange County from the SR-91 to the Los Angeles County line. The I-5 Gateway project is the final link in the original Measure M's freeway expansion program. The project was completed in 2010.

In addition to freeway capacity expansions, OCTA is in the midst of the most comprehensive rail safety program in the nation that includes a public awareness program regarding safety near the tracks and implementing safety enhancements at more than 50 railroad crossings throughout the county.

The safety enhancements scheduled for completion in 2011 include:

- Upgrades to warning devices in place to advise drivers of train tracks ahead
- Additional gate arms to prevent drivers and pedestrians from crossing the tracks when the gates are lowered and a train is passing
- Extended and raised medians to deter drivers from passing around lowered gates
- Coordinated local traffic signals to prevent vehicles from stalling on the tracks

=== 91 and 405 Express Lanes ===
OCTA owns and operates the 91 Express Lanes and the 405 Express Lanes, two high-occupancy toll (HOT) lane facilities in the county.

OCTA purchased the 91 Express Lanes in 2003 from the California Private Transportation Corporation. Opening in 1995, the four-lane express lanes run in the median of the Riverside Freeway (SR-91) between the Interstate 15 and the Costa Mesa Freeway (SR-55). OCTA purchased the 91 Express Lanes without taxpayer money and removed a "non-compete" clause that prevented safety improvements and traffic capacity expansions along the stretch of tollway. In July 2003, OCTA adopted a toll policy for the 91 Express Lanes based on the concept of congestion management pricing, which is designed to optimize traffic flow at free-flow speeds. The policy calls for dropping and raising tolls based on traffic demand. Traffic volumes are monitored daily and adjusted quarterly.

The 405 Express Lanes between SR-73 and the I-605/SR-22 interchange near the Los Angeles County line opened in December 2023.

The other tollways in Orange County (SR-241, SR-261, and parts of SR-73 and SR-133) are governed by the Transportation Corridor Agencies.

== Governance ==
OCTA is a joint powers authority governed by a board of directors with 18 members, 17 of whom are voting members. The Board is composed of:

- Five Orange County Supervisors
- Five city council members or mayors, one from each supervisorial district, elected by the Orange County City Selection Committee, by district, on a population-weighted vote
- Five city council members or mayors, one from each supervisorial district, elected by the Orange County City Selection Committee, by district, on a one city/one vote basis
- Two public members appointed by majority vote of the other 15 voting members
- One non-voting member, the Caltrans District 12 Director

=== Board of Directors ===
The current members of the OCTA Board include:

==== Chair ====
- Jamey Federico, Dana Point city council member and appointee of Orange County City Selection Committee District 5 cities

==== Vice Chair ====
- Fred Jung, Fullerton council member district 1 and appointee of Orange County City Selection Committee District 4 cities

==== Board Members ====
- Valerie Amezcua, Santa Ana mayor member and appointee of Orange County City Selection Committee District 2 cities
- Doug Chaffee, Orange County Supervisor, District 4
- Katrina Foley, Orange County Supervisor, District 5
- William Go, Irvine city council member district 2 and appointee of Orange County City Selection Committee District 3 cities
- Patrick Harper, Fountain Valley city council member (at large) and appointee of Orange County City Selection Committee District 1 cities
- Michael Hennessey, Public Member
- Lauren Kleimen, Newport Beach mayor and appointee of Orange County City Selection Committee District 5 cities
- Stephanie Klopfenstein, Garden Grove mayor and appointee of Orange County City Selection Committee District 1 cities
- Carlos Leon, Anaheim council member district 2 and appointee of Orange County City Selection Committee District 4 cities
- Janet Nguyen, Orange County Supervisor, District 1
- Tam Nguyen, Public Member
- Vicente Sarmiento, Orange County Supervisor, District 2
- Kathy Tavoularis, Orange city council member and appointee of Orange County City Selection Committee District 2 cities
- Mark Tettemer, Lake Forest city council member and appointee of Orange County City Selection Committee District 3 cities
- Donald Wagner, Orange County Supervisor, District 3

==== Non-voting Board Members ====
- Lan Zhou, Caltrans District 12 Director

== Environmental mitigation ==
An 84-acre (34 ha) restoration project of the 300-acre (120 ha) Bee Flat Canyon site was done by Irvine Ranch Conservancy in partnership with OCTA as part of meeting the agency's mitigation requirements to offset the damage it does to the environment. The project was deemed a success in 2020 by the California Department of Fish and Wildlife and U.S. Fish and Wildlife Service.

== See also ==
- List of OCTA Routes

== See also ==
- OC Bus
- OC Streetcar
- Metrolink
