= Transportation Corridor Agencies =

State agencies in Orange County, California

Overview
- Chief executive: Valarie McFall
- Headquarters: Irvine, California
- Website: https://thetollroads.com/

Operation
- Began operation: 1986; 40 years ago

Transportation Corridor Agencies (TCA) are two joint powers authorities formed by the California State Legislature in 1986 to plan, finance, construct, and operate Orange County's toll roads. TCA consists of two local government agencies:

- The San Joaquin Hills Transportation Corridor Agency which oversees the San Joaquin Hills Toll Road (State Route 73).
- The Foothill/Eastern Transportation Corridor Agency which runs both the Foothill Toll Road (State Route 241) and the Eastern Toll Road (State Route 241 and State Route 261).

The toll roads maintained by TCA are financed with tax-exempt bonds on a stand-alone basis—taxpayers are not responsible for repaying any debt if toll revenues fall short.

Some California lawmakers and toll road advocates favor using similar local agencies to build and maintain tollways, especially after the controversy of authorizing a private company to initially run the 91 Express Lanes. Others oppose them, arguing that new toll roads will just facilitate and perpetuate sprawl.

The Transportation Corridor Agency funded studies which argued that the California gnatcatcher was not a distinct species, in order to argue for delisting of the species under the Endangered Species Act of 1973 and enable extension of the State Route 241.

FasTrak is the electronic toll collection system used by the TCA.

== History ==
The toll roads managed by Transportation Agencies were originally supposed to be free roads by 2033. However, TCA refinanced the debt in 2014, thus extending the agency's authority of the toll roads until 2053.

In 2018, Transportation Corridor Agencies signed a cooperative agreement with the San Bernardino County Transportation Authority to be the processing partner for the San Bernardino County high-occupancy toll lanes.

By 2020, Transportation Corridor Agencies had a budget of 400 million per year.

By March 2020, Transportation Corridor Agencies officially abandoned plans to extend State Route 241 through San Clemente.

In 2021, the city of San Clemente voted to leave the Transportation Corridor Agencies because the city lost faith that the agency would be able to pay off their debt in a timely manner.

A one-way interoperability agreement was reached between the Transportation Corridor Agencies and North Texas Tollway Authority (NTTA) in November 2024. This agreement, which took effect on June 1, 2025, allows FasTrak users that are registered under the TCA system to use their FasTrak toll tags on NTTA's and TEXpress Lanes tollways in the Dallas–Fort Worth metroplex, as well as North East Texas Regional Mobility Authority's (NETRMA) Loop 49 Toll Road in Tyler. Future interoperability agreements will later be reached with Texas Department of Transportation (TxDOT) operated toll roads in Austin, Brownsville and Houston, which will also include the Harris County Toll Road Authority (HCTRA) system for the latter.

== Roadways ==
Road name	Length (mi)	Length (km)	Southern terminus	Northern terminus	Formed	Removed	Notes
SR 73 Toll (San Joaquin Hills Toll Road)	11.0	17.7	I-5 in Laguna Niguel	Bison Avenue at Irvine/Newport Beach boundary	1996	current	The section of SR 73 from I-5 to Greenfield Road is not tolled. SR 73 continues north of Bison Avenue as the Corona Del Mar Freeway to I-405 in Costa Mesa
SR 133 Toll (Eastern Toll Road)	4.1	6.6	I-5 in Irvine	SR 241 in Irvine	1998	current	SR 133 continues south of I-5 as the Laguna Freeway to I-405 then as Laguna Canyon Road from I-405 to downtown Laguna Beach where it becomes Broadway to its terminus at SR 1 (Pacific Coast Highway).
SR 241 Toll (Foothill and Eastern Toll Roads)	24.5	39.4	Oso Parkway and Los Patrones Parkway near Las Flores	SR 91 in Anaheim	1993	current	Section of SR 241 north of SR 133 is part of the Eastern Transportation Corridor and south of SR 133 is the Foothill Transportation Corridor. Non-tolled continuation past the southern terminus of SR 241 to Cow Camp Road in Rancho Mission Viejo is Los Patrones Parkway.
SR 261 Toll (Eastern Toll Road)	6.2	10.0	Walnut Avenue and Jamboree Road in Irvine	SR 241 in Orange	1999	current	Non-tolled continuation past the southern terminus of SR 261 to Bayside Drive in Newport Beach is Jamboree Road.
I-10 Express Lanes (San Bernardino County)	11.13	17.91	Los Angeles–San Bernardino county line	Etiwanda Avenue in Ontario	2024	current	TCA serves as the processing partner of the San Bernardino County Express Lanes under a cooperative agreement with the San Bernardino County Transportation Authority.

Toll facilities owned and operated by the Orange County Transportation Authority (OCTA) fall outside TCA's jurisdiction, including the 91 Express Lanes between SR 55 in Anaheim to the Riverside County line, and the 405 Express Lanes between SR 73 in Costa Mesa and the I-605/SR 22 interchange in Seal Beach.

== Criticism ==
In 2020, Transportation Corridor Agencies were criticized for trying to convert a non-tolled road into a toll road. Transportation Corridor Agencies also objected to state legislation that forbid them from expanding the toll system in Orange County after TCA was caught using toll money to pay lobbyists.

In 2020, the Orange County Grand Jury released a report that stated that the Transportation Corridor Agencies has completely fulfilled its original mandate, while criticizing them for trying to involve itself in future toll planning by claiming that, "much of the planning is being performed by consultants and TCA staff, who have a financial interest in seeing the TCA continue beyond its original mandate, and out of view of many of the TCA board members and the public thus creating a conflict of interest issue”.

In 2021, the Transportation Corridor Agencies were criticized by the Orange County Grand Jury for collecting over $28 billion on a highway system that cost $2.8 billion to build. The Grand Jury's main argument is that TCA has no excuse to wait to pay off the debt in 2053.

In 2022, the TCA CEO resigned due to a misconduct investigation.
