= FasTrak =

Electronic toll collection system in California

- Industry: Electronic toll collection
- Founded: 1993
- Area served: California

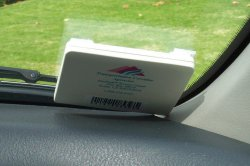
Mounted FasTrak transponder

FasTrak is the electronic toll collection (ETC) system used in the state of California in the United States. It operates statewide on all toll roads, toll bridges, and high-occupancy toll lanes that are part of the California Freeway and Expressway System.

Like other ETC systems, FasTrak is designed to eliminate the need for vehicles to stop at toll booths, thereby reducing traffic congestion commonly associated with toll collection. Its implementation aligns with the U.S. Department of Transportation's Intelligent Transportation Systems initiative.

California's toll facilities are decentralized and managed by various local public agencies and special-purpose districts, rather than being operated directly by the California Department of Transportation (Caltrans) or another centralized state agency. Concerned about the potential development of incompatible ETC systems, the California State Legislature passed Senate Bill 1523 in 1990. This legislation required Caltrans to develop a statewide ETC specification that all toll agencies were mandated to follow.

In 1993, the Transportation Corridor Agencies opened the Foothill Toll Road in Orange County, marking the first implementation of the standardized ETC system, which it branded as FasTrak. The state continues to delegate the responsibility for issuing and managing FasTrak accounts to individual toll agencies.

== Operations and functionality ==
=== Technology ===
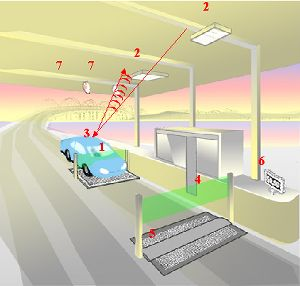
Diagram of the FasTrak toll collection system: As a vehicle enters the toll point, sensors (1) detect it and antennas (2) read the FasTrak transponder (3) on the vehicle. As the vehicle passes through the exit light curtain (4), a treadle (5) determines its axle count to calculate the correct toll, and the account is charged. A display (6) gives feedback to the driver. If no transponder is detected, cameras (7) photograph the license plate.

FasTrak uses radio-frequency identification (RFID) technology operating at 915 MHz to identify vehicles via a transponder mounted on the vehicle (typically to the windshield). As a vehicle passes through a toll point, antennas detect and read the transponder, and the system automatically deducts the toll from a prepaid account.

Caltrans was given the mandate to develop and maintain an open, statewide ETC specification known as "Title 21" after it was added to Title 21 of the California Code of Regulations. FasTrak transponders are compatible across California toll roads but not with out-of-state systems like E-ZPass. In 2018, the state began a transition to the national ISO/IEC 18000-63 (6C) standard to support future nationwide interoperability.

If a transponder is not detected, cameras photograph the vehicle’s license plate and attempt to match it to a FasTrak account. If no account is found, either an invoice with no penalty (in locations supporting "pay by plate") or a violation notice is issued and mailed to the registered owner of the vehicle.

=== Tag types ===
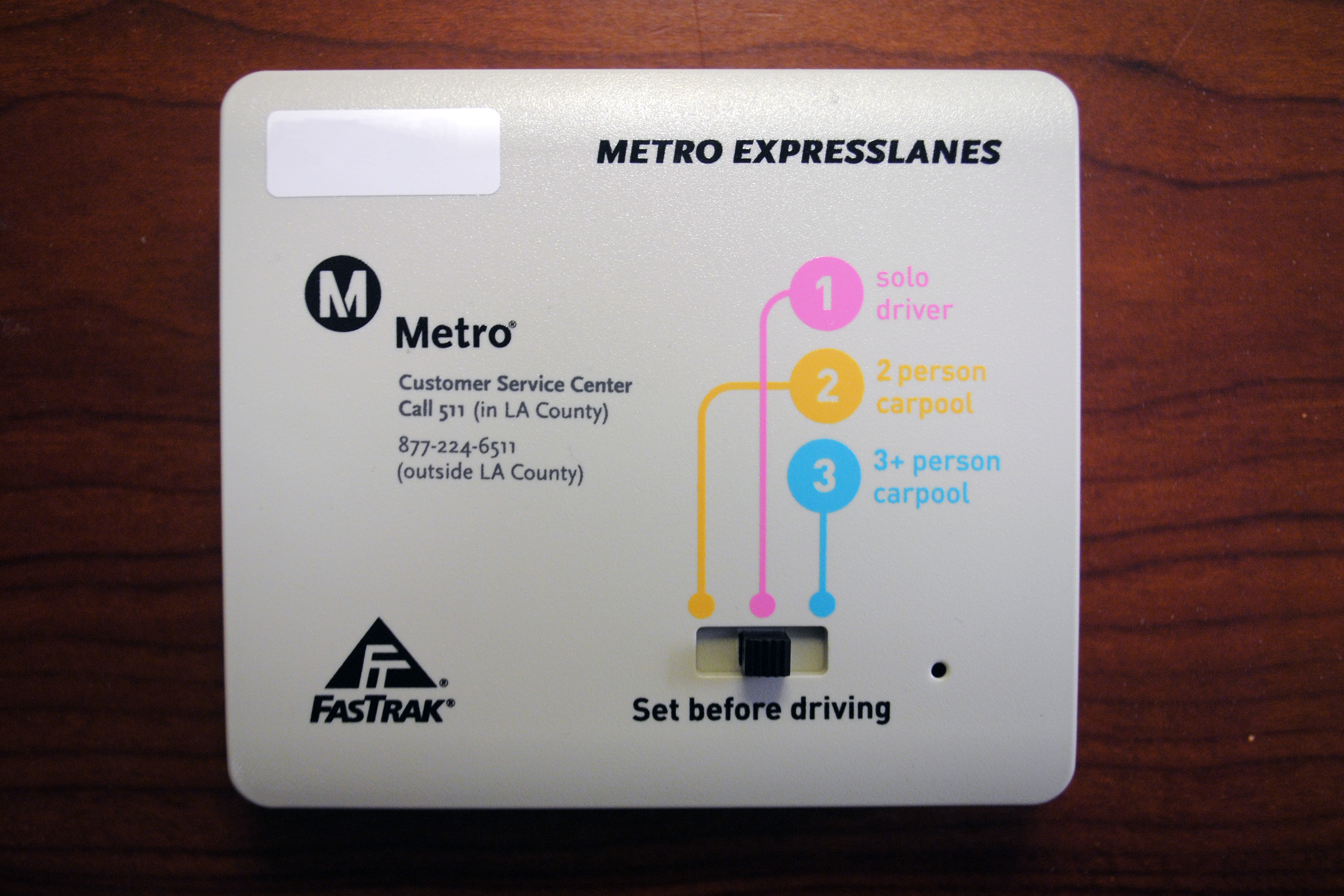
A switchable FasTrak device used by the Metro ExpressLanes in Los Angeles County

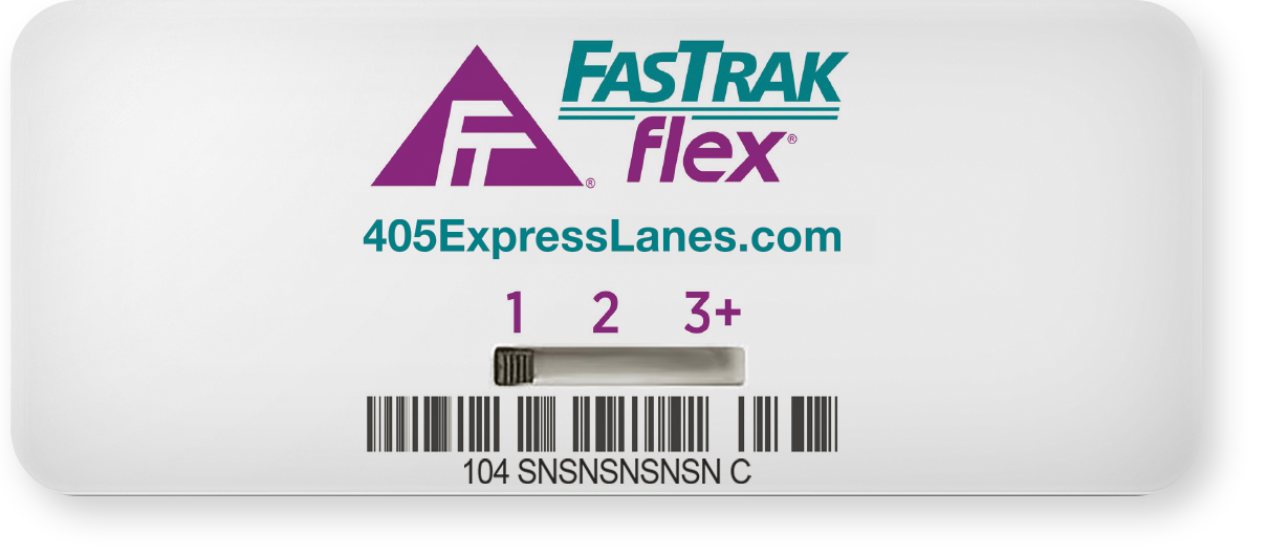
Picture of OCTA Fastrak Flex transponder compliant with 6C standard.

FasTrak supports multiple transponder types:

- Standard tag – A hard-case transponder used on all FasTrak toll roads.
- Sticker tag – A low-cost adhesive tag issued by some agencies.
- FasTrak Flex – A switchable tag (settings for 1, 2, or 3+ occupants) required for HOV toll discounts.

A FasTrak CAV tag was also made available to those with a Clean Air Vehicle (CAV) decal for applicable toll discounts. When the federal law authorizing the decal program expired on September 30, 2025, existing CAV tags automatically converted to function like Flex tags.

Some toll roads allow carpoolers to avoid tolls by placing their standard tag in a mylar bag to block the radio signals, others require a FasTrak Flex transponder.

=== Service center operations ===
All Bay Area toll facilities use a centralized billing and customer service system operated by the Bay Area Toll Authority (BATA).

Transportation Corridor Agencies, operator of the Orange County toll roads, also operates the billing and customer service system for the San Bernardino County high-occupancy toll lanes.

Although the 91 Express Lanes is operated by both the Orange County Transportation Authority and the Riverside County Transportation Commission, that facility uses a centralized billing and customer service system operated by the former.

All other Southern California agencies maintain separate billing and customer service systems.

Some agencies "sell" (charge the initial prepaid toll deposit) transponders in a retail setting, such as Costco stores. Customers must still register their transponders with the issuing agency.

=== Fees ===
FasTrak account fees and requirements vary by issuing agency:

Agency	Area	Monthly fee	Initial prepaid toll deposit	Notes
BATA	San Francisco Bay Area	None	$25	
TCA	Orange County and San Bernardino County	None	None	
SANDAG	San Diego County	$1	$50	$3.50 minimum monthly toll
LA Metro	Los Angeles County	$1	$40 (automatic replenishment) $75 (manual replenishment)	
OCTA	Orange County	None	$40 (automatic replenishment) $50 (manual replenishment)	$100 setup fee
OCTA	Orange County	$2	$40 (automatic replenishment) $50 (manual replenishment)	
RCTC	Riverside County	$2	$40	

=== Security ===
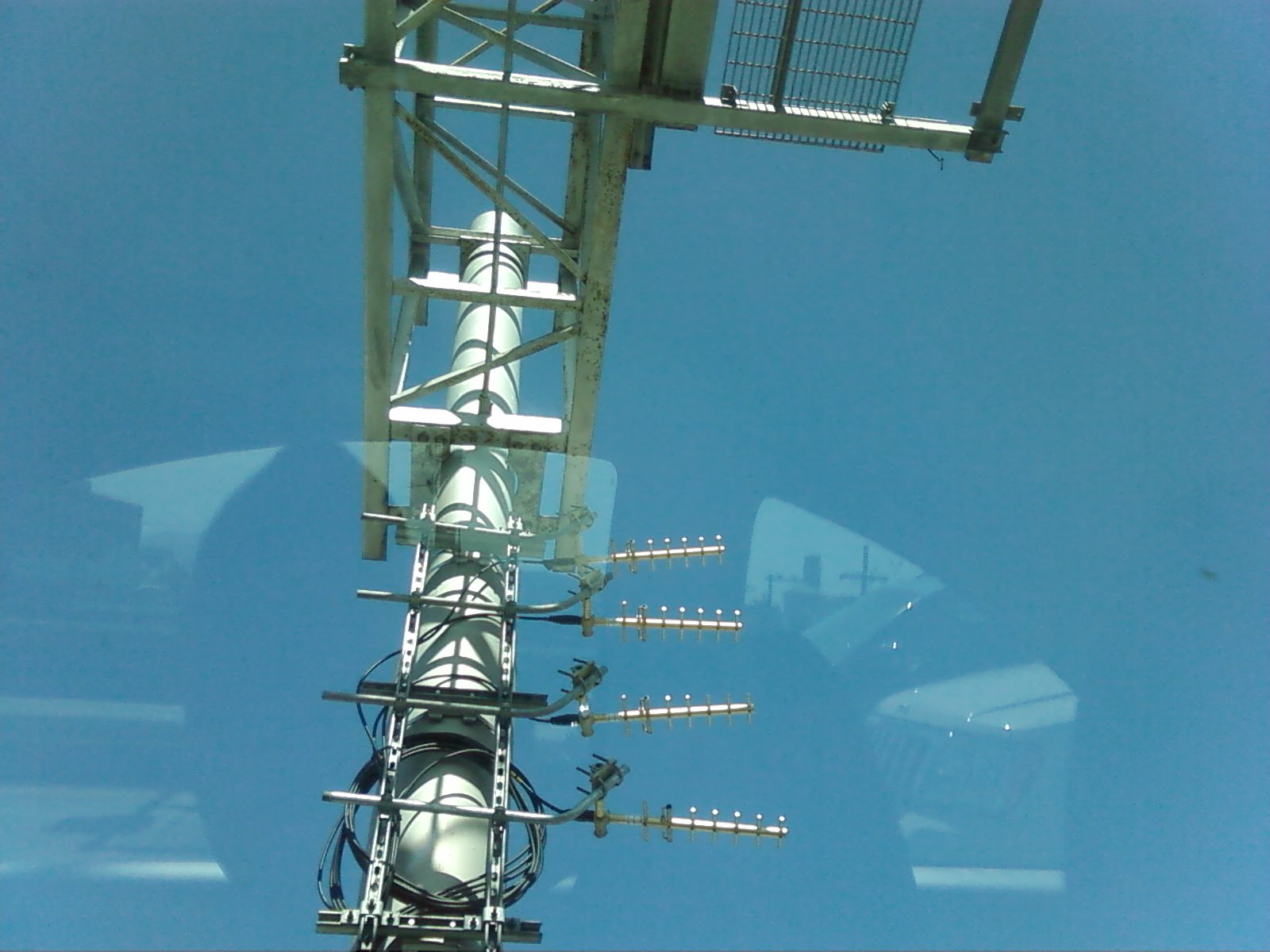
FasTrak antennae that pull data used to generate 5-1-1 traffic information

In 2008, researchers found that FasTrak transponders lacked encryption and could be queried or updated remotely. As the Title 21 specification is publicly available, this raised concerns about potential misuse. Transponders are also used to generate 5-1-1 traffic data, using sensors and antennae placed across various freeways. The Metropolitan Transportation Commission responded by reviewing the system’s security and exploring possible improvements with vendors.

== History ==
After the first electronic toll collection (ETC) system in North America was implemented on the Dallas North Tollway in 1989, various toll agencies in California began expressing interest in similar systems. Given that toll roads and bridges in the state are managed by different government entities, there was concern about the potential emergence of multiple, incompatible ETC systems. To address this, the California State Legislature passed Senate Bill 1523 in 1990, directing the California Department of Transportation (Caltrans) to create a standardized statewide technical specification for ETC systems. California subsequently became the first U.S. state to require all toll facilities to use a uniform ETC system. This specification was later codified in Title 21, Division 2, Chapter 16 of the California Code of Regulations.

The Foothill Toll Road in Orange County, California became the first toll facility in California to implement ETC when it opened in 1993. The Transportation Corridor Agencies (TCA), which manages the toll road, branded the system as "FasTrak". TCA still holds the trademark for the "FasTrak" name and logo.

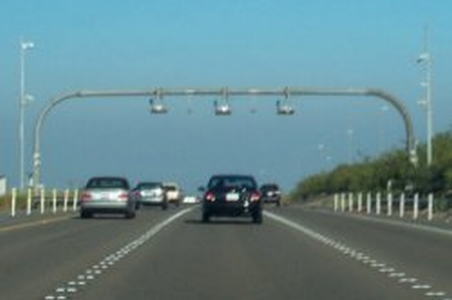
Three-lane FasTrak site in Orange County

The original FasTrak transponder was a device about the size of a Walkman, into which a smart card was inserted. However, the device was costly to produce and the smart card offered little advantage to customers. By 1995, when the 91 Express Lanes opened, the transponders had been redesigned to be coaster-sized.

FasTrak was subsequently deployed on the San Joaquin Hills Toll Road (1996), the Eastern Toll Road (1998), and the high-occupancy toll (HOT) lanes on Interstate 15 in San Diego, California (1998).

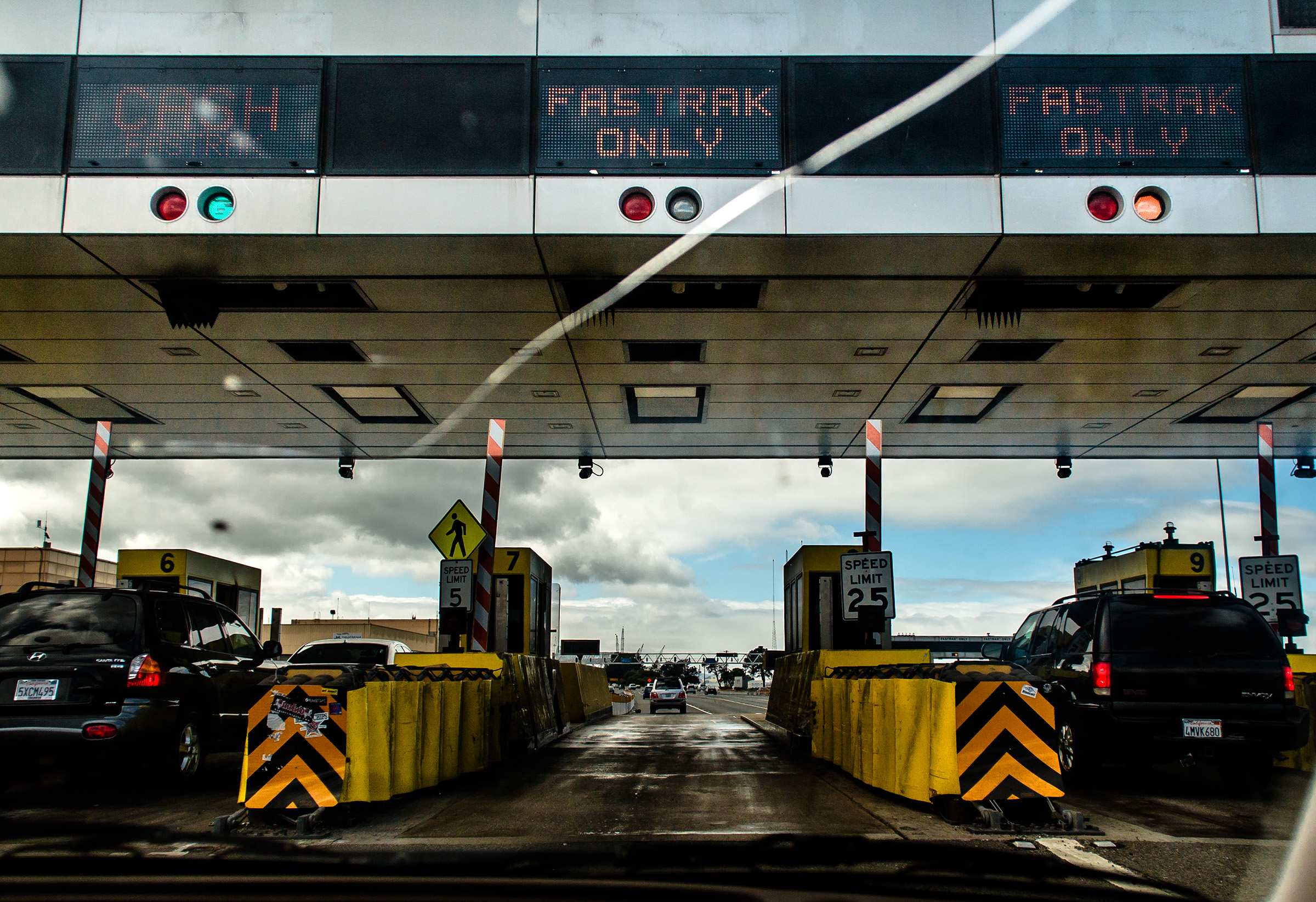
San Francisco–Oakland Bay Bridge toll plaza in 2008. Booths now display "FasTrak or Invoice" following the phaseout of cash payments.

Adapting FasTrak for California’s toll bridges required additional modifications, especially to handle 18 different toll classifications for trucks. After a trial at the Carquinez Bridge in 1996 revealed accuracy issues, improvements were made, before the bridge adopted FasTrak in 1997. Despite these developments, other state-run Bay Area toll bridges did not adopt the system until October 2000, due to bureaucratic and technical delays. The independently managed Golden Gate Bridge introduced FasTrak a few months earlier in July 2000.

The San Diego-Coronado Bridge briefly used FasTrak before tolls were eliminated in 2002. In 2005, the Bay Area FasTrak Customer Center opened, consolidating services for regional bridges and the Golden Gate Bridge.

FasTrak has since expanded to cover all new toll facilities in California, which are required by law to adopt the system. In 2009, San Francisco International Airport began accepting FasTrak in its parking garages.

The introduction of the Metro ExpressLanes in Los Angeles in 2012 led to the introduction of FasTrak Flex transponders with occupancy switches (1, 2, or 3+ riders), allowing automated toll calculations for carpools and solo drivers. TCA began issuing switchable transponders in 2013, followed by the 91 Express Lanes and the Bay Area in 2015.

The TCA introduced a sticker transponder in 2019 to replace the earlier plastic model. The new sticker transponders cost the agency less than $1 each, compared to approximately $20 for the plastic version. The lower cost enabled TCA to eliminate monthly account maintenance fees and the requirement for a prepaid deposit.

California continues moving toward open road tolling, eliminating cash transactions in favor of transponders, license plate tolling, and online or phone payments. The Golden Gate Bridge became fully cashless in March 2013, followed by TCA-operated toll roads in May 2014. In 2019, California approved the phaseout of toll takers on all state-owned bridges. Due to the COVID-19 pandemic, electronic-only tolling was implemented in March 2020 and became permanent by 2021. The only remaining cash-accepting toll road is the South Bay Expressway, which has unstaffed cash machines.

In line with MAP-21 all ETC systems nationwide were required to achieve interoperability by October 1, 2016. In response, California passed Assembly Bill 493 in 2013, enabling collaboration between Caltrans and toll agencies to comply with the mandate. California regulators later approved a phase-in of transponder technology using the ISO/IEC 18000-63 (6C) standard. Rollout began in 2018 and was expected to be complete by 2024.

California state law prohibits tolling agencies from sharing information regarding tolls collected to other states. However in the interim, FasTrak member agencies may pursue one-way interoperability with their account holders. In June 2025, FasTrak users under the TCA system were permitted to use their FasTrak toll tags on toll roads and managed lanes operated by the North Texas Tollway Authority (NTTA) and North East Texas Regional Mobility Authority (NETRMA). TCA will later permit their users to use FasTrak on toll roads operated by Texas Department of Transportation (TxDOT) and the Harris County Toll Road Authority (HCTRA).

== Toll facilities using FasTrak ==
=== Current ===
All eight toll bridges only collect tolls in one direction. All other toll facilities collect tolls in either direction, though some high-occupancy toll lane toll lanes exist in only one direction of their freeway in parts or the whole of their length.

^ indicates that carpools require the switchable "FasTrak Flex" transponder.
HOV 2+ indicates that carpools require two or more persons.
HOV 3+ indicates that carpools require three or more persons.
† indicates that two-person carpools are tolled differently than solo drivers or carpools with three or more, typically at a rate intermediate between the solo and 3+ rates

==== Toll bridges ====
Name	Highway(s)	Location	South or west terminus	North or east terminus	Direction tolled	HOV	Account agency	Ref.
Antioch Bridge	SR 160 north	San Joaquin River	Antioch	Sacramento County	Northbound	3+	BATA	
Benicia–Martinez Bridge	I-680 north	Carquinez Strait	Martinez	Benicia	Northbound	3+	BATA	
Carquinez Bridge	I-80 east	Carquinez Strait	Crockett	Vallejo	Eastbound	3+	BATA	
Dumbarton Bridge	SR 84 west	San Francisco Bay	Menlo Park	Fremont	Westbound	3+	BATA	
Golden Gate Bridge	US 101 south / SR 1 south	Golden Gate	San Francisco	Marin County	Southbound	3+	BATA	
Richmond–San Rafael Bridge	I-580 west	San Francisco Bay	San Rafael	Richmond	Westbound	3+	BATA	
San Francisco–Oakland Bay Bridge	I-80 west	San Francisco Bay	San Francisco	Oakland	Westbound	3+	BATA	
San Mateo–Hayward Bridge	SR 92 west	San Francisco Bay	Foster City	Hayward	Westbound	3+	BATA	

==== Toll roads ====
Name	Highway	Location	South or west terminus	North or east terminus	HOV	Account agency	Ref.
Eastern Toll Road	SR 241 / SR 261 / SR 133	Orange County	Irvine	SR 91 in Anaheim–Yorba Linda	None	TCA	
Foothill Toll Road	SR 241	Orange County	Oso Parkway near Rancho Santa Margarita	SR 133 near Irvine	None	TCA	
San Joaquin Hills Toll Road	SR 73	Orange County	I-5 in Mission Viejo	Bison Ave in Irvine	None	TCA	
South Bay Expressway	SR 125	San Diego County	SR 11 / SR 905 in Otay Mesa	SR 54 near Chula Vista	None	SANDAG	

==== High-occupancy toll lanes ====
Name	Highway	Location	South or west terminus	North or east terminus	HOV	Account agency	Ref.
I-10 Metro ExpressLanes (El Monte Busway)	I-10	Los Angeles County	Alameda Street in Los Angeles	I-605 in Baldwin Park	^†	LA Metro	
I-10 San Bernardino Express Lanes	I-10	San Bernardino County	I-10 at the Los Angeles County line	Etiwanda Avenue in Ontario	^3+	TCA	
I-15 Express Lanes (San Diego County)	I-15	San Diego County	SR 163 in San Diego	SR 78 in Escondido	2+	SANDAG	
I-15 Riverside Express Lanes	I-15	Riverside County	Cajalco Road in Corona	SR 60 in Jurupa Valley	^3+	RCTC	
SR 85 Express Lanes	SR 85	Santa Clara County	Central Expressway in Mountain View	US 101 in Mountain View	^†	BATA	
91 Express Lanes	SR 91	Orange and Riverside Counties	SR 55 in Anaheim	I-15 in Corona	3+	OCTA	
I-80 Express Lanes	I-80	Solano County	Red Top Road in Fairfield	Leisure Town Road in Vacaville	^†	BATA	
US 101 Express Lanes	US 101	Santa Clara and San Mateo Counties	SR 237 near Mountain View	I-380 in San Bruno	^†	BATA	
I-110 Metro ExpressLanes (Harbor Transitway)	I-110	Los Angeles	Harbor Gateway Transit Center	Adams Boulevard	^2+	LA Metro	
SR 237 Express Lanes	SR 237	Santa Clara County	Mathilda Avenue in Sunnyvale	I-880 in Milpitas	^†	BATA	
405 Express Lanes	I-405	Orange County	SR 73 in Costa Mesa	I-605 in Seal Beach	^†	OCTA	
I-580 Express Lanes	I-580	Alameda County	Hacienda Drive in Dublin/Pleasanton (Note: The westbound I-580 Express Lanes extend further west to San Ramon Road/Foothill Road in Dublin/Pleasanton)	North Greenville Road in Livermore	^2+	BATA	
I-680 Sunol Express Lanes	I-680	Alameda and Santa Clara Counties	Auto Mall Parkway in Fremont (Note: The southbound I-680 Sunol Express Lanes extend further north to Alcosta Blvd in San Ramon and further south to SR 237 in Milpitas, though only the latter is tolled)	SR 84 near Sunol	^2+	BATA	
I-680 Contra Costa Express Lanes	I-680	Contra Costa County	Livorna Road in Alamo (Note: The southbound I-680 Contra Costa County Express Lanes extend further north to Marina Vista Avenue in Martinez)	Alcosta Boulevard in San Ramon	^2+	BATA	
I-880 Express Lanes	I-880	Alameda and Santa Clara Counties	Dixon Landing Road in Milpitas/Fremont line (Note: The southbound I-880 Express Lanes extend further north to Hegenberger Road in Oakland and further south to SR 237 in Milpitas)	Lewelling Boulevard in San Lorenzo	^†	BATA	

=== Planned or proposed facilities ===
The following is a partial list of toll facilities that are either in the planning or proposal stages (sorted by highway number):

Name	Highway	Location	South or west terminus	North or east terminus	Scheduled to open
I-5 Express Lanes	I-5	San Diego County	La Jolla Village Drive in San Diego	Harbor Drive in Oceanside	By 2035
I-10 Metro ExpressLanes Extension	I-10	Los Angeles County	I-605 in Baldwin Park	San Bernardino County line	TBD
I-10 San Bernardino Express Lanes Phase 2	I-10	San Bernardino County	Etiwanda Avenue in Ontario	Pepper Avenue in Colton	TBD
I-10 San Bernardino Express Lanes Phase 3	I-10	San Bernardino County	Pepper Avenue in Colton	Ford Street in Redlands	TBD
SR 11 Toll Road	SR 11	San Diego County	SR 125 / SR 905	Otay Mesa East Port of Entry	TBD
I-15 Express Lanes Southern Extension	I-15	Riverside County	SR 74 in Lake Elsinore	Cajalco Road in Corona	By 2030
SR 37 Sears Point Toll Road	SR 37	Sonoma and Solano Counties	SR 121 at Sears Point	Mare Island in Vallejo	TBD
Yolo US 50 Express Lanes	US 50	Yolo County	I-80 in West Sacramento	I-5 in Sacramento	TBD (Note: Included as part of the Yolo I-80 Express Lanes Project)
Yolo I-80 Express Lanes	I-80	Yolo County	Solano County line	West El Camino Avenue near the Sacramento County line	TBD
Silicon Valley Express Lanes Phase 4	SR 85	Santa Clara County	US 101 in Southern San Jose	SR 87 in San Jose	Winter 2028
Silicon Valley Express Lanes future extension	SR 85	Santa Clara County	SR 87 in San Jose	Central Expressway (Note: Not including the already completed portion of the Express Lanes from Central Expressway to US 101 north) in Mountain View	TBD
Silicon Valley Express Lanes Phase 5	US 101	Santa Clara County	I-880 in San Jose	SR 237 near Mountain View	Spring 2029
Silicon Valley Express Lanes Phase 6	US 101	Santa Clara County	SR 85 in southern San Jose	I-880 in San Jose	TBD
Silicon Valley Express Lanes future southern extension	US 101	Santa Clara County	Dunne Avenue in Morgan Hill	SR 85 in southern San Jose	TBD
I-105 Express Lanes	I-105	Los Angeles County	SR 1 in Los Angeles	Studebaker Road in Norwalk	By 2029
I-405 Sepulveda Pass Express Lanes	I-405	Los Angeles County	I-10 in Los Angeles	US 101 in Los Angeles	Late 2028
I-680 Sunol Northbound Express Lane Southern Extension	I-680	Alameda and Santa Clara Counties.	SR 237 in Milpitas	Auto Mall Parkway in Fremont	TBD
I-680 Sunol Express Lanes Northern Extension	I-680	Alameda County	SR 84 in Sunol	Alcosta Boulevard in San Ramon	Fall 2025 (Southbound); TBD (Northbound)
I-880 Express Lanes Southern Extension	I-880	Santa Clara County Counties.	US 101 in San Jose	SR 237 in Milpitas	TBD

== Facilities not under FasTrak ==
While the California state highway system officially treats the following routes as discontinuous through the following national parks, respectively, signs within these parks and some commercially produced maps may show these highways as continuous. The park entrance fees are handled by the National Park Service, not FasTrak or Caltrans.

- SR 41 / SR 120 / SR 140 in Yosemite National Park.
- SR 89 in Lassen Volcanic National Park.
- SR 146 in Pinnacles National Park.
- SR 180 / SR 198 in Kings Canyon and Sequoia National Parks

The 17-Mile Drive, a scenic toll road in Pebble Beach is owned and operated by the Pebble Beach Company and does not utilize FasTrak for toll collection.
