= CA-133 =

CA-133 may refer to:

- California State Route 133, a highway in the US state of California
- Caproni Ca.133, an experimental aircraft
