= California State Route 73 =

Highway and toll road in Orange County, California

State Route 73
- SR 73 highlighted in red

Route information
- Maintained by Caltrans and TCA
- Length: 17.764 mi (28.588 km)
- Existed: 1978 (1996 in current form)–present

Major junctions
- South end: I-5 at the San Juan Capistrano–Mission Viejo–Laguna Niguel tripoint
- SR 133 in Laguna Beach; SR 55 in Costa Mesa
- North end: I-405 in Costa Mesa

Location
- Country: United States
- State: California
- Counties: Orange

Highway system
- State highways in California; Interstate; US; State; Scenic; History; Pre‑1964; Unconstructed; Deleted; Freeways
← SR 72	→ SR 74

State Route 73 (SR 73) is an approximately 17.76-mile (28.58 km) state highway in Orange County, California. The southernmost 12 miles (19.31 km) of the highway is a toll road operated by the San Joaquin Hills Transportation Corridor Agency named the San Joaquin Hills Transportation Corridor, which opened in November 1996. The northernmost 5.76 miles (9.27 km) of the highway, which opened in 1978, is part of the Corona del Mar Freeway. SR 73's southern terminus is at Interstate 5 (I-5) near the San Juan Capistrano–Mission Viejo–Laguna Niguel tripoint. Its northern terminus is at Interstate 405 (I-405) in Costa Mesa. The highway's alignment through the San Joaquin Hills follows an approximately parallel path between the Pacific Coast Highway and I-405. Currently, there are no HOV lanes for the three-mile freeway segment, but the medians have been designed with sufficient clearance for their construction should the need arise in the future.

== Route description ==
Route 73 is defined in section 373 of the California Streets and Highways Code, and that the highway is "from Route 5 near San Juan Capistrano to Route 405 via the San Joaquin Hills".

SR 73 begins at an interchange with I-5 near the San Juan Capistrano–Mission Viejo–Laguna Niguel tripoint. The freeway heads northwest into Laguna Niguel before the tolled portion begins at the Greenfield Drive exit. After passing Greenfield Drive, SR 73 enters Aliso Viejo before entering Laguna Beach, where SR 73 has an interchange with SR 133. Following this, the road passes through Crystal Cove State Park, where the main toll plazas are located. After leaving the state park, SR 73 straddles the border between Irvine and Newport Beach and provides easy access to University of California, Irvine through the Bison Avenue exit. Following the MacArthur Boulevard exit, the tolled part of the road ends and becomes a freeway. SR 73 continues into Newport Beach, running along the southern boundary of Orange County John Wayne Airport (IATA Airport Code SNA). Entering Costa Mesa, SR 73 interchanges with SR 55 before ending at I-405.

SR 73 is part of the California Freeway and Expressway System, and is part of the National Highway System, a network of highways that are considered essential to the country's economy, defense, and mobility by the Federal Highway Administration.

== History ==
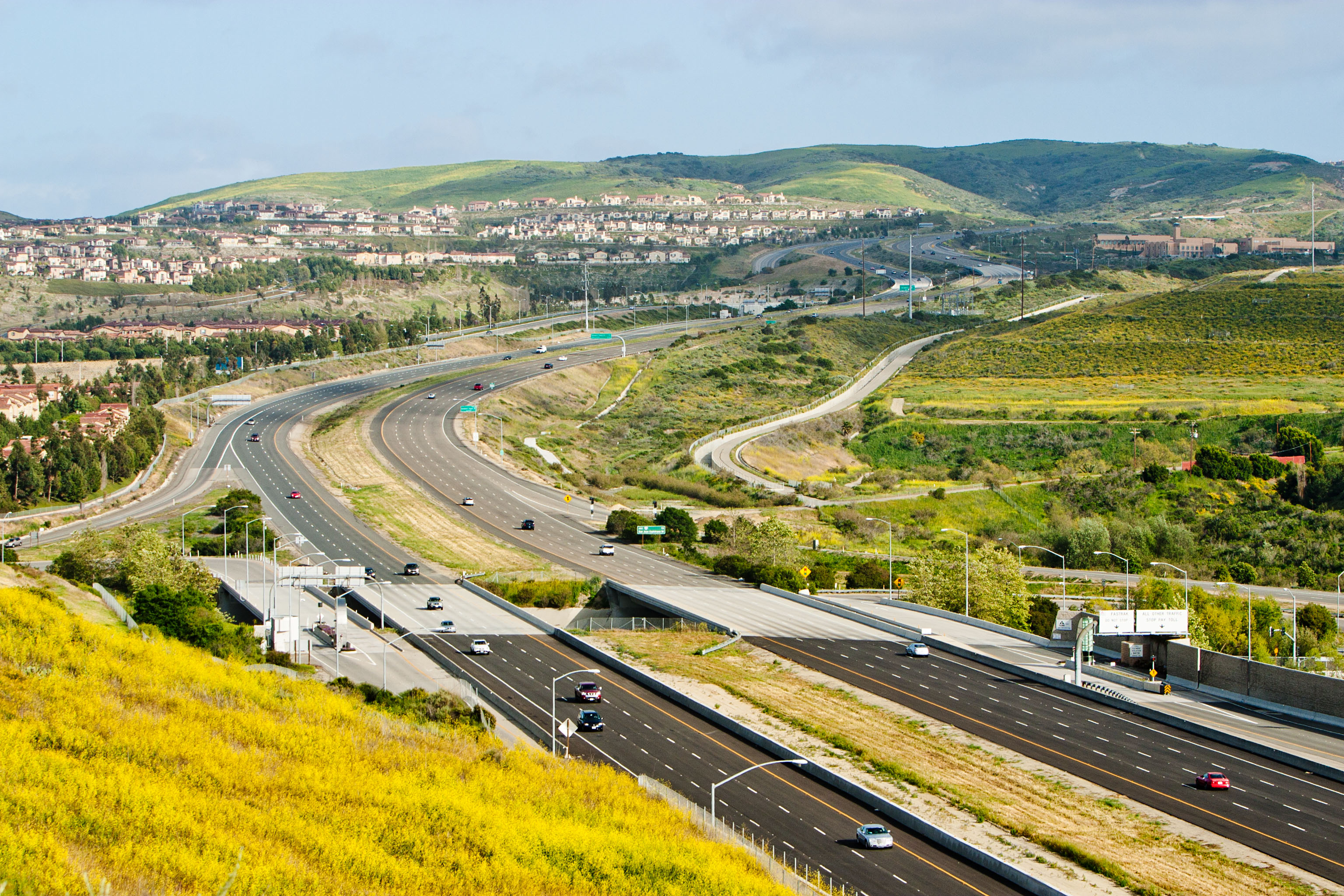
SR 73 climbs into the San Joaquin Hills, as seen looking southward from University Hills in Irvine. In the foreground is the Bonita Canyon Drive exit.

Originally, SR 73's southern terminus was SR 1 (Pacific Coast Highway) in Corona del Mar. Specifically, SR 73's Corona del Mar Freeway's southern terminus was at MacArthur Boulevard, and the SR 73 designation ran along MacArthur south to SR 1.

The design and construction of the tollway portion of SR 73 was overseen by the San Joaquin Hills Transportation Corridor Agencies, or SJHTCA, an agency formed in 1988 for purpose of providing a direct route between I-5 and I-405 through the San Joaquin Hills. Under this realignment, heading southbound, SR 73 becomes a designated toll road immediately after the Jamboree/MacArthur ramp and remains so until its southern terminus at I-5. Though the next exit heading southbound, Bison Avenue, is part of the toll road, it is toll-free, as is the first exit, Greenfield Drive, heading northbound from I-5.

The total cost of the tollway project was $800 million. It included 10 interchanges, 68 bridges, 725,000 square feet (67,400 m^{2}) of retaining walls, and 32 million cubic yards (24,000,000 m^{3}) of excavation at completion. Construction was divided into four sections, each with an individual management system and quality control. A joint venture led by Kiewit Pacific Co., a subsidiary of Kiewit Corporation, completed this project in 1996.

SR 73's toll road was the first to be financed with tax-exempt bonds on a stand-alone basis, including construction and environmental risk. In 2011, $2.1 billion in debt for the San Joaquin Hills toll roads was restructured, which pushed back the time until the bonds are paid off and the route becomes a freeway to 2042. In 2014, the debt was again restructured in an attempt to get improved interest rates, improved debt ratings, and in the process save $44 million in debt repayment. This resulted in another eight years of payments, delaying the pay-off date to 2050. Under this new plan the debt can be paid off earlier than 2050 if ridership and revenue improve.

== Tolls ==
The tolled portion of SR 73 (beginning after Greenfield Drive in the northbound direction, and starting after the Bison Avenue exit in the southbound direction) employs a barrier toll system, where drivers are charged flat-rate tolls based on what particular toll booths they pass through. Since May 13, 2014, the road has been using an all-electronic, open road tolling system, and on October 2, 2019, the license plate tolling program, under the brand name "ExpressAccount", was discontinued. Drivers may still pay using the FasTrak electronic toll collection device, or via a one time payment online 5 days before or after their trip on the toll road. Drivers who do not pay after 5 days will be assessed an additional toll violation penalty.

Drivers who drive the entire tolled segment of SR 73 will only encounter the Catalina View toll gantry. As of July 2026, the gantry uses a variable pricing scheme based on the time of day for FasTrak users (it is not truly congestion priced because toll rates come from a preset schedule and are not based on actual congestion); non-FasTrak drivers must pay the $9.74 maximum toll regardless of the day and time. Tolls are also collected at a flat rate for all drivers at the northbound exits and southbound entrances of La Paz Road ($2.81), Aliso Creek Road ($3.50), and SR 133 ($4.24); and at the southbound exits and northbound entrances of Newport Coast Drive ($3.94) and Bonita Canyon Drive ($2.38).

== Exit list ==
The entire route is in Orange County.

Location	mi	km	Exit	Destinations	Notes
San Juan Capistrano–Mission Viejo– Laguna Niguel tripoint	0.00	0.00	—	I-5 south (San Diego Freeway) – San Diego	No access to I-5 north; southern terminus of SR 73; I-5 north exit 85A
Laguna Niguel–Laguna Hills line	1.79	2.88	2	Greenfield Drive	Southern end of toll road; only free exit for northbound traffic
Aliso Viejo	2.91	4.68	3	Moulton Parkway	Southbound exit and northbound entrance
Aliso Viejo	3.40	5.47	3	La Paz Road	Tolled northbound exit and southbound entrance
Aliso Viejo	4.72	7.60	4	Aliso Creek Road	Tolled northbound exit and southbound entrance
Aliso Viejo	5.25	8.45	5	Pacific Park Drive / Glenwood Drive	Southbound exit and northbound entrance
Aliso Viejo–Laguna Beach line	6.35– 6.82	10.22– 10.98	6	SR 133 (Laguna Canyon Road) / El Toro Road (CR S18)	Tolled northbound exit and southbound entrance; signed as exit 7 southbound
San Joaquin Hills	8.70	14.00	Catalina View toll gantry		
Irvine–Newport Beach line	11.46	18.44	11	Newport Coast Drive	Tolled southbound exit and northbound entrance
Irvine–Newport Beach line	12.00	19.31	12	Bonita Canyon Drive	Tolled southbound exit and northbound entrance
Irvine–Newport Beach line	12.74	20.50	13	Bison Avenue	Last free exit for southbound traffic
Irvine–Newport Beach line	14.00	22.53	14	MacArthur Boulevard north – John Wayne Airport	Northbound exit and southbound entrance; northern end of toll road
Irvine–Newport Beach line	14.00	22.53	14A	MacArthur Boulevard south – Newport Beach	Southbound exit and northbound entrance; former routing of SR 73 south
Newport Beach	14.35	23.09	14B	University Drive	Southbound exit and northbound entrance
Newport Beach	15.01	24.16	15	Jamboree Road	No northbound exit
Newport Beach	15.01	24.16	15	Birch Street	Northbound exit only
Newport Beach	15.53	24.99	16	Irvine Avenue / Campus Drive	Southbound exit and northbound entrance
Costa Mesa	16.53– 17.23	26.60– 27.73	17A	SR 55 north (Costa Mesa Freeway)	Northbound exit and southbound entrance; SR 55 south exit 5A
Costa Mesa	16.53– 17.23	26.60– 27.73	17B	SR 55 south (Costa Mesa Freeway)	Signed as exit 17A southbound; SR 55 north exits 5A-B
Costa Mesa	17.23	27.73	17C	Bear Street	Signed as exit 17B southbound
Costa Mesa	17.76– 17.95	28.58– 28.89	18B	Fairview Road	Northbound exit and southbound entrance
Costa Mesa	17.76– 17.95	28.58– 28.89	—	405 Express Lanes north	Northbound exit and southbound entrance; opened in December 2023
Costa Mesa	17.76– 17.95	28.58– 28.89	—	Susan Street / Harbor Boulevard	Northbound exit only; southbound access via I-405
Costa Mesa	17.76– 17.95	28.58– 28.89	18A	I-405 north (San Diego Freeway) – Long Beach	No access to I-405 south; northern terminus of SR 73; I-405 south exit 10
1.000 mi = 1.609 km; 1.000 km = 0.621 mi: Closed/former; Electronic toll collection; Incomplete access
