= Jamboree Road =

Arterial road in Orange County, California

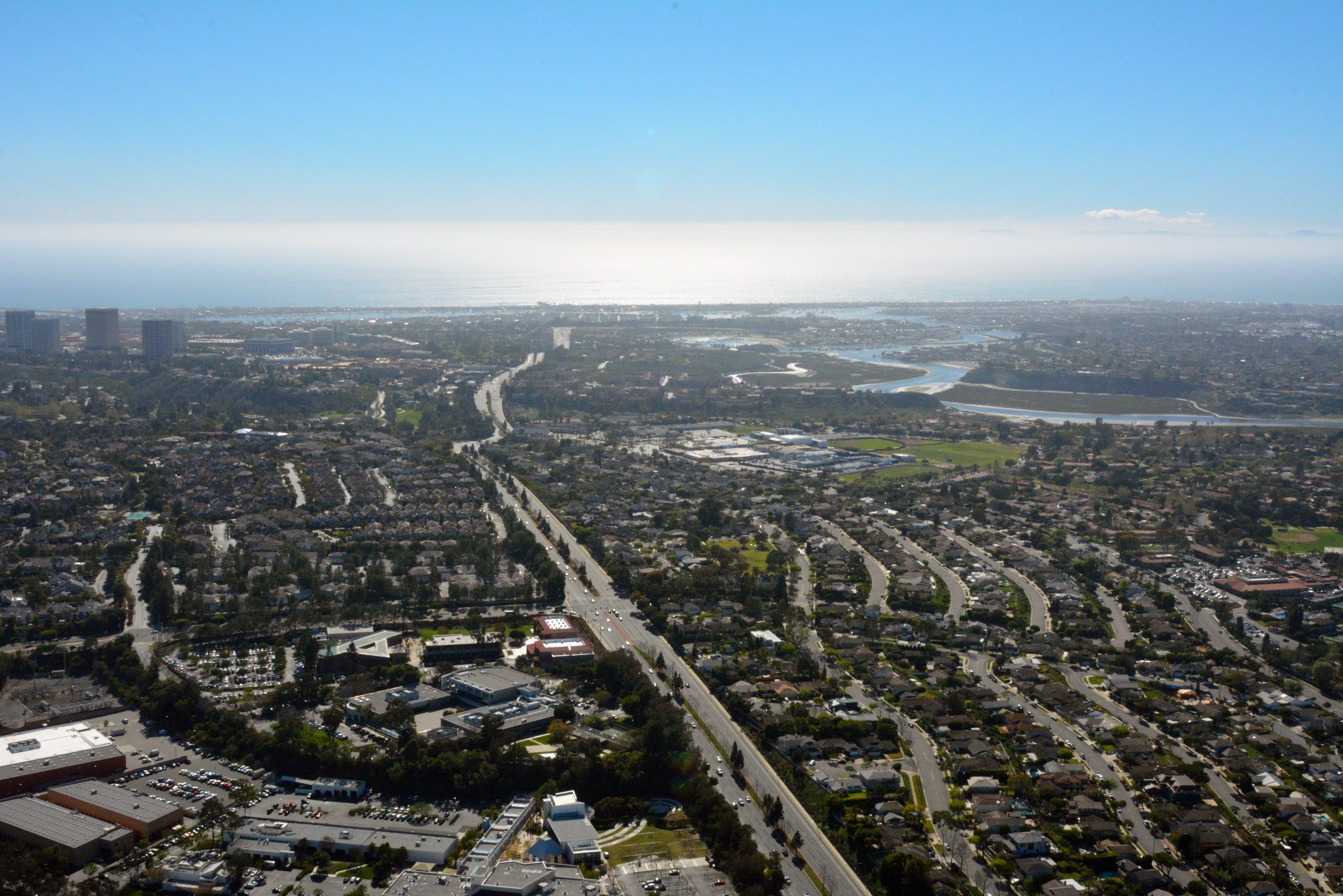
- Aerial view of Jamboree Road in Newport Beach, 2016
- Interactive map of Jamboree Road
- Namesake: The National Scout jamboree
- Length: 15.8 mi (25.4 km)
- Location: Orange County, California
- Coordinates: 33°42′10″N 117°48′30″W
- South end: Bayside Drive in Newport Beach
- Major junctions: SR 1 in Newport Beach; I-405 in Irvine SR 261 Toll in Irvine; I-5 in Irvine
- North end: Irvine Park Road in Orange

Jamboree Road is a 15.8-mile (25.4 km) long major arterial road through Orange County, California, running through the cities of Newport Beach, Irvine, Tustin, and Orange.

== Route description ==
The southern terminus of Jamboree Road is at Bayside Drive, immediately before Balboa Island. Its name changes to Marine Avenue as it makes the very short journey over the water that separates Balboa from Newport Beach. The road enters Irvine after the intersection with MacArthur Boulevard and continues into the Irvine urban core after the I-405 interchange. At Barranca Parkway, Jamboree Road becomes a freeway, with grade-separated intersections and limited right-of-way. As a freeway, Jamboree has exits at Warner Avenue, Edinger Avenue, and Walnut Avenue. After splitting with SR 261, Jamboree Road intersects I-5 and bisects the Irvine/Tustin Marketplace, the north side being Tustin and the south side being Irvine. It proceeds north through the foothills, crossing the Loma Ridge alongside SR 261 (the Eastern Transportation Corridor toll road) to its northern terminus in the City of Orange, at the intersection with Santiago Canyon Road (County Route S18).

Jamboree Road is heavily used by commuters who work at the Irvine Urban Core districts such as the IBC (Irvine Business Center) and the Irvine Towers.

== History ==
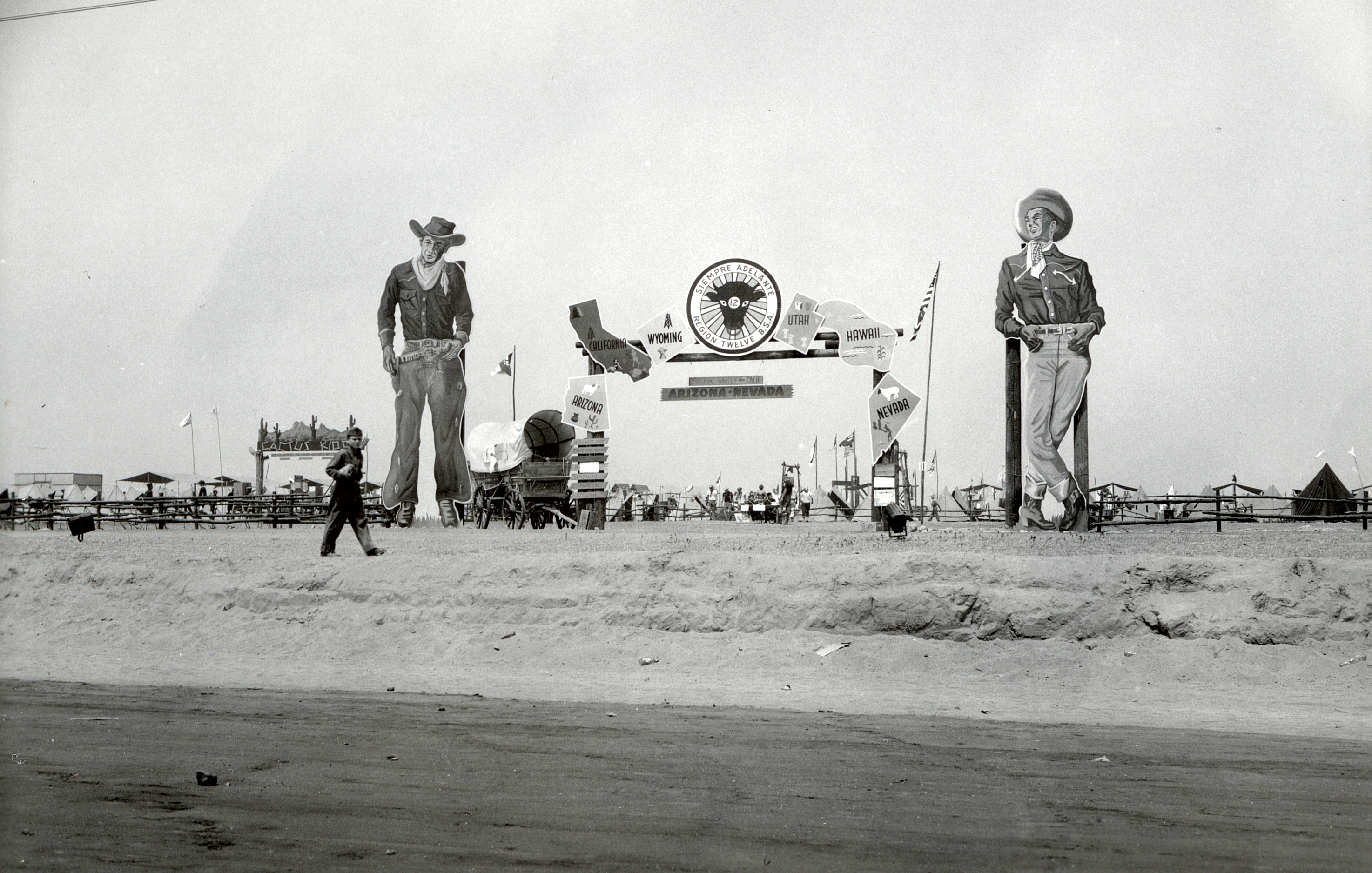
Region XII gateway at the national 1953 National Scout Jamboree

William H. Spurgeon III, a board member of the Orange County Council of the Boy Scouts, arranged for the Irvine Company to offer part of the Irvine Ranch as the site for the 1953 National Scout Jamboree. The event was held where Newport Center and Fashion Island now sit.

The Irvine Company helped build the road from a depot along the route of the San Diegan, a Los Angeles–San Diego service operated by the Santa Fe Railway. It was the third national jamboree, the first to be held west of the Mississippi River, and had 50,000 scouts from all 48 states and 16 foreign countries. Thousands of tents were pitched in the area accessible only by a muddy two-lane trail called Palisades Road (part of which is now the southern end of Bristol Avenue). The road was soon paved, and later the name was changed to Jamboree Road.

The current route of Jamboree Road follows the courses of four originally unconnected roads – these were, from south to north, the original stretch of Jamboree that extended from the present-day course of Bristol Street to Pacific Coast Highway, San Joaquin Road, Myford Road, and Peters Canyon Road.

== Future ==
Currently, Jamboree Road terminates at Santiago Canyon Road. Plans in the future with the city of Anaheim and The Irvine Company on the "Mountain Park" neighborhood call to extend Jamboree Road to Weir Canyon Road with an at-grade intersection. In addition, the plans call for Weir Canyon Road to be extended to SR 241 with a tolled exit and for Gypsum Canyon Road to be extended to Weir Canyon Road. The Jamboree extension would have a brief run through Irvine Regional Park and would run parallel to SR 241. The route would serve as an alternate route for drivers who use SR 55 and Imperial Highway (via Cannon Street) in Orange, which usually are congested during peak hours, and such an extension would reduce congestion along those roads.

Along with this project, the cities of Anaheim and Yorba Linda as well as Caltrans call for select toll lanes on SR 241 to connect with SR 91's toll lanes, which would be parallel to the proposed Weir Canyon Road exit and Mountain Park and would improve the congestion faced at the northern terminus on SR 241 when merging east. The toll connector is scheduled to start construction in 2025 and be complete by 2027, with it opening to traffic in 2028. However, this does not include an extension of Weir Canyon Road to SR 241.

However, in 2014, the Irvine Company donated 55,000 acres of land (including portions in the city of Anaheim) to the county of Orange to be preserved as open space. In 2018, the County voted to delete the Jamboree Road extension from Santiago Canyon to Weir Canyon Road from the master plan. However, in 2023, residents from the city of Orange mentioned potentially bringing the proposal back, citing increased congestion.

== Major intersections ==
The entire route is in Orange County. All exits are unnumbered.

Location	mi	km	Destinations	Notes
Newport Beach	0.0	0.0	Marine Avenue / Bayside Drive	Southern terminus; road continues as Marine Avenue
Newport Beach	0.2	0.32	SR 1 (Coast Highway)	Former US 101 Alt.
Newport Beach	3.5	5.6	SR 73 (Corona Del Mar Freeway) – San Diego, Long Beach	Exit 15 on SR 73
Irvine	5.5	8.9	I-405 (San Diego Freeway) – San Diego, Long Beach	Exit 7 on I-405
Irvine–Tustin line	7.0	11.3	South end of expressway	
Irvine–Tustin line	7.7	12.4	Warner Avenue / Park Avenue	
Irvine–Tustin line	8.5	13.7	Edinger Avenue	Southbound exit shares ramp with Walnut Avenue exit
Irvine–Tustin line	9.1	14.6	Walnut Avenue	
Irvine	9.3	15.0	SR 261 Toll north – Riverside	Southern terminus of SR 261; northbound left exit and southbound left entrance
Irvine	9.5	15.3	North end of expressway	
Irvine–Tustin line	9.7	15.6	I-5 (Santa Ana Freeway) – San Diego, Santa Ana	Exit 100 on I-5
Irvine–Tustin line	10.0	16.1	El Camino Real	
Orange	15.5	24.9	Chapman Avenue (CR S25 west) / Santiago Canyon Road east (CR S18 south) to SR 241 / SR 261	South end of CR S18 overlap; eastern terminus of CR S25
Orange	15.7	25.3	Santiago Canyon Road west (CR S18 north)	North end of CR S18 overlap
Orange	15.8	25.4	Irvine Park Lane	Continuation east beyond northern terminus
1.000 mi = 1.609 km; 1.000 km = 0.621 mi: Concurrency terminus; Electronic toll collection; Route transition
