= Central Turnpike =

Central Turnpike or Central Toll Road may refer to:

- The Central Turnpike (Massachusetts), a former toll road leading from Wellesley, Massachusetts southwest via Webster, Massachusetts to Connecticut
- The Everett Turnpike in New Hampshire, also known as the Central New Hampshire Turnpike
- The Central Turnpike System, the unofficial joint designation for the Kansas Turnpike, the Turnpikes of Oklahoma, and the Toll roads in Texas, as toll collection systems in those three states are interoperable with one another

== See also ==
- Eastern Turnpike
