= California State Route 133 =

Highway in California

State Route 133
- SR 133 highlighted in red

Route information
- Maintained by Caltrans and TCA
- Length: 13.635 mi (21.943 km)
- History: State highway in 1933; SR 133 in 1964

Major junctions
- South end: SR 1 in Laguna Beach
- CR S18 in Laguna Beach; SR 73 Toll in Laguna Beach; I-405 in Irvine; I-5 in Irvine
- North end: SR 241 Toll near Irvine

Location
- Country: United States
- State: California
- Counties: Orange

Highway system
- State highways in California; Interstate; US; State; Scenic; History; Pre‑1964; Unconstructed; Deleted; Freeways
← SR 132	→ SR 134

State Route 133 (SR 133) is a state highway in the U.S. state of California, serving as an urban route in Orange County. It connects SR 1 in Laguna Beach through the San Joaquin Hills with several freeways in Irvine, ending at the SR 241, a toll road in the latter city. It is built as an expressway from SR 73 to Laguna Canyon Road (just south of I-405 in Irvine), and past this, SR 133 is a freeway (the Laguna Freeway) to I-5, and a tollway (part of the Eastern Transportation Corridor operated by the Transportation Corridor Agencies) to SR 241 near the Santa Ana Mountains.

SR 133 was constructed as a county road by the 1910s; the portion from I-405 to I-5 was upgraded to a freeway four decades later. The state canceled plans to extend the freeway segment south, and the southern part of the road remains an undivided highway. In 1998, most of the Eastern Transportation Corridor opened, and the connector between I-5 and SR 241 was designated as a toll extension of SR 133.

== Route description ==
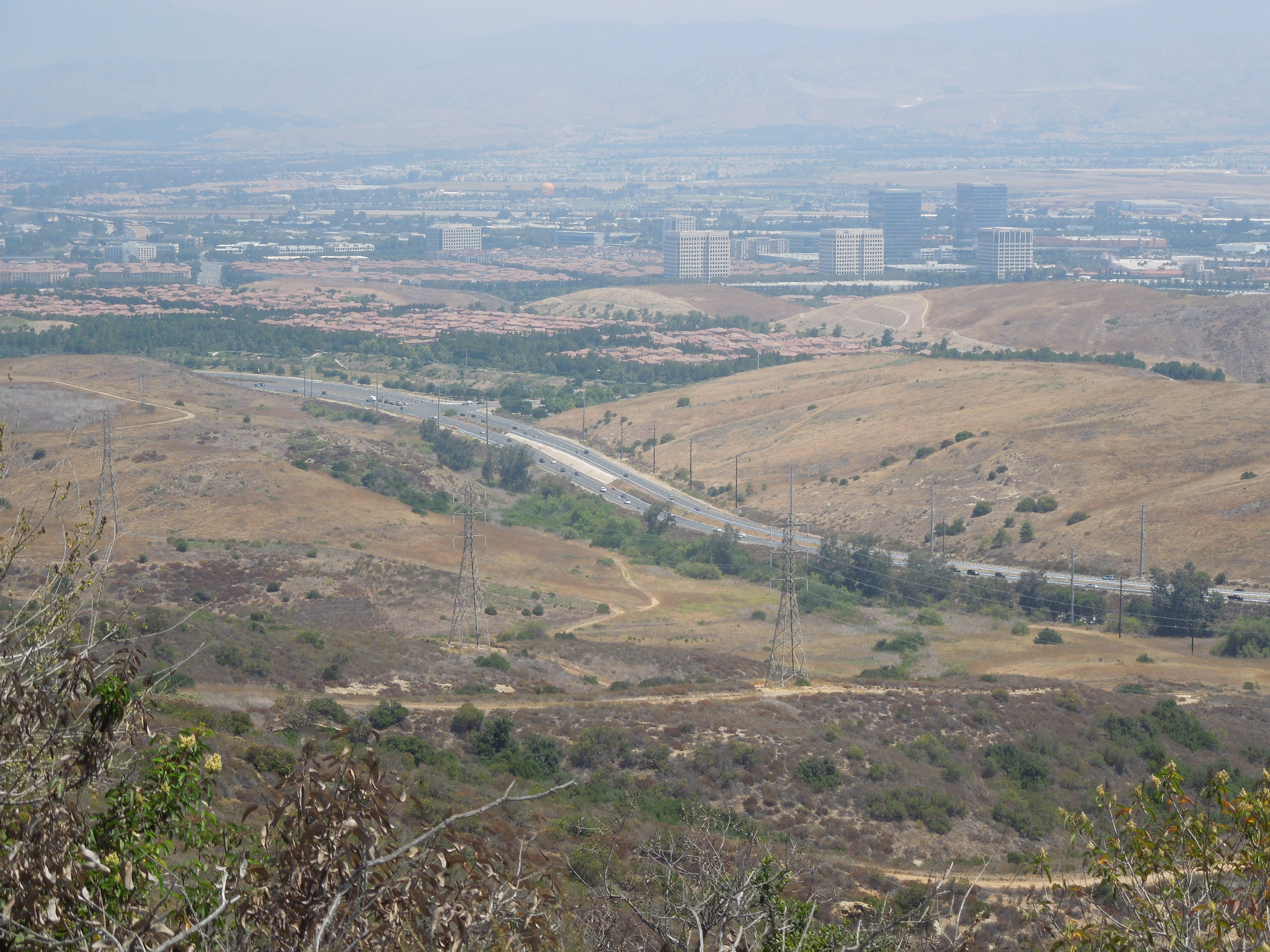
CA SR 133 south of Lake Forest Drive, from Serrano Ridge (unincorporated).

Route 133 is defined in section 433 of the California Streets and Highways Code, and that the highway is "from Route 1 near Laguna Beach to Route 241". In addition, section 433.1 permits the state to relinquish control of the segment in Laguna Beach between Route 1 to El Toro Road to the city.

SR 133 begins at SR 1, the Pacific Coast Highway, as Broadway in Laguna Beach, a block from the Pacific Ocean. The name changes to Laguna Canyon Road as the highway leaves downtown Laguna Beach and enters Laguna Canyon, soon narrowing to one lane in each direction. After entering the canyon, which lies between Laguna Coast Wilderness Park (west side of SR 133) and Aliso and Wood Canyons Wilderness Park (east side of SR 133), the first major intersection is with El Toro Road (CR S18). SR 133 widens to four lanes and becomes an expressway after its interchange with SR 73, the San Joaquin Hills Toll Road.

As it continues through the Laguna Coast Wilderness Park, SR 133 follows a four-lane alignment on the west side of the canyon, moved from the old three-lane road in the center of the canyon in late 2006. Laguna Canyon Road splits to the northwest where the canyon ends in Irvine. North of the park, the highway becomes the Laguna Freeway at its interchange with I-405, the San Diego Freeway. SR 133 then continues as a freeway and serves Barranca Parkway and the I-5, the Santa Ana Freeway. After crossing I-5, SR 133 becomes part of the Eastern Transportation Corridor along the northwest side of Orange County Great Park (built on the site of the decommissioned Marine Corps Air Station El Toro), crossing an interchange with Irvine Boulevard at exit 12 before ending at SR 241.

SR 133 is part of the California Freeway and Expressway System north of SR 73, and is part of the National Highway System, a network of highways that are considered essential to the country's economy, defense, and mobility by the Federal Highway Administration.

== History ==
As part of its construction of concrete roads, started by a 1913 bond issue, Orange County paved the county road through Laguna Canyon, connecting State Highway Route 2 (the forerunner of US 101 and I-5) at Irvine with Laguna Beach, by 1917. The road was added to the state highway system in 1933 as Route 185, an unsigned designation. The entire route was added to the new California Freeway and Expressway System in 1959; the planned upgrade had already been named the Laguna Freeway by the California Highway Commission on November 26, 1957. The highway received a sign route number—State Route 133—in the 1964 renumbering.

The opening of the first—and only—piece of the Laguna Freeway was celebrated in Laguna Beach on October 1, 1952, connecting the north end of Laguna Canyon with a planned extension of the Santa Ana Freeway at a trumpet interchange and bypassing the old route on Sand Canyon Avenue. Other than the interchange at I-405, no other access was present along the Laguna Freeway between Laguna Canyon Road and I-5 until ramps connecting to and from Barranca Parkway were completed in August 1990. The state decided not to build the remainder of the freeway in late 1975, and in 1996 the portion south of SR 73 was removed from the Freeway and Expressway System. Widening of the part north of SR 73 to a four-lane expressway was completed in late 2006, moving the road out of the canyon bottom and allowing better access to areas in Laguna Coast Wilderness Park.

A new SR 231 was added to the state highway system in 1988, connecting I-5 northwest of Irvine with SR 91, and in 1991 the south end was shifted southeast to the north end of SR 133, with the old route becoming SR 261. To prevent the route from changing numbers as it crossed I-5, the southern portion was renumbered SR 133 in 1996, with the remainder becoming an extended SR 241. The Eastern Transportation Corridor, which includes SR 133 north of I-5, was completed on October 15, 1998, opening a new shortcut from Orange County to the northeast.

== Tolls ==
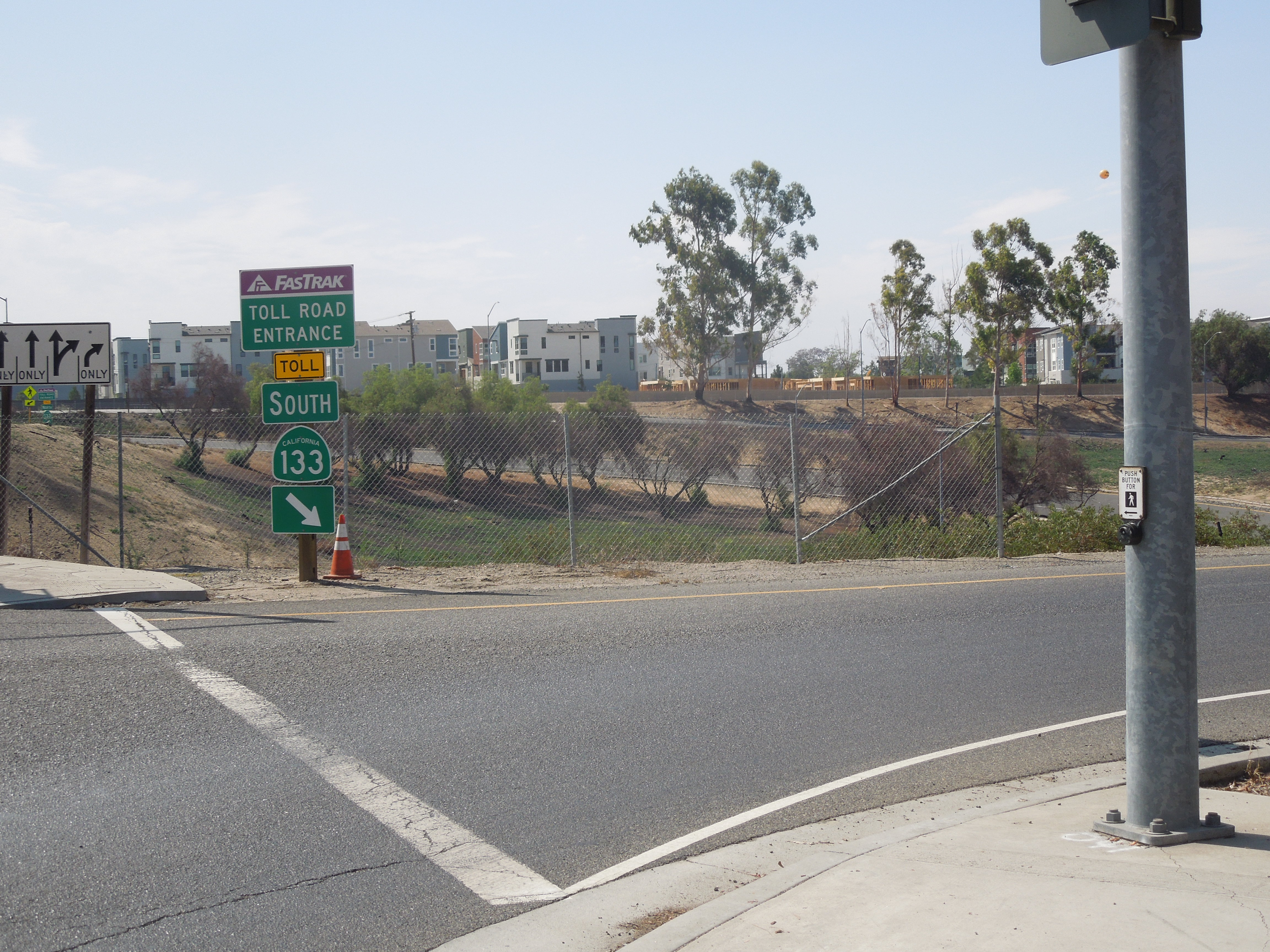
Southbound entrance to SR 133 at Irvine Blvd.

The tolled portion of SR 133 (from I-5 in the south to SR 241 in the north) employs a barrier toll system, where drivers are charged flat-rate tolls based on what particular toll booths they pass through. Since May 13, 2014, the road has been using an all-electronic, open road tolling system. And on October 2, 2019, the license plate tolling program, under the brand name "ExpressAccount", was discontinued. Drivers may still pay using the FasTrak electronic toll collection device, or via a one time payment online 5 days before or after their trip on the toll road. Drivers who do not pay after 5 days will be assessed an additional toll violation penalty.

Tolls are collected at the northbound exit and southbound entrance of Irvine Boulevard and at the Orange Grove toll gantry, the latter of which spans the on-and off-ramps to SR 241 north (traffic to and from SR 241 south instead, pay at the Tomato Springs toll gantry located on SR 241 immediately south of the SR 241 interchange). As of July 2026, the standard two-axle car toll for both the northbound offramp and southbound onramp of Irvine Boulevard is a flat rate of $2.28. The Orange Grove toll gantry instead uses a variable pricing scheme based on the time of day for FasTrak users (it is not truly congestion priced because toll rates come from a preset schedule and are not based on actual congestion); non-FasTrak drivers must pay the $3.78 maximum toll regardless of the day and time.

== Major intersections ==
Except where prefixed with a letter, postmiles were measured on the road as it was in 1964, based on the alignment that existed at the time, and do not necessarily reflect current mileage. Postmile prefixes include: R reflecting a realignment in the route since then, M indicating a second realignment, L referring to an overlap due to a correction or change, and T indicating postmiles classified as temporary. Segments that remain unconstructed or have been relinquished to local control may be omitted. The entire route is in Orange County.

Location	Postmile	Exit	Destinations	Notes
Laguna Beach	0.00		SR 1 (Pacific Coast Highway) – San Clemente, Newport Beach	Southern terminus of SR 133; SR 1 was former US 101 Alt.
Laguna Beach	3.42		CR S18 north (El Toro Road) to SR 73 south – Aliso Viejo, Lake Forest, Laguna Hills, Laguna Woods	Southern terminus of CR S18
Laguna Beach			SR 73 Toll / El Toro Road (CR S18) – San Diego, Long Beach	No northbound access to SR 73 south; SR 73 north exit 6, south exit 7
Irvine			Lake Forest Drive	
Irvine	7.71		Laguna Canyon Road / Pavona Street	
Irvine	7.71	South end of freeway		
Irvine	8.38	8A	I-405 south (San Diego Freeway) – San Diego	Signed as exit 8 northbound; I-405 exit 2
Irvine	8.38	8B	I-405 north (San Diego Freeway) – Long Beach	Signed as exit 8 northbound; I-405 exit 2
Irvine	8.93	9	Barranca Parkway	
Irvine	9.57	10A	I-5 south (Santa Ana Freeway) – San Diego	Southbound exit and northbound entrance; I-5 north exit 95
Irvine	9.57	10B	I-5 north (Santa Ana Freeway) – Santa Ana	Signed as exit 10 northbound; last free exit for northbound traffic; I-5 south exits 95-96B; former US 101
Irvine	11.90	12	Irvine Boulevard	Tolled northbound exit and southbound entrance
	13.64	14A	SR 241 Toll south (Foothill Toll Road) – Santa Margarita	SR 241 north exit 27
	13.64	Orange Grove toll gantry		
	13.64	14B	SR 241 Toll north (Foothill Toll Road) – Riverside	Northern terminus of SR 133; SR 241 south exit 27
1.000 mi = 1.609 km; 1.000 km = 0.621 mi: Electronic toll collection; Incomplete access
