= California State Route 241 =

Highway in California

State Route 241 Toll
- SR 241 highlighted in red; Los Patrones Pkwy in blue

Route information
- Maintained by Caltrans and TCA
- Length: 24.534 mi (39.484 km)
- Existed: 1993–present

Major junctions
- South end: Oso Parkway and Los Patrones Parkway near Las Flores
- SR 133 Toll near Irvine SR 261 Toll in Orange
- North end: SR 91 at the Anaheim–Yorba Linda line

Location
- Country: United States
- State: California
- Counties: Orange

Highway system
- State highways in California; Interstate; US; State; Scenic; History; Pre‑1964; Unconstructed; Deleted; Freeways
← SR 238	→ SR 242

State Route 241 (SR 241) is one of the two state highways in California that are controlled-access toll roads for their entire lengths (the other being SR 261, both in Orange County and operated by the Transportation Corridor Agencies). SR 241's southern half from near Las Flores to near Irvine is the Foothill Transportation Corridor, while its northern half to SR 91 on the Anaheim–Yorba Linda border forms part of the Eastern Transportation Corridor system with SR 133 and SR 261.

SR 241 is the most elevated highway in Orange County and provides scenic views of both the Santa Ana Mountains and the cities below, passing through 12 different cities and regions along its length.

Legislatively, SR 241 is defined to run south to I-5 at San Onofre State Beach on the border with San Diego County. A plan to construct this portion was opposed due to environmental concerns. The county maintains the toll-free Los Patrones Parkway that extends the right-of-way south to Rancho Mission Viejo, but local officials do not intend to hand over control of the parkway to the state.

== Route description ==
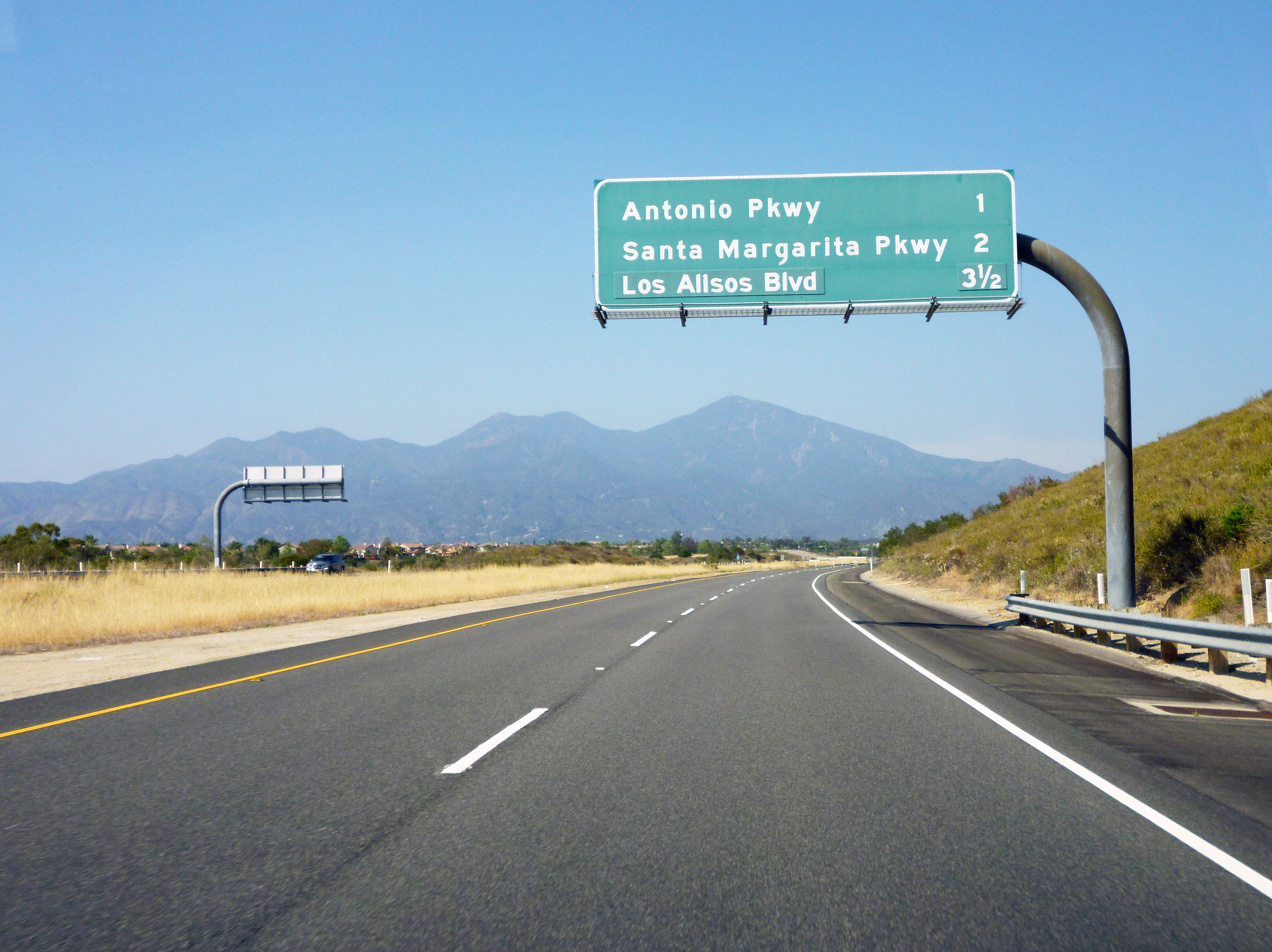
SR 241 northbound in Rancho Santa Margarita.

Route 241 is defined in section 541 of the California Streets and Highways Code, and that the highway is "from Route 5 south of San Clemente to Route 91 in the City of Anaheim". It includes the proposed southern extension to Route 5 that was never constructed.

SR 241 runs along two named tollways: its southern half is the 12-mile (19 km) Foothill Transportation Corridor, and its northern half is part of the Eastern Transportation Corridor.

The toll road begins at its interchange with Oso Parkway near Las Flores, while the right-of-way continues south as Los Patrones Parkway. SR 241 then heads northward through Rancho Santa Margarita and Trabuco Canyon near O'Neill Regional Park. It then passes through the eastern areas of Mission Viejo and Lake Forest before paralleling the rugged foothills in Irvine. It then runs along the easternmost edge of Irvine, with scenic views on either side, before meeting the eastern terminus of SR 133. SR 241 continues north as part of the Eastern Transportation Corridor following this interchange. SR 241 then meets SR 261 and Santiago Canyon Road (CR S18) near Irvine Lake before turning northeastward towards its northern terminus at SR 91 on the Anaheim–Yorba Linda border near the Santa Ana River.

SR 241 is part of the California Freeway and Expressway System, as well as the National Highway System, a network of highways that are considered essential to the country's economy, defense, and mobility by the Federal Highway Administration.

== History ==
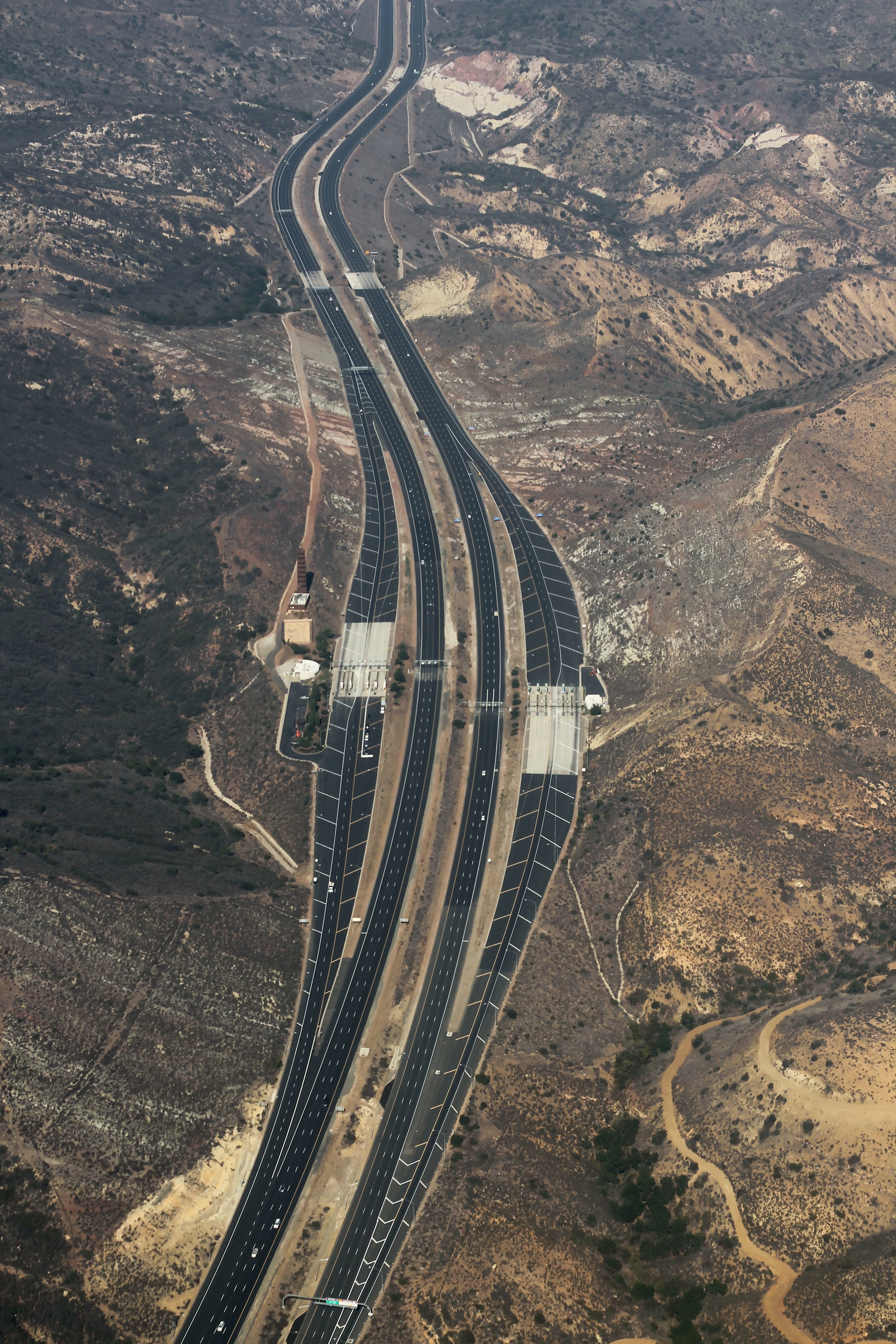
Windy Ridge Toll Plaza

The original SR 241 designation became part of SR 47.

The SR 241 toll road was constructed by the Transportation Corridor Agencies, also known as the TCA, and is owned by the state of California. Construction was financed with bonds, which are repaid with toll revenues. Taxpayers are not responsible for repaying any debt if toll revenues fall short.

== Future ==
=== Proposed extension ===
SR 241 was planned to extend from its current southern terminus at Oso Parkway south to I-5 at the San Diego County border near San Onofre. This southern extension, known as Foothill-South, was intended to be the final piece in Orange County's planned 67-mile (108 km) network of public toll roads. The extension would have provided an alternate route from SR 91 to I-5 for those traveling from Riverside County and through southeast Orange County, south to San Diego County.

Proponents of the project included a coalition of chambers of commerce, who argued it would provide greater access for communities such as Foothill Ranch, Rancho Santa Margarita, Las Flores, Coto de Caza, Wagon Wheel and Rancho Mission Viejo. Transportation Corridor Agencies (TCA) originally projected that traffic would increase 60 percent by 2025, and estimated that Foothill-South would alleviate traffic on I-5 by 2.6 to 8 percent. The proposed route was selected by a collaborative group that included the Federal Highway Administration, Environmental Protection Agency, Fish & Wildlife Service, the Army Corps of Engineers and Caltrans. Initially, the plan would have placed the final 4 miles (6.4 km) of the roadway on Camp Pendleton Marine Base, as well as through a section of San Onofre State Beach, which is leased from the United States Marine Corps. The Marine Corps reserved the right to grant easements for rights of way when the lease with the California Department of Parks and Recreation was signed in 1971. Eventually, spokespeople from Camp Pendleton would deny permission to build the road on the base but approved the road's construction through the portion of the base that hosts the state park. The TCA Board of Directors, local elected officials who represent the areas adjacent to the toll road routes, certified the project's Environmental Impact Report in 2006.

Many conservationists, environmental groups, and some residents of San Clemente opposed the extension to San Onofre State Beach. Former California Attorney General Bill Lockyer filed two lawsuits in 2006, one on behalf of the Native American Heritage Commission. A third lawsuit was filed by a coalition of several groups, including Sierra Club, the Surfrider Foundation, Natural Resources Defense Council. It was later revealed that the TCA funded a study in support of removing the California gnatcatcher from the federal Endangered Species list, which would have made it easier to build the toll road extension.

On February 6, 2008, the California Coastal Commission voted 8-2 to reject the planned extension through San Onofre State Beach. The TCA appealed the Coastal Commission's decision to the U.S. Secretary of Commerce. On December 18, 2008, the Department of Commerce announced that it would uphold the California Coastal Commission's ruling that found the TCA's proposed extension inconsistent with the California Coastal Act. In a release issued by the Department of Commerce, the DOC noted that at least one reasonable alternative to the project existed, and that the project was not necessary in the interest of national security.

In November 2016, the TCA reached a legal settlement ending the 15-year dispute with the more than a dozen environmental organizations and the state of California. The settlement guaranteed that any roadway would avoid the Donna O'Neill Land Conservatory, the San Onofre State Beach Park, and other environmentally sensitive areas. The environmental organizations have agreed not to sue the TCA over other potential alignments that connect the 241 Toll Road to the I-5 freeway as long as the alignments do not enter the "environmental avoidance area."

=== Los Patrones Parkway ===
Rancho Mission Viejo, which has publicly condemned all the proposed alignments of the SR 241 extensions, helped to fund the construction of a 4.5-mile (7.2 km) four-lane toll-free freeway known as Los Patrones Parkway. The road, maintained by Orange County, follows the exact alignment as the proposed Tesoro Extension of SR 241 between Oso Parkway and Cow Camp Road. Rancho Mission Viejo provided $85 million of the total estimated cost of $100 million to construct the road. Los Patrones Parkway also includes a new multi-purpose pathway on the west side of the highway between Oso Parkway and Chiquita Canyon Drive, two wildlife crossings under the road, wildlife fencing, and replanting of over 100 acres of vegetation. However, local environmental groups expressed concerns that the TCA may acquire Los Patrones Parkway in the future to extend SR 241 southward.

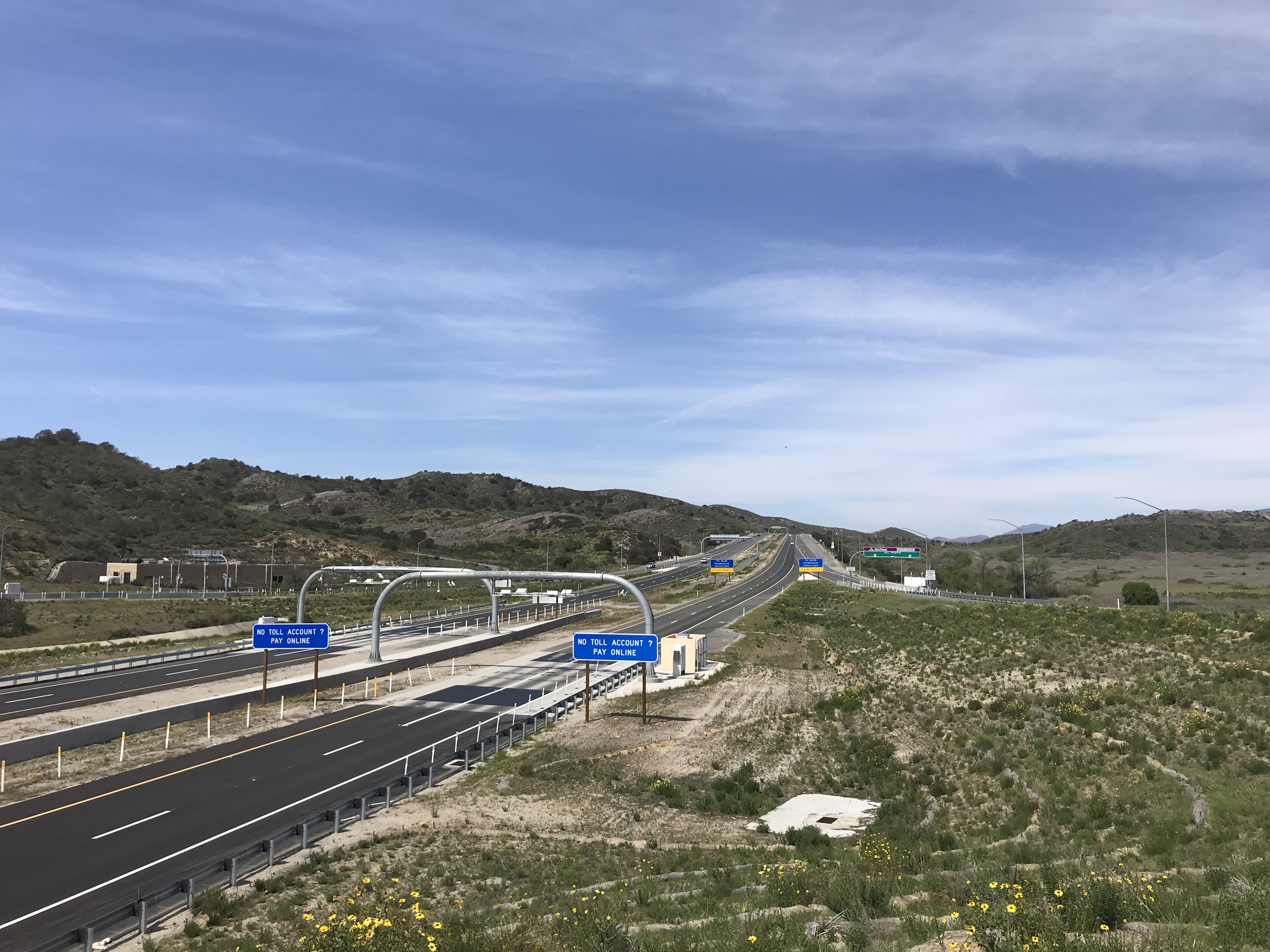
View looking north from Oso Parkway as Los Patrones Parkway transitions into SR 241 in unincorporated Orange County.

On August 10, 2018, the Orange County Public Works began construction on a $30 million project to turn a section of Oso Parkway into a bridge to allow a direct connection between SR 241 and Los Patrones Parkway. The new interchange was completed in mid-January 2021.

Los Patrones Parkway was built in two phases. Phase 1 of the road between Oso Parkway and Chiquita Canyon Drive opened on September 12, 2018. However, due to significant rainfall, the opening of Phase 2 of the road between Chiquita Canyon Drive and Cow Camp Road was delayed twice from the planned deadline of late-2018, and did not open until October 17, 2019.

Meanwhile, the TCA continued to explore alternative options to extend the toll road through San Juan Capistrano and San Clemente to I-5. After facing opposition, the TCA Board of Directors voted unanimously on March 12, 2020, to support a proposal to extend the county's toll-free Los Patrones Parkway south to Avenida La Pata near the San Clemente city limit.

In 2021, state senator Patricia Bates introduced Senate Bill 760 to remove the segment between Oso Parkway and I-5 segment from SR 241's legal definition, which would permanently kill any plan to convert Los Patrones Parkway to a toll road or any other plan to extend SR 241. Exit numbers assigned at SR 241 remain starting at 14 instead of 1 or 0, assuming there would still be an extension to I-5.

=== SR 241 to SR 91 Express Lane Connector ===
The cities of Anaheim and Yorba Linda as well as Caltrans call for select toll lanes on SR 241 to connect with SR 91's toll lanes. The connector will connect northbound SR 241 lanes with eastbound SR 91 express lanes, and westbound SR 91 express lanes with southbound SR 241 lanes. When SR 241 was constructed, there was room left in the middle should the connector come in the future. The toll connector is scheduled to start construction in 2025 and be complete by 2027, with it opening to traffic in 2028.

== Tolls ==
SR 241 employs a barrier toll system, where drivers are charged flat-rate tolls based on what particular toll booths they pass through. Since May 13, 2014, the road has been using an all-electronic, open road tolling system. And on October 2, 2019, the license plate tolling program, under the brand name "ExpressAccount", was discontinued. Drivers may still pay using the FasTrak electronic toll collection device, or via a one time payment online 5 days before or after their trip on the toll road. Drivers who do not pay after 5 days will be assessed an additional toll violation penalty.

There are two mainline toll gantries: the Tomato Springs gantry just south of the SR 133 interchange, and the Windy Ridge gantry just south of the SR 91 interchange. As of July 2026, both gantries and the northbound exit and southbound entrance at Portola Parkway-North use a variable pricing scheme based on the time of day for FasTrak users (it is not truly congestion priced because toll rates come from a preset schedule and are not based on actual congestion); non-FasTrak drivers must pay the maximum toll ($4.76 at Windy Ridge, $4.55 at Tomato Springs, and $3.42 at Portola Parkway-North) regardless of the day and time. Tolls are also collected at a flat rate for all drivers at selected on-and off-ramps: the southbound exits and northbound entrances of Los Patrones Parkway and Oso Parkway (both $2.79), and Antonio Parkway ($1.97); and the northbound exits and southbound entrances of Los Alisos Boulevard ($1.84), Portola Parkway-South ($1.97), and Alton Parkway ($2.91).

== Exit list ==
Under the official exit list by Caltrans, mileage is measured from the unconstructed southern terminus at Interstate 5 near San Clemente. The entire route is in Orange County.

Location	mi	km	Exit	Destinations	Notes
Las Flores	14.55	23.42	—	Los Patrones Parkway south	Continuation beyond Oso Parkway; Oso Bridge toll gantry immediately north of the Oso Parkway overpass
Las Flores	14.55	23.42	14	Oso Parkway	Tolled southbound exit and northbound entrance
Rancho Santa Margarita	17.54	28.23	18	Antonio Parkway	Tolled southbound exit and northbound entrance
Rancho Santa Margarita	18.49	29.76	19	Auto Center Drive / Santa Margarita Parkway	Auto Center Drive not signed northbound
Rancho Santa Margarita–Mission Viejo line	20.08	32.32	20	Los Alisos Boulevard	Tolled northbound exit and southbound entrance
Lake Forest	21.80	35.08	22A	Portola Parkway	Signed as exit 22 northbound; tolled northbound exit and southbound entrance
Lake Forest	22.44	36.11	22B	Lake Forest Drive	Southbound exit and northbound entrance
Lake Forest	23.42	37.69	23	Alton Parkway	Tolled northbound exit and southbound entrance
Irvine	24.97	40.19	25	Portola Parkway – Irvine	Tolled northbound exit and southbound entrance
			Tomato Springs toll gantry		
	27.43	44.14	27	SR 133 Toll south to I-5	Tolled southbound exit and northbound entrance; northern terminus of SR 133; SR 133 north exits 14A-B
Orange	32.54	52.37	33	Santiago Canyon Road (CR S18) / Chapman Avenue (CR S25) to SR 261 Toll south	“To SR 261” not signed southbound
Orange	32.64	52.53	32	SR 261 Toll south – Irvine	Northbound access from exit 33; northern terminus of SR 261; SR 261 north exit 6B
	36.10	58.10	Windy Ridge toll gantry		
Anaheim–Yorba Linda line	39.08	62.89	—	91 Express Lanes east	Scheduled to be completed by 2029
Anaheim–Yorba Linda line	39.08	62.89	39A	SR 91 east (Riverside Freeway) – Riverside	Northern terminus of SR 241; SR 91 east exit 40, west exit 41B
Anaheim–Yorba Linda line	39.08	62.89	39B	SR 91 west (Riverside Freeway) – Los Angeles	Northern terminus of SR 241; SR 91 east exit 40, west exit 41B
1.000 mi = 1.609 km; 1.000 km = 0.621 mi: Electronic toll collection; Incomplete access; Unopened

=== Los Patrones Parkway exits ===
This exit list consists of the county-maintained Los Patrones Parkway that local officials do not intend to turn over to Caltrans or TCA for a possible extension of the SR 241 toll road. Thus, the state maintains no postmiles. The entire route is in Orange County.

Location	mi	km	Exit	Destinations	Notes
Rancho Mission Viejo				Cow Camp Road	At-grade intersection
Rancho Mission Viejo				Chiquita Canyon Drive	Southbound exit and northbound entrance
Las Flores			14	Oso Parkway	Northbound exit and southbound entrance; last free northbound exit before start of SR 241
Las Flores				SR 241 Toll north – Riverside	Continuation beyond Oso Parkway
1.000 mi = 1.609 km; 1.000 km = 0.621 mi: Electronic toll collection; Incomplete access
