= California State Route 261 =

State highway toll road in Orange County, California, United States

State Route 261 Toll
- Eastern Transportation Corridor
- SR 261 highlighted in red

Route information
- Maintained by Caltrans and TCA
- Length: 6.2 mi (10.0 km)
- Existed: 1991 –present

Major junctions
- South end: Walnut Avenue and Jamboree Road in Irvine
- North end: SR 241 Toll near Orange

Location
- Country: United States
- State: California
- Counties: Orange

Highway system
- State highways in California; Interstate; US; State; Scenic; History; Pre‑1964; Unconstructed; Deleted; Freeways
← SR 260	→ SR 262

State Route 261 (SR 261) is a state highway that forms part of the Eastern Transportation Corridor toll road system in Orange County, California that is operated by the Transportation Corridor Agencies. It runs from Walnut Avenue and Jamboree Road in Irvine north to SR 241. North of this interchange, SR 241 becomes part of the Eastern Transportation Corridor. SR 261 parallels Jamboree Road for its entire length. SR 261 does not directly connect with I-5 in Irvine, as Jamboree Road and other streets must be used to make the connection.

== Route description ==
Route 261 is defined in section 561 of the California Streets and Highways Code, and that the highway is "from Walnut Avenue in the City of Irvine to Route 241".

The southern end of SR 261 is in Irvine, splitting from Jamboree Road near Walnut Avenue, while Jamboree continues south as a locally maintained divided highway to Barranca Parkway. SR 261 then runs north parallel to Jamboree Road towards Santiago Canyon Road (CR S18) in the city of Orange near Irvine Lake. While Jamboree Road has an interchange with I-5, SR 261 does not and instead passes underneath the interstate without any connecting ramps. The toll road then continues next to The Market Place, an outdoor shopping center straddling the border of Irvine and Tustin, before going through a toll plaza after the Irvine Boulevard interchange. Following this is the Portola Parkway exit, after which SR 261 passes through hilly, wilderness terrain alongside the Irvine Village of Orchard Hills to the east and the border with Tustin to the west. After the final exit with Santiago Canyon Road in Orange, SR 261 merges with SR 241, which continues north towards SR 91.

SR 261 is part of the California Freeway and Expressway System, and is part of the National Highway System, a network of highways that are considered essential to the country's economy, defense, and mobility by the Federal Highway Administration.

== History ==
State Route 231
- Location: Irvine-Anaheim (1988-1996)
- Existed: 1988–1996

From 1965 to 1972, a segment of present-day SR 162 was defined as SR 261.

The California State Legislature added SR 231 to the state highway system in 1988; it was a route from I-5 around the Tustin–Irvine boundary to SR 91. In 1991, the Legislature renumbered part of SR 231 to be SR 261. Five years later, SR 231 was renumbered to SR 241, and the southern terminus with I-5 was changed to become Walnut Avenue.

== Tolls ==
SR 261 employs a barrier toll system, where drivers are charged flat-rate tolls based on what particular toll booths they pass through. Since May 13, 2014, the road has been using an all-electronic, open road tolling system. And on October 2, 2019, the license plate tolling program, under the brand name "ExpressAccount", was discontinued. Drivers may still pay using the FasTrak electronic toll collection device, or via a one time payment online 5 days before or after their trip on the toll road. Drivers who do not pay after 5 days will be assessed an additional toll violation penalty.

There is one mainline toll gantry at Irvine Ranch. As of July 2026, the gantry uses a variable pricing scheme based on the time of day for FasTrak users (it is not truly congestion priced because toll rates come from a preset schedule and are not based on actual congestion); non-FasTrak drivers must pay the $3.60 maximum toll regardless of the day and time. Tolls are also collected at a flat rate at selected on-and off-ramps: Irvine Boulevard's northbound onramp ($2.91), northbound offramp ($2.28), and southbound onramp ($2.28) (free on southbound offramp); and Portola Parkway ($2.91, free on the northbound offramp).

== Exit list ==
The entire route is in Orange County.

Location	mi	km	Exit	Destinations	Notes
Irvine	0.00	0.00	–	Jamboree Road south	Continuation beyond Walnut Avenue
Irvine	0.00	0.00	1	Walnut Avenue / Edinger Avenue	Southern terminus
Irvine	0.24	0.39	–	Jamboree Road to I-5	Northbound exit and southbound entrance; last free northbound exit before toll road begins
Irvine	1.64	2.64	2	Irvine Boulevard	Tolled northbound exit and all entrances
Irvine			Irvine Ranch toll gantry		
Irvine	2.85	4.59	3	Portola Parkway	Tolled southbound exit and all entrances
Orange	6.04	9.72	6A	Santiago Canyon Road (CR S18) / Chapman Avenue (CR S25) to SR 241 Toll south	Northbound exit and southbound entrance; SR 241 exit 33
Orange	6.21	9.99	6B	SR 241 Toll north (Eastern Transportation Corridor)	Northern terminus; SR 241 south exit 32
1.000 mi = 1.609 km; 1.000 km = 0.621 mi: Electronic toll collection; Incomplete access
