= Eastern Toll Road =

Eastern Toll Road or Eastern Turnpike may refer to the following toll roads:

== United States ==
- The Eastern Transportation Corridor, the tollway system in California, comprising portions of:
  - State Route 133
  - State Route 241
  - State Route 261
- The Eastern Turnpike, the system in New Hampshire, comprising:
  - Blue Star Turnpike
  - Spaulding Turnpike
- The Eastern Turnpike System, the continuous tolled highway from Illinois to New Jersey, comprising (from west-to-east):
  - Chicago Skyway segment of I-90
  - Indiana Toll Road
  - Ohio Turnpike
  - Pennsylvania Turnpike
  - New Jersey Turnpike Pearl Harbor Memorial Extension

== Others ==
- N17 East Toll Road in South Africa
- Ufa Eastern Toll Road, the road-construction project in Russia

== See also ==
- Central Turnpike
