= Barrier toll system =

Method of collecting tolls on highways

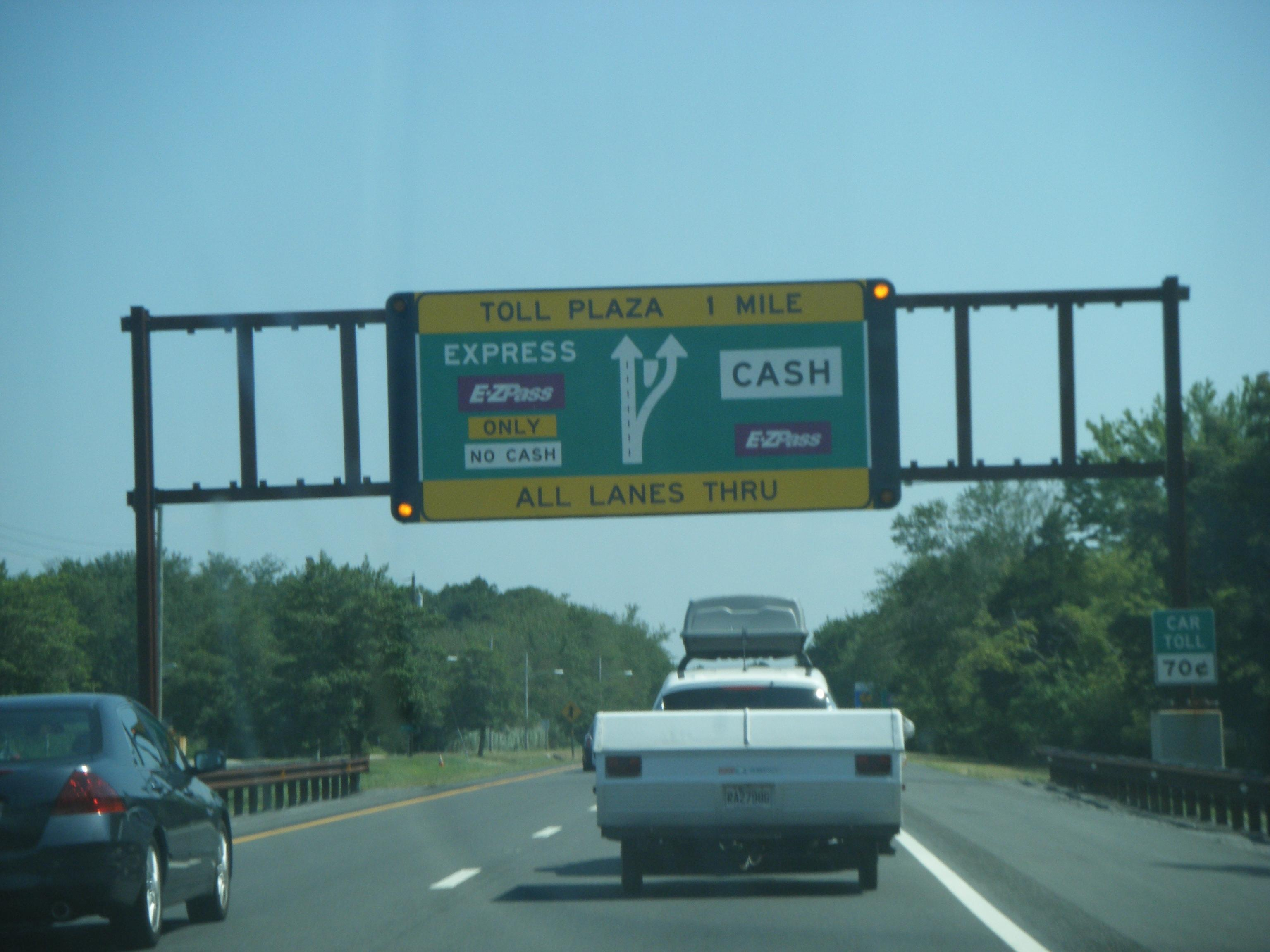
The Garden State Parkway northbound approaching the Cape May barrier toll plaza in New Jersey. At the time of the photograph, the toll plaza had a 70-cent toll for cars.

A barrier toll system (also known as an open toll system) is a method of collecting tolls on highways using toll barriers at regularly spaced intervals on the toll road's mainline. Motorists are typically charged a flat-rate toll, unlike toll roads with a ticket system where the toll rate is determined by the distance traveled or number of exits passed. Some highways use coin-drop machines on toll plazas. For toll roads whose ramps have no toll plazas, it is possible to exit the toll road before the mainline toll plaza, use local streets to bypass it, then re-enter the highway via an interchange on the other side of the toll plaza. Thus it is possible to drive on some barrier toll roads while paying less or not paying at all; this is the basis of the "open" descriptor.

There are two main methods by which planners may prevent such toll evasion. One method is to simply remove highway entrances after and exits before toll plazas, so that detouring around toll plazas becomes such an inconvenience that most users will not bother. Another method is to place toll plazas on exits before and entrances after mainline toll barriers, so that all users will always have to pay at least one toll, regardless of entry or exit point. The second method is sometimes called a "barrier-ramp" system; it can be deemed open or closed, respectively, depending upon whether it is consistently applied to all entrances and exits, or only some of them. Examples of the second method may be found on the Everett Turnpike, the Garden State Parkway, and the Autostrada dei Laghi.

The barrier toll system can create more congestion than the ticket system, since it forces all motorists to stop for several toll plazas each time they travel down the highway. Open road tolling can alleviate this issue by allowing most users to proceed through the barrier at full speed.

== Highways where used ==
The following is a list of some toll roads that use the barrier system:

- Maine Turnpike
- Everett Turnpike
- Blue Star Turnpike (only one barrier exists for both directions of traffic in Hampton, plus the interchange with NH 101 also in Hampton)
- Garden State Parkway
- Delaware Route 1
- Delaware Turnpike (only one barrier exists for both directions of traffic in Newark)
- West Virginia Turnpike
- Indiana Toll Road (between the Illinois state line and Portage toll barrier; a ticket system is used from the Portage toll barrier to the Ohio state line)
- Ohio Turnpike (barrier tolls collected in both directions at Westgate and westbound at Eastgate; a ticket system is used between Swanton and Newton Falls)

== Highways that formerly used the barrier system ==
- Atlantic City Expressway—entire length (replaced by open road tolling on January 4, 2026)
- Connecticut Turnpike - Entire length (tolls removed in 1985)
- Dallas North Tollway—entire length (replaced by open road tolling on December 11, 2010)
- New England Thruway (replaced by open road tolling on December 19, 2018)
- President George Bush Turnpike—entire length (replaced by open road tolling on July 1, 2009)
- Spaulding Turnpike (replaced by open road tolling in October 2022)
- Camino Colombia Toll Road—entire length for its duration as a privately owned toll road from the late 1990s until 2004.
- The Illinois Tollway system (replaced by all-electronic tolling in 2020)
