= Interstate 5 in California =

Interstate Highway in California

Interstate 5
- I-5 highlighted in red

Route information
- Maintained by Caltrans
- Length: 796.77 mi (1,282.28 km)
- History: Completed October 12, 1979
- Tourist routes: Volcanic Legacy Scenic Byway; West Side Freeway from SR 152 near Santa Nella to I-580 near Tracy
- NHS: Entire route

Major junctions
- South end: Fed. 1 / Fed. 1D at the Mexican border in San Diego
- SR 15 in San Diego; I-8 in San Diego; SR 1 in Dana Point; I-10 / US 101 / SR 60 in Los Angeles; SR 99 at various locations; I-580 near Tracy; US 50 / I-80 BL in Sacramento; I-80 in Sacramento; SR 299 in Redding; US 97 in Weed
- North end: I-5 at the Oregon state line towards Ashland, OR

Location
- Country: United States
- State: California
- Counties: San Diego, Orange, Los Angeles, Kern, Kings, Fresno, Merced, Stanislaus, San Joaquin, Sacramento, Yolo, Colusa, Glenn, Tehama, Shasta, Siskiyou

Highway system
- Interstate Highway System; Main; Auxiliary; Suffixed; Business; Future; State highways in California; Interstate; US; State; Scenic; History; Pre‑1964; Unconstructed; Deleted; Freeways
← SR 4	→ US 6

Interstate 5 (I-5) is a major north–south route of the Interstate Highway System in the United States, running largely parallel to the Pacific Coast between the Mexican border and the Canadian border. The segment of I-5 in California runs across the length of the state from the Mexican border at the San Ysidro Port of Entry in the San Ysidro neighborhood of San Diego to the Oregon state line south of the Medford-Ashland metropolitan area. It is the longest interstate in California at 796.77 miles (1,282.28 km), and accounts for more than half of I-5's total length of 1,381.29 miles (2,222.97 km). It is also the second longest stretch of Interstate Highway (and the longest for a north-south Interstate) with a single designation within a single state after I-10 in Texas.

It is the most-used of the two major north–south routes on the Pacific Coast, the other being U.S. Route 101 (US 101), which is primarily coastal. I-5 links the major California cities of San Diego, Santa Ana, Los Angeles, Stockton, Sacramento, and Redding. The San Francisco Bay Area is about 80 miles (130 km) west of the highway.

I-5 is known colloquially as "the 5" to Southern California residents and "5" to Northern California residents due to variations in California English. I-5 also has several named portions: the John J. Montgomery Freeway, San Diego Freeway, Santa Ana Freeway, Golden State Freeway, and West Side Freeway.

== Route description ==
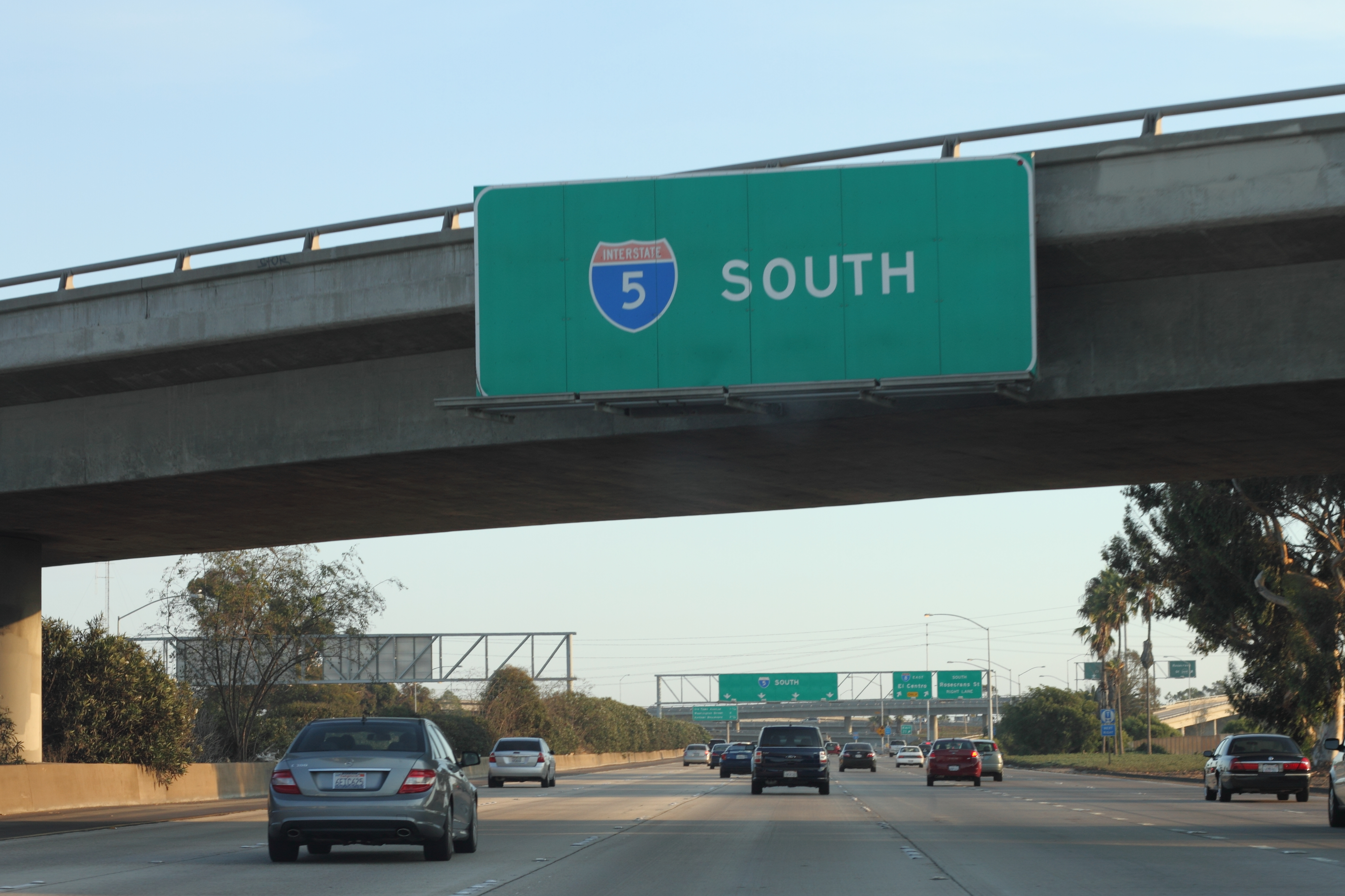
I-5 southbound in San Diego toward Mexico, September 2012

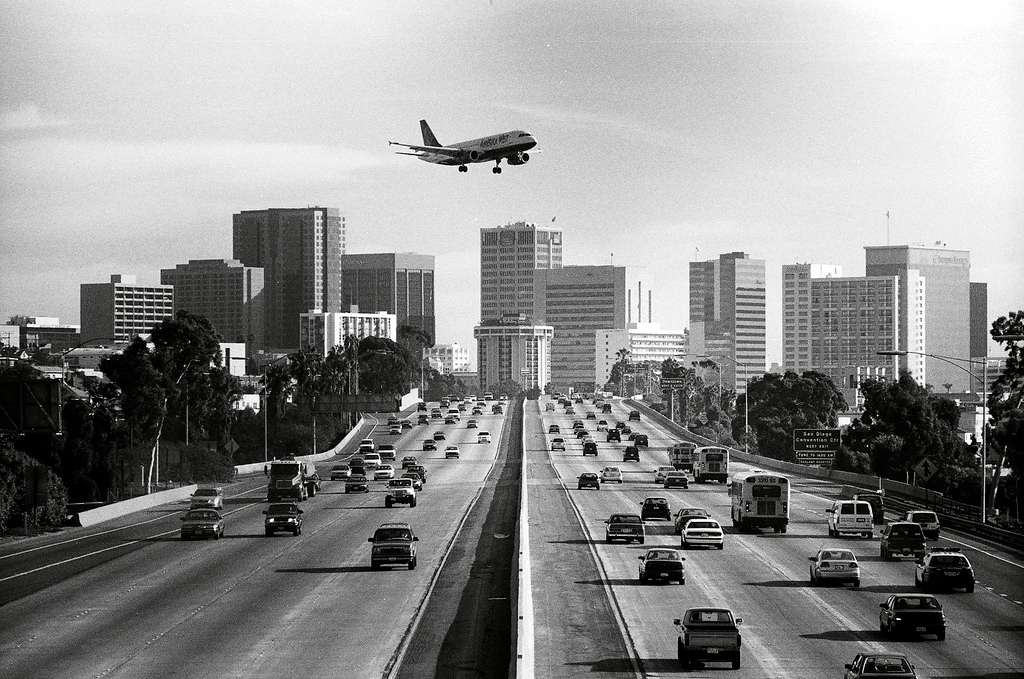
I-5 looking south toward Downtown San Diego, January 2002

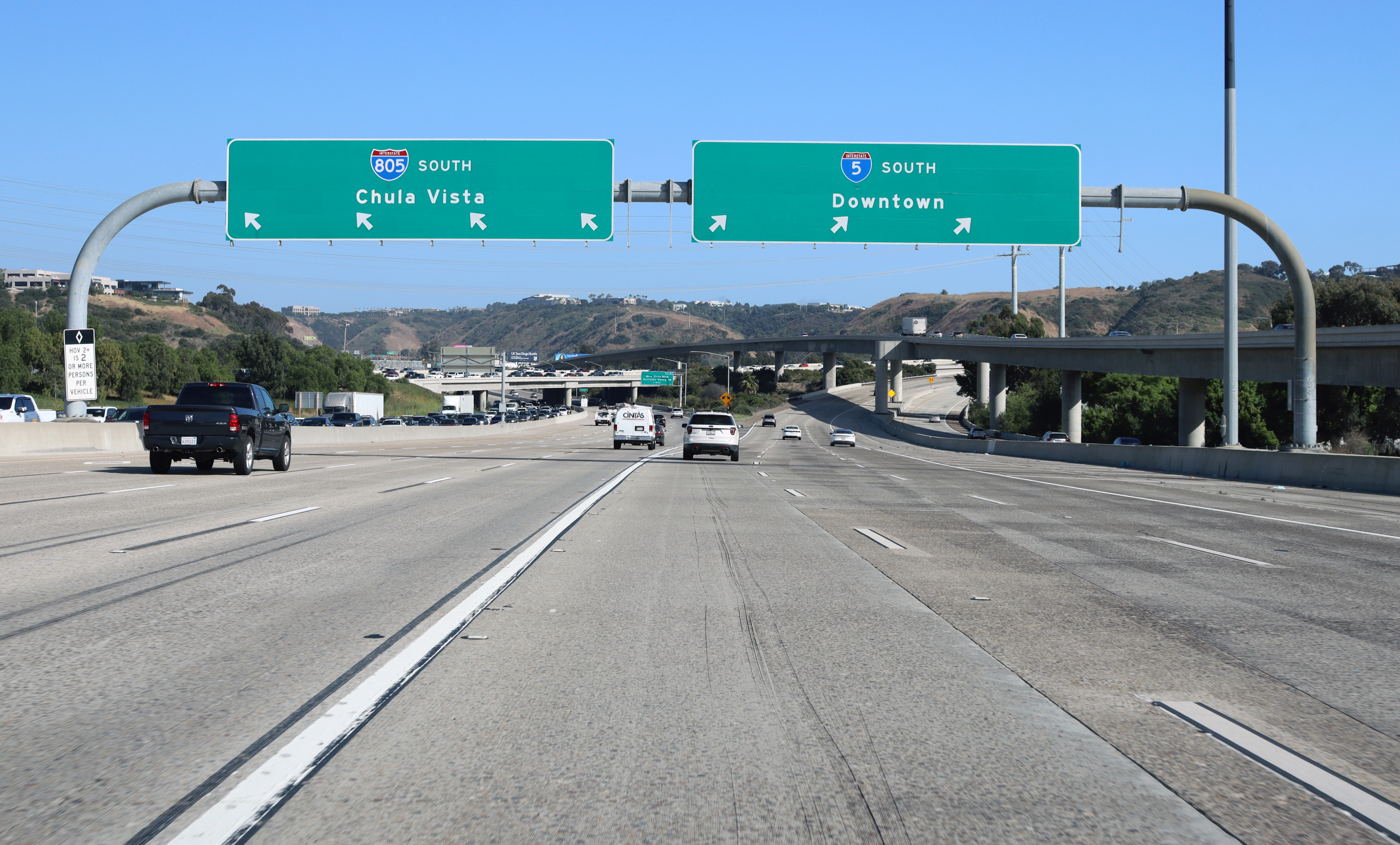
I-5 looking south at I-805 split

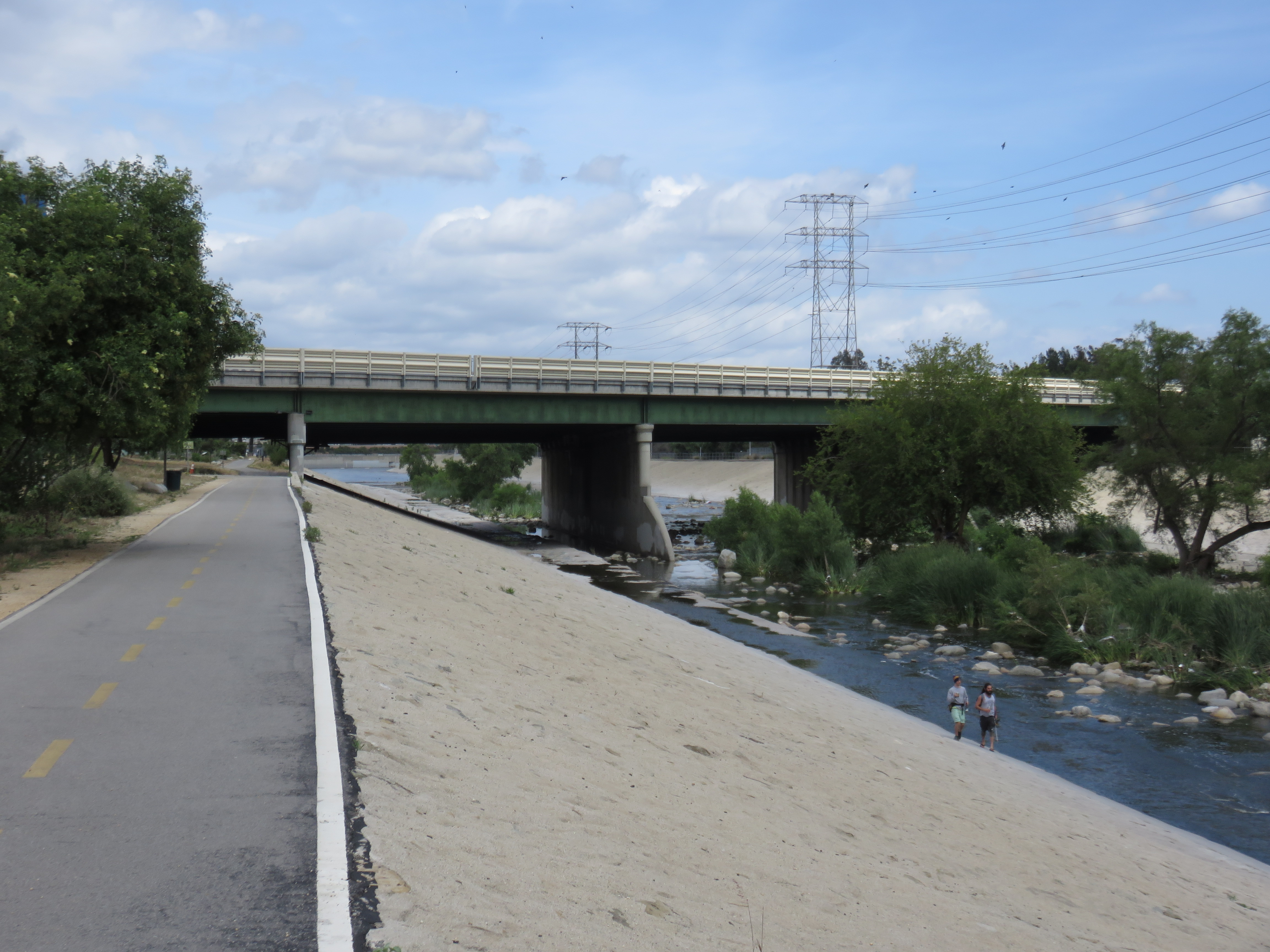
I-5 crosses the Los Angeles River twice; the northern of these is on the border between Los Angeles and Glendale

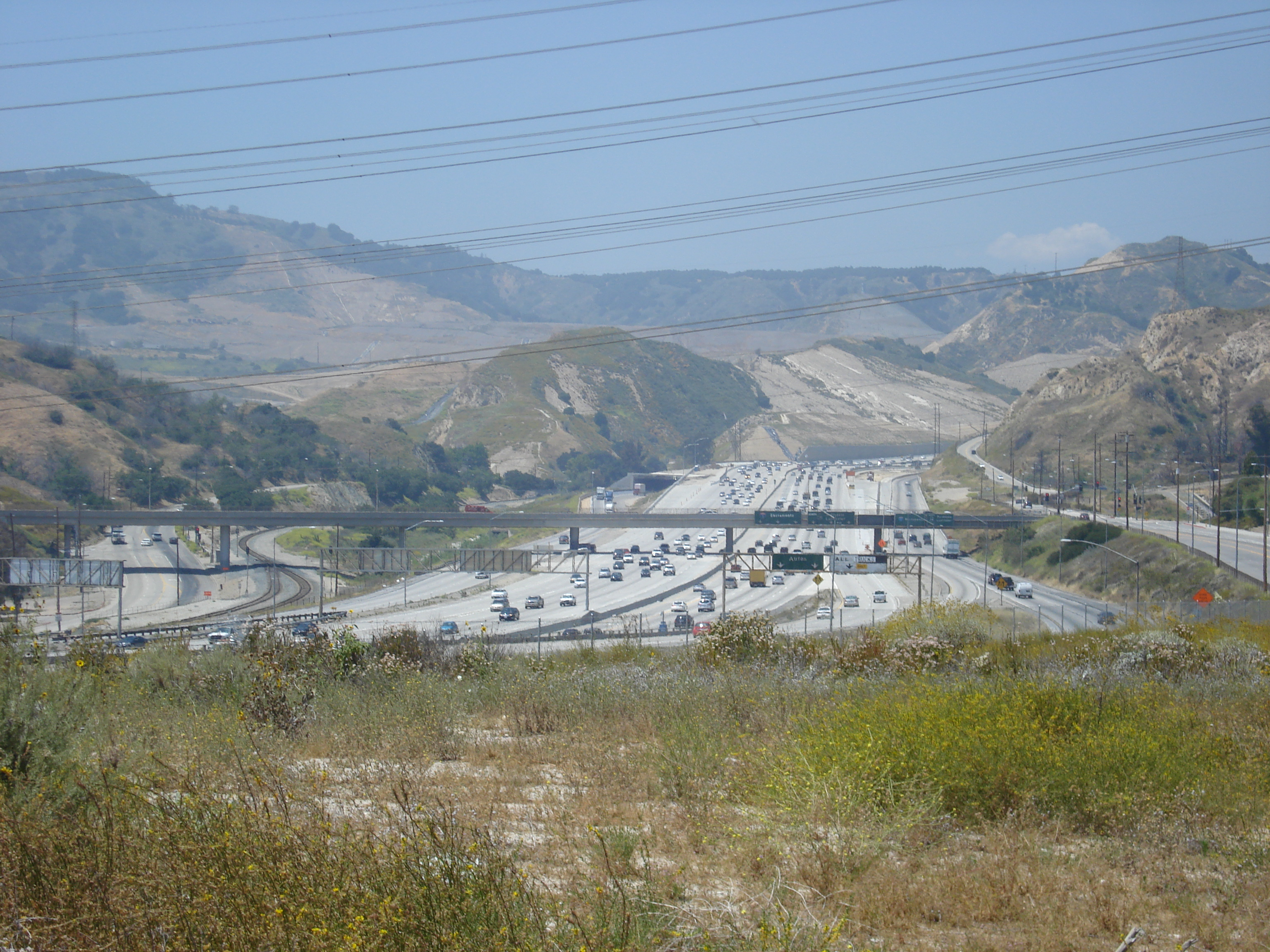
I-5 in the Newhall Pass Interchange, where it meets I-210 and SR 14 in northern Los Angeles

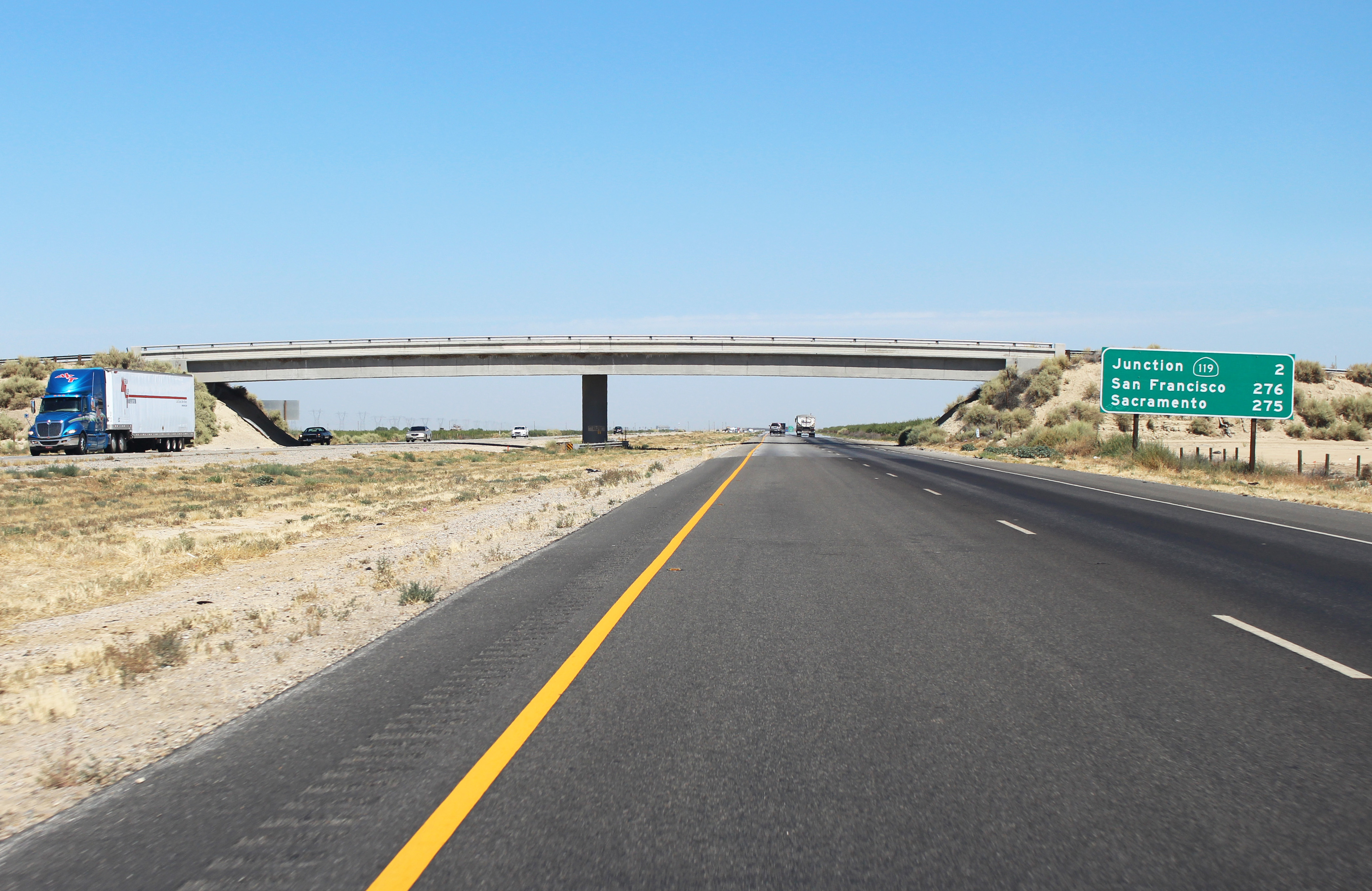
I-5 in the Central Valley, facing northbound near Millux, California

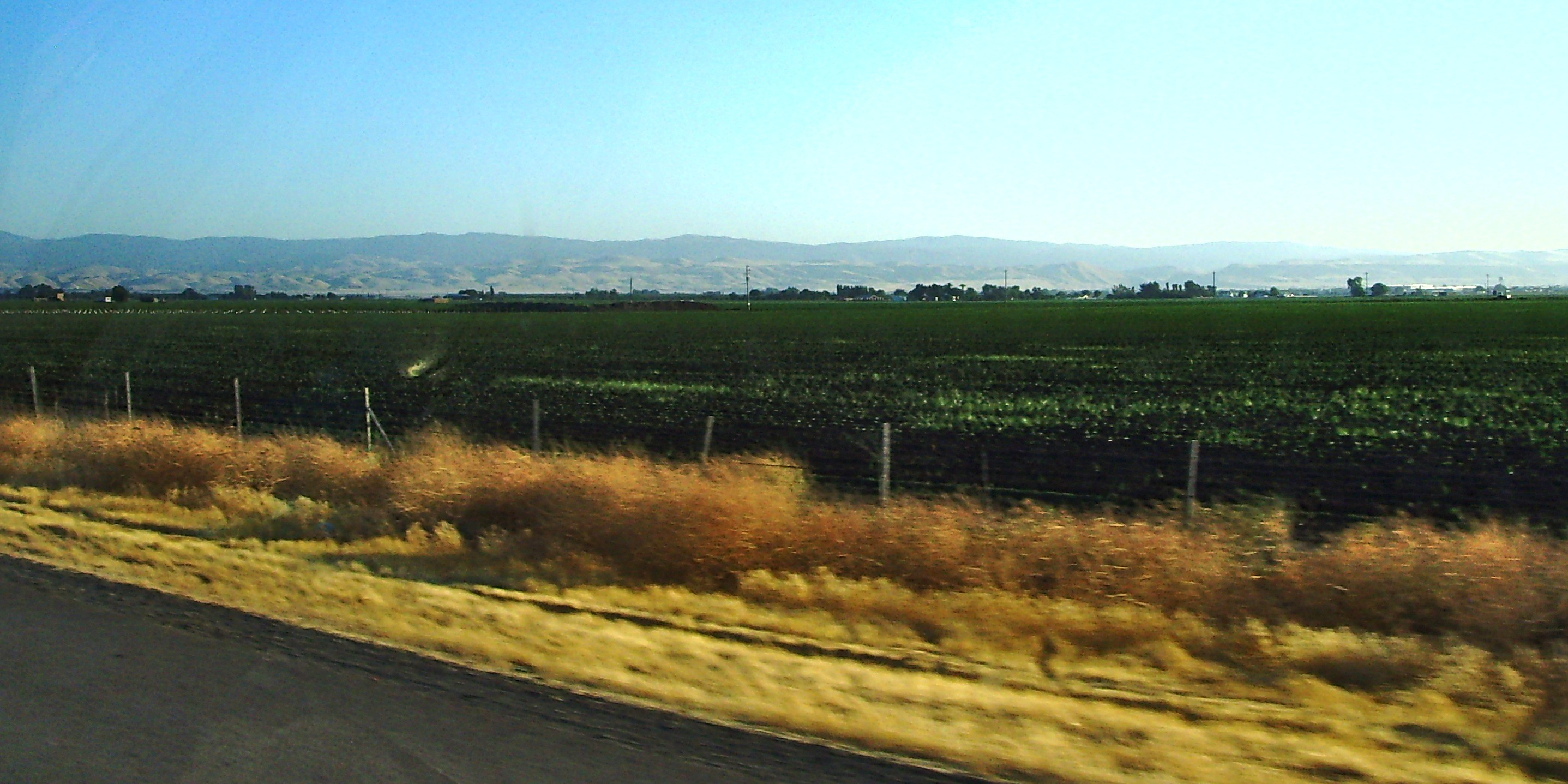
I-5 in the Central Valley between Tracy and Patterson

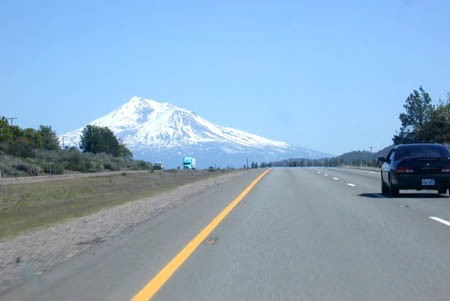
I-5 southbound approaching Weed and Mount Shasta

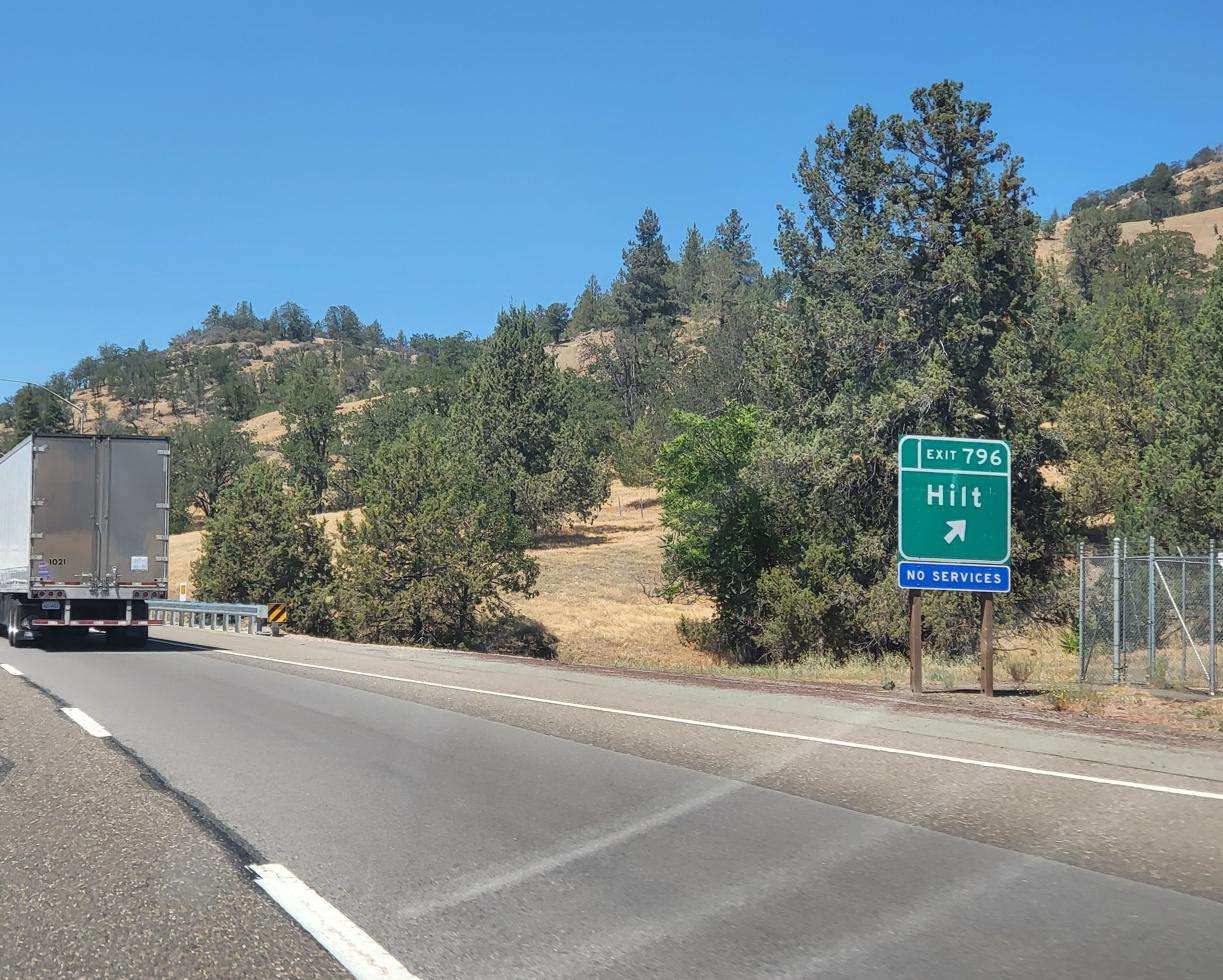
Hilt (exit 796) is the last exit before the Oregon state line

The entirety of Interstate 5 in California is defined in section 305 of the California Streets and Highways Code as Route 5:

Route 5 is from the international boundary near Tijuana to the Oregon state line via National City, San Diego, Los Angeles, the westerly side of the San Joaquin Valley, Sacramento, and Yreka; also passing near Santa Ana, Glendale, Woodland, and Red Bluff.

This definition corresponds with the Federal Highway Administration (FHWA)'s route logs of I-5.

I-5 is part of the California Freeway and Expressway System, and is part of the National Highway System, a network of highways that are considered essential to the country's economy, defense, and mobility by the Federal Highway Administration. The segment of I-5 from State Route 89 (SR 89) to US 97 forms part of the Volcanic Legacy Scenic Byway, an All-American Road. I-5 is also eligible to be included in the State Scenic Highway System; however, it is a scenic highway as designated by the California Department of Transportation (Caltrans) only from SR 152 to I-580.

=== San Diego County ===
I-5 begins at the San Ysidro Port of Entry from Mexico in the San Ysidro neighborhood of San Diego. Immediately after the border, I-805 splits off to the northeast and serves as a bypass of I-5 that avoids downtown San Diego. I-5 itself continues northwest and meets the western end of SR 905, a route that connects with the Otay Mesa border crossing. I-5 then continues northward and joins the southern end of SR 75, a highway connecting to Coronado via the Silver Strand. I-5 then enters Chula Vista, briefly leaving the San Diego city limits. It continues along the east side of San Diego Bay where it intersects with SR 54 and enters National City. From there, I-5 veers around Naval Base San Diego and reenters the city limits of San Diego. I-5 subsequently intersects with four state routes: the southern end of SR 15, which continues the I-15 corridor, SR 75 and the Coronado Bridge, the western end of SR 94, and SR 163. In addition to serving downtown San Diego, I-5 also provides access to Balboa Park from the Pershing Drive exit. The portion of I-5 from the Mexican border to SR 94 at downtown San Diego is named the John J. Montgomery Freeway in honor of John J. Montgomery, a pioneer aviator who flew a glider from a location near Chula Vista in 1884.

I-5 continues northwest from downtown as the San Diego Freeway until it reaches its junction with I-8, then turns slightly to the north while passing SeaWorld and Mission Bay. Thereafter, I-5 intersects the western end of SR 52 near La Jolla before entering University City. At Nobel Drive, the San Diego LDS Temple towers over I-5. Shortly afterward, I‑5 passes through the UC San Diego campus and intersects the northern terminus of I-805 before continuing north and intersecting the western end of SR 56. At this interchange, there is a local bypass that provides the only access to Carmel Mountain Road from both directions and provides the only direct access to SR 56 going northbound.

North of the San Diego city limits, I-5 enters the city limits of Solana Beach, and then three incorporated cities to the north: Encinitas, Carlsbad and Oceanside. In Oceanside, I-5 intersects the SR 78 freeway and the SR 76 expressway and continues through Camp Pendleton. It then follows the Pacific Ocean coastline for the next 18 mi (29 km). Toward the northern end of its routing through Camp Pendleton, I-5 passes through San Onofre State Beach and near the San Onofre Nuclear Generating Station. I-5 enters Orange County at the Cristianitos Road exit.

=== Orange County ===
Upon entering Orange County, I-5 goes through San Clemente. At Dana Point, I-5 turns inland while SR 1 continues along the coast. I-5 then heads due north through San Juan Capistrano and Mission Viejo, intersecting the SR 73 toll road heading northwest. I-5 continues to the El Toro Y interchange with I-405 in southeastern Irvine, splitting into lanes for regular traffic as well as for truck traffic (though autos can use these lanes as well). From that point, I-405 takes over the San Diego Freeway designation, while I-5 becomes the Santa Ana Freeway as it runs southeast to northwest.

After the El Toro Y junction, I-5 intersects SR 133, a toll road that eventually connects to SR 241. Just before the Tustin city limits, I-5 passes over SR 261, the final toll road of the Eastern Transportation Corridor, but traffic must use Jamboree Road to access the latter. I-5 then intersects SR 55 and enters Santa Ana, the county seat of Orange County. Towards the northern side of Santa Ana, I-5 intersects both SR 57 and SR 22 in what is known as the Orange Crush interchange. Following this, I-5 briefly enters the city of Orange and then traverses Anaheim, passing along the north side of Disneyland. I-5 then intersects SR 91, passes through Buena Park and crosses into Los Angeles County.

=== Los Angeles County ===
After crossing the county line, I-5 goes through several cities southeast of Los Angeles, including La Mirada, Santa Fe Springs, and Norwalk. In Downey, I-5 intersects I-605, which serves as a north–south connector route between the cities east of Los Angeles, including those in the San Gabriel Valley. I-5 then enters Commerce, passing the Citadel Outlets shopping center, and intersects I-710 before entering the large unincorporated community of East Los Angeles and later the city proper of Los Angeles. When the freeway reaches the East Los Angeles Interchange 1 mi (1.6 km) east of downtown Los Angeles, I-5 becomes the Golden State Freeway as US 101 takes over the Santa Ana Freeway designation. At this interchange, I-10, SR 60, and US 101 intersect; I-10 continues north on I-5 for about 2 mi (3.2 km) before continuing east towards San Bernardino and points farther east.

On the north side of downtown, the Golden State Freeway follows the Los Angeles River, intersects SR 110 and SR 2 and passes along the eastern side of Griffith Park. The route continues through the San Fernando Valley, intersecting the Ventura Freeway (SR 134). It briefly enters the city of Glendale and then Burbank, passing near Burbank Airport before reentering the Los Angeles city limits and intersecting the northern end of the Hollywood Freeway (SR 170). Near the city of San Fernando, I-5 intersects SR 118. Following this, I-5 intersects three routes in succession: the northern end of I-405, the western end of I-210, and the southern end of SR 14 at the Newhall Pass interchange. It then crosses the Newhall Pass through the Santa Susana Mountains into the Santa Clarita Valley. I-5's carpool lanes also have direct connectors with the carpool lanes on the SR 170 and SR 14 freeways (an additional direct connector with the HOV lanes on I-405 near Mission Hills is planned). This allows a continuous HOV lane to run from Palmdale to North Hollywood via SR 14 to I-5 to SR 170.

I-5 continues along the western city limits of Santa Clarita and passes Six Flags Magic Mountain, intersecting SR 126 just north of there.

=== Tejon Pass and Grapevine ===
The Golden State Freeway then rises sharply, passing by Lake Castaic and undergoing a unique crossover resulting in a left-driving configuration for about 5 mi (8.0 km) before the highway crosses back into its standard alignment. This section is known as the Five Mile Grade. After cresting the Five Mile Grade, the freeway enters the Angeles National Forest. It passes Pyramid Lake and intersects SR 138 before crossing the Tejon Pass through the Tehachapi Mountains near the Los Angeles–Kern county line, with Path 26 power lines generally paralleling the freeway.

After entering Kern County, the freeway sharply descends for 12 mi (19 km) from 4,144 ft (1,263 m) at the Tejon Pass to 1,499 ft (457 m) at Grapevine near the southernmost point of the San Joaquin Valley, approximately 30 mi (48 km) south of Bakersfield and 5 mi (8.0 km) south of its interchange with SR 99 at Wheeler Ridge.

This stretch of I-5 through the Tejon Pass and Grapevine typically gets snow at higher elevations during the winter. Although Caltrans may require vehicles to use snow tires, snow chains, or other traction devices during and after snowstorms, the California Highway Patrol will instead usually close this segment altogether during these conditions because of the steep grade of the pass, and the amount of passenger traffic and big-rigs that generally use the corridor. Whenever there is such a closure, traffic must either wait for it to reopen, or endure a multi-hour detour. An automated gate on the freeway's median in Castaic north of Lake Hughes Road allows drivers to turn around when such closures occur.

=== Central Valley ===
From SR 99 at Wheeler Ridge to Woodland, I-5 is known as the West Side Freeway. I-5 parallels SR 33, skirting along the far more remote western edge of the Central Valley, and is largely removed from the major population centers such as Bakersfield, Fresno and Modesto; other state highways provide connections. I-5 still runs within the vicinity of Avenal, Coalinga, Los Banos, and a handful of other smaller cities on the western edge of the Central Valley. For most of this section, the Path 15 electrical transmission corridor follows the highway, forming an infrastructure corridor along with the California Aqueduct. After the Grapevine, I-5 crosses the California Aqueduct. This is first time out of 5 times that I-5 crosses the aqueduct.

North of the Grapevine, I-5 intersects SR 166, SR 119 and SR 43 before meeting SR 58, a highway that continues east to Bakersfield, near the town of Buttonwillow. I-5 then intersects SR 46 before entering Kings County. From the Utica Avenue exit to I-580, I-5 parallels the eastern foothills of the Diablo Range. It crosses the California Aqueduct for the second time. In Kings County, I-5 intersects SR 41 before briefly entering the city limits of Avenal, where it intersects SR 269. In Fresno County, I-5 intersects SR 198 and SR 145 before running concurrently with SR 33 for several miles. I-5 then crosses into Merced County, intersecting SR 165, SR 152 and SR 33 near the San Luis Reservoir (where SR 152 provides a major connection to the Monterey Peninsula and the Silicon Valley), and SR 140 at the Stanislaus county line. I-5 crosses the California Aqueduct for the third time between SR 152 and SR 33 and again near Crows Landing.

In San Joaquin County, I-580 splits off from I-5 south of Tracy, providing a spur-route connection to the San Francisco Bay Area. From here, I-5 crosses the California Aqueduct for the final time and intersects SR 132, a major route to Modesto and the mountains in the east, as well as the northern end of SR 33. After passing Tracy, I-5 intersects I-205, a connector route to I-580, before intersecting the SR 120 freeway near Manteca. After passing through Lathrop, I-5 heads due north through Stockton, intersecting the SR 4 freeway that provides access to downtown Stockton. I-5 passes through the western portion of the Lodi city limits before intersecting SR 12 and entering Sacramento County.

I-5 enters the city of Elk Grove while passing along the eastern edge of the Stone Lakes National Wildlife Refuge. It then crosses into the Sacramento city limits, soon paralleling the Sacramento River before intersecting the Capital City Freeway, which carries US 50 and I-80 Business (I-80 Bus.). SR 99 merges with I-5 at this point, and the two routes pass through the western half of downtown Sacramento. Following the bridge over the American River, I-5 and SR 99 intersect the major transcontinental route of I-80. Just as I-5 leaves Sacramento, SR 99 splits off and continues north while I-5 turns due west past Sacramento International Airport and crosses the Sacramento River into Yolo County. In Woodland, the SR 113 freeway merges with I-5 before exiting to the north. The Interstate heads northwest again toward Dunnigan, where it converges with I-505.

I-5 skirts north along the western edge of the Sacramento Valley, bypassing the larger cities of the region, including Yuba City, Oroville and Chico, before reaching Red Bluff. From Dunnigan, I-5 enters Colusa County, passing through the city of Williams and intersecting SR 20. In Glenn County, I-5 intersects SR 162 in Willows and SR 32 in Orland. I-5 then crosses into Tehama County, passing through Corning before entering Red Bluff and intersecting SR 36, which connects to the northern end of SR 99. I-5 crosses the Sacramento River twice before entering Shasta County.

=== Cascade Region ===
I-5 then enters the Shasta Cascade region, intersecting SR 273 in Anderson before passing through Redding and intersecting SR 44 and SR 299. The freeway then continues through the city of Shasta Lake, intersecting SR 151, before crossing over Shasta Lake on the Pit River Bridge and climbing up to near the foot of Mount Shasta. Just north of the bridge over Shasta Lake, I-5 also boasts the second-largest median in California after I-8's In‑Ko‑Pah grade. In Siskiyou County, I-5 passes through Dunsmuir before intersecting SR 89 near Lake Siskiyou and entering the city of Mount Shasta. North of here, US 97 intersects I-5 in Weed, providing access to Klamath Falls, Oregon. The Interstate then continues to Yreka, intersecting SR 3 and SR 96 before crossing the Klamath River and reaching the Oregon border and the Siskiyou Summit. From Red Bluff to the Oregon state line, I-5 is known as the "Cascade Wonderland Highway".

North of Redding, I-5 regularly gets snow at higher elevations from fall to spring. Caltrans sometimes requires vehicles to use snow tires, snow chains, or other traction devices in the mountains during and after snowstorms. Checkpoints are often set up to enforce chain restrictions on vehicles bound for icy or snowy areas. When chain restrictions are in effect, vehicles must have chains on the driving wheels, except 4WD vehicles with snow tires. Additionally, during the winter season, trucks are required to carry chains whether or not controls are in force.

== History ==
=== Historical naming ===
The portion of this highway from Los Angeles to San Diego was also co-signed as US 101 until 1964–1968. The portion of this highway from Woodland to Red Bluff roughly follows old US 99W.

In California, the former western branch of Interstate 5 (the northern end of the spur into the Bay Area) connecting I-80 out of Vacaville to near Dunnigan, previously known as I-5W, was renamed I-505. Interstate 580 running between I-5 and I-80 was also once designated 5W; what is now I-5 (the stretch that runs through Sacramento) had been originally designated I-5E.

The term "Golden State Highway" was the popular name for US 99 through the length of California; the name was chosen in a public contest in 1927, but was never officially adopted. Since the construction of I-5, it has taken over the term "Golden State Freeway" from 99 south of the latter's southern terminus in Kern County.

=== Los Angeles area ===
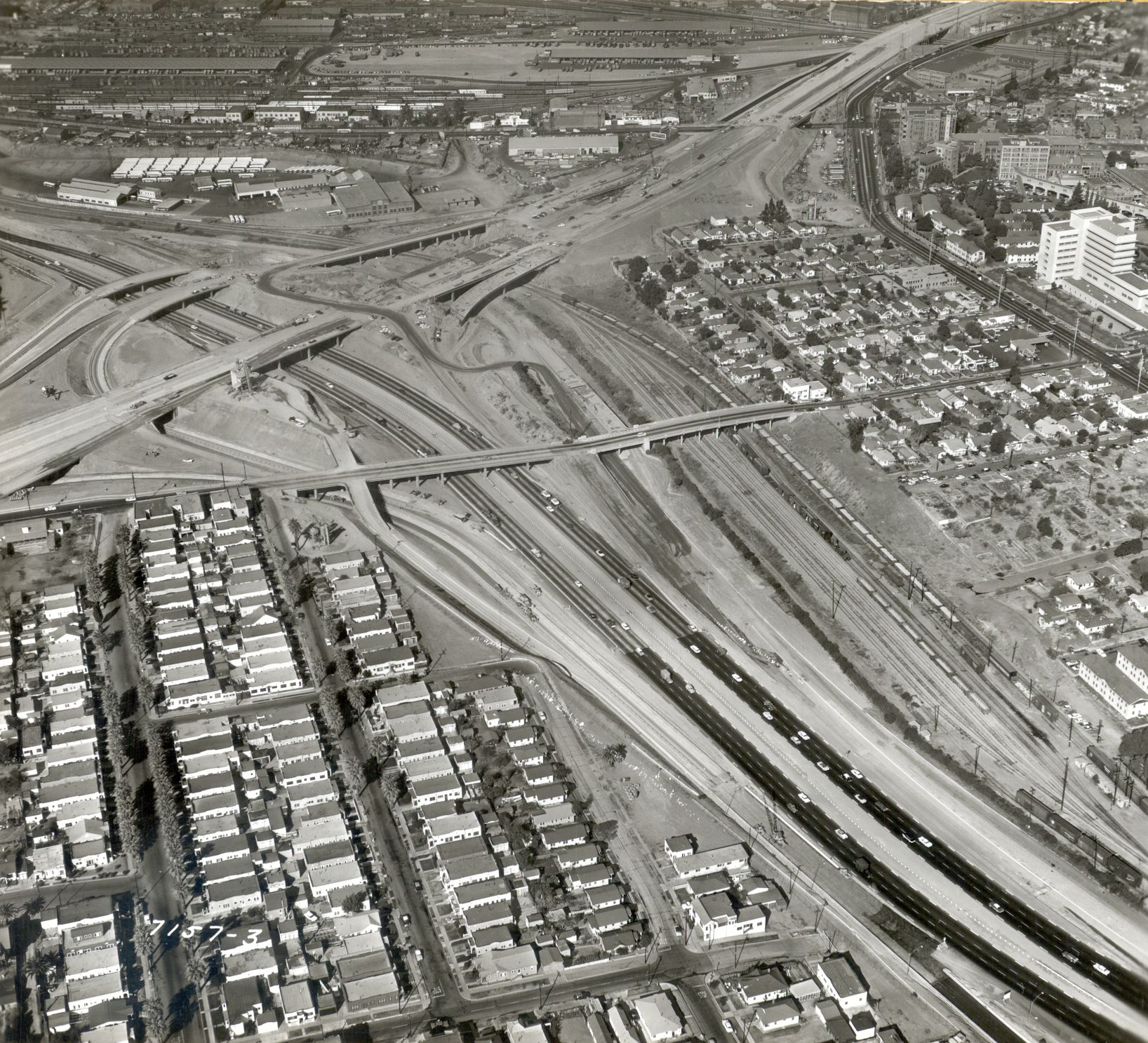
Construction of the interchange with San Bernardino Freeway (now I-10), 1959

The Golden State Freeway was proposed by the California Highway Commission in 1953. The proposal drew strong criticism from East Los Angeles residents as it would dissect and eliminate large residential and commercial areas of Boyle Heights and Hollenbeck Heights. The proposal also seemed to indicate a disregard for the ethnic Mexican American population of metropolitan Los Angeles. The "Boyle–Hollenbeck Anti–Golden State Freeway Committee" was formed for the purpose of blocking or rerouting the freeway. Then–Los Angeles City Council member Edward R. Roybal chaired that committee. Despite this opposition, the construction of the freeway went ahead.

When this section was completed in 1956, the newspaper The Eastside Sun wrote the freeway led to the "eradication, obliteration, razing, moving, ripping asunder, demolishing of Eastside homes." A widowed Edendale resident, Lomie Puckett, resisted the condemnation of one of her rental properties in August 1958 by using a rifle to threaten state workers and police. After a five-day standoff with police, the home was seized and later demolished.

The section between Orange County and Los Angeles was originally designed to have three lanes in each direction. Due to high traffic demand, the freeway underwent major extensions and widening in Orange County during the 1990s. Work from SR 91 north through the Los Angeles–Orange County line was then completed in 2010, and reconstruction between the county line and Interstate 605 was completed in 2023.

=== Newhall Pass ===
The original route went through the towns of Saugus and Newhall, and then crossed Newhall Pass (current route of SR 14, the Antelope Valley Freeway). In 1862, Beale's Cut was made in the construction of a toll wagon road. The 15 ft-wide (4.6 m) by 60 ft-deep (18 m) "slot" was dug with picks and shovels. That road would become part of the Midway Route. At the turn of the century, it was the most direct automobile route between Los Angeles and the San Joaquin Valley via the Mojave Desert and Tehachapi Pass.

In 1910, Beale's Cut was bypassed by the Newhall Tunnel. Constructed by Los Angeles County, it was too narrow for two trucks to pass each other inside. As a result, in 1939, the tunnel was completely removed (or "daylighted") when the road was widened to four lanes. Additionally, by 1930, a bypass road was constructed to avoid Newhall Pass via Weldon and Gavin canyons, which is the current route of I-5.

Both routes were eventually built as freeways. The Gavin Canyon route became I-5, and the main north–south route via the Ridge Route. The Newhall Pass route became SR 14, which is the main route between Los Angeles and the growing high desert communities of the Antelope Valley. It is also still a part of the important Midway Route, which is the primary alternate route when I-5 is closed (via SR 58 and SR 14).

The interchange has partially collapsed twice due to earthquakes: the 1971 Sylmar earthquake and the 1994 Northridge earthquake. As a result of the 1994 collapse, this interchange was renamed the "Clarence Wayne Dean Memorial Interchange", honoring a Los Angeles Police Department motorcycle officer killed when he was unable to stop in time and drove off the collapsed flyover ramp from SR 14 south to I-5 south. After both earthquakes, the collapsed portions were rebuilt and surviving portions reinforced.

In the evening of October 12, 2007, two trucks collided in the southbound tunnel that takes the truck bypass roadway under the main lanes near the Newhall Pass interchange. Fifteen trucks caught fire, killing three people and injuring ten.

=== Ridge Route ===
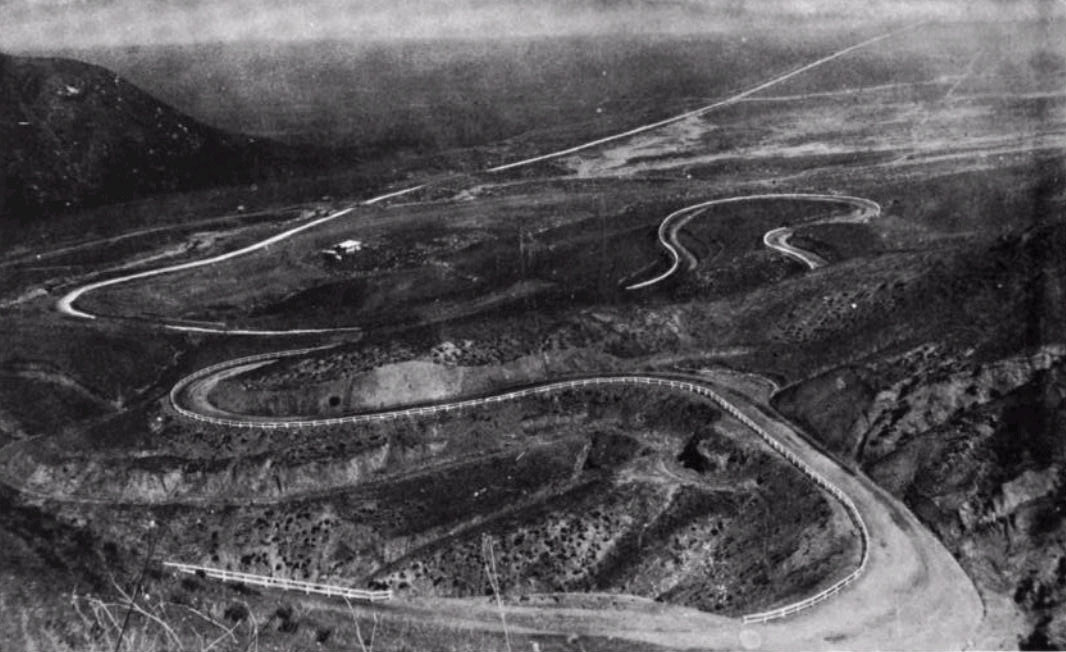
View of the Grapevine loops looking north toward the San Joaquin Valley c. 1920, before the Ridge Route Alternate was built off to the left

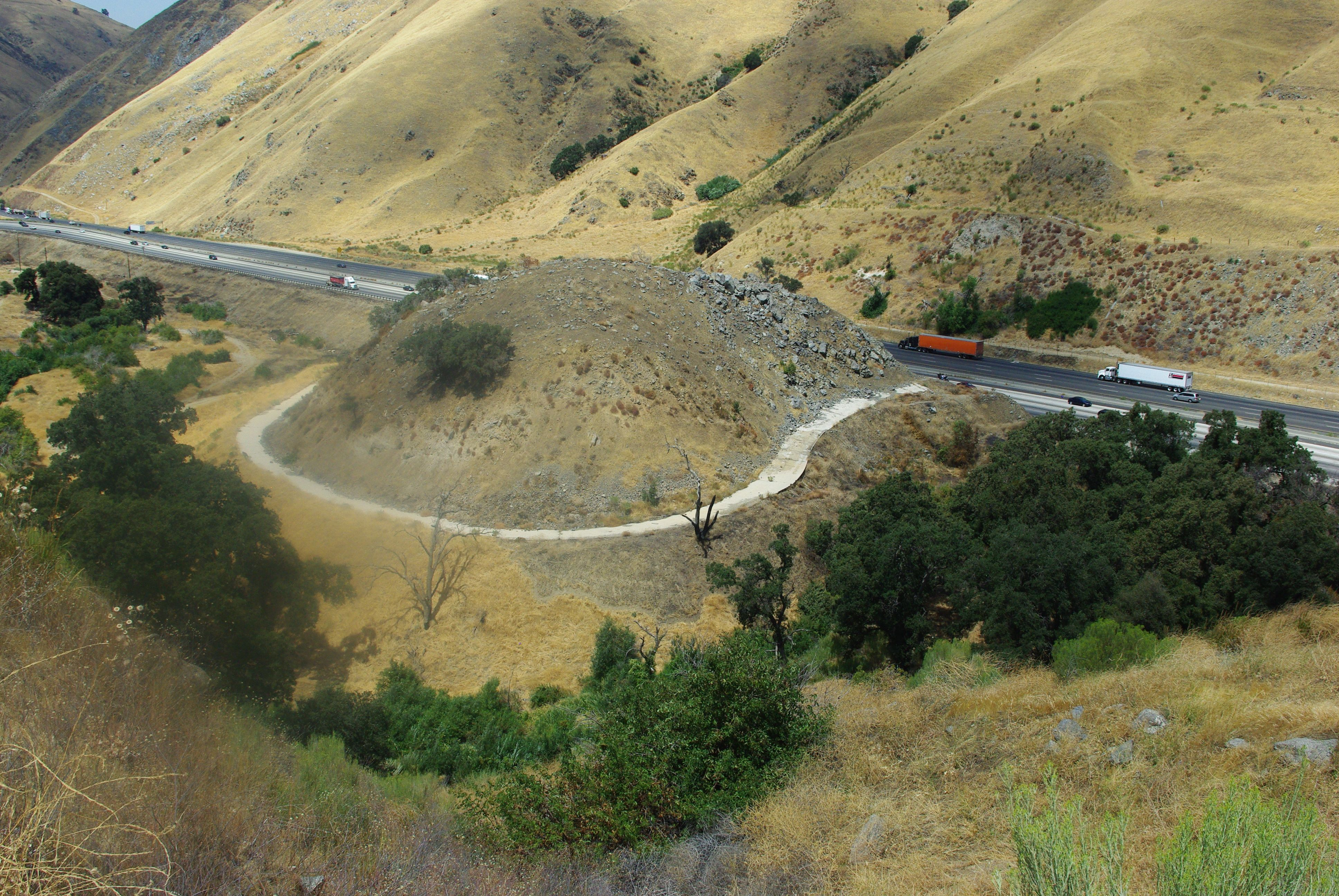
A section of the 1915 Ridge Route in Lebec, abandoned when US 99 (later upgraded to I-5) was constructed over the Tejon Pass in order to make the travel straighter and safer

The Ridge Route refers to the section of highway between Castaic and Grapevine, through the Tejon Pass. The highway had its origins in the early 1910s, when a route was needed to connect Los Angeles to the Central Valley. Some believed that the only option was the route through the Mojave Desert and the Tehachapi Mountains, but a new route was discovered through the Tejon Pass. This route became known as the Ridge Route and saw almost constant planning, construction, and improvement from 1914 to 1970.

The first road was completed in 1915. It was a slow, winding, two-lane road through the mountains with a speed limit of 15 mph (24 km/h) in some places. However, the need for improvements was realized soon after it was completed. The road was paved after World War I, and several blind turns were opened up ("daylighted"). Even with these improvements in the 1920s, it became clear that a new route was needed to keep up with increasing demand.

In 1927, plans were drawn up for a "Ridge Route Alternate", named as it was planned as an addition to the existing Ridge Route and not as a replacement. It opened in 1933 as a three-lane highway through the mountains. The middle or "suicide lane" was used as an overtaking lane for cars in both directions. This route was a great improvement, faster and 9.7 mi (15.6 km) shorter than the old Ridge Route, but was not enough to satisfy demand, and a conversion to a four-lane expressway was needed. The outbreak of World War II delayed this until 1948 and the fourth lane was completed in 1952. However, just three years later, plans were begun for converting the four-lane expressway to a six-lane freeway.

The last major alteration to the Ridge Route began in the early 1960s. By then, the plan for a six-lane freeway had expanded to eight lanes. This construction project made the most changes to the route. Many of the curves that followed the mountainside were cut through. To climb the mountain on the south side of Castaic more easily, traffic lanes were reversed (southbound lanes to the east and northbound lanes to the west). To prevent head-on collisions, the two ends of the route were separated on two different mountainsides, and the section through Piru Canyon was moved to an entirely new alignment to make room for Pyramid Lake. The project was completed by 1970 and brought the Ridge Route to its current alignment.

=== San Joaquin Valley ===
When the Interstate Highway System was created in 1956, there was discussion about which way to route the interstate through the San Joaquin Valley (Central Valley). Two proposals were considered. One was to convert the Golden State Highway (US 99, later SR 99) into a freeway. The other was to use the proposed West Side Freeway (current Interstate 5), which had been endorsed by local groups as early as 1945. The Golden State Highway route would serve many farming communities across the San Joaquin Valley, but the West Side Freeway proposal would bypass all the Central Valley communities and thus provide a faster and more direct north–south route through the state and so was eventually chosen.

Construction began in the early 1960s. There were just three phases for the 321 mi (517 km). The first phase, completed in 1967, ran from the San Joaquin County line to Los Banos. The second phase, completed in 1972, extended the freeway south to Wheeler Ridge and connected it to SR 99. The freeway then started to see traffic, as in Stockton there were only 4 mi (6.4 km) between the West Side Freeway and the Golden State Highway. The third phase, completed in 1979, extended the freeway to Sacramento and connected it to the northern I-5.

When the second phase of the freeway opened in 1972, it was a long and lonely route with no businesses alongside. Services were not easily available as the nearest towns were miles away and generally out of sight. It was common for cars to run out of fuel. Over time the West Side Freeway (I-5) saw the development of businesses serving the needs of travelers. For years, there has still been interest in designating the Golden State Highway route as its own interstate, I-7 or I-9.

The median on I-5 between Wheeler Ridge and Tracy is wide enough to accommodate widening the West Side Freeway to six or eight lanes, should the need arise.

=== I-5W and the San Francisco Bay Area ===
Interstate 5W
- Location: Tracy–Dunnigan
- Existed: 1957–1977

I-5's more direct Los Angeles-to-Sacramento route bypasses San Francisco, San Jose, Oakland, and the rest of the San Francisco Bay Area. Original plans also called for a loop Interstate with a directional suffix, I-5W. This route now roughly corresponds to I-580 from I-5 south of Tracy to Oakland, I-80 from Oakland to Vacaville, and I-505 from Vacaville to I-5 near Dunnigan. I-5W and most of the other Interstates around the country with directional suffixes were eventually renumbered or eliminated, except I-35E and I-35W in Texas and Minnesota. Nevertheless, San Francisco is still listed as a control city on northbound I-5 between SR 99 and I-580.

=== Sacramento area ===
Interstate 5 in downtown Sacramento closely follows the Sacramento River. This has resulted in complex engineering work to keep the section dry due to it being located below the water table. Locally, Caltrans refers to this part of the freeway as the "Boat Section". Due to record levels of rainfall in 1980 the Boat Section was flooded with 15 ft (4.6 m) of water. Caltrans began constructing this section during the 1960s and 1970s. The freeway was engineered below grade so it would be out of the view of offices and shops in downtown Sacramento. To achieve this, the site was excavated and the seeping water was pumped from the area. An intricate drainage system, water pump and retaining wall are used to protect the freeway from the Sacramento River. However, the system slowly clogged up over the years with sand and silt buildup. Major repair work of the Boat Section began on May 30, 2008. The construction was to take 40 days to complete, requiring complete northbound and southbound closures on an alternating schedule.

=== Redding to Oregon ===
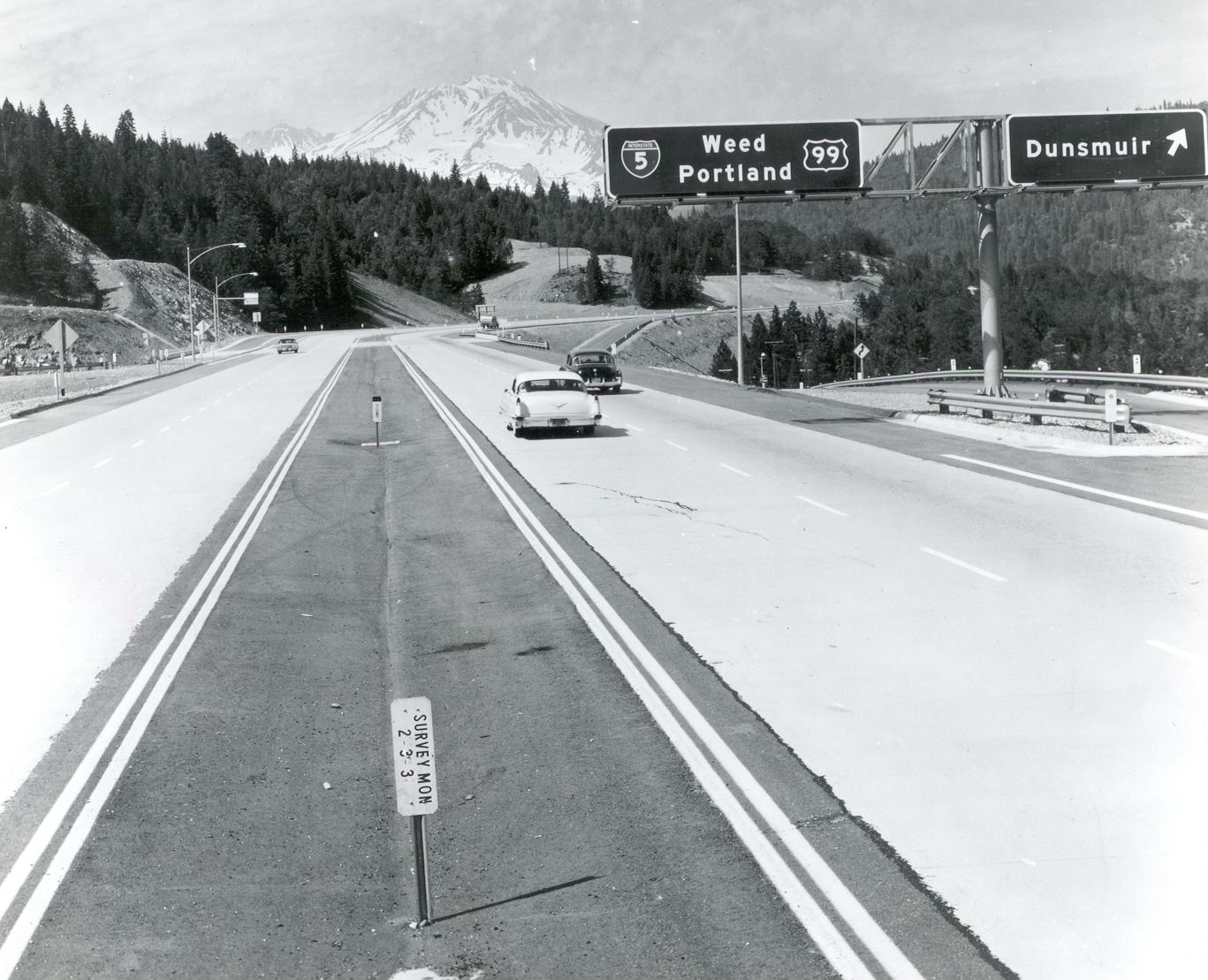
Exit 729 at Dunsmuir with Mount Shasta in the background, 1963

In 1992, Caltrans finished upgrading the final 13 mile segment north of Lakehead.

=== HOV lane expansion in Southern California ===
I-5 through north San Diego County is currently undergoing expansion as part of the North Coast Corridor project. The carpool lane expansion from Lomas Santa Fe Drive to SR 78 fully opened by late 2023. As part of this expansion, the bridge carrying I-5 over San Elijo Lagoon was replaced with a much wider bridge. Previously in 2007, a carpool lane opened between Lomas Santa Fe Drive and I-805, with a continuation of the lanes on I-805 to Governor Drive opening in 2016. There are plans to construct the last three miles from SR 78 to Oceanside Harbor Drive, however, there is a lack of funding for them, and there are no plans to set aside funding from the state to construct them.

In Orange County, the HOV lane opened in the mid-1990s between SR 1 and SR 91, following the widening of the freeway between SR 55 and SR 91, between SR 91 and Artesia Boulevard in 2010, and between SR 1 and Avenida Pico in 2018. Multiple carpool flyovers were constructed during this time to connect motorists from one freeway's carpool lanes to the next (see Exit List for a list of them). In 2011, ground broke on a major expansion of the freeway through La Mirada and Norwalk in neighboring Los Angeles County to the I-605 interchange, which included a carpool lane to Florence Avenue. The carpool lane fully opened in 2022. Currently, in San Clemente, there are studies to extend the carpool lanes from their current terminus at Avenida Pico to Cristianitos Road at the county line. At an OCTA board meeting in August 2024, it was discussed that preliminary engineering is ongoing and will be complete next year. However, a timeline for actual construction was not provided. This extension would give way for I-5 to have carpool lanes for its entire length in Orange County, plus the newly widened section in Los Angeles County, for a total of 50 miles. OCTA and Caltrans are expected to work with the residents of San Clemente during the process, as several bridges may have to be replaced with wider ones, and buildings may have to be demolished for the widening.

North of downtown Los Angeles, the freeway is currently undergoing widening, which includes the addition of HOV lanes in four phases. The first phase was the opening of a carpool lane between carpool lane between SR 170 and SR 14 in 2011. A flyover between the carpool lanes of SR 14 and I-5 opened in 2014. The second phase was between Buena Vista Street and SR 170, and the carpool lane opened in 2014. This phase also included a flyover between the existing carpool lane of SR 170 and the newly constructed I-5. The freeway in this phase went through no improvements, and used existing median shoulders to construct the HOV lane, thus all the original overpasses were retained, and some undercrossings also have no right hand shoulder as a result. A third phase saw the widening between SR 134 and Buena Vista Street, and the carpool lane opened in 2022. This phase gave room for the replacement of the Burbank Boulevard bridge, and the opening of a new interchange at Empire Avenue, which replaced the Scott Road and Lincoln Street interchanges. The Empire Avenue interchange opened in 2019 and the Burbank Boulevard bridge replacement was completed in 2021. The fourth and final phase is in the Santa Clarita Valley, where Caltrans is undergoing construction to extend the carpool lane from the Newhall Pass interchange to Parker Road in Castaic. These lanes are scheduled to open to traffic in 2026. A fifth phase to build a flyover which will connect I-405's carpool lanes with I-5's is in the works, but there are no near plans to construct it. The same plan includes a southerly extension of the HOV lanes to the San Bernardino Split interchange, but there are no near plans to construct that as well. Widening that segment of the freeway will require several overpass demolitions, as well a major widening through the area, as the freeway is too small to handle the widening. The widening would also result in hundreds of homes and commercial buildings to be demolished.

== Future ==
Caltrans is studying a project in Orange County that would add managed express lanes on a 15.5-mile segment between Red Hill Avenue and the county line. Construction is projected to start in 2028.

OCTA, in cooperation with Caltrans, and the cities of Irvine and Tustin, have designed a widening project to the segment of I-5 in between I-405 to SR-55. The project widens the segment by adding one general purpose lane and auxiliary lanes in each direction, and modifies ramp configurations at interchanges. The project started construction in February 2026 and is projected to be completed in 2029.

In Sacramento, Caltrans is working on the Sac-5 Managed Lanes project, which would construct managed lanes on I-5 between US-50 to the Sacramento River. The exact design has not been finalized, with 9 different proposals being considered, ranging from HOT lanes, HOV lanes, transit lanes, free express lanes. Construction would start in 2029 and wrap up in 2032.

In Stockton, Caltrans is replacing the existing channel viaduct from SR 4 to Carlton Avenue, construction is expected to start in 2027 with completion projected in 2033.

== Exit list ==
County	Location	mi	km	Exit	Destinations	Notes
San Diego	San Diego	0.00	0.00		Fed. 1 / Fed. 1D south – Tijuana	Southern terminus of I-5; South end of the John J. Montgomery Freeway; roadway continues beyond the Mexican border at San Ysidro Port of Entry as Federal Highway 1
San Diego	San Diego	0.22	0.35	1A	Camino de la Plaza	Last USA exit southbound; northbound exit via the border inspection station's SENTRI and Ready lanes
San Diego	San Diego	0.22	0.35	1A	I-805 north	Northbound exit and southbound entrance; southern terminus of I-805
San Diego	San Diego	1.11	1.79	1B	Via de San Ysidro	No southbound entrance
San Diego	San Diego	2.22	3.57	2	San Ysidro Boulevard, Dairy Mart Road	
San Diego	San Diego	3.03	4.88	3	SR 905 east / Tocayo Avenue	Western terminus of SR 905; future I-905; SR 905 exits 1A-B; former SR 117
San Diego	San Diego	3.95	6.36	4	Coronado Avenue	
San Diego	San Diego	4.54	7.31	5A	SR 75 north (Palm Avenue) – Imperial Beach	Southern terminus of SR 75
San Diego	Chula Vista	5.31	8.55	5B	Main Street	
San Diego	Chula Vista	5.97	9.61	6	Palomar Street	
San Diego	Chula Vista	6.72	10.81	7A	L Street	Northbound exit and entrance connect to Industrial Boulevard; southbound exit and entrance connect to Bay Boulevard
San Diego	Chula Vista	7.21	11.60	7B	J Street, Marina Parkway	
San Diego	Chula Vista	7.72	12.42	8A	H Street	
San Diego	Chula Vista	8.47	13.63	8B	E Street (CR S17)	
San Diego	National City	9.31	14.98	9	SR 54 east	Western terminus of SR 54; SR 54 exits 1A-B
San Diego	National City	9.95	16.01	10	Mile of Cars Way (24th Street), Bay Marina Drive	
San Diego	National City	10.66	17.16	11A	Harbor Drive, Civic Center Drive	
San Diego	National City	11.04	17.77	11B	Plaza Boulevard, 8th Street – Downtown National City	
San Diego	San Diego	11.57	18.62	12	Division Street, Main Street, National City Boulevard	
San Diego	San Diego	12.56	20.21	13A	SR 15 north (Escondido Freeway) – Riverside	Southern terminus of SR 15; future I-15; SR 15 exits 1B-C; former SR 103
San Diego	San Diego	13.30	21.40	13B	28th Street, National Avenue	
San Diego	San Diego	13.99	22.51	14A	SR 75 south (San Diego-Coronado Bridge) – Coronado	Northern terminus of SR 75
San Diego	San Diego	14.03	22.58	14B	Chicano Park Boulevard	Formerly Crosby Street and Cesar E. Chavez Parkway
San Diego	San Diego	14.65	23.58	15A	J Street to SR 94 east (M. L. King Jr. Freeway)	Northbound signage
San Diego	San Diego	14.65	23.58	15A	Imperial Avenue	Southbound signage
San Diego	San Diego	14.95	24.06	15B	SR 94 east (M. L. King Jr. Freeway)	Northern end of the John J. Montgomery Freeway and southern end of San Diego Freeway; northbound access via exit 15A; western terminus of SR 94; SR 94 exit 1A
San Diego	San Diego	15.32	24.66	15C	B Street, Pershing Drive	Signed as exit 15B northbound
San Diego	San Diego	15.98	25.72	16A	SR 163 north / Tenth Avenue – Escondido	Signed as exit 16 southbound; southern terminus of SR 163; SR 163 exit 1B; former US 395
San Diego	San Diego	16.22	26.10	16B	6th Avenue – Downtown San Diego	Northbound exit and southbound entrance
San Diego	San Diego	16.82	27.07	17	Front Street, 2nd Avenue – Civic Center	No northbound exit
San Diego	San Diego	16.82	27.07	17A	Hawthorn Street – San Diego Airport	No southbound exit
San Diego	San Diego	16.50– 17.68	26.55– 28.45	17B	Sassafras Street – Rental Car Center, San Diego Airport	Signed as exit 18A southbound
San Diego	San Diego	17.68	28.45	18A	Pacific Highway	Northbound exit and southbound entrance; former US 101
San Diego	San Diego	18.19	29.27	18B	Washington Street	Former US 80 east
San Diego	San Diego	18.94	30.48	19	Old Town Avenue	Serves Old Town San Diego State Historic Park
San Diego	San Diego	19.97	32.14	20	I-8 east – El Centro	Northbound exit provides direct access to Morena Boulevard; I-8 west exits 2A-B
San Diego	San Diego	19.97	32.14	20	I-8 west – Beaches	Northbound exit and southbound entrance; I-8 east exit 2
San Diego	San Diego	19.97	32.14	20	Rosecrans Street	Southbound exit and northbound entrance; former SR 209 south
San Diego	San Diego	20.73	33.36	21	Sea World Drive, Tecolote Road	Serves SeaWorld San Diego
San Diego	San Diego	22.17	35.68	22	Clairemont Drive, East Mission Bay Drive	
San Diego	San Diego	22.78	36.66	23A	Grand Avenue, Garnet Avenue	Northbound exit and southbound entrance; connects to Mission Bay Drive; Mission Bay Drive follows the original routing of former US 101/BL I-5
San Diego	San Diego	23.39	37.64	23B	Balboa Avenue east	Southbound exit is via exit 23; former SR 274
San Diego	San Diego	23.39	37.64	23	Balboa Avenue, Garnet Avenue	Southbound exit and northbound entrance; connects to Mission Bay Drive; Mission Bay Drive follows the original routing of former US 101/BL I-5
San Diego	San Diego	25.86	41.62	26A	La Jolla Parkway west	Northbound exit and southbound entrance; formerly Ardath Road
San Diego	San Diego	25.86	41.62	26B	SR 52 east	Signed as exit 26 southbound; western terminus of SR 52; SR 52 west exit 1A
San Diego	San Diego	26.70	42.97	27	Gilman Drive, La Jolla Colony Drive	
San Diego	San Diego	28.07	45.17	28A	Nobel Drive	Northbound exit and southbound entrance
San Diego	San Diego	28.34	45.61	28B	La Jolla Village Drive	Signed as exit 28 southbound
San Diego	San Diego	29.37	47.27	29	Genesee Avenue (CR S21)	
San Diego	San Diego	30.34	48.83	30	Sorrento Valley Road	Northbound exit and southbound entrance
San Diego	San Diego	30.60	49.25	—	I-5 Local Bypass to SR 56 east	South end of Local Bypass lanes
San Diego	San Diego	30.60	49.25	31	I-805 south (Jacob Dekema Freeway) – Chula Vista	Southbound exit and northbound entrance; I-805 exit 33A to Local Bypass lanes; northern terminus of I-805
San Diego	San Diego	31.72	51.05	32	Carmel Mountain Road	Local Bypass lanes access only
San Diego	San Diego	32.81	52.80	33A	SR 56 east (Ted Williams Freeway)	Local Bypass lanes access only; northbound exit and southbound entrance; southbound access via exit 33; western terminus of SR 56
San Diego	San Diego	32.81	52.80	—	I-5 Local Bypass to Carmel Mountain Road	North end of Local Bypass lanes
San Diego	San Diego	32.81	52.80	33B	Carmel Valley Road to SR 56 east	Signed as exit 33 southbound
San Diego	San Diego	34.04	54.78	34	Del Mar Heights Road	
San Diego	San Diego–Solana Beach line	36.18	58.23	36	Via de la Valle (CR S6)	
San Diego	Solana Beach	37.29	60.01	37	Lomas Santa Fe Drive (CR S8)	
San Diego	Encinitas	38.53	62.01	39	Manchester Avenue	
San Diego	Encinitas	39.74	63.96	40	Birmingham Drive	
San Diego	Encinitas	40.51	65.19	41A	Santa Fe Drive	
San Diego	Encinitas	41.42	66.66	41B	Encinitas Boulevard (CR S9)	
San Diego	Encinitas	42.62	68.59	43	Leucadia Boulevard	
San Diego	Encinitas–Carlsbad line	43.98	70.78	44	La Costa Avenue	
San Diego	Carlsbad	45.48	73.19	45	Poinsettia Lane, Aviara Parkway	Aviara Parkway is 1/2 mile east of I-5
San Diego	Carlsbad	46.94	75.54	47	Palomar Airport Road (CR S12)	
San Diego	Carlsbad	47.89	77.07	48	Cannon Road	Serves Legoland California
San Diego	Carlsbad	49.19	79.16	49	Tamarack Avenue	
San Diego	Carlsbad	50.02	80.50	50	Carlsbad Village Drive – Downtown Carlsbad	Formerly Elm Avenue
San Diego	Carlsbad	50.59	81.42	51A	Las Flores Drive	
San Diego	Oceanside	51.11	82.25	51B	SR 78 east (Ronald Packard Freeway) / Vista Way – Escondido, Oceanside	Signed as exits 51B (SR 78) and 51C (Vista Way) northbound; western terminus of SR 78; SR 78 exits 1A-B
San Diego	Oceanside	51.38	82.69	51C	Cassidy Street	No northbound exit
San Diego	Oceanside	52.21	84.02	52	Oceanside Boulevard	
San Diego	Oceanside	53.12	85.49	53	Mission Avenue (SR 76 Bus.) – Downtown Oceanside	Serves Mission San Luis Rey
San Diego	Oceanside	53.67– 53.84	86.37– 86.65	54A	SR 76 east / Coast Highway (CR S21)	Signed as exits 54A (SR 76) and 54B (Coast Highway) southbound; western terminus of SR 76; Coast Highway was formerly Hill Street and US 101
San Diego	Oceanside–Camp Pendleton South line	53.84– 54.30	86.65– 87.39	54C	Harbor Drive, Vandegrift Boulevard – Camp Pendleton	Signed as exits 54B (Vandegrift Boulevard/Camp Pendleton) and 54C (Harbor Drive) northbound
San Diego		59.35– 59.87	95.51– 96.35	Aliso Creek Rest Area		
San Diego		61.99	99.76	62	Las Pulgas Road	
San Diego		67.26	108.24	US Border Patrol checkpoint (northbound only)		
San Diego		67.26	108.24	Weigh station		
San Diego		71.30	114.75	71	Basilone Road – San Onofre	
San Diego–Orange county line	San Clemente	72.19	116.18	72	Cristianitos Road	Former I-5 Bus. north
Orange	San Clemente	73.28	117.93	73	Avenida Magdalena	Northbound signage
Orange	San Clemente	73.28	117.93	73	Avenida Calafia	Southbound signage
Orange	San Clemente	73.91	118.95	74	El Camino Real	Former US 101; former I-5 Bus.
Orange	San Clemente	74.94	120.60	75	Avenida Presidio	No southbound exit
Orange	San Clemente	74.94	120.60	75	Avenida Palizada	Southbound exit and northbound entrance; former I-5 Bus. south
Orange	San Clemente	75.67	121.78	76	Avenida Pico	
Orange	San Clemente	76.56	123.21	77	Avenida Vista Hermosa	
Orange	San Clemente–Dana Point line	78.08	125.66	78	Camino de Estrella	
Orange	Dana Point–San Juan Capistrano line	79.06	127.23	79	SR 1 north (Pacific Coast Highway) / Camino Las Ramblas – Beach Cities	Southern terminus of SR 1; Pacific Coast Highway is former US 101 Alt. north
Orange	San Juan Capistrano			—	Stonehill Drive	Northbound entrance only
Orange	San Juan Capistrano	80.83	130.08	81	Camino Capistrano	
Orange	San Juan Capistrano	81.88	131.77	82	SR 74 east (Ortega Highway) – San Juan Capistrano	Western terminus of SR 74
Orange	San Juan Capistrano	83.19	133.88	83	Junipero Serra Road	
Orange	San Juan Capistrano–Mission Viejo– Laguna Niguel tripoint	84.83	136.52	85A	SR 73 Toll north (San Joaquin Hills Toll Road) – Long Beach	Northbound exit and southbound entrance; southern terminus of SR 73; toll free until SR 73 exit 2 (Greenfield Drive)
Orange	Mission Viejo	85.22	137.15	85B	Avery Parkway	Signed as exit 85 southbound
Orange	Mission Viejo	86.06	138.50	86	Crown Valley Parkway	
Orange	Mission Viejo	87.50	140.82	88	Oso Parkway	
Orange	Mission Viejo–Laguna Hills line	88.81	142.93	89	La Paz Road	
Orange	Mission Viejo–Laguna Hills line	89.75	144.44	90	Alicia Parkway	
Orange	Laguna Hills–Lake Forest line	90.97	146.40	91	El Toro Road (CR S18)	
Orange	Laguna Hills–Lake Forest line	91.78	147.71	92	Lake Forest Drive	Signed as exit 92A northbound
Orange	Irvine	92.45	148.78	92	I-5 Truck / Bake Parkway	Signed as exit 92B northbound; serves the truck bypass around the El Toro Y
Orange	Irvine			♢	I-405 north	HOV access only; northbound exit and southbound entrance
Orange	Irvine	93.58	150.60	94A	I-405 north (San Diego Freeway north) – Long Beach	Northern end of San Diego Freeway and southern end of Santa Ana Freeway; northbound exit and southbound entrance; El Toro Y; southern terminus of I-405; connects to SR 133 south; former SR 7
Orange	Irvine	94.49	152.07	94B	Alton Parkway	Signed as exit 94 southbound
Orange	Irvine	94.84	152.63	♢	Barranca Parkway	HOV access only; southbound exit and northbound entrance
Orange	Irvine	95.47	153.64	95	SR 133 south / Barranca Parkway – Laguna Beach	Southbound exit and northbound entrance; SR 133 north exit 10
Orange	Irvine	96.22	154.85	96A	Sand Canyon Avenue	Signed as exit 96 northbound
Orange	Irvine	96.15	154.74	96B	SR 133 Toll north (Eastern Toll Road) – Rancho Santa Margarita, Riverside	Signed as exit 95 northbound; SR 133 south exits 10A-B
Orange	Irvine	97.27	156.54	97	Jeffrey Road	
Orange	Irvine	98.86	159.10	99	Culver Drive	
Orange	Irvine–Tustin line	99.86	160.71	100	Jamboree Road to SR 261 Toll	
Orange	Tustin				Myford Road	Exit removed in the 1990s during the expansion of I-5
Orange	Tustin	100.50	161.74	101A	Tustin Ranch Road	
Orange	Tustin	101.37	163.14	101B	Red Hill Avenue	
Orange	Tustin	101.90	163.99	102	Newport Avenue	Southbound exit and northbound entrance
Orange	Tustin	102.54	165.02	103A	SR 55 north (Costa Mesa Freeway) – Anaheim, Riverside	Northbound exit and southbound entrance; SR 55 south exit 11A
Orange	Tustin	102.54	165.02	103B	SR 55 south (Costa Mesa Freeway) – Newport Beach	Signed as exit 103 southbound; SR 55 north exits 10B-11A
Orange	Santa Ana	103.18– 103.54	166.05– 166.63	103C	First Street, Fourth Street	Signed as exit 104A southbound
Orange	Santa Ana			♢	SR 55 south	HOV access only; southbound exit and northbound entrance
Orange	Santa Ana			♢	Grand Avenue, Santa Ana Boulevard	HOV access only; northbound exit and southbound entrance
Orange	Santa Ana	104.04	167.44	104	Grand Avenue, Santa Ana Boulevard	Signed as exit 104B southbound
Orange	Santa Ana	104.74	168.56	105A	17th Street	
Orange	Santa Ana			♢	Main Street	HOV access only; southbound exit and northbound entrance; removed with freeway upgrades
Orange	Santa Ana	105.37	169.58	105B	Main Street, Broadway	Main Street south of I-5 was SR 73 south; north of I-5, it was former SR 51 north
Orange	Santa Ana–Orange line				Flower Street	Exit removed in 1991 for expansion of I-5; was southbound exit only
Orange	Santa Ana–Orange line	106.52	171.43	107A	La Veta Avenue, Bristol Street	Northbound exit is part of exit 106; serves Angel Stadium
Orange	Santa Ana–Orange line	106.52	171.43	107A	SR 22 east (Garden Grove Freeway) – Orange	Southbound exit and northbound entrance; south end of Orange Crush interchange; SR 22 west exit 14B
Orange	Santa Ana–Orange line	106.52	171.43	107A	SR 57 north (Orange Freeway) – Pomona	Northbound exit and southbound entrance; north end of Orange Crush interchange; southern terminus of SR 57; SR 57 south exit 1A
Orange	Santa Ana–Orange line	106.52	171.43	107B	SR 22 west (Garden Grove Freeway) – Long Beach	Signed as exit 106 northbound; SR 22 east exits 14C-D
Orange	Santa Ana–Orange line			♢	SR 57 north	HOV access only; northbound exit and southbound entrance
Orange	Orange	106.52	171.43	107B	Chapman Avenue	No southbound exit
Orange	Orange	107.48	172.97	107C	State College Boulevard, The City Drive, Chapman Avenue	Chapman Avenue not signed northbound; State College Boulevard was former SR 250 north
Orange	Anaheim	107.96	173.74	♢	Gene Autry Way, Disney Way	HOV access only; Disney Way not signed southbound
Orange	Anaheim	108.65	174.86	109A	Katella Avenue, Disney Way, Orangewood Avenue	Signed as exit 109 northbound; Disney Way not signed southbound, Orangewood Avenue (former SR 51 south) not signed northbound
Orange	Anaheim	108.89	175.24	109B	Disney Way, Anaheim Boulevard	No northbound exit; Anaheim Boulevard was former SR 72
Orange	Anaheim	109.68	176.51	110A	Harbor Boulevard, Ball Road	Signed as exit 110 northbound; Ball Road not signed southbound
Orange	Anaheim	109.95	176.95	110B	Disneyland Drive, Ball Road	No northbound exit
Orange	Anaheim			♢	Disneyland Drive	HOV access only; southbound exit only
Orange	Anaheim				South Street, West Street	Exit removed in the 1990s during the expansion of I-5; was northbound exit and entrance
Orange	Anaheim	111.23	179.01	111	Lincoln Avenue	Former SR 214
Orange	Anaheim				Loara Street	Exit removed in the 1990s during the expansion of I-5; was northbound exit and entrance
Orange	Anaheim	111.77	179.88	112	Euclid Street	
Orange	Anaheim				Crescent Avenue	Exit removed in December 1997 for expansion of I-5; was northbound exit and entrance
Orange	Anaheim	112.79	181.52	113	Brookhurst Street, La Palma Avenue	Signed as exits 113A (Brookhurst Street, La Palma Avenue west) and 113B (La Palma Avenue east) northbound
Orange	Anaheim–Fullerton line	113.78	183.11	113C	SR 91 west (Artesia Freeway)	Northbound exit and southbound entrance; SR 91 east exit 24
Orange	Anaheim–Fullerton line			♢	SR 91 west	HOV access only; northbound exit and southbound entrance
Orange	Fullerton	114.23	183.84	114A	Magnolia Avenue to SR 91 east	No northbound entrance; "To SR 91" not signed southbound; signed as exit 114 northbound
Orange	Fullerton–Buena Park line	114.38	184.08	114B	SR 91 east (Riverside Freeway) – Riverside	Southbound exit and northbound entrance; SR 91 west exit 24
Orange	Fullerton–Buena Park line			♢	SR 91 east	HOV access only; southbound exit and northbound entrance
Orange	Buena Park			—	Orangethorpe Avenue	Northbound entrance only
Orange	Buena Park	115.41	185.73	115	Auto Center Drive	Formerly Manchester Boulevard; northbound exit only; southbound entrance removed; former US 101 / SR 14
Orange	Buena Park	115.71	186.22	116	SR 39 (Beach Boulevard)	
Orange–Los Angeles county line	Buena Park–La Mirada line	116.54	187.55	117	Artesia Boulevard, Knott Avenue	Artesia Boulevard was former SR 91; Knott Avenue not signed northbound
Los Angeles	La Mirada–Santa Fe Springs line	117.87	189.69	118	Valley View Avenue	
Los Angeles	Santa Fe Springs				Alondra Boulevard	Closed April 18, 2017; were northbound and southbound entrances only (the latter via Firestone Boulevard)
Los Angeles	Santa Fe Springs–Norwalk line	119.07	191.62	119	Carmenita Road	
Los Angeles	Santa Fe Springs–Norwalk line	120.10	193.28	120	Rosecrans Avenue	Formerly exit 120A northbound
Los Angeles	Norwalk	120.30	193.60	120B	Firestone Boulevard	Closed; was northbound exit and southbound entrance; former SR 42
Los Angeles	Norwalk	120.88	194.54	121	Norwalk Boulevard, Imperial Highway	Signed as exit 122 southbound; former SR 35 (Norwalk Boulevard); former SR 90 (Imperial Highway)
Los Angeles	Norwalk	121.57	195.65	122	Imperial Highway, Pioneer Boulevard	Combined with exit 121 with freeway upgrades
Los Angeles	Santa Fe Springs–Downey line	123.04	198.01	123	Florence Avenue	Southbound exit is part of exit 124 via I-605 south ramp
Los Angeles	Santa Fe Springs–Downey line	123.51	198.77	124	I-605 (San Gabriel River Freeway)	I-605 exit 11
Los Angeles	Downey	124.97	201.12	125	SR 19 (Lakewood Boulevard, Rosemead Boulevard)	
Los Angeles	Downey	125.61	202.15	126A	Paramount Boulevard	
Los Angeles	Montebello–Commerce line	126.36	203.36	126B	Slauson Avenue	No northbound entrance
Los Angeles	Montebello–Commerce line	127.54	205.26	128A	Bandini Boulevard, Garfield Avenue	Bandini Boulevard not signed northbound
Los Angeles	Commerce	128.21	206.33	128B	Washington Boulevard	
Los Angeles	Commerce	129.46	208.35	129	Atlantic Boulevard, Eastern Avenue	Southbound signage; former SR 15
Los Angeles	Commerce	129.46	208.35	129	Atlantic Boulevard north	Northbound signage
Los Angeles	Commerce	129.71	208.75	130A	Atlantic Boulevard south to I-710 south (Long Beach Freeway)	Northbound exit and northbound entrance
Los Angeles	Commerce	129.71	208.75	130A	Triggs Street	Southbound exit and southbound entrance
Los Angeles	Commerce	130.44	209.92	130B	Eastern Avenue	Northbound exit only
Los Angeles	Commerce	130.54	210.08	130C	I-710 north (Long Beach Freeway) – Pasadena	Northbound left exit and southbound left entrance; I-710 south exit 18
Los Angeles	Commerce	130.54	210.08	130B	I-710 south (Long Beach Freeway) – Long Beach	Southbound exit and northbound entrance; northbound access is via exit 130A; I-710 north exit 18A
Los Angeles	East Los Angeles	130.81	210.52	131A	Olympic Boulevard	Southbound exit and northbound entrance; former SR 26 / SR 245
Los Angeles	East Los Angeles	131.46	211.56	131B	Ditman Avenue, Indiana Street	Signed as exit 131 northbound
Los Angeles	Los Angeles	131.60	211.79	132	Indiana Street, Calzona Street	
Los Angeles	Los Angeles	132.86	213.82	133	Grande Vista Avenue	Northbound exit; southbound entrance via Concord Street
Los Angeles	Los Angeles	133.37	214.64	—	US 101 north (Santa Ana Freeway north) – Los Angeles	I-5 south transitions onto Santa Ana Freeway south southern end of Golden State Freeway; northbound left exit and southbound entrance; south end of East Los Angeles Interchange proper; southern terminus of US 101; access to Los Angeles Civic Center
Los Angeles	Los Angeles	133.37	214.64	134A	I-10 west (Santa Monica Freeway) – Santa Monica	Northbound exit signage
Los Angeles	Los Angeles	133.37	214.64	134B	Soto Street	Signed as exit 134A southbound; former exit 133A northbound
Los Angeles	Los Angeles	133.37	214.64	134B	SR 60 east (Pomona Freeway) – Pomona	Southbound left exit and northbound entrance; SR 60 east exit 1A, west exit 1E
Los Angeles	Los Angeles	133.41	214.70	134C	Seventh Street	No southbound exit; left exit northbound, formerly exit 133B
Los Angeles	Los Angeles	133.41	214.70	—	I-10 west (Santa Monica Freeway) – Santa Monica	Southern end of I-10 overlap; southbound exit signage; I-5 south follows I-10 exit 16B; north end of East Los Angeles Interchange proper
Los Angeles	Los Angeles	134.22	216.01	135A	Fourth Street	Former SR 60
Los Angeles	Los Angeles	135.11	217.44	135B	Cesar Chavez Avenue	Northbound exit and southbound entrance; formerly Brooklyn Avenue
Los Angeles	Los Angeles	135.45	217.99	135C	I-10 east (San Bernardino Freeway) – San Bernardino	Northern end of I-10 overlap; 5-10 Split portion of the East Los Angeles Interchange; signed as exit 135B southbound; I-10 exit 19B
Los Angeles	Los Angeles			—	Marengo Street	Northbound entrance only
Los Angeles	Los Angeles	135.45	217.99	135C	Mission Road	No northbound exit
Los Angeles	Los Angeles	135.86– 136.39	218.65– 219.50	136A	Main Street	Signed as exit 136 southbound; no entrance ramps
Los Angeles	Los Angeles	136.39	219.50	136B	Broadway	Southbound exit is part of exit 137A
Los Angeles	Los Angeles	137.10	220.64	137A	SR 110 north (Arroyo Seco Parkway) – Pasadena	Signed as exit 137B northbound; SR 110 south exit 26B
Los Angeles	Los Angeles	137.10	220.64	137A	Figueroa Street	Southbound exit is part of exit 137B; former SR 159 / SR 163 north
Los Angeles	Los Angeles	137.36	221.06	137B	SR 110 south (Arroyo Seco Parkway) – Los Angeles	Southbound exit and northbound entrance; SR 110 north exit 26A
Los Angeles	Los Angeles	138.49	222.88	138	Stadium Way	
Los Angeles	Los Angeles	139.21	224.04	139	SR 2 (Glendale Freeway) – Glendale, Echo Park	Signed as exits 139A (north) and 139B (south) northbound; SR 2 north exit 13, south exit 13A
Los Angeles	Los Angeles	139.68	224.79	140A	Fletcher Drive	Southbound exit and northbound entrance; former SR 2
Los Angeles	Los Angeles	140.32	225.82	140B	Glendale Boulevard	Signed as exit 140 northbound
Los Angeles	Los Angeles	140.82	226.63	141A	Los Feliz Boulevard	Signed as exit 141 southbound
Los Angeles	Los Angeles	140.99	226.90	141B	Griffith Park	Northbound exit and southbound entrance
Los Angeles	Los Angeles	142.44	229.23	142	Colorado Street (SR 5S east)	Former SR 134 east / SR 163 south
Los Angeles	Los Angeles	143.74	231.33	144A	SR 134 east (Ventura Freeway) – Glendale, Pasadena	Signed as exit 144 southbound; SR 134 west exit 5; northbound exit provides direct access to Zoo Drive, which serves the Los Angeles Zoo
Los Angeles	Los Angeles	143.74	231.33	144B	SR 134 west (Ventura Freeway) – Ventura	Northbound exit and southbound entrance; southbound access is via exit 145A; SR 134 east exits 5A-B
Los Angeles	Glendale	144.50	232.55	145A	Western Avenue to SR 134 west	"To SR 134" not signed northbound
Los Angeles	Burbank	145.09	233.50	145B	Alameda Avenue	Former SR 134 west
Los Angeles	Burbank	145.82	234.67	146A	Olive Avenue, Verdugo Avenue	
Los Angeles	Burbank	146.44	235.67	146B	Burbank Boulevard	
Los Angeles	Burbank	147.27	237.01	147A	Scott Road	Former interchange with no southbound entrance; closed as part of the Empire Avenue interchange project
Los Angeles	Burbank	147.30	237.06	147B	Lincoln Street	Former northbound exit and southbound entrance; closed as part of the Empire Avenue interchange project
Los Angeles	Burbank	147.41	237.23	147	Empire Avenue, North San Fernando Boulevard	Serves Hollywood Burbank Airport
Los Angeles	Burbank	147.89	238.01	148	Buena Vista Street	
Los Angeles	Los Angeles	149.01	239.81	149	Hollywood Way	Serves Hollywood Burbank Airport
Los Angeles	Los Angeles	149.94	241.31	150A	Glenoaks Boulevard	Northbound exit and southbound entrance
Los Angeles	Los Angeles	150.34	241.95	150B	Sunland Boulevard – Sun Valley	Signed as exit 150 southbound
Los Angeles	Los Angeles	150.94	242.91	151	Penrose Street	No northbound entrance
Los Angeles	Los Angeles	151.65	244.06	152	Lankershim Boulevard, Tuxford Street	Former SR 170
Los Angeles	Los Angeles	152.60	245.59	153A	Sheldon Street	
Los Angeles	Los Angeles	153.02	246.26	153B	SR 170 south (Hollywood Freeway) – Hollywood	Southbound exit and northbound entrance; northern terminus of SR 170; SR 170 north exit 11B
Los Angeles	Los Angeles			♢	SR 170 south	HOV access only; southbound exit and northbound entrance
Los Angeles	Los Angeles	153.02	246.26	153B	Branford Street	Northbound exit and southbound entrance
Los Angeles	Los Angeles	154.07	247.95	154	Osborne Street – Arleta	
Los Angeles	Los Angeles	154.62	248.84	155A	Terra Bella Street	Northbound exit and southbound entrance
Los Angeles	Los Angeles	155.16	249.71	155B	Van Nuys Boulevard – Pacoima	Northbound exit and southbound entrance
Los Angeles	Los Angeles	155.72	250.61	156A	Paxton Street to SR 118 west	Signed as exit 156B northbound; "To SR 118" not signed northbound
Los Angeles	Los Angeles	156.02	251.09	156B	SR 118 east (Ronald Reagan Freeway)	Signed as exit 156A northbound; SR 118 east exit 44A
Los Angeles	Los Angeles	156.02	251.09	156B	SR 118 west (Ronald Reagan Freeway)	Northbound exit and southbound entrance; southbound exit is via exit 156A; SR 118 west exit 44A
Los Angeles	Los Angeles	156.64	252.09	157A	Brand Boulevard – San Fernando	Northbound exit and southbound entrance; former SR 118
Los Angeles	Los Angeles	156.90	252.51	157B	San Fernando Mission Boulevard – San Fernando	Signed as exit 157 southbound; former US 6 south / US 99 south
Los Angeles	Los Angeles	158.26	254.69	158	I-405 south (San Diego Freeway) – Santa Monica	Southbound exit and northbound entrance; northern terminus of I-405; former SR 7 south
Los Angeles	Los Angeles	158.26	254.69	—	I-5 Truck south to I-405 south	Southbound truck route
Los Angeles	Los Angeles	159.31	256.38	159	Roxford Street – Sylmar	Signed as exits 159A (east) and 159B (west) northbound
Los Angeles	Los Angeles	160.67	258.57	161A	I-210 east (Foothill Freeway) – Pasadena	Signed as exit 161 northbound; western terminus of I-210; I-210 west exits 1A-B
Los Angeles	Los Angeles	160.67	258.57	—	I-5 Truck north to SR 14 north	South end of truck route; south end of Newhall Pass interchange at Newhall Pass
Los Angeles	Los Angeles			♢	SR 14 north	HOV access only; northbound exit and southbound entrance
Los Angeles	Los Angeles	161.09	259.25	161B	Balboa Boulevard, San Fernando Road	Southbound exit only; northbound entrance is via Sierra Highway
Los Angeles	Los Angeles	162.24	261.10	162	SR 14 north (Antelope Valley Freeway) – Palmdale, Lancaster	Northern end of HOV lanes on I-5; southern terminus of SR 14; SR 14 south exits 1A-B; southbound entrance provides direct access to I-5 exit 161B
Los Angeles		163.01	262.34	—	I-5 Truck south to SR 14 north / Sierra Highway	North end of truck route; north end of Newhall Pass interchange at Newhall Pass
Los Angeles	Santa Clarita	165.69	266.65	166	Calgrove Boulevard	
Los Angeles	Santa Clarita	166.99	268.74	167	Lyons Avenue, Pico Canyon Road	
Los Angeles	Santa Clarita	168.10	270.53	168	McBean Parkway – Stevenson Ranch	
Los Angeles	Santa Clarita	169.13	272.19	169	Valencia Boulevard	
Los Angeles	Santa Clarita	170.23	273.96	170	Magic Mountain Parkway	Former SR 126 east
Los Angeles	Santa Clarita	170.82	274.91	171	Rye Canyon Road	Southbound exit and southbound entrance
Los Angeles	Santa Clarita	170.82	274.91	Weigh station (northbound only)		
Los Angeles	Santa Clarita	172.14	277.03	172	SR 126 west / Newhall Ranch Road – Ventura	Eastern terminus of SR 126
Los Angeles	Castaic	173.26	278.83	173	Hasley Canyon Road	
Los Angeles	Castaic	175.67	282.71	176A	Parker Road – Castaic	Northbound exit and southbound entrance
Los Angeles	Castaic	176.15	283.49	176B	Lake Hughes Road – Castaic Lake Park, Castaic	Signed as exit 176 southbound
Los Angeles		182.63	293.91	183	Templin Highway	
Los Angeles		191.13	307.59	191	Vista del Lago Road	
Los Angeles		194.62	313.21	195	Smokey Bear Road	
Los Angeles		198.15	318.89	198A	SR 138 east – Lancaster, Palmdale	Northbound exit and southbound entrance; western terminus of SR 138; southbound exit is via exit 199
Los Angeles		198.42	319.33	198	Quail Lake Road	Signed as exit 198B northbound
Los Angeles		198.76	319.87	199	SR 138 east – Lancaster, Palmdale	Southbound exit and northbound entrance; western terminus of SR 138; northbound exit is via exit 198A
Los Angeles		202.46	325.83	202	Gorman	Connects to Gorman School Road
Los Angeles		203.67	327.78	Tejon Pass, elevation 4,144 feet (1,263 m)		
Los Angeles–Kern county line	Lebec	205.23	330.29	205	Frazier Mountain Park Road	
Kern	Lebec	205.97	331.48	Tejon Pass Rest Area		
Kern	Lebec	206.88	332.94	207	Lebec	Connects to Lebec Service Road, Lebec Road
Kern	Lebec	210.29	338.43	210	Fort Tejon	Connects to Lebec Road
Kern		215.42	346.68	215	Grapevine	Connects to Grapevine Road West, Grapevine Road East
Kern		216.64	348.65	Weigh station (southbound only)		
Kern		218.79	352.11	219	Laval Road	Signed as exits 219A (east) and 219B (west)
Kern	Wheeler Ridge	221.13	355.87	221	SR 99 north (Golden State Highway) – Bakersfield, Fresno	Wheeler Ridge Interchange; southern end of West Side Freeway; northbound left exit and southbound left entrance; southern terminus of SR 99; former US 99 north
Kern	Wheeler Ridge	221.13	355.87	—	I-5 Truck south	Southbound truck bypass
Kern		224.88	361.91	225	SR 166 (Maricopa Highway) – Mettler, Maricopa, Taft	
Kern		228.16	367.19	228	Copus Road	
Kern		234.34	377.13	234	Old River Road	
Kern		238.76	384.25	239	SR 223 east (Bear Mountain Boulevard) – Arvin	
Kern		244.06	392.78	244	SR 119 (Taft Highway) – Pumpkin Center, Lamont	Former US 399
Kern		246.46	396.64	246	SR 43 (Enos Lane) – Shafter, Wasco, Taft, Maricopa	
Kern		252.82	406.87	253	SR 58 east (Stockdale Highway) – Bakersfield	Southern end of SR 58 overlap
Kern	Buttonwillow	257.42	414.28	257	SR 58 west – Buttonwillow, McKittrick	Northern end of SR 58 overlap
Kern	Buttonwillow	259.38	417.43	Buttonwillow Rest Area		
Kern		261.91	421.50	262	7th Standard Road, Rowlee Road	Northbound exit and southbound entrance
Kern		263.28	423.71	263	Buttonwillow, McKittrick	Southbound exit and northbound entrance; connects to Buttonwillow Drive
Kern		267.88	431.11	268	Lerdo Highway – Shafter	
Kern	Lost Hills	278.29	447.86	278	SR 46 – Lost Hills, Paso Robles, Wasco	Former US 466
Kern		287.62	462.88	288	Twisselman Road	
Kings		304.66	490.30	305	Utica Avenue	
Kings	Kettleman City	308.90	497.13	309	SR 41 (E.G. Lewis Highway) – Kettleman City, Fresno, Paso Robles	
Kings–Fresno county line	Avenal	319.25	513.78	319	SR 269 (Lassen Avenue)	
Fresno		320.45	515.71	Avenal-Coalinga Rest Area		
Fresno		324.52	522.26	325	Jayne Avenue	Connects to SR 198 west
Fresno		333.89	537.34	334	SR 198 – Lemoore, Hanford	
Fresno		336.98	542.32	337	SR 33 south – Coalinga	Southbound signage; southern end of SR 33 overlap
Fresno		336.98	542.32	337	SR 145 north – Kerman	Northbound signage; southern terminus of SR 145
Fresno		348.98	561.63	349	SR 33 north (Derrick Avenue) – Mendota	Northern end of SR 33 overlap
Fresno		357.38	575.15	357	Kamm Avenue	
Fresno		364.82	587.12	365	Manning Avenue	
Fresno		368.01	592.25	368	Panoche Road	
Fresno		371.77	598.31	372	Russell Avenue	
Fresno		379.10	610.10	379	Shields Avenue (CR J1) – Mendota	
Fresno		384.80	619.28	385	Nees Avenue – Firebaugh	
Merced		385.83	620.93	John Erreca Safety Roadside Rest Area		
Merced		391.46	629.99	391	SR 165 north (Mercey Springs Road) – Los Banos	Southern terminus of SR 165
Merced		402.76	648.18	403A	SR 33 south / SR 152 east – Los Banos, Fresno	
Merced		402.76	648.18	403B	SR 33 north / SR 152 west – Gilroy, Hollister, San Jose, Monterey	
Merced	Santa Nella	407.02	655.04	407	SR 33 – Santa Nella, Gustine, Gilroy	
Merced		408.40	657.26	Weigh station		
Merced		417.57	672.01	418	SR 140 east – Gustine, Merced	Western terminus of SR 140
Stanislaus		423.17	681.03	423	Stuhr Road (CR J18) – Newman	
Stanislaus		428.38	689.41	428	Fink Road – Crows Landing	
Stanislaus	Patterson	433.52	697.68	434	Diablo Grande Parkway, Sperry Avenue (CR J17) – Patterson	
Stanislaus		440.73	709.29	441	Howard Road (CR J16) – Westley	
Stanislaus		444.86	715.93	Westley Rest Area		
San Joaquin		446.35	718.33	446	I-580 west – Tracy, San Francisco	Northbound left exit and southbound left entrance; eastern terminus of I-580; southbound access is via exit 458B
San Joaquin		449.16	722.85	449A	SR 132 east – Modesto	
San Joaquin		449.16	722.85	449B	SR 132 west – San Francisco	Connects to I-580
San Joaquin		452.22	727.78	452	SR 33 south (Ahern Road) – Tracy, Vernalis	Northern terminus of SR 33; Ahern Road north of I-5 is former SR 33 north
San Joaquin		456.78	735.12	457	Kasson Road (CR J4)	
San Joaquin		457.52	736.31	458A	I-205 BL west (Eleventh Street) – Tracy	Southbound exit and northbound entrance; former US 50 west
San Joaquin	Lathrop	458.34	737.63	458B	I-205 west (Robert T. Monagan Freeway) to I-580 west – San Francisco	Southbound exit and northbound entrance; eastern terminus of I-205
San Joaquin	Lathrop	459.59	739.64	460	Mossdale Road, Manthey Road	
San Joaquin	Lathrop	460.55	741.18	461	SR 120 east – Manteca, Sonora	Western terminus of SR 120; SR 120 exits 1A-B
San Joaquin	Lathrop	462.19	743.82	462	Louise Avenue	
San Joaquin	Lathrop	463.24	745.51	463	Lathrop Road	
San Joaquin	Lathrop	465.30	748.83	465	Roth Road – Sharpe Depot	
San Joaquin	French Camp	466.57	750.87	467A	El Dorado Street	Northbound exit and southbound entrance; former US 50 east
San Joaquin	French Camp	467.16	751.82	467B	Mathews Road	Signed as exit 467 southbound
San Joaquin	Stockton	468.26	753.59	468	French Camp Road (CR J9), Arch Airport Road	
San Joaquin	Stockton	469.38	755.39	469	Downing Avenue, Carolyn Weston Boulevard	
San Joaquin	Stockton	470.36	756.97	470	Eighth Street	
San Joaquin	Stockton	471.07	758.11	471	SR 4 west (Charter Way / SR 4 Bus. east)	Southern end of SR 4 overlap; former SR 4 east
San Joaquin	Stockton	471.91	759.47	472	SR 4 east to Navy Drive / SR 99 – Downtown Stockton	Northern end of SR 4 overlap; serves the Port of Stockton; SR 4 exits 65A-B
San Joaquin	Stockton	472.71	760.75	473	Pershing Avenue, Oak Street, Fremont Street	
San Joaquin	Stockton	473.64	762.25	474A	Monte Diablo Avenue	
San Joaquin	Stockton	474.25	763.23	474B	Country Club Boulevard, Alpine Avenue	
San Joaquin	Stockton	475.71	765.58	476	March Lane	
San Joaquin	Stockton	477.17	767.93	477	Benjamin Holt Drive	
San Joaquin	Stockton	478.38	769.88	478	Hammer Lane	
San Joaquin	Stockton	481.02	774.13	481	Eight Mile Road	
San Joaquin		485.27	780.97	485	SR 12 – Lodi, Fairfield	
San Joaquin		487.39	784.38	487	Turner Road	
San Joaquin		490.43	789.27	490	Peltier Road (CR J12)	
San Joaquin		493.33	793.94	493	Thornton, Walnut Grove	Connects to CR J11
Sacramento		497.67	800.92	498	Twin Cities Road (CR E13)	
Sacramento		504.03	811.16	504	Hood Franklin Road	
Sacramento	Elk Grove	506.37	814.92	506	Elk Grove Boulevard	Connects to CR E12
Sacramento	Elk Grove	507.58	816.87	508	Laguna Boulevard	
Sacramento	Sacramento	509.91	820.62	510	Cosumnes River Boulevard	
Sacramento	Sacramento	511.69	823.49	512	Pocket Road, Meadowview Road	Connects to SR 160
Sacramento	Sacramento	512.73	825.16	513	Florin Road	
Sacramento	Sacramento	514.19	827.51	514	43rd Avenue	Southbound exit and northbound entrance
Sacramento	Sacramento	514.84	828.55	515	Fruitridge Road, Seamas Avenue	
Sacramento	Sacramento	516.07	830.53	516	Sutterville Road	
Sacramento	Sacramento	518.11	833.82	518	US 50 (I-80 BL/I-305) to SR 99 south – South Lake Tahoe, San Francisco	Southern end of SR 99 overlap; former I-80; US 50/I-80 BL exit 4A; provides direct access to Broadway
Sacramento	Sacramento	518.72	834.80	519A	Q Street	Entrances are via P Street; serves Golden 1 Center
Sacramento	Sacramento	519.34	835.80	519B	J Street – Downtown Sacramento	Entrances are via I Street; serves Golden 1 Center
Sacramento	Sacramento	520.19	837.16	520	Richards Boulevard	
Sacramento	Sacramento	520.88	838.28	521A	Garden Highway	Signed as exit 521 southbound
Sacramento	Sacramento	521.51	839.29	521B	West El Camino Avenue	Northbound exit and southbound entrance
Sacramento	Sacramento	522.26	840.50	522	I-80 – San Francisco, Reno	Former I-880; I-80 exit 86
Sacramento	Sacramento	523.59	842.64	524	Arena Boulevard	
Sacramento	Sacramento	524.56	844.20	525A	Del Paso Road	
Sacramento	Sacramento	525.45	845.63	525B	SR 99 north – Yuba City, Marysville	Northern end of SR 99 overlap; SR 99 exit 306
Sacramento				527	Metro Air Parkway	
Sacramento		528.27	850.17	528	Sacramento International Airport	Connects to Airport Boulevard
Sacramento		529.26	851.76	Elkhorn Rest Area (southbound only)		
Yolo		530.71	854.09	531	Road 22	Former SR 16
Yolo	Yolo Bypass	530.71	854.09	Elkhorn Causeway		
Yolo	Woodland	535.72	862.16	536	Road 102 (CR E8)	
Yolo	Woodland	537.28	864.67	537	Main Street (I-5 Bus. north) to SR 113 south – Woodland	Northbound exit and southbound entrance; former SR 16
Yolo	Woodland	537.28	864.67	537	SR 113 south – Davis	Southern end of SR 113 overlap; southbound exit and northbound entrance
Yolo	Woodland	538.45	866.55	538	SR 113 north (East Street) – Yuba City	Northern end of SR 113 overlap
Yolo		539.60	868.40	540	West Street	
Yolo		541.00	870.66	541	SR 16 west (I-5 Bus. south) – Esparto	
Yolo		542.53	873.12	542	Yolo	Connects to Road 17
Yolo		547.81	881.61	548	Zamora	Connects to Road 13, CR E10
Yolo		552.80	889.65	553	I-505 south – Winters, San Francisco	Southbound exit and northbound entrance; northern terminus of I-505
Yolo	Dunnigan	553.98	891.54	554	Road 8	
Yolo	Dunnigan	555.76	894.41	556	Dunnigan	Connects to Road 6, CR E4
Yolo	Dunnigan	556.52	895.63	Dunnigan Rest Area		
Yolo–Colusa county line		559.11	899.80	559	County Line Road	
Colusa	Arbuckle	565.90	910.73	566	Arbuckle, College City	No northbound entrance; connects to I-5 BL north
Colusa	Arbuckle	566.81	912.19	567	Frontage Road (I-5 BL south) – Arbuckle	Former US 99W
Colusa		569.42	916.39	569	Hahn Road	
Colusa	Williams	575.02	925.40	575	Husted Road (I-5 Bus. north)	
Colusa	Williams	577.09	928.74	577	Williams	Connects to SR 20 Bus.
Colusa	Williams	577.83	929.93	578	SR 20 – Clear Lake, Colusa	
Colusa		583.41	938.91	Maxwell Rest Area		
Colusa		585.84	942.82	586	Maxwell Road	
Colusa		588.36	946.87	588	Maxwell	Southbound exit and northbound entrance; former US 99W; connects to I-5 Bus. south
Colusa		590.95	951.04	591	Delevan Road	
Glenn		595.00	957.56	595	Road 68 – Princeton	
Glenn	Willows	601.09	967.36	601	Road 57 (I-5 Bus. north)	
Glenn	Willows	603.35	971.00	603	SR 162 – Willows, Oroville	
Glenn		607.38	977.48	607	Road 39 – Bayliss	
Glenn		608.00	978.48	Willows Rest Area		
Glenn		610.28	982.15	610	Artois	Connects to Road 33
Glenn		614.30	988.62	614	Road 27	
Glenn	Orland	618.30	995.06	618	South Street, Road 16	
Glenn	Orland	619.29	996.65	619	SR 32 – Orland, Chico	Western terminus of SR 32
Glenn		621.29	999.87	621	Road 7 (I-5 Bus. south)	
Tehama		628.00	1,010.67	628	Liberal Avenue, Road 99W	
Tehama	Corning	629.72	1,013.44	630	South Avenue	
Tehama	Corning	631.21	1,015.83	631	Corning Road, Solano Street (CR A9)	
Tehama		632.73	1,018.28	Lt. John C. Helmick Rest Area		
Tehama		632.77	1,018.34	633	Finnell Avenue – Richfield	
Tehama		636.20	1,023.86	636	Gyle Road (CR A11) – Tehama, Los Molinos	
Tehama		642.01	1,033.21	642	Flores Avenue – Proberta, Gerber	
Tehama	Red Bluff	647.10	1,041.41	647A	South Main Street (I-5 BL north / Historic US 99 north / CR A8 south)	Signed as exit 647 northbound; former US 99W
Tehama	Red Bluff	647.17	1,041.52	647B	Diamond Avenue	Southbound exit and northbound entrance
Tehama	Red Bluff	648.76	1,044.08	649	SR 36 (Antelope Boulevard) to SR 99 – Chico	Former US 99E
Tehama	Red Bluff	649.70	1,045.59	650	Adobe Road	
Tehama	Red Bluff	650.61	1,047.06	651	Main Street (I-5 BL south / Historic US 99 south)	Southbound exit and northbound entrance; connects to SR 36 west; northern end of West Side Freeway
Tehama	Red Bluff	651.78	1,048.94	652	Wilcox Golf Road	
Tehama		652.98	1,050.87	653	Jellys Ferry Road	
Tehama		655.66	1,055.18	Herbert S. Miles Rest Area		
Tehama		657.11	1,057.52	657	Auction Yard Road, Hooker Creek Road	
Tehama		659.46	1,061.30	659	Sunset Hills Drive, Auction Yard Road	
Tehama		660.74	1,063.36	Weigh station		
Tehama		662.27	1,065.82	662	Bowman Road / CR A17 – Cottonwood	
Cottonwood Creek		662.86	1,066.77	Bridge		
Shasta	Cottonwood	663.76	1,068.22	664	Gas Point Road	
Shasta	Cottonwood	664.76	1,069.83	665	Cottonwood	Southbound exit and northbound entrance; connects to Main Street
Shasta	Anderson	666.24	1,072.21	667A	SR 273 north (Historic US 99 north)	Northbound exit and southbound entrance; southern terminus of SR 273
Shasta	Anderson	667.14	1,073.66	667B	Deschutes Road, Factory Outlets Drive	Signed as exit 667 southbound; no southbound entrance
Shasta	Anderson	668.49	1,075.83	668	Balls Ferry Road	Northbound signage
Shasta	Anderson	668.49	1,075.83	668	North Street	Southbound signage
Shasta	Anderson	669.59	1,077.60	670	Riverside Avenue	
Shasta		672.62	1,082.48	673	Knighton Road – Redding Airport	
Shasta	Redding	675.00	1,086.31	675	South Bonnyview Road, Churn Creek Road	
Shasta	Redding	677.31	1,090.02	677	Cypress Avenue	
Shasta	Redding	678.30	1,091.62	678	SR 44 – Eureka, Lassen National Park	Signed as exits 678A (east) and 678B (west) southbound; SR 44 exits 2A-B; northbound exit to SR 44 east provides direct access to Hilltop Drive
Shasta	Redding	680.17	1,094.63	680	SR 299 (Lake Boulevard)	
Shasta	Redding	680.92	1,095.83	681A	Twin View Boulevard	Signed as exit 681 northbound
Shasta	Redding	681.33	1,096.49	681B	SR 273 (Market Street / Historic US 99 south)	Southbound exit and northbound entrance; northern terminus of SR 273
Shasta	Redding	682.25	1,097.97	682	Oasis Road	
Shasta	Shasta Lake	683.85	1,100.55	684	Pine Grove Avenue	
Shasta	Shasta Lake	684.99	1,102.38	685	SR 151 (Shasta Dam Boulevard)	Eastern terminus of SR 151
Shasta	Shasta Lake	686.93	1,105.51	687	Wonderland Boulevard – Mountain Gate	
Shasta		688.89	1,108.66	689	Fawndale Road, Wonderland Boulevard	
Shasta		690.48	1,111.22	690	Bridge Bay Road	
Shasta		690.56	1,111.35	Pit River Bridge over Shasta Lake		
Shasta		692.17	1,113.94	692	Turntable Bay Road	
Shasta		693.45	1,116.00	693	Packers Bay Road	Southbound exit and southbound entrance
Shasta		693.88	1,116.69	O'Brien Rest Area (northbound only)		
Shasta		695.01	1,118.51	695	Shasta Caverns Road – O'Brien	
Shasta		698.18	1,123.61	698	Gilman Road, Salt Creek Road	
Shasta	Lakehead-Lakeshore	702.40	1,130.40	702	Lakeshore Drive, Antlers Road	
Shasta	Lakehead-Lakeshore	703.66	1,132.43	704	Riverview Drive – Lakehead	
Shasta	Lakehead-Lakeshore	704.50	1,133.78	Lakehead Rest Area (southbound only)		
Shasta		707.11	1,137.98	707	Vollmers, Delta	Connects to Delta School Road
Shasta		710.31	1,143.13	710	Slate Creek Road – La Moine	
Shasta		711.97	1,145.80	712	Pollard Flat	Connects to Pollard Camp Road
Shasta		713.76	1,148.69	714	Gibson Road	
Shasta		718.27	1,155.94	718	Sims Road	
Shasta		720.21	1,159.07	720	Flume Creek Road	
Shasta		721.37	1,160.93	721	Conant Road	
Shasta		722.61	1,162.93	723	Sweetbrier Avenue	
Shasta		724.44	1,165.87	724	Castella	Connects to Castle Creek Road
Shasta		726.27	1,168.82	726	Soda Creek Road	
Shasta		726.86	1,169.77	727	Crag View Drive	Northbound exit only
Shasta		727.70	1,171.12	728	Railroad Park Road, Crag View Drive	
Siskiyou		728.57	1,172.52	729	Dunsmuir Avenue (I-5 BL north / Historic US 99 north)	
Siskiyou	Dunsmuir	730.39	1,175.45	730	Dunsmuir Avenue (I-5 BL / Historic US 99)	Serves Dunsmuir station
Siskiyou	Dunsmuir	731.72	1,177.59	732	Siskiyou Avenue, Dunsmuir Avenue (I-5 BL south / Historic US 99 south)	
Siskiyou	Dunsmuir	733.78	1,180.90	734	Mott Road	
Siskiyou		734.28	1,181.71	Weigh station (southbound only)		
Siskiyou		736.36	1,185.06	736	SR 89 – McCloud, Reno	Northern terminus of SR 89
Siskiyou		736.70	1,185.60	737	South Mount Shasta Boulevard (I-5 BL north / Historic US 99 north)	Northbound exit and southbound entrance
Siskiyou	Mount Shasta	738.37	1,188.29	738	West Lake Street (CR A10)	
Siskiyou	Mount Shasta	739.94	1,190.82	740	North Mount Shasta Boulevard (I-5 BL south / Historic US 99 south)	Southbound exit and northbound entrance
Siskiyou	Mount Shasta	741.06	1,192.62	741	Abrams Lake Road	
Siskiyou		743.22	1,196.10	743	Summit Drive, Truck Village Drive	
Siskiyou	Weed	745.32	1,199.48	745	Vista Drive (I-5 BL north)	
Siskiyou	Weed	746.95	1,202.10	747	US 97 (South Weed Boulevard / I-5 BL north / Historic US 99 north) – Klamath Falls	Southern terminus of US 97
Siskiyou	Weed	747.74	1,203.37	748	SR 265 south (North Weed Boulevard / I-5 BL south / Historic US 99 south)	Northern terminus of SR 265
Siskiyou		750.54	1,207.88	751	Stewart Springs Road – Edgewood, Gazelle	
Siskiyou		753.43	1,212.53	753	Weed Airport Road	Serves Weed Airport, Weed Rest Area
Siskiyou		758.72	1,221.04	759	Louie Road	
Siskiyou	Grenada	765.75	1,232.36	766	Montague, Grenada, Gazelle	Connects to CR A12
Siskiyou		770.05	1,239.28	770	Easy Street, Shamrock Road	
Siskiyou	Yreka	773.10	1,244.18	773	To SR 3 (I-5 BL north / Historic US 99 north) – Yreka, Fort Jones, Etna	Connects to Moonlit Oaks Avenue
Siskiyou	Yreka	775.04	1,247.31	775	Miner Street, North Foothill Drive	
Siskiyou	Yreka	775.72	1,248.40	776	SR 3 (I-5 BL south / Historic US 99 south) – Montague	
Siskiyou		785.81	1,264.64	786	SR 96 west (Klamath River Highway) – Willow Creek	Eastern terminus of SR 96; serves Randolf Collier Rest Area
Siskiyou	Hornbrook	789.03	1,269.82	789	Henley, Hornbrook (CR A28)	
Siskiyou	Hornbrook	790.40	1,272.03	790	Hornbrook Highway, Ditch Creek Road	
Siskiyou		790.32	1,271.90	Agricultural Inspection Station (southbound only)		
Siskiyou		793.00	1,276.21	793	Bailey Hill Road	
Siskiyou		795.81	1,280.73	796	Hilt	Connects to Hilt Road
Siskiyou		796.77	1,282.28		I-5 north – Medford, Portland	Continuation into Oregon
1.000 mi = 1.609 km; 1.000 km = 0.621 mi: Closed/former; Concurrency terminus; Electronic toll collection; HOV only; Incomplete access; Route transition

== Unsigned State Route 5S ==
There are two non-contiguous, unsigned special routes of I-5 in Los Angeles County that both carry the hidden state designation of Route 5S (for "supplemental").

=== Colorado Street Freeway Extension (exit 142) ===
The Colorado Street Freeway Extension is a short freeway spur that originally carried State Route 134 until it was moved north onto the Ventura Freeway. Since then, it has been signed as extended off- and on-ramps of I-5 exit 142/Colorado Street, with additional interchanges with Colorado Boulevard, Edenhurst Avenue, and San Fernando Road.

The entire route is in Los Angeles County. All exits are unnumbered.

Location	mi	km	Destinations	Notes
Los Angeles	0.000	0.000	I-5 (Golden State Freeway) – Los Angeles, Sacramento	Western terminus; I-5 exit 142
Los Angeles	0.051	0.082	Colorado Boulevard	Eastbound exit and eastbound entrance
Los Angeles	0.350	0.563	Edenhurst Avenue	Westbound exit and westbound entrance
Glendale	0.550	0.885	San Fernando Road	Eastbound exit only; connects to Elk Avenue
Glendale	0.586	0.943	Colorado Street	Eastern terminus; no left turn to Colorado Street west
1.000 mi = 1.609 km; 1.000 km = 0.621 mi: Incomplete access

=== Newhall Pass truck route ===
The I-5 truck route through the Newhall Pass Interchange in Sylmar also has its own separate exits. The route runs from the I-210 interchange to north of the SR 14 interchange.

The entire route is in Los Angeles County. All exits are unnumbered.

Location	mi	km	Destinations	Notes
Sylmar	0.00	0.00	I-5 south – Los Angeles	South end of I-5 truck route
Sylmar	0.42	0.68	I-210 east (Foothill Freeway) – Pasadena	Southbound exit and northbound entrance
Sylmar	1.57	2.53	Sierra Highway (SR 14U north)	Southbound exit and northbound entrance
Sylmar	1.57	2.53	SR 14 north – Palmdale, Lancaster	No northbound entrance
	2.34	3.77	I-5 north – Sacramento	North end of I-5 truck route
1.000 mi = 1.609 km; 1.000 km = 0.621 mi: Incomplete access

== Related routes ==
There are six signed auxiliary Interstate Highways associated with I-5 in California:

- I-105 runs from SR 1 near El Segundo and Los Angeles International Airport (LAX) east to I-605 in Norwalk.
- I-205 runs from I-580 to I-5, forming the north side of a triangle around Tracy.
- I-405 is a bypass route of I-5, running along the southern and western parts of Greater Los Angeles from Irvine north to near San Fernando.
- I-505 runs from I-80 in Vacaville north to I-5 near Dunnigan.
- I-605 runs from I-405 and SR 22 in Seal Beach north to I-210 in Duarte.
- I-805 is a bypass route of I-5 in the San Diego area, running from the San Diego district of San Ysidro near the Mexico–U.S. border to near Del Mar.

There is also one unsigned auxiliary Interstate Highway: I-305 runs along US 50 from I-80 in West Sacramento to SR 99 in Sacramento.

There is one future auxiliary Interstate Highway: SR 905 from I-5 in San Diego to the Mexico–U.S. border in Otay Mesa is proposed to become I-905.

There are also several business routes of Interstate 5 in California, primarily parts of the original routing of US 99.

== See also ==
Interstate 5
Previous state: Terminus	California	Next state: Oregon
