= O'Brien, California =

Unincorporated community in California, United States

- Unincorporated community
- Location within California Location within the United States
- Coordinates: 40°48′44″N 122°19′27″W
- Country: United States
- State: California
- County: Shasta
- Elevation: 1,234 ft (376 m)
- Time zone: UTC-8 (Pacific (PST))
  - Summer (DST): UTC-7 (PDT)
- ZIP code: 96070
- Area code: 530
- GNIS feature ID: 1659769

O'Brien is an unincorporated community in Shasta County, California, United States. O'Brien is located along Interstate 5, 16 miles (26 km) north of Redding. O'Brien has a post office with ZIP code 96070, which was established in 1945. The community is named after Con O'Brien, who had a resort in the community.
