= Hilt, California =

Town in California, United States

- Unincorporated community
- Location within California Location within the United States
- Coordinates: 41°59′41″N 122°37′24″W
- Country: United States
- State: California
- County: Siskiyou
- Elevation: 2,907 ft (886 m)

Population (2020)
  - Total: 9
- Time zone: UTC-8 (Pacific (PST))
  - Summer (DST): UTC-7 (PDT)
- Area code: 530
- GNIS feature ID: 266807

Hilt (also known as Hilts) is an unincorporated community in Siskiyou County, California, United States. The community is along Interstate 5 near the Oregon border, 18 miles (29 km) north of Yreka. It is named for early settler John Hilt. Hilt was a company town for the Northern California Lumber Co. and the Fruit Growers Supply Co.

Climate data for 41.9947°N 122.6233°W, elevation 2,890 ft (880 m), 1991-2020 normals
Month	Jan	Feb	Mar	Apr	May	Jun	Jul	Aug	Sep	Oct	Nov	Dec	Year
Mean daily maximum °F (°C)	45.5 (7.5)	50.2 (10.1)	55.5 (13.1)	60.8 (16.0)	70.1 (21.2)	78.2 (25.7)	88.7 (31.5)	88.5 (31.4)	81.7 (27.6)	67.9 (19.9)	52.9 (11.6)	44.4 (6.9)	65.4 (18.5)
Daily mean °F (°C)	36.1 (2.3)	39.1 (3.9)	43.2 (6.2)	47.7 (8.7)	55.6 (13.1)	62.3 (16.8)	71.1 (21.7)	70.6 (21.4)	63.7 (17.6)	52.5 (11.4)	41.8 (5.4)	35.3 (1.8)	51.6 (10.9)
Mean daily minimum °F (°C)	26.7 (−2.9)	28.0 (−2.2)	31.0 (−0.6)	34.6 (1.4)	41.0 (5.0)	46.4 (8.0)	53.4 (11.9)	52.6 (11.4)	45.6 (7.6)	37.0 (2.8)	30.7 (−0.7)	26.3 (−3.2)	37.8 (3.2)
Average precipitation inches (mm)	3.57 (91)	2.68 (68)	2.12 (54)	1.63 (41)	1.36 (35)	0.70 (18)	0.36 (9.1)	0.36 (9.1)	0.44 (11)	1.32 (34)	2.88 (73)	4.26 (108)	21.68 (551.2)
Source: PRISM
