= Stone Lakes National Wildlife Refuge =

Wildlife refuge near Sacramento, California

- IUCN category IV (habitat/species management area)
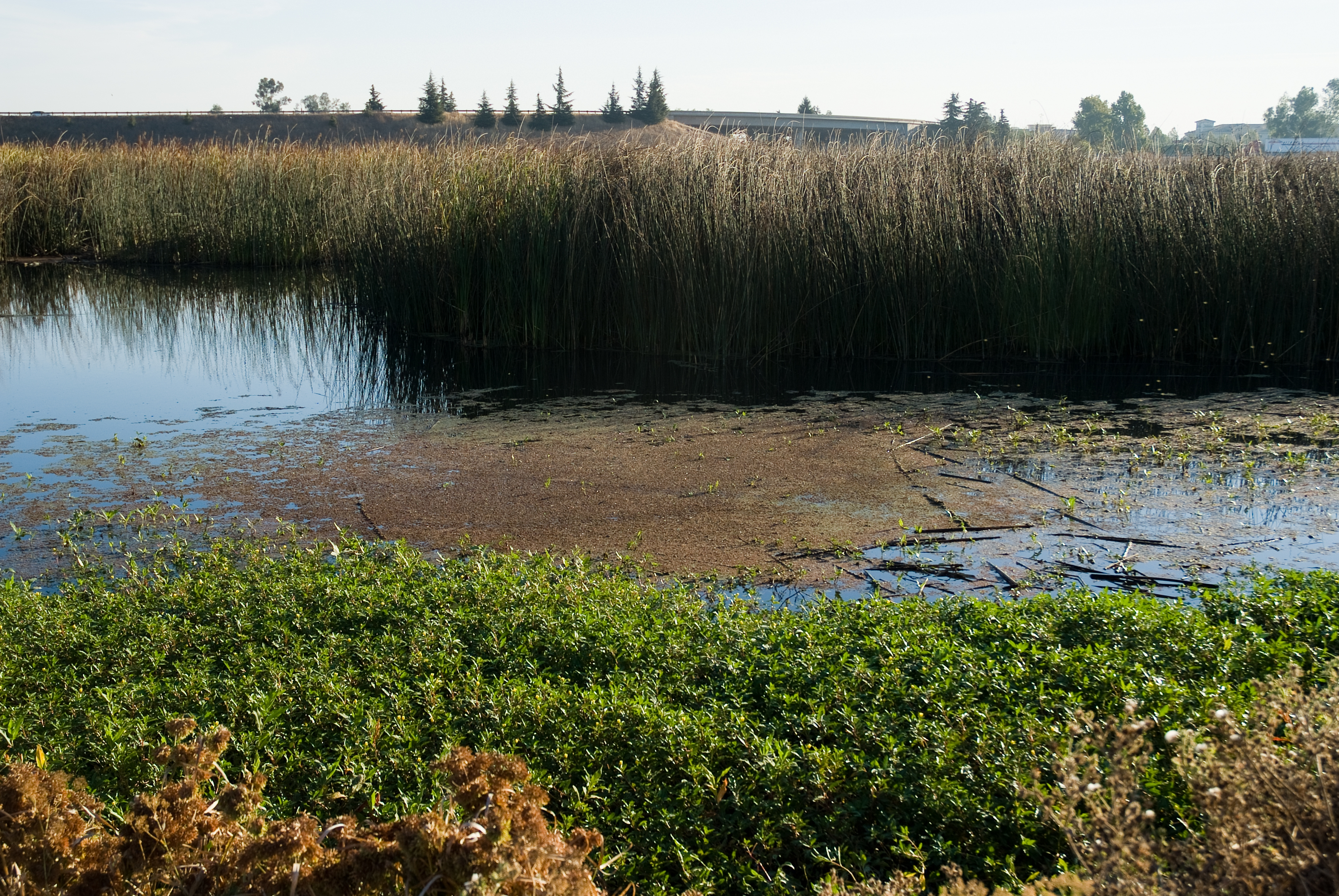

- Location within the United States Location within California
- Location: Sacramento County, California, United States
- Nearest city: Elk Grove, California
- Coordinates: 38°21′55″N 121°29′34″W
- Area: 17,641 acres (71.39 km^{2})
- Established: 1994
- Governing body: U.S. Fish and Wildlife Service
- Website: Stone Lakes National Wildlife Refuge

The Stone Lakes National Wildlife Refuge, located south of Sacramento, California, lies within the Sacramento-San Joaquin delta, the destination of thousands of migrating waterfowl, shorebirds, and other water birds. The refuge was established in 1994.

== Habitats ==
Through a number of innovative partnerships, the refuge is protecting scarce natural habitats and agricultural resources in an area threatened by urban sprawl and agricultural changes. Stone Lakes National Wildlife Refuge contains both seasonal and permanent wetlands, riparian forest, and grasslands, as well as some of the last remaining freshwater lakes in the central valley.

These habitats support large populations of migratory water birds, a major rookery for several colonial nesting species such as great blue herons, and a warm water fishery. Several endangered, threatened, and special-status species benefit from these habitats: the valley elderberry longhorn beetle, Swainson's hawk, and greater sandhill crane.

== Visitors ==
Visitor numbers increase every year; they topped 8,500 in 2001, despite a lack of a visitor education center. The refuge has several paved walking trails and a natural playscape for children. Parking is free. The volunteers from the non-profit Friends of Stone Lakes dedicate their time educating the public about this urban refuge and providing support to the refuge staff.
