= Tijeras Canyon Creek =

- Location of Tijeras Canyon Creek in California

Location
- Country: United States
- State: California

Physical characteristics
- Source: Santa Ana Mountains
  - location: Near Rancho Santa Margarita
  - coordinates: 33°39′40″N 117°33′10″W
  - elevation: 1,901 ft (579 m)
- Mouth: Arroyo Trabuco
  - location: O'Neill Regional Park
  - coordinates: 33°35′31″N 117°37′58″W
  - elevation: 499 ft (152 m)
- Length: 7.03 mi (11.31 km)

Tijeras Canyon Creek is a watercourse in northeast Orange County, California and a tributary of Arroyo Trabuco. It originates in the foothills of the Santa Ana Mountains, and flows southwest through the suburban city of Rancho Santa Margarita for several miles as an underground culvert. Below State Route 241 it becomes a free-flowing creek, traveling through Cañada Vista Park and Tijeras Creek Golf Club before joining with Trabuco Creek in O'Neill Regional Park.

Due to its relatively natural condition, the lower Tijeras Creek provides habitat for the threatened arroyo chub, which is endemic to coastal Southern California streams. Large numbers of native fish were observed there during field studies in 2010.

In March 2010 a force main adjacent to Tijeras Creek ruptured, spilling more than 2,000,000 US gallons (7,600 m^{3}) of raw sewage into the creek. The contaminated water traveled into Trabuco and San Juan Creeks before reaching the Pacific Ocean, forcing a six-day closure at Doheny State Beach.

== See also ==
- List of rivers of Orange County, California
