= Oso Creek =

Tributary of Arroyo Trabuco in Orange County, California

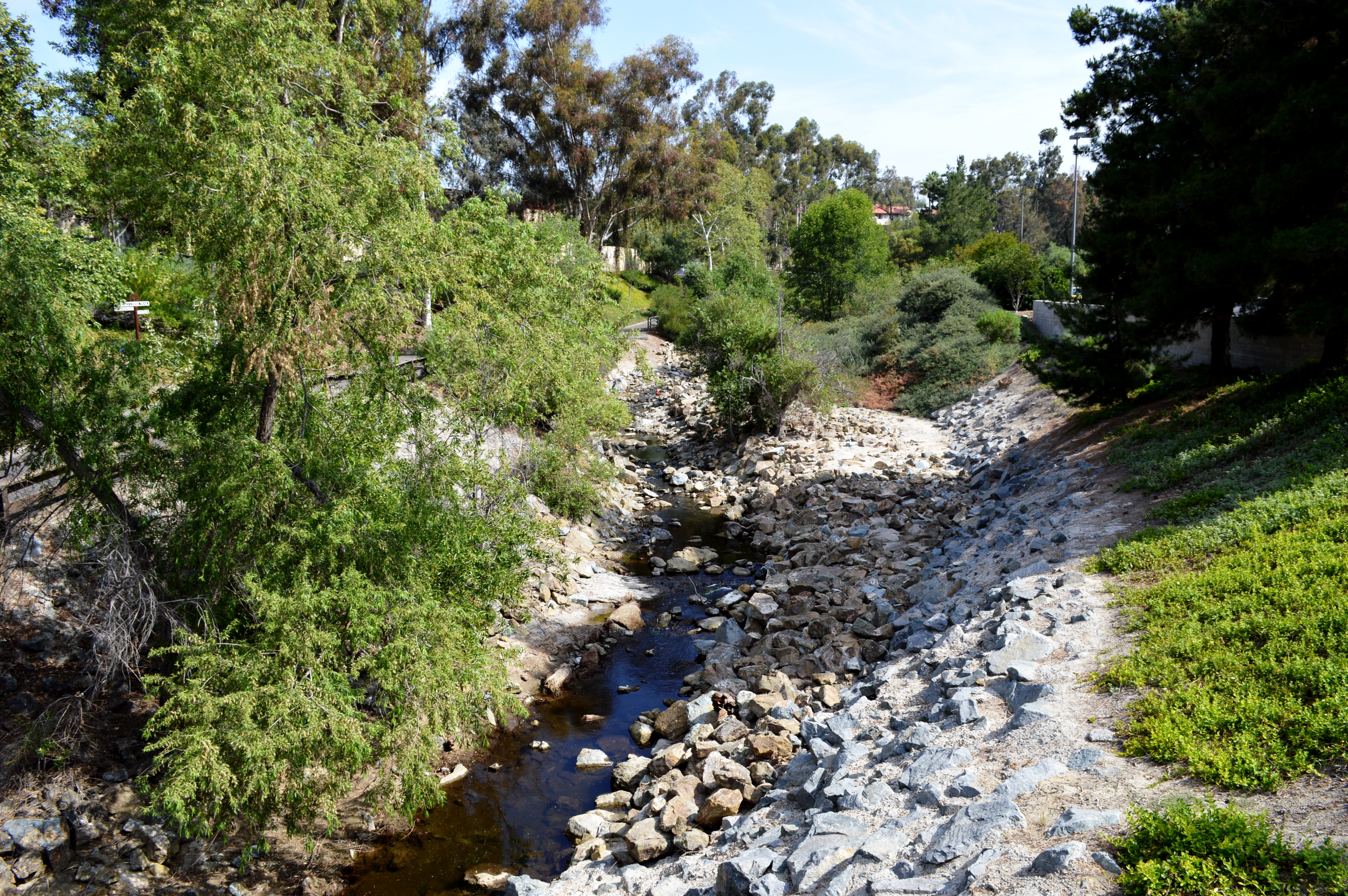
- Oso Creek
- Etymology: Spanish: "Bear Creek"; name origin unknown

Location
- Country: USA
- State: California
- Region: Orange County, Riverside County

Physical characteristics
- Source: Oso Creek Canyon, Santa Ana Mountains
  - coordinates: 33°40′31″N 117°36′28″W
  - elevation: 1,287 ft (392 m)
- Mouth: Trabuco Creek, San Juan Capistrano
  - coordinates: 33°31′10″N 117°40′19″W
  - elevation: 161 ft (49 m)
- Length: 13.5 mi (21.7 km)
- Basin size: 20 mi^{2} (52 km^{2})
- Discharge
  - location: Trabuco Creek
  - average: 33 cu ft/s (0.93 m^{3}/s)
  - maximum: 5,710 cu ft/s (162 m^{3}/s)
- Discharge
  - location: Galivan Basin
  - average: 0 cu ft/s (0 m^{3}/s)

Oso Creek is an approximately 13.5-mile (21.7 km) tributary of Arroyo Trabuco in southern Orange County in the U.S. state of California. Draining about 20 square miles (52 km^{2}) in a region north of the San Joaquin Hills and south of the Santa Ana Mountains, the creek is Trabuco Creek's largest tributary, and is part of the San Juan Creek drainage basin. Beginning in the foothills of the Santa Ana Mountains near the city of Mission Viejo, the creek is dammed twice to form Upper Oso Reservoir and Lake Mission Viejo. The creek is channelized and polluted along much of its length.

"Oso", meaning bear in the Spanish language, was likely the name given to the creek by Spanish conquistadors. Up to the 1970s, the Oso Creek watershed was mostly undeveloped and the creek ephemeral. The watershed lies close to two major wilderness areas - Aliso and Wood Canyons Wilderness Park to the southwest and O'Neill Regional Park to the west, on Trabuco Creek - but has no major parks within its boundaries. Interstate 5 parallels the creek for over half of its length.

== Course ==
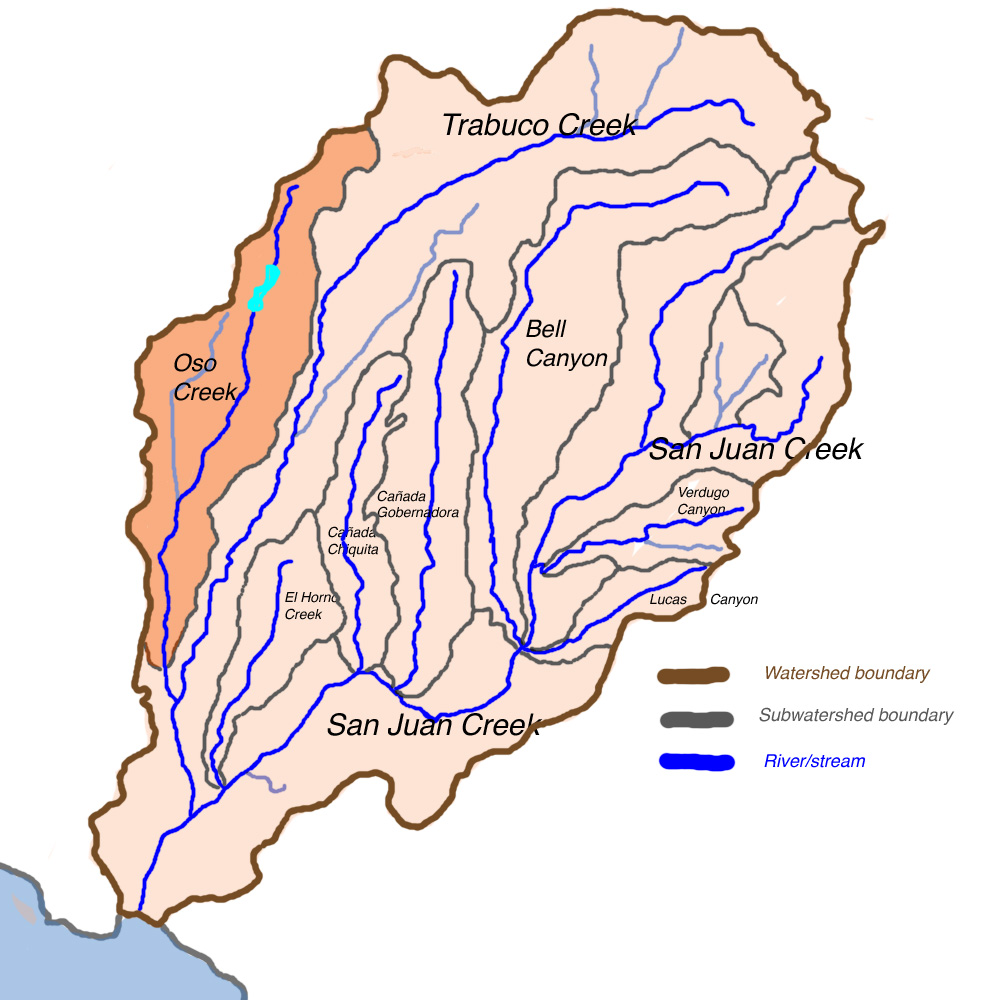
Map of the Oso Creek subwatershed within the San Juan Creek basin

The original headwaters of Oso Creek were in a small canyon in the south-central part of the Santa Ana Mountains. A dam was built across this canyon, flooding it to create Upper Oso Reservoir, which now forms the headwaters of the creek, fed by three small seasonal streams. After leaving the reservoir, Oso Creek crosses under California State Route 241 and for the next mile (1.6 km) of its course, it flows through a narrow riparian corridor surrounded by residential areas in the city of Mission Viejo. The creek enters an underground culvert, bends east and south, and enters Lake Mission Viejo, 12 miles (19 km) from the mouth.

Downstream of the artificial lake, Oso Creek flows through a golf course, then after flowing through another narrow canyon, receives an unnamed tributary from the left, 10.5 miles (16.9 km) from the mouth. It then bends slightly to flow southwest and enters a culvert under Marguerite Parkway, emptying into another golf course, 8 miles (13 km) from the mouth. The creek then crosses under Interstate 5 and flows between the highway and Camino Capistrano through a series of freshwater marshes. The La Paz Channel, its largest tributary, joins here on the right. It passes the Galivan Basin, which functions to capture floodwaters from Oso Creek, on the right bank, and receives from the right a second unnamed tributary, 7.5 miles (12.1 km) from the mouth. This tributary actually flows through the Galivan Basin before meeting Oso Creek.

The creek then bends southwest around several shopping centers near the convergence of Interstate 5 and California State Route 73, within the city limits of Laguna Niguel. Near this area, Oso Creek enters a concrete flood control channel with sloping sides, 5 miles (8.0 km) from the mouth. It then flows through a riprap lined channel before entering a concrete box culvert, which runs south under the state route. The creek then spills out into a natural channel, 1.2 miles (1.9 km) from the mouth, which it has incised to depths of 50 feet (15 m) or more, as the interstate bends southeast. Flowing through an agricultural area, the creek bends east to join Trabuco Creek inside San Juan Capistrano.

== Watershed ==
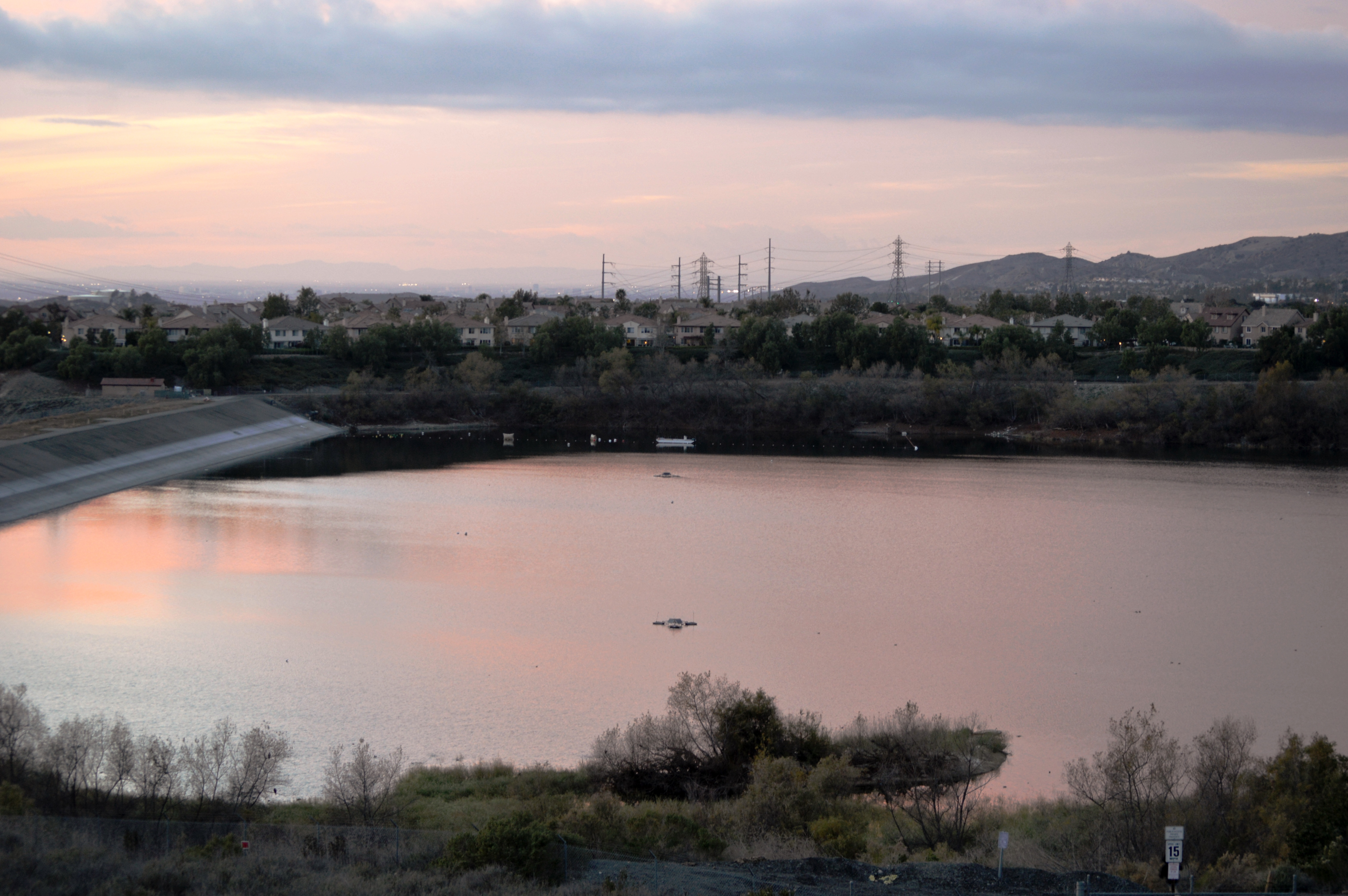
Upper Oso Creek Reservoir

Occupying the west and northwest portions of the San Juan Creek watershed, the 25-square-mile (65 km^{2}) Oso Creek watershed comprises about 18% of the 133-square-mile (340 km^{2}) San Juan Creek watershed. It includes parts of the cities of Mission Viejo, Laguna Niguel, and San Juan Capistrano. Most of the watershed is used for residential, commercial, and agricultural purposes. Oso Creek runs parallel to Trabuco Creek, while Salt Creek is to the southwest, Sulphur Creek to the west, and Aliso Creek to the northwest.

The southernmost portions of the San Joaquin Hills lie to the west and southwest of the Oso Creek watershed, and the Santa Ana Mountains border it to the north and northeast. The drainage divide between Oso Creek and the Aliso Creek watershed is quite pronounced, connecting the San Joaquin Hills to the Santa Ana Mountains in a northeasterly direction.

=== Pollution and floods ===
The creek was formerly ephemeral, but significant amounts of urban runoff that flow uncontrolled into the creek have created a perennial flow, known also as a "nuisance flow". This dry-season flow, which has an average minimum of 1 cubic foot per second (0.03 m^{3}/s), has created erosion problems in the few unlined reaches of the creek, as the creek is mostly channelized. A structure exists on Oso Creek that is designed to divert a portion of the flow into the Galivan Basin depending on the specific level of a high inflow. Amounts diverted include 350 cubic feet per second (10 m^{3}/s) during a flow of 4,000 cubic feet per second (110 m^{3}/s), and 4,800 cubic feet per second (140 m^{3}/s) during a flow of 29,000 cubic feet per second (820 m^{3}/s).

=== Erosion problems ===
In 1991, the continuing erosion along Oso Creek, due to upstream development, had carved a 50-foot (15 m) deep canyon from a creek channel that originally "was about 6 feet deep and 6 feet wide". The canyon was threatening to swallow large portions of citrus groves. It begins less than 1 mile (1.6 km) downstream of the Interstate 5/California State Route 73 interchange, where Oso Creek spills out of its concrete channel onto bare ground, and continues downstream to where the creek meets Trabuco Creek.

In early 1993, severe storm erosion damage along Oso Creek threatened sewer lines and a church. On 15 March 2000, 21,000 U.S. gallons (80 m^{3}) overflowed into Oso Creek from a broken sewage pipeline in Mission Viejo.

== Streamflow ==
The USGS operated one stream gauge for ten years from 1971 to 1981 near Mission Viejo, California, specifically near the Crown Valley Parkway crossing, approximately 5 miles (8.0 km) above the confluence with Trabuco Creek and in total 8 miles (13 km) above where the water joins San Juan. This gauge recorded an average annual flow of 5.3 cubic feet per second (0.15 m^{3}/s), or 3,800 acre⋅ft (4,700,000 m^{3}) per year, with most of the flow occurring between December and March. The highest peak flow was 5,150 cubic feet per second (146 m^{3}/s) on 16 February 1980, with a gauge height of 7.6 feet (2.3 m). The second highest flow was the preceding year, which saw a flow of 2,445 cubic feet per second (69.2 m^{3}/s).

== Recreation ==
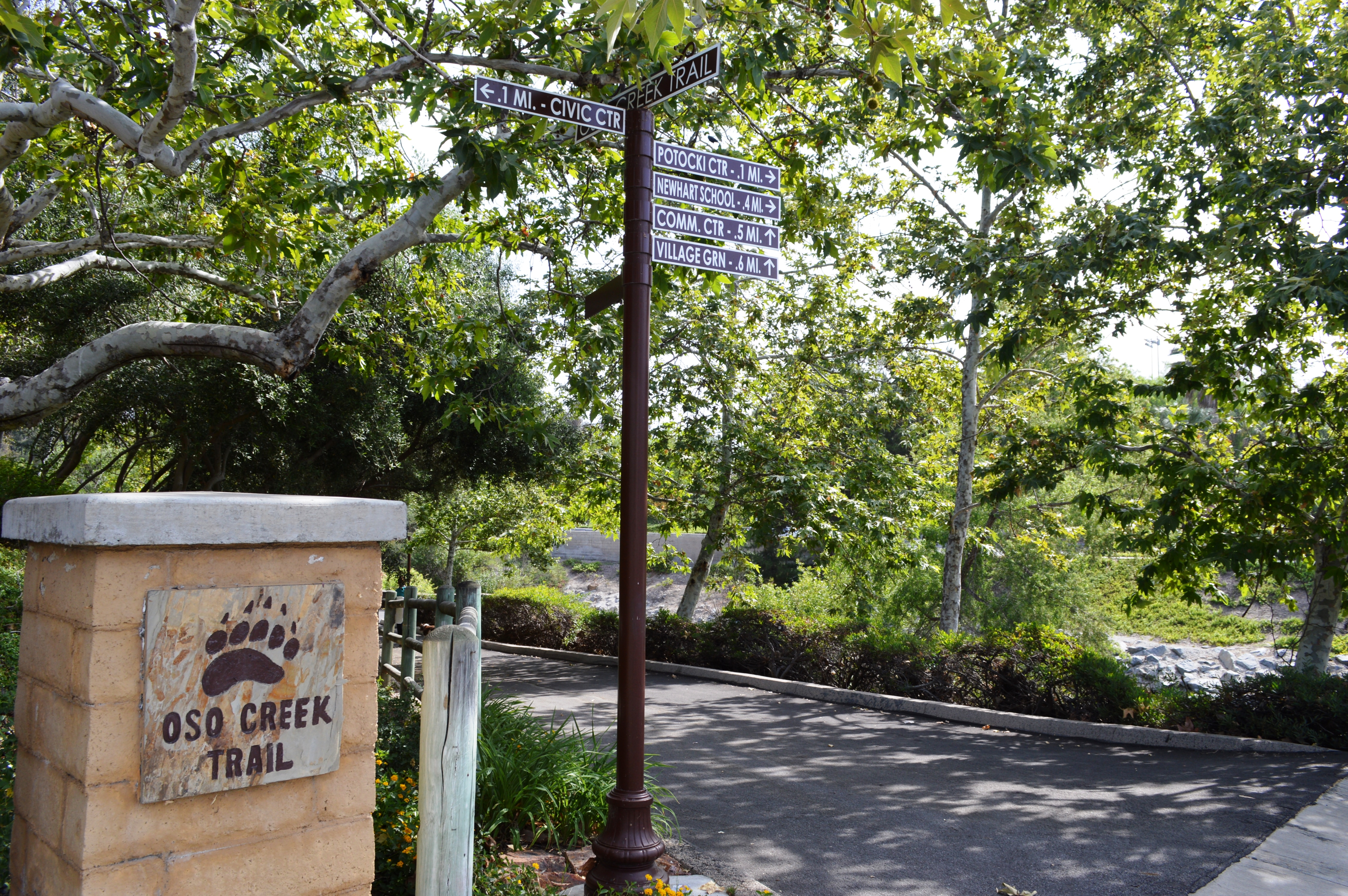
The Oso Creek Trail

The Oso Creek Trail follows the creek for a notable portion of its length, and is said to be the "backbone" of the trail system of the City of Mission Viejo. The paved trail mostly follows a fire road. The trail, however, does not extend to the creek's mouth, as the creek flows through privately owned farmland to its mouth.
