= Lake Mission Viejo =

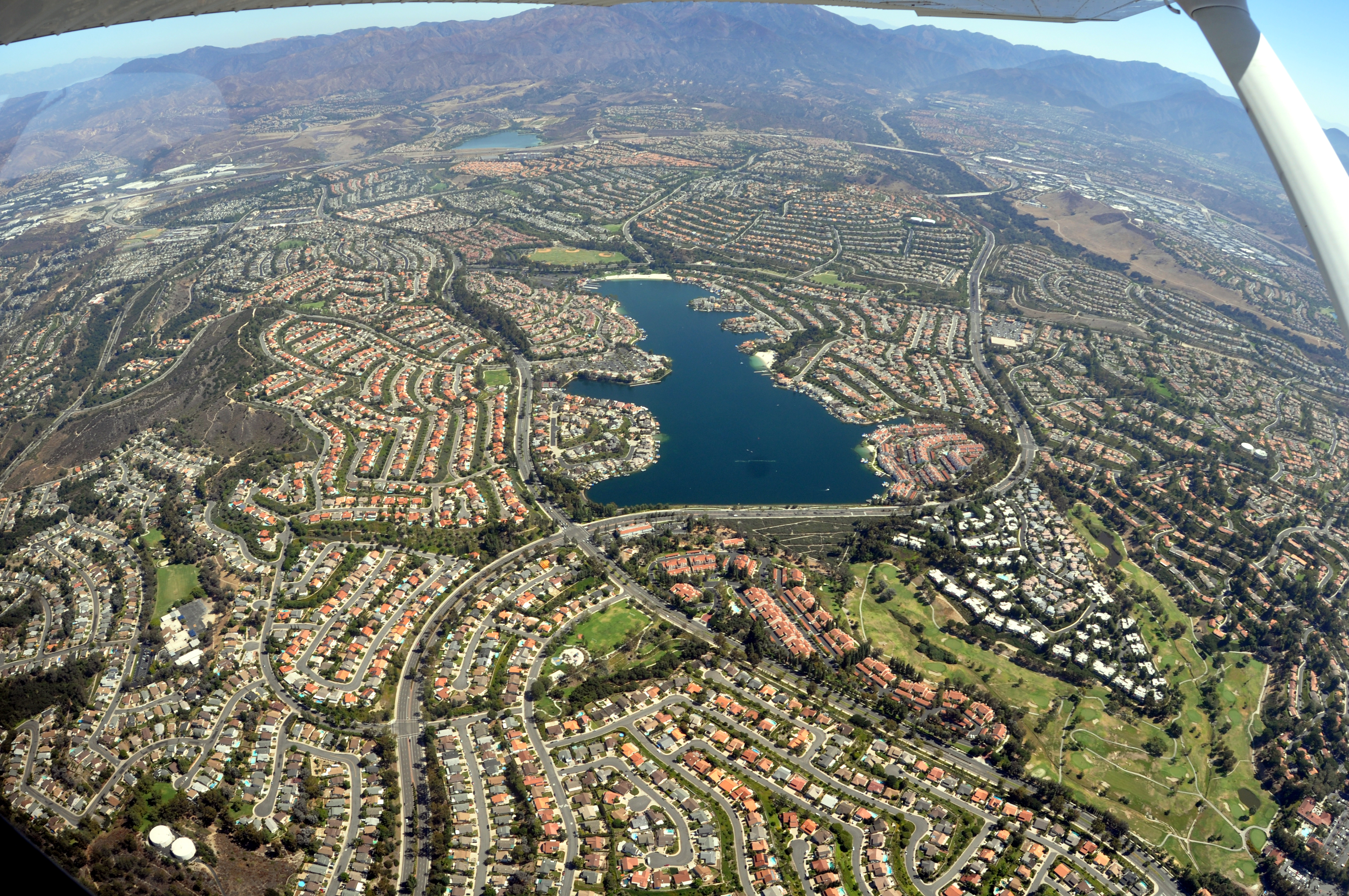
- aerial photograph (2010)

- Location within California Location within the United States
- Location: Mission Viejo, California
- Coordinates: 33°37′36″N 117°38′53″W
- Type: reservoir
- Basin countries: United States
- Built: 1975
- Max. length: 1 mi (1.6 km)
- Max. width: 1/4 mi (0.40 km)
- Surface area: 125 acres (51 ha)
- Average depth: 30 ft (9.1 m)
- Max. depth: 70 ft (21 m)
- Water volume: 1.2 billion US gallons (4.5 Gl)
- Shore length^{1}: 3.02 miles (4.86 km) of shoreline
- Surface elevation: 701 ft (214 m)
- ^{1} Shore length is not a well-defined measure.

Lake Mission Viejo is a reservoir created for recreation in Mission Viejo, Orange County, California, United States. The reservoir is formed by an earthfill dam across the canyon of Oso Creek, which is part of the Trabuco Creek and San Juan Creek drainage basin. The lake is not fed by urban runoff; it is maintained so as to be safe for contact. The Lake Association owns and operates the Lake facilities which include approximately 124 surface acres of water and 50 acres of land, including Playa del Norte (North Beach) and Marina, Playa del Este (East Beach), parking facilities, Market on the Lake Dock and dam. Recreational facilities available for lake association members include the lake, two large beaches and picnic areas, clubhouse rental, boat launching facility and shoreline fishing area.

The Lake Mission Viejo Association, is a California Non-Profit corporation consisting of those residential property owners within the ultimate boundaries of the Mission Viejo planned community. Association members have access to the lake through the guard gates at both North Beach and East Beach. Other portions of the shoreline have been developed as private residential projects and commercial village (Market on the Lake). Smaller private beach facilities around the lake are for the exclusive use of waterfront homeowners. Costs and operations of any private facilities for lakefront developments will be paid for and are the responsibility of that lakefront owner.

Other amenities include fishing, recreation (boating and swimming) as well as concerts, movie nights and summer camps during the summer months. Lake Mission Viejo is a private recreational facility / HOA that is for the use and enjoyment of members that own or live in lake member properties within the City of Mission Viejo.

About 5 miles (8.0 km) south of Santiago Peak, a peak in the Santa Ana Mountains, the lake is surrounded by private residential (single-family and condominium) communities, and is a private membership for Mission Viejo residents. The primary marina is located in the northwestern arm of the lake. Upstream of Lake Mission Viejo is Upper Oso Reservoir, which spills downstream and into Mission Viejo in wet years.

== Beaches ==
There are two main beaches, Playa del Norte and Playa del Este, with a few smaller, private beaches. The larger beaches are both protected by the Lake Mission Viejo lifeguards. Both beaches contain playgrounds, barbecues and picnic areas.

=== Playa del Norte (or North Beach) ===
More commonly referred to as North Beach, is the largest beach at Lake Mission Viejo. It contains the largest sandy beach area, volleyball courts, a full basketball court (in the winter months), and a clubhouse available to rent. All of the administration buildings are located at the North Beach. All boat rentals and boat launching is located at the North Beach. North Beach is open all year round. Snack Bar services are provided during the summer season as well as special menu for concert days and the Annual Jazz Fest/Taste of the Lake.

=== Playa del Este (or East Beach) ===
More commonly referred to as East Beach, Playa del Este is the second largest beach at Lake Mission Viejo. East beach also has picnic tables, barbeques, playground area, basketball courts and an upper picnic area overlooking the Lake which may be reserved for larger groups. East Beach is open daily during summer and on weekends from Memorial Day through Labor Day.

== Swimmer's Itch ==
During spring and parts of the summer, swimmer's itch, also called cercarial dermatitis can appear. It is a microscopic pest that lives on hosts like birds and snails by biting into their skin. Once it bites a human, it dies but leaves an irritated area or bump like a mosquito bite. The itching will be gone as well as the bump in a few days. Swimmer's itch can be prevented by showering thoroughly after swimming. There have been no reports of swimmer's itch at the Lake Mission Viejo since 2015.

== Boating ==
There is a rental fleet which includes rowboats, available with electric motors, 14’ Capri sailboats, pedal boats, kayaks, and party (pontoon) boats. All rental boats are available to Association members and their guests for a reasonable fee.

== Fishing ==
The Lake is stocked with different kinds of fish including trout, catfish, tilapia, bass and sunfish. Specially designed fish habitats have been built on the bottom of the lake to promote good fishing and spawning. In November 2014 an outbreak of Golden Algae decimated the LMVA fish populations, resulting in an unprecedented loss in fish stocks. Lake biologists were seen applying a chemical algae killer directly to the water in an effort to eradicate the Golden Algae, which seemed to not be effective. Since the die-off, unpopular tilapia were introduced and as of 2019, the Golden Algae issue hasn't been resolved. Subsequent stockings of trout have seen large volume die-offs over the years and no solution has been found. Lake Association members may fish at the designated shoreline area adjacent to the marina, or from a boat out on the lake. Association members receive identification badges for eligible family members. These badges entitle the member to free fishing privileges (guests must pay a fishing fee).

In order to protect the natural ecological balance of the Lake, only specified types of baits are permitted. Bait and other fishing equipment may be purchased at the Boat Rental Office. Fishing club information is also available at the Boat Rental office.

=== Records ===
On April 1, 2006 George Coniglio caught a 19 lbs 12 oz largemouth bass. As of 2006, it ranked 13th largest catch all-time nationwide. The fish measured 28 inches long with a 26-inch girth. Mr. Coniglio also set a new IGFA “All-Tackle Length” Largemouth Bass was caught in Lake Mission Viejo on May 15, 2015. The Bass was 65 cm. long, (2 feet 1½inches), 4 cm. longer than the previous record.

== History ==
Lake Mission Viejo construction cost was initially estimated around $10 million. Eyeing a possible 30 percent return on investment, the Philip Morris Co. bought the Mission Viejo Co. for $52 million in 1972. Under terms of the purchase agreement, the Mission Viejo Co. became a wholly owned subsidiary of Philip Morris but continued its role as Mission Viejo's master builder.

An earthen dam nearly 130 feet high and almost a mile long was built along what would become the southern end of the lake. The hole for Lake Mission Viejo was completed by 1976. In 1978, two years after efforts began to fill the lake, this finally was accomplished.

In March, 1977 the Mission Viejo Company dedicated Lake Mission Viejo to the Lake Association, a California Non-Profit corporation consisting of those residential property owners within the ultimate boundaries of the Mission Viejo planned community.

== See also ==
- List of lakes in California
