= Margarita Lookout =

Lookout point in San Diego County, California

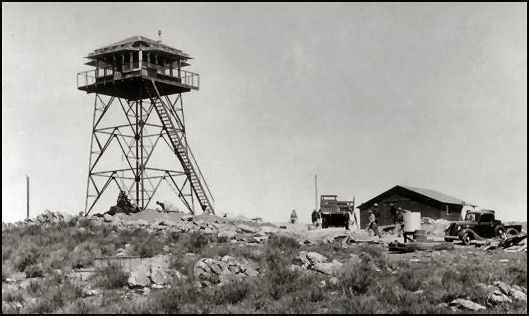
- Margarita Fire lookout tower as it appeared in 1935

Highest point
- Elevation: 3,087 ft (941 m)
- Coordinates: 33°16′00″N 117°13′48″W

Geography
- Location: San Diego County, California
- Parent range: Santa Margarita Mountains

Climbing
- Easiest route: Trail

Margarita Lookout, also known as Santa Margarita Lookout, is a lookout point in the Santa Margarita Mountains, part of the larger Santa Ana Mountains in San Diego County, California. The original fire lookout tower, built in 1935 by the CCC, was later replaced by a new lookout tower and cabin in 1965. In 1986, the tower and cabin were both burned in a wildfire. In 1988, the burnt tower was destroyed in a collision with a Marine Corps CH-46E helicopter. The lookout tower was badly damaged as a result and was promptly removed. Only a concrete foundation remains today, however the site is still accessible via trail (Margarita Road/Truck Trail). The lookout is approximately one mile north of Margarita Peak, and is located in the Cleveland National Forest.
