= Joplin Youth Center =

Juvenile center in Orange County, California

- Location of the facility within California
- Location: Santa Ana Mountains; 33°40′41″N 117°34′20″W
- Opened: 1956; 70 years ago
- Website: OC Gov page

The Joplin Youth Center is a male juvenile facility situated in the Santa Ana Mountains near the unincorporated community of Trabuco Canyon, California. The facility is operated by the Orange County Department of Probation and houses minors convicted of various crimes. The site features several buildings, a basketball court, a soccer field, and a pond down the hill from the main compound. Being in the Santa Ana Mountains, the facility is surrounded by natural chaparral, coastal sage scrub, and woodland environments. The facility is only accessible via Rose Canyon Road and a small dirt path that winds upward from Trabuco Creek Road. The Joplin Youth Center was founded in 1956 when Andrew B. Joplin, the namesake of the site, donated 320 acres of land to be used for juvenile detention services. The yearly budget of the detention center in 2008 was US$4,700,000.

On average, inmates stay at the facility for 30 to 90 days. Inmates wear color-coded shirts to indicate the amount of time spent at the facility as well as their behavior, thus correlating with what recreational privileges they may receive. Joplin Youth Center receives many detainees with gang ties and pays for the removal of gang-affiliated tattoos.

During the United States COVID-19 outbreak in 2020, the facility was vacated of juvenile inmates and was utilized as shelter for elderly homeless people of the county who did not show signs of infection.
