= Trabuco Peak =

Stream in the American state of California

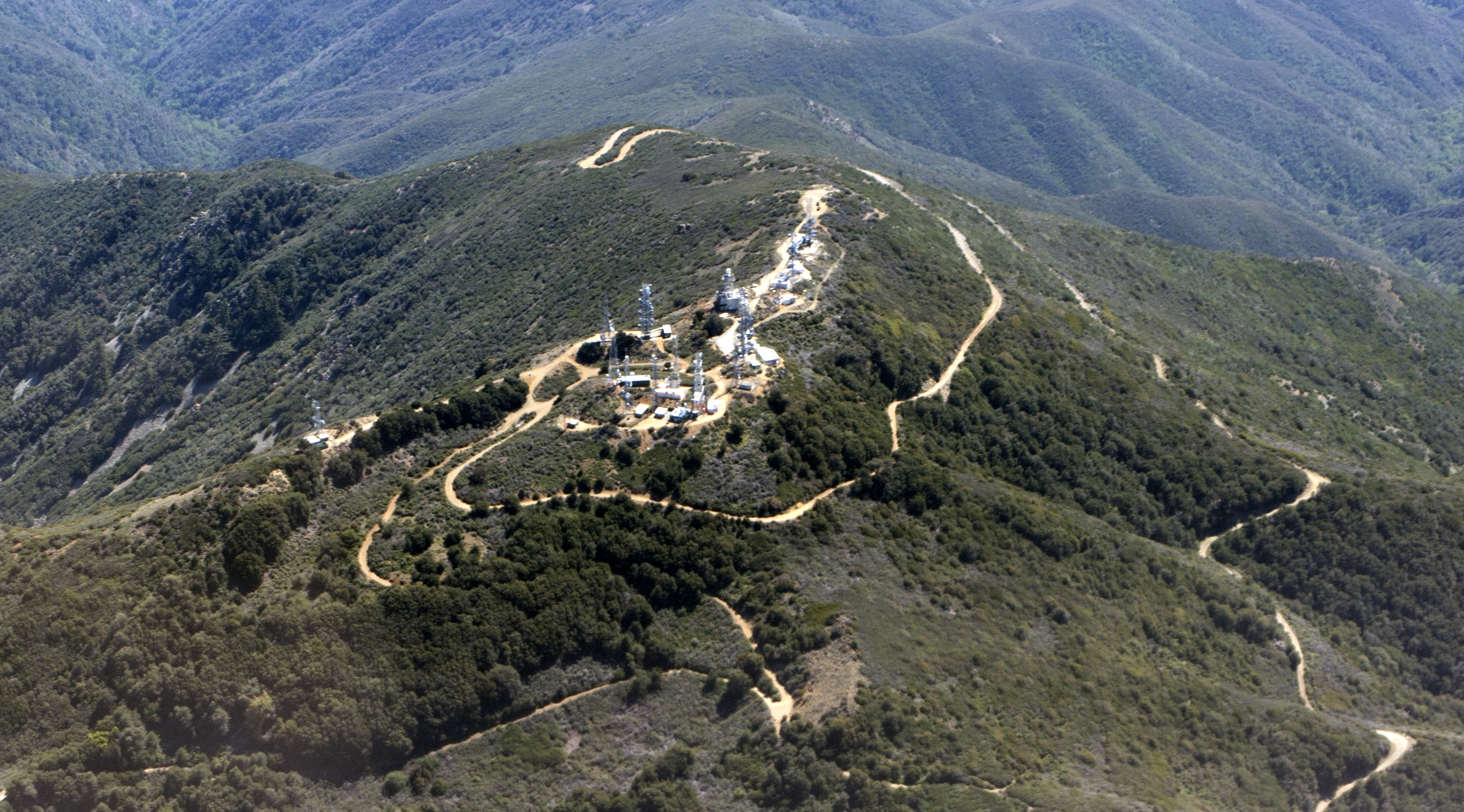
- Trabuco Peak

Highest point
- Elevation: 4,607 ft (1,404 m) NAVD 88
- Prominence: 817 ft (249 m)
- Parent peak: Santiago Peak
- Listing: Sierra Club Lower Peaks Section
- Coordinates: 33°42′08″N 117°28′30″W

Geography
- Location within California Location within the United States
- Location: Orange/Riverside Counties, California
- Parent range: Santa Ana Mountains
- Topo map: USGS Alberhill

Climbing
- Easiest route: Hike

Trabuco Peak is a 4,607-foot (1,404 m) summit in the Santa Ana Mountains on the border of Orange and Riverside Counties, California, about halfway between Rancho Santa Margarita and Lake Elsinore. The mountain sits on the divide between Arroyo Trabuco (Trabuco Canyon) on the west and the Temescal Creek valley on the east. Situated in the Cleveland National Forest, it is the highest summit in the Santa Anas south of Santiago Peak.

The main trails providing access to the peak, the West Horsethief and Holy Jim trails, both begin at the bottom of Trabuco Canyon. The Main Divide Road, a fire road, also passes close to the peak.
