= Holy Jim Volunteer Fire Department =

Firefighter group in Orange County, US

Holy Jim Fire Department
Operational area
- Country: United States
- State: California
- County: Orange
- Jurisdiction: Holy Jim Canyon, Cleveland National Forest
- Coordinates: 33°40′34″N 117°31′05″W

Agency overview
- Established: 1961
- Annual calls: 36
- Employees: 2-12
- Staffing: Volunteer Only
- Fire chief: Michael Milligan
- EMS level: BLS

Facilities and equipment
- Stations: 1
- Trucks: 1
- Squads: 1

The Holy Jim Volunteer Fire Department (HJVFD) is a group of firefighters in remote Holy Jim Canyon in the Cleveland National Forest in Orange County, California.

The chief of the department is elected to the position by members of the community and department. The members of the fire department are certified and trained in basic life support and fighting wildfires.

The department performs 2 to 3 rescues of lost hikers a year and maintains its own stationhouse, one fire engine, six 5,000 gallon water tanks, a mile of water lines in the canyon and maintains its own weather station gauge at the stationhouse.

Orange Coast featured a four-page article on the firefighters in October 2008.

The station house now has only one fire engine. The other engine, Gertrude, was donated to a museum.
