= Bell Canyon =

Bell Canyon Arroyo de las Campanas
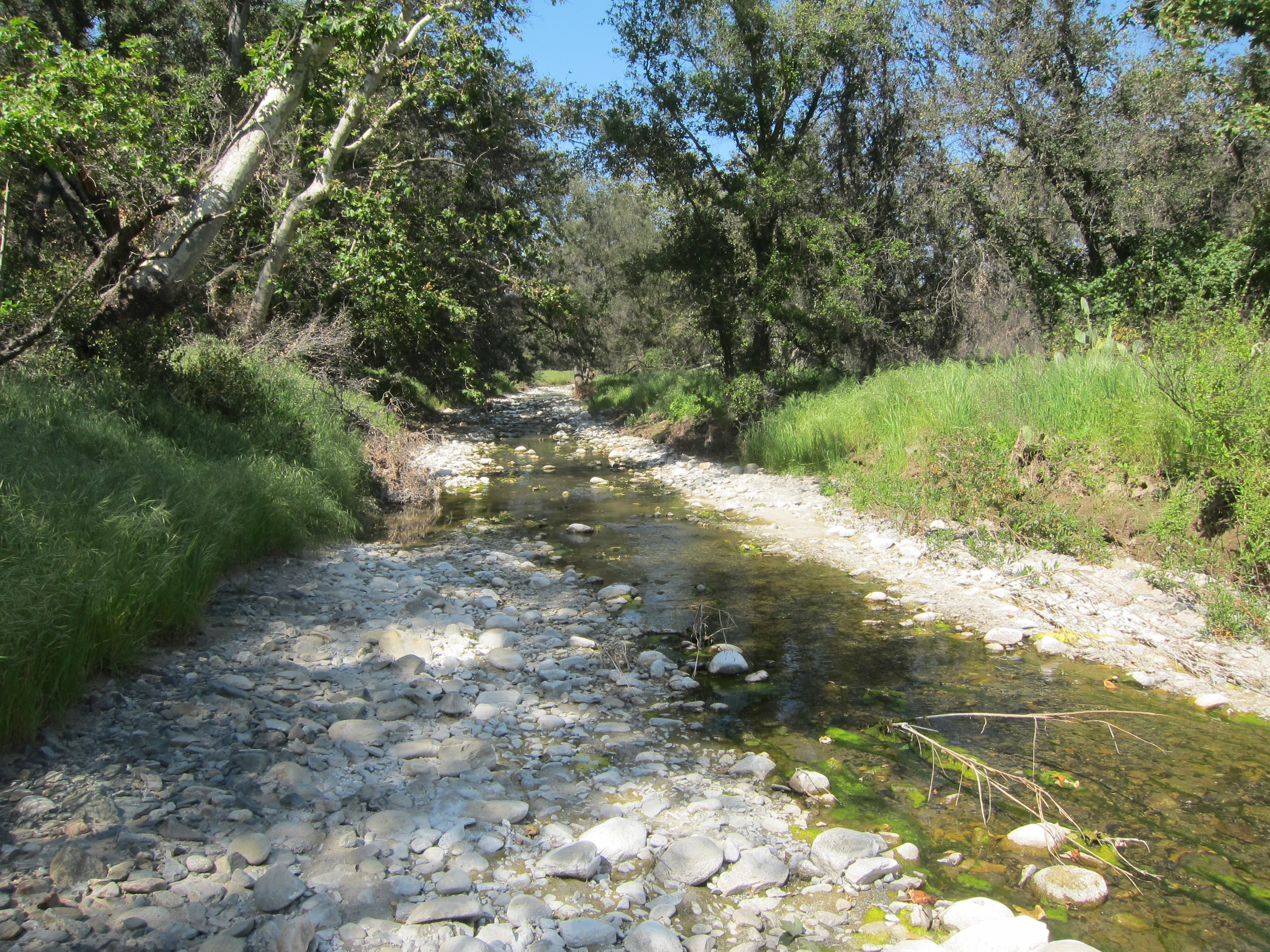
- Bell Creek at Caspers Wilderness Park

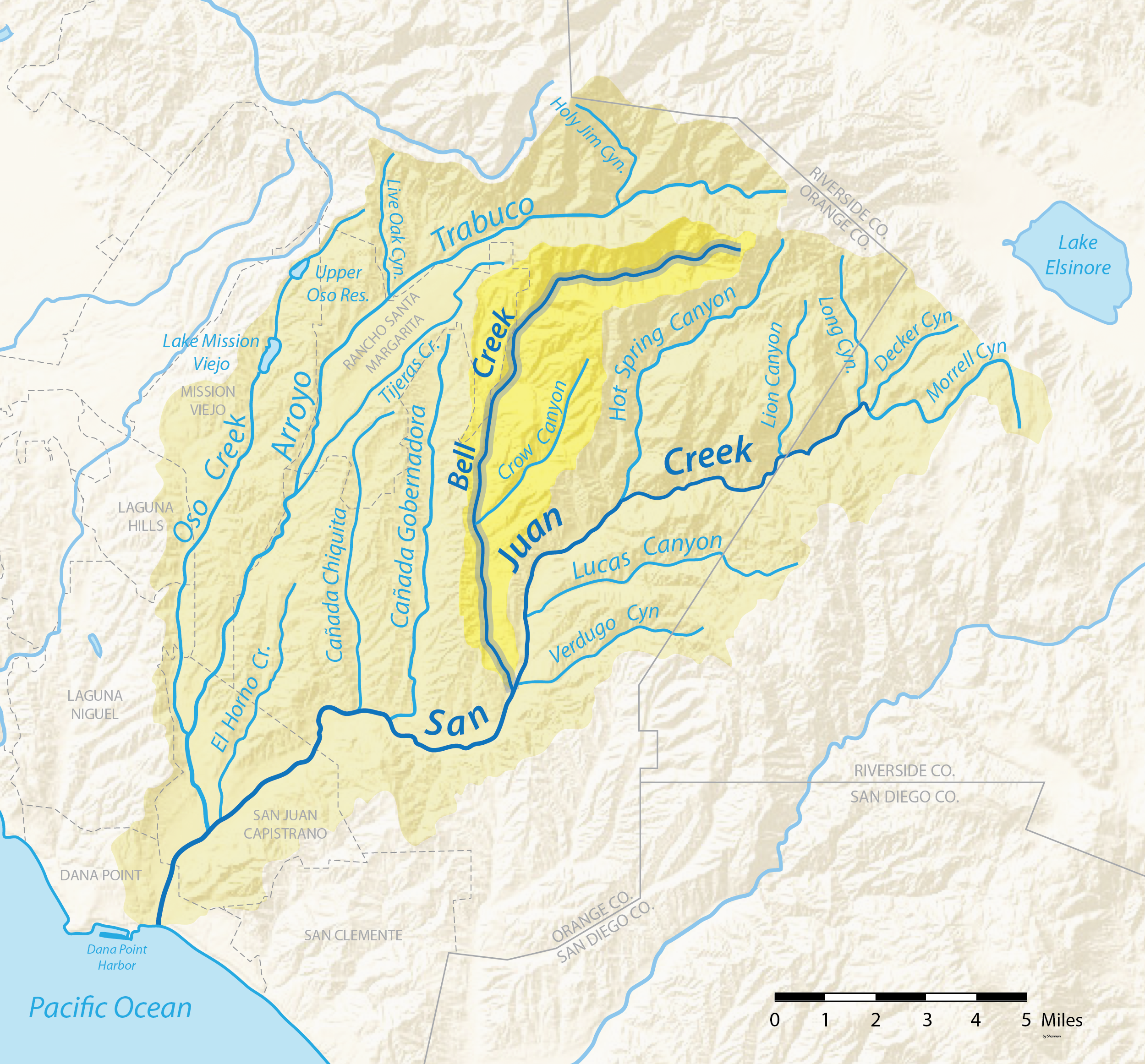
- Map of the San Juan Creek watershed with Bell Canyon sub-watershed highlighted
- Etymology: Acjachemen tradition

Location
- Country: USA
- State: California
- Region: Orange County

Physical characteristics
- Source: Bell Canyon, Santa Ana Mountains
  - coordinates: 33°39′51″N 117°28′22″W
  - elevation: 4,000 ft (1,200 m)
- Mouth: San Juan Creek, outside San Juan Capistrano
  - coordinates: 33°32′3″N 117°33′17″W
  - elevation: 113 ft (34 m)
- Length: 14.4 mi (23.2 km)
- Discharge
  - location: Right bank of San Juan Creek
  - minimum: 0 cu ft/s (0 m^{3}/s)

Basin features
- Tributaries
  - right: Tick Creek, Dove Creek

Bell Canyon is a major drainage of the Santa Ana Mountains in Orange County, California in the United States. Bell Creek (also known as Bell Canyon Creek or Arroyo de las Campanas) flows about 14.4 miles (23.2 km) in a southerly direction to its confluence with San Juan Creek. The Bell Canyon drainage is located to the east and parallel to Cañada Gobernadora, and to the south of Trabuco Creek. After Trabuco Creek, it is the second largest tributary of San Juan Creek in terms of length and its watershed area of 26 square miles (67 km^{2}).

Most of Bell Canyon consists of wilderness in the Cleveland National Forest and Ronald W. Caspers Wilderness Park. The valley is more than 1,000 feet (300 m) deep and averages a mile (1.61 km) wide, and is joined by the major tributaries of Dove Canyon, Crow Canyon and Tick Creek.

== Human history ==
The Juaneño or Acagchemem Native Americans have lived in the Bell Canyon area for almost 10,000 years, from archeology at the San Dieguito complex. It is said they would strike rocks against boulders in the canyon, producing a ringing sound that gave the canyon its name. The Native Americans, part of the Acjachemen Nation, found their way of life disrupted when Spanish colonizers and missionaries came to this area of Las Californias Province and established the Mission San Juan Capistrano in 1776 at nearby present day San Juan Capistrano, about 10 miles (16 km) from the creek's mouth.

In 1841, during secularization, Pío Pico and Andrés Pico were granted 89,742-acre (363.17 km2) 'Rancho San Onofre y Santa Margarita' next to the Mission San Juan Capistrano by the Mexican Governor of Alta California, Juan Alvarado. Three years later, the grant of Rancho Las Flores was added, and the grant renamed Rancho Santa Margarita y Las Flores which included Bell Canyon and Creek. Much of Bell Canyon was purchased by Eugene Grant Starr in the late 1920s, creating a large parcel of undeveloped land that became the National Audubon Society's 'Starr Ranch' in 1973.

A wide and braided watercourse flowing through an alluvial valley, Bell Canyon Creek remains much like its original state before the Spanish arrival, although with the development of Coto de Caza and nearby communities it has seen increased urban runoff, which does not often reach San Juan Creek in the form of surface water, but contaminates the local groundwater. Work was begun in 2005 to remove polluted water from two Bell Canyon tributaries that flow through residential areas on the west side of the watershed. Several pumps were installed on Dove and Tick Creeks in 2005 to remove excess surface water flow and feed the urban runoff into a reclaimed-water system. This provides extra water for residential irrigation and reduces the runoff which previously enabled non-native invasive species (invasive exotics) of plants to grow, at the expense of native riparian habitat.

== Drainage ==
The headwaters of Bell Creek are a fan-shaped network of canyons eroded into the west side of 4,510 ft (1,370 m) Los Pinos Peak, which lie just a few miles south of the Trabuco Creek headwaters and a few miles north of Hot Spring Canyon, also a tributary of San Juan Creek. The headwaters are in the Trabuco Ranger District of the Cleveland National Forest, about 8 miles (13 km) east of Rancho Santa Margarita. Bell Creek flows through a 1.5-mile (2.4 km)-wide, 1,200-foot (370 m)-deep canyon for 4 miles (6.4 km) before turning southwest for about 1.5 miles (2.4 km). Narrowly following the city limits of Rancho Santa Margarita which lies to the west, Bell Creek receives an unnamed tributary from the right at river mile (RM) 10, or river kilometer (RK) 16.1, carrying a small amount of runoff from a residential area on the east side of the city. Bell Creek then turns southwards and Fox Creek, a slightly larger tributary, enters from the left at RM 9.2 (RK 14.8).

Dove Canyon, the largest tributary of Bell Canyon Creek, draining a 3-mile (4.8 km)-long strip of land that includes residential areas and a golf course, enters from the right at RM 9 (RK 14.5) and Tick Creek enters in quick succession at RM 8.9 (RK 14.3). The creek then trends southwards through a widening and shallowing valley for some 4 miles (6.4 km) before Crow Canyon enters from the left at RM 4.5 (RK 7.2). By this time Bell Canyon is a wide, meandering braided stream whose flow is mostly subsurface. When the creek reaches San Juan Creek,7.5 miles (12.1 km) east of the city of San Juan Capistrano, it joins on the right bank, directly before Verdugo Canyon Creek enters the larger stream on the left bank. Below the confluence with Bell Canyon, San Juan Creek flows 14.7 miles (23.7 km) further before emptying into the Pacific Ocean at Dana Point.

The Bell Canyon Creek watershed consists of an L-shaped area in southern Orange County near the boundary of Riverside County and San Diego County. It is about 10 miles (16 km) long as the crow flies and about 2 miles (3.2 km) wide at its broadest. Nearly the entire watershed consists of the continuous Bell Canyon valley that ranges from 2,600 feet (790 m) deep near the headwaters to just 300 feet (91 m) deep near the mouth. It covers about 26 square miles (67 km^{2}), or about 19.42% of the 133.9-square-mile (347 km^{2}) San Juan Creek watershed as a whole.

After the 22-mile (35 km) Trabuco Creek, Bell Canyon Creek is also the second largest tributary within the watershed by terms of length and drainage area. The whole Bell Canyon Creek watershed is enveloped by different drainage areas within the San Juan Creek watershed. On the southeast side are Cold Springs and Hot Springs Creek, tributaries of San Juan Creek above Bell Canyon Creek; on the northwest, Trabuco Creek, on the west, Cañada Gobernadora. Most of the Bell Canyon drainage area lies within the Cleveland National Forest in the upper half and the Ronald W. Caspers Regional Park (often abbreviated to Caspers Regional Park or Caspers Park) in the lower half. Dove Canyon, however, is on residential land in the city of Rancho Santa Margarita.

== Geology ==
The upper canyon, in the Santa Ana Mountains, is carved into Jurassic-age igneous and metamorphic rock overlain by a few thousand feet of highly erosive Cretaceous-age sedimentary rock covered by thin layers of rocky soil. The mountains began rising during the late Miocene epoch, beginning about 5.5 million years ago. The valley floor of the upper Bell Canyon area is underlain by the Bedford Canyon Formation, which is composed of siltstone, argillite, conglomerate, limestone, slate and greywacke. Two minor faults cross Bell Creek within 4.8 miles (7.7 km) of each other: the Aliso Fault and Mission Viejo Fault, upstream of the Dove Canyon confluence.

The alluvial floodplain that lines much of the lower canyon today is largely a result of the Wisconsinian glaciation, which forced sea level worldwide to drop up to 400 feet (120 m) from their previous level in the Sangamonian Stage. This coincided with a massive North American climate change that shifted the cold, rainy climate of the Pacific Northwest further south to Southern California. Rainfall exceeding 80 inches (200 cm) per year changed the slow-moving streams of the South Coast to powerful rivers that eroded deep channels into their floodplains to maintain equilibrium with the dropping sea level. The Wisconsinian era lasted from 70,000 to 10,000 years ago, and by the end of that period, climate changed to its present state and Southern California rivers reverted to small seasonal streams. The end of the Wisconsinian also marked the rise of sea level about 300 feet (91 m) to its present-day level. The canyons carved by the rivers became long narrow inlets which gradually filled with sediments, but the difference in sea level between the pre-Wisconsinian and post-Wisconsinian was responsible for the formation of river terraces along most streams with a floodplain.

=== Hydrology ===
The Bell Canyon Creek watershed has three distinct areas with different levels of groundwater percolation. On mountainous slopes, which comprise about 65% of the watershed, the percolation rate is relatively low and produces a moderate amount of runoff during storms. On the deep alluvium of the valley floors, however, water soaks into the ground and flows subsurface into San Juan Creek. This area is the site of a thick riparian zone and produces little storm runoff. The third area is the residential areas of Dove Canyon and Tick Creek, in which 90% of the surface water flows into the streams as runoff, and during storms, runoff peaks sharply and diminishes rapidly. This source of urban runoff is a continuing problem for the Bell Canyon watershed.

== Flora and fauna ==
The broad alluvial floodplain of Bell Canyon Creek has historically supported and still supports a riparian woodland and understory that extends from canyon wall to canyon wall. This riparian area consists of plentiful undergrowth bordering and near the stream, and many trees including the California Sycamore (Platanus racemosa), Fremont Cottonwood (Populus fremontii), and Coast live oak (Quercus agrifolia). However, non-native invasive species of plants carried into lower Bell Canyon Creek from its tributaries, such as Periwinkle (Vinca major) and Ivy (Hedera spp.), are replacing the California native plant subshrubs, bunchgrasses, perennials, bulbs, annuals, and groundcovers.

== See also ==
- List of rivers of Orange County, California

== Works cited ==
- "San Juan Creek Watershed Management Study: Feasibility Phase" (PDF). U.S. Army Corps of Engineers. Watershed and Coastal Resources Division of Orange County. August 2002. Archived from the original (PDF) on 2006-03-13.
