= Santa Margarita Mountains =

Mountain range in California, United States

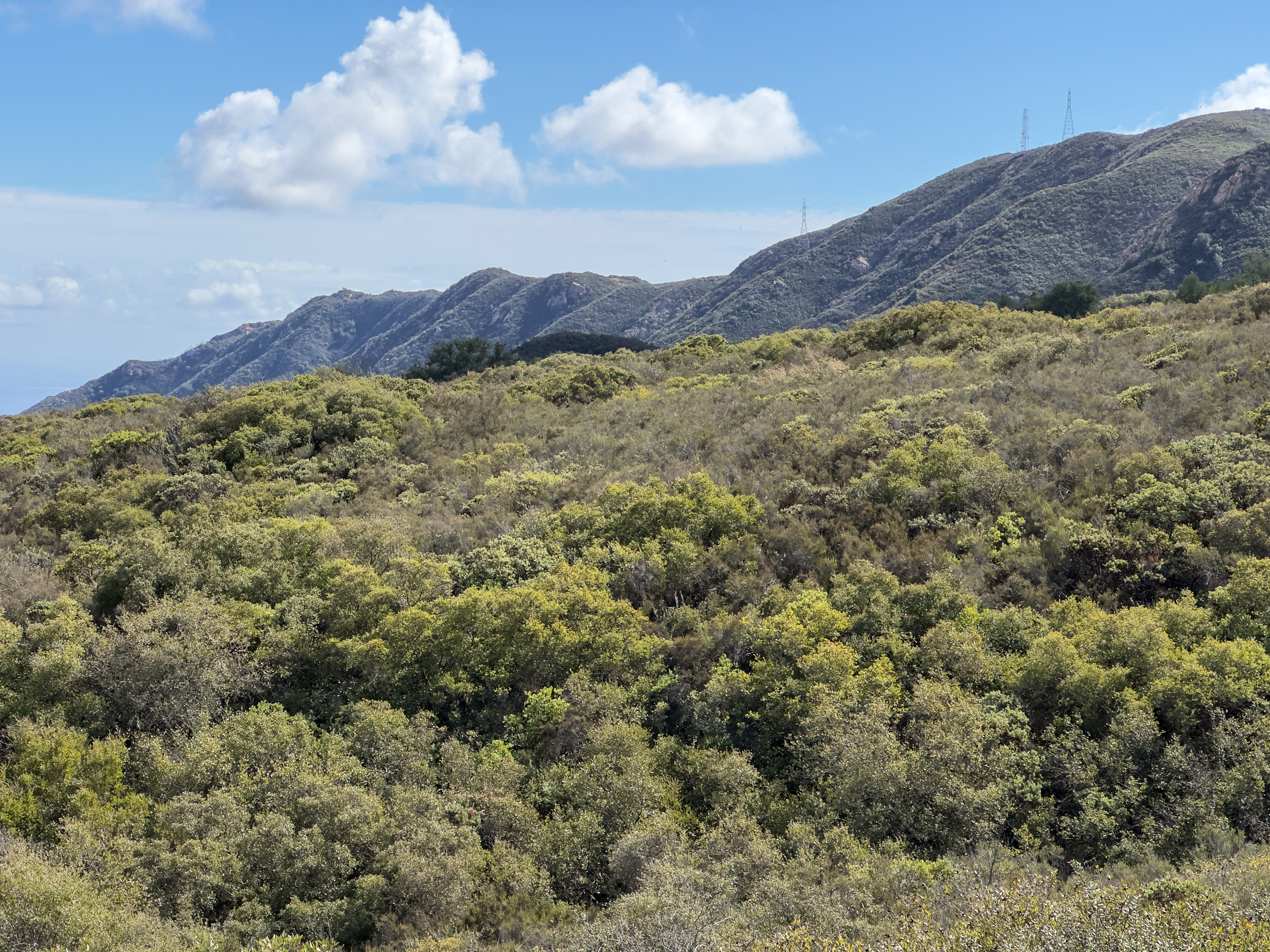
- A southwest facing view of the Santa Margarita Mountains

Highest point
- Elevation: 956 m (3,136 ft)
- Coordinates: 33°26′39″N 117°23′25″W

Geography
- Location within California
- Country: United States
- State: California
- District: San Diego County
- Range coordinates: 33°28′21.096″N 117°23′48.146″W
- Topo map: USGS Margarita Peak

The Santa Margarita Mountains are a mountain range, part of the larger Santa Ana Mountains in the Peninsular Ranges System. They are located in the coastal North County region of San Diego County, California.

They are bounded on the northwest by San Mateo Creek, on the northeast by Teneja Canyon Creek, on the east by De Luz Creek and on the south by Las Pulgas Canyon. On the southwest they descend into the coastal foothills in the Marine Corps Base Camp Pendleton.

The range's highest summit is Margarita Peak, at an elevation of 3136 feet. Margarita Lookout lies in the northern part of the subrange.
