= Margarita Peak =

Stream in the American state of California

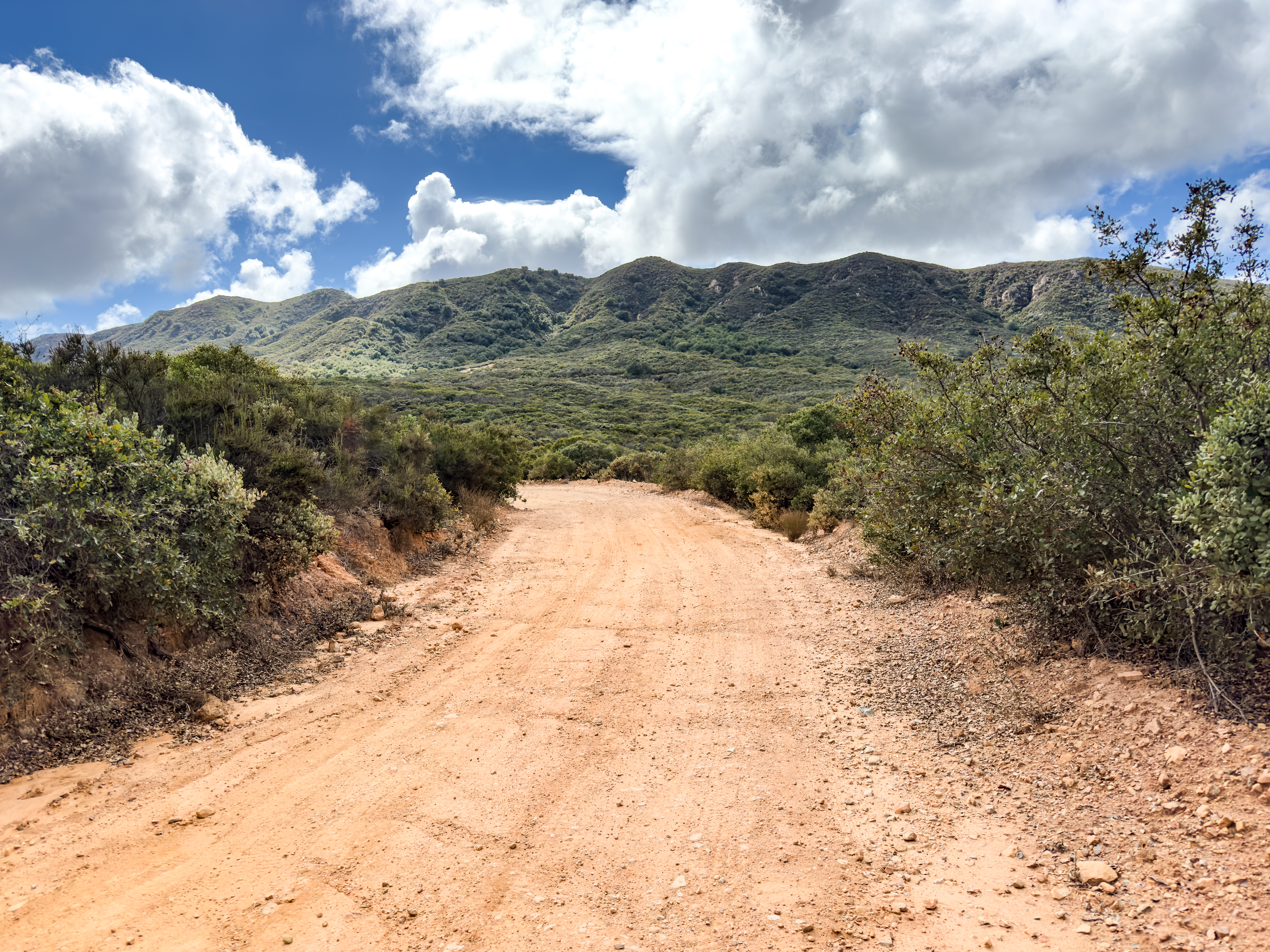
- View of Margarita Peak looking west

Highest point
- Elevation: 3,193 ft (973 m) NAVD 88
- Prominence: 1,029 ft (314 m)
- Coordinates: 33°26′40″N 117°23′26″W

Geography
- Location: San Diego County, California
- Parent range: Santa Margarita Mountains
- Topo map: USGS Margarita Peak

Margarita Peak is a prominent mountain in San Diego County. It is 9 miles (14 km) southwest of Murrieta Hot Springs and 9 miles (14 km) northwest of Fallbrook. Its 3,193-foot (973 m) summit is the 32nd most prominent peak in San Diego County. Margarita Peak is owned by the Fallbrook Land Conservancy, which has closed public access to the peak and the surrounding Margarita Peak Preserve for biological studies and sensitive habitat. The trail to the peak was relatively little-used and not known by many people. It was considered one of San Diego's greatest hidden gems, due to the breathtaking 360-degree panorama views at the top. The main trail began on Margarita Road after the end of Tenaja Road 13 miles (21 km) southwest of I-15 and led to nearby Margarita Lookout. Persons attempting to reach the peak had to use a steep, poorly maintained firebreak that connected to the main trail. The hike to the top was 3 miles (4.8 km) each way.
