= Los Pinos Peak =

Stream in the American state of California

- Location within California Location within the United States

Highest point
- Elevation: 4,513 ft (1,376 m) NAVD 88
- Prominence: 610 ft (190 m)
- Coordinates: 33°39′51″N 117°28′16″W

Geography
- Location: Orange County, California, U.S.
- Parent range: Santa Ana Mountains
- Topo map: USGS Alberhill

Climbing
- Easiest route: Hike

Los Pinos Peak is a 4,455-foot (1,358 m) summit in the Santa Ana Mountains in Orange County, California, about 8 miles (13 km) east of Rancho Santa Margarita. Los Pinos is the southernmost peak above 4,000 feet (1,200 m) in the Santa Anas, and provides extensive views south towards San Diego and the Pacific Ocean as well as views (on clear days) of the San Jacinto Mountains and San Bernardino Mountains in the east. The summit rises rather prominently above the main crest of the Santa Anas and is conspicuously visible from much of southern Orange County, although its actual topographic prominence is only about 610 feet (186 m).

The peak is situated in the Cleveland National Forest and is accessible by the Main Divide Road (a fire road); the Trabuco Canyon Trail, which begins near Trabuco Creek, and the Los Pinos Peak Trail, which begins in Hot Springs Canyon (near San Juan Canyon, San Juan Creek and the Ortega Highway (State Route 74).
