= O'Neill Regional Park =

Park in Orange County, United States

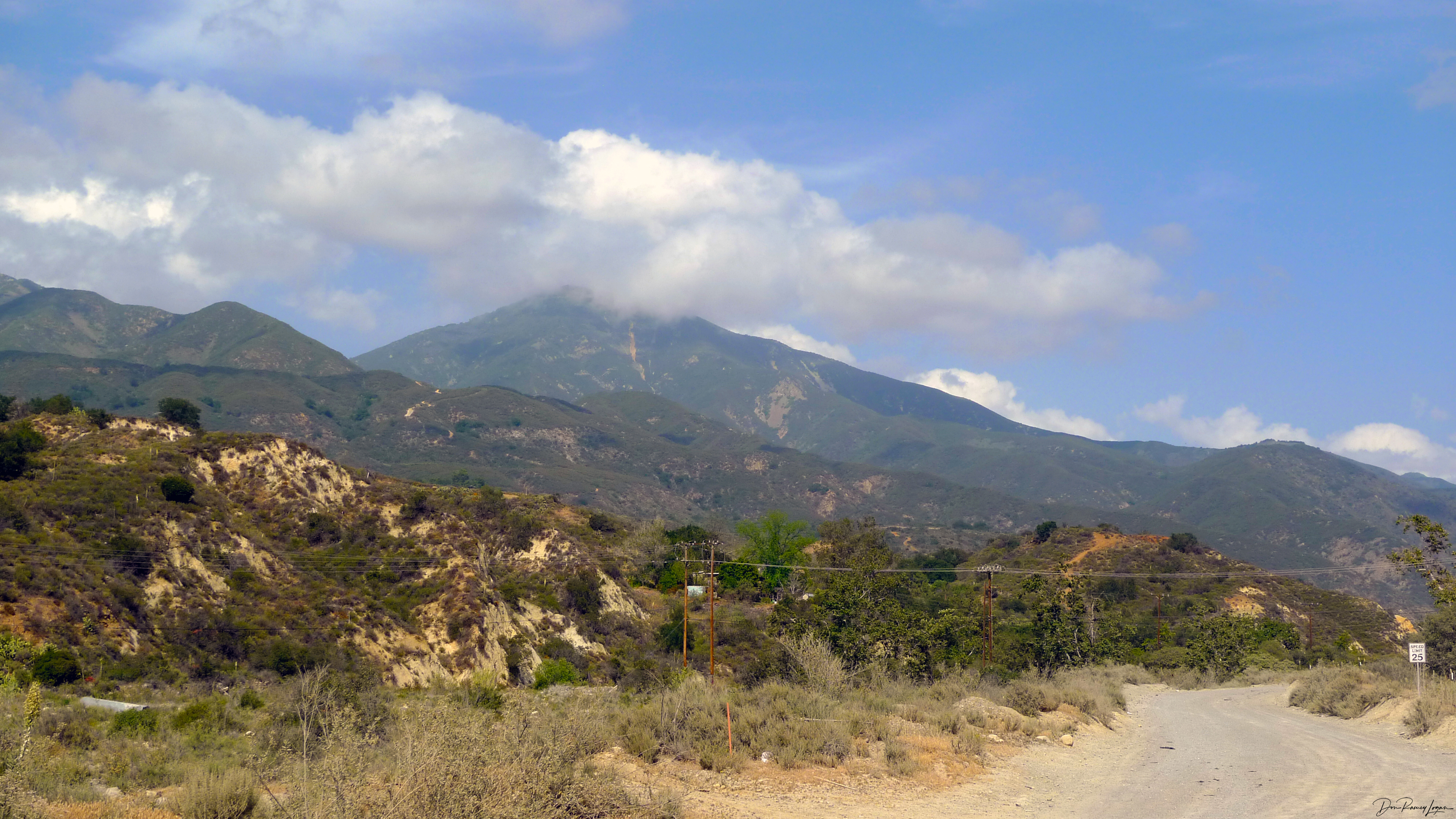
- Interactive map of O'Neill Regional Park
- Type: Regional park
- Location: Orange County, California
- Nearest city: Rancho Santa Margarita
- Coordinates: 33°39′06″N 117°36′01″W
- Area: 4,500 acres (1,800 ha)
- Created: 1948
- Operator: OC Parks

O'Neill Regional Park is a major regional park and greenway in eastern Orange County, California, United States, located along Trabuco Creek and Live Oak Canyon. The park encompasses 4,500 acres (1,800 ha) of canyon and riparian zone habitat, and includes campgrounds and trails for hiking, biking and horseback riding.

The park was first established in 1948 when the owners of the O'Neill Ranch donated 278 acres (113 ha) of land for recreation purposes. Numerous land acquisitions between 1948 and 1982 brought the park to its present size. Many flora and fauna can be sighted, such as poison oak, bobcats and mountain lions, which are very rare. The Acjachemen village site of Alume is located within the park's area.

== Geography ==
The long, narrow park is located in the foothills of the Santa Ana Mountains and includes about 7.5 miles (12.1 km) of Trabuco Creek (Arroyo Trabuco), a major seasonal stream and tributary of San Juan Creek. The park also includes the western half of Live Oak Canyon, which is drained by Hickey Creek. The creeks usually contain water in winter and early spring. The valley areas contain native coast live oak and sycamore forests as well as meadows. The hillsides are covered in cactus, wild buckwheat, sagebrush, chaparral, scrub oak, buckthorn and mountain mahogany. The area experiences a Mediterranean climate with cool, wet winters and hot, dry summers.

Caution is advised as the park is home to mountain lions and rattlesnakes.

== Facilities ==
The park includes about 23 miles (37 km) of trails, which are used by hikers, mountain bikers and equestrians. There are day-use picnic and barbecue areas throughout the park. The Arroyo Campground is located off Live Oak Canyon Road and includes 79 campsites, including eight large group campsites and five horse camping sites. A school can be found near the campsites, where children actually attend every day. The school has a room full of taxidermies of the local fauna, a farm, and an entrance to O’Neill.

== See also ==
- Cleveland National Forest
