= Santiago Peak =

Mountain in California, USA

- Kalawpa, Mount Downey, Old Saddle Buck, Old Saddleback, Saddleback Mountain, San Juan Mountain, Santa Ana Peak, Temescal Peak, Trabuco Peak
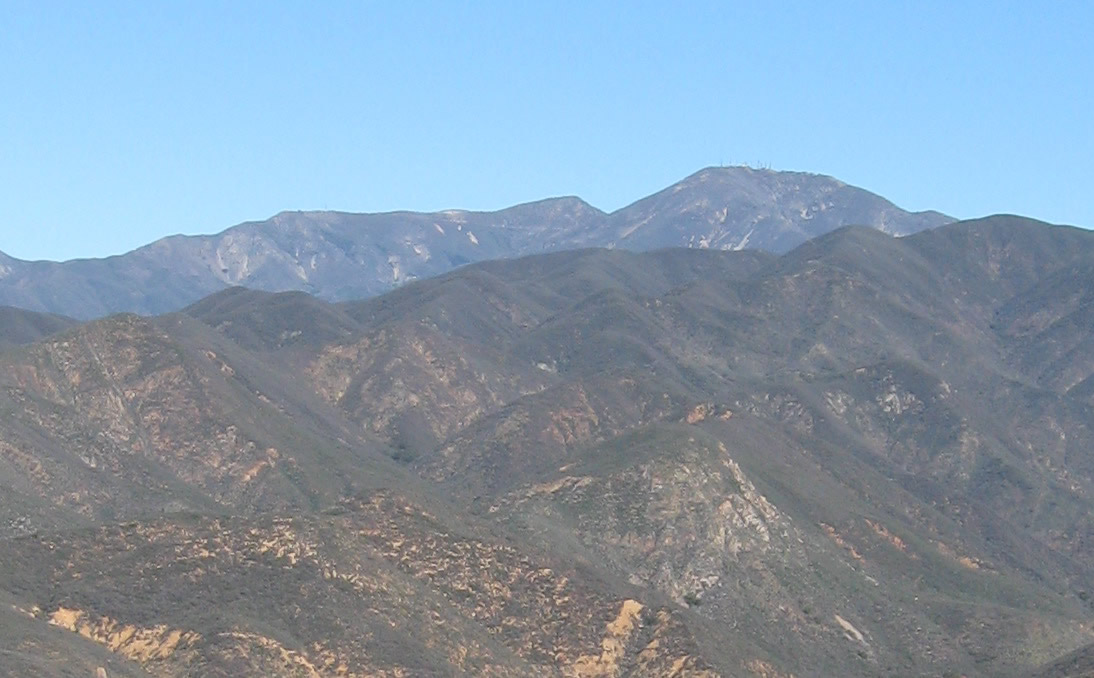
- The southern slopes of Santiago Peak, as seen from above San Juan Canyon (February 2008)

Highest point
- Elevation: 5,689 ft (1,734 m) NAVD 88
- Prominence: 4,387 ft (1,337 m)
- Listing: California county high points 37th
- Coordinates: 33°42′38″N 117°32′03″W

Naming
- English translation: Saint James
- Language of name: Spanish

Geography
- Location within the Los Angeles metropolitan area Location within California Location within the United States
- Location: Cleveland National Forest, Orange / Riverside counties, California, U.S.
- Parent range: Santa Ana Mountains
- Topo map: USGS Santiago Peak

Climbing
- Easiest route: Hiking trail

Santiago Peak is the southern mountain of the Saddleback landform in the Cleveland National Forest, located on the border of Orange County and Riverside County, California, United States. It is the highest and most prominent peak of both the Santa Ana Mountains and Orange County. The peak is named for Santiago Creek, which begins on its southwestern slope. During most winters, snow falls at least once on the peak. A telecommunication antenna farm with microwave antennas sits atop the peak.

The Acjachemen refer to the peak as Kalawpa, with the nearby village of Alume meaning "to raise the head in looking upward," in reference to the mountain.

== Hiking ==
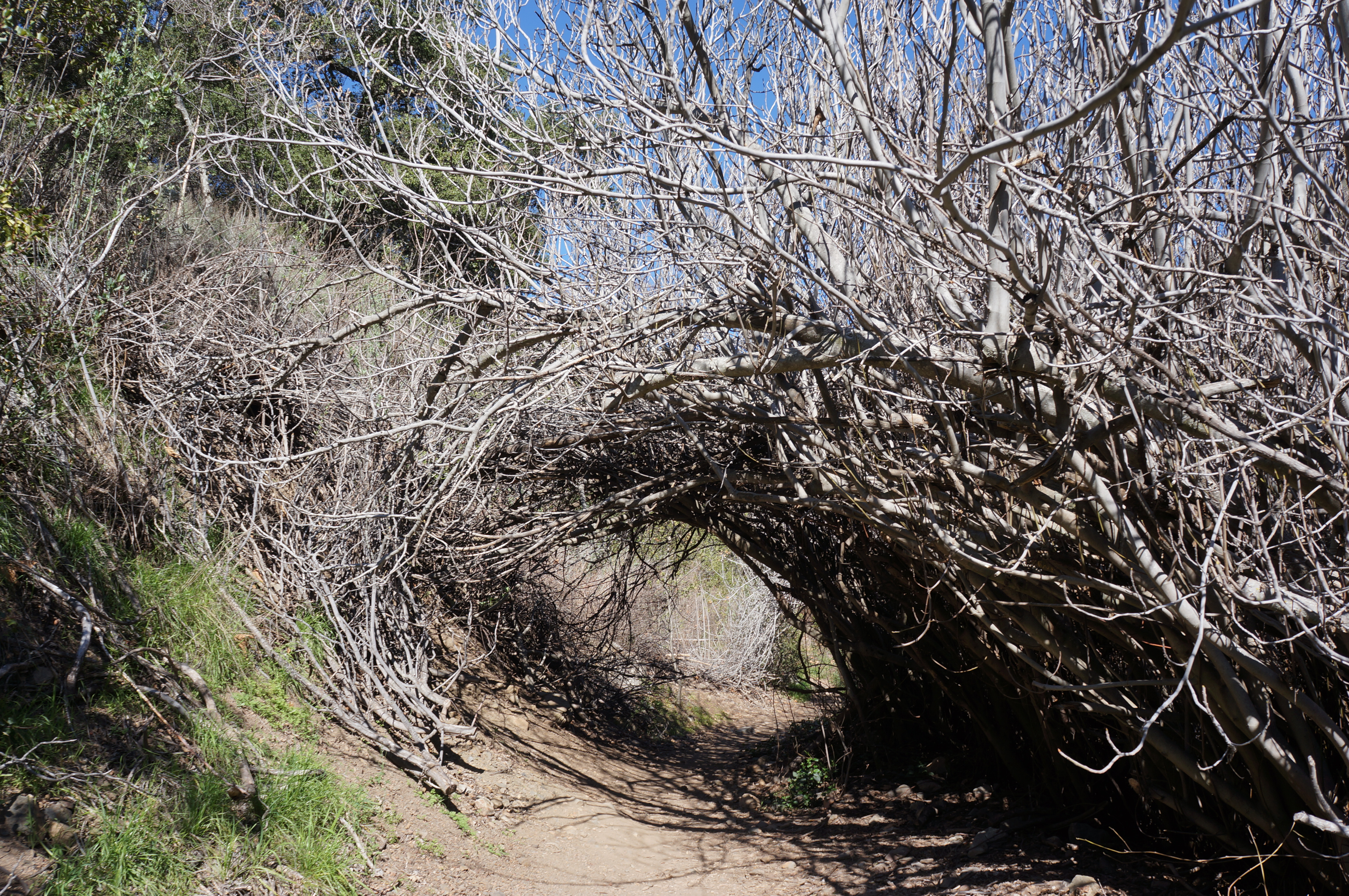
The trail to Holy Jim Falls (February 2013)

More than one trail leads to the top of Santiago Peak, but the most popular among hikers is the Holy Jim trail. The Holy Jim trail gains about 4,000 feet (1,200 m) in elevation and is a 16-mile (26 km) round trip. It is a moderate to strenuous hike and is most enjoyable during spring and winter due to the large number of insects during warmer times of the year.

From the summit of Santiago Peak, one can see the larger Southern California peaks like San Gorgonio Mountain, San Jacinto Peak, and Mount San Antonio. However, due to the large number of antennas at the top of Santiago Peak, a full 360-degree view of the surrounding landscapes is not possible. Those at the top must walk approximately a quarter-mile around the perimeter of all the antennas to take in views of every direction.

== Radio communication facilities ==
Santiago Peak is a radio site with buildings owned by American Tower, Crown Castle, MobileRelay Associates, Day Wireless, Orange County Communications, the United States Federal Government, the State of California, and Southern California Edison, among others.

Santiago Peak provides radio coverage over much of Los Angeles, Orange, San Bernardino, Riverside, and San Diego counties. It houses both broadcast and two-way communications facilities on virtually every frequency band, including FM broadcast, VHF low- and high-band, UHF, 800/900 MHz, and microwave.

In September 2024, the Airport Fire, which originated in Trabuco Canyon, burned to Santiago Peak and damaged parts of the radio infrastructure.

== Gallery ==
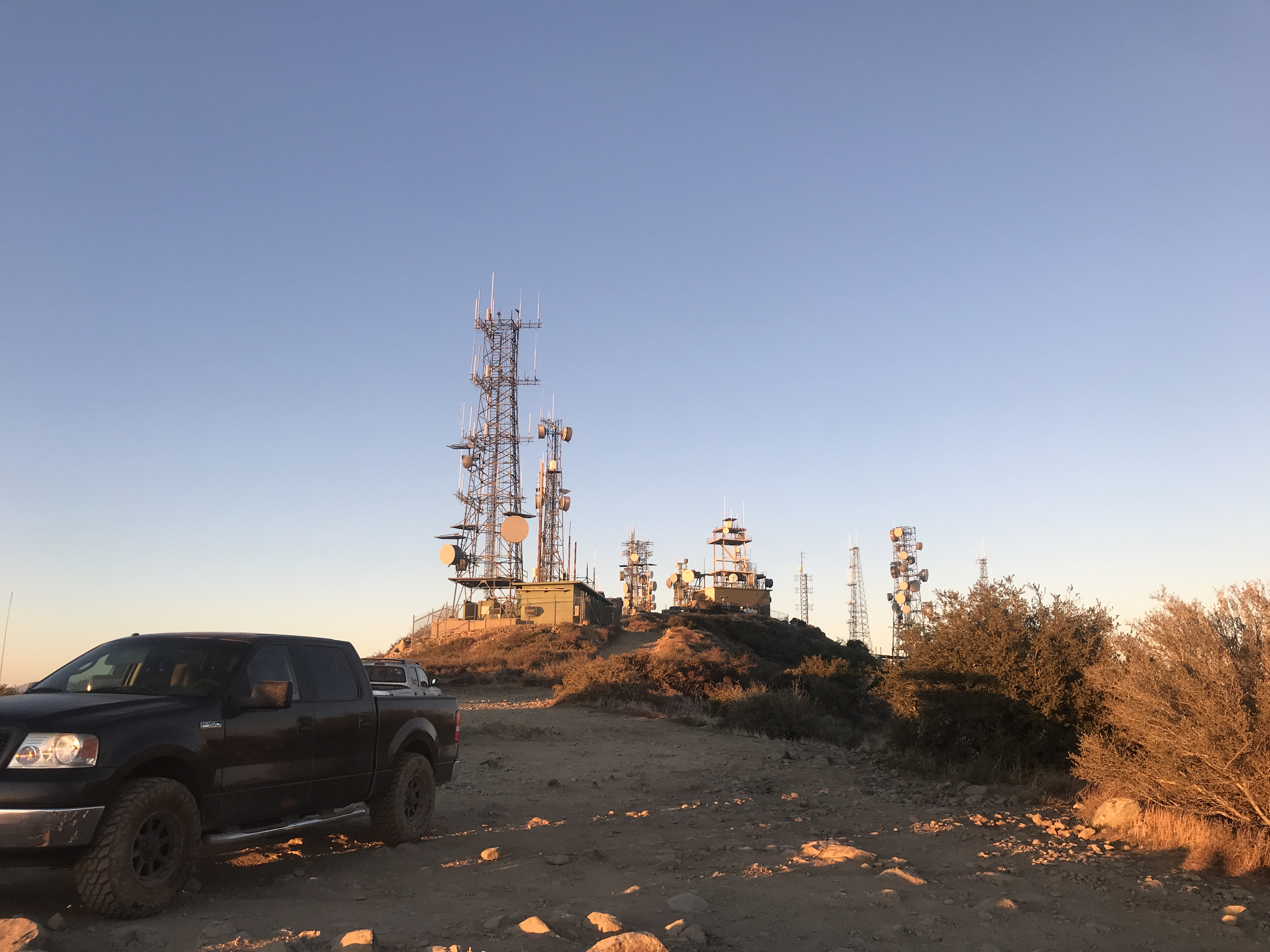
Santiago Peak looking north (November 2021)

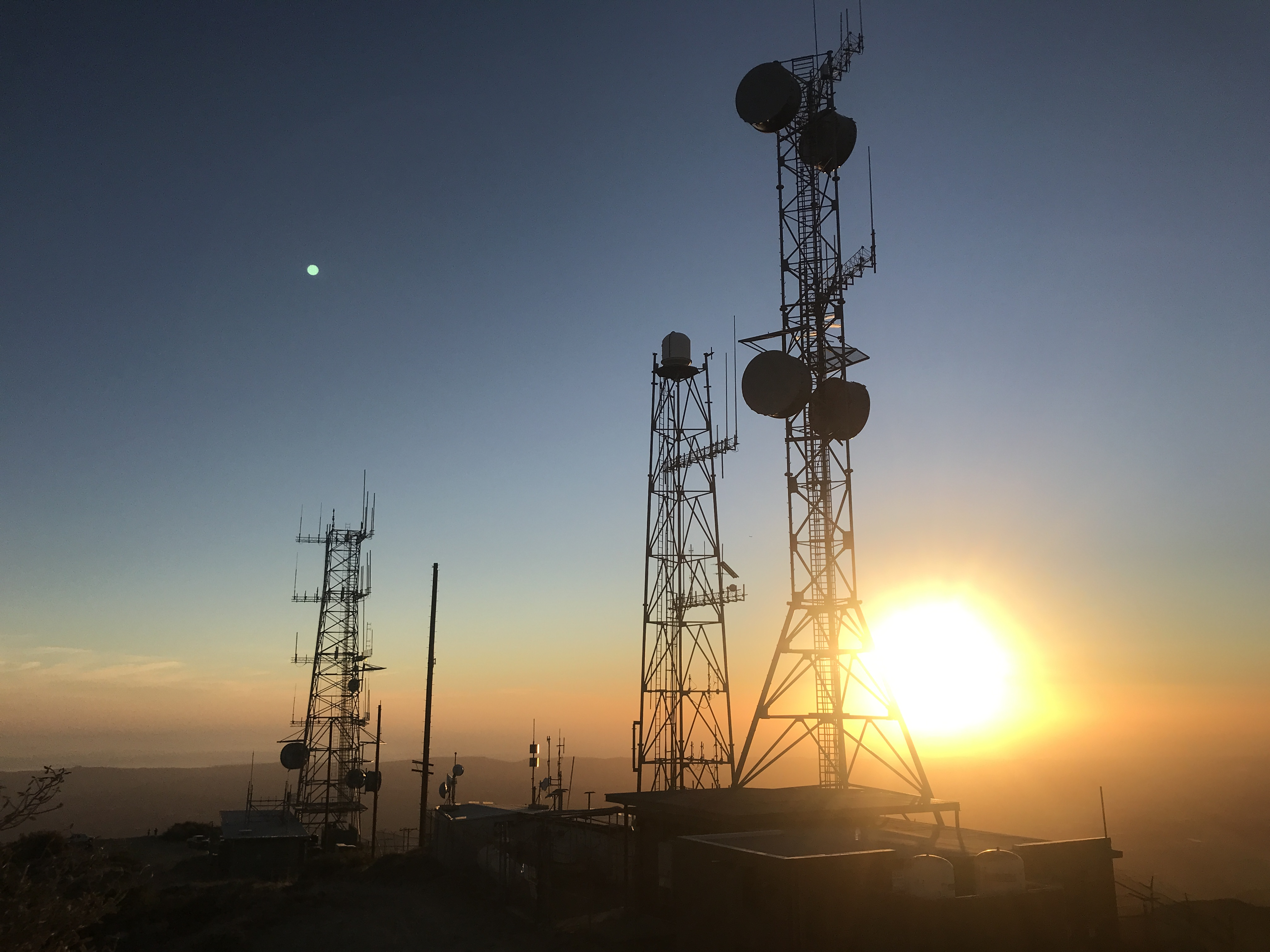
Santiago Peak at sunset, looking west (November 2021)

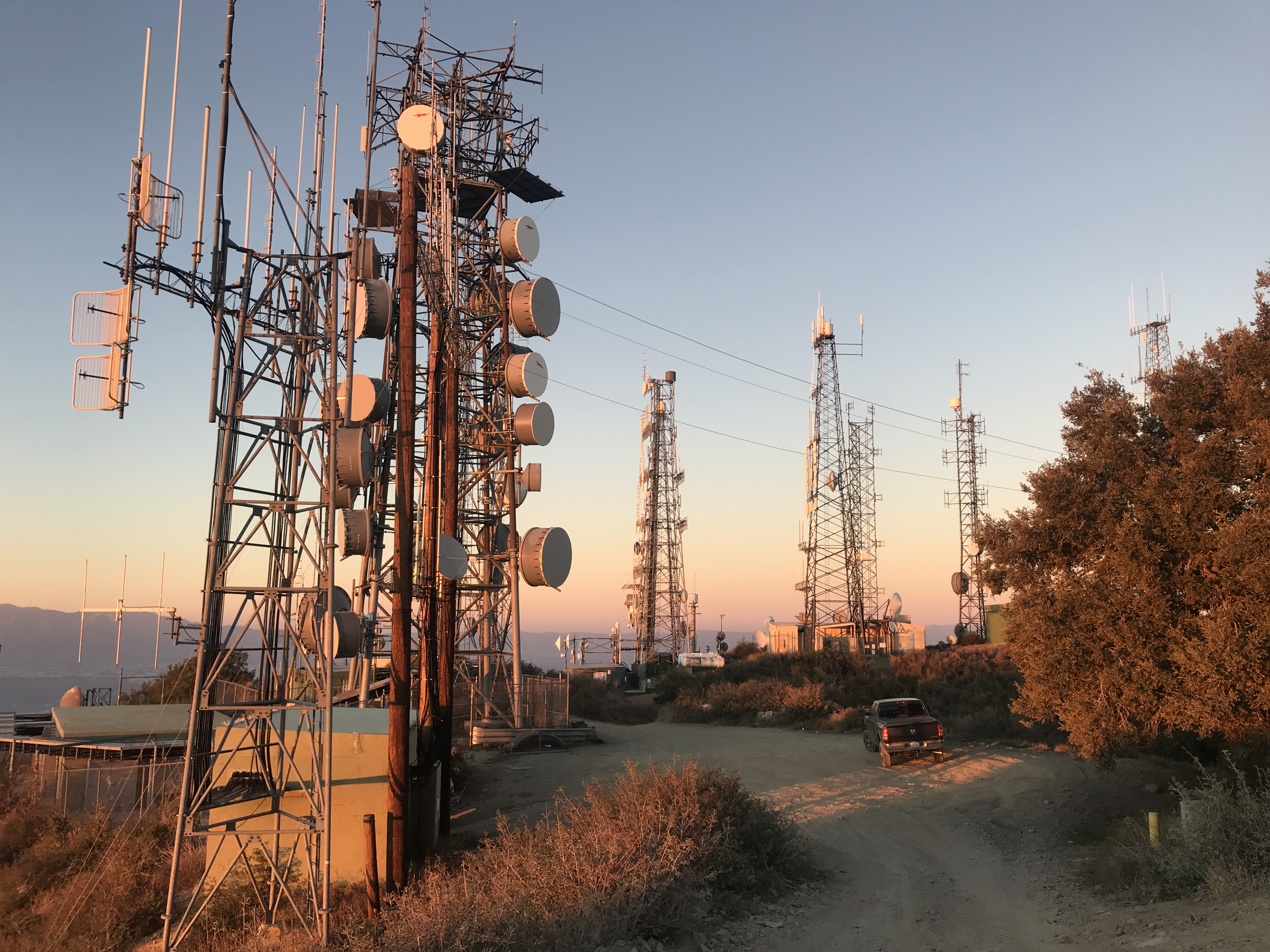
Center of Santiago Peak, looking north (November 2021)

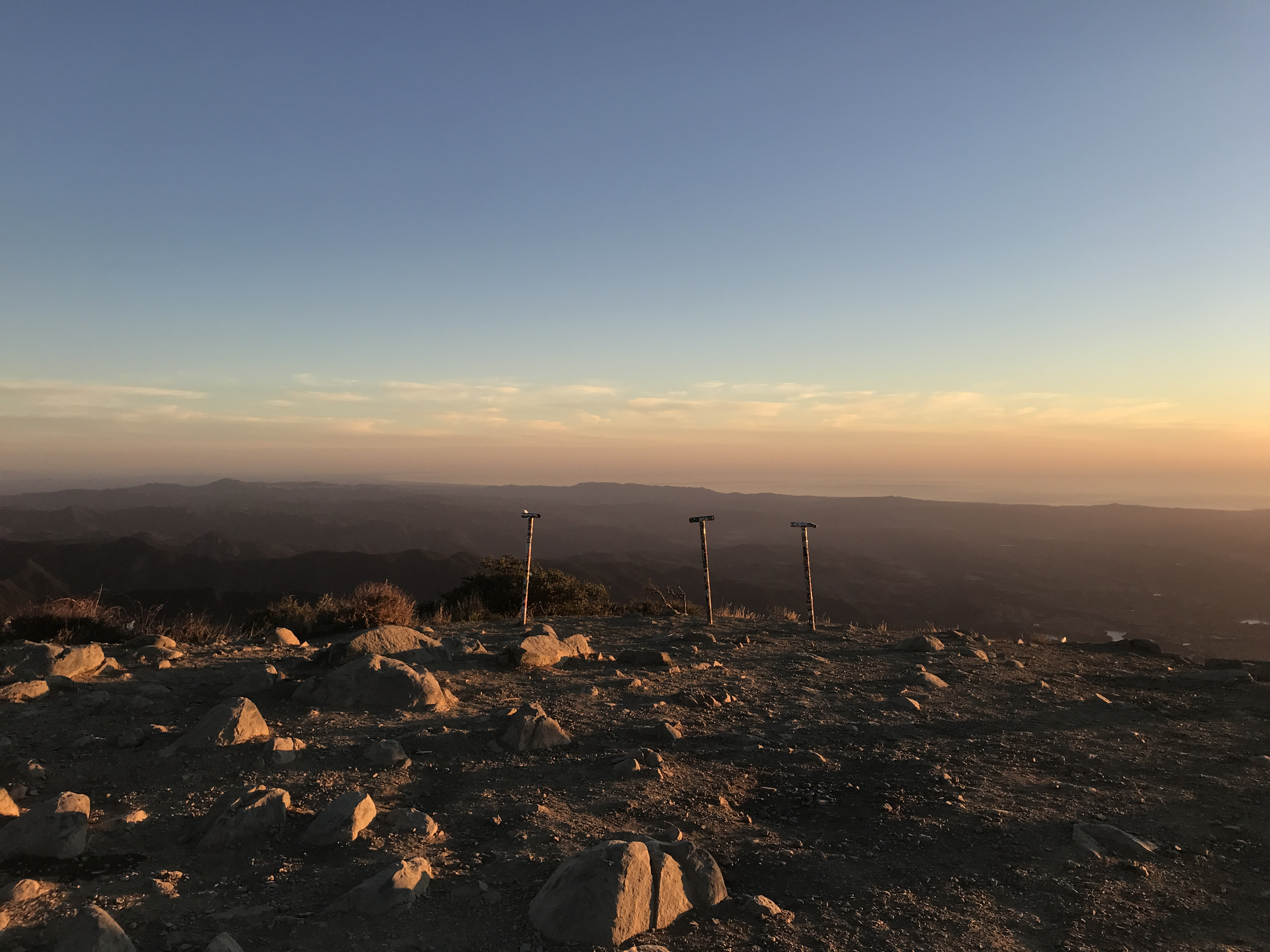
Santiago Peak at sunset, looking southwest towards San Clemente (November 2021)

== See also ==
- List of highest points in California by county
