= Arroyo Trabuco =

Major tributary of San Juan Creek in Orange County, California

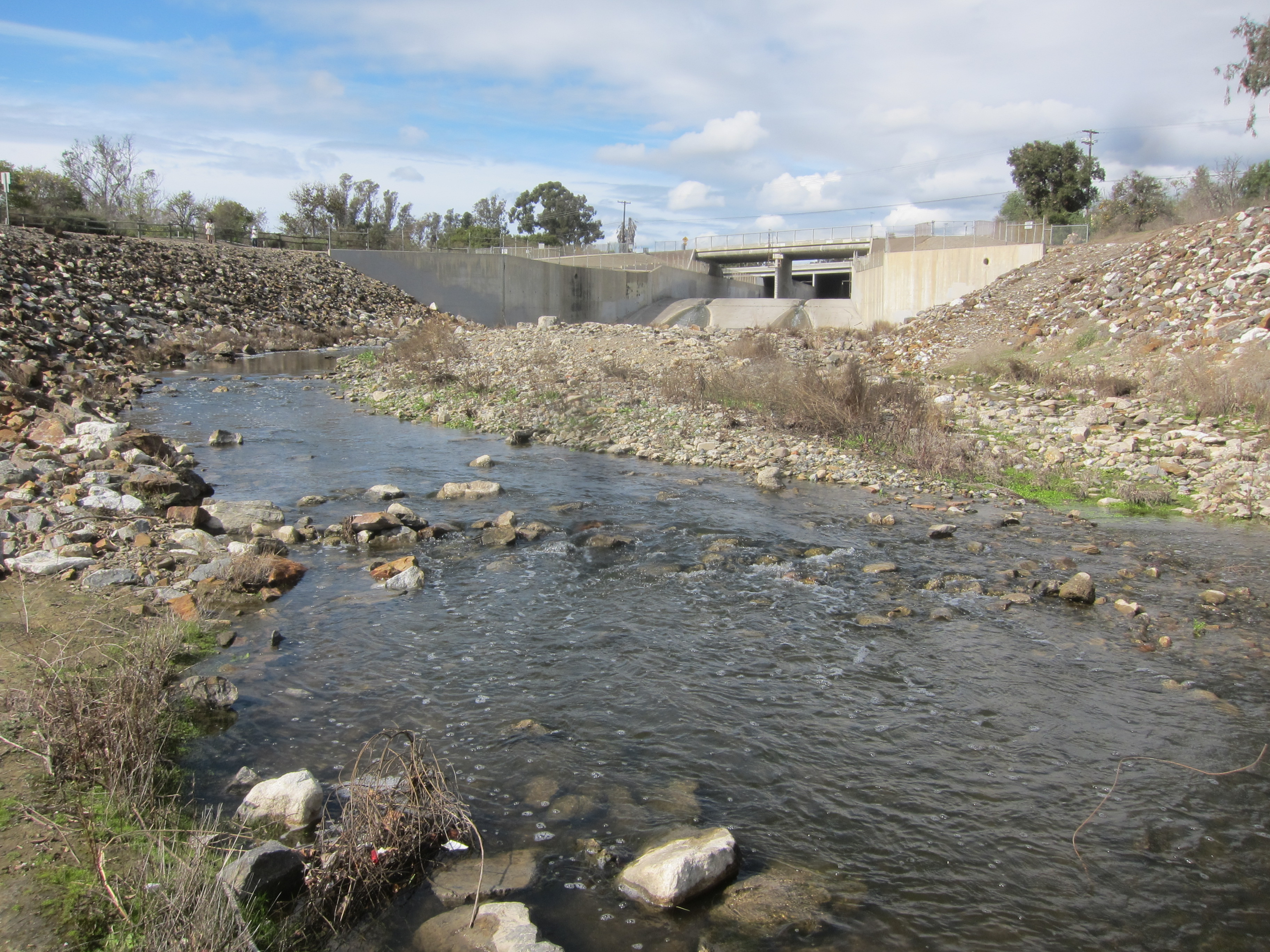
- Arroyo Trabuco shortly downstream of Interstate 5

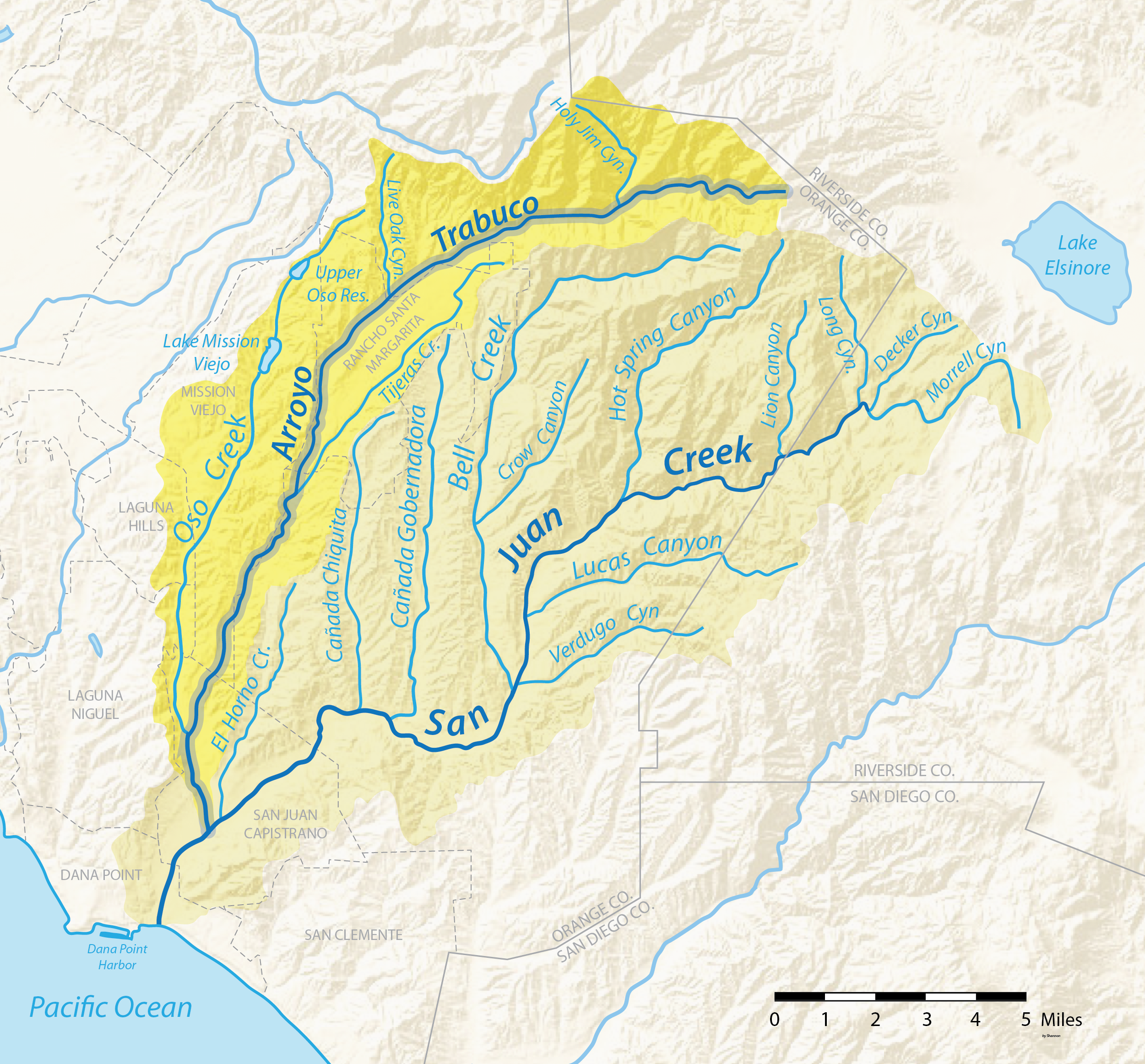
- Map of the San Juan Creek drainage basin with Arroyo Trabuco subbasin highlighted
- Etymology: "Trabuco" is Spanish for blunderbuss.

Location
- Country: United States
- State: California
- Region: Orange County

Physical characteristics
- Source: Santa Ana Mountains
  - location: Northwest of Rancho Santa Margarita
  - coordinates: 33°40′01″N 117°33′59″W
  - elevation: 4,310 ft (1,310 m)
- Mouth: San Juan Creek
  - location: San Juan Capistrano
  - coordinates: 33°29′24″N 117°39′57″W
  - elevation: 59 ft (18 m)
- Length: 21.8 mi (35.1 km)
- Basin size: 54 sq mi (140 km^{2})
- Discharge
  - location: San Juan Capistrano
  - average: 17.4 cu ft/s (0.49 m^{3}/s)
  - minimum: 0 cu ft/s (0 m^{3}/s)
  - maximum: 10,000 cu ft/s (280 m^{3}/s)

Basin features
- Tributaries
  - left: Tijeras Canyon Creek
  - right: Holy Jim Creek, Falls Canyon Creek, Oso Creek

Arroyo Trabuco (known also as Trabuco Creek) is a 22-mile (35 km)-long stream in coastal southern California in the United States. Rising in a rugged canyon in the Santa Ana Mountains of Orange County, the creek flows west and southwest before emptying into San Juan Creek in the city of San Juan Capistrano. Arroyo Trabuco's watershed drains 54 square miles (140 km^{2}) of hilly, semi-arid land and lies mostly in Orange County, with a small portion extending northward into Riverside County. The lower section of the creek flows through three incorporated cities and is moderately polluted by urban and agricultural runoff.

Acjachemen and Payómkawichum people lived along the perennial stream in settlements and hunting camps for 8,000 years before the invasion of Spanish colonization. Villages along the creek included Alauna and Putiidhem. Trabuco is Spanish for a Blunderbuss, a type of shotgun. Local legend attributes a Franciscan missionary friar traveling with the Gaspar de Portolà Expedition in 1769 for the story that a blunderbuss was lost in the upper canyon by the creek, and so the naming of the area. John "Don Juan" Forster received a Mexican land grant in 1846 for the canyon lands and creek and established Rancho Trabuco here.

In its natural state, Arroyo Trabuco supported one of the most significant steelhead trout runs in Orange County, and birds, large mammals, and amphibians still flourish in riparian zones along its undeveloped portions. Trabuco Canyon along upper Arroyo Trabuco, and long, narrow O'Neill Regional Park, formed from the original land grant of Rancho Trabuco in 1982, are popular off-roading, hiking, fishing and camping areas in the watershed.

== Course ==
Arroyo Trabuco begins in the Trabuco Ranger District of the Cleveland National Forest, just west of the Orange–Riverside County border, at an elevation of 4,310 feet (1,310 m). The headwaters of the creek are in the large and deep Trabuco Canyon just north of 4,400-foot (1,300 m) Los Pinos Peak and south of 4,604-foot (1,403 m) Trabuco Peak. The creek flows in this 2,000-foot (610 m) deep gorge for its first 4 miles (6.4 km), receiving Holy Jim and Falls Canyon creeks before it passes the unincorporated community of Trabuco Canyon, where Live Oak Canyon Creek joins from the right.

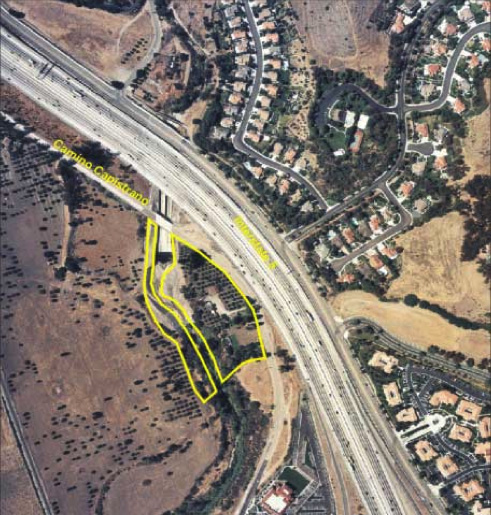
Arroyo Trabuco crosses underneath Interstate 5 in a culvert. Note that at first, there was only one culvert. Due to increasing flood control requirements, there are now two.

Once out of the mountains, Arroyo Trabuco changes from a swift mountain torrent to a meandering, braided stream crossing a wide sandy bed known as the "Plano Trabuco". After entering the city limits of Rancho Santa Margarita, the creek flows southwest through the long, narrow wilderness preserve of O'Neill Regional Park. It crosses under California State Route 241, a toll road that follows the western foothills of the Santa Ana Mountains, and passes close to Lake Mission Viejo, a popular recreational lake in the city of Mission Viejo.

Still steadily bending southwards, Arroyo Trabuco is joined by Tijeras Canyon Creek from the left bank, then passes under a high bridge for Oso Parkway and leaves the southern boundary of the regional park. After passing Saddleback College, located near the southern junction of California State Route 73 and Interstate 5, the creek flows through a residential community and is diverted into twin culverts underneath the interstate.

The creek flows over two large man-made drop structures, the first of which marks the beginning of a small canyon that it flows through almost until it reaches downtown San Juan Capistrano. Passing into the northernmost extreme of San Juan Capistrano, it is joined by its largest tributary, Oso Creek, from the right. The creek flows south through orchards until it is forced into a concrete channel, passes by Mission San Juan Capistrano, and joins with San Juan Creek in downtown San Juan Capistrano.

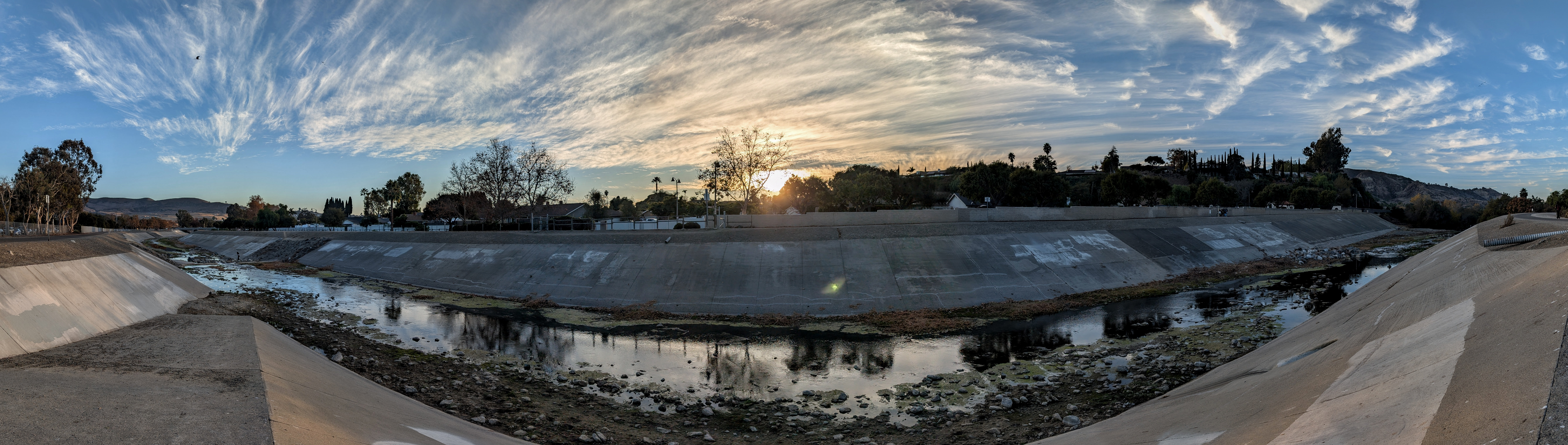
Panoramic view of Trabuco Creek in San Juan Capistrano

=== Discharge ===
On Arroyo Trabuco, the USGS operated two stream gauges, one from 1932 to 1981, and the second from 1973 to 2008, both near its mouth. The USGS refers to this creek as "Arroyo Trabuco". For the former gauge, the average flow was 6.22 cubic feet per second (0.176 m^{3}/s) or 4,500 acre-feet (5,600,000 m^{3}) per year, and the highest recorded flow was on February 6, 1937, water flow 9,240 cubic feet per second (262 m^{3}/s), with a stage of 6.8 feet (2.1 m). For the latter gauge, the average discharge was 17.4 cubic feet per second (0.49 m^{3}/s), 12,600 acre-feet (15,500,000 m^{3}) per year. The largest flow was 10,000 cubic feet per second (280 m^{3}/s) (estimated) on 23 February 1998, with a peak stage of 19.81 feet (6.04 m). The USGS states that "All or part of the record affected by Urbanization, Mining, Agricultural changes, Channelization, or other", explaining the large discrepancy in average flows between early and more recent records. Above their confluence, Arroyo Trabuco actually is longer than San Juan Creek, but San Juan Creek drains a larger area.

== Watershed ==
=== Geography and boundaries ===
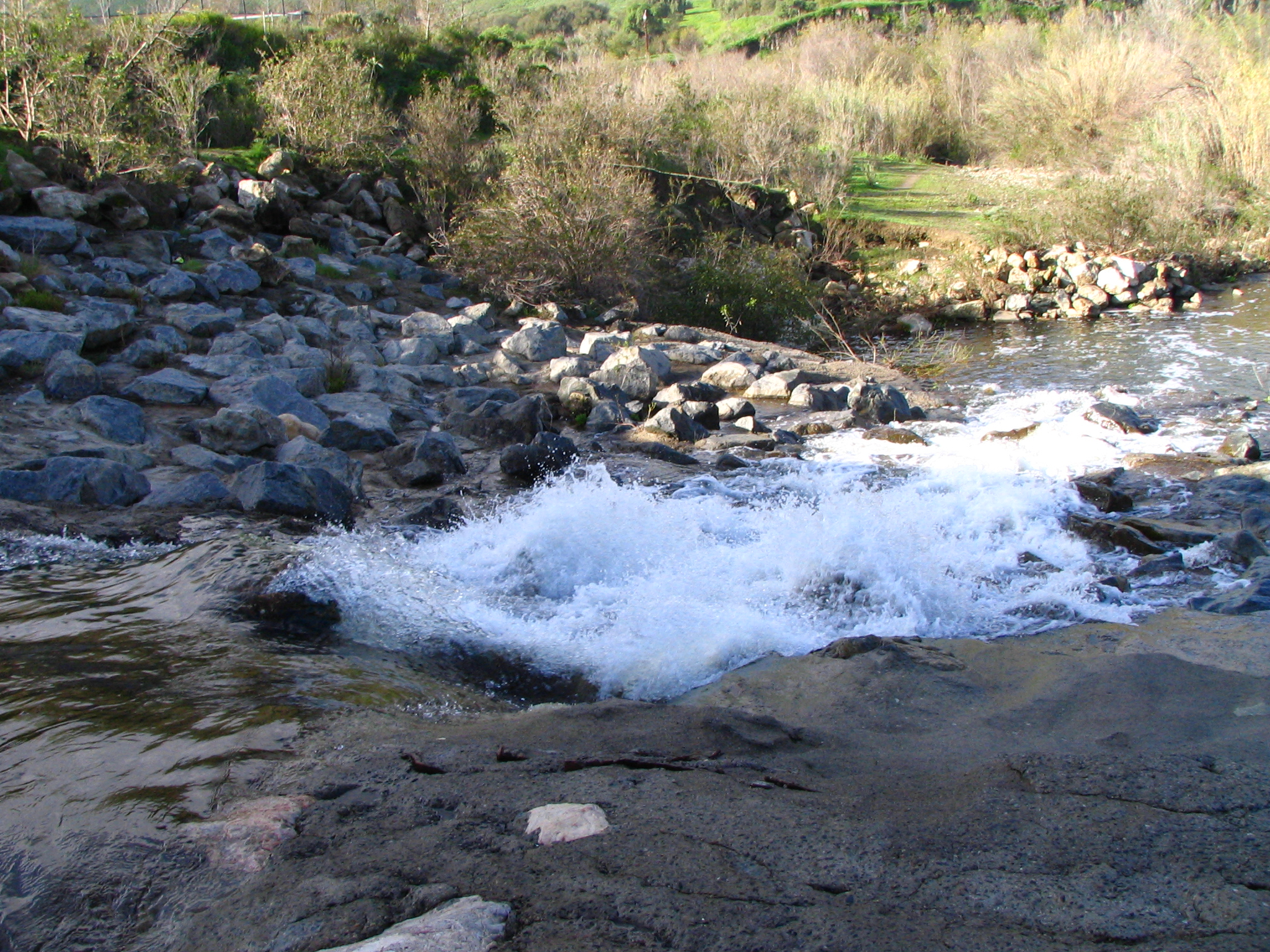
An artificial concrete waterfall on Arroyo Trabuco, downstream of the Metrolink rail bridge and upstream of the Oso Creek confluence

The Trabuco watershed covers 54 square miles (140 km^{2}) in the northern and far eastern parts of the San Juan Creek watershed. Located in an arid coastal basin in southern Orange County, the creek's watershed comprises 40.3% of the 133.9-square-mile (347 km^{2}) San Juan Creek watershed. It makes a wide bend from northeast to southwest, bounded by the Santa Ana Mountains to the north, the foothills of the Santa Anas to the west, and a drainage divide within the San Juan watershed itself on the south and east.

Although much of the Arroyo Trabuco watershed is bounded by the San Juan Creek basin it also borders on several other major Orange and Riverside County watersheds. Listed from east to west, the major San Juan Creek subwatersheds it bounds are Bell Canyon, Cañada Gobernadora, Cañada Chiquita and El Horno Creek. Arroyo Trabuco's headwaters are actually not physically far from that of Bell Canyon and San Juan Creek, the first of which is the second longest tributary of San Juan Creek. On the west of the Arroyo Trabuco watershed is the Aliso Creek drainage basin, on the north the Santiago Creek, and on the northeast streams draining into the Lake Elsinore area.

There are between 140,000 and 145,000 people living in the major cities in the Arroyo Trabuco watershed.

=== Geology ===
Geologically the present-day Arroyo Trabuco basin did not exist as early as the end of the most recent Ice Age. The Santa Ana Mountains, forming the northern, eastern and southeastern boundaries of the entire San Juan Creek watershed, did not begin to form until roughly 5.5 million years ago (MYA). The Santa Ana Mountains at the headwaters of San Juan Creek are composed primarily of Jurassic-age (196.6-145.5 MYA) igneous and sedimentary rock overlain by Cretaceous-age (145.5-66 MYA) granite, gabbro, tolamite, siltstone, sandstone and conglomerates. The underlying rock of the Santa Ana foothills are Paleogene-age (66–2.59 MYA) sandstone.

As the Santa Ana Mountains rose, Arroyo Trabuco first formed as a canyon cut into the southeastern part of the range. Many of the creeks draining the range—including Santiago Creek, San Diego Creek, Bell Canyon and San Juan Creek—first formed in the same way. The uplift of the San Joaquin Hills, a coastal mountain range generally following the Pacific coast of Orange County, created a physical barrier for these streams flowing off the Santa Ana Mountains. But by the Wisconsinian Glaciation, an enormous climate change helped solve that problem. During the Wisconsinian Glaciation, a period of time that lasted from about 70,000 to 10,000 years ago, glaciers and ice sheets moved south from northern Canada into the northern United States, radically altering the climate of the entire continent. The arid Southern California climate was supplanted by a temperate rainforest climate that would receive rainfall in excess of 80 to 90 inches (2,000 to 2,300 mm) per year. Arroyo Trabuco and other streams along the Orange County coast became powerful rivers that cut their way through the San Joaquin Hills.

This changed climate did not last, and by the time it had ended, several enormous canyons had been cut through the 600-to-1,000-foot (180 to 300 m) high San Joaquin Hills. The Trabuco/San Juan Creek canyon is one of the less prominent ones, and is the last canyon before the San Joaquin Hills continue south into San Diego County. Because of the enormous erosion channels carved out by the Wisconsinian-era rivers, the creeks now flow on broad and deep beds of sediment that have filled these canyons.

=== Pollution and modifications ===
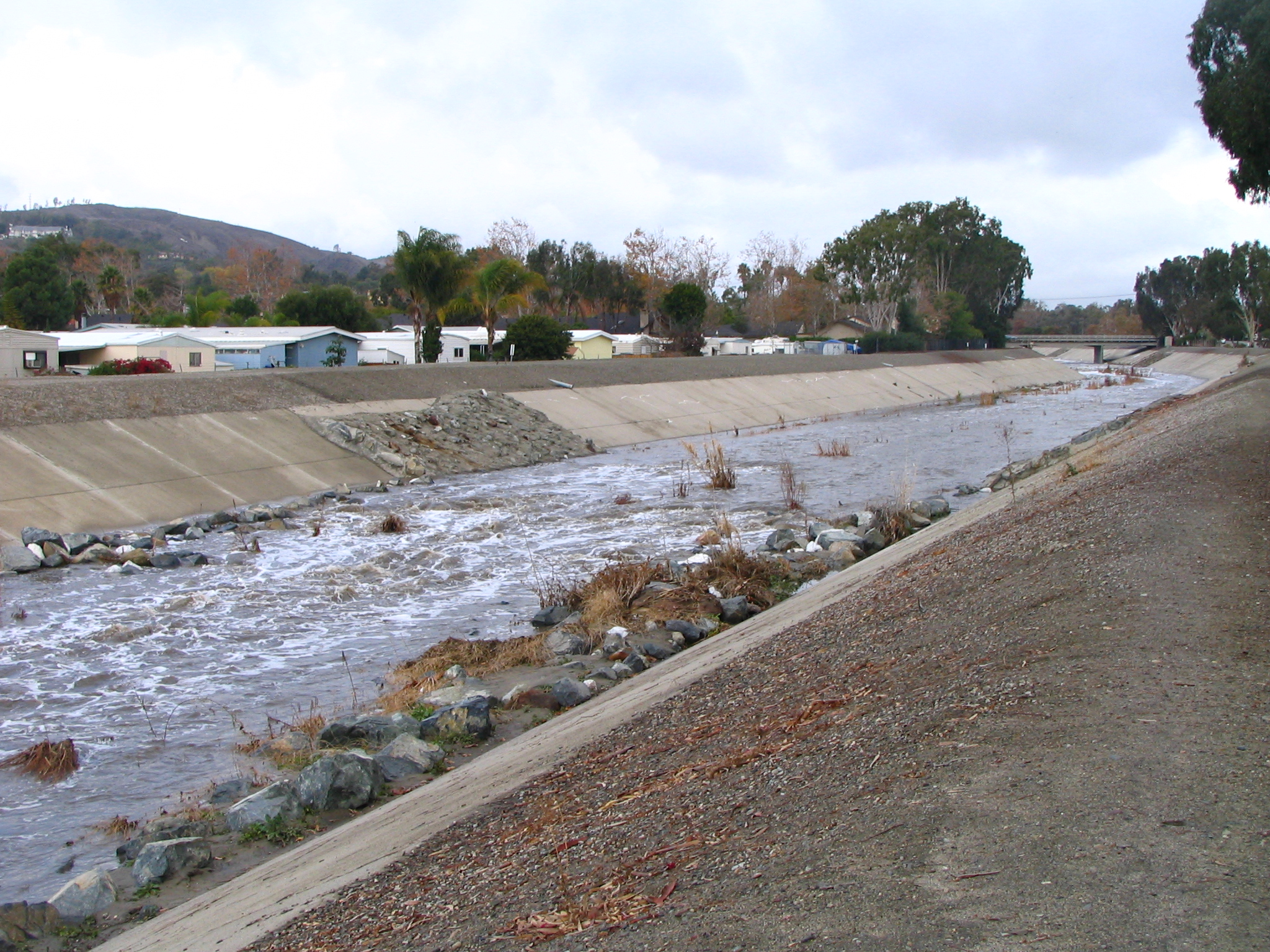
Arroyo Trabuco filled with urban runoff after a storm

The Arroyo Trabuco watershed, especially the Oso Creek subwatershed, has been severely affected by suburban development. Lower riparian areas along the creek have been damaged by channelization and contaminated runoff from the creek contributes to pollution problems in Capistrano Bight at the mouth of San Juan Creek at Dana Point. Such pollutants include urban runoff, fertilizers, heavy metals and oils.

There is one dam on Arroyo Trabuco, located inside Trabuco Canyon. There are also many drop structures on the lower creek.

== Climate and biology ==
The climate of the Arroyo Trabuco watershed is almost entirely semi-arid. Scrubland and chaparral make up most of the vegetation in the hilly and sometimes mountainous watershed. 16 different vegetation "bands", or zones, have been identified in the San Juan Creek watershed as a whole, and most of these also exist in the Arroyo Trabuco watershed. These range from riparian to chaparral, coastal sage scrub and rocky outcroppings where little to no vegetation grows. In the undeveloped Plano Trabuco, there are grasslands, while most of the middle section of the Arroyo Trabuco valley is urbanized.

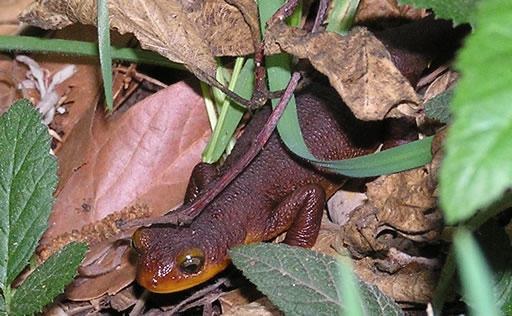
Newt in Holy Jim Canyon, a tributary gorge of Arroyo Trabuco

Riparian zones, consisting of small to medium-sized trees and a variety of other streambank flora, line Arroyo Trabuco, Tijeras Canyon Creek, and the upper tributaries including Live Oak Canyon, Falls Canyon and Holy Jim Canyon. These riparian habitats are now only found in the upper watershed. Oso Creek is heavily developed, and has little to no riparian vegetation. Lower Arroyo Trabuco still supports some riparian zones, but they have decreased in health because of the introduction of urban and agricultural runoff.

Aside from the large mammals including mountain lions, coyotes, and bobcats (the last California grizzly bear in the Santa Ana Mountains was shot near Trabuco Canyon) the creek was once a productive habitat for steelhead trout. Its upper portions, which include numerous gravel beds and bars, stream pools, and cascades, are suitable habitat for the anadromous fish, which still exist as rainbow trout in upper Arroyo Trabuco. Because of extensive modifications—affecting the stability and water quality of the creek—steelhead no longer migrate to the upper reaches of the Arroyo Trabuco watershed. Conversely, steelhead were sighted in 2003 and 2005 along the creek. A project was proposed in 2005 to build a fish ladder into a concrete drop structure in Arroyo Trabuco that blocks steelhead passage. $1.2 million was allocated by the California State Wildlife Conservation Board in 2005 to fund the project, but it has not been begun.

=== Flora ===
The canyon is in the California chaparral and woodlands Ecoregion, with California oak woodland and Chaparral plant communities of California native plants, with invasive plant species of Noxious weeds in the riparian and 'bunch grass' grasslands.

== History ==
It is hypothesized that Hokan-speaking Native Americans of Shoshone origin occupied a 12-mile (19 km)-long, 8-mile (13 km)-wide strip of land along much of central Arroyo Trabuco and most of Oso Creek, its major tributary, beginning at an unknown date. The Shoshoneans centered around the Trabuco/Oso Creek confluence and had a primarily hunter-gatherer way of life. Eventually, the people in the Southern Orange County/Northern San Diego County area settled down in semi-permanent villages, and this area became part of the Acjachemen tribal territory. There were two Acjachemen villages on the main stem of the Trabuco and one on Oso Creek, as well as numerous settlements at the confluence of San Juan Creek and Arroyo Trabuco all the way downstream to the Pacific. This was the historic landscape encountered by the Spanish conquistadors when they began expeditions to the area in the 18th century.

In 1769 Gaspar de Portolà led an expedition to the canyons of the Santa Ana Mountains. They camped on a bluff east of Arroyo Trabuco on the night of July 24–25, and the next day, one of the soldiers found his trabuco, or blunderbuss (the type of gun), missing. The expedition never found the gun, and they named the creek Arroyo Trabuco as a memorial. Mission San Juan Capistrano was established in 1776 at the confluence of San Juan Creek and Arroyo Trabuco.

Rancho Trabuco was a Mexican land grant that covered most of the upper Arroyo Trabuco watershed. Created in 1841, its boundaries were changed in both 1843 and 1846. In 1880, the land was sold to F.L.S. Pioche and the final owners were James L. Flood and Jerome O'Neill, who created the O'Neill Ranch out of the Rancho Trabuco. The name stayed and most of the ranch is now the site of O'Neill Regional Park, which was dedicated on October 5, 1982.

== See also ==
- List of rivers of Orange County, California

== Works cited ==
- "San Juan Creek Watershed Management Study: Feasibility Phase" (PDF). U.S. Army Corps of Engineers. Watershed and Coastal Resources Division of Orange County. August 2002. Archived from the original (PDF) on 2006-03-13.
