= Santa Ana Mountains =

Mountain range in California, United States

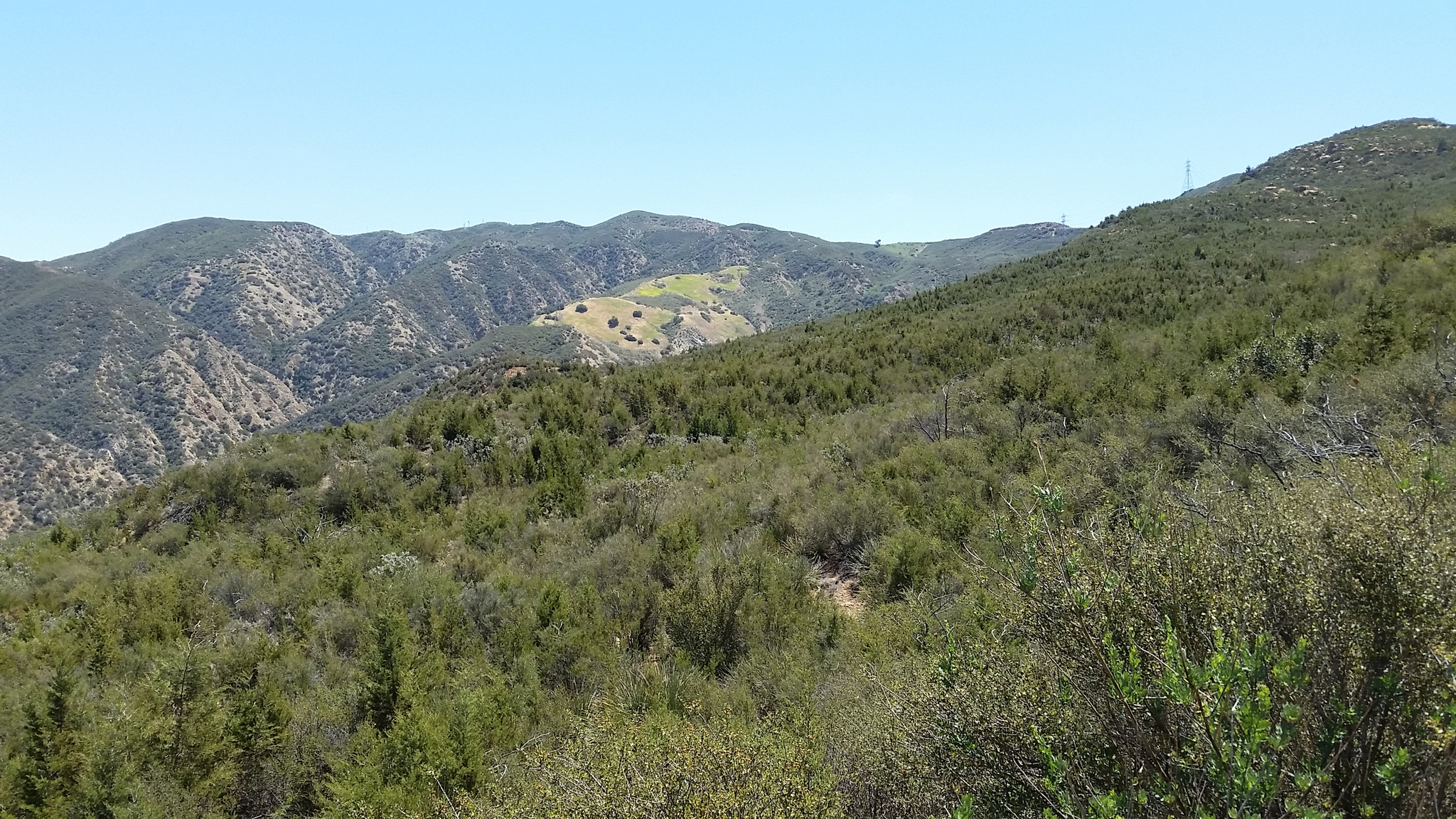

Highest point
- Peak: Santiago Peak
- Elevation: 5,689 ft (1,734 m)
- Coordinates: 33°42′38″N 117°32′03″W

Dimensions
- Length: 61 mi (98 km)
- Area: 2,104 mi^{2} (5,450 km^{2})

Geography
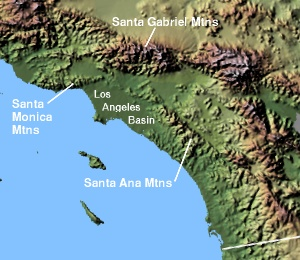
- Country: United States
- State: California
- Counties: Orange; Riverside; San Diego

Geology
- Rock ages: Triassic; Jurassic
- Rock type: Metasedimentary

The Santa Ana Mountains are a short peninsular mountain range along the coast of Southern California in the United States. They extend for approximately 61 miles (98 km) southeast of the Los Angeles Basin largely along the border between Orange and Riverside counties.

== Geography and climate ==
=== Peaks and boundaries ===
The range starts in the north at the Whittier Fault and Santa Ana Canyon, through which the Santa Ana River flows. To the north of the canyon are the smaller Chino Hills in Los Angeles and San Bernardino counties. The northernmost summit of the Santa Anas, at 3,045 feet (928 m), is Sierra Peak. From there, the major summits are Pleasants Peak, 4,007 feet (1,221 m); Bedford Peak, 3,800 feet (1,200 m); and Bald Peak, 3,947 feet (1,203 m). The next two peaks — Modjeska, 5,496 feet (1,675 m); and Santiago, 5,689 feet (1,734 m), the highest summit in the range — form Saddleback Ridge. Saddleback, located approximately 20 mi (32 km) east of Santa Ana, is visible from much of Southern California.

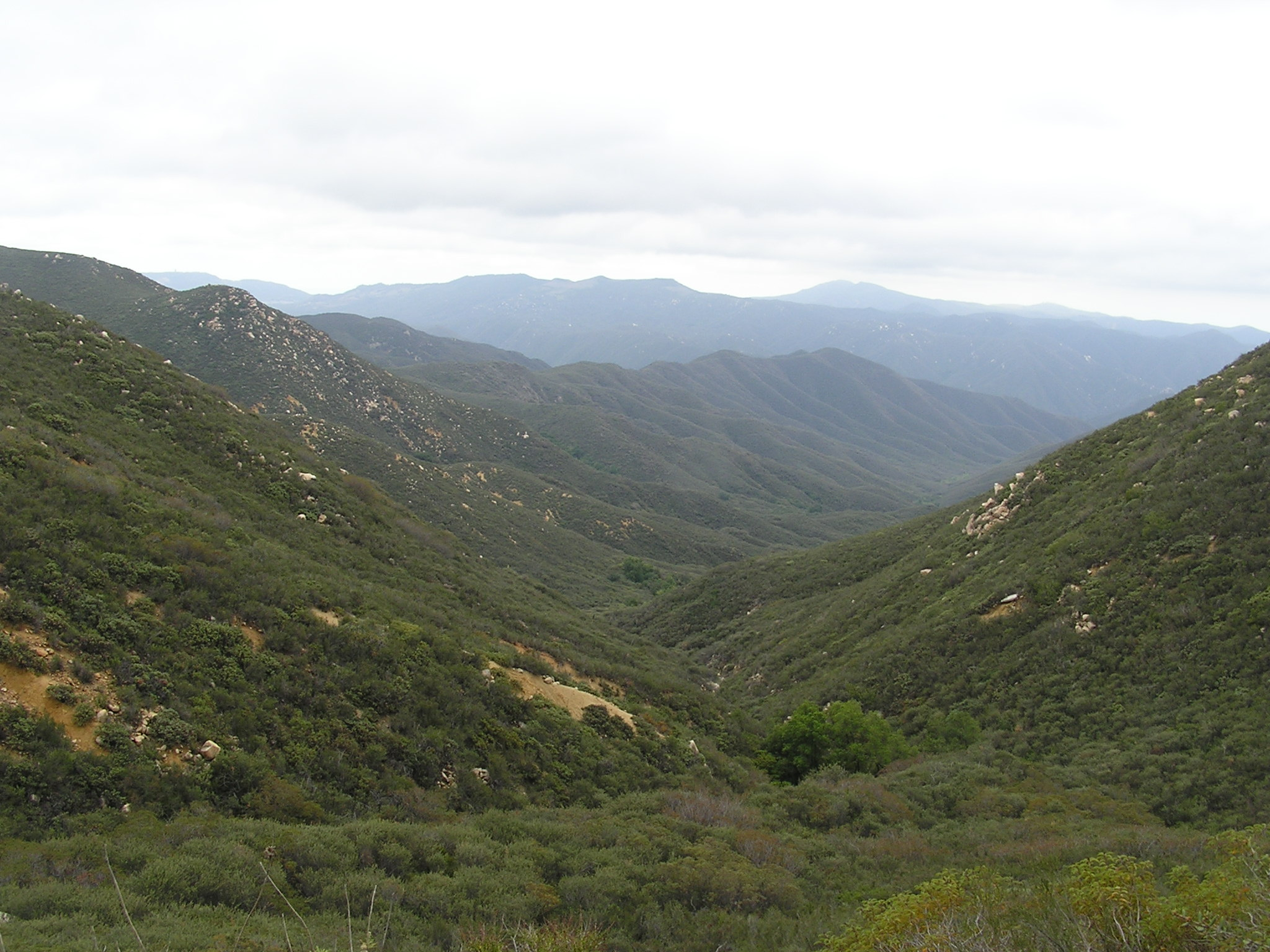
San Mateo Canyon Wilderness, southern Santa Ana Mountains, April 2007. Note the chaparral vegetation type, typical of the range

South of Saddleback are Trabuco Peak, 4,613 feet (1,406 m); Los Pinos Peak, 4,510 feet (1,370 m) and Sitton Peak, 3,273 feet (998 m). Elsinore Peak, 3,575 feet (1,090 m) is included in a subrange called the Elsinore Mountains, which are west of Lake Elsinore. San Mateo Peak 3,591 feet (1,095 m) marks the highpoint of this range. Margarita Peak, 3,189 feet (972 m); and Redonda Mesa, 2,825 feet (861 m) are part of the Santa Margarita Mountains, a subrange of the Santa Anas that extends down to Camp Pendleton and Fallbrook. Southeast of the Elsinore Mountains is the Santa Rosa Plateau, named for the Rancho Santa Rosa that once encompassed it. At the south end of the plateau there is a steep escarpment from the basalt capped mesas that line it, that descends from about 500 feet at Mesa de Burro to Sandia Creek on the east to about 1800 feet at Avenaloca Mesa to De Luz Creek in the west. From the foot of the escarpment, the mountains and canyons of De Luz, Sandia Creek and others below it, run to the south to the Santa Margarita River. The range ends roughly at the Santa Margarita River.

Much of the range is within the Trabuco Ranger District of the Cleveland National Forest, although some parts are still owned by two century-old ranches: the Irvine Ranch (originally known as the Yorba Family's Rancho Lomas de Santiago) and Rancho Mission Viejo (originally recorded as Rancho Misión Vieja).

=== Waterways ===
The Santa Anas include a number of high-mountain streams that flow for all or most of the year, although once out of the foothills these waterways are ephemeral. The major streams rising from the western side of the range drain into the Pacific Ocean; these include Peters Canyon Wash, Serrano Creek, San Diego Creek, Aliso Creek, Trabuco Creek, San Juan Creek, and San Mateo Creek. The northern side of the range is defined by the Santa Ana River, which heads about 50 miles (80 km) further east, in the San Bernardino Mountains. Santiago Creek drains much of the northern part of the range and empties into the Santa Ana River near downtown Orange.

Water from the north-east side of the range empties into Temescal Creek which flows north to the Santa Ana River, or Lake Elsinore which intermittently overflows to Temescal Creek. The southeast end of the range is marked by the Santa Margarita River, which also originates east of the Santa Anas and flows southwest to the Pacific. Runoff from the southeast side of the range drains into Murrieta Creek, a tributary of the Santa Margarita River.

Irvine Lake, the largest body of fresh water in Orange County, is in the northwest part of the range near Villa Park. The lake is formed by the Santiago Dam, which impounds Santiago Creek.

=== Climate ===
The climate is Mediterranean, with warm dry summers and cool wet winters. Annual precipitation totals range from 20 to 30 inches (500–760 mm) in the higher parts of the range above 3,000 feet (910m), as compared to the average of 13–16 inches (350–400 mm) in the coastal plain. Most of the precipitation falls between November and March. The western (coastal) slope is generally moister than the eastern slope. Snow falls during winter on the highest peaks.

== Human history ==
The mountains were named by members of Gaspar de Portolà's expedition, who camped below the mountains on July 26, 1769, the Feast Day of Saint Anne. At the time of Portola's visit, the Santa Anas were settled by three main groups of indigenous peoples, the Tongva in the north, the Acjachemen in the west and Payomkowishum in the east and south.

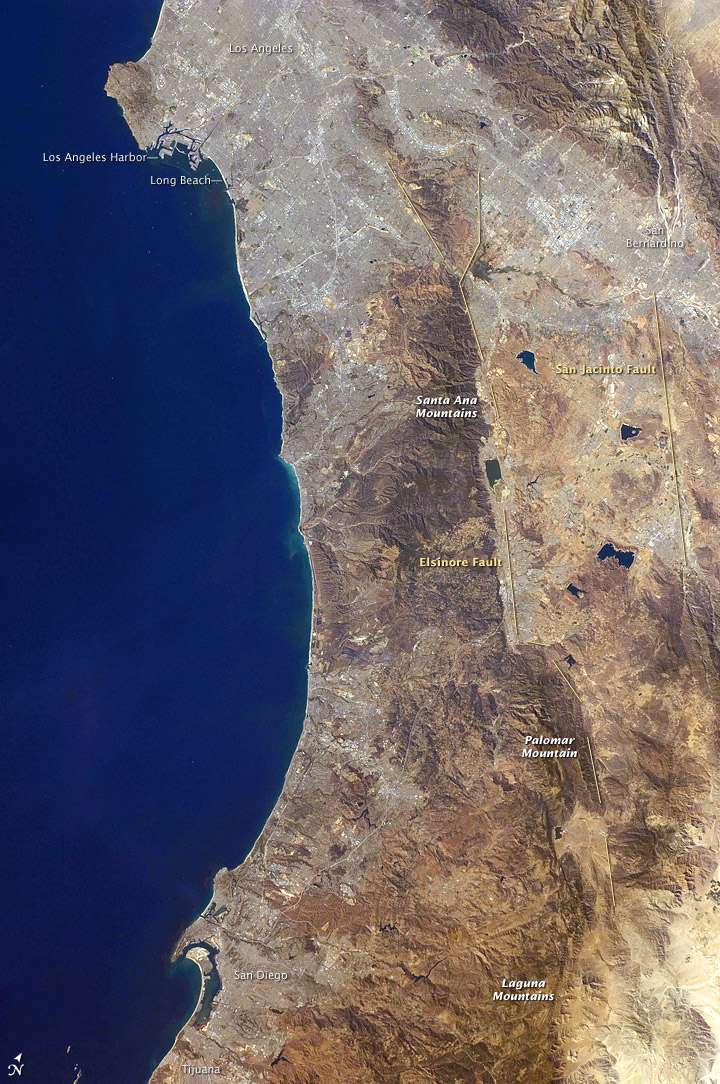
The Santa Ana Mountains, with other Peninsular Ranges and landforms in Southern California.

A handful of historic sites remain in the range today. Registered California Historical Landmarks include an Indian Village Site in Black Star Canyon, Flores Peak named for the outlaw Juan Flores, the mining boomtown sites of Carbondale and Silverado, and Helena Modjeska's home. The Moreno and Machado Adobes of the Rancho Santa Rosa are found on the Santa Rosa Plateau Ecological Reserve. Beeks Place, a small house foundation still owned by the family, is also located here.

The mountains were the site of the Indian massacre of Puhú village in 1831 in Black Star Canyon.

== Natural resources ==
=== Flora ===
As part of the California Floristic Province, the Santa Ana Mountains host a diverse array of plant species within distinctive natural (plant) communities, including coastal sage scrub, chaparral, riparian woodland, southern oak woodland, rocky outcrop, vernal pool, valley grassland, and closed-cone montane coniferous forest. One of the southernmost stands of madrones can be found in Trabuco Canyon. Groves of knobcone pine can be found around Pleasants Peak. Big-cone Douglas fir and Coulter pine can be found at the higher elevations. Rare flowers like the intermediate Mariposa lily, heart-leaved pitcher sage (associated with the Tecate cypress), and chocolate lily are difficult to find. Fragrant sages, broadleaf evergreen shrubs and trees, perennial bunchgrasses, succulents (Dudleya species), and fire-following flowers grow in the rugged terrain. Numerous ferns, including large sword ferns, are found under trees and near streams, especially at higher elevations.

=== Fauna ===
A surprising variety of wildlife species can be found, including mountain lion, mule deer, bobcat, coyote, gray fox, American badger, ring-tailed cat, spotted skunk, western gray squirrel, long-tailed weasel, dusky-footed woodrat, kangaroo rat, bats, spotted owl, western pond turtle, steelhead, coast horned lizard, least Bell's vireo, golden eagle, mountain quail, canyon wren, speckled rattlesnake, Pacific rattlesnake, common kingsnake, gopher snake, western fence lizard, arroyo toad, western spadefoot toad, California tree frog, California sister butterfly, various Aphonopelma species of tarantula, and many more.

The last wild California grizzly bear in the Santa Ana Mountains was shot and killed in the mountains in 1908. Pronghorn, California condor and jaguar were also once found in the range. The range was home to Mexican gray wolves, who were primarily found on Peters Canyon. These wolves hunted the last pronghorn who roamed the range in the early 20th century. By 1920, wolves and jaguars were extirpated from the range after the mountain range became a popular recreational destination.

=== Minerals ===
A number of minerals have been mined in the range, though none were very profitable. Commercial resources collected since the 1870s have included metals such as lead, silver, tin, and zinc, and minerals such as clay, coal, gypsum, and limestone. Parts of the range have been used to graze domestic livestock and harvest timber since the late 18th century. As the surrounding cities have grown, the water of the range's creeks has become a particularly valued resource.

== Transportation ==
The mountains form a natural barrier between the Inland Empire region to the east and the job centers of Orange County to the west. Only one freeway, the Riverside Freeway (State Route 91), the tolled Foothill and Eastern Transportation Corridor (State Route 241), and the two-lane Ortega Highway (State Route 74) connect the regions. Highway 91, which follows the Santa Ana River through a pass between the Santa Ana Mountains on the south and the Chino Hills on the north, is one of California's most congested routes. Because of this, several proposals have been floated to excavate a highway tunnel through the Santa Ana Mountains, although the multibillion-dollar idea has drawn criticism from environmentalists and others concerned about cost and safety in the earthquake-prone region. While Highway 91 is one of the most congested routes in California, Highway 74 holds a more ominous claim as one of the most dangerous highways in the state. State route 241 starts in Mission Viejo and runs alongside the foothills of the Santa Ana's while merging with State Route 133 and 261. The highway finishes at the junction with State Route 91.

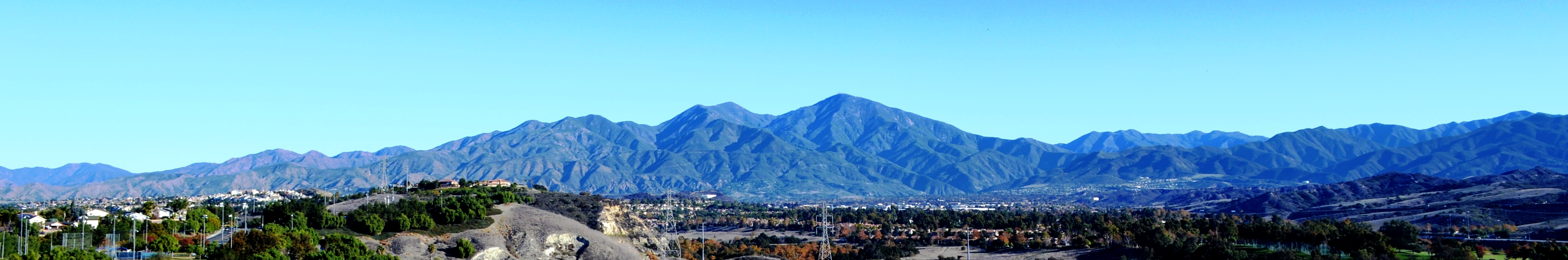
The Santa Ana Mountains as seen from Mission Viejo (December 2013) - The two highest peaks, Modjeska (left) and Santiago (right), form the Saddleback landmark.
