= Course of San Juan Creek =

Waterway in southern California, US

Coordinates: 33°27′42″N 117°41′01″W

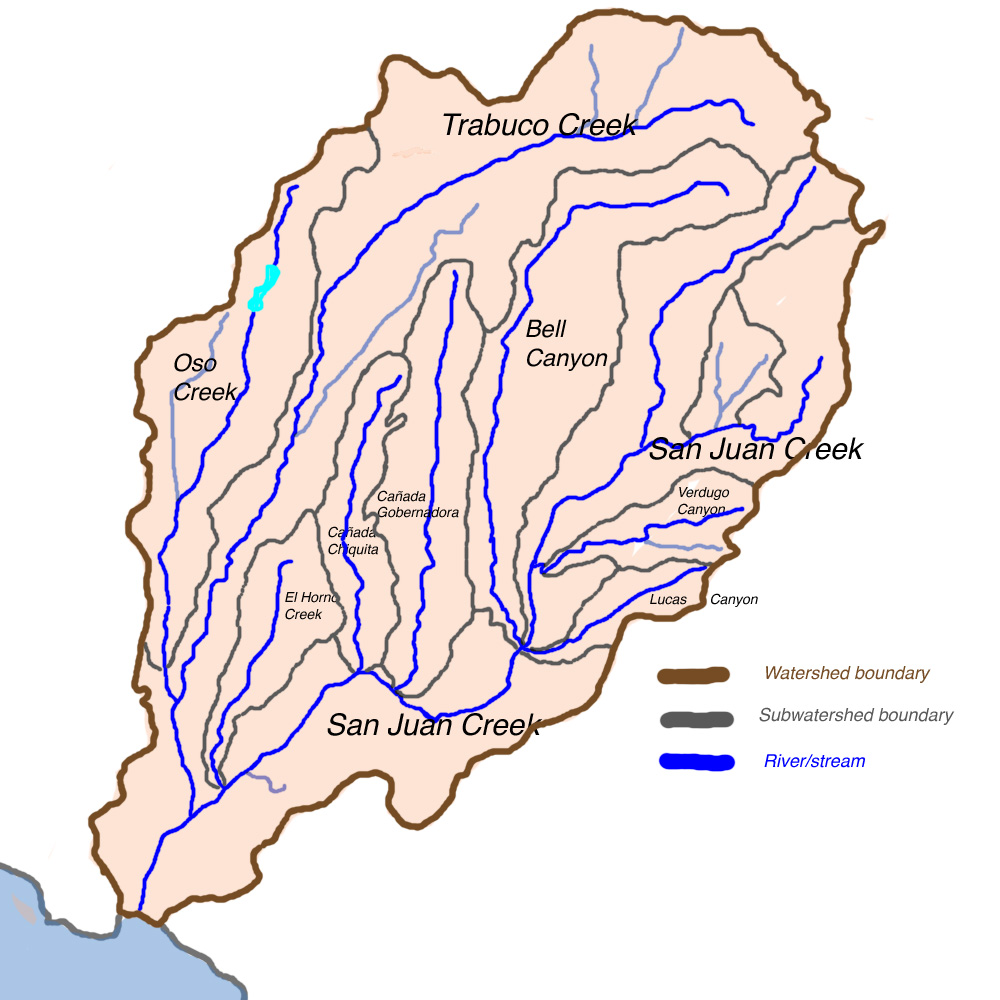
Map of San Juan Creek watershed

San Juan Creek is a creek in Orange County in the U.S. state of California. It is about 29 miles (47 km) long, and along with its major tributary, Trabuco Creek, drains 133 square miles (340 km^{2}) near the southernmost extent of Orange County.

== Headwaters to San Juan Canyon ==
San Juan Creek begins in the southern Santa Ana Mountains, a few miles northwest of Lake Elsinore. Its highest elevation is 5,100 feet (1,600 m) above sea level. Paralleling the Ortega Highway (California State Route 74) the creek flows erratically south, west and occasionally northwest. In the furthest upper reaches of the watershed, the creek is typically ephemeral. The creek channel in the uppermost few miles is a narrow mountain stream with many rapids and waterfalls, which include a series of large 5-to-15-foot (1.5 to 4.6 m) cascades, known as San Juan Falls. There are little alluvial deposits in the canyons, and the creek mostly cascades over bedrock. In this upper reach, the pool-and-riffle stream channel structure is evident. There are a few developments within the area, but most of the canyon is too narrow for development, and the only major structure that influences the creek throughout San Juan Canyon is Ortega Highway, which follows the course of the entire canyon.

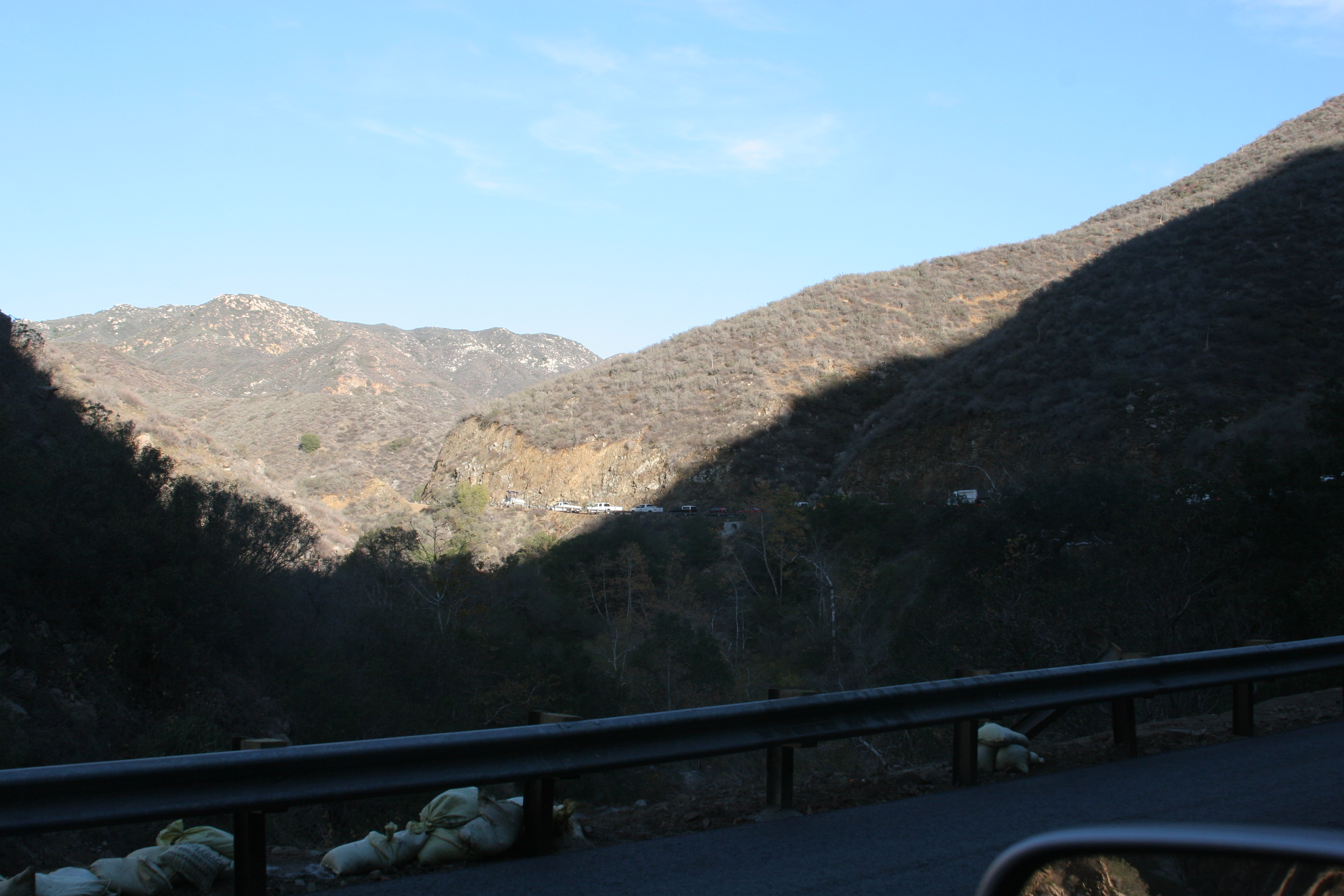
San Juan Canyon viewed from Ortega Highway

Leaving its uppermost headwaters, San Juan Creek flows south and west in several meanders, then finally proceeds to flow west-southwest. It is joined by the ephemeral watercourses Long Canyon and Morell Canyon on the right bank, and Bear Canyon on the left bank. At about this reach, it plunges over San Juan Falls, a 15-foot (4.6 m) drop; the falls is preceded by a short cascade and followed by a series of near-vertical falls. In this reach, stream pools, which tend to become stagnant during low flow periods, are abundant. Continuing on down the gradually widening valley, San Juan Creek turns westwards and drops over several more falls, before finally widening to about 330 feet (100 m). Just below the falls, a small perennial watercourse trickles into San Juan Creek on the left bank.

About 1 mi (1.6 km) below the falls, deposits begin to become apparent on the floor of the widening valley, and the creek spreads out, with short reaches of cascades between slackwater pools and more gradual courses. After flowing through this approximately 2-mile (3.2 km) valley, it narrows again to a steep canyon, receiving Lion Canyon on the right bank. It is crossed by the first major bridge, a stone arch bridge carrying Ortega Highway. After the bridge, the creek is joined by Hot Springs Creek on the right bank, which is fed by the San Juan Hot Springs; Cold Springs Creek meets San Juan Creek only about 2,000 feet (610 m) downstream, also on the right bank. About 1-mile (1.6 km) past Cold Springs Creek, Lucas Canyon Creek joins on the left bank.

== San Juan Canyon to San Juan Capistrano ==
After San Juan Creek exits San Juan Canyon, it spreads to a braided channel over extensive alluvial deposits on the floor of its valley. The width of the channel can range from 100 to 700 feet (30 to 213 m), and water flow is usually subsurface in the dry season. Agriculture and ranching are the primary land use in the middle reach. The creek bed meanders in large arcs, separated by numerous islands and bands of vegetation. At the beginning of this wider valley, Lucas Canyon Creek enters on the left bank. A few miles past this confluence, San Juan Creek receives the second largest tributary, south-flowing Bell Canyon, on the right bank, at almost the same point that Verdugo Canyon enters the creek on the opposite bank. Bell Canyon receives pollution from several residential communities that overlook, but do not border, it. The creek bends to the northwest, where it meets Trampas Canyon on the left bank. Shortly after Trampas Canyon, the third largest tributary, Cañada Gobernadora, enters on the right bank, along with Cañada Chiquita, after Gobernadora. The creek bends south again, passing an elementary school on its left bank. About 7.5 miles (12.1 km) downstream of Bell Canyon and 11.3 miles (18.2 km) downstream of San Juan Canyon, San Juan Creek enters heavily urban landscape in the city limits of San Juan Capistrano, from where it is channelized for the rest of its length.

In the reach between San Juan Canyon and the city, San Juan Creek is not channelized, but does have some modifications along its length. The Ortega Highway crosses the creek twice in this section, and notably at the first bridge, the creek channel is narrowed from 500 feet (150 m) to 100 feet (30 m). An access road crosses San Juan Creek near where it meets Bell Canyon, and at this point, the creek is diverted into 36-inch (91 cm) culverts. There are also gabions along San Juan Creek for some of its length, mainly preceding, at and after stream crossings. There are also two objects that form drops, but not impoundments, in the middle reach, one man-made and one natural. The man-made structure is a small gabion located at the entrance of Caspers Wilderness Park, which is near the west boundary of the Cleveland National Forest. The second is a natural sandstone outcropping below a bridge. The former is beginning to lose its original use and may be washed out by one large flood.

== Trabuco Creek to mouth ==
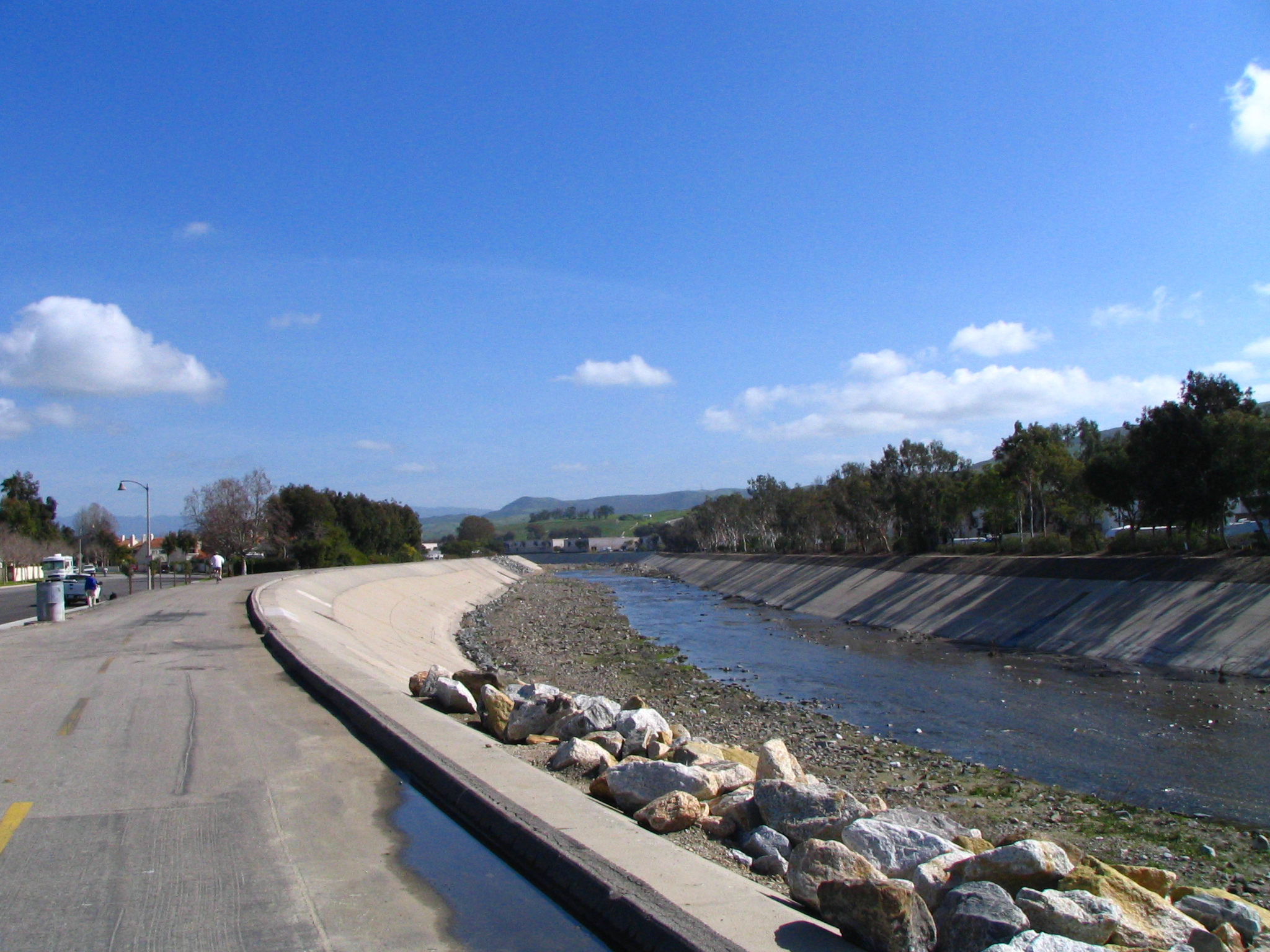
San Juan Creek flows through a flood control channel for its lower 2.7 miles (4.3 km).

The lowermost reach of San Juan Creek begins after it crosses underneath Interstate 5. After passing beneath the interstate, it is abruptly diverted into a trapezoidal flood control channel, with concrete levees and an earthen riverbed. The creek flows southwest, arcing gradually south, and very soon receives the underground discharge of El Horno Creek on the right bank. A few hundred yards past El Horno, San Juan Creek receives its largest tributary, Trabuco Creek, on the right bank. Trabuco Creek begins in the northeastern corner of the watershed and drains most of the watershed's north half. It flows primarily west then south-southwest, through a valley that is generally more developed than that of the mainstem. For much of its lower third, it winds alongside Interstate 5. At river mile 4 (river kilometer 6.4) it receives its major tributary, Oso Creek, on its right bank. In its final course, it flows into a south-flowing flood control channel that meets San Juan Creek inside San Juan Capistrano.

After the confluence with Trabuco Creek, San Juan Creek flows more or less directly south for about 2.7 miles (4.3 km), bending only once, slightly to the southeast, for this entire reach. The channel in cross-section is about 300 feet (91 m) wide and 20 feet (6.1 m) deep, with a bicycle path running along the west side. The creek crosses the boundary between San Juan Capistrano and the city of Dana Point, where its channel widens and further shallows. It is crossed by Camino Las Ramblas on a high bridge, then finally crossed by the Pacific Coast Highway on two lower bridges. Directly after this final crossing, San Juan Creek flows into a fresh-water lagoon 900 feet (270 m) south of the north end of Doheny State Beach, created by a tongue of sand that blocks the water from reaching the ocean. At its maximum extent, the lagoon forms a small lake that extends beneath the highway. Occasionally, the sand berm impounding the water is breached, causing massive runoff into the ocean. Despite the almost constant blockage of San Juan Creek here, it has been said that subsurface outflow also occurs through the sandspit; this means that Doheny State Beach and Capistrano Bay receive pollution from the creek almost constantly.
