= San Juan Hot Springs =

Historic geothermal site in California

- San Juan Capistrano Hot Springs
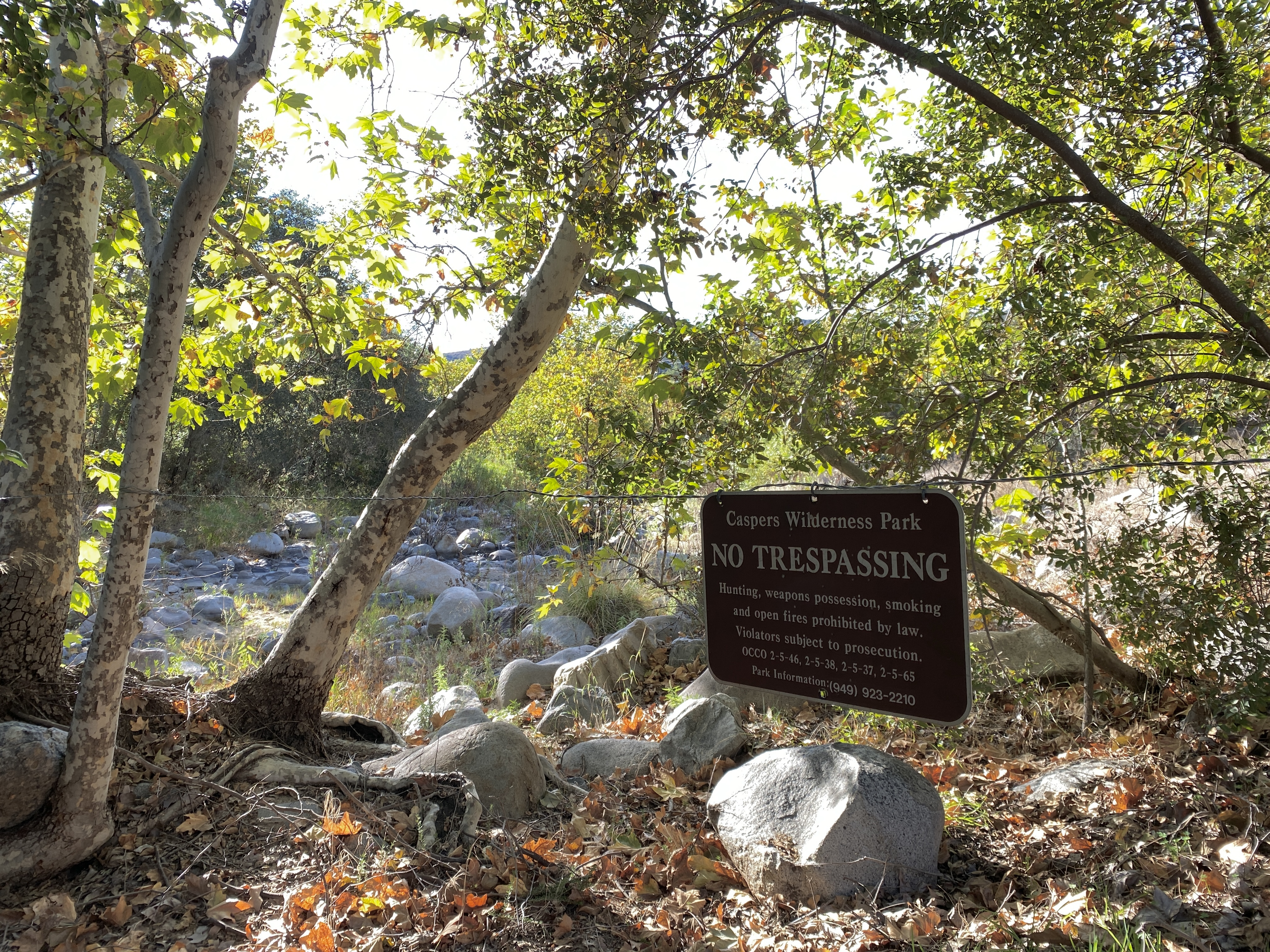
- Public access to San Juan Hot Springs has been restricted since approximately 1993
- Interactive map of San Juan Hot Springs
- Location: Ortega Highway, Ronald W. Caspers Wilderness Park, Orange County, California, United States
- Coordinates: 33.5908°N 117.5095°W
- Type: geothermal
- Discharge: 35 US gallons (130 L; 29 imp gal) per min
- Temperature: 122 °F (50 °C)

San Juan Hot Springs, also San Juan Capistrano Hot Springs, is a geothermal area in what is now Ronald W. Caspers Wilderness Park, near Cleveland National Forest, in Orange County, California in the United States. The springs were used by the Indigenous peoples of the region, and were an integral part of the dominion of Misíon San Juan Capistrano. They were later developed and used, on and off for a hundred years, as a resort area of post-settlement Southern California. The 52 springs were designated Orange County Historic Landmark No. 38 in 1989.

== History ==
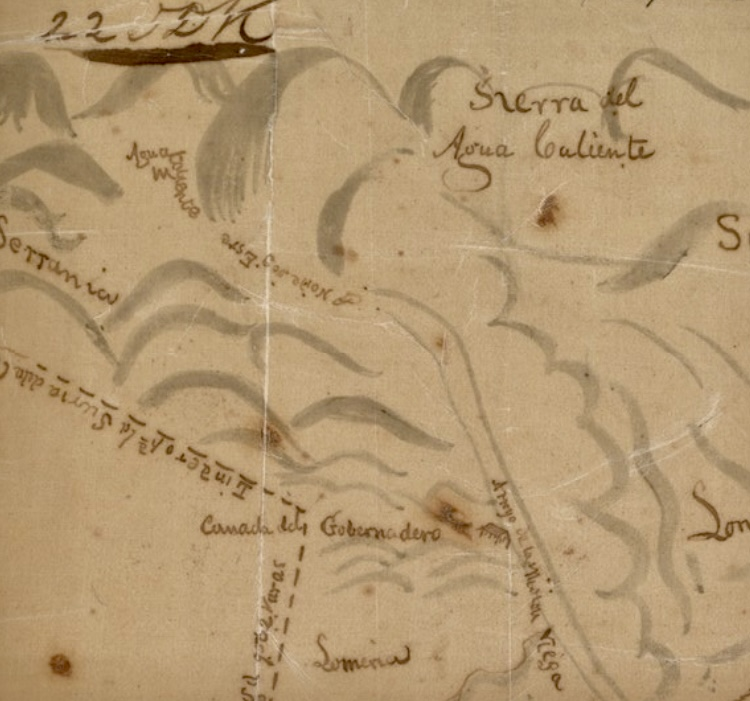
Agua caliente and "Sierra del Agua Caliente" appear on the 1840s diseño for Rancho Mission Viejo

According to Mission San Juan Capistrano's application for the National Register of Historic Places, "Published oral accounts indicate that a sizable Indian settlement was located near the springs." The Acjachemen (Juaneño) village at the springs was called Paala Sáqqiwvna, and the springs have been tentatively associated with the name Palasakeuna, although this correlation is disputed and may apply instead to Murrieta Hot Springs. According to U.S. government geologist Gerald A. Waring's report of 1915, the springs "were formerly visited by the Indians, who built mud huts (temescals), for use as vapor-bath chambers. The springs are mentioned in the records of the Franciscan friars, who visited them when in charge of the mission at San Juan Capistrano." After the missionaries came, they built an adobe structure near the springs that was used as a sort of parsonage or mission annex. An old-timer recalled the springs as they were in the 1870s, writing to the Los Angeles Times, "I have been familiar with these springs and their many benefits to mankind...since 1873 and can testify to the value of their mineral waters. Back in the seventies, there was a passable trail, and the wayfarer making a pilgrimage to the healthful shrine was sure of a friendly welcome from the native Indians that frequented the place, with their sick [and] lame..." In oral history interviews done in the late 20th-century, Acjachemen people described their grandparents going to the hot springs area in the autumn to collect acorns for food.

=== 19th century ===
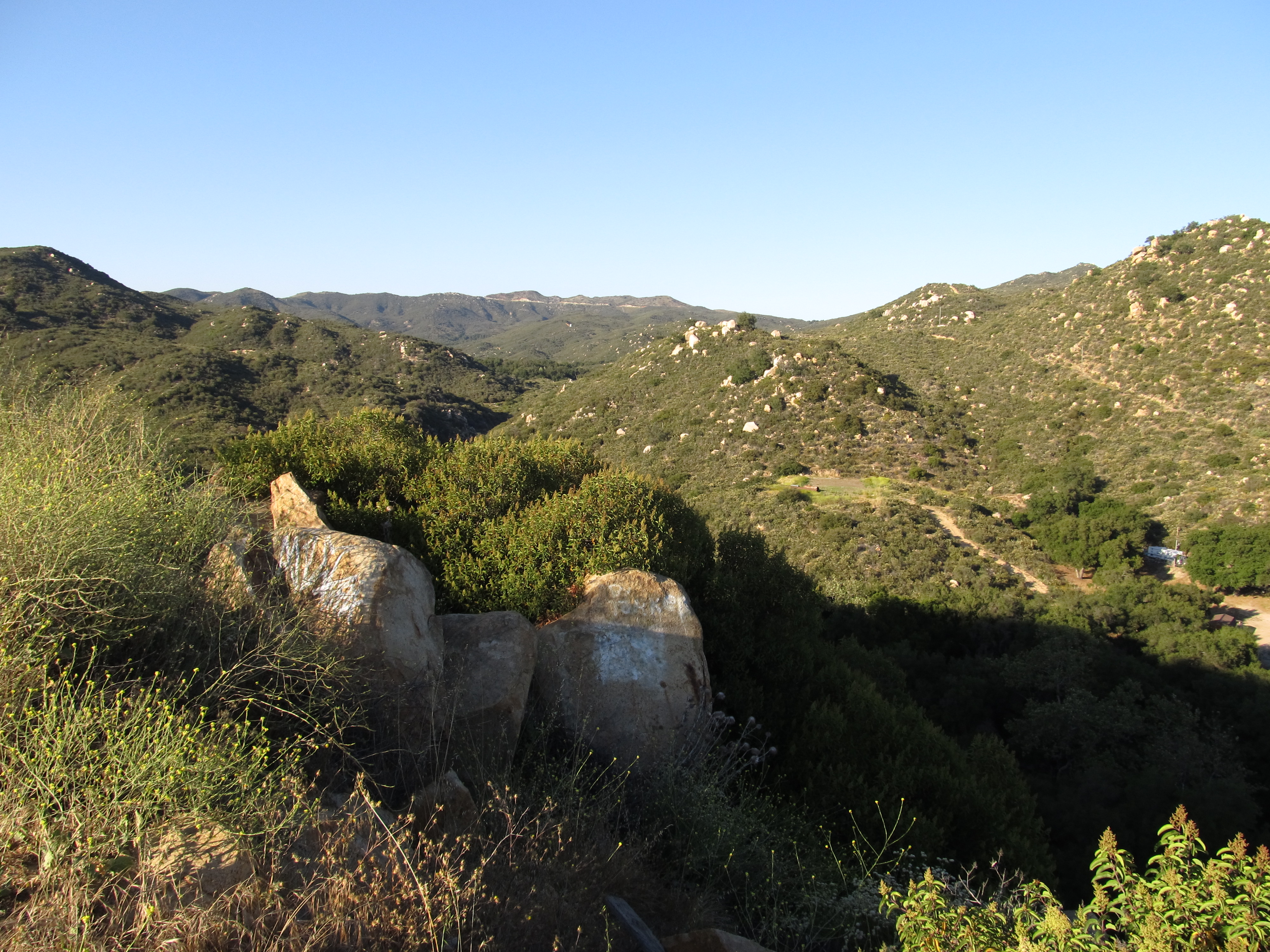
Landscape between San Juan Capistrano and Lake Elsinore

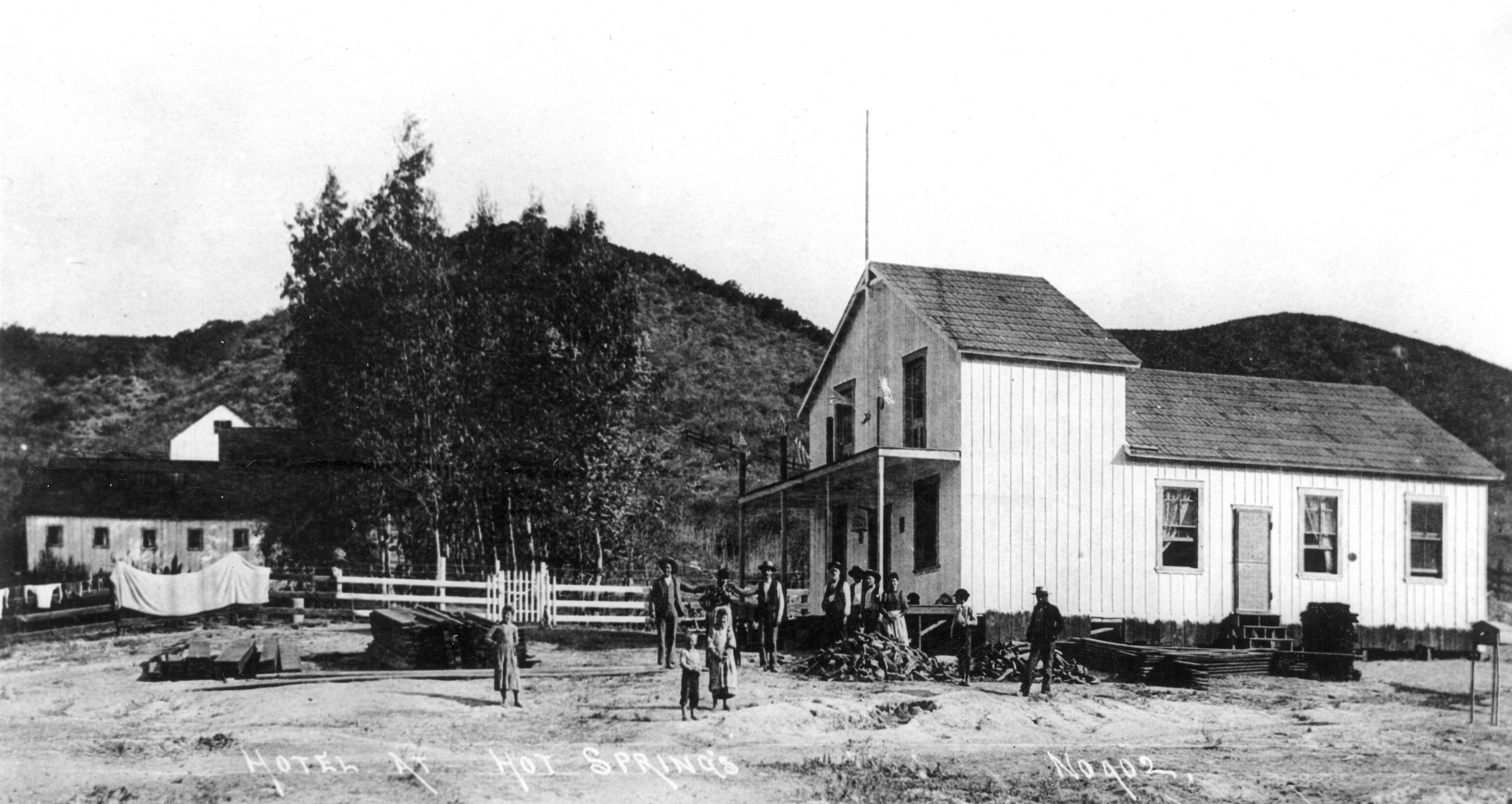
San Juan Hot Springs resort c. 1890 (Orange County Archives)

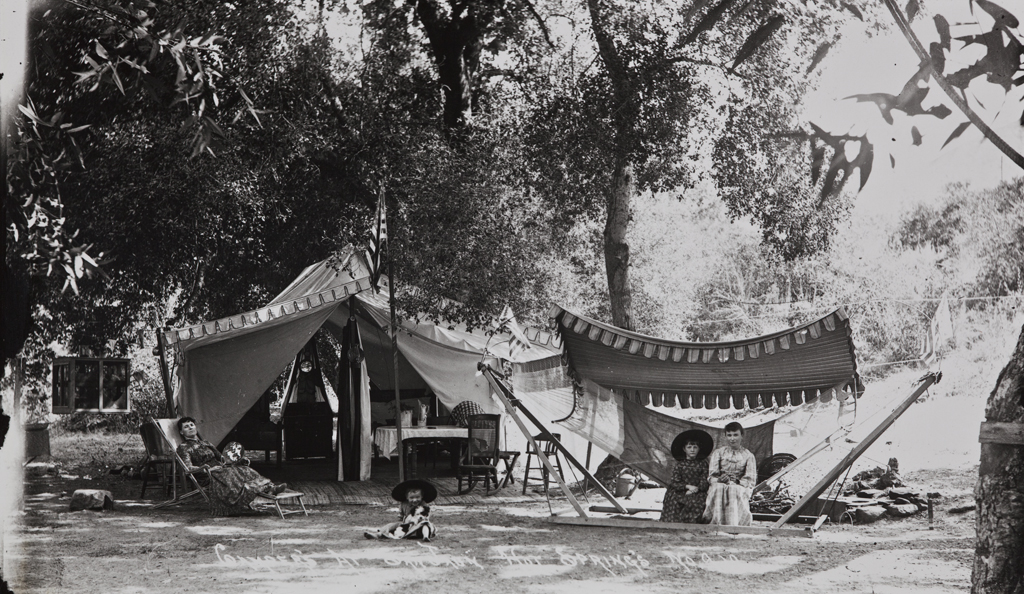
B.F. Conaway photograph of campers at San Juan Hot Springs in 1891 (Cal State Fullerton Special Collections)

The springs are located at about the halfway point on the route between the coast and Lake Elsinore. During the early settlement era, the springs were owned by ranchero Juan Forster, who "blocked development at the site to ensure access to the waters by Indians and other poor local residents." The land later became part of the O'Neill ranch and development began around 1885, when "two or three small buildings were constructed here, and the place also became a resort for campers as well as for the ailing".

A California guidebook first published in 1888 described the San Juan Springs as an important, albeit remote, destination for tourists:

For many years the San Juan hot springs have been noted for curing rheumatism and syphilis. They are sixty-five miles from Los Angeles, and there has been no railroad or hotel near them, yet people in great numbers are constantly making pilgrimages to this far-away place. There is no hotel, but the patients have tents or cheap houses to live in during their treatment. Mud baths are considered very efficacious, and, as there are no permanent buildings, these anxious seekers after health improvise mud bathing houses of a primitive type. There are over a dozen of these springs spread over an acre of ground, and another hot spring, known as McKnight's, a half-mile away. There are also cold springs near by...They are fourteen miles from San Juan-by-the-Sea. For the present, the best means to reach them is to San Juan-by-the-Sea by the California Central, and from there by team".

After the railroad came through, a regular stage operation from the train station to the springs was established in 1889, and the following year a dance hall and boarding house opened.

=== 20th century to present ===
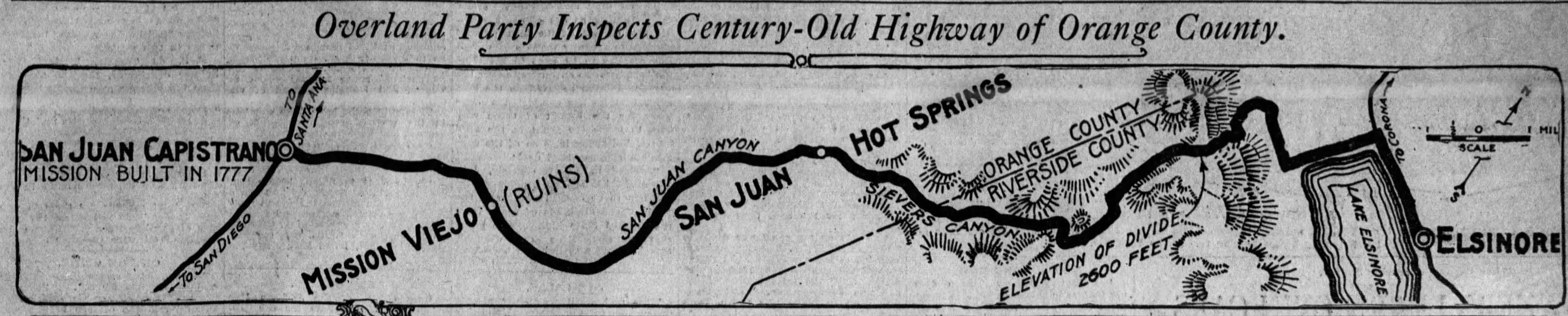
Map of route from San Juan Capistrano to Lake Elsinore, drawn 1914 by Orange County surveyor J. L. McBride for the Los Angeles Times

In 1907 a judge described the route:

One rides from Capistrano in the valley of San Juan creek for twelve miles amid a great variety of hill and plain, forest and field, running waters, clear and cool, the stream being crossed several times (the sand and gravel beds at the crossings making the sole exception to a good road) and the valley gradually narrowing till reaching here, where the principal springs are in the northwest side at an elevation of fifty to sixty feet or more above the creek bed...High up the southeast hillside is a spring of mineral water similar in its constituents to the hot, but water very cold.

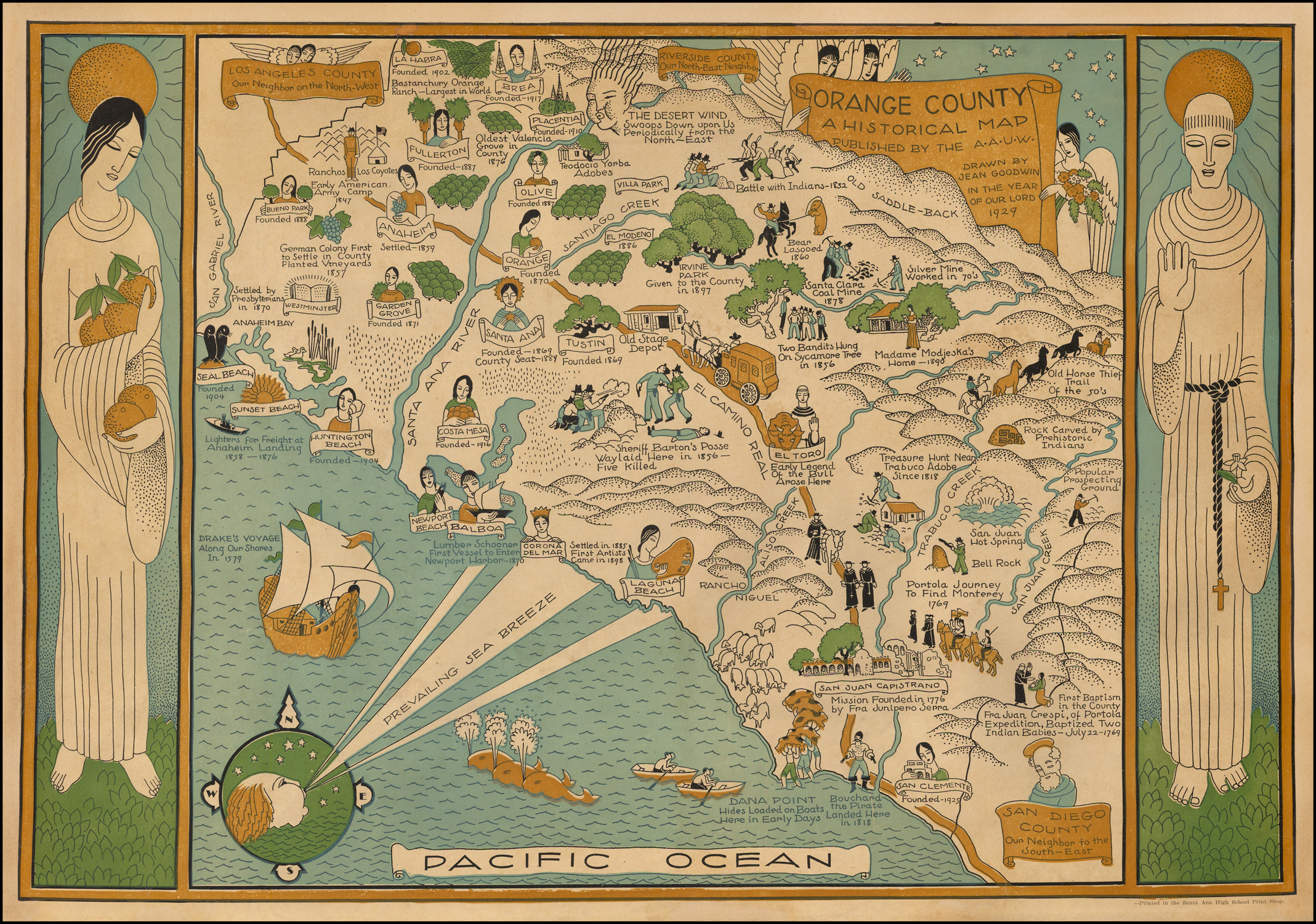
Historical map of Orange County by Jean Goodwin, 1929, showing San Juan Hot Springs (Barry J. Ruderman 46690)

Circa 1908, "improvements consisted of a small hotel, bathhouse, and three cottages. There are ample camp grounds, and the place has been used mainly as a camping resort". The first resort built at the site burned in 1910. By the 1920s, the resort had come into possession of one Leon Eyraud, at which time it was reportedly one of Orange County's most popular tourist destinations. The owners advertised the local hikes, and trout fishing in the nearby stream, and stated that "tubercular and other objectionable cases" would not be admitted. According to the Los Angeles Times per San Juan Capistrano historian Pamela Hallan-Gibson, "At one point, the springs had a large swimming pool and a store that sold wine, sandwiches and candy. People came from throughout Orange County for camping vacations that included card-playing, hunting and fishing." But the resort closed during the Great Depression in 1936, possibly because of health code issues or health concerns like epidemic polio, and stayed closed for decades. The dance hall from this era has been saved and was moved into town where it is used as a police substation. In 1938 plans to either turn the site into a retreat for sick children or to add the area to Cleveland National Forest were stalled by cost issues; the Forest Service's estimate of the land value was half of what the owners of Rancho Santa Margarita wanted for it.

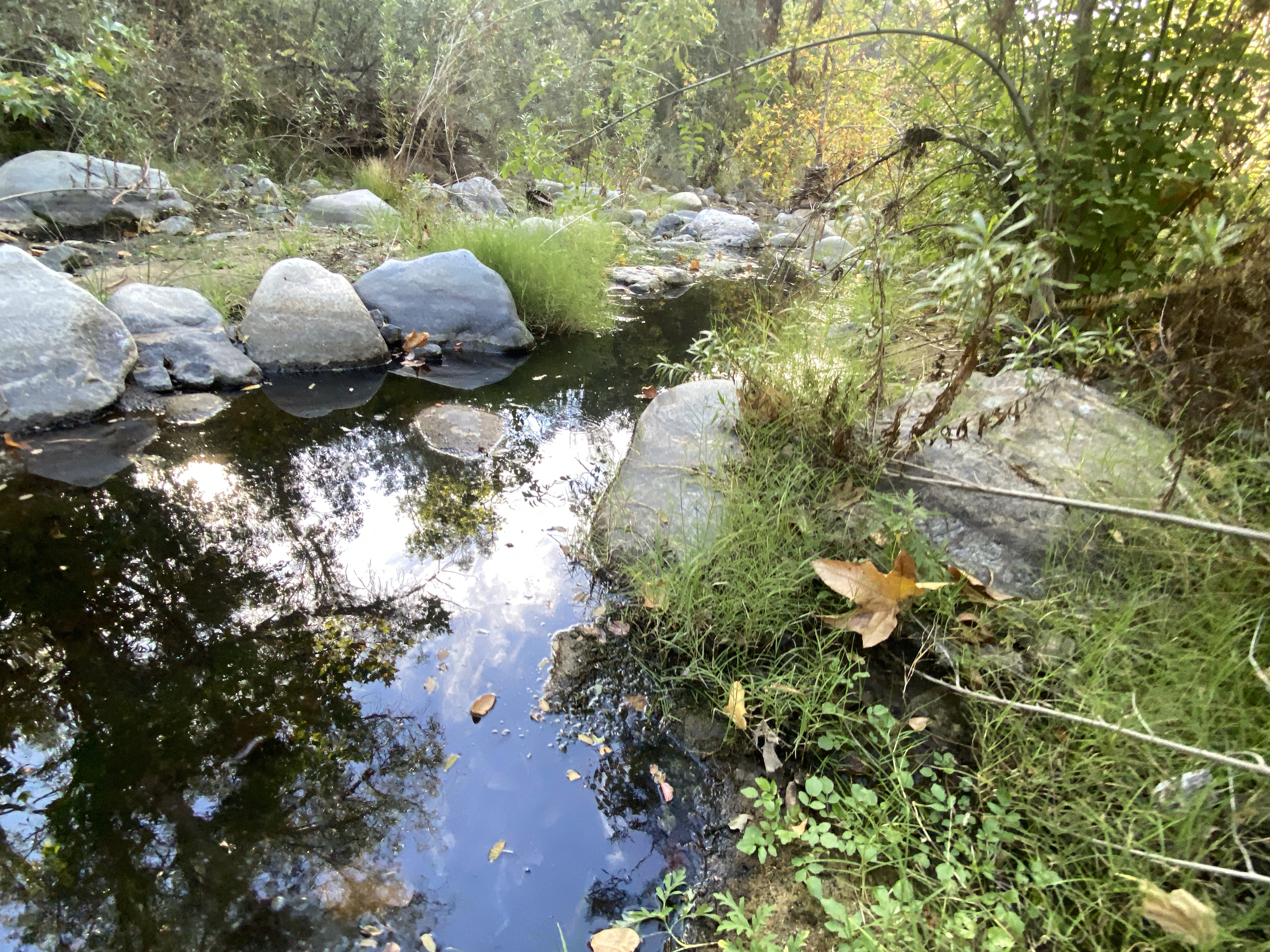
San Juan Creek near the hot springs (2023)

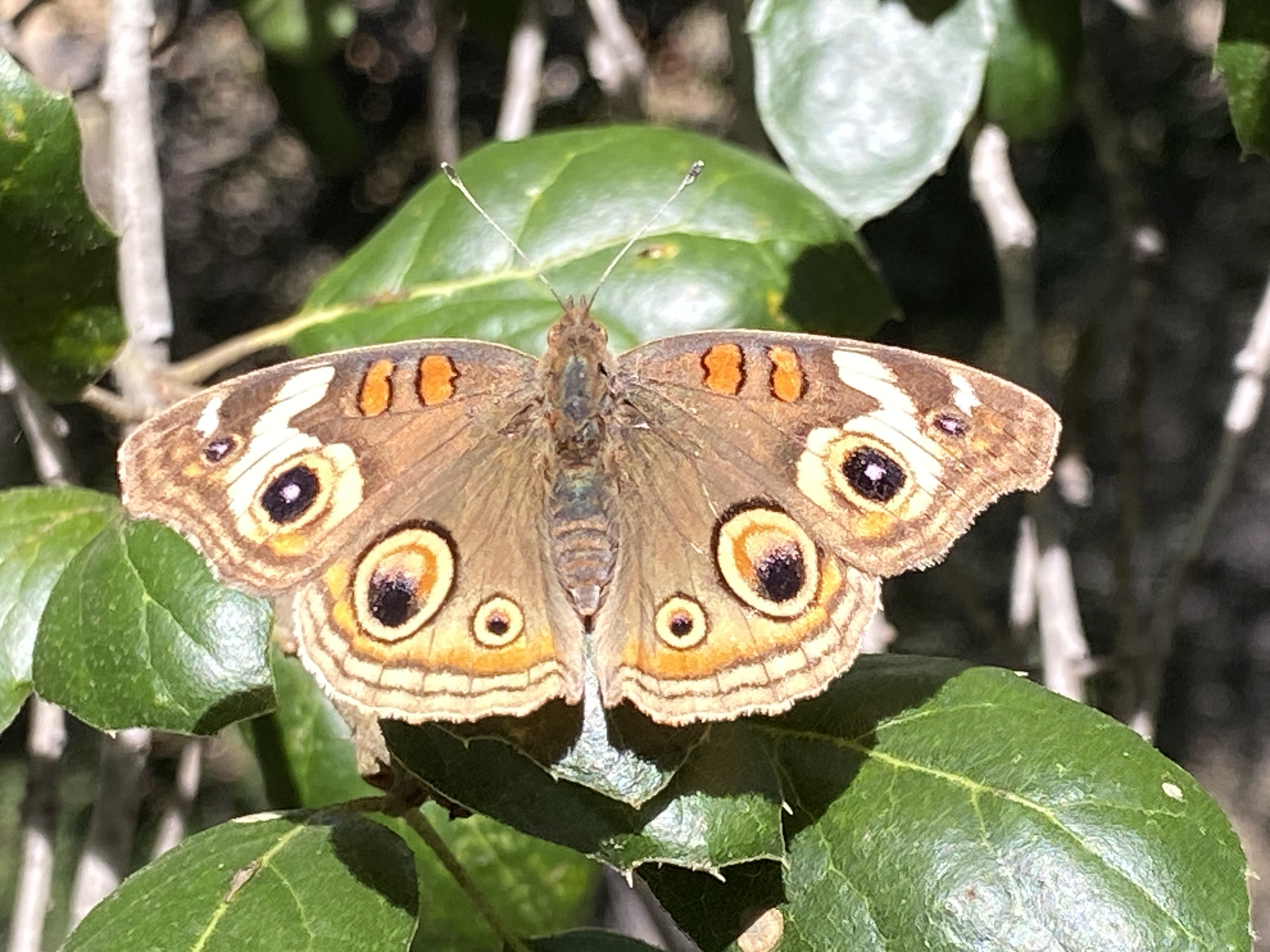
Gray buckeye on an oak tree near the springs

Nonetheless, the site remained an attractive destination and in the 1960s "became notorious as a hangout for hippie bathers, who were often arrested for trespassing and indecent exposure". A "commune" reportedly moved in, and in addition to public nudity, there were two murders and quite a bit of drug use. The Orange County Sheriff's Department was summoned on a regular basis. The old masonry tubs were eventually dynamited to discourage squatters, and the overflow re-routed to a ditch that drained into Hot Spring Creek (a tributary of San Juan Creek). During this era there were continuing but always unsuccessful efforts to add the springs to Cleveland National Forest. In 1974 the county put up a barricade around the springs to reduce visitor traffic, nudity, graffiti, etc.

The springs were reopened to the public by a county franchisee in 1981. In the 1980s the springs were said to be set in a grove of oaks, sycamore, and alder trees. Redwood soaking tubs set into the hillside used 16 of an estimated 52 spring vents. Rates were either hourly ($6.50 to $7.50 an hour, depending on the size of the tub), or daily, and the hot springs were open 24 hours, with a separate night rental fee. (It was $12.50 a day for overnight rental of a full-size teepee.) In 1989 the springs were designated an Orange County historic landmark.

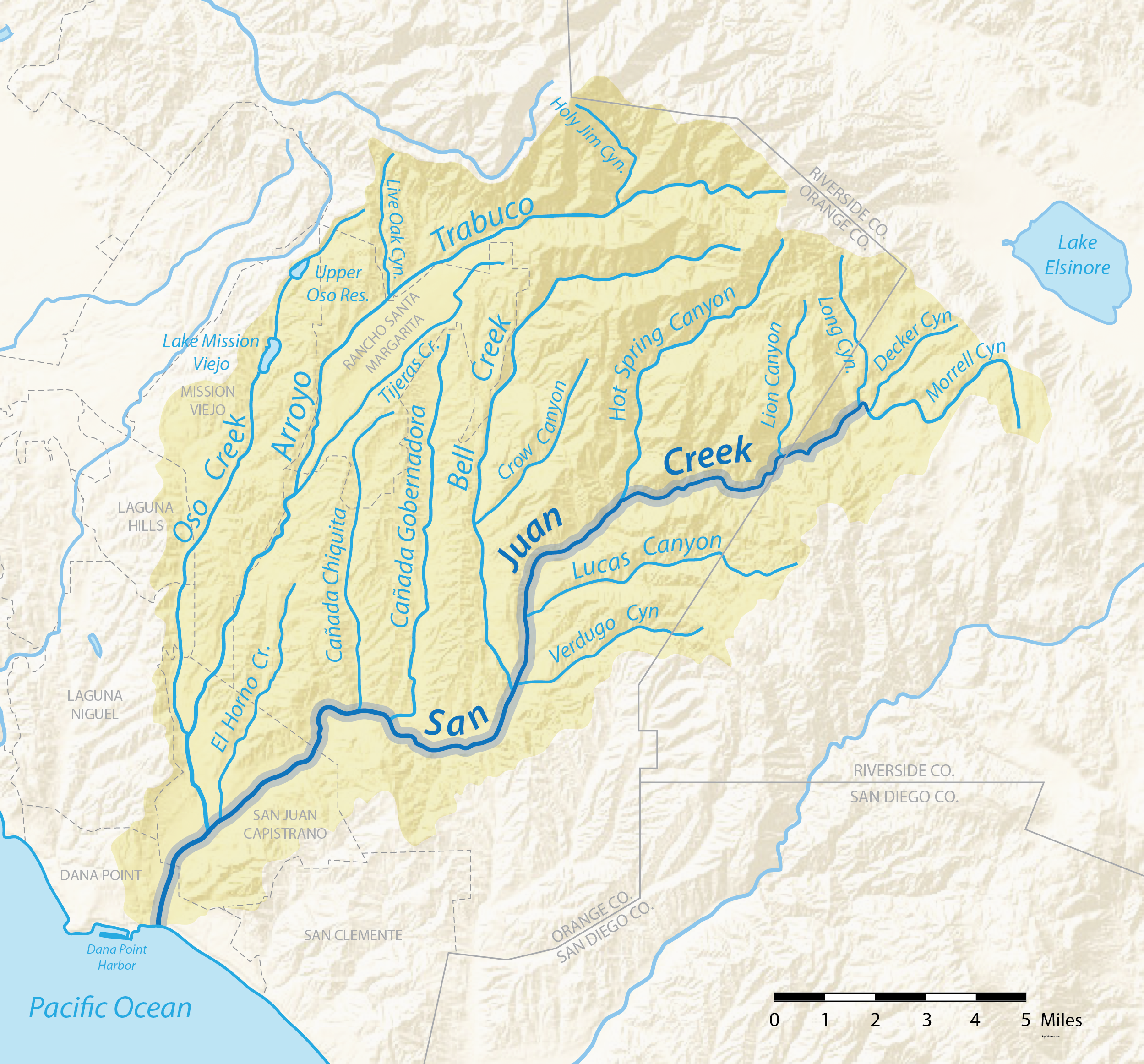
San Juan Creek watershed

The 17-acre (6.9 ha; 0.027 mi^{2}) resort shut down in 1992. According to the vendor who operated the resort, "When Caltrans in 1990 removed more than 100 trees, including 13 oaks and numerous sycamores and eucalyptus, to expand a bridge over Hot Spring Creek on Ortega Highway, it destroyed the ambience of the secluded hot springs." The county had also recently increased the monthly lease payment, there was a recession, and according to one official, consumer fears about AIDS transmission may have contributed to the resort's struggles. The 1993 Ortega Fire destroyed most of the amenities that had been built at the site.

The springs are now fenced off with barbed wire, but there is a picnic area across San Juan Creek that serves as a respite spot for hikers. Access from Ortega Highway has been blocked with gates, but there is a 13-mile (21 km) round-trip hike from the park entrance that routes past the springs. The gates are opened for rare naturalist-guided tours that are listed on the OCparks.com events calendar.

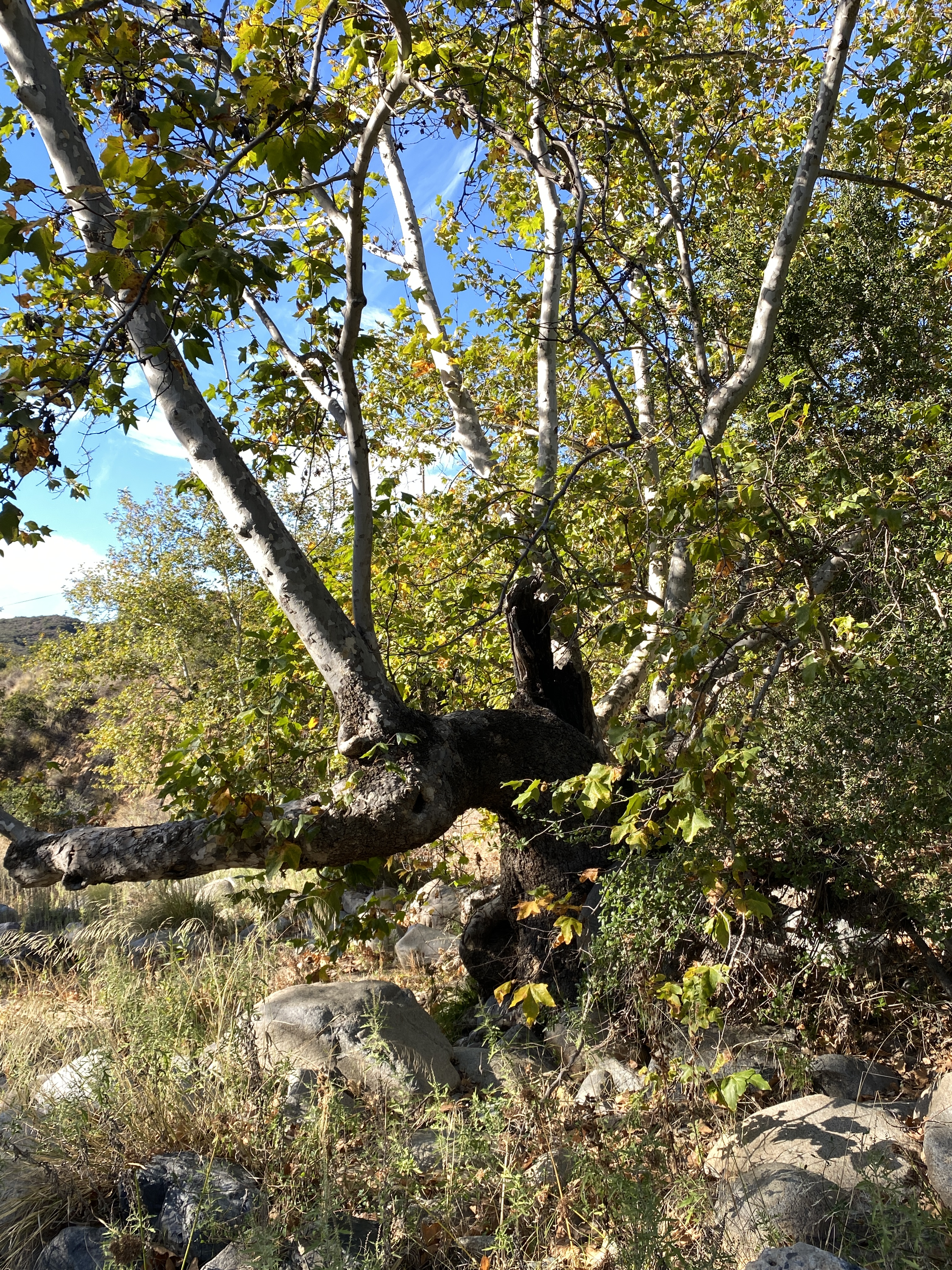
California sycamore that likely survived the 1993 wildfire

== Water profile ==
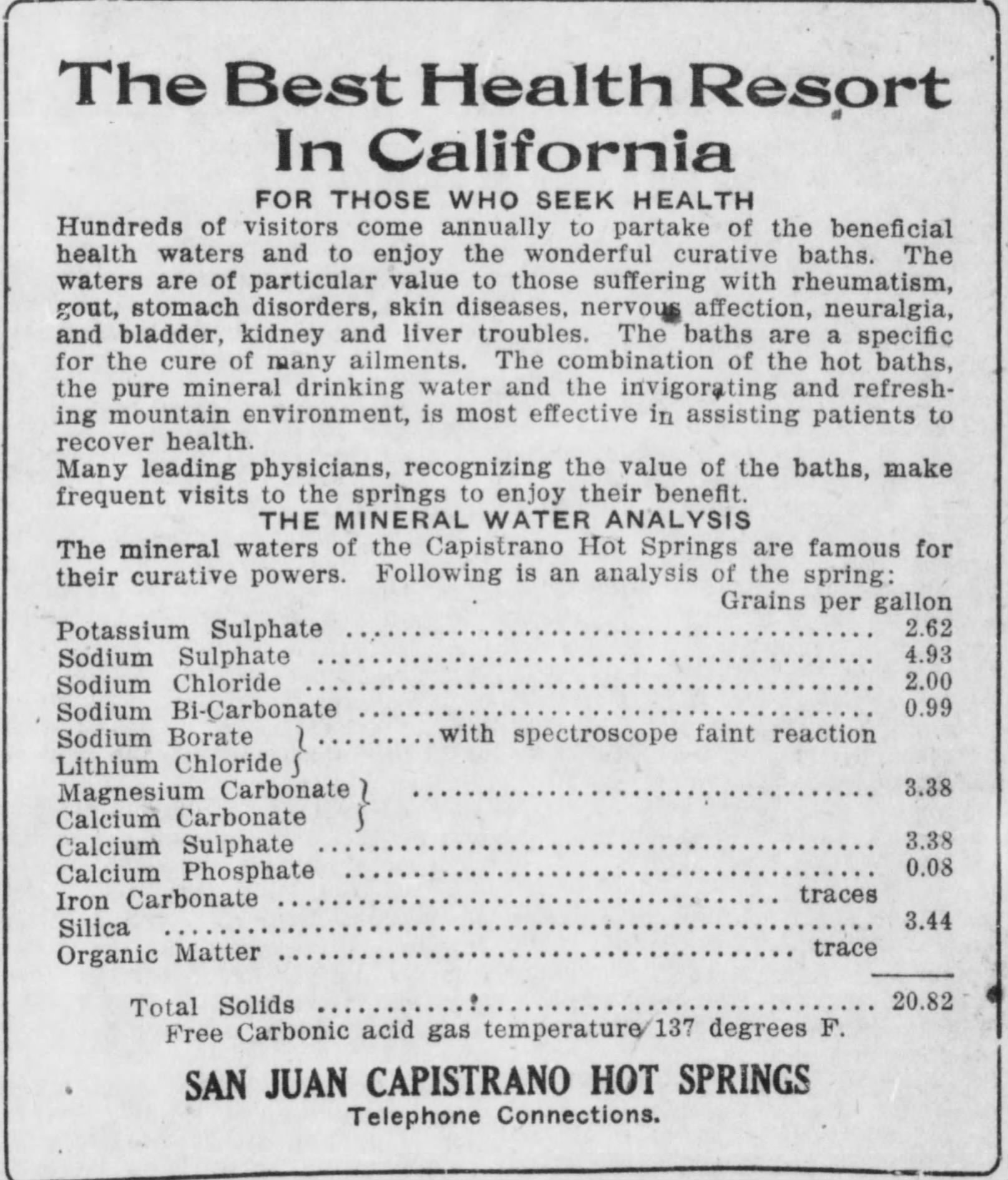
"The Best Health Resort in California" (The Register, October 5, 1920)

A 1888 California book reported the temperature of the hot springs was 135 °F (57 °C).

Per Waring in 1915, the water issues "from granitic rocks and near the base of the steeper slopes of a portion of the coastal ranges. Two main springs, four minor ones, and several marshy patches are here situated on the western side of the canyon on slopes near the creek. The highest temperature recorded was 124 °F (51 °C), along with a discharge rate of 35 US gallons (130 L; 29 imp gal) a minute. Other warm springs issue in a canyon half a mile westward. The water is slightly sulphureted, but, like the other hot waters of this region, it is not highly mineralized. The analysis indicates a slightly mineralized soft water, primary alkaline saline in character."

In 1980, NOAA measured the temperature at 120 °F (49 °C), That temperature held steady, as in 1992, the water was reported to be 120 °F (49 °C) upon emergence and flow at 50 US gallons (190 L; 42 imp gal) a minute.

== See also ==
- Course of San Juan Creek
- Fairview Hot Springs
- Guadalupe Canyon Hot Springs
- List of hot springs in the United States § California
- Ranchos of Orange County
