= Trampas =

Trampas may refer to:

== People ==
- Trampas Parker (b. 1967), American professional motocross racer
- Trampas Whiteman (b. 1972), American writer and game designer
- Trampas, a fictional character in The Virginian, an American western TV series

== Places ==
- Trampas, or Las Trampas, an unincorporated town in New Mexico, United States

== See also ==
- Trampas Canyon, a river in California, United States
