= El Horno Creek =

Tributary of San Juan Creek in Orange County, California

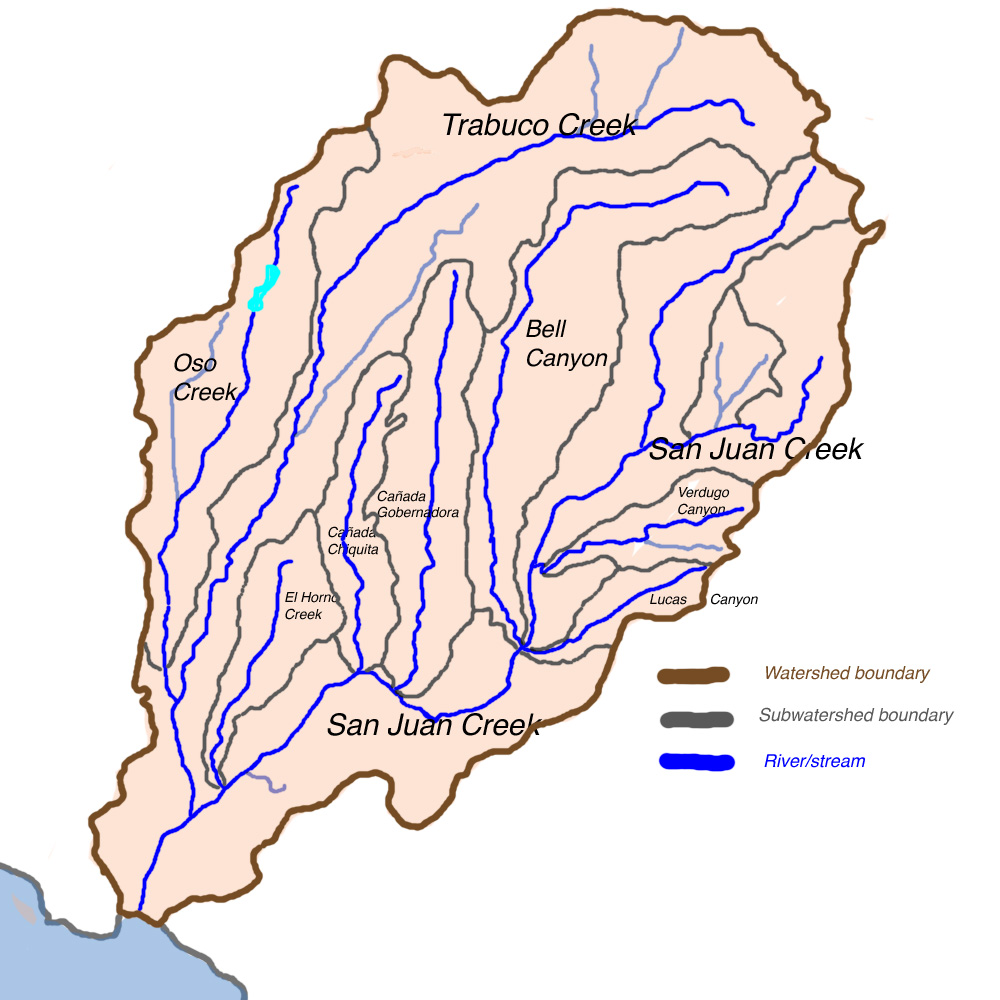
Stream map of San Juan Creek watershed with three major tributaries in dark blue, smaller streams in light blue, and cities and towns in orange. El Horno Creek is the creek closest to the San Juan-Trabuco confluence, in light blue, flowing southwards into San Juan Creek.

El Horno Creek, or Horno Creek (Spanish: "Oven Creek"), is a tributary stream of San Juan Creek in Orange County in the U.S. state of California. It is approximately 5.9 miles (9.5 km) long and drains an area of 4.3 square miles (11 km^{2}). The creek joins San Juan Creek on the right bank, only a few hundred yards upstream of the Trabuco Creek confluence, within the city limits of San Juan Capistrano.

The creek begins in the foothills of the Santa Ana Mountains (33.5672464°N 117.6300495°W), in the mostly residential CDP of Ladera Ranch. The headwaters of the creek were formerly divided into two canyons, but during the development of Ladera Ranch starting in the late 1990s, the area was regraded, and the headwaters were combined into a single 2.4-mile (3.9 km) channel. The creek flows southwest through a small flood control dam and into San Juan Capistrano, where it crosses under Interstate 5 and turns south, bisecting San Juan Elementary School. Shortly past the school, the creek enters an underground concrete channel passing under the I-5/CA 74 interchange and flows into San Juan Creek at (33.4978044°N 117.6553283°W).

Although significant stretches of the creek remain above ground, riparian habitat along the creek remains "sporadic" despite its perennial flow, mainly due to pollution from stormwater.
