= Horno Creek =

River in southern California, USA

Horno Creek Horno Canyon

Location
- Country: United States
- State: California
- Region: San Diego County

Physical characteristics
- Source: source
  - location: at the top of Horno Canyon, east of San Onofre Mountain, San Diego County
  - coordinates: 33°21′56″N 117°27′52″W
  - elevation: 840 ft (260 m)
- Mouth: mouth
  - location: at its confluence with Pacific Ocean within the Marine Corps Base Camp Pendleton., San Diego County
  - coordinates: 33°19′22″N 117°29′42″W
  - elevation: 0 ft (0 m)

Basin features
- River system: Pacific Ocean

Horno Creek is a creek that empties into the Pacific Ocean through Horno Canyon on the coast of northern San Diego County, California, USA, on the Marine Corps Base Camp Pendleton. It lies south of Foley Creek and north of Las Flores Creek.
