= Trampas Canyon =

Trampas Canyon Creek
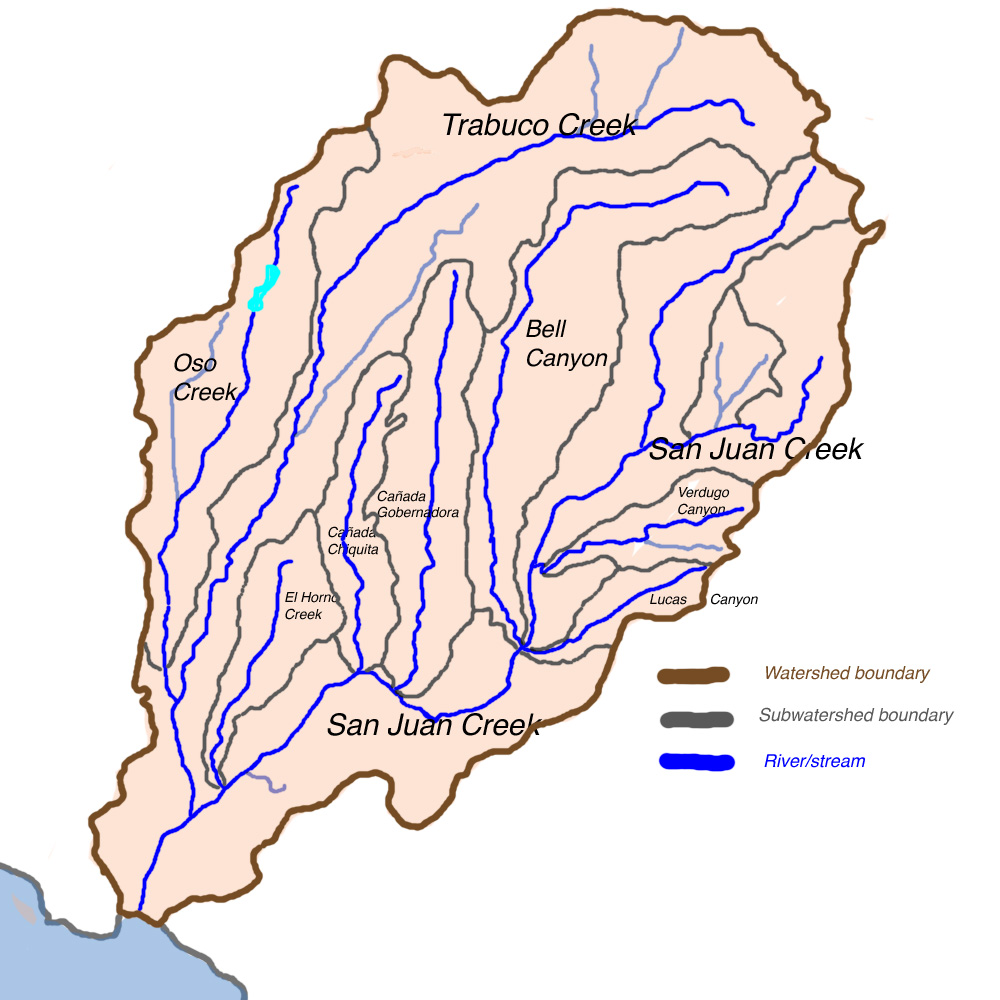
- Stream map of San Juan Creek watershed with three major tributaries in dark blue, smaller streams in light blue, and cities and towns in orange. Trampas Canyon Creek is the short waterway flowing north into San Juan Creek, near the lower edge of the map.

Location
- Country: United States
- State: California
- District: Orange County

Physical characteristics
- Source: Trampas Canyon Reservoir near Santa Ana Mountains
  - coordinates: 33.4883597°N 117.5933813°W
  - elevation: 800 ft (240 m)
- Mouth: San Juan Creek
  - coordinates: 33.5147478°N 117.5828254°W
  - elevation: 272 ft (83 m)
- Length: 0.8 mi (1.3 km)

Basin features
- River system: San Juan Creek

Trampas Canyon is a short tributary of San Juan Creek in southern Orange County the U.S. state of California. It rises in forks on steep slopes of the southern Santa Ana Mountains (33.4883597°N 117.5933813°W), and flows north to where it is dammed by Trampas Canyon Dam (USGS San Clemente Quad 7½"). Trampas Canyon 1795-006 Dam (33.498359°N 117.587548°W) forms a small lake that branches into four forks running east–west. Exiting the dam, the creek flows north and turns slightly to the west, where it joins San Juan Creek on the left bank, near the confluence of Cañada Gobernadora (33.3053°N 117.3458°W). Trampas Canyon Creek is ephemeral and only flows during storm events or while Trampas Canyon Dam is releasing, and is not a primary tributary of San Juan Creek.

A study was prepared in 1999 by the City of San Juan Capistrano, and it was found that a failure of the earthen Trampas Canyon Dam would do more damage to the lower course of San Juan Creek than for a 100 year flood. A failure would cause a floodwave over 0.5 miles (0.80 km) wide to rush down the lower 4.7 miles (7.6 km) of San Juan Creek to Doheny State Beach, flooding parts of San Juan Capistrano and Dana Point. A 100-year flood would cause a slightly smaller inundation.
