= Cañada Gobernadora =

Tributary in California

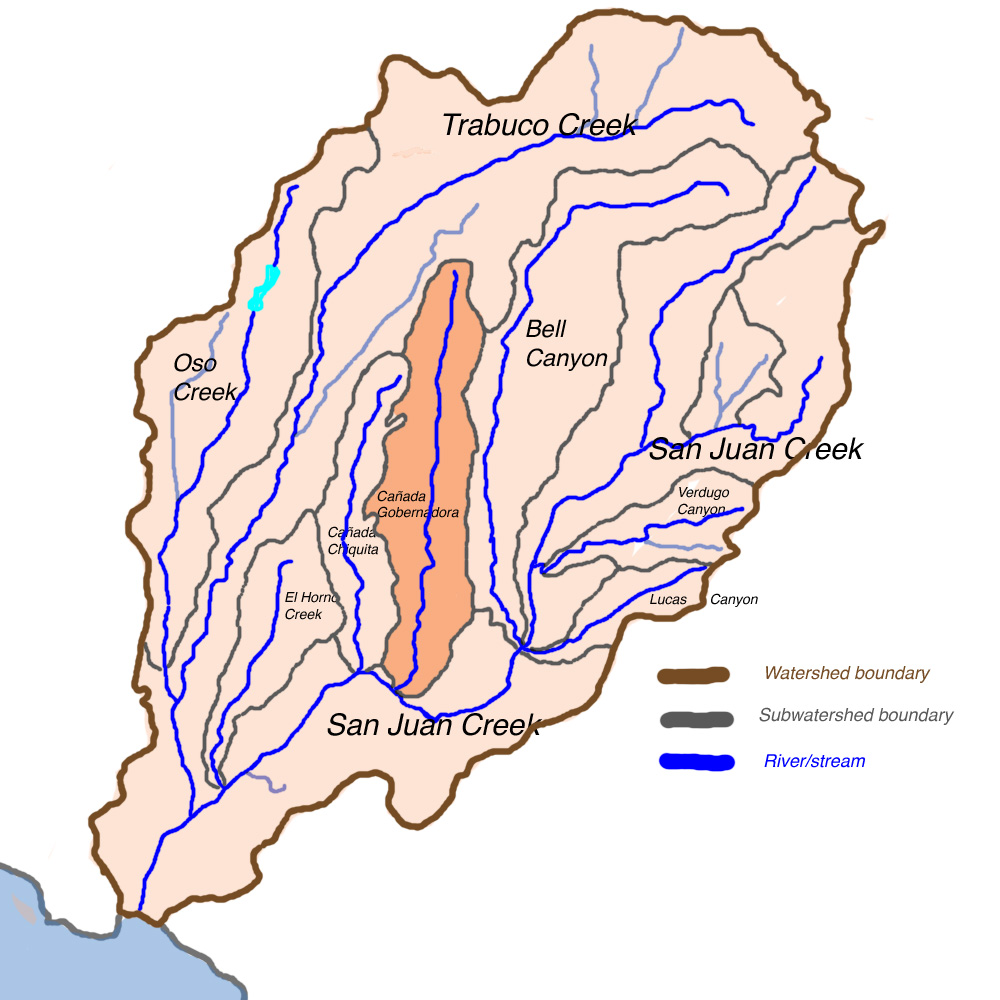
Map of San Juan Creek watershed with Cañada Gobernadora sub-basin highlighted

Cañada Gobernadora is a tributary to San Juan Creek, about 8.5 miles (13.7 km) long, in southern Orange County in the U.S. state of California. The creek begins in the foothills of the Santa Ana Mountains (33.6402995°N 117.5794921°W), at an elevation of 1,040 feet (320 m), and flows south through residential, agricultural and finally undeveloped land, to its confluence with San Juan Creek a few miles upstream of the city of San Juan Capistrano (33.5233587°N 117.5981038°W). The upper half of the stream is largely channelized and flows through golf courses, while the lower half is a wash-like channel that can be up to 700 feet (200 m) wide. The stream receives some urban runoff from the residential communities higher in its watershed. The watershed includes several geologic formations, including the Tertiary Sespe Formation and Santiago Formation, and Holocene sedimentary and alluvial deposits embedded in its narrow floodplain. Cañada Gobernadora forms an unofficial dividing line for the lower portion of the San Juan watershed; most urban development is confined to west of the creek's valley, while agricultural and undeveloped lands lie to the east of the creek.

Historically, the Cañada Gobernadora valley was inhabited by the Acjachemen Native Americans who had two villages on the creek, Huumai, in the upper areas of the creek, and Piwiva, which was at the confluence with San Juan Creek. This latter village became a proposed site for Mission San Juan Capistrano before it was built in the city of the same name. The name of the creek means "Canyon of the Governor's Wife" in Spanish. A less commonly used name refers to greasewood, which was once abundant in the Cañada Gobernadora watershed. The upper watershed of the creek is now mostly occupied by suburban residential communities, and the middle and lower portions are given primarily to agriculture.
