= San Mateo Creek (Southern California) =

San Mateo Creek Arroyo de San Mateo, Rio San Mateo
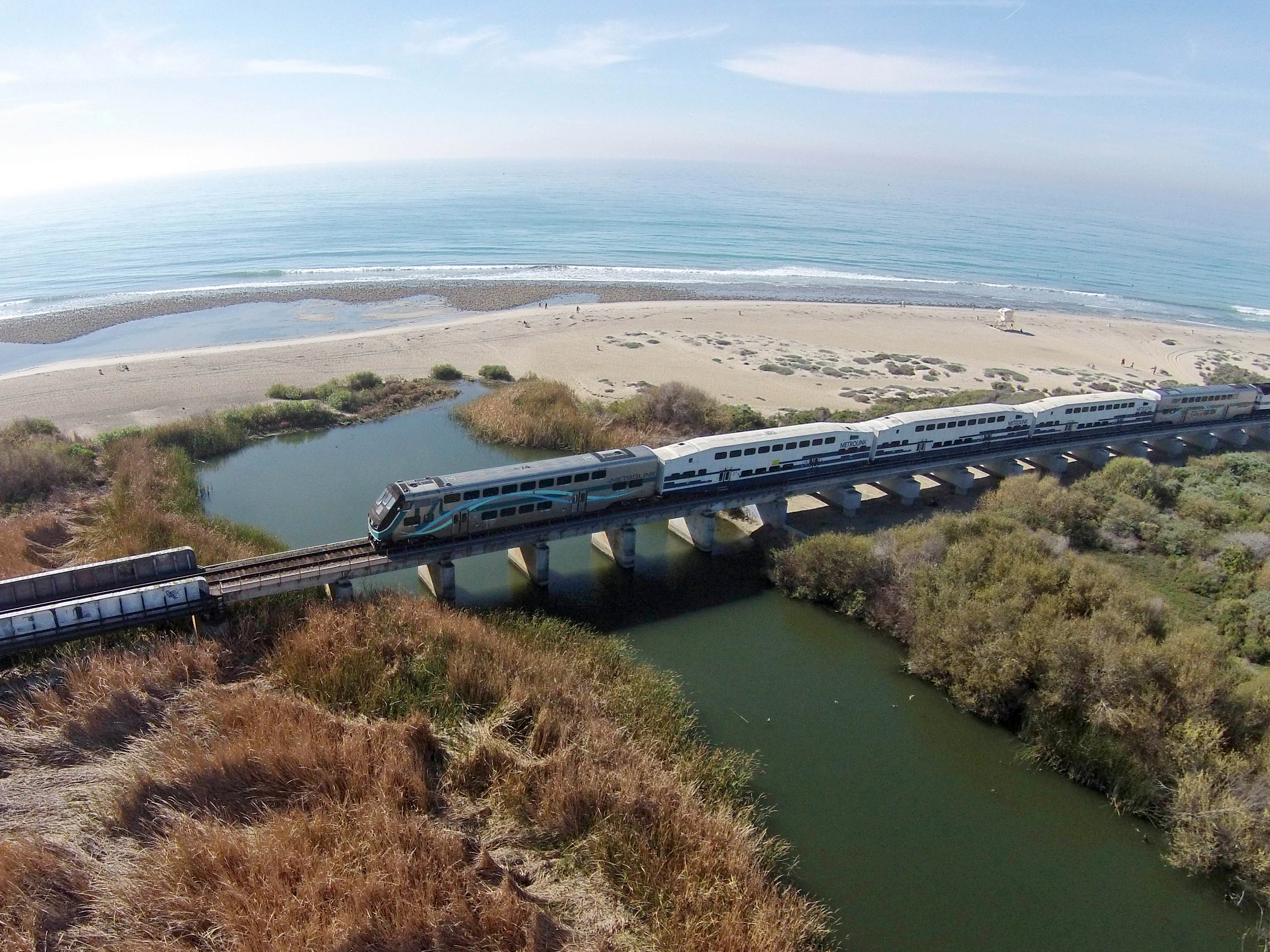
- San Mateo Creek Lagoon at the mouth

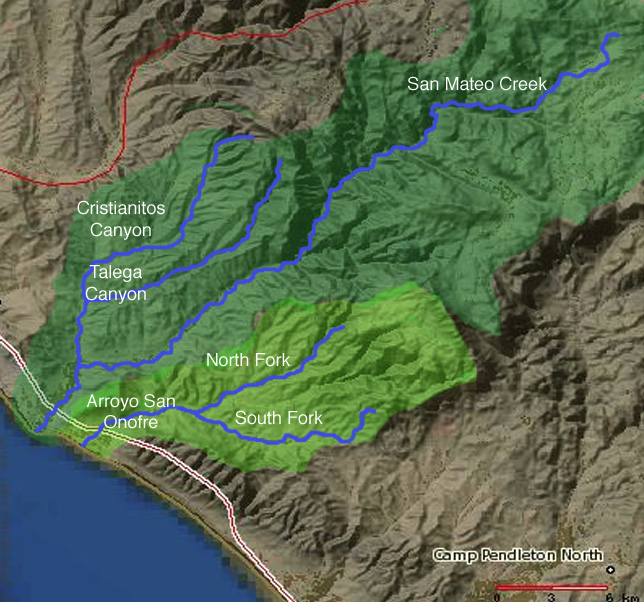
- Map of San Mateo Creek and Arroyo San Onofre drainage basins. San Mateo Creek basin is in dark green.

Location
- Country: United States
- State: California
- Region: San Diego County, Riverside County
- District: Marine Corps Base Camp Pendleton

Physical characteristics
- Source: canyon on the west face of San Mateo Peak
  - location: Elsinore Mountains, within the Santa Ana Mountains, Cleveland National Forest, Riverside County, California, United States
  - coordinates: 33°37′12″N 117°23′17″W
  - elevation: 2,800 ft (850 m)
- Mouth: San Mateo Creek (Southern California)
  - location: Pacific Ocean, San Onofre State Beach, San Diego County
  - coordinates: 33°23′05″N 117°35′34″W
  - elevation: 0 ft (0 m)
- Length: 22 mi (35 km)
- Basin size: 139 sq mi (360 km^{2})
- Discharge
  - location: San Clemente
  - average: 12.1 cu ft/s (0.34 m^{3}/s)
  - minimum: 0 cu ft/s (0 m^{3}/s)
  - maximum: 12,500 cu ft/s (350 m^{3}/s)

Basin features
- Tributaries
  - left: Los Alamos Canyon Creek, Tenaja Canyon Creek, Devil Canyon Creek
  - right: Bluewater Canyon Creek, Nickel Canyon Creek, Cristianitos Creek

San Mateo Creek is a stream in Southern California in the United States, whose watershed mostly straddles the border of Orange and San Diego Counties. It is about 22 miles (35 km) long, flowing in a generally southwesterly direction. Draining a broad valley bounded by the Santa Ana Mountains and Santa Margarita Mountains, San Mateo Creek is notable for being one of the last unchannelized streams in Southern California.

One of the least developed watersheds on the South Coast, San Mateo Creek's drainage basin covers 139 square miles (360 km^{2}) in parts of the Cleveland National Forest and Marine Corps Base Camp Pendleton. The first inhabitants were Native Americans primarily of the Acjachemen and Luiseño groups, followed by the Spanish who established ranchos in the area. The creek's usually perennial flow made it an important source of irrigation water, then in the later 19th century, there was a gold rush in the upper watershed. Most of the little development in the watershed was agriculture-based.

The San Mateo Creek watershed includes the subwatersheds of Los Alamos Canyon Creek, Tenaja Canyon Creek, Devil Canyon Creek and Cristianitos Creek with its tributaries of Talega and Gabino Creeks. Although grazing activities have hurt the biological quality of the semi-arid, Mediterranean-climate watershed, it still supports numerous biological communities including riparian zones, grassland and coastal sage scrub. A population of steelhead trout was identified in the creek in 2007, which population is adversely affected by continuing groundwater pumping, and which also may have been minimally impacted by minor agricultural runoff prior to cessation of farming activities along the stream aboard Marine Corps Base Camp Pendleton.

== Course ==
The 22-mile (35 km)-long San Mateo Creek begins its course in a canyon in the extreme southeastern end of the Santa Ana Mountains, which lie mostly in Riverside County. From there, the creek continues through a steep and narrow gorge for the first part of its course, then a broad and shallower valley for the second part. It receives four major tributaries and many smaller ones on its generally southwest journey to the Pacific Ocean.

San Mateo Creek has its source, at an elevation of 2800 feet, in the canyon on the west face of the unofficially named 3,591 ft. San Mateo Peak, at the western end of the ridge running west then northwest from Elsinore Peak to Morrell Canyon, south and west of the Morrell Potrero in the Elsinore Mountains. From its headwaters south of Lake Elsinore inside the Cleveland National Forest, San Mateo Creek runs southwards through the valley of the old Rancho at the Potrero de la Cienaga which as its name suggests feeds the creek with several springs. The canyon widens and deepens until it is roughly 600 feet (180 m) in depth. After running south for several miles it turns southeast to the Tenaja Falls where it tumbles down to its confluence with Los Alamos Canyon Creek, that comes in from the left. This creek with its tributary Wildhorse Canyon Creek and two unnamed arroyos drain the southern slopes of Elsinore Peak. Another unnamed arroyo drains the western Santa Rosa Plateau and the east slope of the Tenaja Mountain highland and descends to the north to join the creek where it turns to the west.

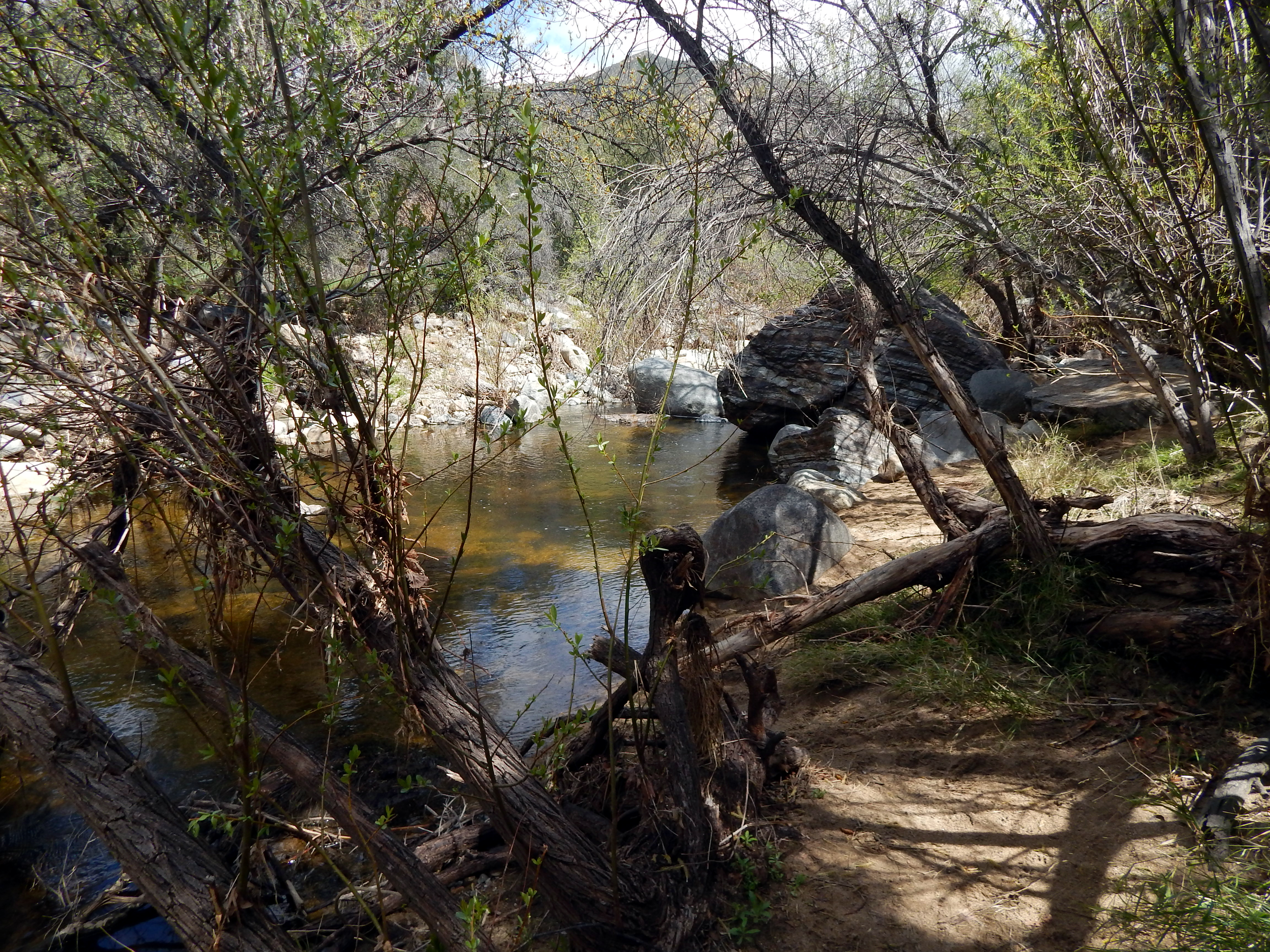
San Mateo Creek at Tenaja Truck Trail crossing near Tenaja Falls Trailhead

From its confluence with Los Alamos Canyon Creek, San Mateo Creek turns its course southwest down San Mateo Canyon, cutting a deep arid canyon surrounded by slopes dissected by many side canyons between the Santa Ana and Santa Margarita Mountains. At river mile (RM) 18 or river kilometer (RK) 28.9, Tenaja Canyon Creek, which flows generally northwest, comes in from the left. Shortly after, at RM 17.5 (RK 28.1) Bluewater Canyon Creek descends from Sitton Peak, to merge with San Mateo Canyon from the right. Nickel Canyon Creek also comes in from the right, descending from the Verdugo Potrero shortly afterward, joining San Mateo Creek just north of the Riverside – San Diego County line.

The creek then continues to flow southwards and Devil Canyon Creek draining the eastern slope of the Santa Margarita Mountains with its tributary, Cold Spring Canyon Creek, comes in from the left at RM 15 (RK 24.1). The Devil Canyon Creek confluence approximately marks the point where San Mateo Creek leaves the Cleveland National Forest. Soon, the narrow 2,500-foot (760 m)-deep canyon gives way to a broad alluvial valley. San Mateo Creek flows past Camp Pendleton, a United States Marine Corps amphibious training base. At RM 3.7 (RK 5.95) Cristianitos Creek, the largest tributary, joins from the right. Cristianitos Creek begins in extreme southeastern Orange County and drains about 29 square miles (75 km^{2}), that includes its tributaries of Talega Canyon Creek and Gabino Canyon Creek and its tributary La Paz Canyon Creek that enter it from the left.

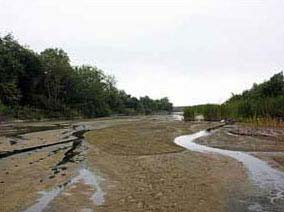
Lagoon at termination

San Mateo Creek then crosses under Interstate 5 and the Trestles Bridge which carries the Surf Line and empties into a small, perennial freshwater lagoon bounded by a sandbar at San Onofre State Beach. The lagoon only empties into the sea during the rainy season. This portion of the creek is very close to San Clemente and a small residential area is just to the northeast side of the lagoon. The lagoon remains similar to its natural state as well, although it is increasingly becoming harmed by unnatural pollutants.

== Geologic history ==
Geologically the San Mateo Creek watershed is dominated by the Santa Ana Mountains, whose underlying bedrock consists of Jurassic-age igneous and sedimentary rock, overlain by a few thousand vertical feet of Cretaceous-age granite, gabbro, and tonalite. Underneath the San Mateo Creek valley's several hundred feet of alluvial deposits, there are layers of sandstone, limestone, siltstone, mudstone, shale and conglomerate. These formations are present along most of the streams draining off the west slope of the Santa Ana Mountains and are practically identical as far north as Santiago Creek, which is in north-central Orange County nearly 50 miles (80 km) away.

The alluvial deposits originate from the Wisconsinian glaciation, in which massive glaciers and ice sheets advanced over much of North America and shifted the global climate. During this roughly 60,000-year-long period that ended in approximately 8000 B.C., Southern California received up to 80 inches (2,000 mm) of rainfall per year, and this radical climate change coincided with a 300-to-400-foot (91 to 122 m) drop in sea level. As the sea levels fell, streams flowing into the Pacific from Southern California began to erode massive canyons in their floodplains.

The rivers eventually eroded to 400 feet (120 m) or so below their previous elevation. When the Wisconsinian period ended, sea level rose, filled these canyons and turned them into long, narrow inlets. Because the heavy rains ceased with the departure of the Wisconsinian, the rivers and streams once again became slow-flowing. Over the course of thousands of years, these calm inlets gradually filled with alluvial sediments, giving them the flat valley floors they have today. Over time, sea level dropped slightly again, allowing the rivers to once again entrench channels into their floodplains, resulting in the broad river terraces that line much of lower San Mateo Creek, Arroyo San Onofre and San Juan Creek.

=== Soils ===
Most of the soils in the San Mateo Creek drainage area are loamy, well-drained and also fertile in the lowlands. In the mountains the soil cover is very shallow and there are many exposed cliffs, large boulders and outcroppings of sedimentary rock. In the lower watershed are sandy or silty loams which have a clay substructure. These soils are classified as highly fertile and there are a few farms on the foothills and the floodplain of the San Mateo Creek watershed.

== Watershed ==
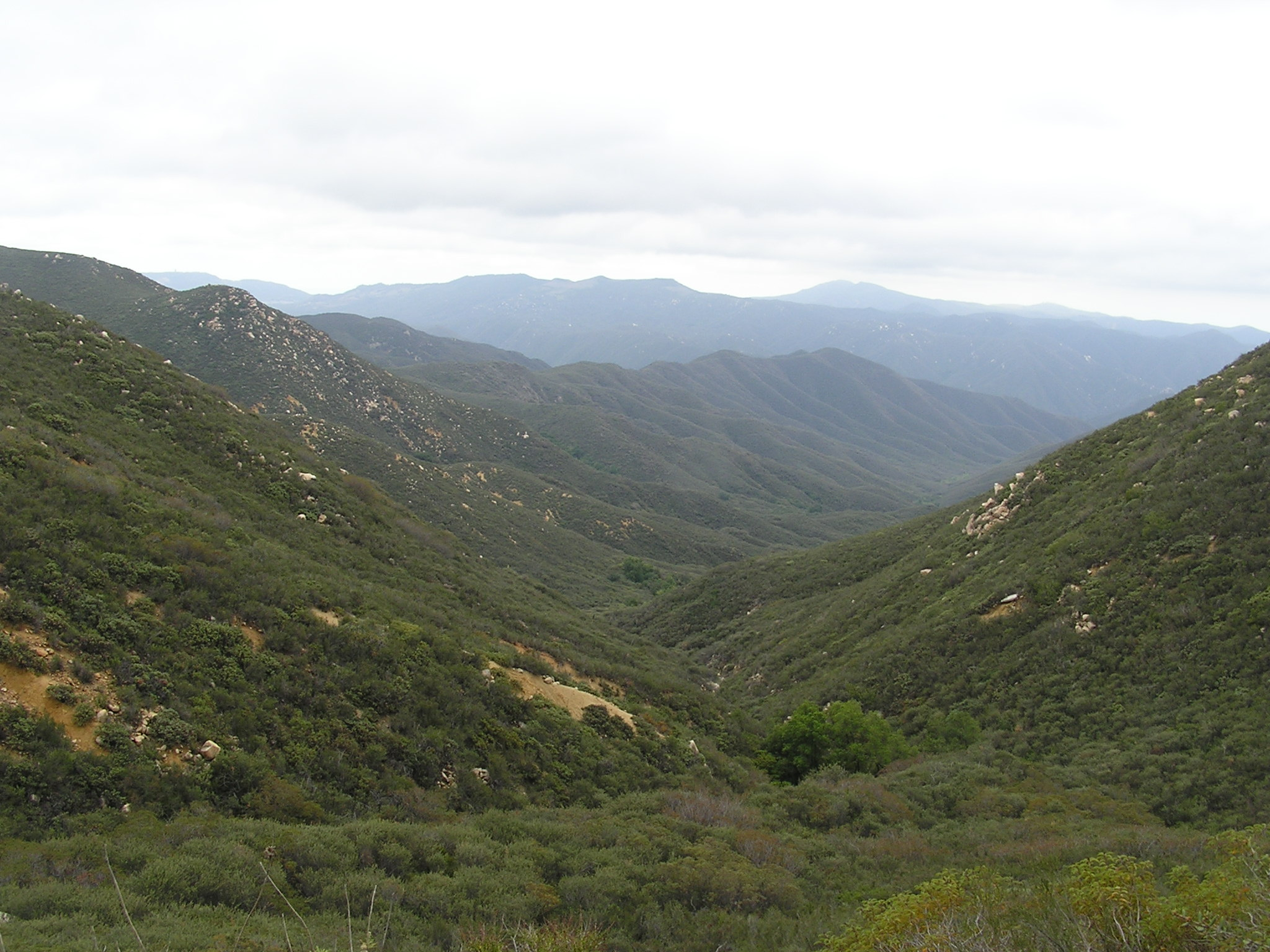
San Mateo Canyon Wilderness in the northwest upper basin

The San Mateo Creek drainage basin covers 139 square miles (360 km^{2}) mostly in San Diego County and partially in Orange County. It shares boundaries with several watersheds – including Segunda Deshecha Cañada to the west, Arroyo San Onofre to the southeast, and streams draining into Lake Elsinore in the northeast. It is slightly larger than the 133.9-square-mile (347 km^{2}) San Juan Creek watershed, which borders on the San Mateo Creek watershed's northeastern side.

The upper reaches of the watershed consist primarily of canyons that are 200 to 2,500 feet (61 to 762 m) deep and 0.5 to 1 mile (0.80 to 1.61 km) broad, while the lower watershed is a valley 2.5 to 3 miles (4.0 to 4.8 km) wide and less than 1,000 feet (300 m) deep. The largest tributary of San Mateo Creek is Cristianitos Creek (in Christianitos Canyon), which is about 10 miles (16 km) long and with its tributaries, drains 29 square miles (75 km^{2}) in the western portion of the watershed with a portion in Orange County. Other significant sub-basins in the watershed include Talega Canyon, La Paz Creek and Gabino Creek, all of which are tributaries of Cristianitos Canyon.

The Santa Ana Mountains form the drainage divide with San Juan Creek on the northwest side of the San Mateo Creek valley, and the Santa Margarita Mountains on the southeast separate San Mateo Creek from the Arroyo San Onofre, a creek that drains westwards to the Pacific Ocean. Arroyo San Onofre is also the closest major stream to San Mateo Creek by location of the mouth. The next closest is Segunda Deshecha Cañada, further north. Much of the upper San Mateo Creek watershed is encompassed by the central Cleveland National Forest and the lower lies mostly within Camp Pendleton. The closest city is San Clemente, northwest of the creek's mouth.

San Mateo Creek was once a seasonal stream that would flow through the rainy season, run dry by June or July and restart in October. Although springs exist in the mountains, once the creek spilled onto its floodplain, it would seep into the ground and run in a subsurface manner. Irrigation return flows and a sewage treatment plant have increased its flows to perennial, although it does not receive as much runoff as most other Southern California streams. The typical annual peak flow is around 2,760 cubic feet per second (78 m^{3}/s), while the 2-year flood is 3,200 cubic feet per second (91 m^{3}/s), the 10-year event, 19,160 cubic feet per second (543 m^{3}/s), and the 100-year flood, 47,530 cubic feet per second (1,346 m^{3}/s).

== Ecology ==
=== Plants ===
Supporting a highly productive ecosystem, the San Mateo Creek watershed includes a high variety of elevations and vegetation groups. These include riparian zones and woodlands around the perennial or semi-perennial streams, grassland on the valley floors, and chaparral and coastal sage scrub on the hillsides. Overall the vegetation groups and their distribution are very similar to that of San Juan Creek and its major tributary, Trabuco Creek, in the northwest. The major difference is that the San Mateo Creek watershed contains no major residential areas.

The mouth of the creek and its last reaches shortly above and below Camp Pendleton are host to a wide variety of riparian plants. At the mouth, there is a freshwater lagoon and several freshwater marshes, surrounded by a riparian woodland consisting primarily of willow, sycamore, live oak and cottonwood. Surrounding the lower San Mateo Creek valley and on the shallow slopes is the coastal sage scrub community, which consist primarily of coast goldenbush, coyote brush, California sagebrush, mulefat, toyon, poison oak, laurel sumac, California mugwort, Mexican elderberry, and California encelia. At the very mouth, where groundwater surfaces on the streambed, there are the stands of trees, and undergrowth includes wild cucumber and gooseberry.

Freshwater marshes surrounding San Mateo Creek exist in a strip just a few hundred feet wide and draw their water supply primarily from emerging groundwater. The most prominent plants are bulrush, specifically California bulrush, and cattail. There are also several species of burweeds and ferns, and on the edges of the marshes and on the surrounding small meadows, goldenrod, hedge-nettle, fleshy jaumea, Mexican rush, saltgrass, and iceplant.

=== Animals ===
In February, 1999, steelhead (Oncorhyncus mykiss irideus) were discovered in the creek by Toby Shackelford, making San Mateo Creek the only watercourse south of Malibu Creek in Los Angeles County with steelhead in the endangered Southern California Steelhead DPS. Steelhead have historically spawned in the creek, whose upper reaches also support a population of coastal rainbow trout, the stream resident form of O. m. irideus. There are about 11 miles (18 km) of streams in the watershed that provide suitable habitat for steelhead. Significantly, DNA analysis has shown that San Mateo Creek steelhead are genetically native southern steelhead, and not hatchery stocked fish. Steelhead in San Mateo Creek spawn primarily in the winter, when heavy storm runoff from the Santa Ana and Santa Margarita Mountains raises the creek's flow enough to breach the sandbar at San Onofre State Park. In the few weeks or months following when there is still a substantial flow in the creek, the steelhead spawn and then the adults return to sea. In the dry months following the streams in the lowlands shrink to small pools that still support amphibians and small fish including steelhead fry which need to spend about one year in freshwater. Recently, steelhead have been sighted in the creek in greater numbers, bringing attention to coastal San Diego and Orange County streams.

Other fish and amphibian species in the watershed include the endangered tidewater goby and arroyo toad. Tidewater goby reside in small to medium-sized, brackish sloughs and marshes near the mouth of the creek. The watershed also has a number of birds; endangered species include the least Bell's vireo (Vireo bellii pusillus), California gnatcatcher (Polioptila californica) and willow flycatcher (Empidonax traillii).

In early February, 2010 a golden beaver (Castor canadensis subauratus) was captured in a live trap by San Onofre State Beach officers who discovered the beaver at the river mouth of San Mateo Creek. According to State Parks officials, the species was once native to the San Mateo Creek watershed, but were thought to be extinct. Beaver were also found in an ecological survey of the lagoon near the creek mouth in 1987. A report on the fauna of the county by Dr. David Hoffman in 1866 stated "Of the animal kingdom we have a fair variety: the grizzly bear, the antelope, the deer, the polecat, the beaver, the wildcat, the otter, the fox, the badger, the hare, the squirrel, and coyotes innumerable." The beaver may have accessed San Mateo Creek from the Santa Margarita River watershed where golden beaver were re-introduced around 1940. Indirect evidence of beaver in San Diego County includes a creek named Beaver Hollow which runs 3.25 miles into the Sweetwater River about 6.5 miles southwest of Alpine. Beaver Hollow is named on the USGS Topo Map for Cuyamaca in 1903, which is twenty years before California Department of Fish and Game began beaver re-introductions in California.

== History ==
Evidence suggests that Native Americans have inhabited the lower reaches of San Mateo Creek watershed for at least 8,000 years. One of the largest villages was Panhe, an Acjachemen Indian village located at the confluence of San Mateo Creek and Cristianitos Canyon, approximately 3.7 miles (6.0 km) upstream from the Pacific Ocean. The Native Americans fished in San Mateo Creek's extensive freshwater marshes, and practiced a hunter-gatherer lifestyle. The village of Panhe is estimated to have had a population of 300 or so before the first Spanish explorers came to the area, and is still a sacred site for the Native Americans. Another Native American group, the Luiseño lived in the upper tributaries.

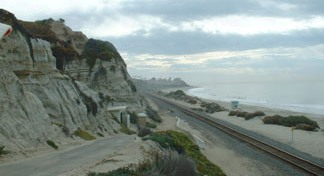
San Mateo Creek mouth at San Onofre State Beach

The first non-native people to see the creek were the Spanish explorers of the Gaspar de Portolá expedition of 1769 to Monterey Bay, who camped near the creek on July 22. Padre Juan Crespi related in his diary that, in a native village nearby, it was found that two young girls were dying. The Franciscan missionaries were given permission to baptize the two girls, and so Crespi called the place "Los Christianos". The name was later changed to the diminutive "Christianitos" (little Christians) and given to the creek. Spanish names were later given to many other creeks and canyons in the area, including San Juan Creek, Santiago Creek, and Arroyo San Onofre, many of which names remain.

After the construction of Mission San Juan Capistrano near the present-day city of the same name, the San Mateo Creek Valley was settled by the Spanish and extensively farmed and irrigated. These practices hurt the groundwater and hydrology of the area, which is slowly recovering.

Mexico became independent of Spain in 1822 and secularized the missions in 1833, which brought an end to the mission period. Thousands of acres of land formerly owned by the missions, often containing working ranches, was split into large land grants called ranchos. The 133,441-acre (540.02 km^{2}) Rancho Santa Margarita y Las Flores was granted to Pio and Andres Pico in 1841. They planted non-native crops, pumped water from the aquifer, and grazed cattle, severely damaging the grasslands and riparian habitat. By 1860, a discovery of gold, zinc, lead and silver in the upper San Mateo Creek watershed led American miners to the area. The rancho went through many hands and there were many conflicts with Native Americans before the U.S. Navy, in 1941, purchased most of the land for Camp Pendleton for around $6.5 million.

Recently a controversy has erupted over whether to extend California State Route 241 south through the lower San Mateo Creek valley to join Interstate 5 near the creek's mouth. The project was proposed to improve traffic flow on the Orange-San Diego County border. While proponents of the project claim that it will relieve congestion on the interstate and not affect the native habitat, opponents argue that the routing would increase sediment loads in the creek, damage the surf break at San Onofre State Beach, create water pollution and hurt several endangered animal species. The project prompted American Rivers to list San Mateo Creek as second on its list of America's Ten Most Endangered Rivers of 2007. No decision has been made on the project to date.
