= Rancho Capistrano =

Unincorporated community in California, United States

- Unincorporated community
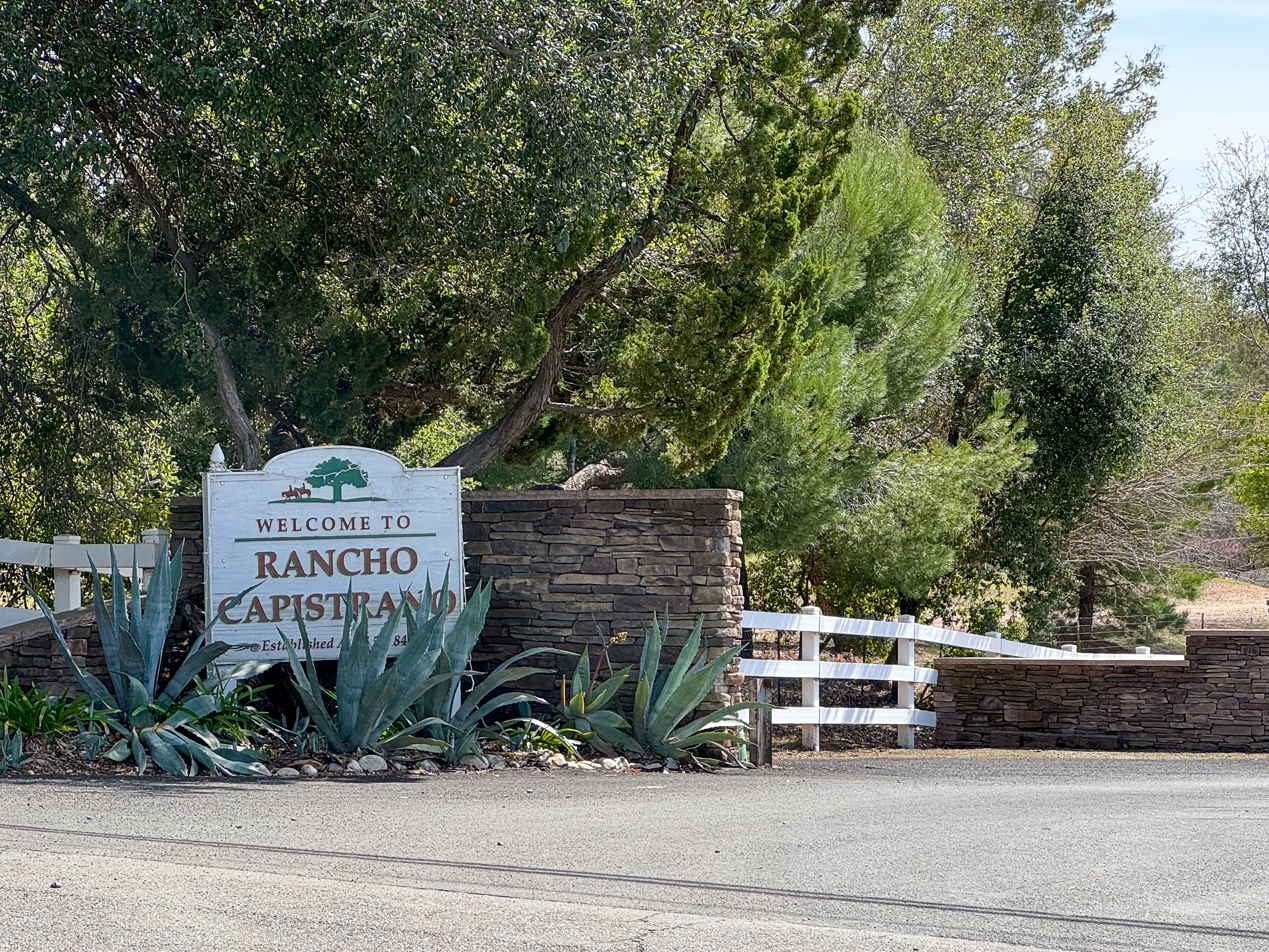
- Rancho Capistrano, Riverside County, California

- Location in California
- Coordinates: 33°36′54″N 117°21′27″W
- Country: United States
- State: California
- County: Riverside County
- Established: 1969
- Elevation: 3,041 ft (927 m)

Rancho Capistrano, is a private, gated community surrounded by the Cleveland National Forest, in Riverside County, California.

It is located within the Morrell Potrero, in the Elsinore Mountains, northwest of Elsinore Peak. The potrero, drained by Morrell Canyon Creek, a tributary of San Juan Creek, was originally the site of the Morrell Ranch. It was developed as a gated community in 1969.
