= Holy Fire (2018) =

2018 wildfire in Southern California

- Part of the 2018 California wildfires
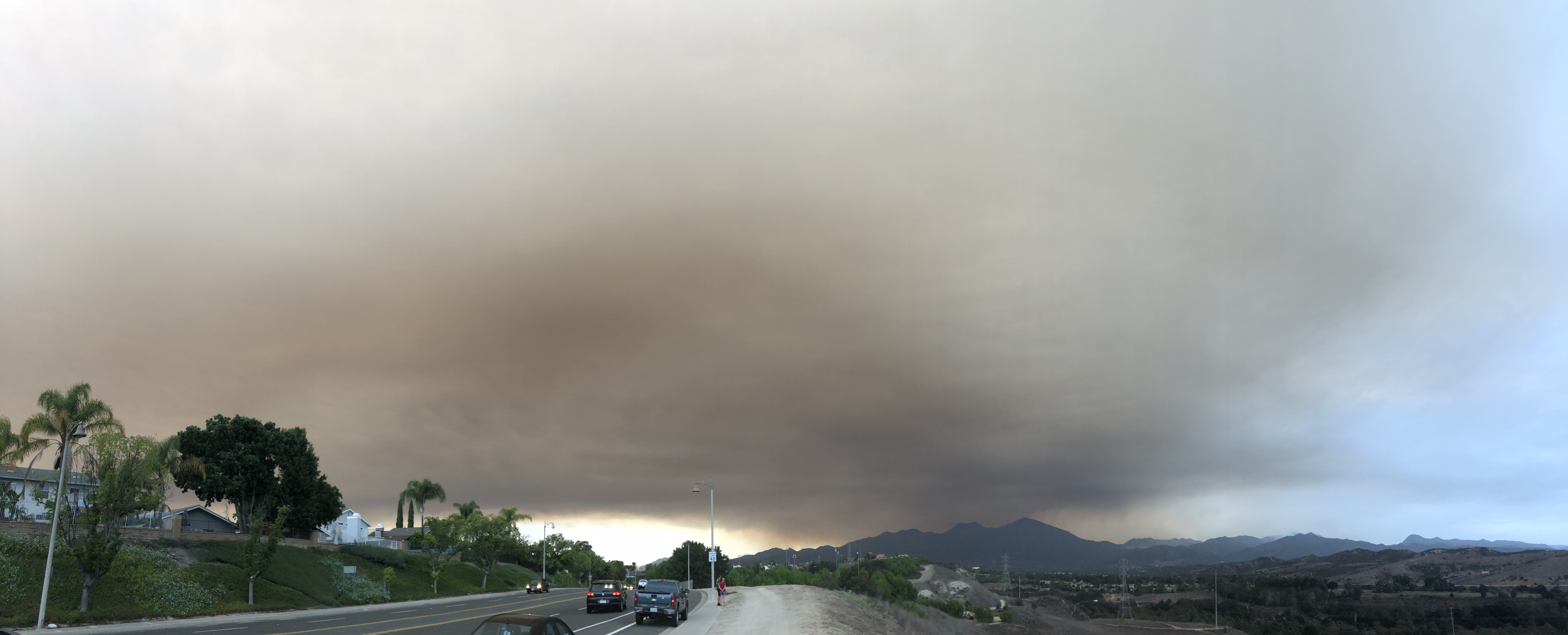
- Smoke at sunset from the Holy Fire, as seen in Mission Viejo, on August 9, 2018
- Date: August 6, 2018 –; September 13, 2018
- Location: Cleveland National Forest, Orange and Riverside Counties, California
- Coordinates: 33°40′44″N 117°31′00″W

Statistics
- Burned area: 23,136 acres (9,363 ha)

Impacts
- Deaths: None reported
- Injuries: 3 firefighters
- Structures destroyed: 18
- Cost: >$25.7 million (2018 USD)

Ignition
- Cause: Arson
- Perpetrator: Unknown (1 suspect acquitted by jury)
- Motive: Unknown

Map
- Location within California

The Holy Fire was a wildfire that burned in the Cleveland National Forest in Orange and Riverside Counties, California. The wildfire started on August 6, 2018, at around 1:15 PM PDT, in the vicinity of Trabuco Canyon. A suspected arsonist was booked into the Orange County jail in Santa Ana, California but found not guilty in 2023. The blaze burned 23,136 acres (94 km^{2}) and destroyed 18 buildings, before it was fully contained on September 13, 2018. While the fire was actively spreading in early and mid-August, residents of the nearby cities of Corona, Temescal Valley, and Lake Elsinore were placed under evacuation orders.

== Progression ==
The Holy Fire was first reported at 1:15 PM PST on Monday, August 6, 2018, in Holy Jim Canyon (from which the fire derives its name), a community of about 40 homes and cabins in the Trabuco Canyon area of the Santa Ana Mountains. Evacuation orders were issued for parts of Trabuco Canyon, including the entire community of Holy Jim. Trabuco Creek Road was subsequently closed at Trabuco Canyon Road indefinitely as the Orange County Sheriff Department continues their investigation. It quickly moved uphill in a northeast direction, jumping the crest of the Santa Ana Mountains into neighboring Riverside County, threatening the areas of Corona, El Cerrito, and Glen Ivy Hot Springs. At the time, the cause of the fire was under investigation.

== Effects ==
By August 8, thirteen cabins had been destroyed in Holy Jim (sic - impacted cabins are in Trabuco). No major injuries were reported. By August 10, one home along Ortega Highway had also been destroyed, the only confirmed home in Riverside County at that time. By August 13, the Holy Fire had destroyed a total of 18 structures in both Orange and Riverside Counties.

=== Evacuation areas ===
On August 13, the neighborhoods under mandatory evacuation included:

- Blue Jay
- El Cariso
- Glen Eden (Corona)
- Holy Jim Canyon
- Indian Canyon (Corona)
- Sycamore Creek (Corona)
- Horsethief Canyon (Corona)
- Mayhew Canyon (Corona)
- Rancho Capistrano
- Trabuco Canyon

As of August 13, neighborhoods under voluntary evacuation included:

- Trilogy (Temescal Valley)

== Criminal investigation ==
A 51-year old man was suspected by of starting the fire; he stated he was asleep at the time the fire started and his bail was set for $1 million. He pleaded not guilty in December 2018 and, in June 2023, was found not guilty of all arson charges.

== Growth and containment ==
=== Growth and Containment ===
Fire containment status Gray: contained; Red: active; %: percent contained;
Date	Acres burned (ha)	Containment	Growth (%)
Aug 7	4,000 (1,600)		N/A
Aug 8	6,200 (2,500)		+55%
Aug 9	10,236 (4,142)		+65.1%
Aug 10	19,107 (7,732)		+86.6%
Aug 11	21,473 (8,690)		+12.4%
Aug 13	22,714 (9,192)		+5.7%
Aug 14	22,986 (9,302)		+1.2%
Aug 15	22,986 (9,302)		+0%
Aug 16	22,986 (9,302)		+0%
Aug 18	22,986 (9,302)		+0%
Aug 24	22,986 (9,302)		+0%
Aug 26	22,986 (9,363)		+0%
Aug 27	23,136 (9,363)		+0.6%
Sep 13	23,136 (9,363)		+0%

== See also ==
- 2018 California wildfires
- Santiago Fire – burned in a similar location in 2007; also caused by arson
- Silverado Fire – burned in a similar location in October 2020; ignited by Santa Ana Winds.
- Mendocino Complex Fire
