= Los Alamos Canyon Creek =

Los Alamos Canyon Creek Los Alamos Canyon
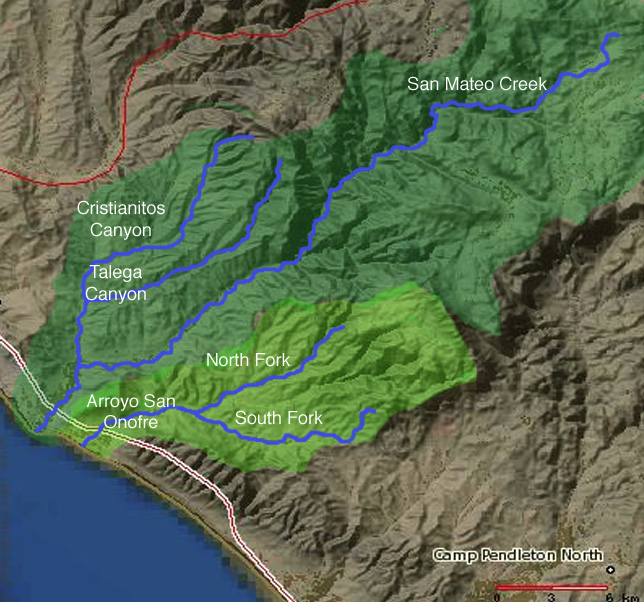
- Map of San Mateo Creek and Arroyo San Onofre drainage basins. San Mateo Creek basin is in dark green.

Location
- Country: United States
- State: California
- Region: Riverside County

Physical characteristics
- Source: southeastern slope of Elsinore Mountains
  - coordinates: 33°35′39″N 117°19′05″W
  - elevation: 2,300 ft (700 m)
- Mouth: confluence with San Mateo Creek
  - coordinates: 33°33′04″N 117°23′38″W
  - elevation: 1,312 ft (400 m)
- Length: 7 mi (11 km)
- Discharge
  - location: confluence with San Mateo Creek, Santa Ana Mountains

Basin features
- Tributaries
  - left: unnamed arroyo from Tenaja Mountain highland & Santa Rosa Plateau
  - right: unnamed arroyo from Elsinore Mountains, below Elsinore Peak., Wildhorse Canyon Creek, unnamed arroyo from San Mateo Peak

Los Alamos Canyon Creek, a stream or arroyo, tributary to San Mateo Creek, in the Cleveland National Forest in Riverside County, California. Its source is at an altitude of 2300 feet, in a canyon on the south face of the ridge of Elsinore Mountains that descends to the southeast from Elsinore Peak. The creek descends southward for a short distance then turns southwest for 4 miles where it turns west for 3 miles down Los Alamos Canyon to its confluence with San Mateo Creek at an elevation of 1312 feet.

Los Alamos Canyon Creek has one named tributary Wildhorse Canyon Creek but has two unnamed arroyos descending from the Elsinore Mountains. and one that drains the western Santa Rosa Plateau and the east slope of the Tenaja Mountain highland and descends to the north to join the creek where it turns to the west.
