= San Mateo Peak =

Mountain in California, United States

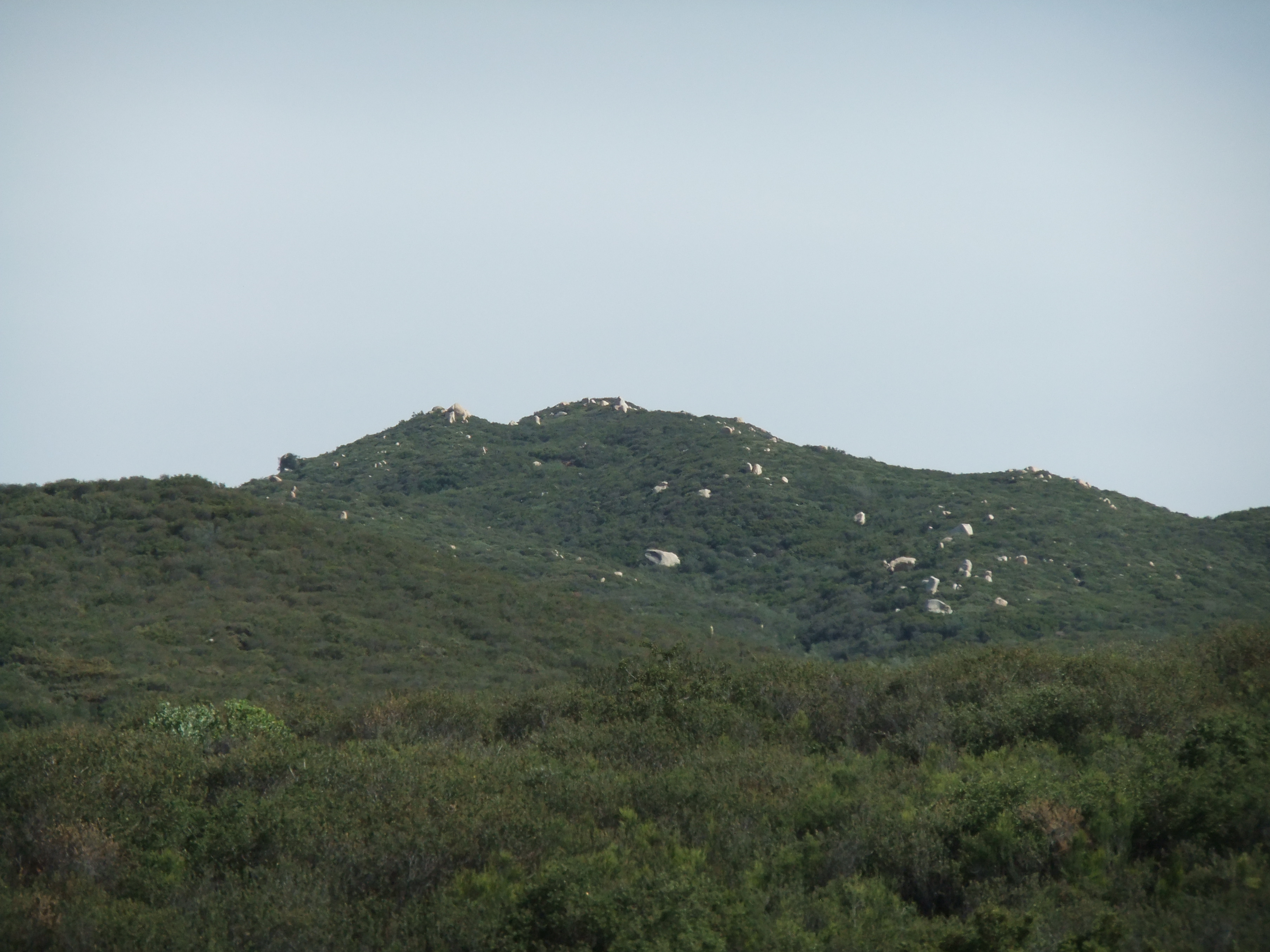
- San Mateo Peak seen from the northeast at Morgan Trail-head.

Highest point
- Elevation: 3,591 ft (1,095 m)
- Listing: Sierra Club, Lower Peaks Committee
- Coordinates: 33°36′47″N 117°22′44″W

Geography
- Location within California
- Location: Riverside County, California, U.S.
- Parent range: Elsinore Mountains, Santa Ana Mountain Range
- Topo map(s): USGS Sitton Peak, CA

Geology
- Mountain type: Granitic

Climbing
- Easiest route: Hike class 1

San Mateo Peak is an unofficially named 3,591-foot (1,095-meter) peak at the western end of the ridge running west then northwest from Elsinore Peak to Morrell Canyon, south and west of the Morrell Potrero in the Elsinore Mountains of the Santa Ana Mountain Range in southern California. The peak name was given by the Sierra Club Lower Peaks Committee Guide, originally named by Ken Croker who for 20 years maintained trails in the Santa Ana Mountains with volunteers from the Sierra Club. It remains officially nameless despite being the highest summit in the Elsinore Mountains, higher than the 3,536-foot (1,078-meter) Elsinore Peak, the highest named peak in those mountains.

San Mateo Creek has its source at an elevation of 2,800 feet (850 m) in the canyon on the western face of this peak. A fork of Morrell Canyon Creek, a tributary of San Juan Creek, has its source on the northeast face of this peak as do several arroyos descending to the west from the peak into that same creek. An unnamed arroyo, also tributary to San Mateo Creek, has its source on the southwest face of ridge descending to the south from this peak.
