= Tenaja Canyon Creek =

Tenaja Canyon Creek Tenaja Canyon
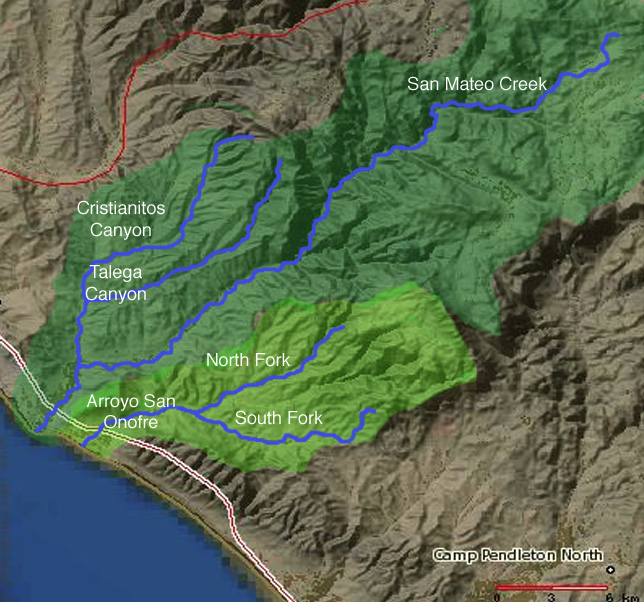
- Map of San Mateo Creek and Arroyo San Onofre drainage basins. San Mateo Creek basin is in dark green.

Location
- Country: United States
- State: California
- Region: Riverside County

Physical characteristics
- Source: at the head of Tenaja Canyon, at the confluence of arroyos from El Potrero del Tenaja, Redonda Mesa and Tenaja Mountain highlands.
  - coordinates: 33°30′23″N 117°21′51″W
  - elevation: 1,875 ft (572 m)
- Mouth: confluence with San Mateo Creek near Fishermans Camp
  - coordinates: 33°31′46″N 117°24′32″W
  - elevation: 1,112 ft (339 m)
- Length: 3.5 mi (5.6 km)
- Discharge
  - location: Pacific Ocean

Basin features
- Tributaries
  - right: unnamed arroyo from Tenaja Mountain highlands, unnamed arroyo from Tenaja Mountain highlands

Tenaja Canyon Creek, a stream or arroyo, tributary to San Mateo Creek, in the Cleveland National Forest in Riverside County, California. Its source is at an altitude of 1875 feet. The creek has its source at the confluence of arroyos from El Potrero del Tenaja, Redonda Mesa and Tenaja Mountain highlands. and it flows northwestward 3 1/2 miles down Tenaja Canyon to its mouth and its confluence near Fishermans Camp, at an elevation of 1112 feet with San Mateo Creek. The word may refer to the arroyo El Portero del Tenaja or to the topographic structure.
