= Rancho Potreros de San Juan Capistrano =

Mexican land grant in California

Coordinates: 33.640°N 117.460°W

Rancho Potreros de San Juan Capistrano was a 1,168-acre (4.73 km^{2}) Mexican land grant in present-day Orange County and Riverside County, California given in 1845 by Governor Pío Pico to John Forster. The grant was composed of three detached tracts, called (from north to south), Rancho Potrero los Pinos (523 acres (2.1 km^{2})), Rancho Potrero el Cariso (168 acres (0.7 km^{2})), and Rancho Potrero de la Cienega (477 acres (1.9 km^{2})). The grants were located in the Santa Ana Mountains in the present-day Cleveland National Forest in the southeast corner of the Orange County and western Riverside County.

== History ==
John Forster received three small mountain potreros (pasture areas) of the former Mission San Juan Capistrano in 1845. These were the Potrero Los Pinos, Potrero El Cariso in the upper San Juan Creek watershed and Potrero de Los Cienega in the upper reach of San Mateo Creek.

With the cession of California to the United States following the Mexican-American War, the 1848 Treaty of Guadalupe Hidalgo provided that the land grants would be honored. As required by the Land Act of 1851, a claim for Rancho Potreros de San Juan Capistrano was filed with the Public Land Commission in 1852, and the grant was patented to John Forster in 1866.

== See also ==
- Ranchos of California
- List of Ranchos of California
