= Trestles Bridge =

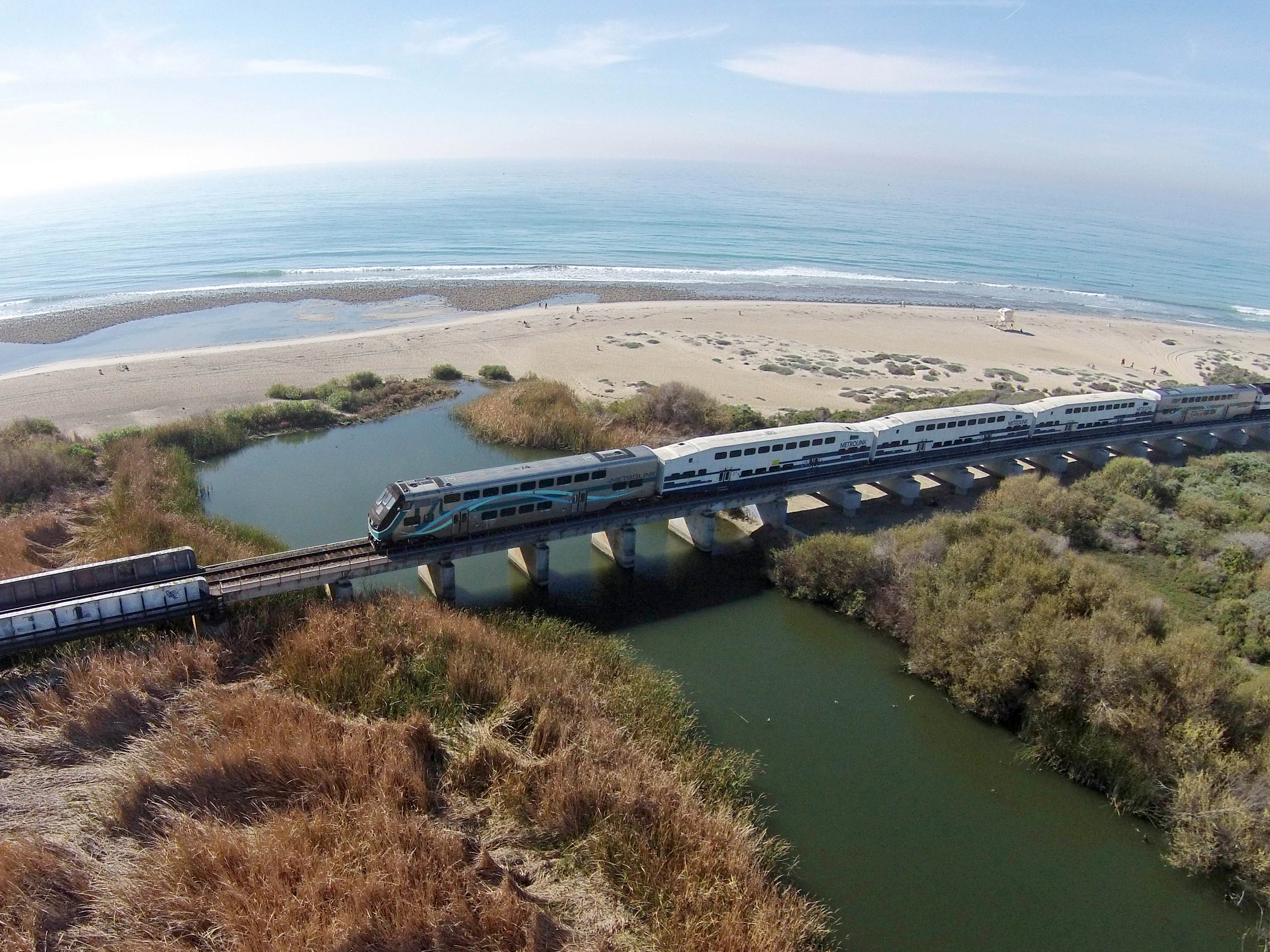
- A Metrolink train crosses Trestles Bridge in February 2015
- Coordinates: 33°23′12″N 117°35′38″W
- Carries: Surf Line: Amtrak Pacific Surfliner, Metrolink Orange County Line, BNSF Railway freight trains
- Crosses: San Mateo Creek
- Locale: northern San Diego County, California
- Official name: Railroad Bridge 207.6
- Other name: San Mateo Creek Bridge
- Owner: North County Transit District

Rail characteristics
- No. of tracks: single
- Track gauge: 4 ft 8 1/2 in (1,435 mm) standard gauge

History
- Opened: 1941
- Rebuilt: 1992 and 2010–2012

Statistics
- Daily traffic: ~45 trains per day

Location
- Interactive map of Trestles Bridge

Trestles Bridge, more formally known as Railroad Bridge 207.6 or the San Mateo Creek Bridge, is a low railroad viaduct which carries the Surf Line on the coast of Southern California, in northern San Diego County near its border with Orange County. The bridge lies within San Onofre State Beach and gave its nickname to the famed Trestles surfing site at that beach.

The single-track bridge spans San Mateo Creek between the San Clemente Pier station to the north and the Oceanside Transit Center to the south. Part of the LOSSAN Rail Corridor—the only rail connection between San Diego and Greater Los Angeles, and the second busiest rail line in the United States—it is used by approximately 45 trains per day and 2.7 million people per year, including Amtrak Pacific Surfliner trains, Metrolink Orange County Line commuter trains, and BNSF freight trains.

== History ==
A railroad first bridged the creek in this location in 1891. In 1941, a wooden trestle bridge 858 feet (262 m) long was built in this location. The nearby waves had already been surfed as early as 1937, and by 1951, local surfers had named the beach and its surf break "Trestles", after the bridge there.

In 1992, the railway line containing the bridge was purchased by the North County Transportation District from the Atchison, Topeka and Santa Fe Railway. Storms caused by the El Niño of 1998 damaged the bridge, leading a center section of the bridge 200 feet (61 m) long to be replaced by concrete and leaving separated wooden sections 100 feet (30 m) long in the south and 558 feet (170 m) long in the north.

By 2007, inspectors determined that the northern segment of the bridge needed replacement. Salt from the beach environment had rotted the wooden support beams, they had been damaged by fires set by beachgoers, the creosote protecting the beams had been worn away, and the bridge did not meet seismic standards. Trains could not travel on the bridge at full speeds, and frequent bridge maintenance was costing US$250,000 per year. Construction began in 2010, and a new concrete replacement for this bridge segment opened in 2012 at a cost of eight million dollars, paid by federal funds from the American Recovery and Reinvestment Act of 2009.

== Design ==
In order to protect the 2012 bridge segment against corrosion, its rebar was protected by an epoxy coating and calcium nitrite was added as a corrosion inhibitor to its reinforced concrete. The new concrete supports for the bridge structure are etched with letters spelling "Trestles", the nickname of the bridge.
