= Tinaja =

Depression landform in bedrock

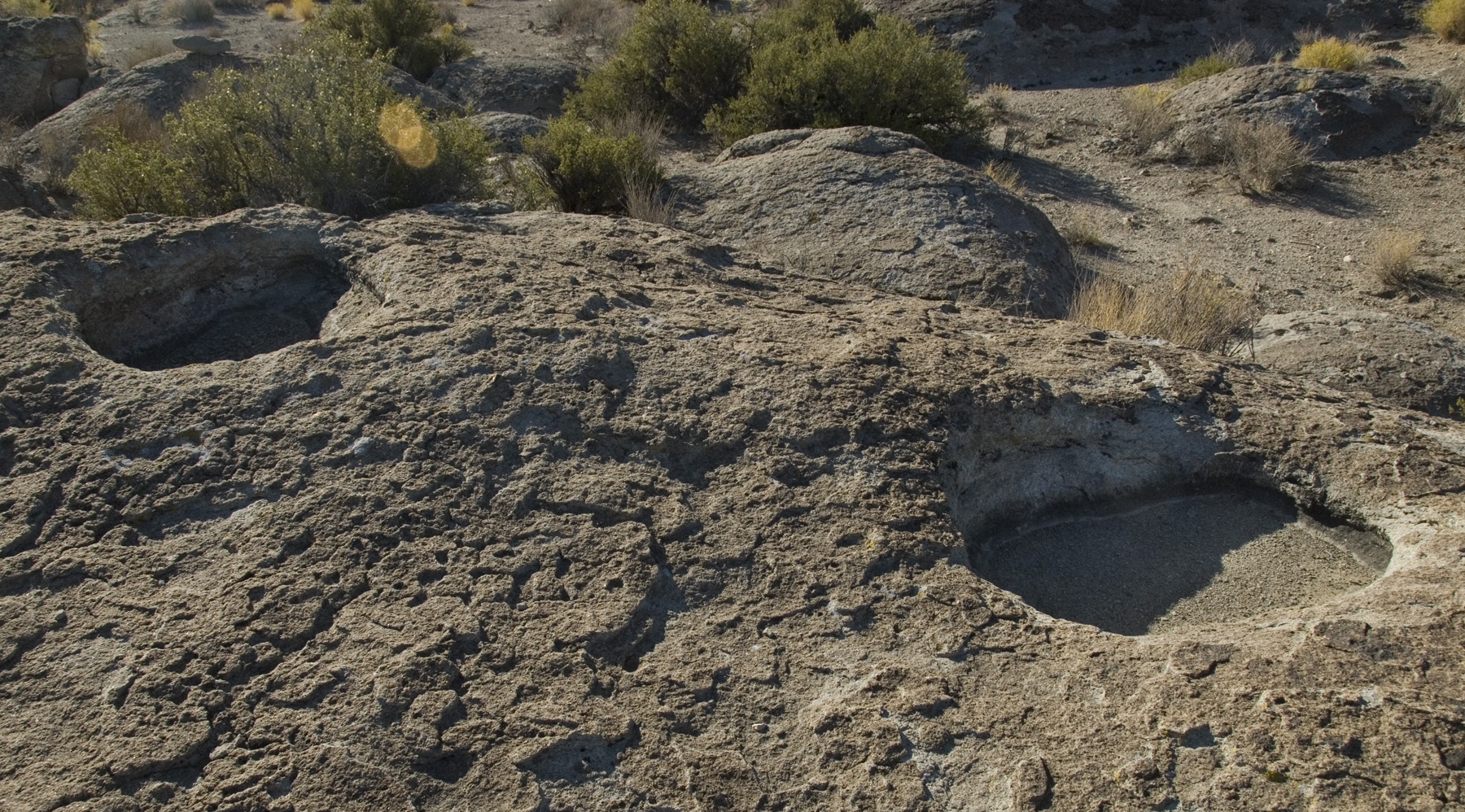
Tinajas in Lincoln County, Nevada

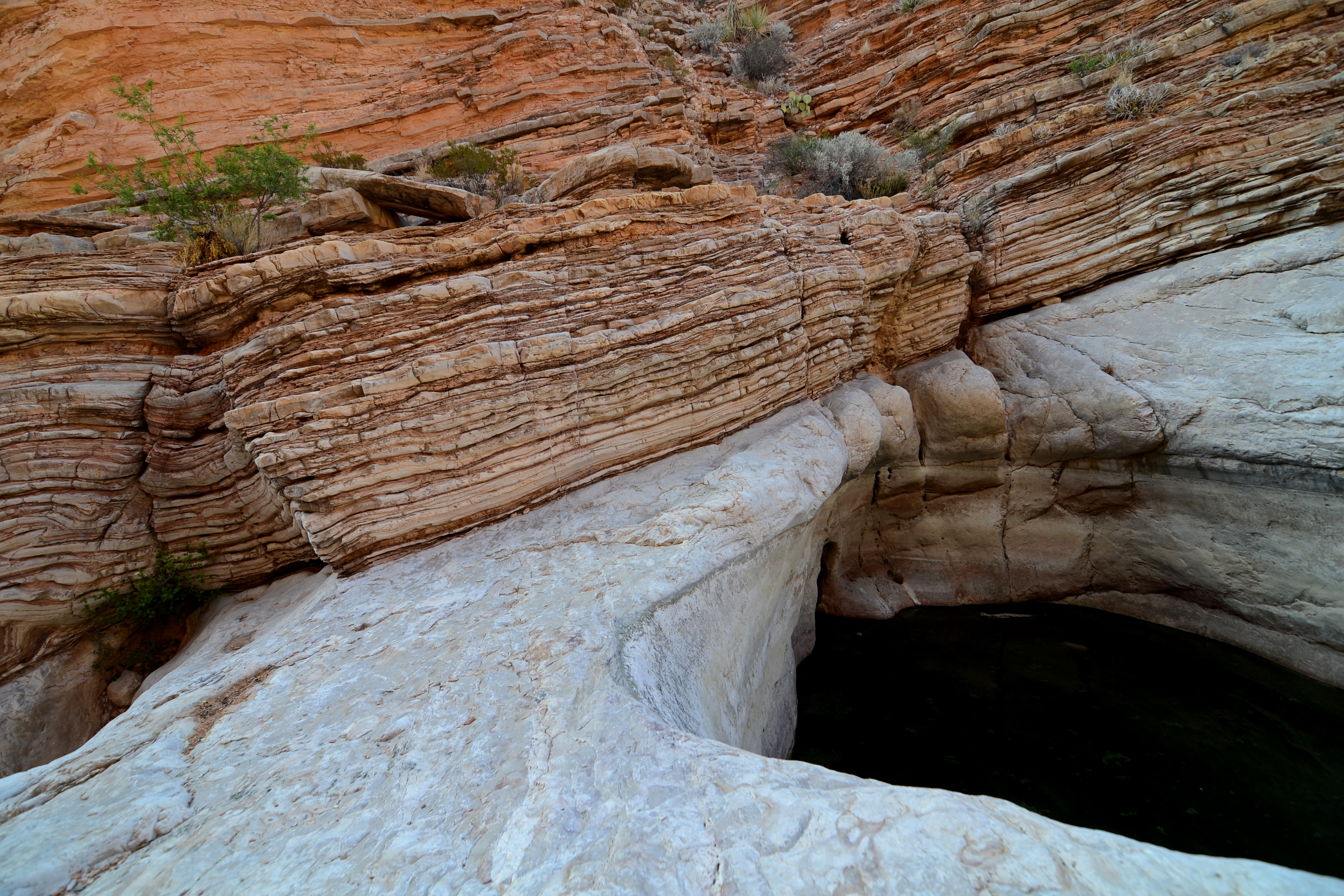
Ernst tinaja, Big Bend National Park, Texas

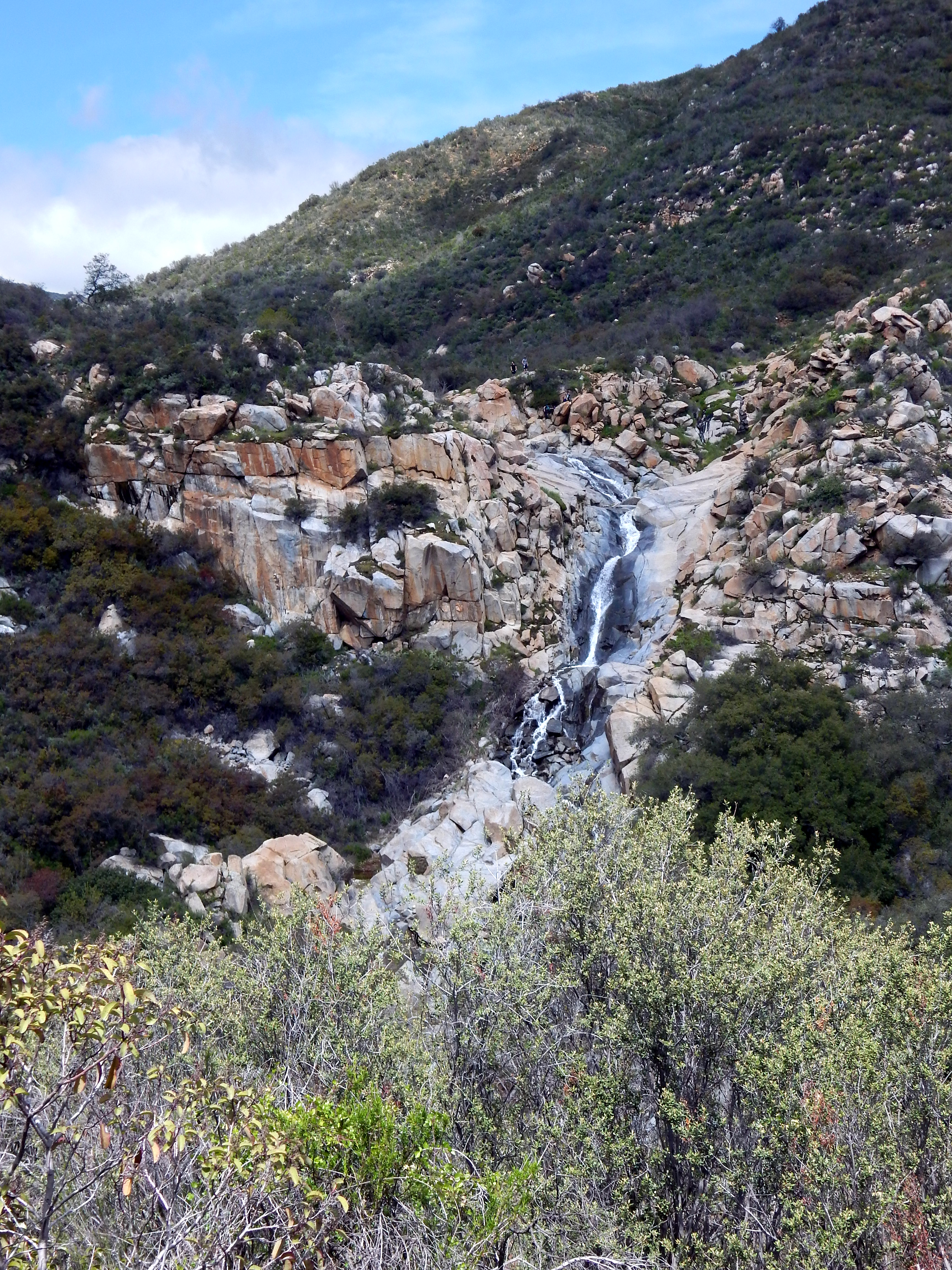
Tenaja Falls part of Tenaja Canyon Creek, Cleveland National Forest, California, USA - seen from Tenaja Truck Trail

A tinaja [tiˈnaxa], sometimes tenaja, is a surface pocket (depression) formed in bedrock that occurs below waterfalls, that is carved out by spring flow or seepage, or that is caused by sand and gravel scouring in intermittent streams (arroyos). The term usually implies a natural or geologic cistern in rock which retains water. They are often created by erosional processes within intermittent streams.

Tinajas are an important source of surface water storage in arid environments.

These relatively rare landforms are important ecologically, because they support unique plant communities and provide important services to terrestrial wildlife.

== Etymology ==
From the Spanish tinaja: a clay pot or earthenware jar, and is used in the American Southwest.

== United States ==
Before European settlers came to America, tenajas were a valuable source of water for early Native Americans traveling in the desert areas of the Southwest. Today, tenajas are an integral part of sustaining life in the arid Southwest. For example, tenajas at the Santa Rosa Plateau in southern California allow western pond turtles, California newts and red-legged frogs to survive through dry summer months.

During prolonged dry spells, deep tinajas may trap desert animals who cannot climb out due to the smooth walls.

== Examples ==
- The Tinajas Altas ("high tinajas") in southern Arizona.
- Several in El Pinacate y Gran Desierto de Altar Biosphere Reserve, Sonora, Mexico.
- Las Tinajas de Los Indios, California
- Las Tinajas, Zinapécuaro, Mexico
- San Estaban Dam on Alamito Creek at the tinaja in Presidio County, Texas
- Seven Sacred Pools, Sedona, Arizona
- Tenaja Canyon Creek, Cleveland National Forest, California, USA
- Ernst Tinaja, Big Bend National Park, Texas, USA
- Santa Rosa Plateau Wildlife Area, Riverside County, California, USA
