= Elsinore Mountains =

Mountain ridge in Riverside County, California

Coordinates: 33°37′N 117°21′W

The Elsinore Mountains are a ridge of mountains within the larger range of the Santa Ana Mountains, in the Cleveland National Forest, Riverside County, California, United States. The tallest peak within the range is the unofficially named San Mateo Peak at 3,591 ft (1,095 m). The second tallest is officially named Elsinore Peak at 3,536 ft (1,078 m). The Elsinore Mountanins run in a ridge from just east of El Cariso, southeast to Elsinore Peak. Beyond that peak the ridge begins to descend and curves to the east. From Elsinore Peak, a ridge runs to the west and then northwest to San Mateo Peak, enclosing the Morrell Potrero on the south and west.

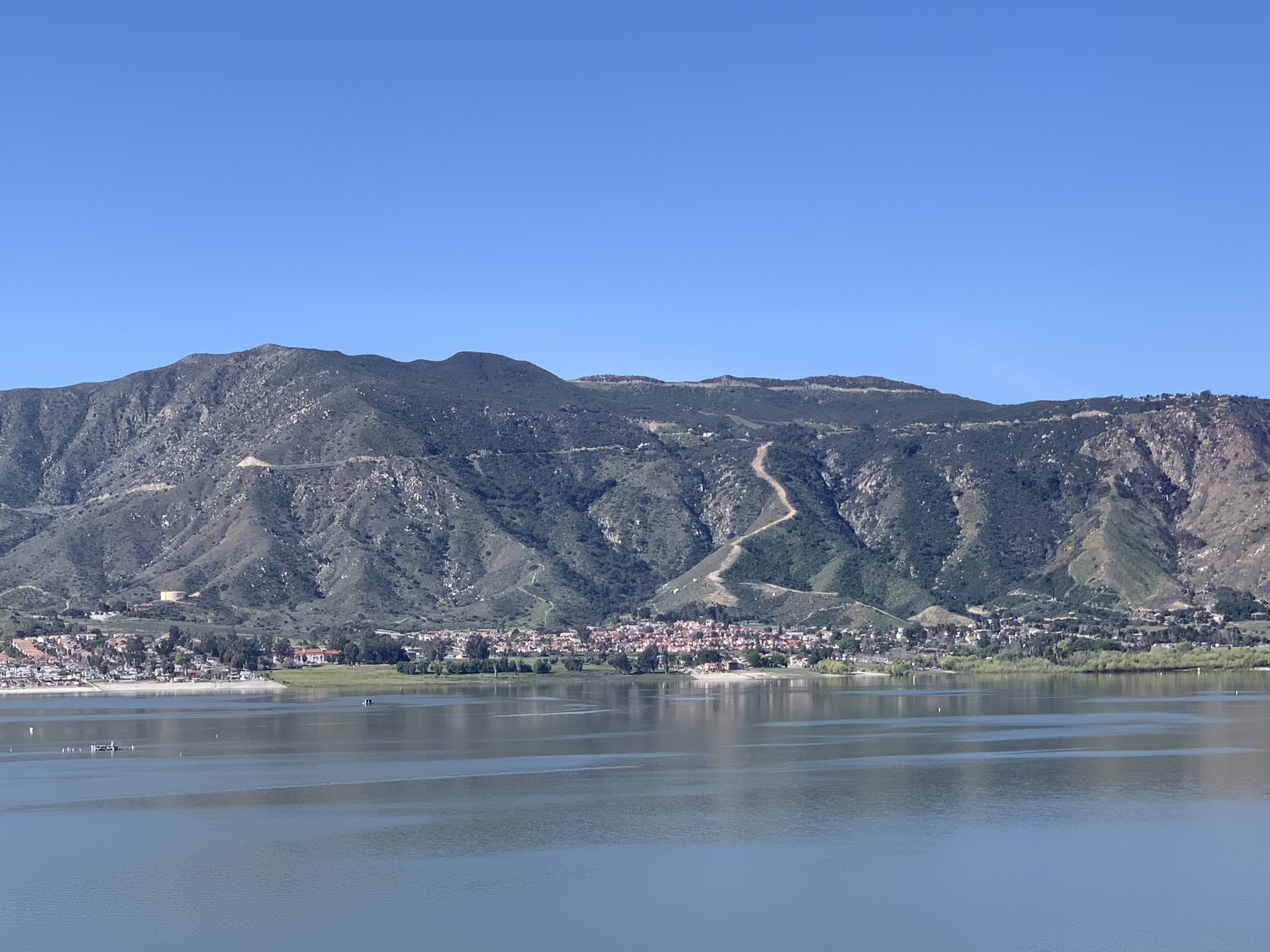
Elsinore Mountains viewed from across Lake Elsinore

Decker Canyon Creek and Morrell Canyon Creek, tributaries of San Juan Creek, and San Mateo Creek have their sources on the western face of the Elsinore Mountains. Los Alamos Canyon Creek, and its tributary Wildhorse Canyon Creek, tributaries of San Mateo Creek, drain its south facing slopes. The ephemeral streams on the eastern slopes drain into Lake Elsinore (tributary to the Santa Ana River), except on the far southeastern ridge, where they are tributary to Murrieta Creek, a tributary of the Santa Margarita River.
