= Devil Canyon Creek =

Devil Canyon Creek Devil Canyon
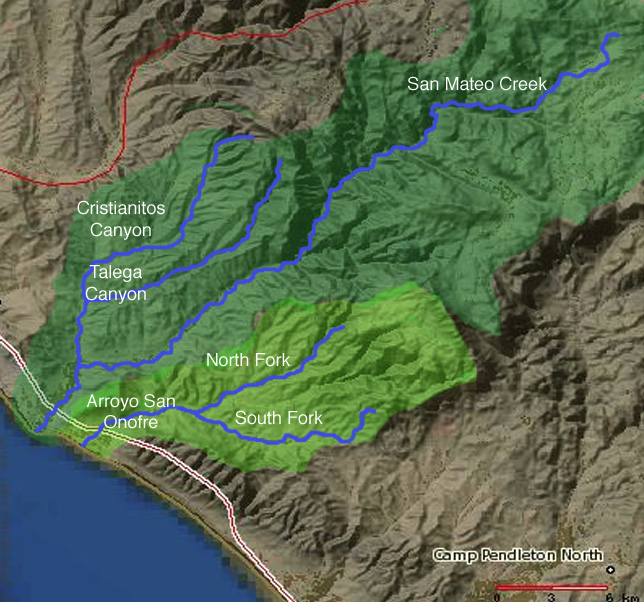
- Map of San Mateo Creek and Arroyo San Onofre drainage basins. San Mateo Creek basin is in dark green.

Location
- Country: United States
- State: California
- Region: San Diego County

Physical characteristics
- Source: a flat in the Santa Margarita Mountains
  - coordinates: 33°27′38″N 117°22′28″W
  - elevation: 2,440 ft (740 m)
- Mouth: confluence with San Mateo Creek
  - coordinates: 33°28′24″N 117°27′57″W
  - elevation: 453 ft (138 m)
- Length: 8 mi (13 km)
- Discharge
  - location: Pacific Ocean

Basin features
- Tributaries
  - right: Cold Spring Canyon Creek

Devil Canyon Creek is a stream or arroyo, tributary to San Mateo Creek, in the Santa Margarita Mountains; all but its first and last part are within the Cleveland National Forest in San Diego County, California. Its source is at an altitude of 2440 feet on a flat private land in the Santa Margarita Mountains. It flows southwestward before turning down into the canyon and the San Mateo Wilderness, then northward 2 miles before turning westward toward its confluence in San Mateo Canyon with San Mateo Creek at an elevation of 453 feet. The last half mile of the creek before this confluence is outside the National Forest boundary, and within the Camp Pendleton Marine Corps Base. Devil Canyon has one named tributary, Cold Spring Canyon Creek, draining the Santa Margarita Mountains north of the Devil Canyon watershed; Cold Spring Canyon Creek enters it from the right about a mile and half above the confluence of Devil Canyon Creek with San Mateo Creek.
