= Cristianitos Creek =

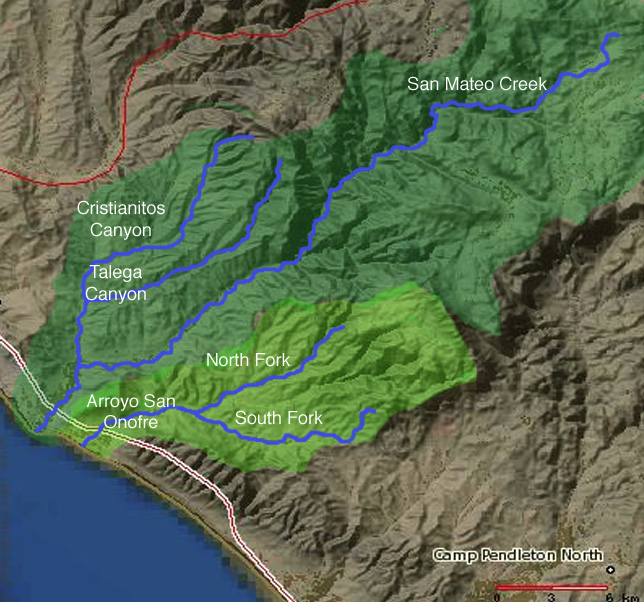
- Map of San Mateo Creek and Arroyo San Onofre drainage basins. San Mateo Creek basin is in dark green.

Location
- Country: United States
- State: California
- Region: Orange County, San Diego County

Physical characteristics
- Source: at the head of Cristianitos Canyon, Santa Ana Mountains, in Orange County County
  - coordinates: 33°30′36″N 117°33′3″W
  - elevation: 800 ft (240 m)
- Mouth: confluence with San Mateo Creek, in San Diego County
  - coordinates: 33°25′11″N 117°34′13″W
  - elevation: 75 ft (23 m)
- Length: 7 mi (11 km)
- Discharge
  - location: Pacific Ocean

Basin features
- Tributaries
  - left: Gabino Canyon Creek, Talega Canyon Creek

Cristianitos Canyon Creek is a triburary stream or arroyo to the San Mateo Creek located in the Santa Ana Mountains of California. It has an length of around 11 kilometers (7 mi) and discharges into the Pacific Ocean.

== Flow ==
It is source at an altitude of around 243 meters (800 ft) at the head of Cristianitos Canyon in the foothills of the Santa Ana Mountains within Orange County, California. The creek then flows southwestward down Cristianitos Canyon then turning south towards its confluence with San Mateo Creek, at an elevation of 23 meters (75 ft) in San Diego County. Along its course it has two major tributaries that come in from the left bank from the Santa Ana Mountains southwest and south of the Verdugo Potrero. The first is Gabino Canyon Creek arising at an elevation of 569 meters (1,840 ft) in the extreme southwestern part of Riverside County around a mile north of the San Diego County line and flows southwest, adding the waters of La Paz Canyon Creek on its way to its confluence with Cristianitos Creek, at the mouth of Cristianitos Canyon, at an elevation of 92 meters (301 ft) in Orange County. The second is Talega Canyon Creek which also arises in the Santa Anna Mountains, in southwestern part of Riverside County at altitude of over 600 meters (2000 ft) above sea level. It then flows southwestward into Orange County until it reaches its confluence with Cristianitos Creek at an elevation of 177 feet (54 m) just over the county line in San Diego County, on the Marine Corps Base Camp Pendleton.
