= Rancho Potrero de la Cienaga =

Mexican land grant in California

Coordinates: 33.593°N 117.400°W

Rancho Potrero de la Cienaga is one of the three ranchos that made up the Rancho Potreros de San Juan Capistrano. Its boundary included in the spring watered mountain valley pastures of Round Potrero and Potrero de la Cienaga, in the upper reach of San Mateo Creek in the Santa Ana Mountains in the present day Cleveland National Forest in western Riverside County, United States. It was later known as Rancho Carillo and the Wheeler Ranch. It was subdivided into the Rancho Carillo community in 1962.
