= Seven Sacred Pools =

Lakes in Arizona

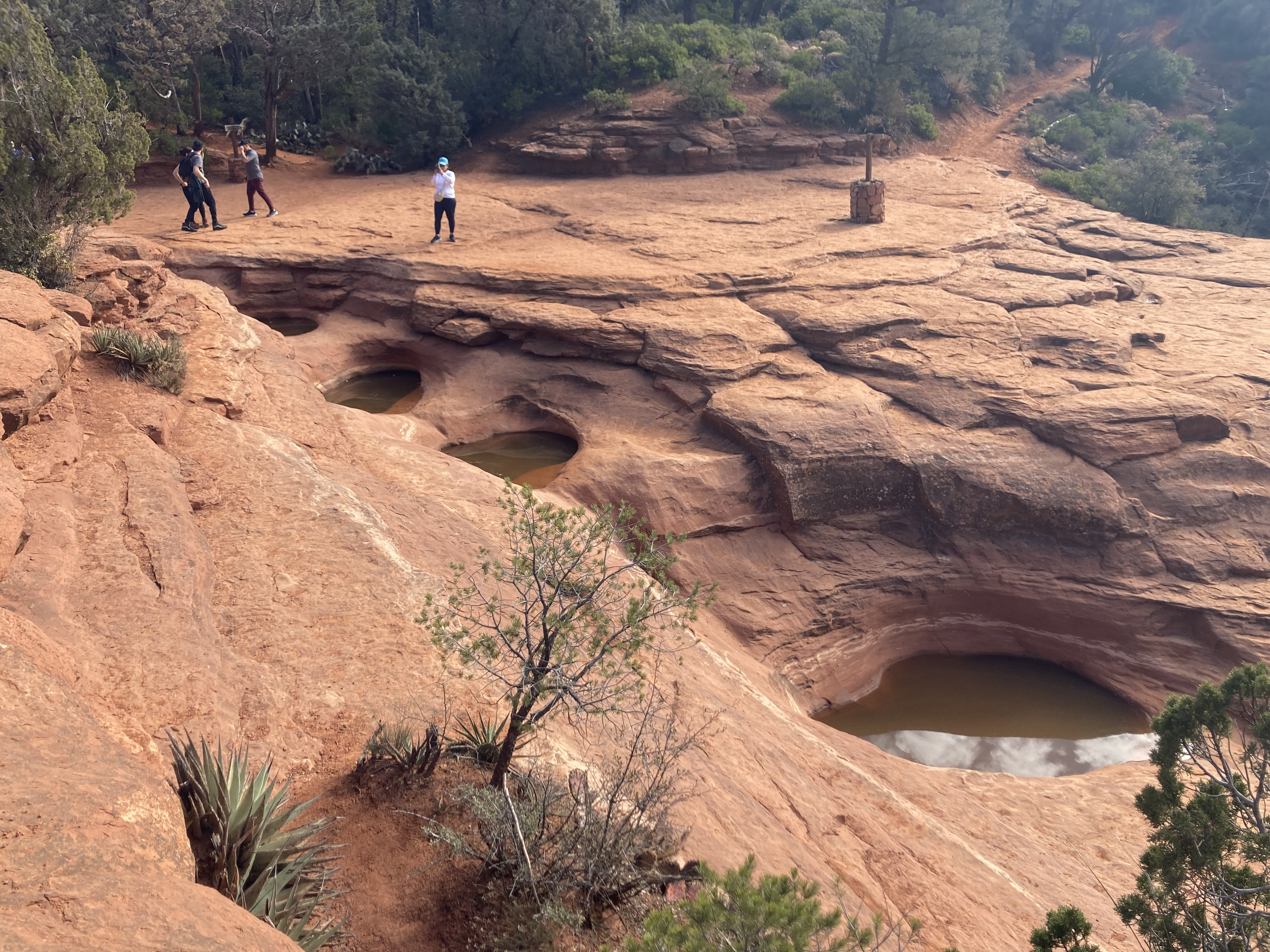
- A section of the pools in 2024

- Location within Arizona Location within the United States
- Location: Soldier Pass Trail, Coconino National Forest
- Coordinates: 34.8902°N 111.7859°W
- Surface elevation: 4,456 ft (1,358 m)

The Seven Sacred Pools are a group of small pools (tinajas) on the Coconino National Forest's Soldier Pass Trail, near Sedona, Arizona. They are easily accessible from the trail but are only available to be seen during certain times of the year, as the stream that feeds them is seasonal. The pools are carved into sandstone naturally. They are also an important water source for wildlife that inhabit the area, as it is on the border between Oak Creek Canyon and the surrounding desert. Tadpoles can be occasionally found in the pools. Its name was given to it by local tour guides who provided their services on Jeeps.
