= Southern California Steelhead DPS =

Migratory steelhead trout population segment in Southern California

Southern California Steelhead DPS Boundary Map

The Southern California Steelhead Distinct Population Segment (DPS) occurs from the Santa Maria River to the Tijuana River at the United States and Mexican Border in seasonally accessible rivers and streams. Steelhead (Oncorhynchus mykiss) in the Southern California Steelhead DPS, much like its relatives further north, requires sufficient flows in their natal streams to be able to return from oceans and lakes to spawn. Due to the extended periods of drought throughout their range, Southern California steelhead are most commonly seen during periods of increased rainfall, such as El Niño events. Declared federally endangered in 1997, the geographic range of the DPS when first listed extended from the Santa Maria River south to Malibu Creek. In 2002 steelhead were discovered in San Mateo Creek on the county line of Orange and San Diego counties. With this discovery the range of the DPS was extended to include Los Angeles, Orange, and San Diego counties.

== Threats ==
There are many threats to the survival of the Southern California Steelhead DPS. Principal threats include, but are not limited to, alteration of stream flow patterns and habitat degradation, barriers to fish passages, channel alterations, water quality problems, non-native exotic fish and plants and climate change. These threats pose a serious challenge to the persistence of Southern California Steelhead, and most threats are increasing in magnitude as human population grows in Southern California.

Adequate stream flow is important to steelhead, for both returning fish as well as young fish migrating to the sea. Lowered stream flows can impede passage for fish in both directions, as fish are unable to breach sand bars that form at the mouths of rivers and streams during the summer months. Natural flows flush fine sediment and silt and provide for better spawning surfaces for the Southern California Steelhead. Higher flows also bring water to riparian areas, which rejuvenate vegetation that provides shade and habitat for spawning fish. This riparian habitat will also better regulate water temperatures. Anthropogenic structures such as dams also impede passage upstream.

Water quality is another problem that Southern California Steelhead face. Those fish that still have natal streams to return to often face degraded water quality. Steelhead eggs require clean flowing water to hatch. Sedimentation of streams from agricultural and urban runoff has the potential to smother eggs in a stream and greatly decrease the number of Steelhead surviving to return to the ocean. Urban runoff can funnel contaminants directly into streams. Runoff containing industrial or urban contaminants can directly cause fish mortality and decreased reproduction. Point and non-point pollution sources also have similar effects. Discharges can also cause thermal stress on the fish, or can increase favorable habitat for non-native exotic species, such as Largemouth bass, carp and catfish, all of which will prey on juvenile Steelhead and eggs. O. mykiss is used as an indicator species for water quality problems; therefore can be used to indicate problems in water quality.

== Conservation ==
There are many ways to preserve important steelhead habitat. Like all steelhead, Southern California steelhead require cool, clean water and appropriate aggregate for spawning. Water management will allow for low flow streams to provide adequate water for juveniles. Water removal is creating the problem of not leaving the minimum level of flows for fish in streams. Man-made barriers such as dams remove water from lower sections of streams and rivers as well as restrict migration upstream.

Development should be regulated near streams with plans in place for recharge of groundwater to ensure enough water to enhance survival of Steelhead during dry summer months and periods of prolonged drought. Working with local agencies and organizations such as Trout Unlimited has proved beneficial to bringing awareness to Steelhead and their preservation. Removal of invasive non-native vegetation will allow for native vegetation to better compete and provide habitat and services for degraded streams. Removal non-native fish species is another step that can be taken to improve habitat and successful spawning.

Introduced species such as Largemouth bass, sunfish, carp and catfish have been introduced into streams and native trout and are unable to compete with these voracious predators. Non-native exotics such as these are better adapted to poor water quality and are successful in streams that Southern California Steelhead occupy, increasing pressure on native trout and Steelhead species. Organizations such as TU, in partnership with California Department of Fish and Wildlife, have begun removal and assessment of non-native fish in critical streams such as San Mateo Creek.

The lack of data is another potential threat. Further research is needed to fully understand this species due to small but important variations in their life histories. Southern California Steelhead depend on rain fed streams for their survival, as well as lagoon/estuary type systems that is typical for some Southern Steelhead. Spawning cycles are not fully understood, and many fish will not return to streams for over five years, while some will return after only one year in an attempt to successfully spawn. By fully understanding these fish, management plans can be more precisely developed.

Southern California Steelhead is a unique species found in places not many would expect to find. They have been able to survive in extremely harsh conditions and even change life history patterns when necessary. Anthropogenic impacts are the driving cause for this species status and their decreasing numbers, but with sound planning this species has the potential to survive. It is estimated that this species will be extinct in the next fifty years without immediate action, but what actions that must be taken is dependent on involvement of both state and local governments as well as the community.

== Conservation strategies ==
Due to human impacts throughout its range, viable populations of Southern California steelhead have been greatly reduced, and recovery will be dependent on ensuring the success of these viable populations. Recovery will take place in the physically largest watersheds in Southern California such as the Ventura River, as well those watersheds, which may not be as large, that hold breeding populations such as San Mateo Creek. These populations will be the focus of recovery efforts, and by directing resources to these Steelhead, the entire Southern California DPS will better preserved as a whole. Recovery of Southern California Steelhead will require a broad range of objectives to be met. Viable populations must be protected as well as the restoration and protection of their habitat. NOAA has established six objectives for the recovery of Southern California Steelhead:

- Prevent steelhead extinction by protecting existing populations and their habitats
- Maintain current distribution of steelhead and restore distribution to previously occupied areas
- Increase abundance of steelhead to viable population levels, including the expression of all life‐history forms and strategies
- Conserve existing genetic diversity and provide opportunities for interchange of genetic material between and within viable populations
- Maintain and restore suitable habitat conditions and characteristics to support all life history stages of viable populations
- Conduct research and monitoring necessary to refine and demonstrate attainment of recovery criteria.

Meeting these objectives will have a significant impact of the future of Southern California Steelhead, and ensure successful breeding populations throughout its range.

Approximately 23 million people occupy Southern California, and recovery of this species will require the Southern California Steelhead to re-integrate into habitats modified by humans. The most viable method will be to focus on larger watersheds with larger populations of Southern California Steelhead.

Education of the public will be a key effort to recovery of this species. Public education as well as state and federal governments will need to be educated on its life history and role this species plays in the watersheds of California. Educating public landowners about best practices and methods to minimize their adverse effects on streams and rivers also will be important. State and local governments in planning and policy areas will also need to be educated in appropriate planning, such as preserving migration corridors and minimizing development along critical stream habitats. These actions can have positive effects on recovery of not only Southern California Steelhead, but on watersheds and habitat that many other species share as well. Coordination between agencies, such as the National Marine Fisheries Service student programs which recruits students to assist in issues such as this, as well as better communicating actions that can be taken at all levels of government and public organizations to better educate the public of this species and its life histories. This will allow for the public to be better informed as well as being able to provide information to government agencies on this species.

Within many of the watersheds where Southern California Steelhead currently occupy as well as those that were historically occupied are barriers to passage to critical spawning habitats. These barriers consist of dams and the reduction of water flow from storage and withdrawal, which in itself lowers base flow and impedes Southern California Steelhead from reaching spawning habitat as well as impedes juvenile Steelhead from reaching the Pacific Ocean. These problems can be alleviated in many ways, but not all are feasible. Dam modification is a route that can be taken, in which fish ladders or diversions are provided to allow Steelhead to reach breeding areas, as well as other operations such as “trap and truck”, where Steelhead are collected and moved above barriers. Dam removal is also another option, although not always feasible.

Stream flow is another issue that faces successful reproduction as well as movement of Southern California Steelhead. Reservoirs and water pumping from groundwater and lakes can reduce the necessary stream flow required for all stages of the Steelheads life. Managing water use will be beneficial to these fish. There are many methods that can be employed to achieve this objective. One method would be timing the drawdown or recharge of groundwater during spawning season, which can allow a higher base flow for passage of adults and juveniles. Reducing the number of dams and diversion of water can also have positive effects on stream flows, and, by releasing more water from behind dams during times of upstream and downstream migration can improve the numbers of fish reaching spawning areas. Much of the potential freshwater habitat for Southern California Steelhead is highly fragmented and unsuitable within its range. Most streams and rivers are heavily impaired by development and are located in densely populated areas but still hold habitat that has high potential to sustain the species. Connectivity of these habitats could allow the Steelhead to repopulate these areas, and would require that these streams receive adequate water.

The large human population of Southern California also contributes pollutants to important streams and habitat. Water quality is directly impacted by a variety of sources, such as fine sediments and chemical pollutants. Sediment pollution inputs degrade stream bed quality by filling aggregate that Southern California Steelhead need for spawning. These fine sediments can be mitigated by restoring and maintaining streamside riparian buffers, which can reduce the amount of fine sediment deposited into the water, as well as reduce the amount of chemical pollutants entering the stream.

Native fish hatcheries can also have good outcomes for the Southern California Steelhead. By collecting adults and rearing the young in hatcheries, it is possible to safeguard the species from extinction. Anthropogenic degradation and natural events in the Steelheads range can pose serious problems this species. Wildfires that Southern California experiences on a regular basis can completely destroy what little habitat they have left, and can completely extirpate populations from streams, either by the fire itself or mudslides that occur due to burnt areas along streams. Hatcheries can also repopulate restored streams faster than natural recruitment as well as supplement populations during years of low productivity.
