= Morrell Canyon Creek =

Stream in the American state of California

Morrell Canyon Creek Morrell Canyon
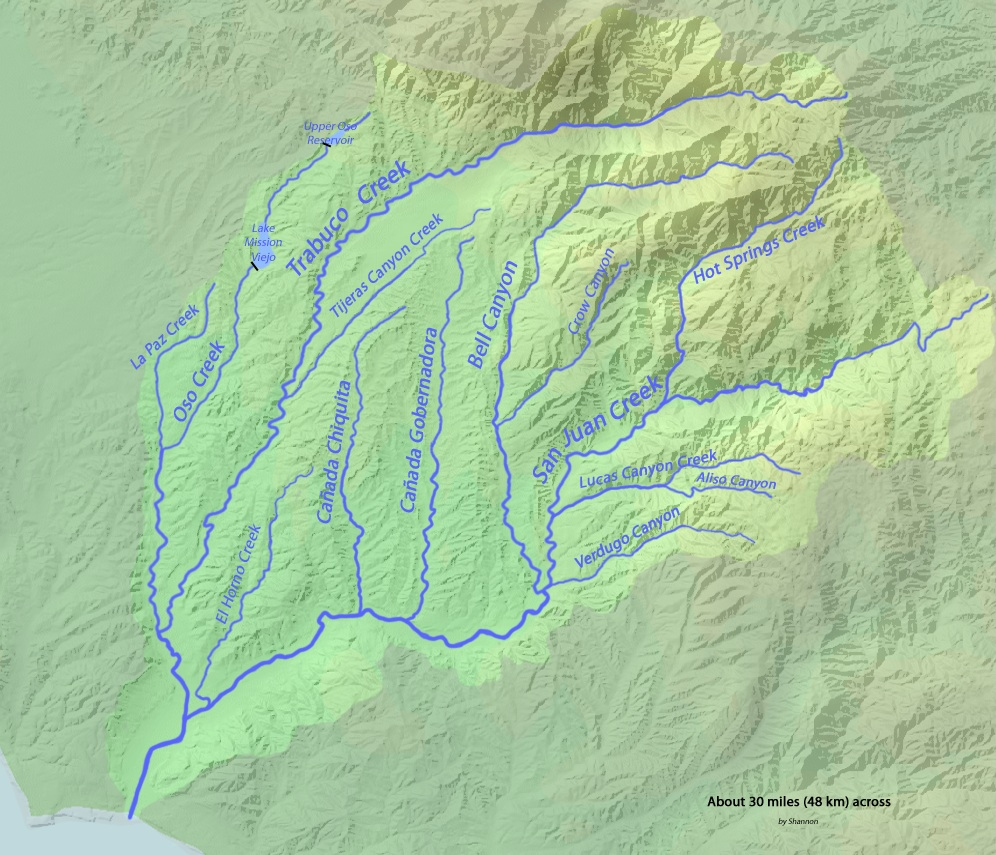
- Map of San Juan Creek watershed

Location
- Country: United States
- State: California
- Region: Riverside County

Physical characteristics
- Source: northeastern slope of San Mateo Peak, Elsinore Mountains
  - coordinates: 33°36′49″N 117°22′18″W
  - elevation: 3,080 ft (940 m)
- Mouth: head of San Juan Creek and San Juan Canyon, at the confluence of Morrell Canyon Creek with Bear Canyon Creek, Santa Ana Mountains
  - coordinates: 33°36′47″N 117°26′7″W
  - elevation: 1,690 ft (520 m)
- Length: 6.5 mi (10.5 km)
- Discharge
  - location: head of San Juan Creek and San Juan Canyon, at the confluence of Morrell Canyon Creek with Bear Canyon Creek, Santa Ana Mountains

Basin features
- Tributaries
  - left: East Fork, Morrell Canyon Creek, Decker Canyon Creek, Long Canyon Creek
  - right: Bear Canyon Creek

Morrell Canyon Creek is a stream or Arroyo, tributary to San Juan Creek, located in the Cleveland National Forest in Riverside County, California, at an elevation of 3,080 ft (939 m), in the Elsinore Mountains northeast of Elsinore Peak. It arises on the eastern slope of San Mateo Peak. An eastern fork draining the Morrell Potrero joins it a little over a mile north of its source and then flows northwestward about a third of a mile where it turns southeast descending the narrow Morrell Canyon east of Lion Spring. After descending 2.5 miles it turns north for half a mile then returns to a southwestern direction for another mile, the canyon widening here until it turns northwestward and down a steep canyon again for half a mile where it takes in from the right Decker Canyon Creek and Long Canyon Creek. It then turns southwestward again into a wider canyon and descends to its confluence with Bear Canyon Creek and becomes the head of San Juan Creek.
