= Redonda Mesa =

Mesa type formation in the American state of California

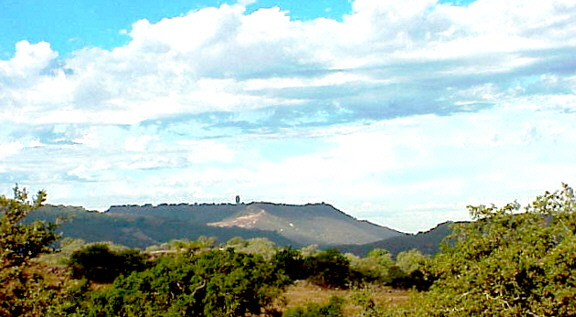
- View west to Redonda Mesa in the Santa Ana Mountains.

Highest point
- Elevation: 2,825 ft (861 m) NGVD 29
- Coordinates: 33°29′28″N 117°20′44″W

Geography
- Location within California Location within the United States
- Location: Riverside County, California
- Parent range: Santa Ana Mountains
- Topo map: USGS

Redonda Mesa is a mesa type formation located in the southern Santa Ana Mountains, near the Pacific Ocean in Southern California. It is located in an unincorporated area of southwestern Riverside County.

The highest point of Redonda Mesa is 2,825 feet (861 m) in elevation.

== Geography ==
Redonda Mesa lies near the Riverside-San Diego County Line, several miles northeast of Marine Corps Base Camp Pendleton and 11 miles (18 km) west of Temecula.

The views from atop the mesa on clear days can include:

- to the south, Oceanside, Fallbrook, De Luz and Bonsall.
- To the north, one can see more of the interior Santa Ana Mountains.
- To the east, the Temecula Valley is below, as well as Anza and the San Jacinto Mountains further east.
- to the west, Marine Corps Base Camp Pendleton with some of the last major undeveloped coastal land in Southern California, the Pacific Ocean, as well as Santa Catalina Island on very clear days, and one can see parts of coastal city San Clemente northwest in lower Orange County.

This mesa's natural areas are vegetated with flora of the Coastal sage scrub plant community, an increasingly endangered one in Southern California.

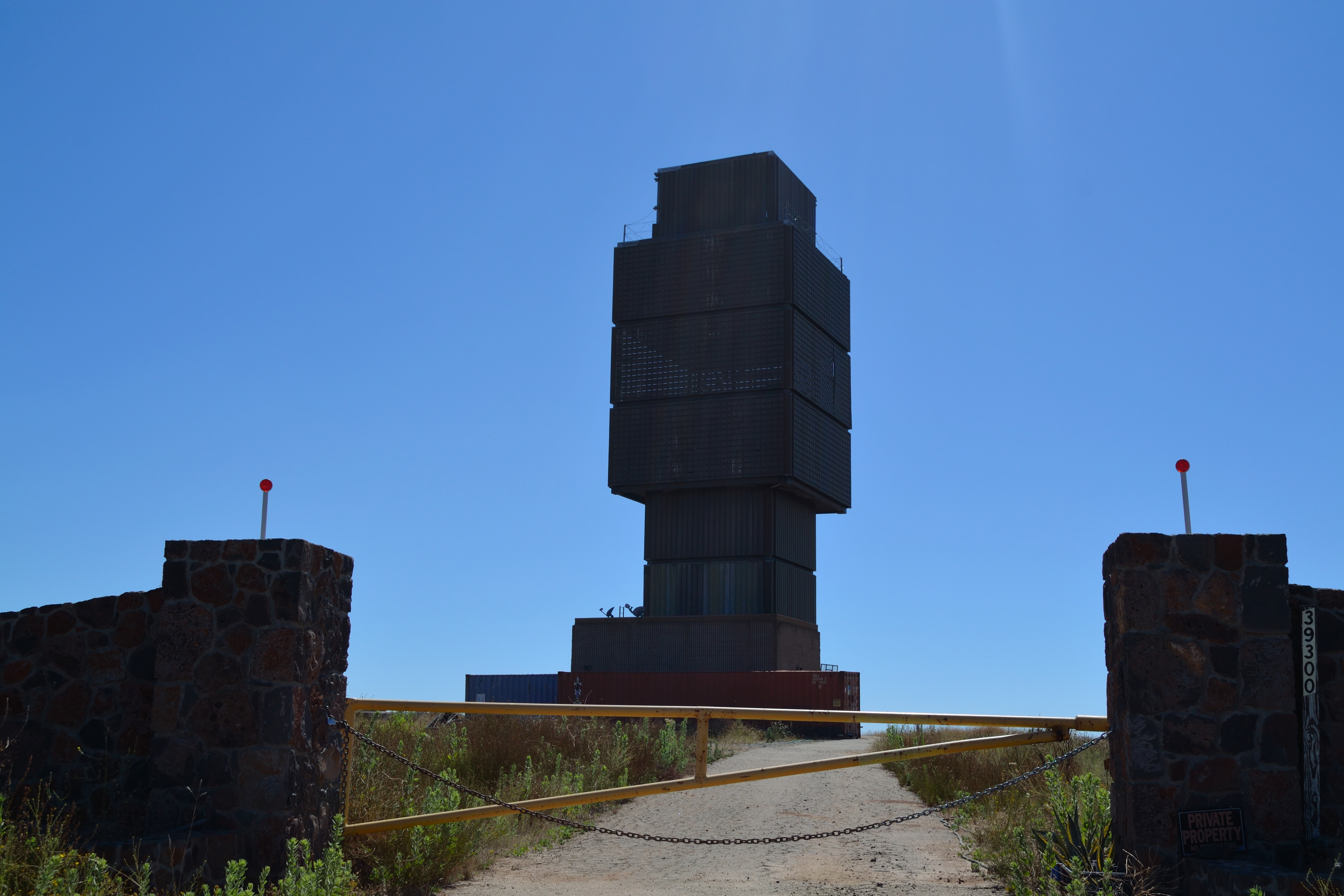
Closer view of the tower.

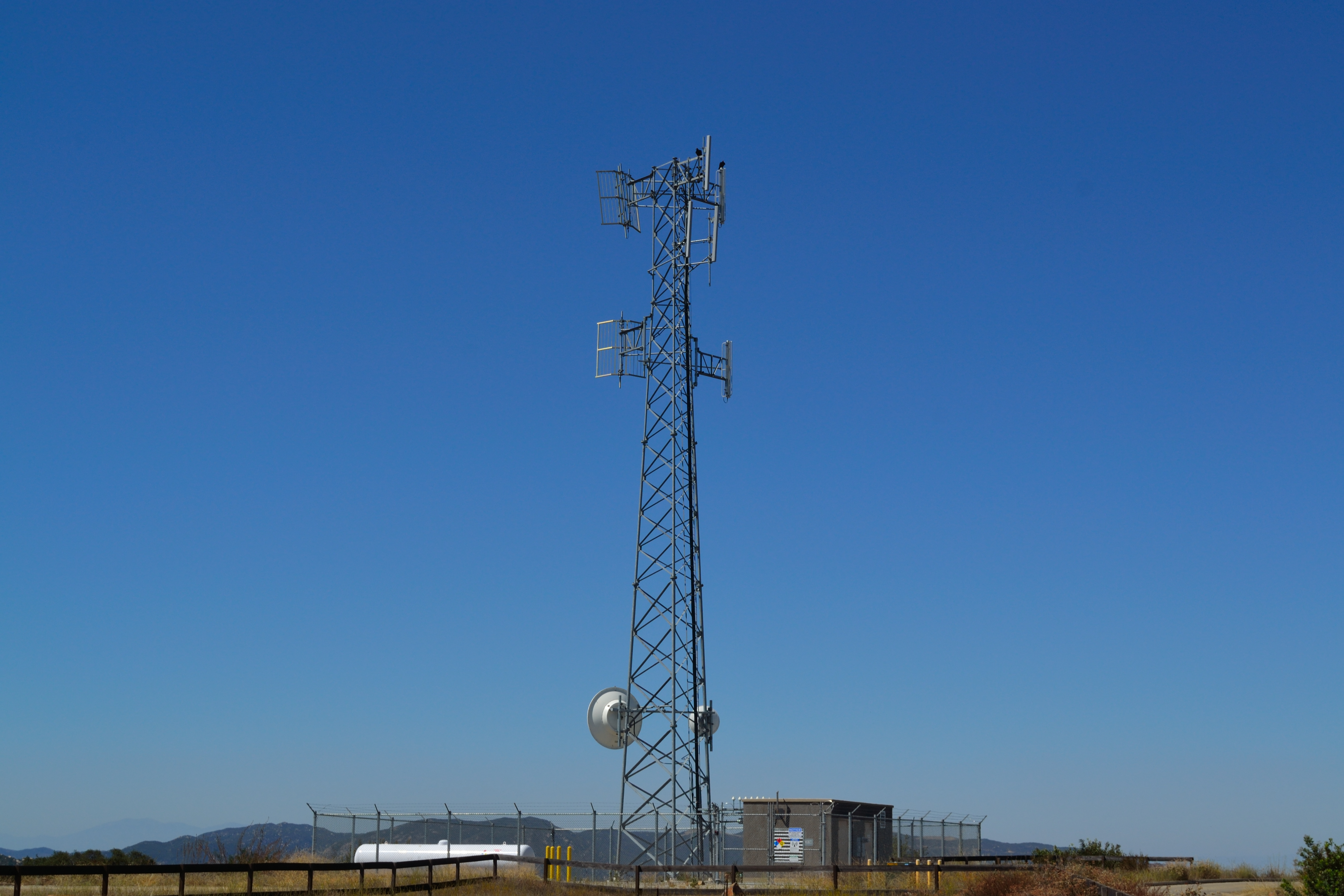
A radio or cellphone tower on top of the mesa, a recent addition to the mesa top, constructed around the year 2006.

== History ==
In the late 1960s the top of Redonda Mesa (along with several parcels in the valley below) was purchased from the Rancho California Land Company by Edward E. Sharp of Newport Beach, California, a leading real estate broker in the region.

During the 1970s, prior to the development of fiber optic transmission capabilities, the mesa's unrestricted views from San Diego County to Orange County made it the ideal location for a microwave relay station which was the backbone of telephone communications in the era. AT&T purchased 20 acres (81,000 m^{2}) on the top of Redonda Mesa from the Sharp Family Trust and in about 1981. The company built a 100-foot (30 m) high tower with numerous white "cones" pointed toward transmission and receiving stations in the Oceanside and San Clemente areas. The tower served the region for about a decade and then fell into disuse as new technologies took over.

Looking to divest itself of the surplus property, AT&T sold Redonda Mesa back to the Sharp Family Trust in 2002. The trust then sold it to Herbert Massinger, who remodeled the site's unique microwave relay tower into a newly-refurbished residence on 20 acres with ocean views of Catalina, San Clemente and the Coronado Islands off of Mexico on a clear day.

== Gallery ==
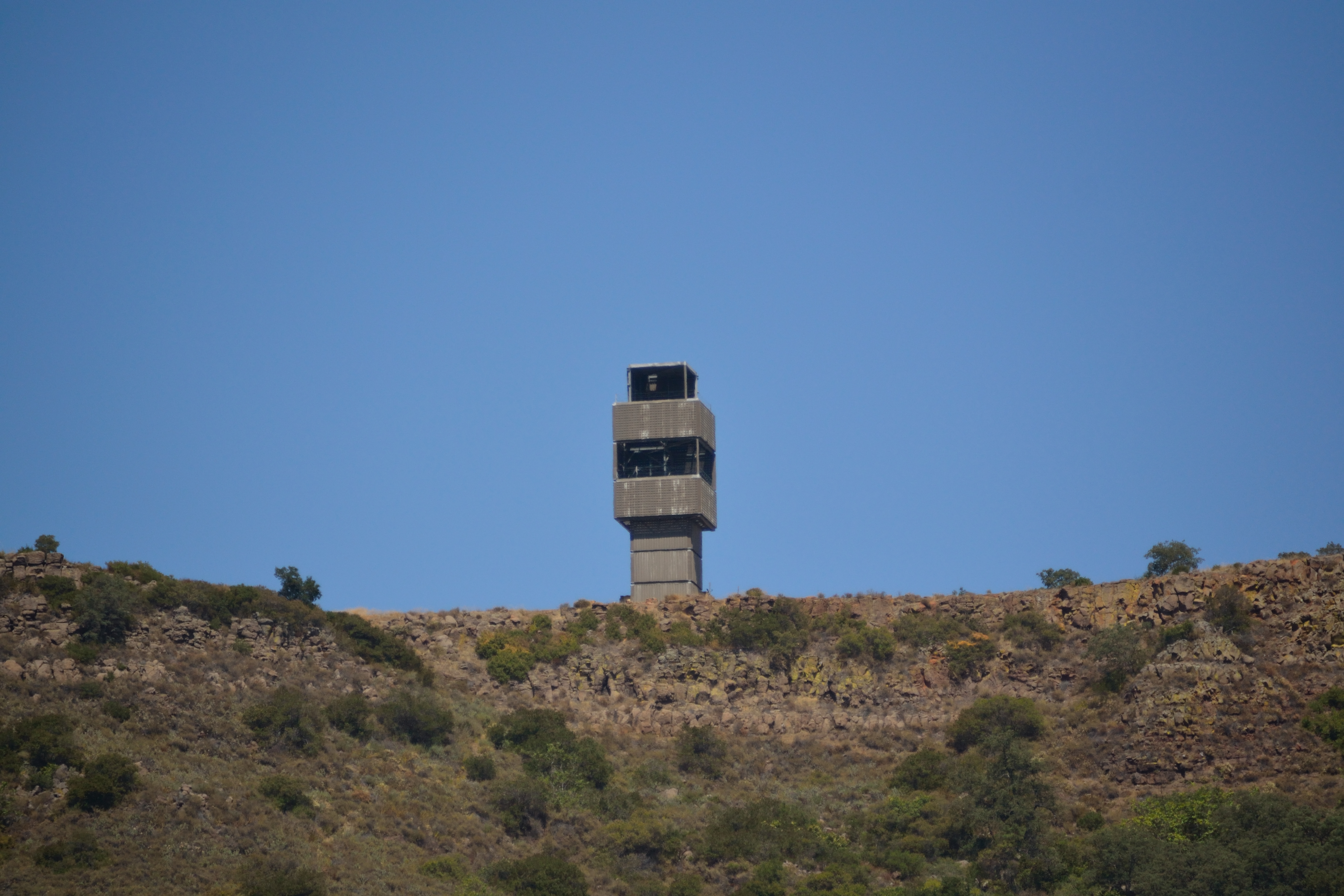
Microwave relay tower after the cones were removed

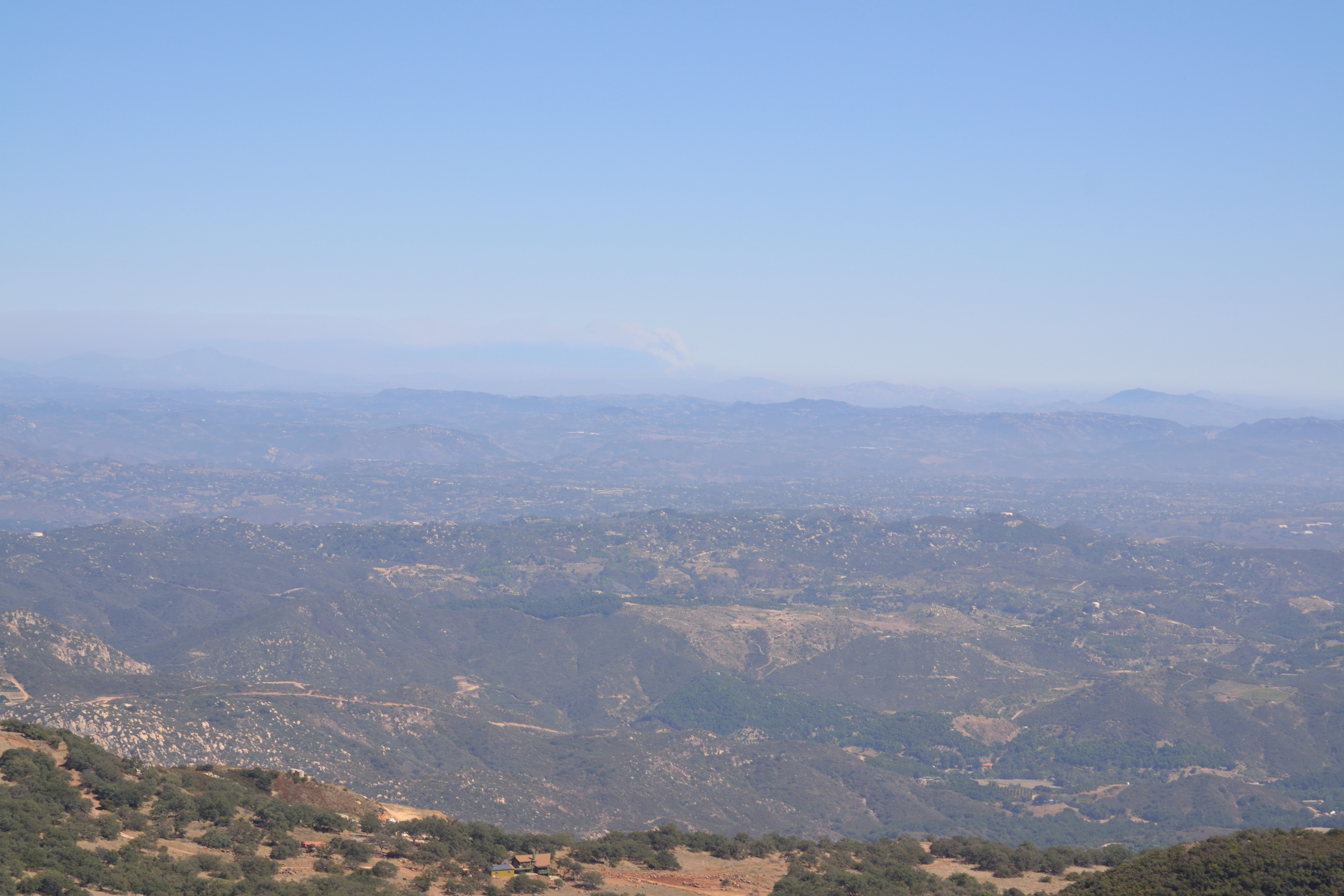
View to the south of northern San Diego County

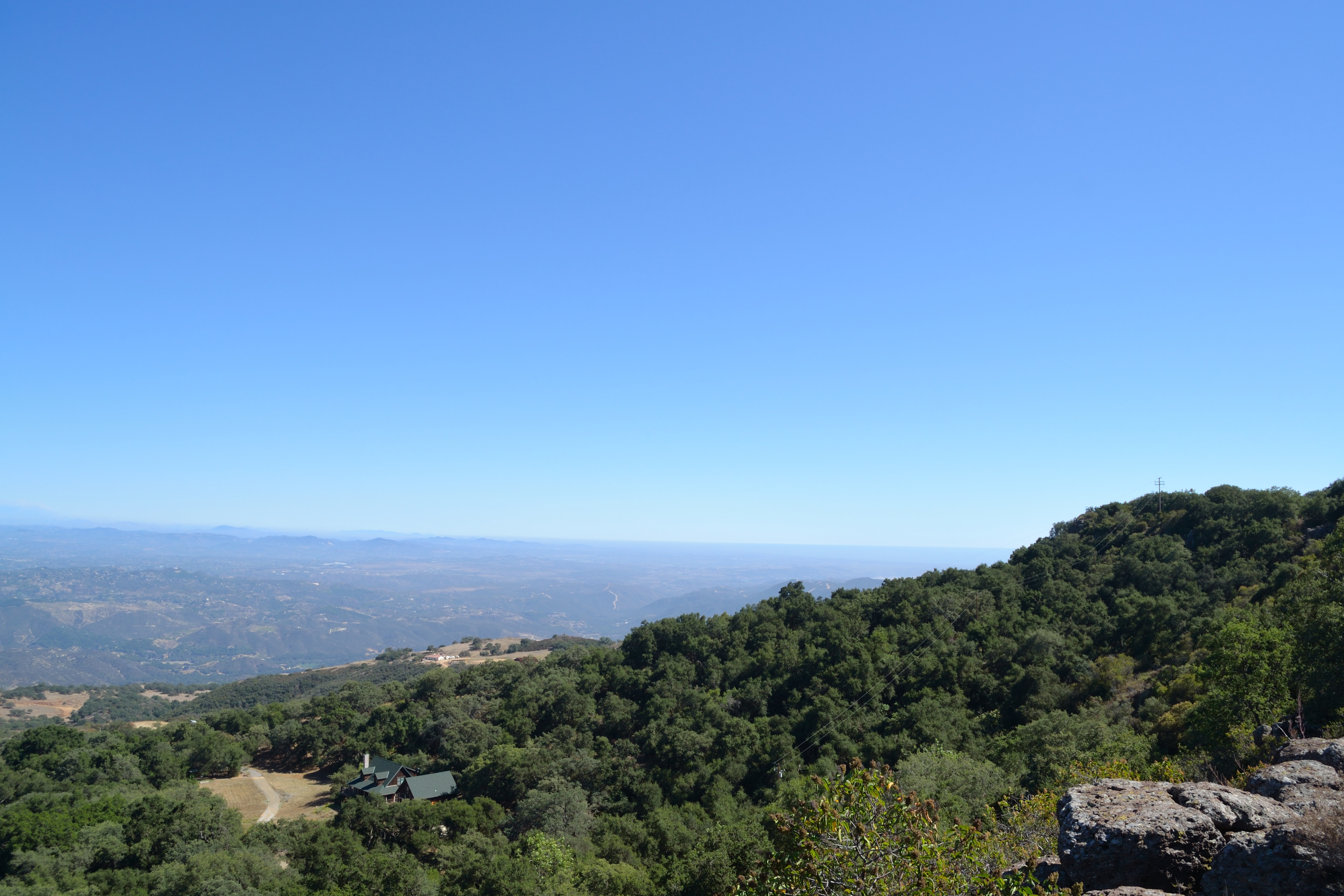
View southwest of Camp Pendleton and the Pacific Ocean

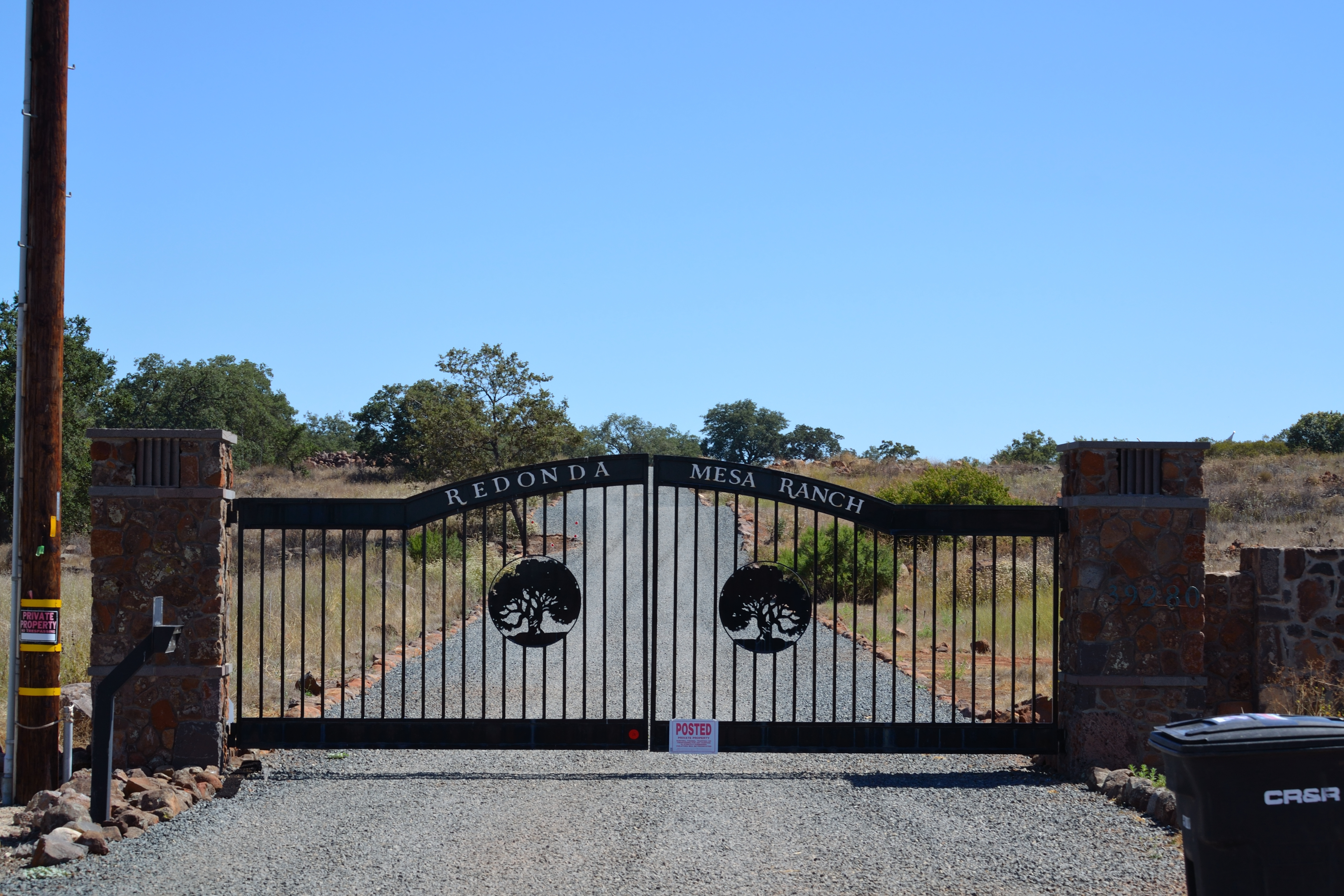
Redonda Mesa Ranch gate

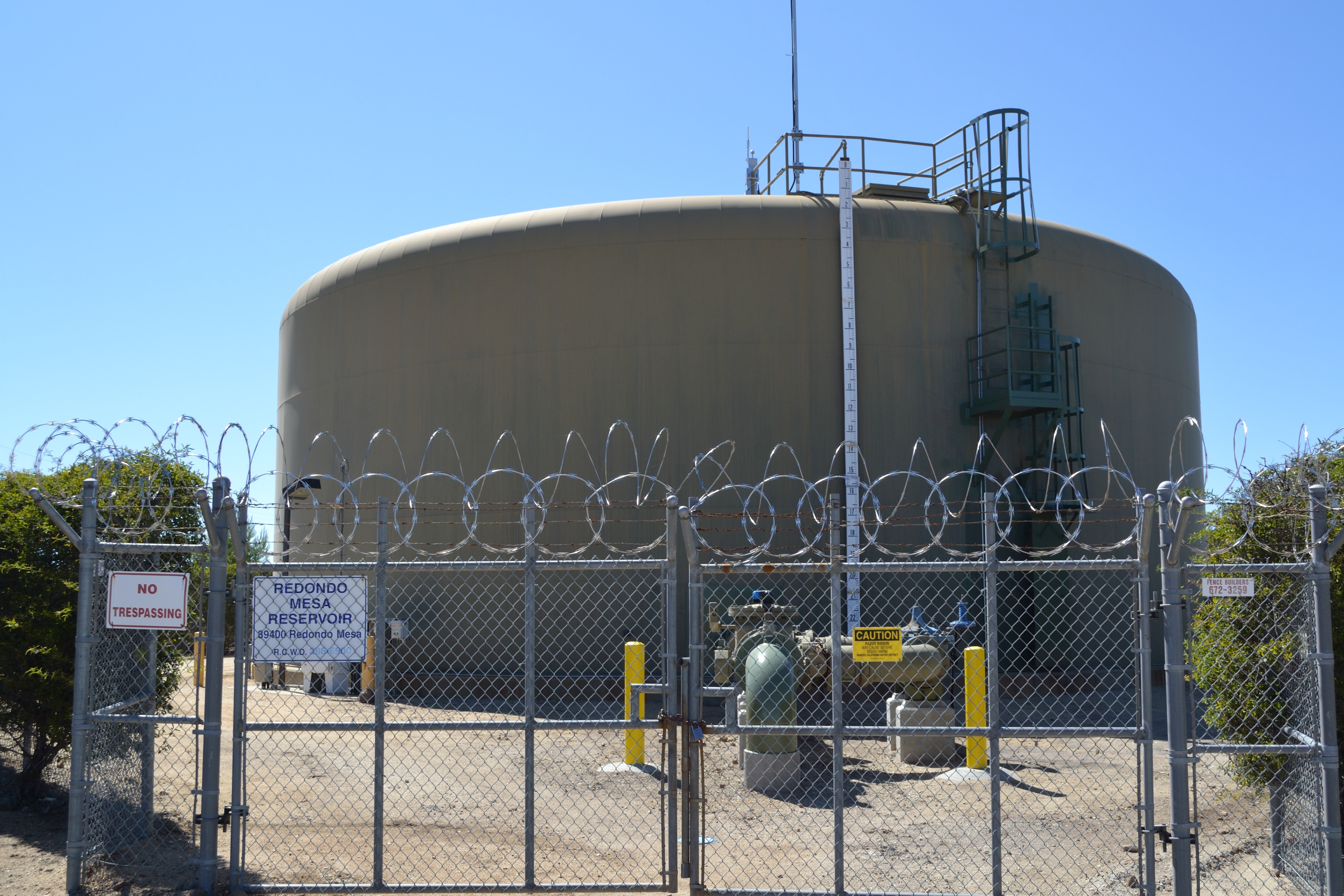
Water tank on the ranch
