= Morrell Potrero =

Flat in the Cleveland National Forest, California, United States

Coordinates: 33°36′54″N 117°21′27″W

Morrell Potrero is a flat located in the Cleveland National Forest in Riverside County, California. It has an elevation of approximately 3,041 ft (927 m) in the Elsinore Mountains northwest of Elsinore Peak. It is drained by Morrell Canyon Creek, a tributary of San Juan Creek.

== History ==
Originally the site of the Morrell Ranch, the Morrell Potrero is now the site of Rancho Capistrano, a private, gated community surrounded by the Cleveland National Forest.
