= San Onofre State Beach =

State park in California, United States

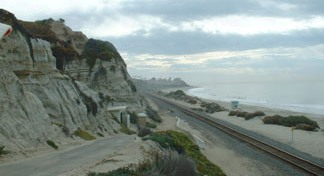

- Location within California Location within the United States
- Location: San Diego County, California
- Nearest city: San Clemente
- Coordinates: 33°22′45″N 117°34′21″W
- Area: 3,000-acre (1,214 ha)
- Governing body: California Department of Parks and Recreation

San Onofre State Beach (San Onofre, Spanish for "St. Onuphrius") is a 3,000-acre (1,214 ha) state park in San Diego County, California. The beach is 3 miles (5 km) south of San Clemente on Interstate 5 at Basilone Road. The state park is leased to the state of California by the United States Marine Corps. Governor Ronald Reagan established San Onofre State Beach in 1971. With over 2.5 million visitors per year, it is one of the five most-visited state parks in California, hosting swimmers, campers, kayakers, birders, fishermen, bicyclists, sunbathers, surfers, and the sacred Native American site of Panhe.

== History ==
Panhe at San Onofre is an Acjachemen village that is over 8,000 years old and a current sacred, ceremonial, cultural, and burial site for the Acjachemen people. Many Acjachemen people trace their lineage back to Panhe. It is the site of the first baptism in California, and in 1769 saw the first close contact between Spanish explorers, Catholic missionaries, and the Acjachemen people. The United Coalition to Protect Panhe and The City Project advocate for the preservation of the site. In keeping with the Padres’ tradition of naming areas after patron saints, this area was named after the 4th-century Egyptian hermit, St. Onuphrius.

In the period of Mexican California, the area of the current state beach belonged to the Rancho de San Onofrio, part of the larger ranch holdings of Pio Pico, the last Mexican governor of California. This Mexican era ranch later belonged to the Forster, Flood and O'Neill families, during which time the land around San Onofre Creek was called Forster City, with a population of roughly 175 in 1880. The town declined in size but the property was important enough for the Santa Fe Railroad to build a train station called San Onofre in 1888.

In the early 1900s, the O'Neills leased the area around the San Onofre train station to Norm Haven, where he oversaw the production of beans, melons, lettuce, and other winter crops. A majority of the roughly 150 or so residents of the ranch were either Hispanic or Japanese-American laborers. The Haven' Ranch area included at least one Catholic Church, a school, and travelers along the Coast Highway (completed in 1929) could stop at Frank Ulrich's cafe and service station. During World War II, most of the Japanese-American laborers left or were evacuated in response to President Roosevelt's Order 9066. Two residents of Haven's Ranch, Fred and Kajiro Oyama, would later be involved in a U.S. Supreme Court Case (Oyama v. State of California, 1948) that began to strike down California's laws banning people of Japanese descent from owning land. Haven's Ranch was slowly turned over to the marines at Camp Pendleton over the course of the 1950s. The village that once existed in the San Onofre creek area was demolished to make way for the I-5 freeway in 1960, though the Marines established housing in the hills to the north of the former train stop starting in the 1970s.

On November 10, 2016, the Transportation Corridor Agency abandoned plans to build a six-lane toll highway through San Onofre State Beach, other nearby sensitive environmental areas, and certain Native American cultural sites. The announcement brings to an end more than 10 years of effort to build through these areas. The abandonment of this route for the toll road was part of an agreement ending several lawsuits filed by the California attorney general and a coalition of environmental groups that sought to block the project.

== Park attractions ==
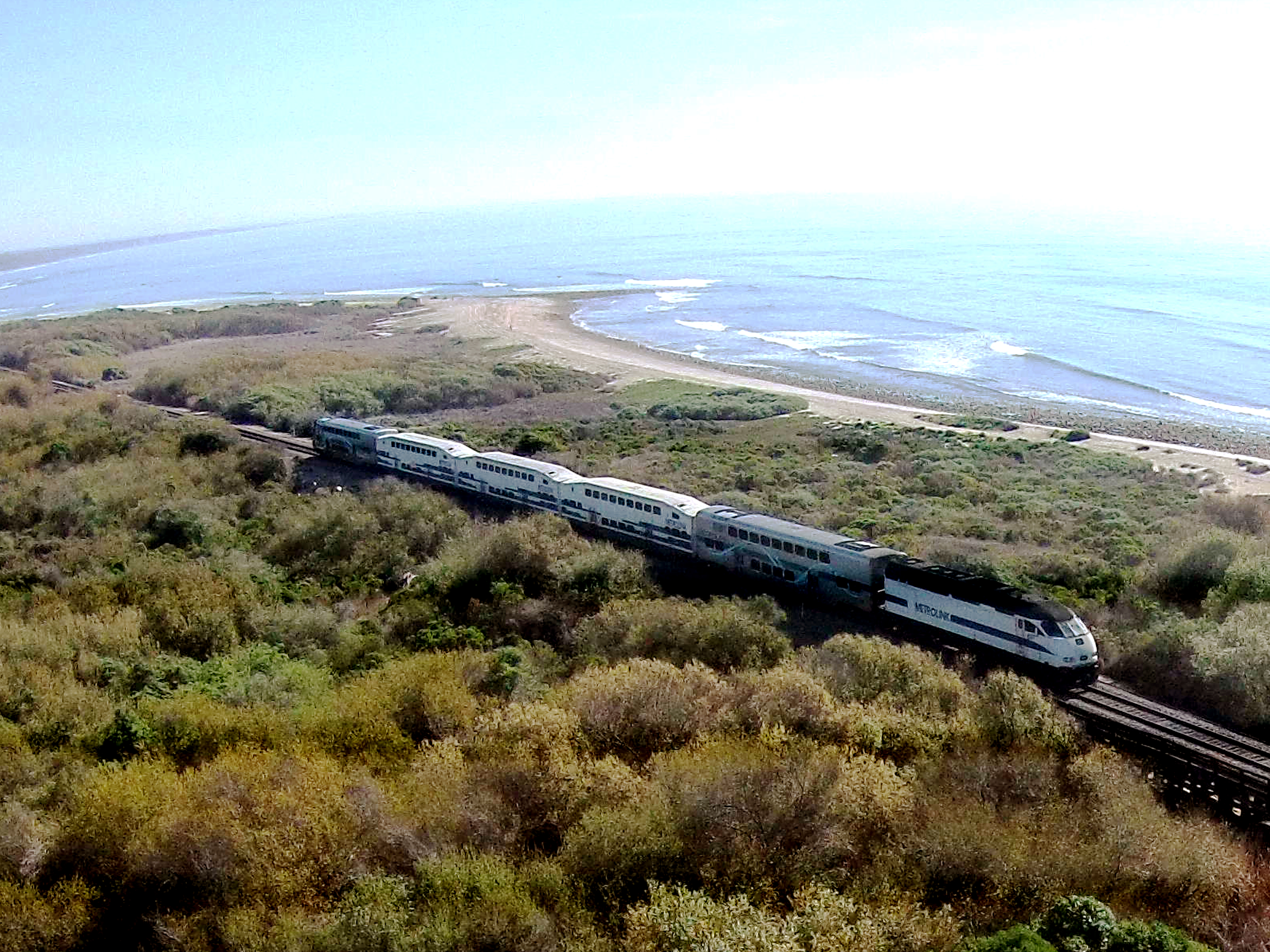
The rail line for which Trestles is named

The San Onofre Bluffs portion of San Onofre State Beach features 3.5 miles (5.6 km) of sandy beaches with six access trails cut into the bluff above. The campground is along the old U.S. Route 101 adjacent to the sandstone bluffs. San Onofre includes San Onofre Bluffs and Beach areas; San Onofre Surf Beach, a day-use facility; San Mateo campgrounds and day-use facility; and Trestles, accessible via a nature trail from San Mateo Campgrounds. Alcohol is banned from all beaches within the park.

The park includes a marshy area where San Mateo Creek meets the shoreline and Trestles, a surfing site. Whales, dolphins, and sea lions can be seen offshore. The park's coastal terrace is chaparral-covered.

=== Surfing ===
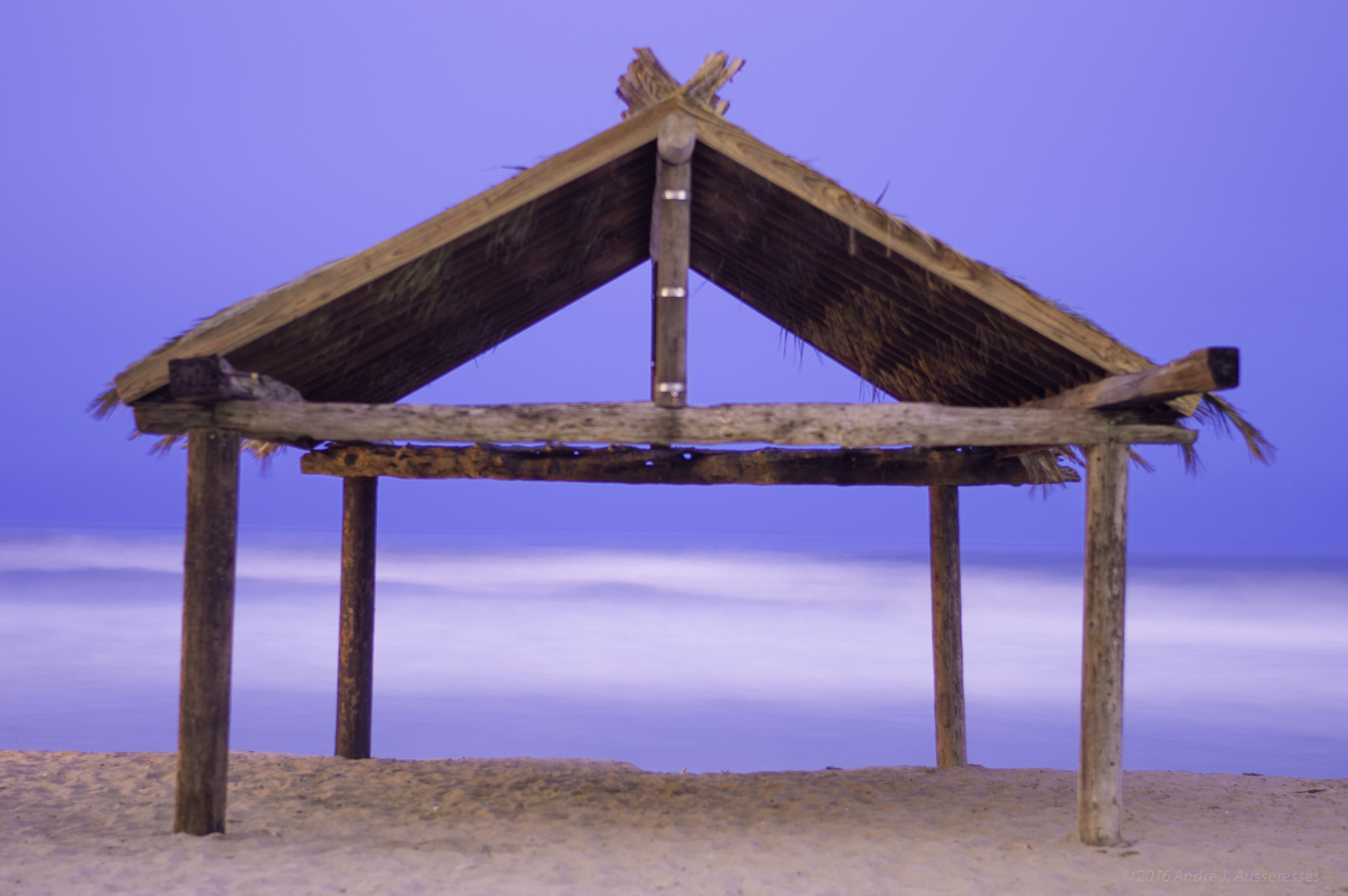
After Sunset

A surfing and fishing camp had been there since the 1920s, before the U.S. government established Camp Pendleton, a U.S. Marine training camp during World War II. Surfers using redwood boards have visited San Onofre since at least the 1940s, including Lorrin "Whitey" Harrison, Don Okey, Al Dowden, Tom Wilson, and Bob Simmons.

San Onofre has several surf breaks on its 3.5 miles (5.6 km) of coast:

- Trestles, a world-famous surfing area known for its consistent waves; site of 2028 Summer Olympics surfing competitions
- Church, near Camp Pendleton's beach resort, provides sunbathing and duck watching
- Surf Beach, divided into three breaks spots known as The Point, Old Man's, and Dogpatch
- Trails, the southernmost surf spot in this region, includes both rock bottom and sandy breaks

=== Former nude beach ===
Nudity is prohibited at all parts of San Onofre State Beach, A traditional "clothing optional area" was formerly at the extreme south end of San Onofre Bluffs beach, accessed via Trail number 6. Since March 2010, park rangers have been citing park visitors for nudity, following the 2009 defeat of a legal challenge by a nudist group.

=== Nuclear station ===
Between San Onofre Bluffs and San Onofre Surf Beach is the San Onofre Nuclear Generating Station (SONGS), which was shut down in June 2013.

== In popular culture ==
- "San Onofre" and "Trestles" are both mentioned in the 1963 Beach Boys' song "Surfin' U.S.A."
- San Onofre in the post-apocalyptic future is the principal setting of Kim Stanley Robinson's first novel, The Wild Shore.

== See also ==
- List of beaches in California
- List of California state parks
