= El Cariso, California =

Unincorporated community in California, United States

Coordinates: 33°38′11″N 117°25′13″W

El Cariso is an unincorporated community in Riverside County, California. It lies along the Ortega Highway, just west of where it crosses the crest of the Santa Ana Mountains a few miles southwest of Lake Elsinore. It lies within the Trabuco District of the Cleveland National Forest. El Cariso Campground is north of the town across the highway from the El Cariso Fire Station.

== History ==
El Cariso is believed to be near the location of the mountain hideout of Juan Flores, the leader of the Flores Daniel Gang. Located just over the county line in Riverside County, its mountain meadows provided a safe place to keep horses stolen in Los Angeles and San Bernardino Counties outside the jurisdiction of their Sheriff before they were driven elsewhere to be sold.

It is one of the sites believed to be the location of the 1857 shootout between the gang and a large posse from Los Angeles, and Temecula that found then killed or captured many of the gang.

In September 2024, the community was heavily impacted by the Airport Fire, destroying dozens of homes in the area.
