= Elsinore Peak =

Mountain in California, United States

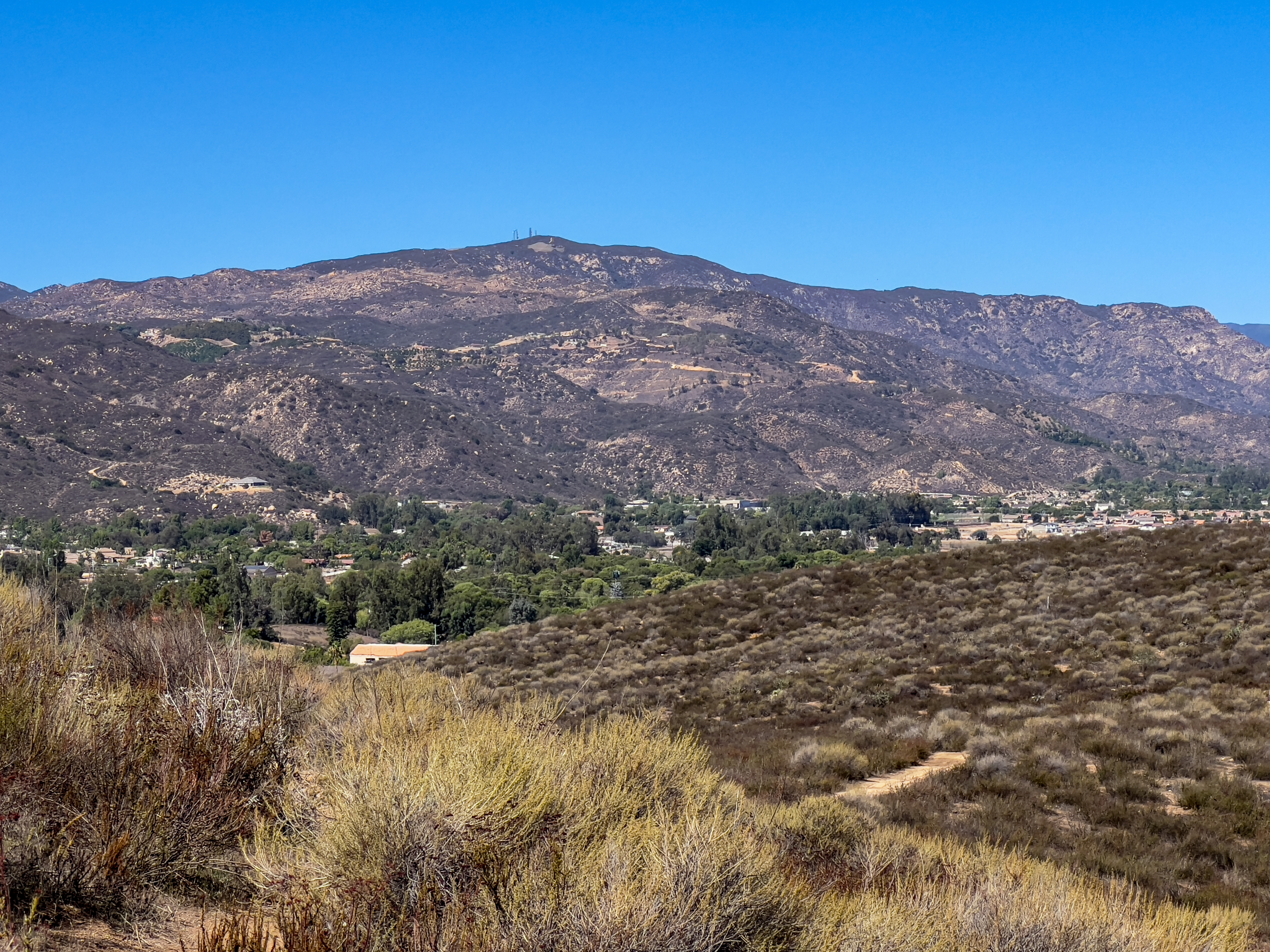
- Elsinore Peak viewed from Wildomar, California

Highest point
- Elevation: 3,575 ft (1,090 m) NAVD 88
- Prominence: 435 ft (133 m)
- Coordinates: 33°36′09″N 117°20′36″W

Geography
- Location within California
- Location: Riverside County, California, U.S.
- Parent range: Elsinore Mountains in the Santa Ana Mountain Range
- Topo map: USGS Wildomar

Geology
- Mountain type: Granitic

Elsinore Peak is a named 3,575-foot (1,090 m) summit, at the southern end of the mountain ridge running southeast from the vicinity east of El Cariso in the Elsinore Mountains, in Riverside County, California in the United States.
