= Santiago Creek =

Santiago Creek Cañada de Madera
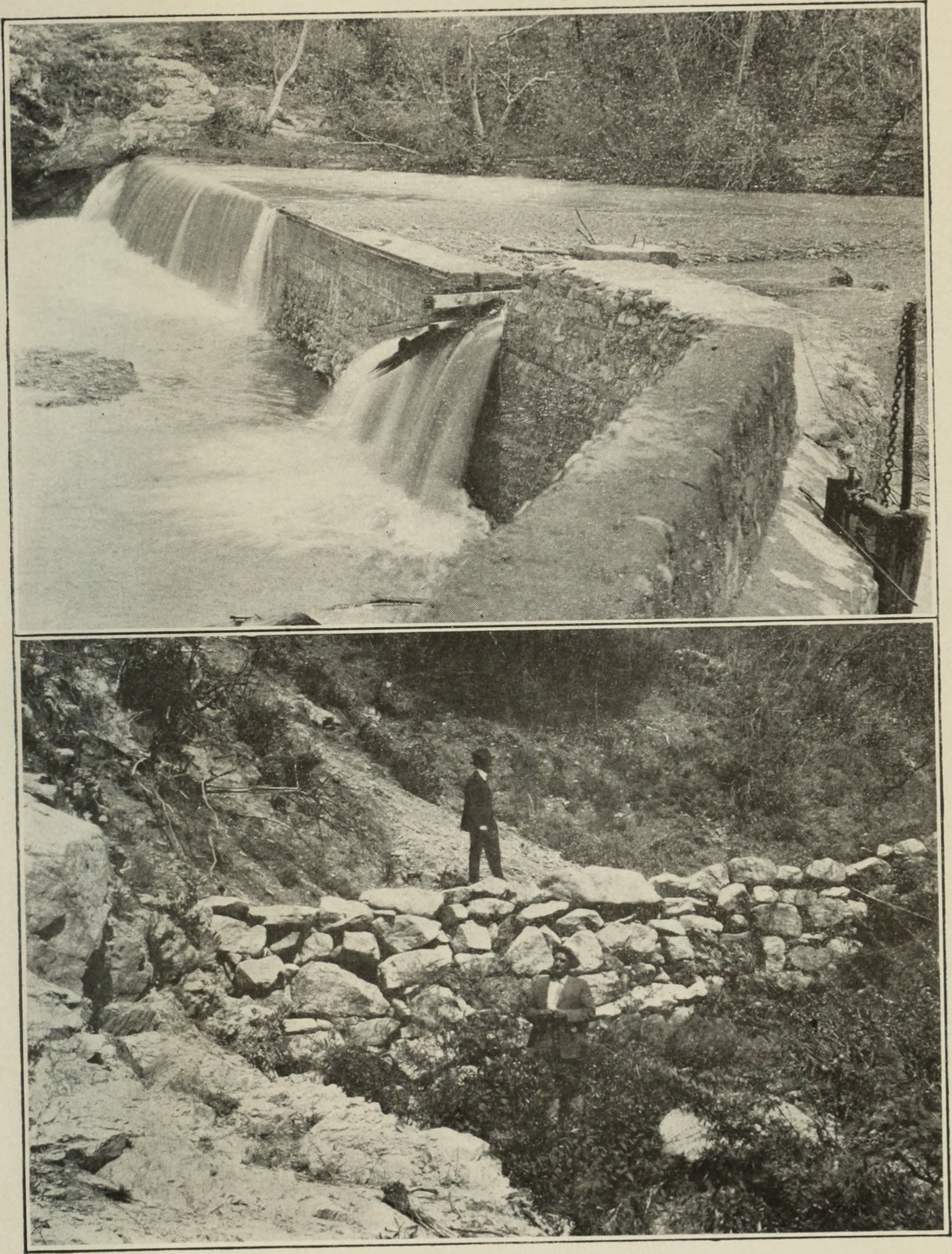
- Low rock dam on Santiago Creek in Irvine Regional Park (c. 1917)

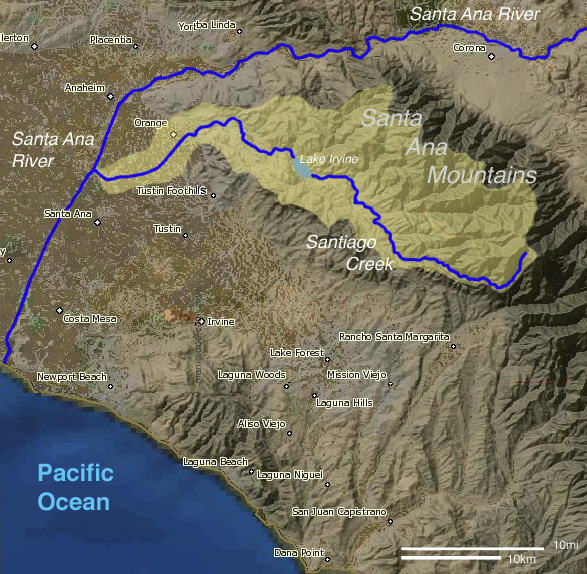
- Map of the Santiago Creek watershed and surroundings

Location
- Country: United States
- State: California
- County: Orange
- District: Cleveland National Forest
- Municipality: Orange

Physical characteristics
- Source: Santiago Peak
  - location: Cleveland National Forest
  - coordinates: 33°42′58″N 117°32′21″W
  - elevation: 4,870 ft (1,480 m)
- Mouth: Santa Ana River
  - location: Santa Ana
  - coordinates: 33°46′11″N 117°53′27″W
  - elevation: 108 ft (33 m)
- Length: 34 mi (55 km)
- Basin size: 100.6 sq mi (261 km^{2})
- Discharge
  - location: Villa Park
  - average: 6.3 cu ft/s (0.18 m^{3}/s)
  - minimum: 0 cu ft/s (0 m^{3}/s)
  - maximum: 11,000 cu ft/s (310 m^{3}/s)

Basin features
- Tributaries
  - left: Limestone Canyon, Handy Creek
  - right: Silverado Canyon, Harding Canyon, Baker Canyon, Black Star Canyon, Fremont Canyon (Orange County, California), Weir Canyon

Santiago Creek is a major watercourse in Orange County in the U.S. state of California. About 34 miles (55 km) long, it drains most of the northern Santa Ana Mountains and is a tributary to the Santa Ana River. It is one of the longest watercourses entirely within the county. The creek shares its name with Santiago Peak, at 5,687 ft (1,733 m) the highest point in Orange County, on whose slopes its headwaters rise.

The Santiago Creek watershed covers about 100.6 square miles (261 km^{2}) in northern Orange County. The upper part of the creek is free-flowing, while the lower section is urbanized and includes parts of the cities of Tustin, Orange, and Santa Ana. Below the Villa Park Dam the creek is mostly channelized and flows only during heavy winter storms.

Historically the Santiago Creek provided water for the Tongva people, whose territory extended over much of northern present-day Orange County and into the Los Angeles Basin. Native Americans have inhabited the Santiago Creek and Santa Ana River watershed for up to 12,000 years. The creek was named by the Spanish Gaspar de Portolá expedition of 1769, which crossed the Santa Ana River near where it meets the Santiago Creek. In the 1870s there was a short-lived silver boom along the tributary Silverado Creek. In 1929 the Santiago Dam was built to form Irvine Lake, to supply irrigation water. Pipelines from Irvine Lake still contribute a small amount of water to the municipality of Villa Park.

== Course ==
Santiago Creek rises in the Cleveland National Forest from Jamison Spring, between Santiago Peak and Modjeska Peak, which together form the prominent Saddleback of the Santa Ana Mountains. The creek immediately passes through Old Camp, a historic Boy Scout Camp. The creek runs West toward Portola Hills before turning Northwest towards Anaheim. Once out of the national forest it passes through the town of Modjeska and meets the first major tributary, Harding Canyon Creek, from the right. The creek's perennial surface flows are limited to this upper stretch; below here the water flows underground except during the wet season of winter and early spring. Past the first Santiago Canyon Road crossing, the gorge widens to a broad alluvial plain, where the valley walls pull away and decrease in height. Downstream, it receives Williams and Silverado Creeks, then Baker and Black Star Creeks, all from the right.

The creek then empties into Irvine Lake, which is also fed by Limestone Canyon, a left-bank tributary. The 700-acre (280 ha) reservoir is formed by the 110-foot (34 m) Santiago Dam, located at its north end. Irvine Lake provides water to Villa Park and Orange via a pipeline and flume to Peters Canyon Reservoir. Because the flume diverts the creek's entire flow, the creek below the dam is dry except during floods. Below the dam the dry riverbed meets Fremont Canyon, a right bank tributary, and crosses underneath California State Route 241. It then flows northwest, bisecting Irvine Regional Park, and receives Weir Canyon Creek from the right. Near Villa Park, the Villa Park Dam forms a flood control reservoir to control spills from Irvine Lake. Below Villa Park, the creek flows through Santiago Oaks Regional Park where the Historic Dam, a groundwater impoundment, forces groundwater up to the surface into a natural riparian channel. Below the Park, the creek is confined to a flood control channel for the remaining 7 miles (11 km) of its course. Flowing roughly southwest between the cities of Orange and Santa Ana, it receives Handy Creek from the left, then enters a narrow sandstone canyon after the Canon Street Bridge. The canyon floes into the Santiago Creek Recharge Basin, then continues under California State Route 55 and 22, through Hart Memorial Park and Santiago Creek Park. Because the creek is dry most of the year, portions of the river bed are used as parking lots when conditions permit. The creek then crosses under Interstate 5 and continues west toward the Santa Ana River. Its confluence is on the river's left bank, inside the Riverview Golf Course. About 10 miles (16 km) below the confluence with Santiago Creek, the Santa Ana River enters the Pacific Ocean at Huntington Beach.

== Watershed ==
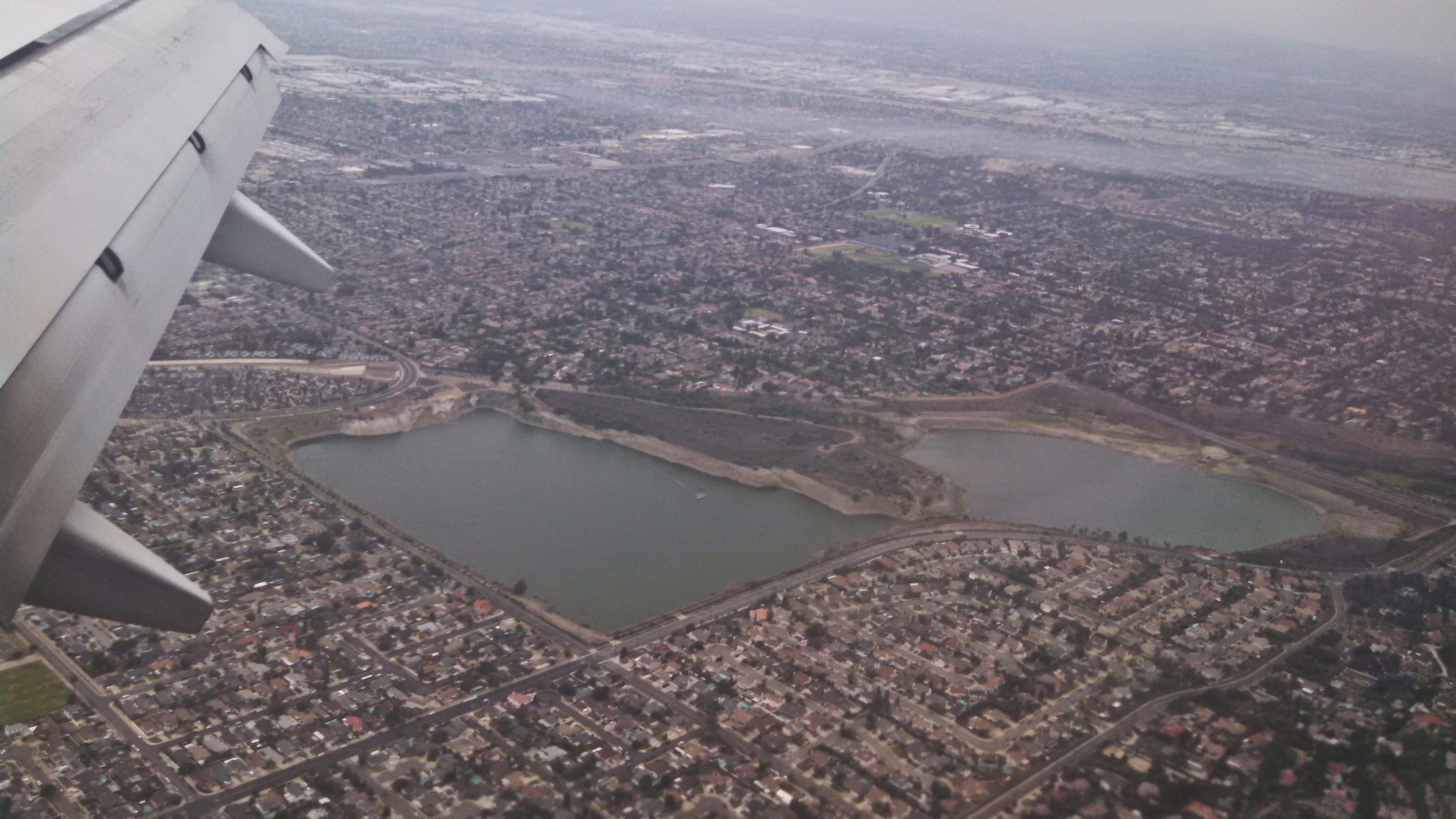
Santiago Creek Recharge Basin, for recharging groundwater

The Santiago Creek watershed occupies much of the northwestern end of the Santa Ana Mountains, and is located generally north of the city of Irvine. It is bounded on the south by the San Diego Creek, Aliso Creek and Oso Creek drainage areas, on the southeast by the Trabuco Creek watershed, and on the north and west by tributaries of the Santa Ana River. At 100.6 square miles (261 km^{2}) in size, the Santiago Creek watershed makes up about 3.6% of the entire 2,400-square-mile (6,200 km^{2}) Santa Ana River watershed - but makes up about 65.7% of the 153.2 square miles (397 km^{2}) of Santa Ana River watershed within Orange County, and 10.6% of 948-square-mile (2,460 km^{2}) Orange County. Most of the watershed is unincorporated, but about a third lies within Anaheim, Villa Park, Orange, and Santa Ana.

Elevations in the watershed range from 5,687 feet (1,733 m) at Santiago Peak to 108 feet (33 m) at the Santa Ana River confluence. Although only tiny parts of the Santiago Creek watershed do not lie within Orange County, it closely borders Riverside and San Bernardino counties. The Santa Ana Mountains rise higher on the right bank of the creek (the north bank) than on the left (south) bank, and parts of the northernmost course of the creek run through the Puente Hills.

The major tributary watersheds, in order of their appearance from southeast to northwest (roughly in downstream order) are: Harding Canyon, Williams Canyon, Silverado Canyon, Ladd Canyon (tributary of Silverado Canyon), Baker Canyon, Black Star Canyon, Fremont Canyon, Blind Canyon, and Weir Canyon on the right bank; and Limestone Canyon and Handy Creek on the left bank. Of the right bank tributaries, the Silverado Canyon, Ladd Canyon and Fremont Canyon sub-watersheds each extend a little into Riverside County. The Silverado/Ladd Canyon subwatershed is the largest, and Williams Canyon is the smallest.

=== Tributaries ===
Santiago Creek has 10 major tributaries along its course, most of which come in while the creek flows through Santiago Canyon. Fremont Canyon is the longest, while Silverado Canyon is by area the largest. The largest sub-tributary watershed is Ladd Canyon, a tributary of Silverado Canyon. Many of the upper tributaries are spring-fed and perennial. An uppercase R stands for right bank, and L is for left bank.

Tributary name	Length		Size
Denomination	Miles	Kilometers	Rank
Headwaters
Harding Canyon (R)	3.5	5.6	6
Williams Canyon (R)	1.3	2.1	10
Silverado Canyon (R)	10.8	17.3	1
Ladd Canyon (Silverado Canyon tributary) (R)	4.2	6.7	4
Baker Canyon (R)	5.5	8.9	8
Black Star Canyon (R)	8.5	13.7	3
Lake Irvine
Limestone Canyon (L)	8.7	14.0	5
Santiago Creek Dam
Fremont Canyon (R)	12.0	19.3	2
Blind Canyon (R)	2.4	3.9	11
Weir Canyon (R)	4.6	7.4	9
Handy Creek (L)	6.0	9.65	7
Confluence with the Santa Ana River

== Geology ==
The dominant geological feature in the Santiago Creek watershed are the Santa Ana Mountains. The northern portion of the mountains, which Santiago Creek drains, is composed of rocks from the pre-Triassic to the Quaternary (251–2.6 MYA). These rocks consist primarily of slate, sandstone, conglomerate, limestone, and other sedimentary rocks. The uplift of the Santa Ana Mountains began approximately 5.5 million years ago along the Elsinore Fault Zone, which extends north from near its namesake Lake Elsinore area.

== History ==
=== Pre-19th century ===
Before the latter 19th century, Santiago Creek and its tributaries were free flowing perennial streams spilling out of Santa Ana Mountains canyons onto the broad, alluvial floodplain. The creek wound on the plain for the rest of its course to its confluence with the Santa Ana River. coast live oaks (Quercus agrifolia), California sycamores (Platanus racemosa), white alders (Alnus rhombifolia), native willows (Salix species), and other riparian habitat vegetation lined the route of the creek and its primary tributaries. The creek and adjacent habitats supported a wide variety of birds, amphibians, fish, insects, and mammals.

==== Native Americans ====
Most of the creek originally lay in the territory of the Acjachemen and the Tongva peoples, two large Native American groups of present-day Orange, Los Angeles, and San Diego Counties. The Acjachemen lived to the south, and the Tongva to the north, of the southwest-running Aliso Creek that flows to the Pacific in an area southeast of the Santiago Creek watershed. An Acjachemen-Tongva boundary terminated at the Aliso Creek headwaters, but it is uncertain where the boundary was that divided Santiago Creek within the native territories. Archaeological evidence suggests that the upper portions of the creek were settled by Native Americans, and some historical accounts including those of the Spanish settlers, mention the Acjachemen lived in the canyon of upper Santiago Creek.

These first inhabitants of the Santiago Creek Canyon lived in semi-permanent villages close to running water. The upper canyon was in the Acjachemen homelands, while the lower (northwestern) part of the watershed, likely downstream of present-day Irvine Lake, was in the Tongva homelands. The Native Americans had been drawn to the area by the abundant riparian zone found along Santiago Creek and some of its perennial tributaries. They subsisted on a diet of primarily acorns, using the ground acorn powder to form a type of porridge known as atole. They ground the acorns in stone mortars carved into large boulders and rock formations, with some remaining in the creek's canyon areas.

==== Spanish colonization ====
In 1769 the Spanish Portolá expedition, first European land exploration of Alta California, traveled northwest along the southern edge of the Santa Ana Mountains. They camped near where Santiago Creek emerges from the mountains on July 27, and near the Santa Ana River on July 28. Padre Juan Crespi noted in his diary that the creek was named for the Apostle Santiago el Mayor".

Later Spaniards named the creek's canyon Cañada de Madera (timber canyon). The mountain whose southwestern flank is the creek's headwaters, known as Kalawpa by the indigenous peoples, was renamed Santiago Peak, after the creek.

The Spanish left accounts mentioning the Juaneño, the name given to the Acjachemen by the Spanish missionaries after the founding of Mission San Juan Capistrano, located to the southeast at the confluence of San Juan and Trabuco Creeks.

One of the first settlers in the Santiago Creek watershed was Jose Pablo Grijalva, a former Spanish soldier, who arrived in 1784. He and his son-in-law, José Antonio Yorba, began grazing cattle in Santiago Creek Canyon in the 1790s. He built an adobe house beside Santiago Creek in 1796. Later settlers included the Peraltas and Sepúlvedas.

Ranchos

Three adjoining ranchos were granted within the creek's drainage. The Spanish era Rancho Santiago de Santa Ana (1810), extending from the Santa Ana River to the Santa Ana Mountains, was 25-mile (40 km)-long, 2.5-to-6.5-mile (4.0 to 10.5 km). The later Mexican era land grants were Rancho San Joaquin (1837) and Rancho Lomas de Santiago (1846). Portions of all later became part of the Irvine Ranch.

A well-known massacre of Native Americans occurred in 1831, in present-day Black Star Canyon, which was called Cañada de los Indios (Indian Canyon) in Spanish. The retaliation was one in a series against local Tongva (Gabrielino) Native Americans taking horses from the Mexican ranchos. A party of American fur trappers set out to retrieve stolen horses. They followed hoofprints into Cañada de los Indios, came upon a Tongva village, massacred the native residents, and took the remaining horses. Though some managed to escape, many Indians were killed in the massacre. The village's site is designated as California Historical Landmark #217.

=== American era ===
Mining

In 1877, two prospectors, Hank Smith and William Curry, discovered silver in present-day Silverado Canyon. Several mines immediately sprang up in the area, the largest of which was known as the Blue Light Mine. During this period, the town of Silverado rose at the confluence of Silverado Creek and Santiago Creek and the boom continued for over three years. Although the height of the mining was in the three or four years following the discovery of silver, smaller-scale mining continued for decades after the initial boom had ended. The last commercial operations at the Blue Light Mine ceased in the 1940s. The mine has continued to issue small amounts of toxic tailings, including arsenic, cadmium, lead, and mercury, remediation for which the Trabuco Ranger District of the Cleveland National Forest began toxic cleanup in 2008.

Modjeska House

In 1883 Polish actress Helena Modjeska purchased the Pleasant family's homestead ranch in Santiago Canyon near the mouth of Harding Creek, the Santiago's first large tributary. She commissioned the renowned New York architect Stanford White to design a country manor house, expanding the Pleasant's house into the landmark Modjeska House in the Arden gardens, within present-day Modjeska Canyon. She lived on the Arden estate, between her European and American theatre season tours, until 1906, and died in 1909. Modjeska Peak, rising 5,496 feet (1,675 m) above Santiago Creek's headwaters, was named in her honor.

=== Water supply infrastructure ===
Santiago Dam

By the 1920s, the Orange/Anaheim/Villa Park area was a prospering agricultural region that depended on water from the Santa Ana River and Santiago Creek. Santiago Creek would unleash seasonal floods in the winter and then while becoming a trickle or completely dry in the summer, making irrigation difficult. The Serrano Irrigation District was formed in 1928, and partnered with the Irvine Company and the Carpenter Irrigation District of El Modena, for the construction of Santiago Dam, impounding Lake Irvine. Construction work begun in 1929 and the dam was completed in 1931. The agricultural areas in the creek's lower watershed were replaced by residential and commercial development in the Post-WWII era, but the city of Villa Park and some of the city of Orange still receive their water from Irvine Lake.

Villa Park Dam

The Villa Park Dam, forming the Villa Park Reservoir further downstream on Santiago Creek, was completed in 1963 also by the Serrano Irrigation District, which by that time, had changed its name to the Serrano Water District. The lower course of Santiago Creek ended up being channelized in the mid-20th century after the passage of the Orange County Flood Control Act of 1927. The dam is now owned by the Orange County Flood Control Division.

== Biology ==
Historically, Santiago Creek supported a rich riparian corridor, connecting the Western Santa Ana Mountains to the greater Santa Ana River corridor. The Santa Ana Mountains supported large amounts of mammals, such as mountain lions, bobcats, coyotes, and foxes, as well as a larger mammals like the California grizzly bear, now extinct, which were abundant in the Canyons. In modern times, the upper Santiago Creek remains much in its natural state, while the lower creek is listed as highly disturbed and no longer supports much native vegetation and wildlife.

Santiago Creek and its tributaries once sustained a large population of Steelhead Trout, but with the construction of Villa Park and Santiago Creek Dams, their anadromous spawning runs from the sea have been destroyed. Historically, at least two tributaries to Santiago Creek, Silverado and Harding Canyons, also supported Resident Rainbow Trout and Santa Ana speckled dace. It was assumed that both creeks only held stocked trout. However in 2003, 13 specimens of rainbow trout, were fin-sampled from Harding Canyon and genetic analysis showed them to be of native and not hatchery stocks. Silverado Creek lost its stocked trout after restoration efforts aimed at removing rock dams destroyed the habitat that the stocked trout needed. Harding Canyon held Rainbow Trout and Speckled Dace as recently as 2007, when the Santiago Fire and subsequent debris flows buried the habitat in over 3 feet of mud. Presently, the watershed only supports introduced fish in, and downstream of, Irvine Lake.

== Recreation ==
Recreation along Santiago Creek, in its watershed, and at its reservoirs includes:

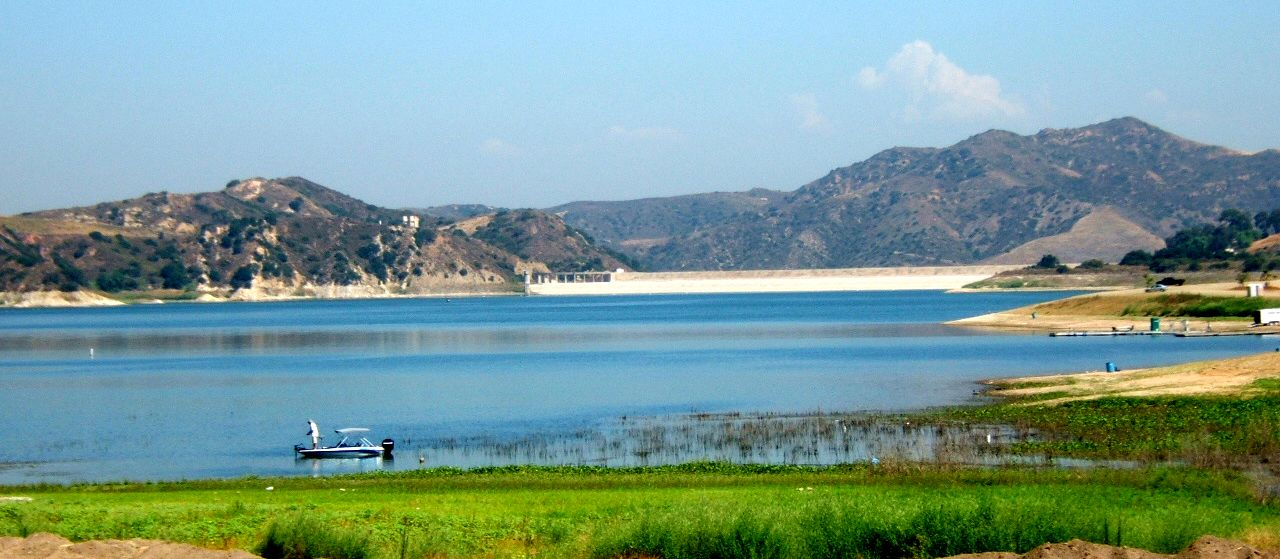
Lake Irvine looking northwest towards the dam

Lake Irvine

Lake Irvine was opened for fishing in 1941. A fishing license is not required to catch fish at the 700-acre (2.8 km^{2}) reservoir. The lake was stocked with fish in the 1930s beginning with largemouth bass, catfish, and panfish. The lake is still stocked weekly with fish.

Irvine Regional Park

Irvine Regional Park, created in 1897, now occupies much of the lowermost Santiago Creek Canyon, between Santiago Creek Dam and Villa Park Reservoir. The park was created officially on October 5 of that year as "Orange County Park", and originally it consisted of 160 acres (0.65 km^{2}) of woodland along the riparian course of Santiago Creek. At first, Santiago Creek flowed freely through the park, but with the completion of Santiago Dam in 1931, that was no longer possible. A boating pond constructed in 1913 then had to be filled with water piped in from Lake Irvine. The park was expanded to its current size of 477 acres (1.93 km^{2}) in 1971, and has hiking, fishing, boating, and a small zoo.

Cleveland National Forest

The upper Santiago Creek watershed lies within the Trabuco Ranger District of the Cleveland National Forest. The Cleveland National Forest was created in 1908, and expanded to 424,000 acres (1,720 km^{2}) by 1925. Several hiking trails run up the steep canyons in the upper Santiago Creek watershed, leading up tributaries such as Black Star Canyon and Silverado Canyon. The Joplin Trail leads up the canyon above the town of Modjeska to the summit of Modjeska Peak.

Other recreational areas

Other parks, nature reserves, recreational areas, and historic sites within the Santiago Creek area include:

- Santiago Oaks Regional Park — City of Orange.
- Barham Ranch — 509-acre addition to Santiago Oaks Regional Park; Villa Park and City of Orange.
- Tucker Wildlife Sanctuary — Modjeska Canyon.
- 'Arden'—Helena Modjeska estate — Modjeska Canyon.
- Irvine Ranch Open Space — operated by OC Parks, programs by Irvine Ranch Conservancy.
- Irvine Ranch Land Reserve — The Nature Conservancy.
- El Modena Open Space — City of Orange.
- El Modena High School Nature Center, Southern California Heritage Garden
- Black Star Canyon, Limestone Canyon, Baker Canyon, Fremont Canyon, and Irvine Mesa.
- Hidden Ranch — Upper Black Star Canyon; The Wildlands Conservancy
- Santa Ana River Trail
- Yorba Regional Park — Anaheim.
- Grijalva Park at Santiago Creek — City of Orange.
- Wo Hart Memorial Park — City of Orange.
- Santiago Park Nature Reserve — Santa Ana. Santiago Park Nature Reserve

== Crossings ==
From mouth to source:

- North Bristol Street
- [Pedestrian Bridge]
- North Flower Street
- I-5 - Santa Ana Freeway
- North Broadway
- Main Street
- [Pedestrian Bridge]
- Santiago Street [Pedestrian Bridge]
- Railroad
- Eastbound California 22 exit to Glassell Street and Grand Avenue
- SR 22 - Garden Grove Freeway
- Entrance to westbound California 22 from Glassell Street and Grand Avenue
- [Pedestrian Bridge]
- Glassell Street
- South Cambridge Street
- East Rock Creek Drive
- South Tustin Street
- SR 55 - Costa Mesa Freeway
- CR S25 - East Chapman Avenue
- East Collins Avenue
- CR S18 - Villa Park Road
- Cannon Street
- SR 241 Toll - Eastern Transportation Corridor (toll road)
- CR S18 - Santiago Canyon Road (two crossings)

== Bibliography ==
- Hoover, Mildred Brooke; Kyle, Douglas E. (1990). Historic spots in California. Stanford University Press. ISBN 0-8047-1734-6.
