= Black Canyon =

Black Canyon may refer to:

- Black Canyon of the Colorado, a canyon on the Colorado River
- Black Canyon City, Arizona, a census-designated place in Yavapai County, Arizona, United States
- Black Canyon of the Gunnison National Park, a United States National Park located in western Colorado
- Black Canyon of the Yellowstone, a canyon on the Yellowstone River in Yellowstone National Park
- Black Canyon Freeway, the portion of Interstate 17 in Phoenix, Arizona
- Black Canyon (Fraser Canyon) or Big Canyon, a stretch of the Fraser Canyon near Boston Bar, British Columbia
- Black Canyon (Thompson River), a stretch of the Thompson River near Ashcroft, British Columbia
- Black Star Canyon, a remote mountain canyon in the Santa Ana Mountains
