= Villa Park Dam =

Dam in Orange County, California, United States of America

Coordinates: 33°48′54″N 117°45′54″W

Villa Park Dam is an embankment dam on Santiago Creek in Orange County, California in the United States. Along with the upstream Santiago Dam, the dam serves primarily for flood control for the cities of Villa Park, Orange, Tustin and Santa Ana and also regulates the inflow of Santiago Creek into the Santa Ana River. Construction was completed in 1963 (63 years ago), and the dam is owned by the County of Orange.

Standing 118 feet (36 m) high, the dam forms a reservoir with a maximum capacity of 15,600 acre-feet (19,200,000 m^{3}), controlling runoff from a catchment area of 83.9 square miles (217 km^{2}). Due to flood control requirements, the reservoir is typically at a very low level or empty during the dry season.

== See also ==
- List of dams and reservoirs in California
