= Santiago Dam =

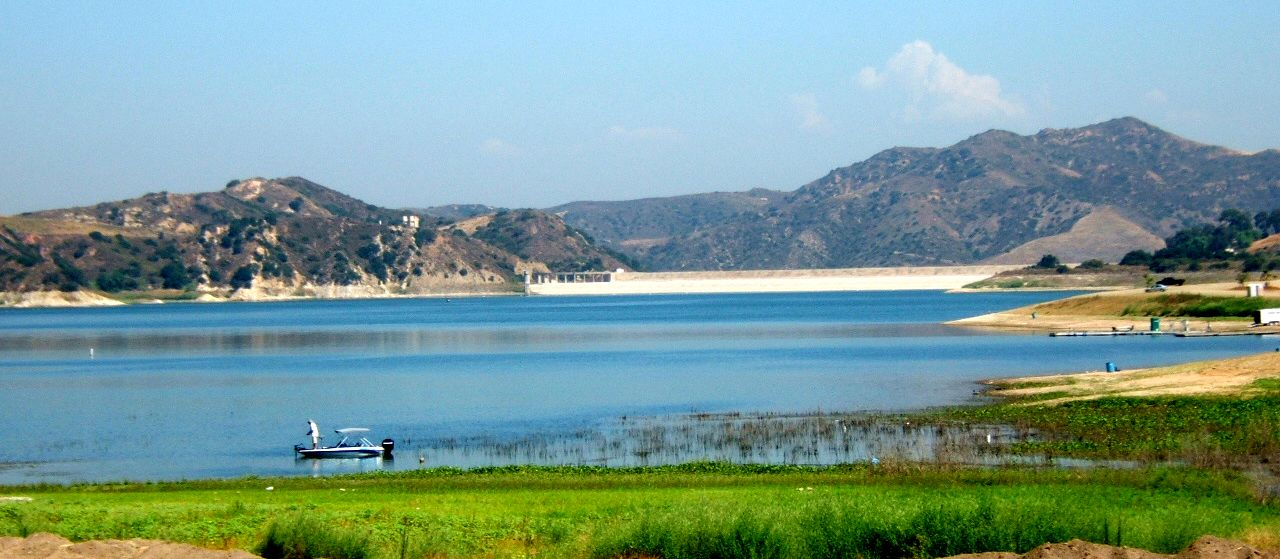
- Santiago Dam, viewed from the eastern end of the lake

- Location of Santiago Dam in California
- Country: United States
- Location: Orange County, California
- Coordinates: 33°47′10″N 117°43′31″W
- Construction began: 1929 (Irvine Company, Serrano Irrigation District)
- Opening date: 1931; 95 years ago
- Owner: Serrano Water District/Irvine Ranch Water District

Dam and spillways
- Type of dam: Roller-compacted earth and rock fill
- Impounds: Santiago Creek
- Height: 136 ft (41 m)
- Length: 1,425 ft (434 m)
- Width (crest): 29 ft (8.8 m)
- Width (base): 760 ft (230 m)
- Dam volume: 790,000 yd^{3} (600,000 m^{3})
- Spillway type: Uncontrolled concrete overflow
- Spillway capacity: 31,700 cu ft/s (900 m^{3}/s)

Reservoir
- Creates: Irvine Lake
- Total capacity: 38,800 acre⋅ft (47,900,000 m^{3}) (max); 25,000 acre⋅ft (31,000,000 m^{3}) (conservation)
- Catchment area: 64 sq mi (170 km^{2})
- Surface area: 700 acres (280 ha)

Power Station
- Hydraulic head: 120 ft (37 m)
- Installed capacity: None

Santiago Dam (also known as Santiago Creek Dam) is an earth/rockfill dam across Santiago Creek in Orange County, in the U.S. state of California, forming Irvine Lake. The 136-foot (41 m) earth dam and its reservoir serve for flood control and recreational purposes. It lies upstream (southeast) from the city of Orange and north of Irvine. Irvine Lake is the largest body of fresh water entirely in Orange County.

== History ==
Construction on the dam started in 1929 with a joint venture by the Irvine Company and Serrano Irrigation District. After the site was graded, the dam was built using dirt and rock excavated from the sides of the canyon and from the streambed both above and below the dam site. The structure was completed in 1931 at a cost of $1 million, and its reservoir, Irvine Lake, filled by 1933. In the late 1930s, the lake was stocked with fish, and was opened to the public for recreational use in 1941.

The dam was built to serve the purpose of flood control, irrigation and municipal water use. With heavy suburban sprawl downstream encroaching since the 1960s, agriculture along lower Santiago Creek has practically ceased. It is currently owned by the Irvine Ranch Water District and the Serrano Water District (the former Serrano Irrigation District). Today the dam marks the usual ending point of surface flow in Santiago Creek, as all the discharge is retained in the reservoir and downstream flow is limited to seepage and stormwater.

== Statistics ==
The Santiago Dam is a roller compacted earth and rockfill structure 136 feet (41 m) high and 1,425 feet (434 m) long. It is roughly 760 feet (230 m) wide at the base and contains some 790,000 cubic yards (600,000 m^{3}) of material. The dam's spillway is a concrete overflow structure to the left side, equipped with nine openings each 15 feet (4.6 m) wide and 28 feet (8.5 m) high, able to pass a flow exceeding 30,000 cubic feet per second (850 m^{3}/s). This spillway has only been used a few times, such as the floods of 1938, 1969, 1983, 1998, 2005 and 2011. The dam crest is 804 feet (245 m) above sea level.

Irvine Lake is the reservoir formed behind the dam, and has a normal storage of 25,000 acre-feet (31,000,000 m^{3}) at 791 feet (241 m) elevation. Maximum storage is 28,000 acre-feet (35,000,000 m^{3}) in the event of a flood. This reservoir is not only the largest man-made lake in Orange County, but is also the largest body of fresh water entirely in the county. The lake covers about 700 acres (280 ha) and is stocked with several species of fish. A fishing license is not required.

The dam and reservoir receive water from a catchment area totaling 64 square miles (170 km^{2}), controlling water from about two-thirds of the Santiago Creek watershed. Santiago Dam is designed to contain up to a 50-year flood and withstand a 500-year flood of over 30,000 cubic feet per second (850 m^{3}/s). Aside from Santiago Creek, Limestone Wash and various unnamed streams flow into the reservoir. Upstream tributaries of Santiago Creek include Silverado and Modjeska Creeks. The dam operates in conjunction with the downstream Villa Park Dam, which can store up to 15,600 acre-feet (19,200,000 m^{3}). Villa Park is designed to stay dry during normal weather conditions and hold back most flood releases from the Santiago Dam.

== See also ==
- List of dams and reservoirs in California
