= Black Star Canyon =

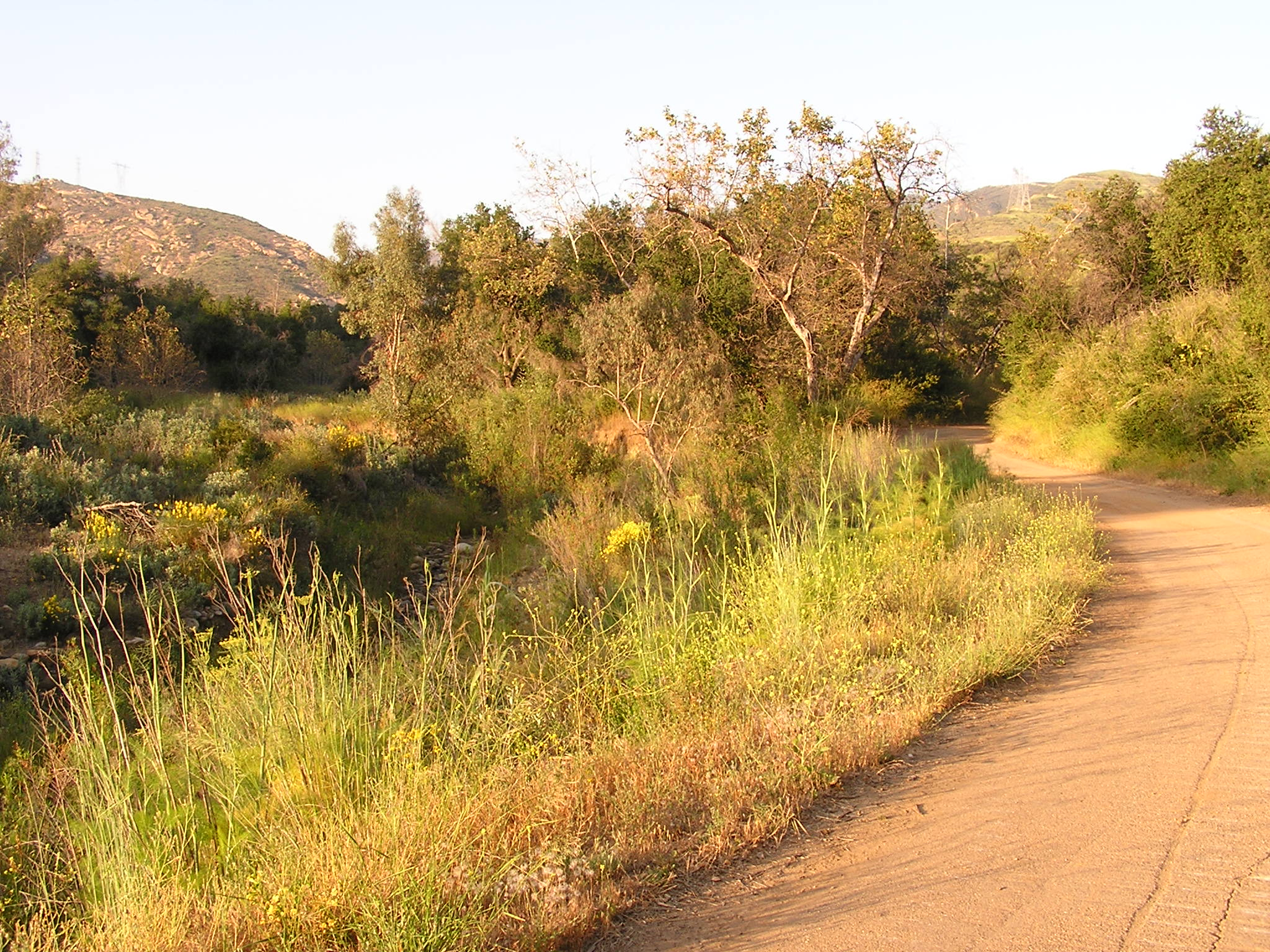
- Black Star Canyon Road, at the mouth of the canyon

- Location within California
- 33.766091°N 117.679152°W
- Location: Santa Ana Mountains, Orange County, California

California Historical Landmark
- Official name: Black Star Canyon Indian Village Site
- Reference no.: 217

Black Star Canyon is a remote mountain canyon in the Santa Ana Mountains, located in eastern Orange County, California. It is a watershed of the Santa Ana River. Black Star Canyon is a popular destination for mountain bikers as well as hikers due to its wild scenery. The California Historical Landmark associated with the canyon refers to the village of Puhú.

== History ==
=== Tongva-Gabrieliño ===
Black Star Canyon is perhaps best known to historians as an important archaeological site as much information concerning the daily lives of the Tongva-Gabrieliño people has been uncovered through studies of artifacts found in the canyon. It is known that many of the native Tongva people fled to the mountains in the summer, searching not only for relief from the heat, but also for acorns, their main source of food, which were easy to find among the canyon's many mature oak trees. It is very likely that the settlement – located in the upper part of the canyon – was inhabited for only part of the year. The site of the settlement is now California Historical Landmark number 217. Indian settlements were very sporadic, as the grizzly bear population of the Santa Anas was comparatively high for such a small mountain range.

The village of Puhú was a major residential area for the Tongva, Acjachemen, Payómkawichum, and Serrano in the area and the site of a massacre in 1831. According to a story recounted by early settler J. E. "Judge" Pleasants, a battle between American fur trappers, led by William Wolfskill, and a group of Tongva Indians occurred as follows:

The story of the battle, the bloodiest in the history of the Santa Ana Mountains, was told seventy years ago by William Wolfskill to J. E. Pleasants, and was repeated to us by Mr. Pleasants. The Indians were very fond of horseflesh. Ranchos were lacking in means of defense in the days when the missions were breaking up and Indians from the mountains and desert used to have no trouble in stealing herds of horses from the Spaniards. A party of trappers came across from New Mexico in 1831. Their long rifles and evident daring offered to the troubled dons a solution to their horse-stealing difficulties. Americans were not any too welcome in the Mexican pueblo of Los Angeles, and it was with a desire to please the Spaniards [Mexicans] in this foreign land a long way from the United States that the American trappers agreed to run down the Indian horsethieves.

The trail of the stolen band of horses was followed across the Santa Ana River, eastward through what is now Villa Park and up the Santiago Canyon to the mouth of Canyon de los Indios... Here, the trail turned into mountain fastnesses, into the unknown mountains, covered heavily with brush. With every turn a favorable spot for ambush, the frontiersmen made their way carefully. The trail took the men up a steep mountainside, and, after two or three hours of climbing there was laid out before them a little valley with grassy slopes and hillsides [today called Hidden Ranch], upon which horses were quietly grazing. Smoke was coming from fires in the age-old campground of the Indians at the lower end of the valley. The Indians were feasting on juicy horseflesh. Perhaps it was the crack of a long rifle, the staggering of a mortally wounded Indian that gave the natives their first warning of the presence of an enemy. Among the oaks and boulders an unequal battle was fought. There were no better marksmen on earth than these trappers. They had killed buffalo. They had fought the Comanche and Apache. They were a hardy, fearless lot, else they would not have made their way across the hundreds of miles of unknown mountain and desert that laid between New Mexico and California. The Indians were armed with a few old Spanish blunderbuss muskets and with bows and arrows.

The battle was soon over. Leaving their dead behind them, the Indians who escaped the bullets of the trappers scrambled down the side of the gorge and disappeared in the oaks and brush. Of those who had begun the fight, but a few got away. The stolen horses were quickly rounded up. Some of them were animals stolen months before. The herd was driven down the trail to the Santiago and a day or two later, the horses were delivered to their owners. In the battle, not one of the frontiersmen was wounded.

This event has more recently been identified as a communal massacre. More recent in-depth research has revealed flaws in this memorialization of the villagers both in relation to the size of the village and the activities of the villagers. The claim that villagers were consuming horse flesh has been identified as a common trope promoted by Spanish colonial authorities, particularly in the Alta California region. Scientific analysis of the village's midden found that no horse or European livestock remains were present.

=== Spanish, Mexican, early American eras ===
Under Spanish, and later Mexican rule, the canyon was called Cañada de los Indios. Much of grassy foothill terrain to the west (across Irvine Lake) was part of the expansive Mexican land grant of "Rancho Lomas de Santiago (Ranch of Saint James' Hills)". The rancho later fell into the hands of the pioneer and horticulturalist William Wolfskill, and finally James Irvine, before becoming part of the Cleveland National Forest in the late 1880s.

After discovering coal deposits in the canyon, August Witte founded the Black Star Coal Mining Company in 1879, which gave the canyon its current name. The coal was originally dug from a shallow pit on the hill just east of the canyon mouth, used almost exclusively by the canyon's few residents. While the operation lasted, six to ten tons of medium- to low-grade coal were extracted each day from the mine's 900 feet of tunnel. From there, mule teams hauled the cargo to Anaheim or Los Angeles by wagon. However, a survey was run of the mine in the late 1870s, previously thought to be operating on government land, and it was found that the land actually belonged to the Irvine Ranch. Promptly losing interest in the mine, James Irvine sold the operation back to its former owners, destroying any possibility of profit.

The Black Star mining operation was later replaced by the Santa Clara Mine, a more successful enterprise that sustained the town of Carbondale (once existed at the mouth of Silverado canyon), before it was taken over by AT&SF Railroad.

The armed conflict in 1831 between trappers led by William Wolfskill and Native Americans has led to many urban legends stating the mine is haunted to this day.

The mine has operated on and off until it closed for good in the early 20th century.

== Park ==
Traces of the Black Star mining operation can still be found, including rusted mining equipment, abandoned shafts, and piles of low-grade coal scattered about the floor of the canyon (similar to those found in Fremont Canyon to the north). In the early 1920s, the United States Forest Service built a narrow but well-graded road up Black Star Canyon and down the eastern slope of the mountains to Corona, thus opening the ranchlands of the upper canyon to hikers. Today, public access to the canyon's upper reaches in the Cleveland National Forest is currently allowed via a county easement through the lower section of the canyon, although Orange County officials do not maintain the road.

The lower part of the canyon, along both sides of Black Star Canyon Road from Santiago Canyon Road, is OC Parks property. The area is open for scheduled programs only, managed by Irvine Ranch Conservancy. This portion of the canyon is part of a National Natural Landmark, known as the Irvine Ranch Natural Landmarks. A listing of programs is available on the Landmarks' website.

The beginning of the canyon is marked with signs which declare the road as private, which is half-true since the lower part of the road is privately maintained, although the county and, therefore the forest service, have an easement of public right-of-passage on the road, and have had that right for many decades.

== Stories and legends ==
=== Hidden Ranch murder ===
The canyon would find itself the scene of a second murder. In 1899, long after the canyon had been settled by both Anglo-American and Mexican homesteaders, a shooting occurred at Hidden Ranch that would forever change Orange County's early political scene.

Perhaps no death by violence touched the public career of any man in the county so much as did the killing of James Gregg on June 9, 1899, affect the career of its superior court judge, the late J. W. Ballard. The Hidden Ranch at that time was in the hands of Henry Hungerford of Norwalk and George M. Howard of Anaheim. At the ranch with them was Hungerford’s brother, Thomas L. Hungerford. On the evening of June 8, James M. Gregg of Centralia and his brother-in-law, Decatur Harris, and a 13-year-old boy, Clinton Hunt, arrived for the purpose of driving out some stock that Gregg owned. Gregg and Henry Hungerford quarreled. It seems that Howard owed Gregg $10 on a horse trade, and Gregg insisted that Hungerford and Howard accept $7.50 in settlement of their pasturage bill of $17.50.

That night, Gregg, Harris and the boy slept on the ground in front of the house. When Gregg was rolling up his blankets the next morning, Henry Hungerford came out and the dispute resumed. It ended in shooting. The Hungerfords, each armed with a shotgun, and Gregg, with a revolver, fought it out. When the shooting ceased, Gregg was on the ground with charges of birdshot and buckshot through him. The Hungerfords hitched up a horse and drove down Black Star and on into Santa Ana, where they gave themselves up to Sheriff Theo Lacy. In the meantime, Gregg was laid in a spring wagon by Harris and the boy and was being taken to a doctor when, near the Irvine Park in Santiago canyon, the wagon was met by Sheriff Lacy and District Attorney R. Y. Williams. A doctor was found at El Modena and it was at a house in El Modena that Gregg died. The trial before Judge Ballard resulted in the conviction of Henry Hungerford.

In those days killings were infrequent and a trial of this kind created an interest that was widespread and intense. Public sentiment was against the defendants. Following conviction, a new trial was sought, and unexpectedly Judge Ballard granted the motion on the ground that not enough evidence had been produced to warrant the verdict. Having presented all the evidence available there was nothing for the district attorney to do but ask for the dismissal of the case. Soon afterward, Judge Ballard came up for re-election, with Z. B. West as his opponent. Judge Ballard’s decision in the Hungerford case was the outstanding issue of the campaign, which was vigorous and which resulted in the defeat of Judge Ballard. Many people claim to see the ghosts of these incidents, however, due to the culture of the canyon, many of these ghost stories are written off as hallucinations.
