= Silverado Canyon =

Gorge in California, USA

Coordinates: 33°44′52″N 117°35′00″W

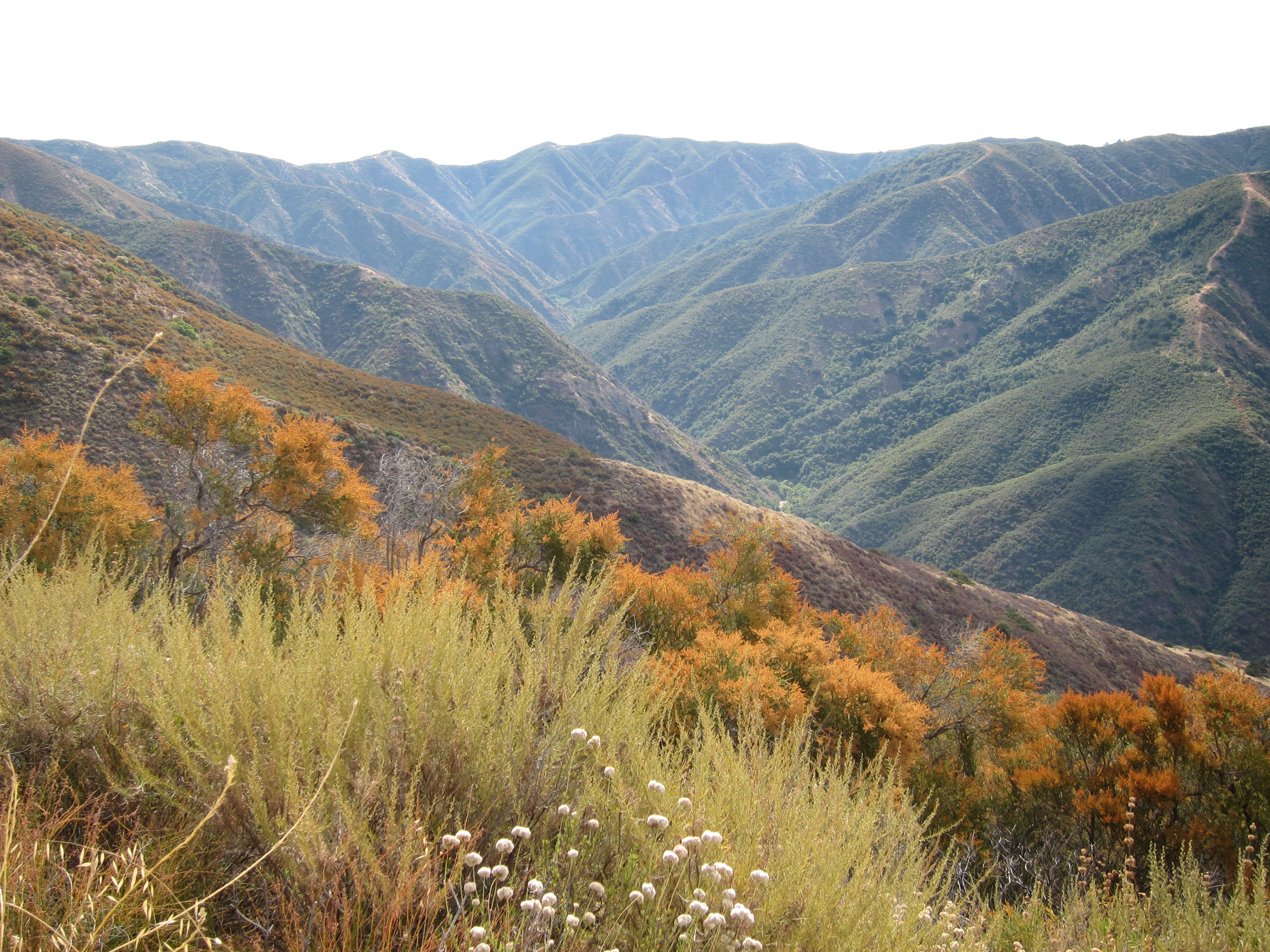
Silverado Canyon looking east from the Silverado Motorway trail.

Silverado Canyon is a roughly 2,500-foot-deep (760 m) gorge in the Santa Ana Mountains, in the U.S. state of California. The small stream it is associated with, Silverado Creek, rises on the north slope of Modjeska Peak at the elevation of 3,980 feet (1,210 m) and flows north and west, past the town of Silverado to join Santiago Creek at 942 feet (287 m) after a journey of just under 5 miles (8.0 km). The main branch, Ladd Canyon, is just over 3 miles (4.8 km) long. Its stream arises on the east flank of Pleasants Peak at about 3,590 feet (1,090 m) and flows southwest into the main stem at about 1,178 feet (359 m) near Silverado. They are part of the Santa Ana River watershed. A hiking trail/fire road runs the entire length of the canyon.

== Background ==
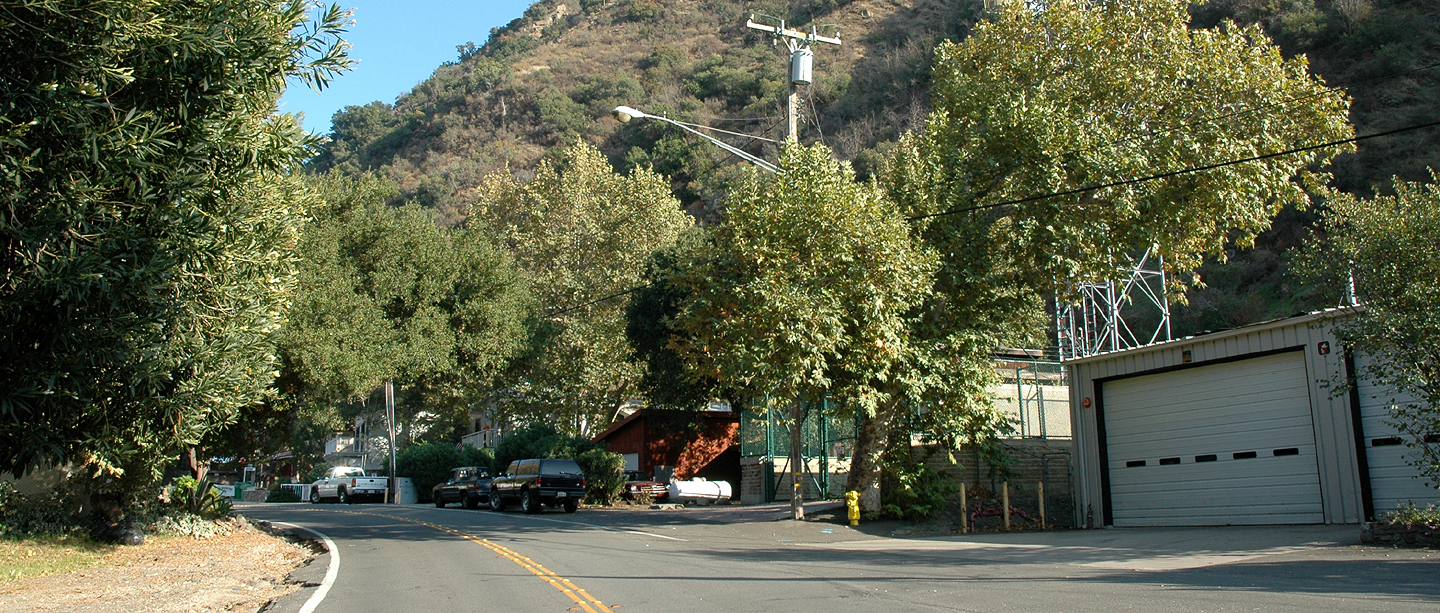
Silverado Canyon

The town of Silverado is situated in the canyon, with most of its buildings between the point where the canyon opens out into a valley and a U.S. Forest Service gate where the valley road enters the Cleveland National Forest. The town is mostly residential; there are, however, also a few stores, mostly in the east side. 5,498-foot (1,676 m) Modjeska Peak, part of Saddleback, rises to the south; 3,947-foot (1,203 m) Bald Peak forms the head of the gorge to the east, and 3,800-foot (1,200 m) Bedford Peak towers to the north.

Silverado Creek runs in the winter and dries up in the summer, reaching its highest flow in winter and early spring, while diminishing to a trickle or drying up for most of the rest of the year. It has been known to dry up at the low-water crossing directly upstream of the Forest Service gate. By the time it reaches the downstream end of Silverado, it is usually dry.

The canyon is so named because silver mines originally operated in the area. Tailings from the Blue Light Mine milling operation on the south side of the canyon can still be seen. In 2002, two people exploring the mine suffocated from bad air. The silver ore in the presence of moisture removes the oxygen from the air.

There is a forest service gate at the end of Silverado. This gate is closed most of the year. Often the gates open or closed status on the forest service website is incorrect. The forest service status it is not updated regularly. This maintained dirt access road is dangerous and there are a significant number of injuries on it every year from vehicle crashes. Hiking this road on foot is not recommended while the gate is open. The maintained dirt access road is steep has sharp rocks that cause flat tires regularly. Do not drive this road without a full size inflated spare tire. The condition of this road varies drastically throughout the year. It can be easily passable after being graded but is usually heavily rutted. Rain damage such as road washouts and fallen trees are why the gate is closed any time it is raining. The gate usually remains closed after rains for several weeks as the road is cleared and repaired by the forest service.
