= Saddleback Valley =

Large valley in Orange County, California

- Valley
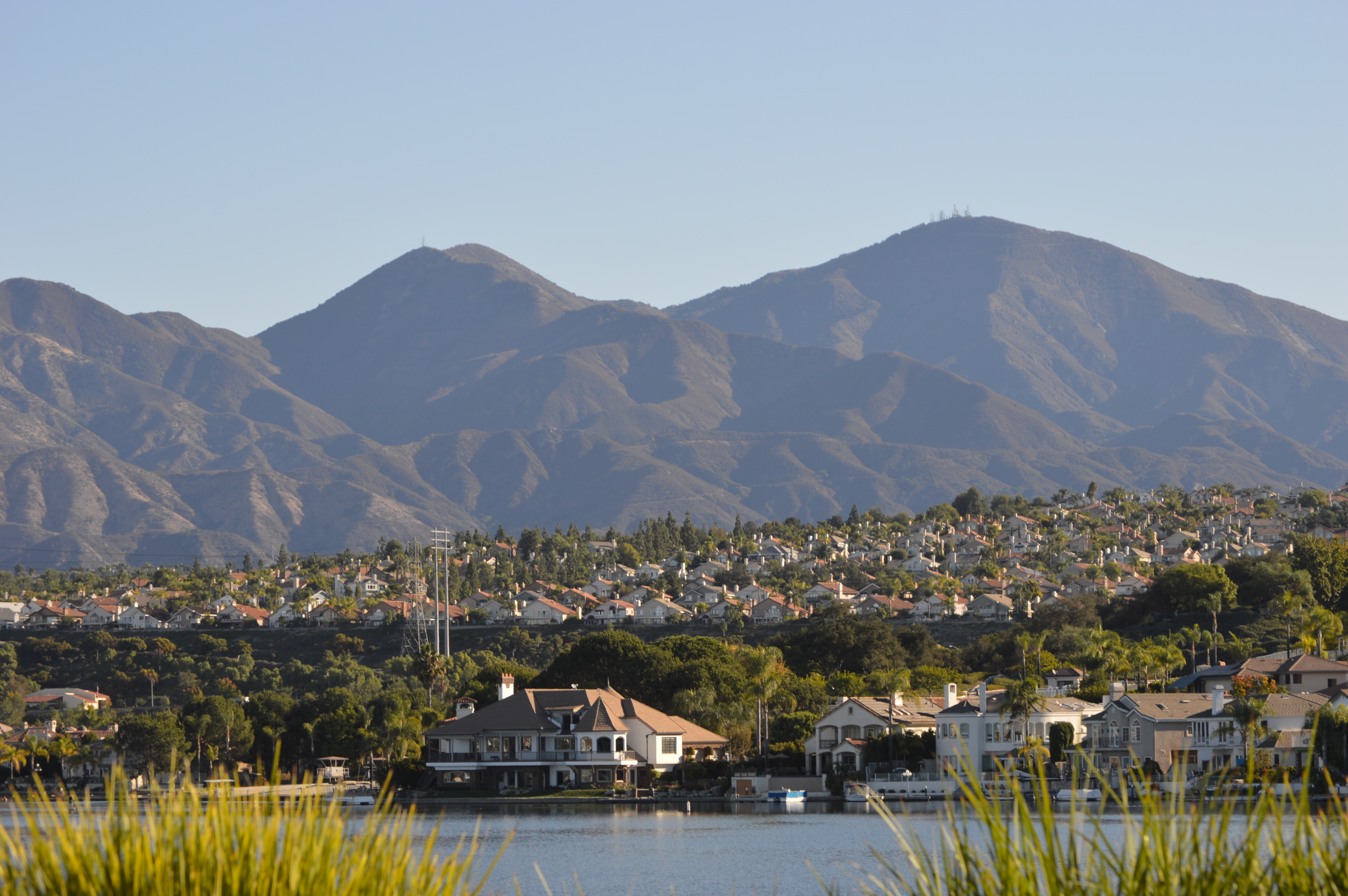
- Saddleback Mountain and its foothills viewed from Lake Mission Viejo, a lake in the valley
- Interactive map of Saddleback Valley
- Coordinates: 33°37′35″N 117°40′52″W
- Location: Orange County, California, United States
- Highest elevation: 5,689 ft (1,734 m) (Santiago Peak)

Saddleback Valley refers to the flat and foothill areas west-southwest of the Saddleback double peak of the Santa Ana Mountains and east-northeast of the hilly Crystal Cove State Park in southern Orange County, California. The region primarily encompasses the cities of Mission Viejo, Lake Forest, and Rancho Santa Margarita, as well as the communities of Coto de Caza and Ladera Ranch. The cities of Aliso Viejo, Laguna Woods, Laguna Hills, and Laguna Niguel, as well as some of Orange County's eastern canyon communities, partially reside within the valley. The southeastern portion of Irvine also encroaches upon the area, but the two are not typically associated with each other.

The cityscape within Saddleback Valley is suburban, a remote reach of the Los Angeles metropolitan area. The area is recently developed and on the outskirts of the Southern California megalopolis, so wildlife sightings are more common. Snakes, coyotes, and mountain lions have long inhabited the area. Mountain lion attacks on people have happened in the outlying wilderness parks of Saddleback Valley, but they are very rare.

== Cultural impact ==
The identity of Saddleback Valley has proven to be of importance throughout the history of major civilizations in the area. Many businesses, schools, places, and other entities in the region have "Saddleback" or "Saddleback Valley" incorporated into their names. Saddleback Church, one of the largest megachurches in the world, is based in Lake Forest. Saddleback College is located in Mission Viejo and bears the name of the region, as well as an illustration of the Saddleback mountains as their logo. Saddleback Valley Unified School District, as its name suggests, serves much of the valley with public elementary, intermediate, and high schools. Several small businesses in the area have also included Saddleback in their names and branding.

== Gallery ==
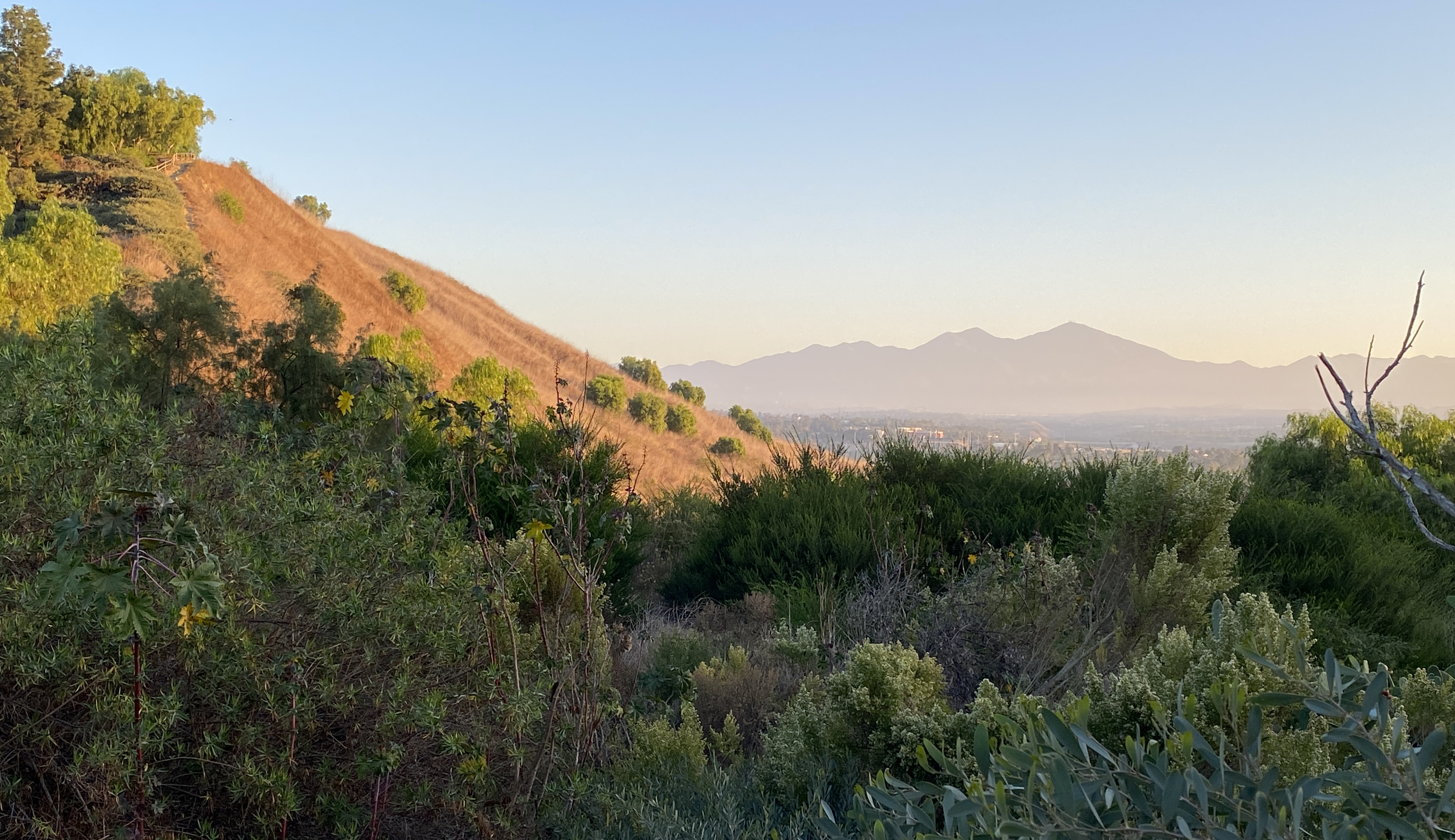
Saddleback Valley viewed from the hills of Laguna Niguel

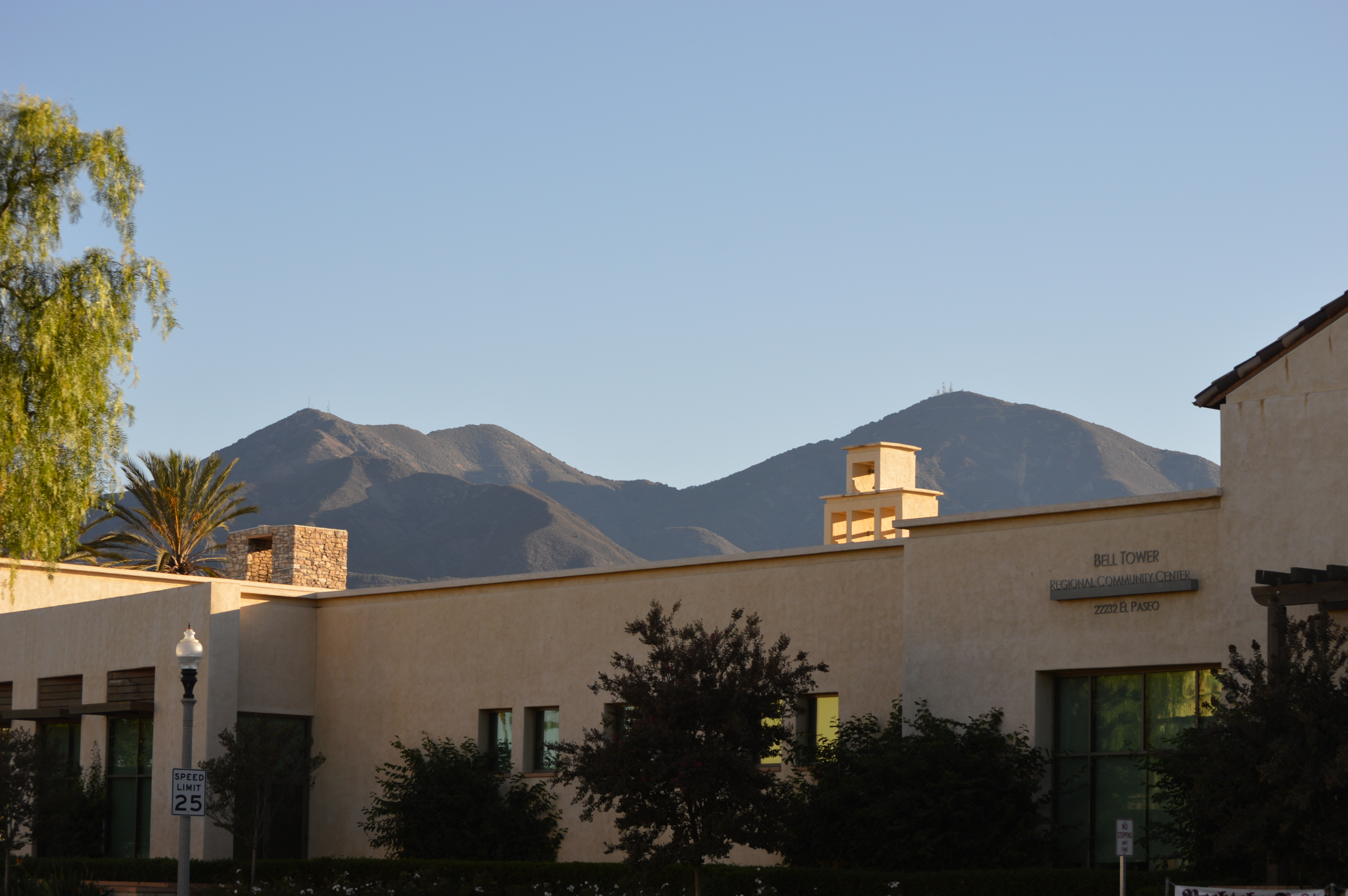
Saddleback Mountain from Rancho Santa Margarita

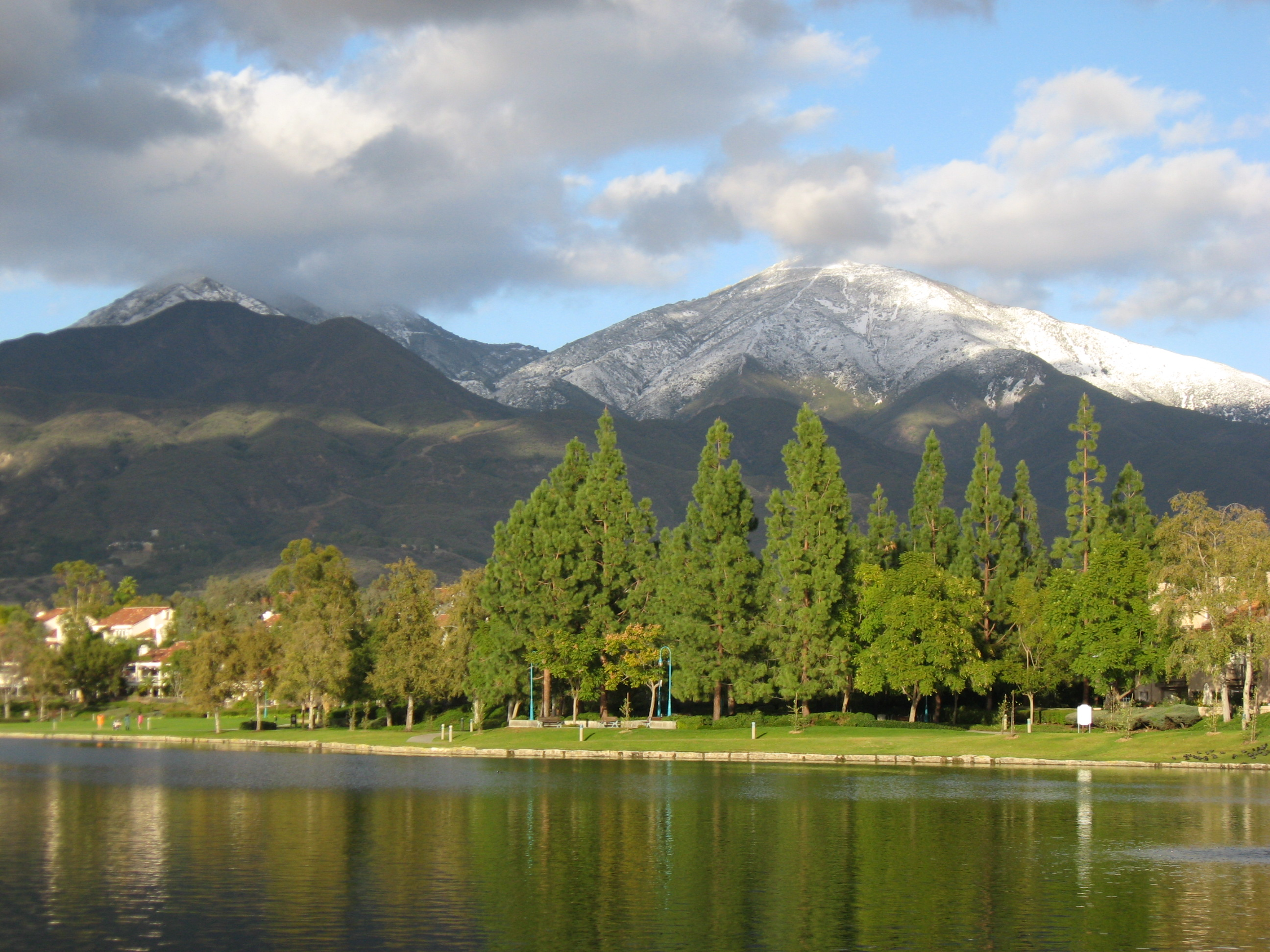
Snow on Saddleback Mountain in 2008 viewed from Rancho Santa Margarita

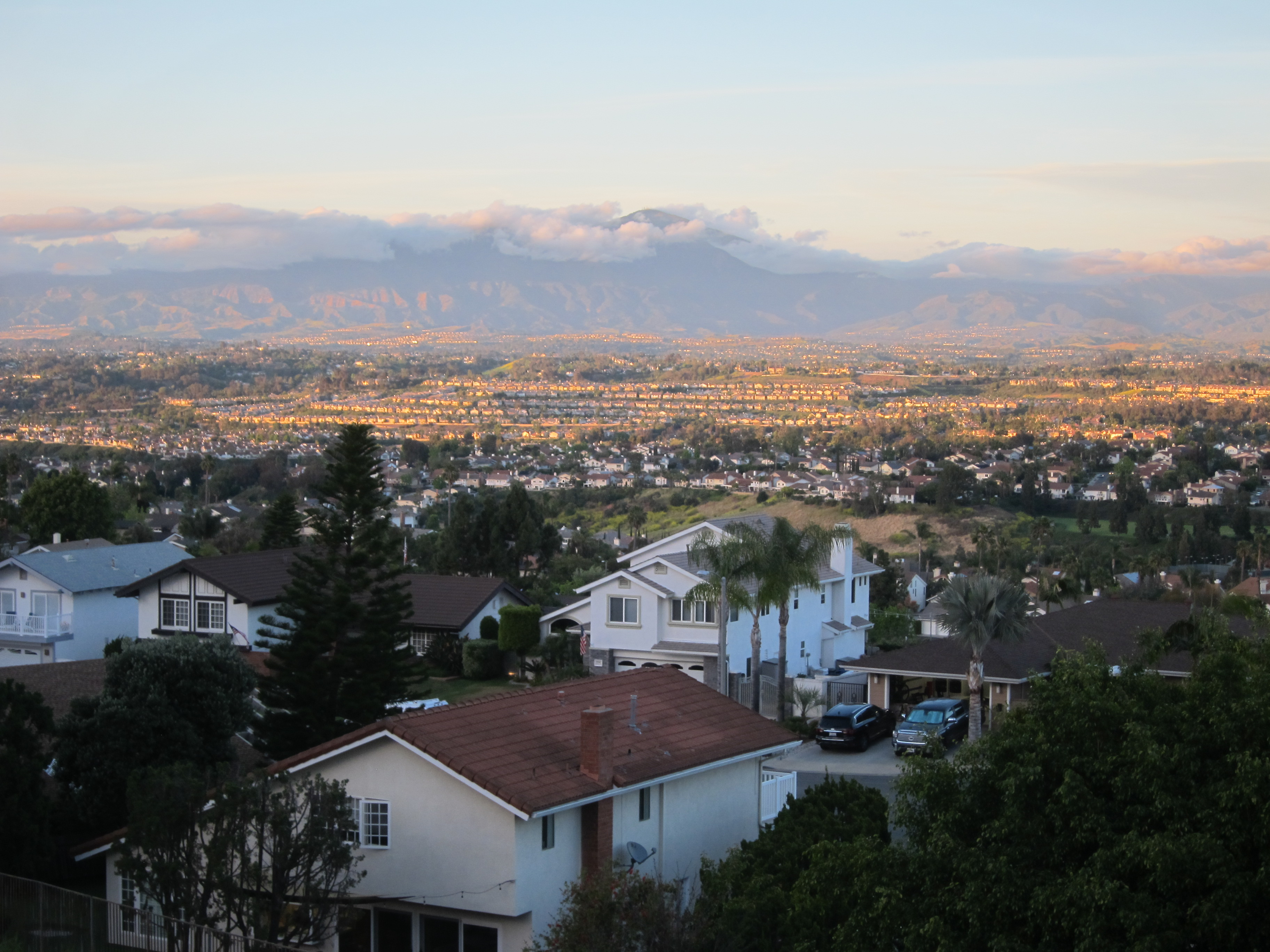
Saddleback Valley as seen from Laguna Niguel
