= Irvine Lake =

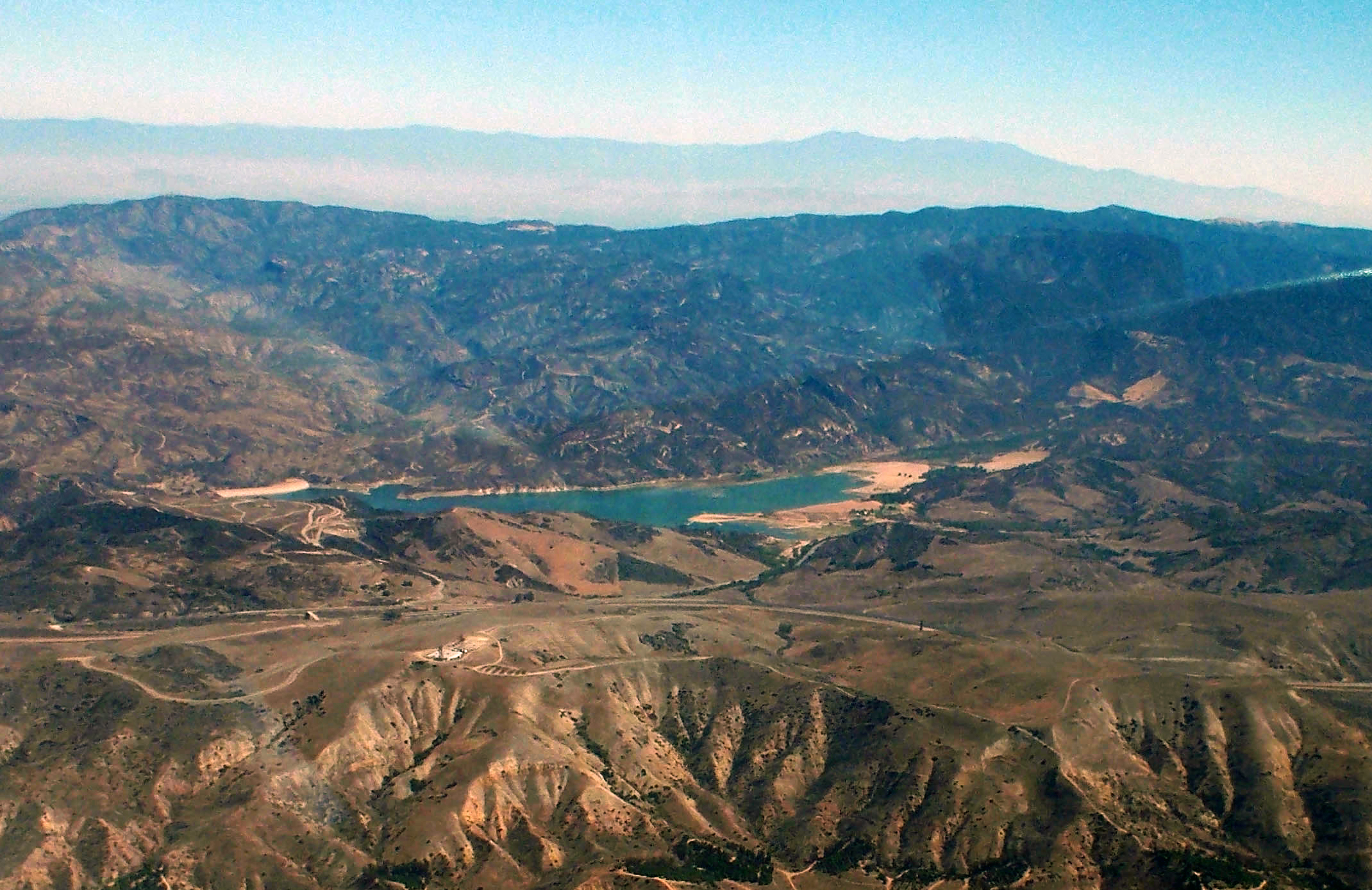

- Location within California Location within the United States
- Location: Orange County, California
- Coordinates: 33°46′37″N 117°43′11″W
- Type: Reservoir
- Basin countries: United States
- Surface area: 700 acres (2.8 km^{2})
- Water volume: 28,000 acre⋅ft (0.035 km^{3})

Irvine Lake is a reservoir in Orange County, California, United States. It is on Santiago Creek, located in Silverado, California, east of the city of Irvine and close to Irvine Regional Park. The reservoir is currently operated by the Serrano Water District and OC Parks.

Access to the lake is via Santiago Canyon Road, the road leading from Orange to Silverado. Cleveland National Forest is on the northeast side of the lake.

== History ==
The lake is formed by Santiago Dam at the lake's north end, which was built between 1929 and 1931, and was originally called the Santiago Reservoir. The dam was built by the Irvine Company and the Serrano Water District (known as Serrano Irrigation District at the time); it is now owned by the Irvine Ranch Water District and operated in conjunction with OC Parks. The lake provides drinking water to Villa Park and some parts of Orange, and provides supplementary irrigation water to neighboring ranches.

Stocked with largemouth bass, catfish, trout, and crappie, the lake fishery opened to the public in 1941. The land around the lake is owned by the Irvine Company, which leases the fishing, boating, and camping concessions to SWD Recreation Inc.

The lake had not been full from 2011 onward due to an extended drought, and its levels had been steadily decreasing for years. In September 2016, it was at 13 percent of capacity. By August 2019, the lake was naturally refilled due to an unusual amount of rain. The amount of area covered in water went from 2,700 acre-feet to 15,715 acre-feet in a one-year span.

In 2016, Irvine Lake was closed to the public due to financial disagreements between the Serrano Water District and the Irvine Company. The Orange County Grand Jury did an investigation and recommended working with OC Parks to mediate the risks in the operations. In August 2019, the lake was successfully reopened to the public for shore fishing and other activities after OC Parks, the Serrano Water District, and the Irvine Company came to a one-year agreement to resume operations.

On January 15, 2025, Serrano Water District transferred its 25% ownership of the Lake and Dam to Irvine Ranch Water District.

== See also ==
- List of lakes in California
