= Serrano Water District =

Special district for groundwater maintenance in Orange County

Agency overview
- Formed: 1876; 150 years ago
- Headquarters: 18021 Lincoln St; Villa Park, California; 33°48′30″N 117°49′03″W
- Employees: 10
- Agency executive: General Manager
- Website: Official website

Footnotes

The Serrano Water District is a California special district that maintains the groundwater of parts of eastern Orange County. The agency serves a 4.7 square mile area that encompasses the entirety of Villa Park and a small portion of Orange. The population served is approximately 6,500.

The agency was created in 1876 as the Serrano Irrigation District, making it one of the oldest standing water districts in Southern California. Serrano Water District helped to create the Santiago Dam and Irvine Lake. Currently, the agency owns their water treatment plant, 50% of Irvine Lake, and 43 miles of pipeline.

In 2019, Serrano Water District successfully negotiated with the county, OC Parks, and Irvine Ranch Water District to reopen Irvine Lake to public recreation.
