= Saddleback (Orange County, California) =

Mountain ridge in the United States

Coordinates: 33°42′55″N 117°32′29″W

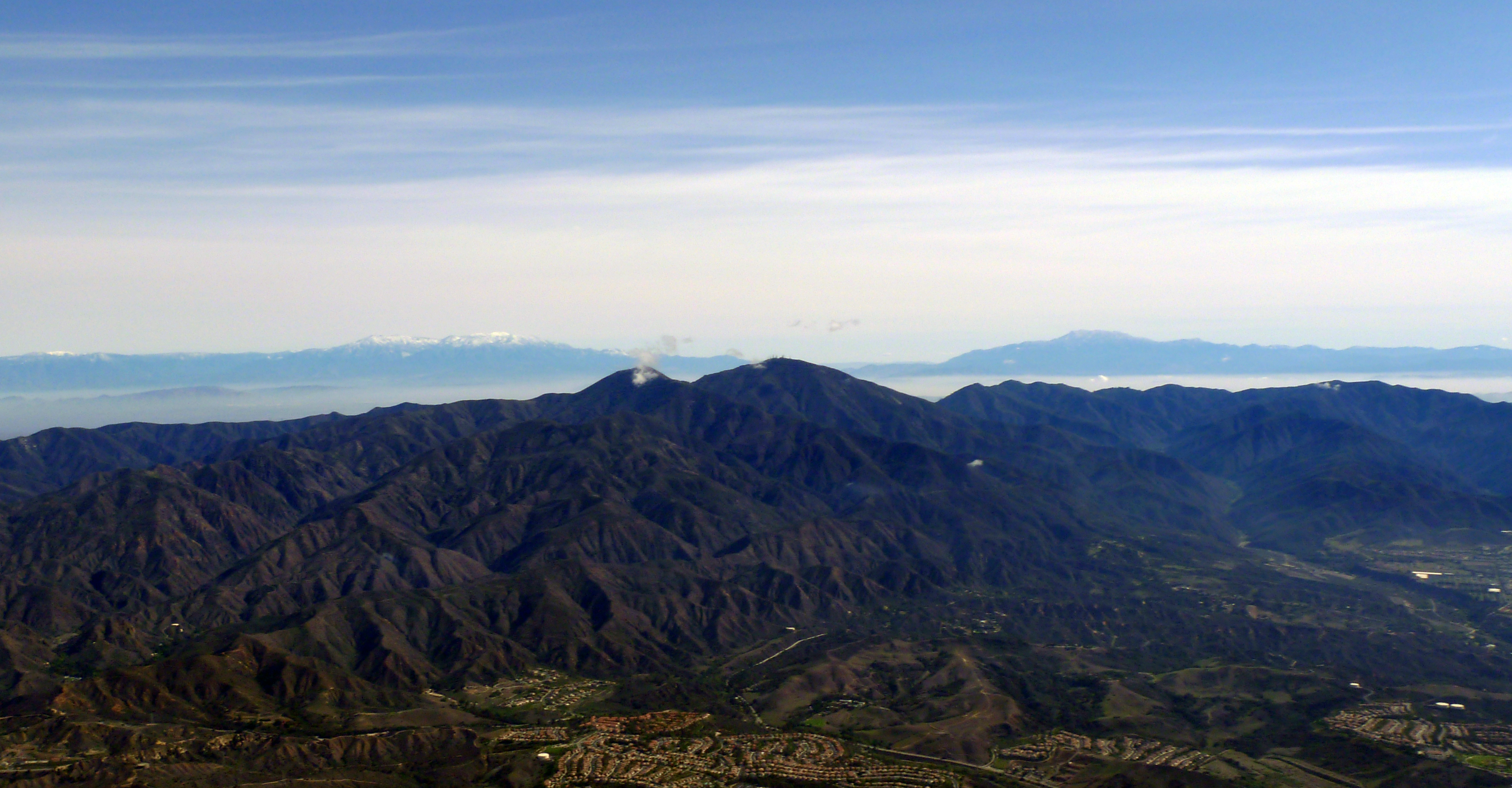
An aerial view of Santiago and Modjeska peaks of Saddleback from the west, looking eastward toward the San Jacinto Mountains and beyond

Saddleback, sometimes called Old Saddleback or Saddleback Mountain, is a natural landmark formed by the two highest peaks of the Santa Ana Mountains in the U.S. state of California, and the gap between them. Resembling a saddle as viewed from the south from most of Orange County, California, as well as the Inland Empire to the north, this landform dominates Orange County’s eastern skyline. On the clearest days, Saddleback is visible from most of the Greater Los Angeles area.

Santiago Peak is the highest peak in the range and the highest point in the county at 5,689 ft (1,734 m). Modjeska Peak is the second highest at 5,496 ft (1,675 m). The two peaks form part of the border between Orange and Riverside counties.

The hilly landscape in south Orange County is known colloquially as Saddleback Valley, and hence many institutions are named after Saddleback, including Saddleback Church, Saddleback College, and the Saddleback Valley Unified School District.

The presence of volcanic rocks in Silverado Canyon, and underlying all the sediments on the modern mountain indicates that Saddleback Mountain in the form of small volcanoes was formed prior to the development of the San Andreas Fault, unlike its present form from said faulting, back when a subduction zone occurred where the Pacific Plate went under California. Though it was only a short island arc off of the coast of ancient California, the mountains various faults start on crystalline basement rock near the riverside border, and occur on younger and younger sedimentary rocks towards the coast, the older crystalline basement rocks being exposed on a flat coastal swamp so long they have weathered to kaolinite clay along various areas. While these does not exist west ward, proving the age of the modern mountain, and the ecosystem it was before hand.
