= Modjeska Peak =

Peak in the Santa Ana mountain range

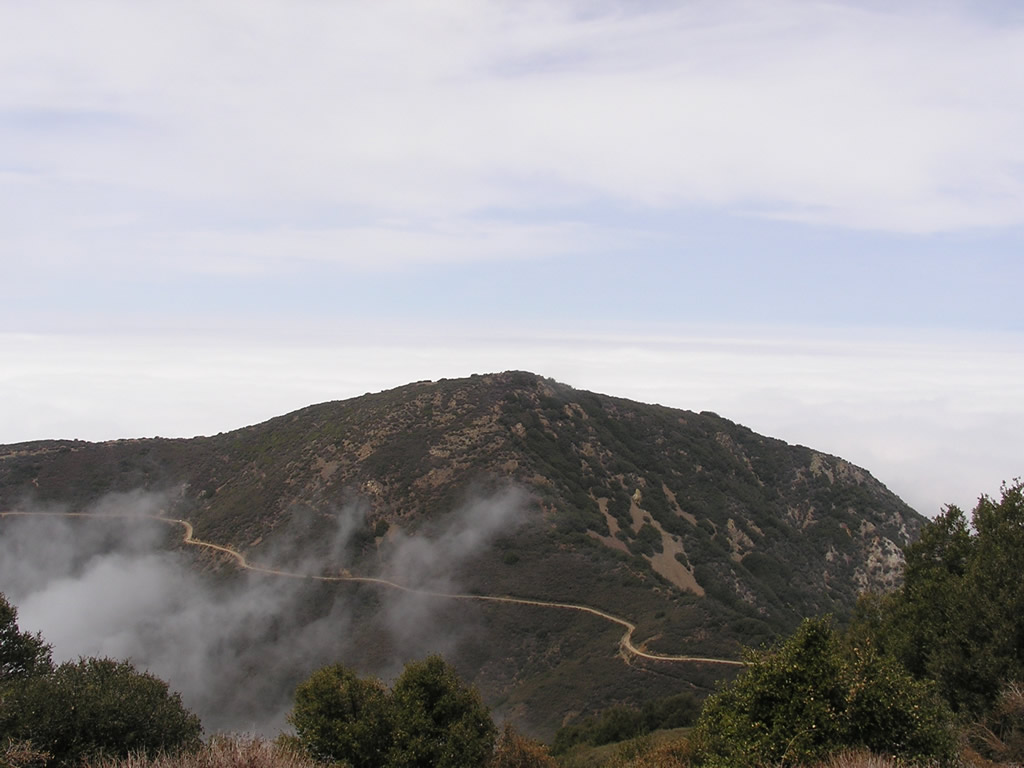
- Modjeska Peak as seen from nearby Santiago Peak

Highest point
- Elevation: 5,499 ft (1,676 m) NAVD 88
- Prominence: 536 ft (163 m)
- Coordinates: 33°43′11″N 117°32′42″W

Geography
- Location within California Location within the United States
- Location: Orange County, California, U.S.
- Parent range: Santa Ana Mountains
- Topo map: USGS Santiago Peak

Climbing
- Easiest route: Hike

Modjeska Peak is the northern mountain of the Saddleback landform in Orange County California. It is the second-highest peak of the Santa Ana Mountains, after Santiago Peak, whose summit is less than 0.6 mi (0.97 km) to the northwest. Modjeska lies within Cleveland National Forest and, despite being shorter than Santiago, has a smaller peak without manmade structures to obstruct views of the Pacific Ocean and San Gabriel Mountains.

The peak is named after the Shakespearean actress Helena Modjeska, who lived in Modjeska Canyon (on the western foot of the mountain) near the end of her life.

== History ==
The peak, which was formerly unnamed and generally lumped in with Santiago Peak, was dubbed Modjeska Peak following the death of Helena Modjeska. The Ebell Society of Santa Ana campaigned in June 1909 for the new name to honor Modjeska and the change was made sometime thereafter.

Aside from United States Forest Service rangers, the first recorded people to hike the new trail from Modjeska Canyon to Modjeska Peak were J. H. Scott and A. J. Perkins in April 1919. Following the creation of the new trail, Modjeska Peak became much more accessible to civilians. Hikes to the peak led by the Sierra Club became a regular occurrence and people from across Orange County and Los Angeles traveled to ascend the peak. Transport to the area was made possible by a bus service that connected the canyons to Pacific Electric's Santa Ana Line.

The Coors American Original 150, a 150-mile (240 km) mountain biking race from Palm Springs to Newport Beach, traversed Modjeska Peak as one of the two mountain ranges included in the race's course. The race took place on October 2, 1988.

Modjeska Peak formerly had radio and television infrastructure in place. In 1996, Pacific Bell began providing a Multichannel Multipoint Distribution Service ("wireless cable") television service in Southern California with its tower atop Modjeska Peak being one of the two broadcast sources. The Pacific Bell tower has since been removed and today most of the mountain range's wireless antennas are on the neighboring Santiago Peak.

=== Wildfires and incidents ===
Modjeska Peak was burned in a 1926 wildfire that began in Santiago Canyon on October 31. The flames headed east and crossed the ridge of Modjeska Peak, heading as far as Corona's Cold Water and Pine canyons on the east side of the mountains. Six inches of snow was recorded in the area on December 10 and Ranger J. B. Stephenson said that if the precipitation was rain, large-scale mudflows likely would have occurred as a result of the fire's burn scar.

On March 26, 1972, a Cessna 172H with one pilot and two passengers on board slammed into the side of Modjeska Peak, killing two. The plane originated from Las Vegas and was en route to Hawthorne Municipal Airport in the Los Angeles area. Since the plane crashed at night, the wreckage was not discovered until 15 hours later when a United States Marine Corps helicopter was flying over the area for training. The lone survivor of the crash was described as being in "satisfactory" condition and was only admitted to the hospital for observation. According to the National Transportation Safety Board report on the incident, the pilot of the plane became disoriented after one of the passengers repeatedly shined a flashlight in his face, leading to the descent into the side of Modjeska Peak.

In late November 1980, a fire called the Indian Canyon Fire was started by an arsonist. It burned 28,000 acres (11,000 ha) and reached the northwest corner of Modjeska Peak.

On December 27, 1999, a vehicle driving near the top of Modjeska Peak veered off the trail and crashed, leaving the motorist uninjured but starting a small brush fire. The fire was quickly extinguished.

The 2007 Santiago Fire burned through Modjeska Peak.
