= Villa Park, California =

City in California, United States

- City
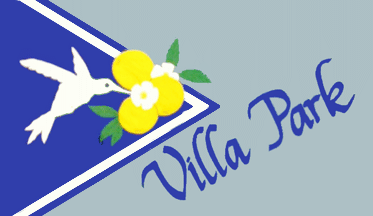
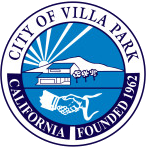
- Flag Seal
- Motto: The Hidden Jewel of Orange County
- Interactive map of Villa Park, California
- Coordinates: 33°48′58″N 117°48′40″W
- Country: United States
- State: California
- County: Orange
- Incorporated: January 11, 1962

Government
  - Type: Council–manager
  - Mayor: Nicol Jones
  - Mayor Pro Tem: Jordan Wu
  - City Council: Robert Frackelton; Kelly McBride; Crystal Miles
  - City Manager: Steve Franks

Area
  - Total: 2.08 sq mi (5.38 km^{2})
  - Land: 2.08 sq mi (5.38 km^{2})
  - Water: 0 sq mi (0.00 km^{2}) 0%
- Elevation: 341 ft (104 m)

Population (2020)
  - Total: 5,843
  - Density: 2,812.9/sq mi (1,086.06/km^{2})
- Time zone: UTC-8 (Pacific)
  - Summer (DST): UTC-7 (PDT)
- ZIP code: 92861
- Area codes: 657/714
- FIPS code: 06-82744
- GNIS feature IDs: 1661640, 2412158
- Website: www.villapark.org

Villa Park (VIL-uh) is a city in northern Orange County, California, United States. It was founded in 1962. At the 2020 census, the city had a population of 5,843, making it the smallest city in Orange County.

The city is largely zoned for single-family residences on lots that average about 20,000 square feet (1,900 m^{2}), or 1/2 acre, in size. Within the city limits there is one small shopping center. City Hall, including a community room, and a branch of the Orange County Public Libraries system is adjacent to the city's only shopping center.

== History ==
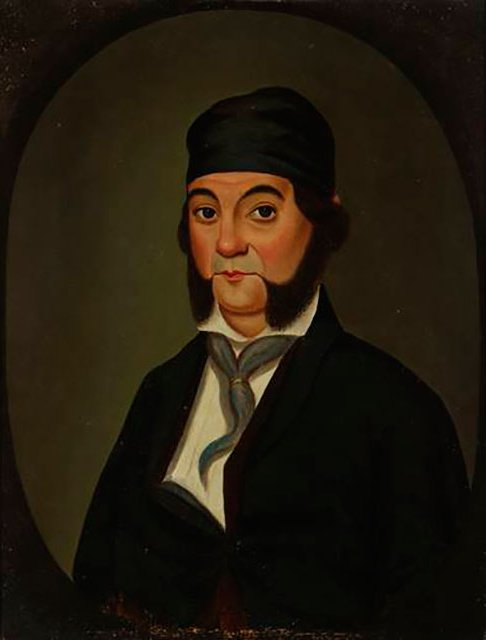
Don Bernardo Yorba, a wealthy Californio ranchero, owned Rancho Santiago de Santa Ana, which included all of modern-day Villa Park.

After the 1769 expedition of Gaspar de Portolá, a Spanish expedition led by Father Junípero Serra named the area Vallejo de Santa Ana (Valley of Saint Anne). On November 1, 1776, Mission San Juan Capistrano became the areas first permanent European settlement in Alta California, New Spain. In 1810, the Spanish Empire granted 62,500 acres (253 km^{2}) to Jose Antonio Yorba, which he named Rancho Santiago de Santa Ana. Yorba's rancho included the lands where the cities of Olive, Orange, Villa Park, Santa Ana, Tustin, Costa Mesa and Newport Beach stand today.

After the Mexican-American War in 1848, Alta California became part of the United States in 1850 and American settlers arrived in this area.

Villa Park was known as "Mountain View" in the 1860s. The U.S. Post Office refused to allow the local post office to be so named as there was already a post office with that name in Santa Clara County, so the post office and hence the area came to be called Villa Park after a town in Illinois. It was then an agricultural area producing, in turn, grapes, walnuts, and apricots. Finally, citrus became the major crop for about 60 years.

The Southern Pacific ran freight and limited passenger rail service stopping at Marlboro (33.8184°N 117.8631°W) and Gratto (33.8016°N 117.8428°W) stations to the west, and McPherson (33.7878°N 117.8225°W) and El Modena stations to the south, connecting to main lines at Tustin and Tustin Junction, near where Katella Ave. and State College Blvd. now cross in Anaheim's Platinum Triangle. (33.8058°N 117.8864°W) Passenger service on the Southern Pacific Tustin Branch operated from its opening in 1888 until it was discontinued in 1910.

Ranchers established the Serrano Water District in 1876, which still provides Villa Park's water, and founded the Villa Park Orchards Association (still a business in Orange, although the packing house that was a local landmark was torn down in 1983). Today, Serrano Water District imports water from the Metropolitan Water District of Southern California and stores it in the Santiago Reservoir. In addition, groundwater is pumped from an aquifer managed by Orange County Water District.

In 2005, the Orange County Local Agency Formation Commission (LAFCO) shrunk Villa Park's sphere of influence to zero due to its being landlocked by the city of Orange. Shortly after, LAFCO restored Villa Park's sphere of influence after an outcry from local community leaders.

== Geography ==
Villa Park is located at 33°48′58″N 117°48′40″W (33.816183, −117.811106). According to the United States Census Bureau, the city has a total area of 2.1 square miles (5.4 km^{2}), all land.

There are no public parks within city limits; many homes have pools and/or tennis courts. Unlike more urban areas of Orange County west of the city, Villa Park has winding streets with few sidewalks and limited street lights. Throughout are trees and flower beds in planted medians and parkways. Surrounded by the city of Orange, Villa Park has the appearance of an enclave due to the city's early unwillingness to annex lands beyond Santiago Creek and those east of a power line easement between the city and Anaheim Hills.

=== Biogeography ===
The most common native species: Hairy Sand Verbena, Red Sand Verbena, and Chaparral Sand Verbena.

Villa Park

Climate chart (precipitation, max. and min. temperature)
J	F	M	A	M	J	J	A	S	O	N	D
0.8 79 59	1.5 78 59	0.7 70 58	0.9 87 59	0 71 61	0 87 70	0 84 70	0 90 70	0 105 76	0 83 70	0 80 58	0 80 55
- █ Average max. and min. temperatures in °F
- █ Precipitation totals in inches
- Source: Weather Underground
Metric conversion
J	F	M	A	M	J	J	A	S	O	N	D
21 26 15	38 26 15	18 21 14	24 31 15	0 22 16	0 31 21	0 29 21	0 32 21	0 41 24	0 28 21	0 27 14	0 27 13
- █ Average max. and min. temperatures in °C
- █ Precipitation totals in mm

== Demographics ==
Historical population
Census	Pop.	Note	%±
1970	2,723		—
1980	7,137		162.1%
1990	6,299		−11.7%
2000	5,999		−4.8%
2010	5,812		−3.1%
2020	5,843		0.5%
U.S. Decennial Census; 1860–1870 1880-1890; 1900 1910 1920; 1930 1940 1950; 1960 1970 1980; 1990 2000 2010; 2020

Villa Park was first listed as a city in the 1970 U.S. census. Prior to that, the area was part of unincorporated Orange Township.

=== Racial and ethnic composition ===
Villa Park city, California – Racial and ethnic composition Note: the US Census treats Hispanic/Latino as an ethnic category. This table excludes Latinos from the racial categories and assigns them to a separate category. Hispanics/Latinos may be of any race.
Race / Ethnicity (NH = Non-Hispanic)	Pop 1980	Pop 1990	Pop 2000	Pop 2010	Pop 2020	% 1980	% 1990	% 2000	% 2010	% 2020
White alone (NH)	6,486	5,270	4,691	4,177	3,641	90.42%	83.66%	78.20%	71.87%	62.31%
Black or African American alone (NH)	23	27	41	42	47	0.32%	0.43%	0.68%	0.72%	0.80%
Native American or Alaska Native alone (NH)	-	11	22	26	2	-	0.17%	0.37%	0.45%	0.03%
Asian alone (NH)	334	660	769	848	1,116	4.66%	10.78%	12.82%	14.59%	19.10%
Native Hawaiian or Pacific Islander alone (NH)	334	660	2	1	5	4.66%	10.78%	0.03%	0.02%	0.09%
Other race alone (NH)	25	-	4	11	13	0.35%	-	0.07%	0.19%	0.22%
Mixed race or Multiracial (NH)	x	x	116	109	295	x	x	1.93%	1.88%	5.05%
Hispanic or Latino (any race)	269	331	354	598	724	3.75%	5.25%	5.90%	10.29%	12.39%
Total	7,173	6,299	5,999	5,812	5,843	100.00%	100.00%	100.00%	100.00%	100.00%

=== 2020 census ===
As of the 2020 census, Villa Park had a population of 5,843 and a population density of 2,813.2 inhabitants per square mile (1,086.2/km^{2}). The racial makeup was 64.9% White, 0.9% African American, 0.1% Native American, 19.3% Asian, 0.1% Pacific Islander, 3.4% from other races, and 11.3% from two or more races. Hispanic or Latino people of any race were 12.4% of the population.

The census reported that 99.5% of the population lived in households, 0.5% lived in non-institutionalized group quarters, and no one was institutionalized. 100.0% of residents lived in urban areas, while 0.0% lived in rural areas.

There were 1,943 households, out of which 30.2% included children under the age of 18, 74.1% were married-couple households, 2.0% were cohabiting couple households, 16.4% had a female householder with no partner present, and 7.6% had a male householder with no partner present. 12.0% of households were one person, and 9.2% were one person aged 65 or older. The average household size was 2.99. There were 1,648 families (84.8% of all households).

The age distribution was 18.0% under the age of 18, 7.7% aged 18 to 24, 15.8% aged 25 to 44, 30.6% aged 45 to 64, and 27.9% who were 65 years of age or older. The median age was 51.8 years. For every 100 females, there were 97.2 males, and for every 100 females age 18 and over, there were 94.9 males age 18 and over.

There were 2,020 housing units at an average density of 972.6 units per square mile (375.5 units/km^{2}), of which 1,943 (96.2%) were occupied. 3.8% of housing units were vacant. Of occupied units, 94.5% were owner-occupied, and 5.5% were occupied by renters. The homeowner vacancy rate was 1.0%; the rental vacancy rate was 8.3%.

=== Demographic estimates ===
In 2023, the US Census Bureau estimated that the median household income was $204,750, and the per capita income was $92,434.

=== 2010 census ===
The 2010 United States census reported that Villa Park had a population of 5,812. The population density was 2,796.6 inhabitants per square mile (1,079.8/km^{2}). The racial makeup of Villa Park was 4,550 (78.3%) White (71.9% Non-Hispanic White), 42 (0.7%) African American, 34 (0.6%) Native American, 854 (14.7%) Asian, 1 (0.0%) Pacific Islander, 162 (2.8%) from other races, and 169 (2.9%) from two or more races. There were 598 people of Hispanic or Latino origin (10.3%).

The census reported that 5,767 people (99.2% of the population) lived in households, 40 (0.7%) lived in non-institutionalized group quarters, and 5 (0.1%) were institutionalized.

There were 1,976 households, out of which 625 (31.6%) had children under the age of 18 living in them, 1,525 (77.2%) were opposite-sex married couples living together, 123 (6.2%) had a female householder with no husband present, 80 (4.0%) had a male householder with no wife present. There were 36 (1.8%) unmarried opposite-sex partnerships, and 8 (0.4%) same-sex married couples or partnerships. 208 households (10.5%) were made up of individuals, and 144 (7.3%) had someone living alone who was 65 years of age or older. The average household size was 2.92. There were 1,728 families (87.4% of all households); the average family size was 3.11.

There were 1,164 people (20.0%) under the age of 18, 458 people (7.9%) aged 18 to 24, 845 people (14.5%) aged 25 to 44, 1,934 people (33.3%) aged 45 to 64, and 1,411 people (24.3%) who were 65 years of age or older. The median age was 49.6 years. For every 100 females, there were 97.4 males. For every 100 females age 18 and over, there were 93.8 males.

There were 2,016 housing units at an average density of 970.1 per square mile (374.6/km^{2}), of which 1,886 (95.4%) were owner-occupied, and 90 (4.6%) were occupied by renters. The homeowner vacancy rate was 0.5%; the rental vacancy rate was 3.2%. 5,486 people (94.4% of the population) lived in owner-occupied housing units and 281 people (4.8%) lived in rental housing units.

== Government ==
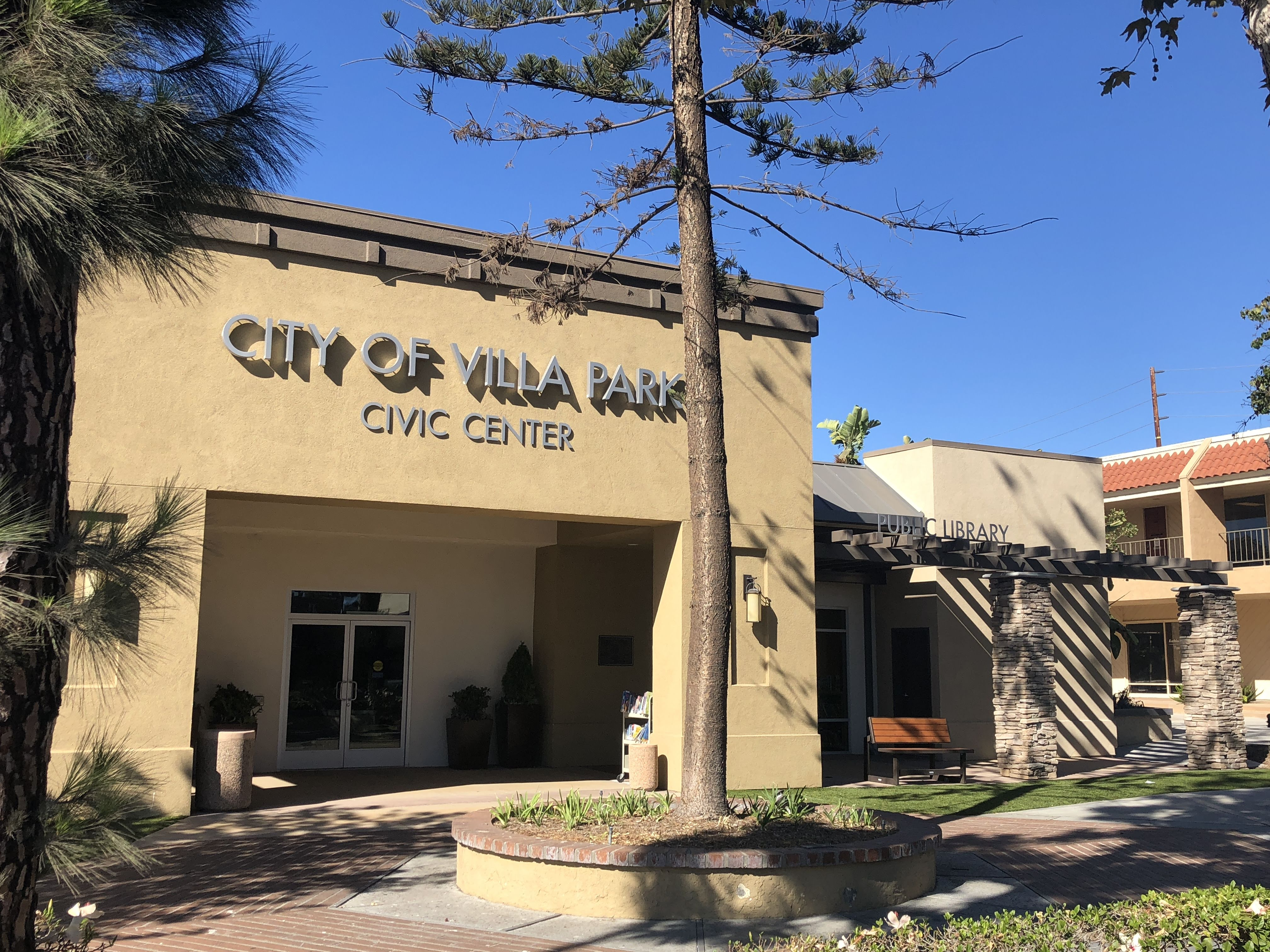
Civic Center and Library

The city is governed by five council members each elected for four-year terms. The current (2025) representatives on the City Council include Mayor Jordan Wu, Mayor Pro-Tem Robert Frackelton and Councilmembers Nicol Jones, Kelly McBride and Crystal Miles.

=== Politics ===
A total of 66.0% of the city's 4,533 registered voters declared their affiliation with the Republican Party; 17.3% are registered Democrats, and 14.3% were unaffiliated voters.

In the United States House of Representatives, Villa Park is in California's 40th congressional district, represented by Republican Young Kim.

In the California State Legislature, Villa Park is in the 37th senatorial district, represented by Republican Steven Choi, and in the 59th Assembly district, represented by Republican Phillip Chen.

On the Orange County Board of Supervisors, Villa Park is in the 3rd District, represented by Donald P. Wagner.

Villa Park is one of the most consistently Republican cities in Orange County and in California as a whole. Every GOP candidate for president since the city's incorporation in 1962 has received at least 60% of the vote in the city. From 1968 to 1988, the city gave the Republican candidate over 80% of the vote in each election. Villa Park is also largely Republican in California's gubernatorial elections. In 1978, even as Orange County supported Jerry Brown in his re-election bid, Villa Park gave his opponent Evelle Younger 57% of the vote.

Villa Park city vote by party in presidential elections
Year	Democratic	Republican	Third Parties
2024	35.50% 1,379	**61.72%** 2,398	2.78% 108
2020	37.90% 1,573	**60.12%** 2,495	1.98% 82
2016	30.23% 1,098	**60.38%** 2,193	9.39% 341
2012	24.71% 928	**73.00%** 2,742	2.40% 90
2008	27.08% 1,021	**70.39%** 2,653	2.52% 95
2004	22.11% 830	**75.60%** 2,838	2.29% 86
2000	22.29% 782	**75.63%** 2,654	2.08% 73
1996	19.98% 655	**73.00%** 2,393	7.02% 230
1992	17.75% 646	**65.11%** 2,370	17.14% 624
1988	15.25% 557	**83.82%** 3,062	0.93% 34
1984	12.33% 414	**87.10%** 2,924	0.57% 19
1980	9.95% 331	**83.32%** 2,773	6.73% 224
1976	18.52% 554	**80.38%** 2,405	1.10% 33
1972	13.46% 245	**81.09%** 1,476	5.44% 99
1968	13.85% 108	**81.79%** 638	4.36% 34
1964	23.86% 131	**76.14%** 418

Villa Park city vote by party in gubernatorial elections
Year	Democratic	Republican	Third Parties
2018	31.06% 1,072	**68.94%** 2,379
2014	24.68% 619	**75.32%** 1,889
2010	19.87% 658	**77.05%** 2,552	3.08% 102
2006	11.05% 323	**83.20%** 2,432	5.75% 95
2003	8.06% 248	**90.77%** 2,792	1.17% 36
2002	16.43% 357	**79.02%** 1,717	4.56% 99
1998	26.42% 750	**71.82%** 2,039	1.76% 50
1994	12.56% 428	**84.47%** 2,878	2.96% 101
1990	17.11% 519	**79.16%** 2,401	3.73% 113
1986	12.71% 379	**86.22%** 2,571	1.07% 32
1982	22.16% 681	**76.73%** 2,358	1.11% 34
1978	34.06% 947	**57.41%** 1,596	8.53% 237
1974	22.02% 457	**76.24%** 1,582	1.73% 36
1970	15.74% 164	**83.11%** 866	1.15% 12
1966	13.66% 81	**86.34%** 512
1962	17.62% 71	**80.40%** 324	1.99% 8

NOTE: The totals listed for the 2003 governor's special election are the aggregate totals for all Republican candidates, all Democratic candidates, and all Independent candidates. Individually, Arnold Schwarzenegger received 2,391 votes, Cruz Bustamante received 234 votes, and Tom McClintock received 384 votes.

Villa Park city vote by party in senate elections
Year	Democratic	Republican	Third Parties
2018	**54.11%** 1,442	45.89% 1,223
2016	**54.29%** 1,594	45.71% 1,342
2012	26.97% 979	**73.03%** 2,651
2010	18.65% 614	**78.38%** 2,581	2.98% 98
2006	26.41% 740	**69.81%** 1,956	3.78% 106
2004	24.75% 909	**72.28%** 2,654	2.97% 109

NOTE: In the 2016 and 2018 senate elections in California, both candidates on the ballot were Democrats. The bolded totals listed were those of the candidates that won Villa Park Kamala Harris in 2016, and Dianne Feinstein in 2018. The runners-up in Villa Park were shaded in blue as well, but wound up in the Republican column of this table.

=== Crime ===
The Uniform Crime Report (UCR), collected annually by the FBI, compiles police statistics from local and state law enforcement agencies across the nation. The UCR records Part I and Part II crimes. Part I crimes become known to law enforcement and are considered the most serious crimes including homicide, rape, robbery, aggravated assault, burglary, larceny, motor vehicle theft, and arson. Part II crimes only include arrest data. The 2023 UCR Data for Villa Park is listed below:

2023 UCR Data
	Aggravated Assault	Homicide	Rape	Robbery	Burglary	Larceny Theft	Motor Vehicle Theft	Arson
Villa Park	1	0	0	1	14	18	10	1

== Registered Historic Places ==
- Smith and Clark Brothers Ranch Grounds
- Villa Park School

== Education ==
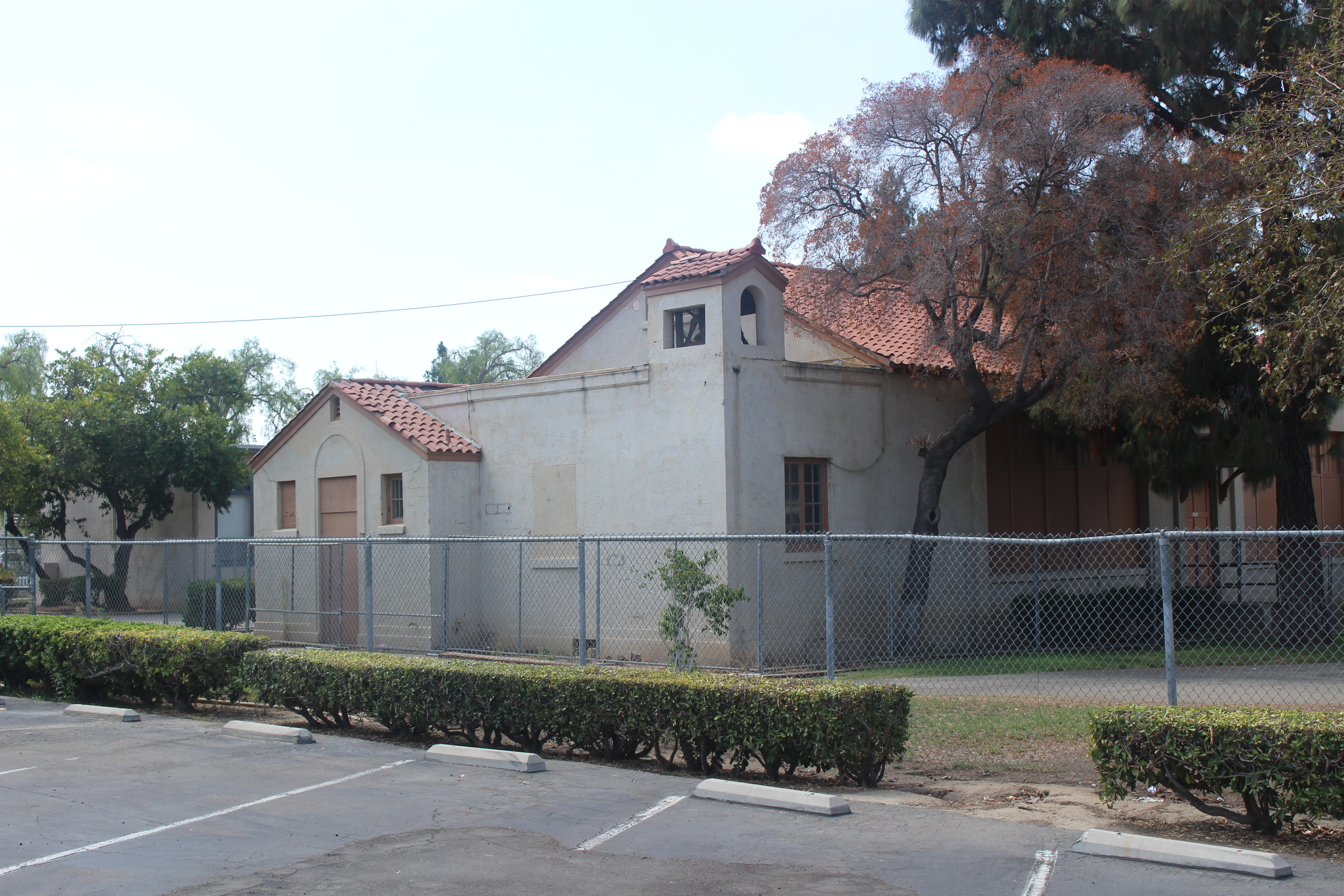
Villa Park School, 10551 Center Dr. Villa Park

There are four public schools with the city that are operated by the Orange Unified School District (the city's largest employer).

- Serrano Elementary School
- Villa Park Elementary
- Cerro Villa Middle School
- Villa Park High School

== Infrastructure ==
Orange County Transportation Authority operates bus transportation in Villa Park.

== Notable people ==
- Bert Blyleven, Major League Baseball player
- Aaron Boone, Major League Baseball player and current manager of the New York Yankees
- Rosalind Chao, actress
- Aaron Corp, University of Richmond football quarterback
- Kevin Costner, actor, graduated from Villa Park High School in 1973
- Leigh Donovan, professional mountain bike racer, graduated from Villa Park High School in 1990
- Jose Feliciano, singer, entertainer
- Freddie Freeman, Major League Baseball player
- Susan McCaw, former United States ambassador to Austria
- Pat McInally, former National Football League player
- Nolan Ryan, Major League Baseball player
- Josh Samuels (born 1991), Olympic water polo player
- L.J. Smith, author, The Vampire Diaries
- James Sofronas, racing driver and entrepreneur
- Mark Trumbo, Major League Baseball player, graduated from Villa Park High School in 2005
- Del Worsham, professional drag racer
