= Ice block (disambiguation) =

Ice block may refer to:

- Ice block – another name for an ice pop.
- Ice blocking – a recreational activity in which individuals race to the bottom of a hill sitting on large blocks of ice.
- ICEBlock – an online map.
