= Hetebrink House =

Historic house in California, United States

- U.S. National Register of Historic Places
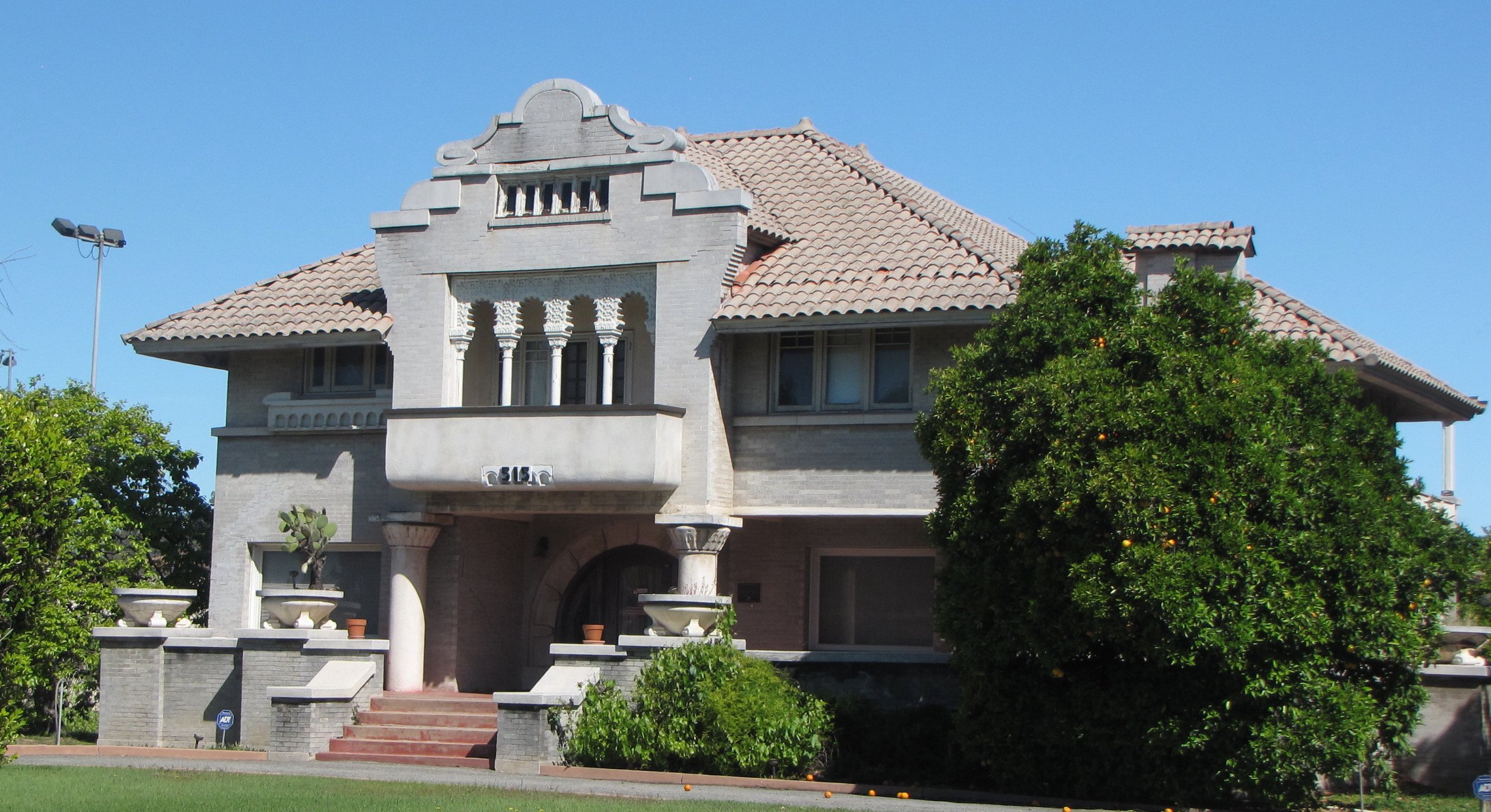

- Location within the Los Angeles metropolitan area
- Location: 515 East Chapman Ave, Fullerton, CA 92832
- Coordinates: 33°52′28.3″N 117°54′53.7″W
- Area: ~4,500 square feet
- Built: 1914
- Architect: Elwing and Tedford Bishop and Cole
- Architectural style: Mission Revival
- NRHP reference No.: 93000597
- Added to NRHP: July 1, 1993

The Hetebrink House is a Mission Revival style historic home in Fullerton, California, built in 1914 for John Hetebrink. Located on the south-east corner of what is now Fullerton College, the building has been uninhabited since 2001.

== History ==
John Hetebrink —the "Tomato King" — was one of the original settlers of Fullerton and owned two 40-acre ranches north of Chapman Avenue, much of which is now occupied by Fullerton College and California State University, Fullerton. Although the land the house stands on was originally a tomato field, the ranches are said to have held walnut and orange groves as well. Hetebrink built the house in 1914, the year after Fullerton College opened next-door.

Albert "Pete" Hetebrink is the third of John's seven children (1900-2001) and Fullerton College's 1923 student body president.

In the 1970s, Pete offered the property to Fullerton College, which had by then bought up much of the surrounding acreage the ranch originally occupied. There exists debating stories on the order of events, but the result was Pete later rescinded his offer, with the reason being the college had planned to turn it into a parking-lot (joining the two lots that currently flank it).

The house was submitted to the National Register of Historic Places on May 24, 1993, and added on July 1 of the same year.

The house is still owned by the Hetebrink family. The last known resident of the house was Pete, and has been left unoccupied since his death in 2001. As of March 2019, the structure itself has been in a state of disrepair.
