= Fred Jung =

American politician (born 1973)

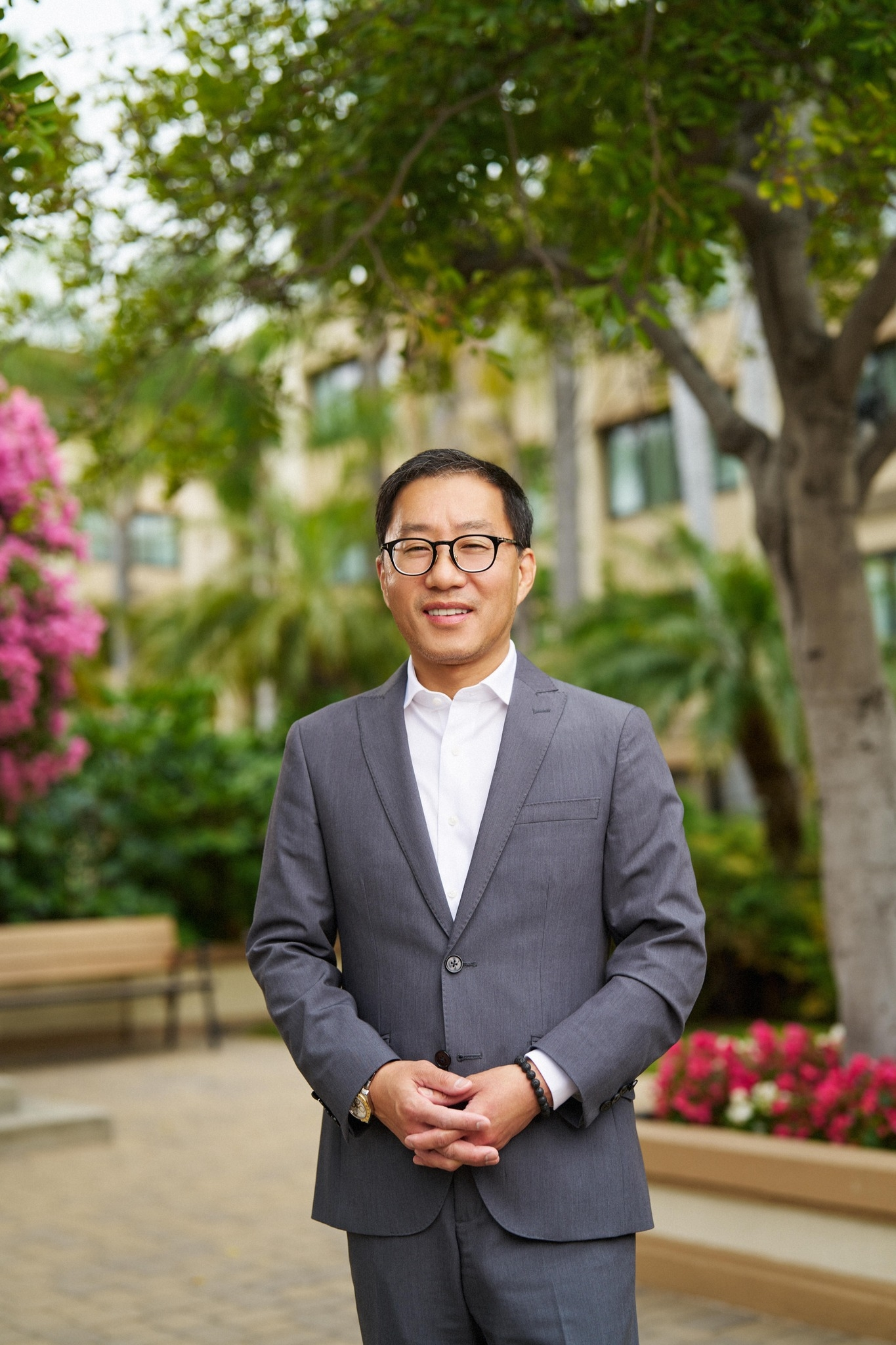

Mayor of Fullerton, California
- In office 2025–present
- Preceded by: Nick Dunlap
- In office 2021–2023
- Preceded by: Bruce Whitaker
- Succeeded by: Nick Dunlap

Mayor pro tem of Fullerton, California
- In office 2023–2024
- Preceded by: Bruce Whitaker
- Succeeded by: Shana Charles

Member of the Fullerton City Council, District 1
- In office 2021–present
- Preceded by: Office established

Korean name
- Hangul: 정홍주
- RR: Jeong Hongju
- MR: Chŏng Hongju

Personal details
- Born: October 5, 1973 (age 53) Seoul, South Korea
- Children: 5

Fred H. Jung (born October 5, 1973) is an American politician serving as the mayor of Fullerton, California. He was first elected to the Fullerton City Council in 2020 and re-elected in 2024. Jung announced his candidacy for the Orange County Board of Supervisors in the 2026 election, seeking to represent District 4.

== Early life and education ==
Jung was born in Seoul, South Korea, and immigrated to the United States with his family at the age of five. He has lived in Fullerton, California, since 1987. He attended Sunny Hills High School and University of Southern California.

== Political career ==
=== Fullerton City Council ===
Jung was elected to the Fullerton City Council in November 2020, representing District 1. He became the city's first Korean American council member. He was appointed mayor by the council in December 2021, December 2022, and again in 2024. As mayor, Jung presides over council meetings and serves as the ceremonial head of the city.

In 2025, Jung announced his candidacy for the Orange County Board of Supervisors, running to succeed termed-out Supervisor Doug Chaffee in District 4, which includes Fullerton, Anaheim, Buena Park, La Habra, and Placentia.

=== Regional roles ===
In addition to serving on the Fullerton City Council, Jung serves on various the board of various regional agencies.

==== Orange County Power Authority ====
Jung serves on the board of OCPA, a public energy provider. He was elected Chair of the board in 2023 and reappointed in 2024.

==== LOSSAN Rail Corridor Agency ====
Jung serves as Chair of the LOSSAN Rail Corridor Agency, which oversees the Amtrak Pacific Surfliner service. He represents the Orange County Transportation Authority on the board.

==== Orange County Transportation Agency ====
Jung is a member of the OCTA Board of Directors, representing Fullerton and the 4th Supervisorial District. He also serves as chair of the Transit Committee.

==== Metropolitan Water District of Southern California ====
Jung serves as a board member of MWD, representing Fullerton overseeing water policy and infrastructure for Southern California. He also serves as Chair of the Legislative and Communications Committee within the MWD.

==== Orange County Water District ====
Jung was appointed in January 2025, Jung represents Division 10 (Fullerton) on the OCWD Board. His term extends through December 2028.

==== Local issues ====
In 2025, the Fullerton City Council voted to discontinue the display of newspapers and free publications at City Hall, citing a content-neutral policy. Jung supported the policy.

On March 4, 2025, Jung introduced an agenda item for the Fullerton City Council to explore the possibility of transitioning Fullerton from a general law city to a charter city. In California, charter cities are governed by their own municipal charters rather than the state's general law, allowing for greater local control over municipal affairs such as elections, contracts, and land use. Jung cited concerns about state-imposed mandates and expressed interest in increasing local authority over city governance.

== Electoral history ==
=== County of Orange – June 2, 2026 ===
==== Primary election for Orange County Board of Supervisors District 4 ====
District 4
Candidate	Votes	%
✓ Connor Traut	37,726	33.27%
✓ Tim Shaw	35,446	31.26%
Rose Espinoza	20,258	17.87%
Fred Jung	19,955	17.60%

=== City of Fullerton – November 5, 2024 ===
==== General election for Fullerton City Council District 1 ====
District 1
Candidate	Votes	%
✓ Fred Jung	7,432	72.10%
Matthew "Matt" Truxaw	2,882	27.09%

=== City of Fullerton – November 3, 2020 ===
==== General election for Fullerton City Council District 1 ====
District 1
Candidate	Votes	%
✓ Fred Jung	6,400	51.27%
Andrew Cho	6,083	48.73%
