= Fullerton Arboretum =

Botanical garden in Fullerton, California

Arboretum and Botanical Garden at Cal State Fullerton
- Fullerton Arboretum
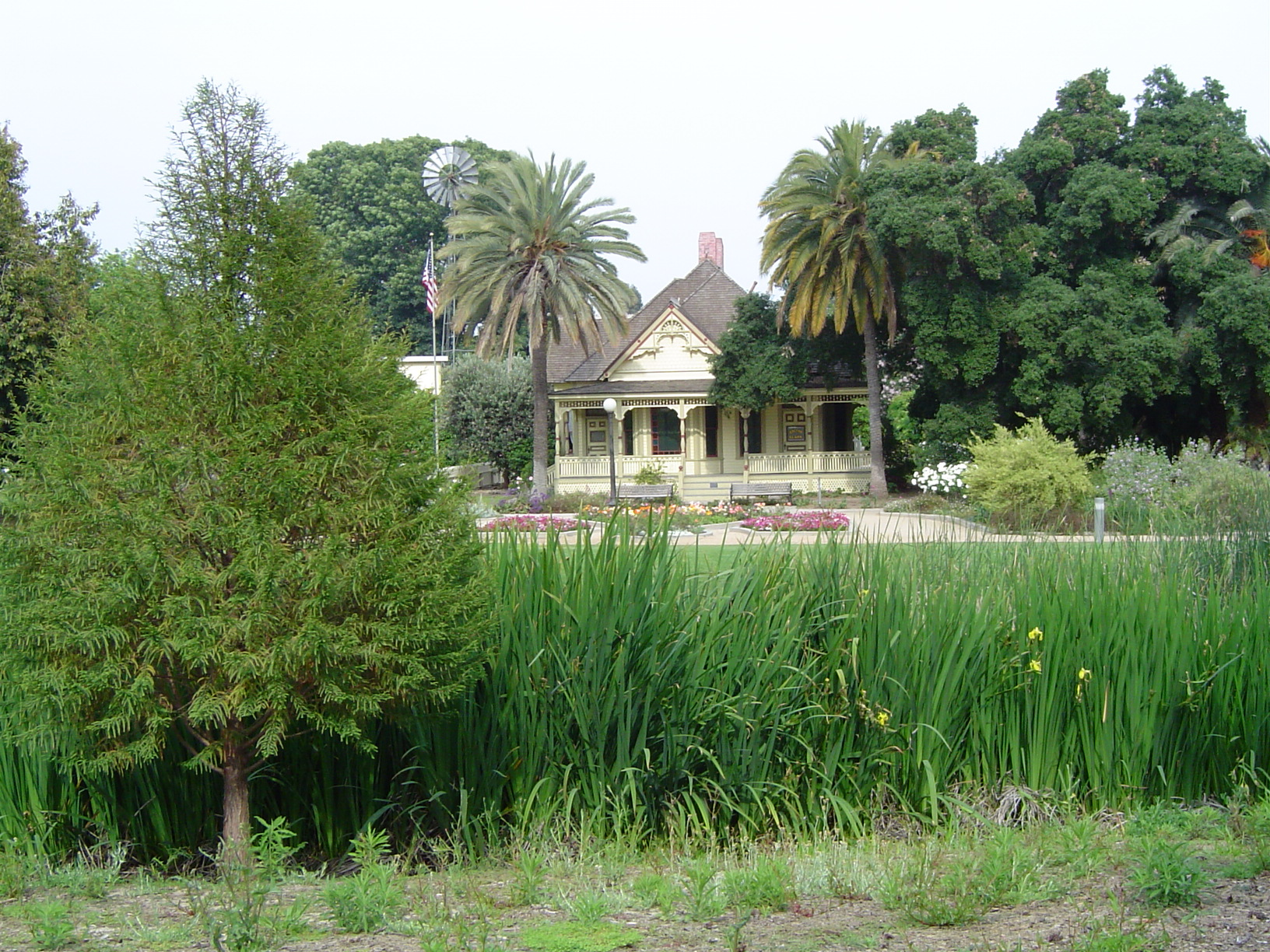
- Heritage House in the Arboretum.

- Location within California Location within the United States
- Type: Public
- Location: Fullerton, California
- Nearest city: Fullerton
- Coordinates: 33°53′14″N 117°52′59″W
- Area: 26 acres (11 ha)
- Created: 1976
- Status: Closed on same holidays observed by CSUF
- Website: arboretum.fullerton.edu

Arboretum and Botanical Garden at Cal State Fullerton is a 26-acre (11 ha) botanical garden with a collection of plants from around the world, located on the northeast corner of the California State University, Fullerton campus in Fullerton, California, in the United States. It is the largest botanical garden in Orange County, California with a collection of over 4,000 plants. The Arboretum saves species that are extinct or near extinction and serves as a learning place for agricultural history.

The Arboretum officially was created in 1976, and officially opened in 1979. The arboretum, which was originally a diseased orange grove, was transformed into organic gardening plots. A centerpiece of the Arboretum is the Heritage House, which was built in 1894 as the home and office of Fullerton's pioneer physician, Dr. George C. Clark. In 1972 the house was moved to what is now the middle of the Arboretum.

The Arboretum's garden paths wander through four major collections: Cultivated, Woodlands, Mediterranean and Desert Collections. Highlights include Southern California native vegetation, Rare Fruit Grove, an 11,000 sq ft (1,000 m^{2}) organic vegetable garden, historic Citrus and Avocados, Channel Islands Garden, an extensive Cycad Collection, Conifer Collection, Palm Grove, Community Gardens, and a Children's Garden.

The Arboretum gives people the opportunity to teach and learn about the environment. They work with students and faculty from a variety of different campus departments and gather information. The research that is done is shared throughout Orange County.

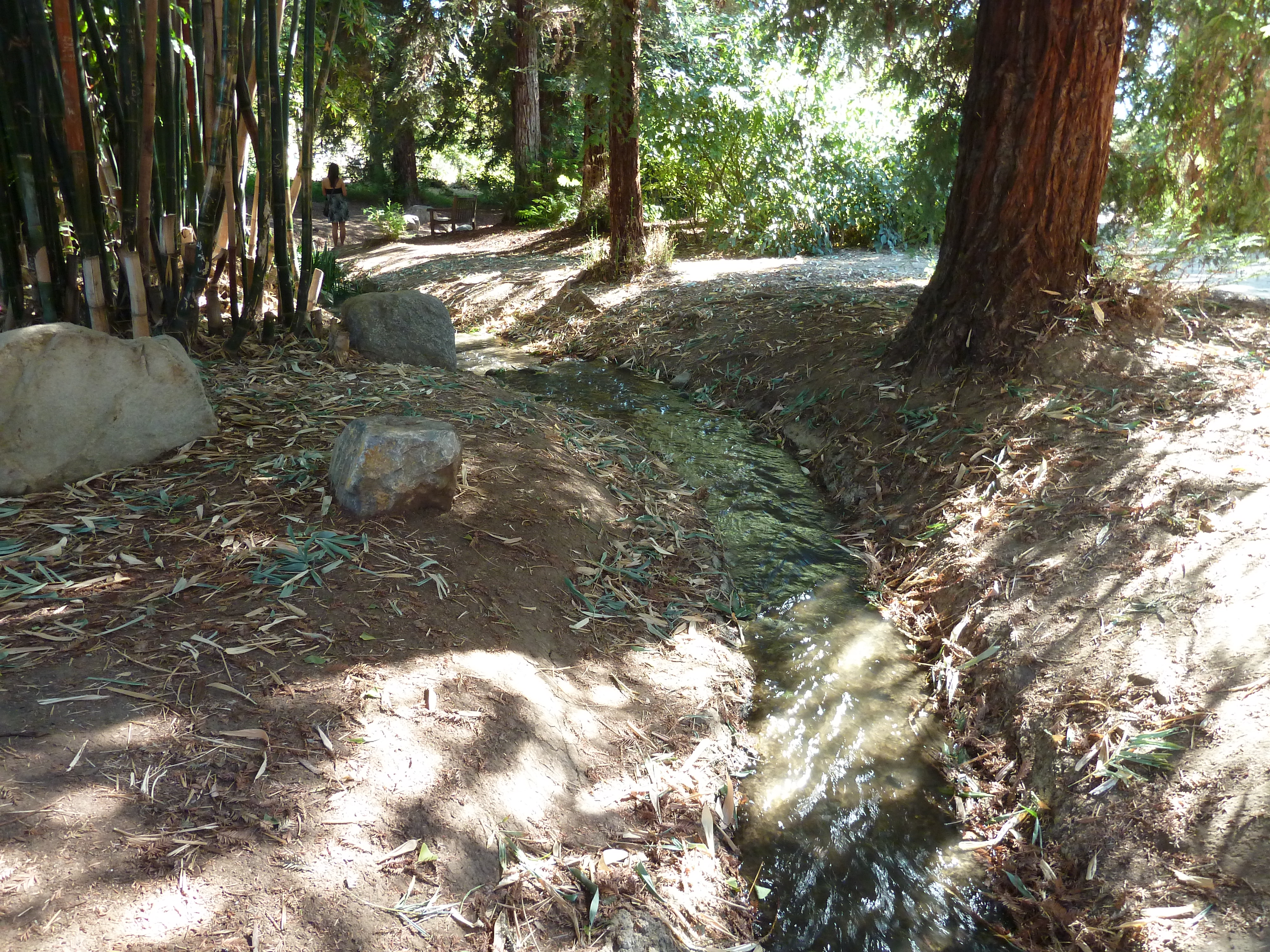
Inside of the Fullerton Arboretum

== History ==
The idea of creating an arboretum on the northern part of Orange State College's campus, later known as California State University Fullerton, came from Drs. David Walkington and Eugene Jones. The land had originally been an orange grove and suffered a disease called "quick decline", which led to the death of the trees. Teri Jones, along with other faculty wives, worked together to find support for developing the land into an arboretum. The Arboretum Committee was formed and they later won a Disneyland Community Service Award for its environmental efforts.

The Associated Students of Cal State College started funding for the project in 1971. Students and faculty worked together to use the land for organic gardening plots to show the environmental values of organic gardening. The trees were cut down and roots were removed.

In 1972, the idea of setting the land aside for a botanical garden came about. The Arboretum Society was formed and they started fundraisers on campus to build a botanical garden. They also asked the City of Fullerton to assist with the future Fullerton Arboretum, in an attempt to gain official community support for the project. The Trustees of the California State University system approved the planning of the botanical garden at California State University, Fullerton and allotted 26 acres of land for the project.

The same year, a group called the Friends of Fullerton Arboretum was created out of the Arboretum Society in order to begin development. The Friends organization became a tax-exempt, non-profit corporation that helped raise funds for the project and continues to exist to this day.

An architectural firm was hired in 1976 to draw schematics for the arboretum. In October 1977, the contractors for the project were awarded $621,000 to begin construction.

December 11, 1977, was the day the formal groundbreaking ceremony took place. The official opening ceremony occurred on October 21, 1979.

In 2004, a visitors' center with classrooms, a pavilion, museum, and other modifications was created.

== Museums ==
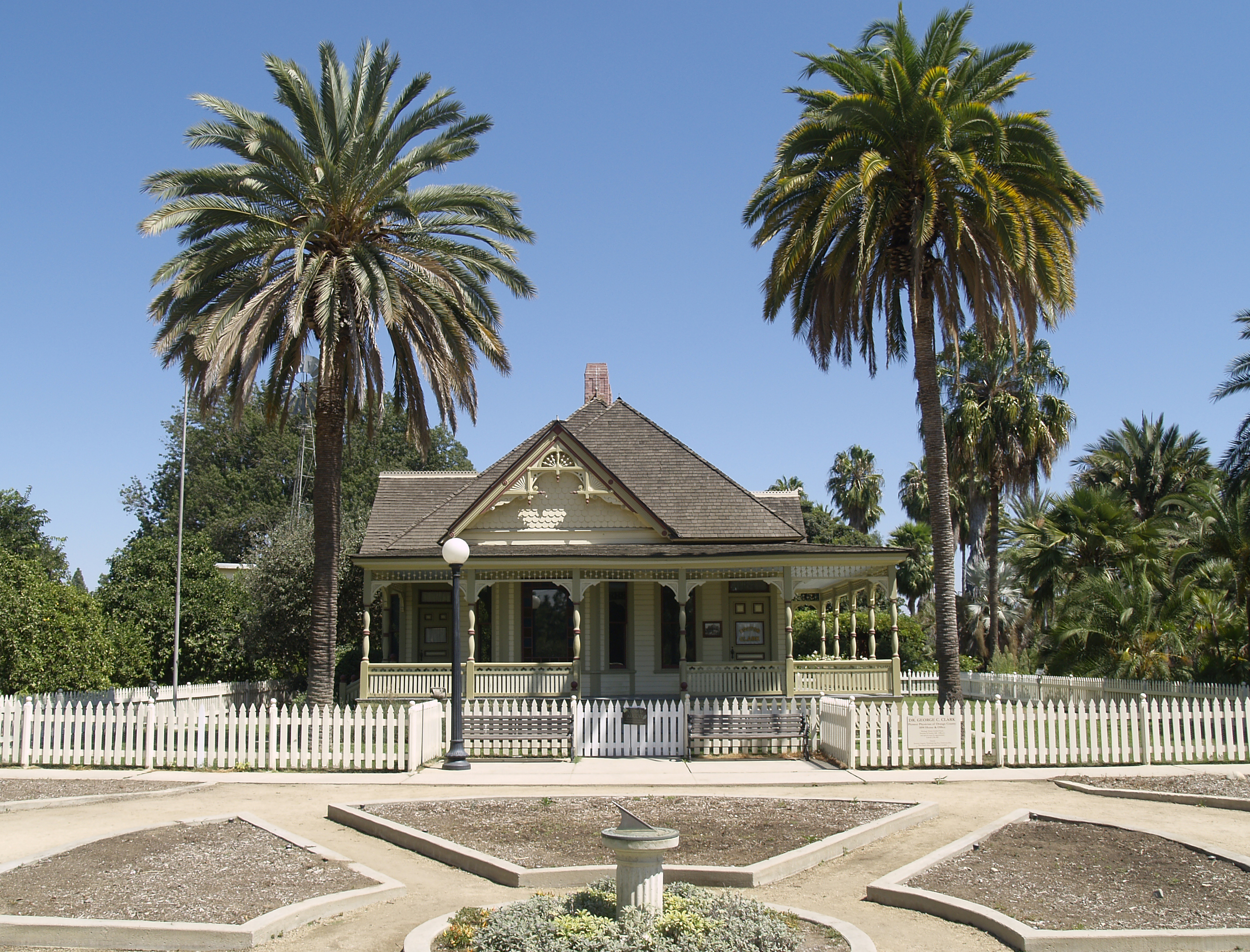
Heritage House

The Orange County Agricultural and Nikkei Heritage Museum is located on the grounds of the Arboretum and Botanical Garden at Cal State Fullerton, and highlights the region's agricultural history, as well as the contributions of the local Japanese American community and other pioneering farmers.

Heritage House is a historic house museum decorated as a doctor's home and office of the 1890s. It is one of the oldest surviving homes constructed in the original townsite of Fullerton. The Eastlake-style cottage was built by one of Fullerton's pioneer doctors, Dr. George Crook Clark, in 1894. The home was moved to the arboretum campus in 1972 to save it from demolition. It was originally located at the corner of Amerige and Harvard (Lemon) in the center of Fullerton.

== Gallery ==
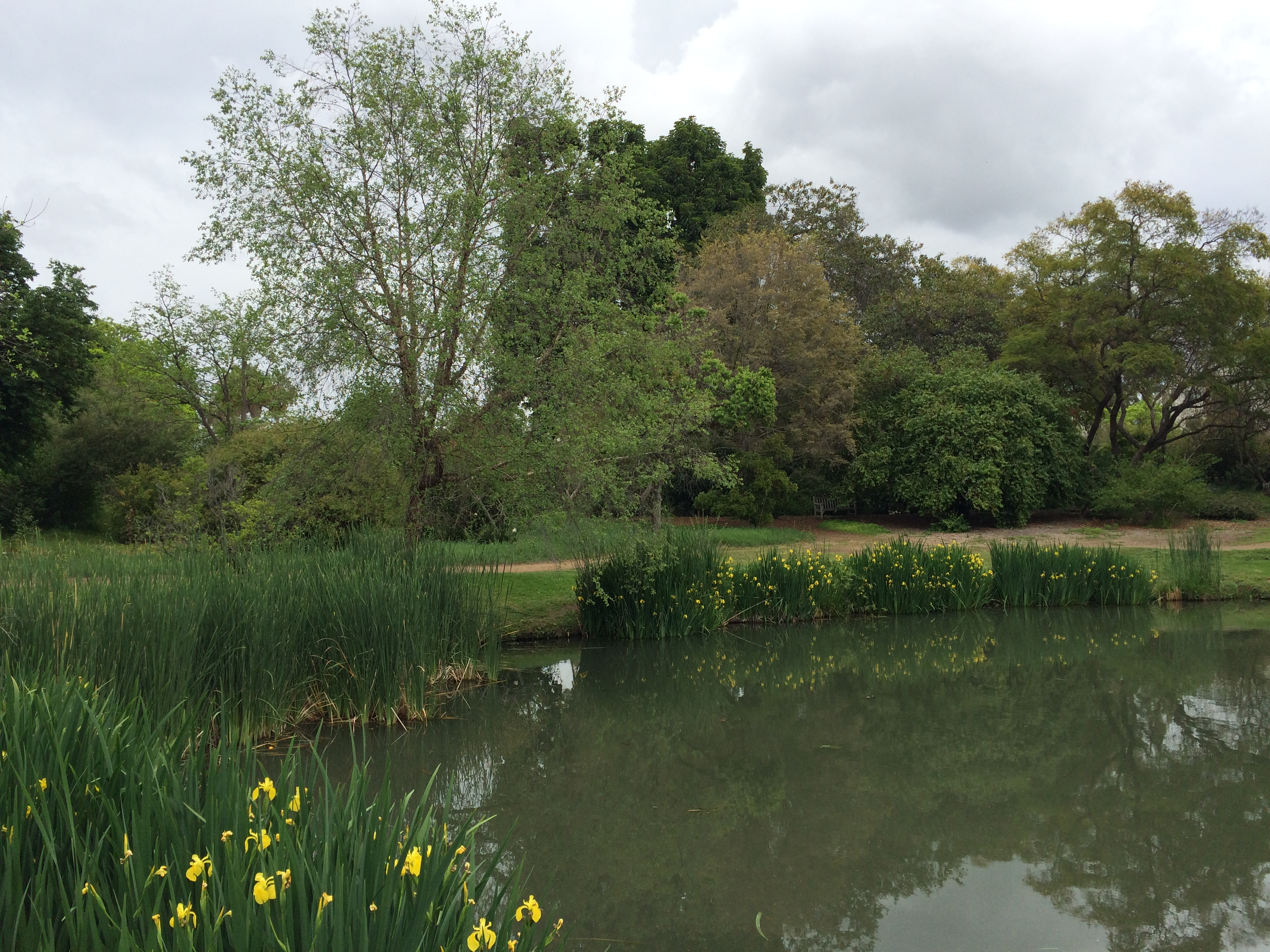

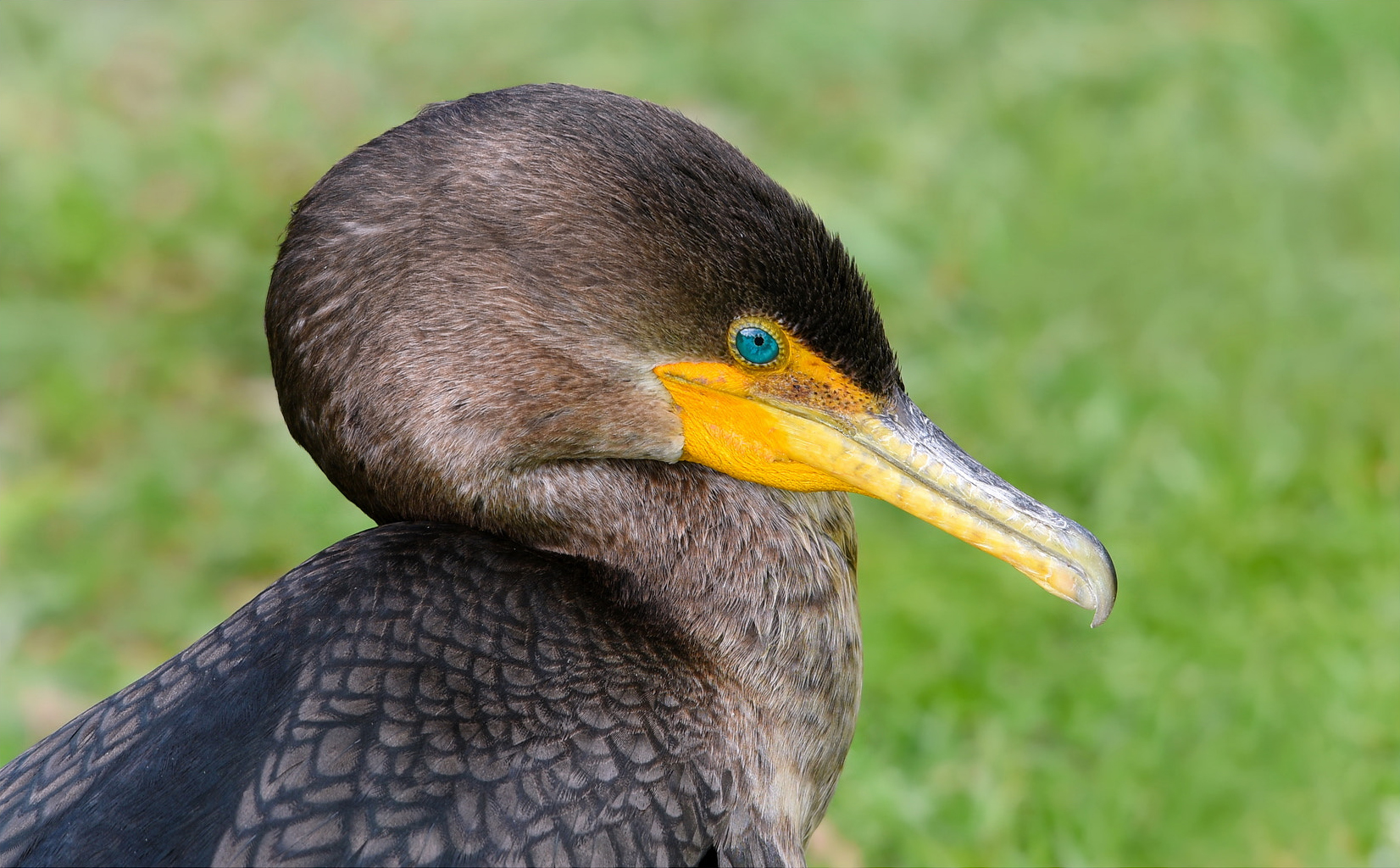

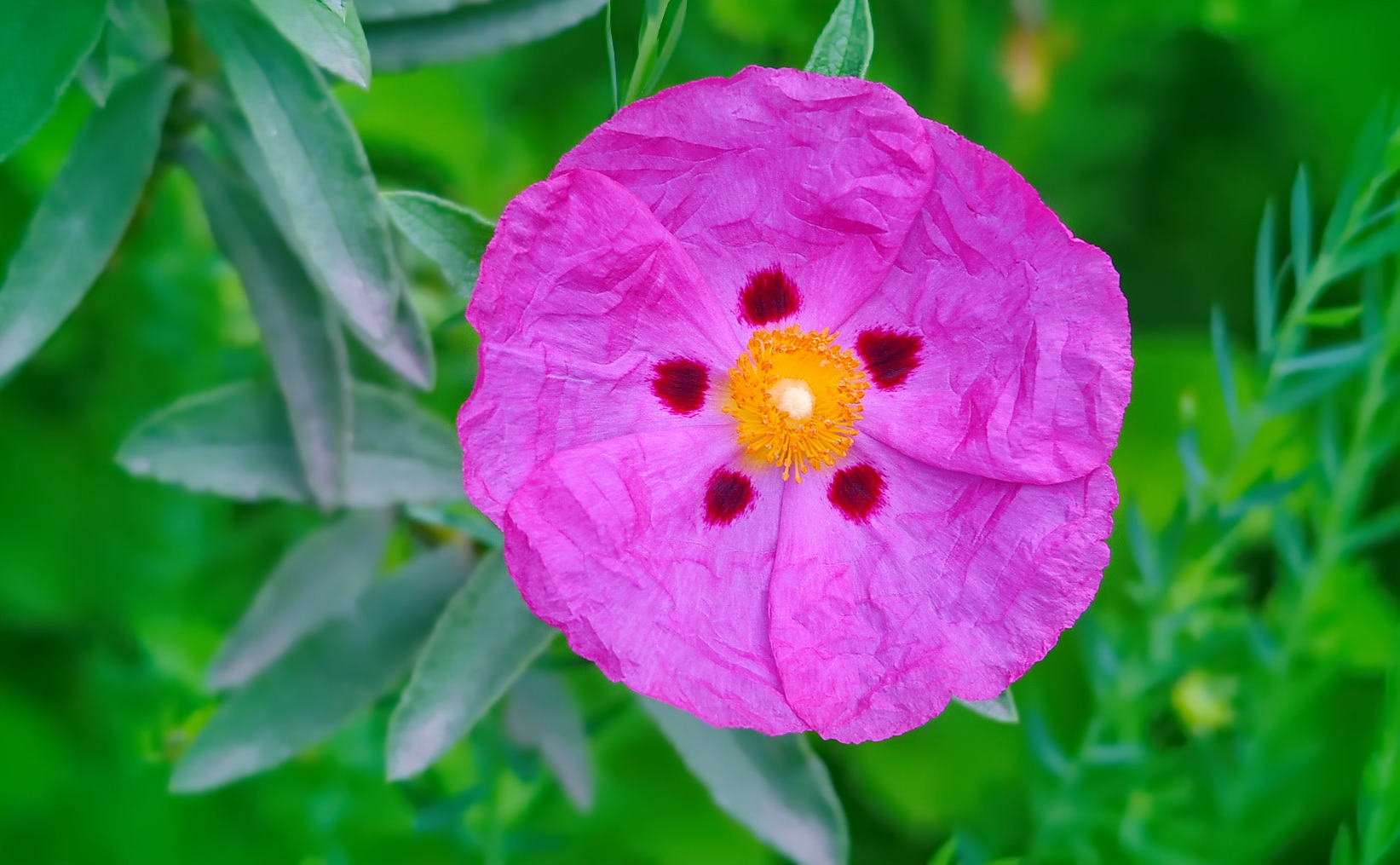

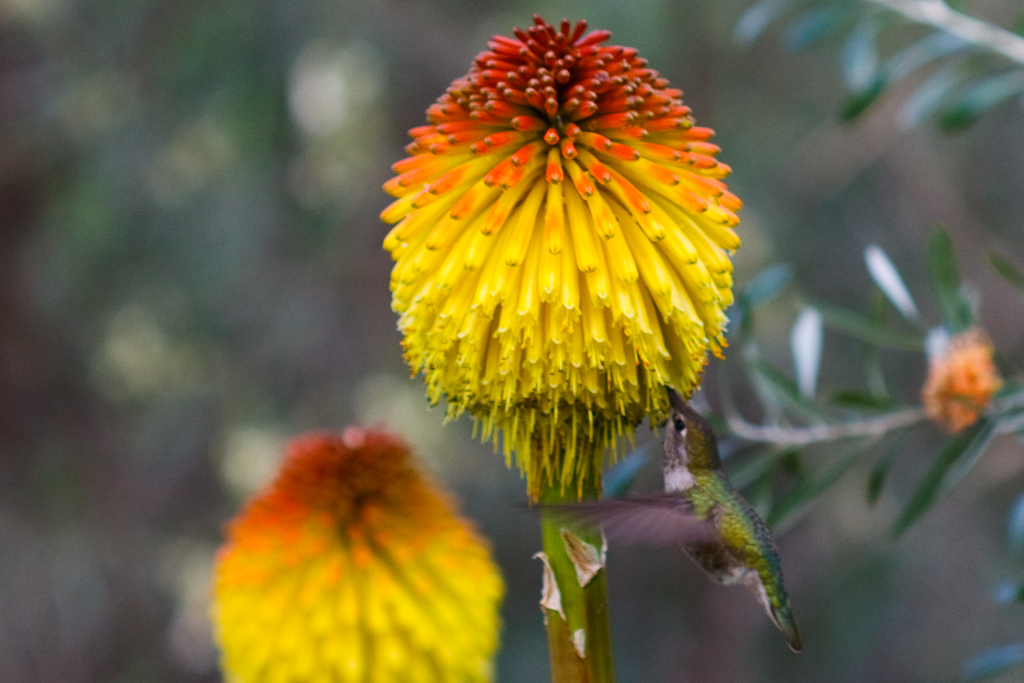

== See also ==
- List of botanical gardens in the United States
- North American Plant Collections Consortium
