= Hillcrest Park (Fullerton) =

Park in Fullerton, California

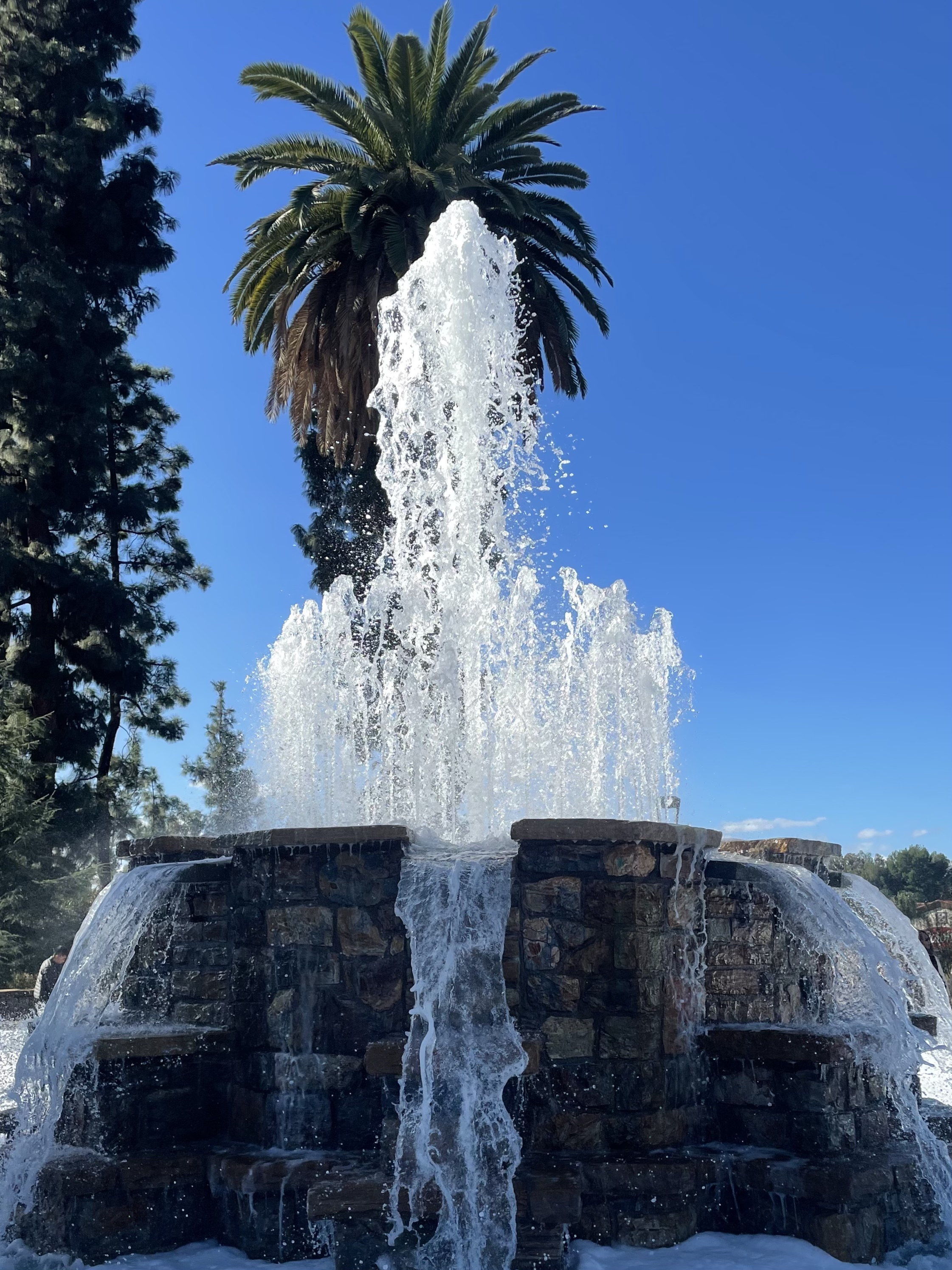
- Fountain on park's western edge
- Interactive map of Hillcrest Park
- Type: Municipal public park
- Location: 1200 N Harbor Blvd Fullerton, CA 92832
- Coordinates: 33.882850°N 117.922246°W
- Area: 37.8 acres (15 ha)
- Created: 1922
- Operator: Fullerton Department of Parks and Recreation
- Public transit: OC Bus 43, 143

Hillcrest Park is a 37.8 acres (15 ha) park in Fullerton, California. Opened in 1922, it is the oldest park in the city of Fullerton. The park is located north of Downtown Fullerton and Fullerton College between Brea Boulevard, Harbor Boulevard, Valley View Drive, and Lemon Street. It is operated by the Fullerton Department of Parks and Recreation.

The park is nestled among hilly terrain, offering views to the west and south from its peak. Within the park are a large historic fountain, picnic areas, trails, restrooms, the Hillcrest Stairs, and the Hillcrest Recreation Center.

== Features and amenities ==
A large historic fountain constructed by the Works Progress Administration in the 1930s is located in the park along Harbor Boulevard. The fountain was inoperable from the 1970s until a major renovation of the park was completed in 2018, which also restored the Great Lawn in front of the fountain, as well as a bridge across Brea Creek.

The Hillcrest Park Duck Pond is located to the north of the historic fountain. The duck pond, which had fallen into disrepair, was restored and improved in renovations in 2020.

Hillcrest Park became a fitness destination following the opening of the Hillcrest Steps in 2017. The wood steps provide access to the peak of Hillcrest Park from Lions Field, a group of softball fields on the western side of the park. Along the steps are staggered small observation decks with benches.

== Korean War Memorial ==
The Orange County Korean War Memorial is located along the edge of the park near Brea Boulevard. The granite memorial is engraved with the names of all 36,591 U.S. service members who died as a result of their military service during the Korean War. The memorial was unveiled on Veterans Day 2021.
