= Fullerton, California =

- City
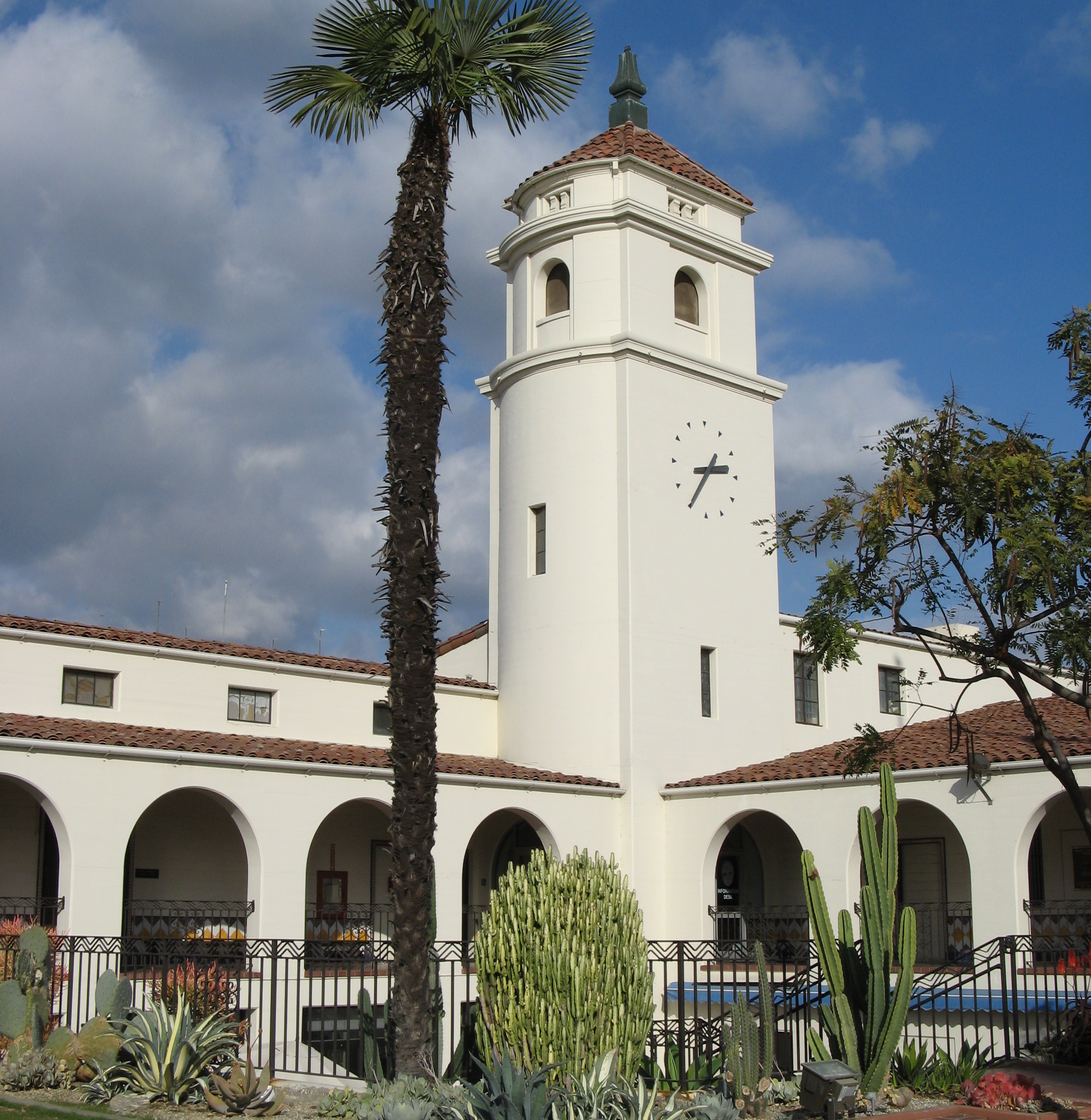
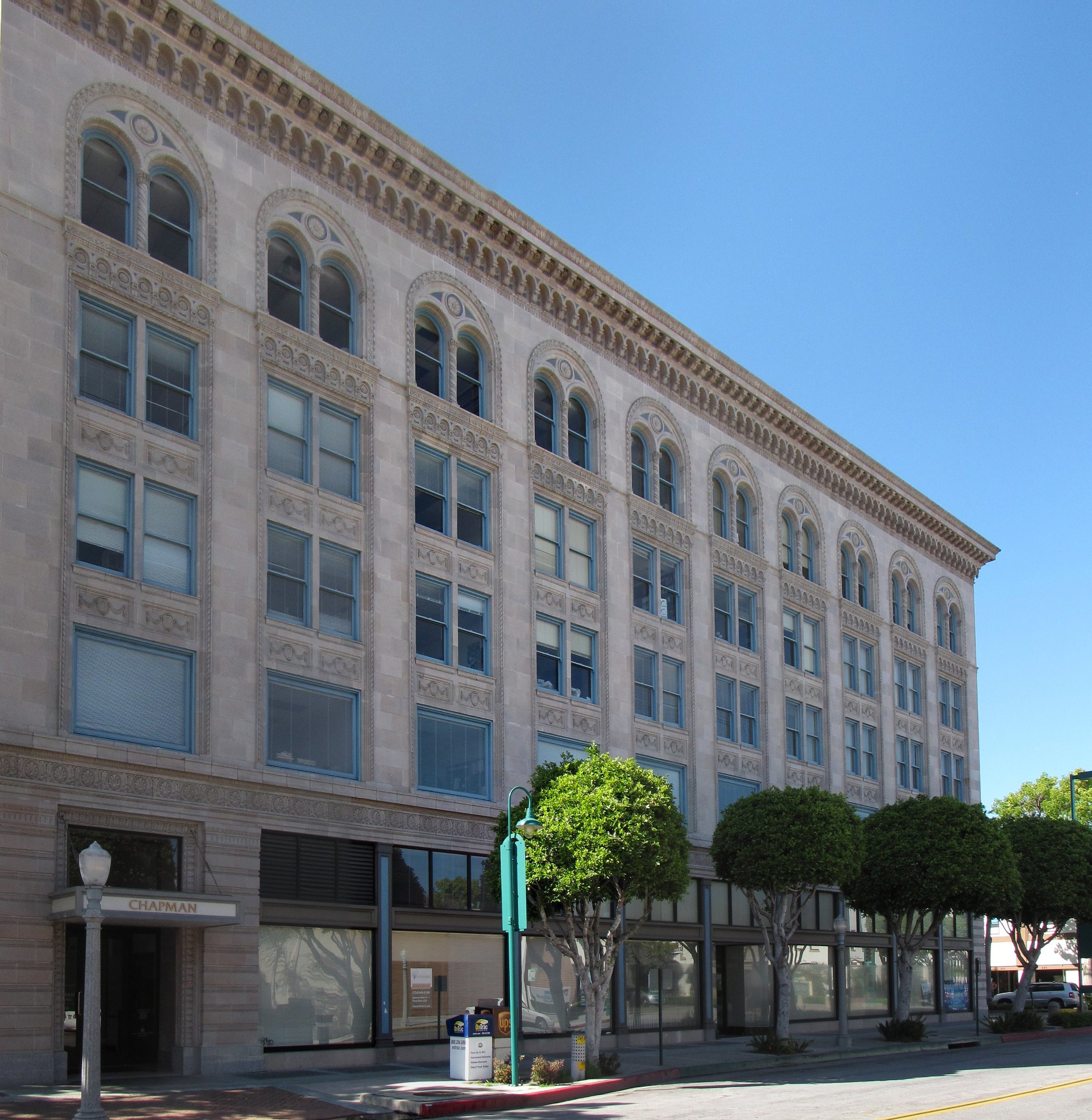
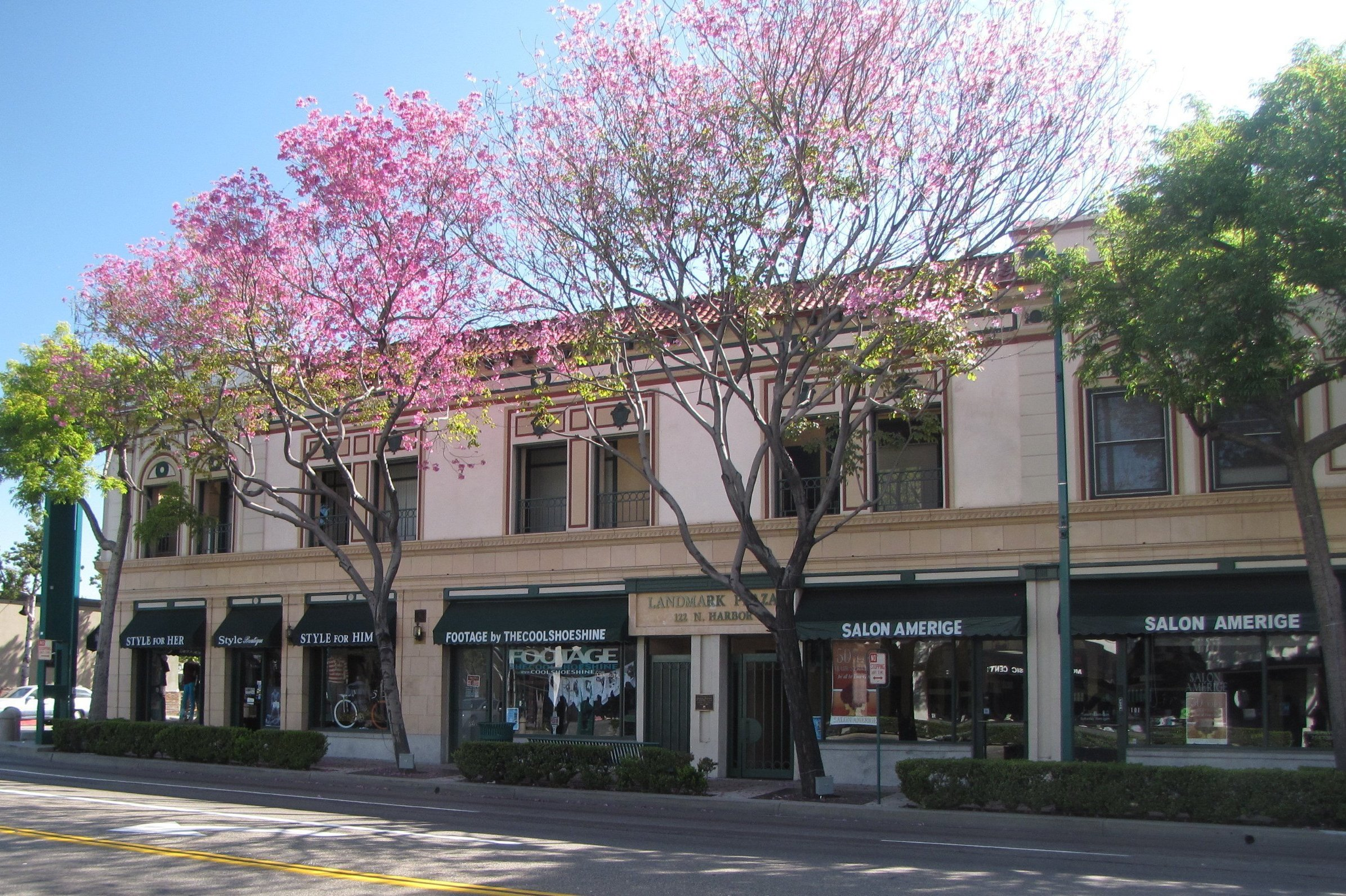
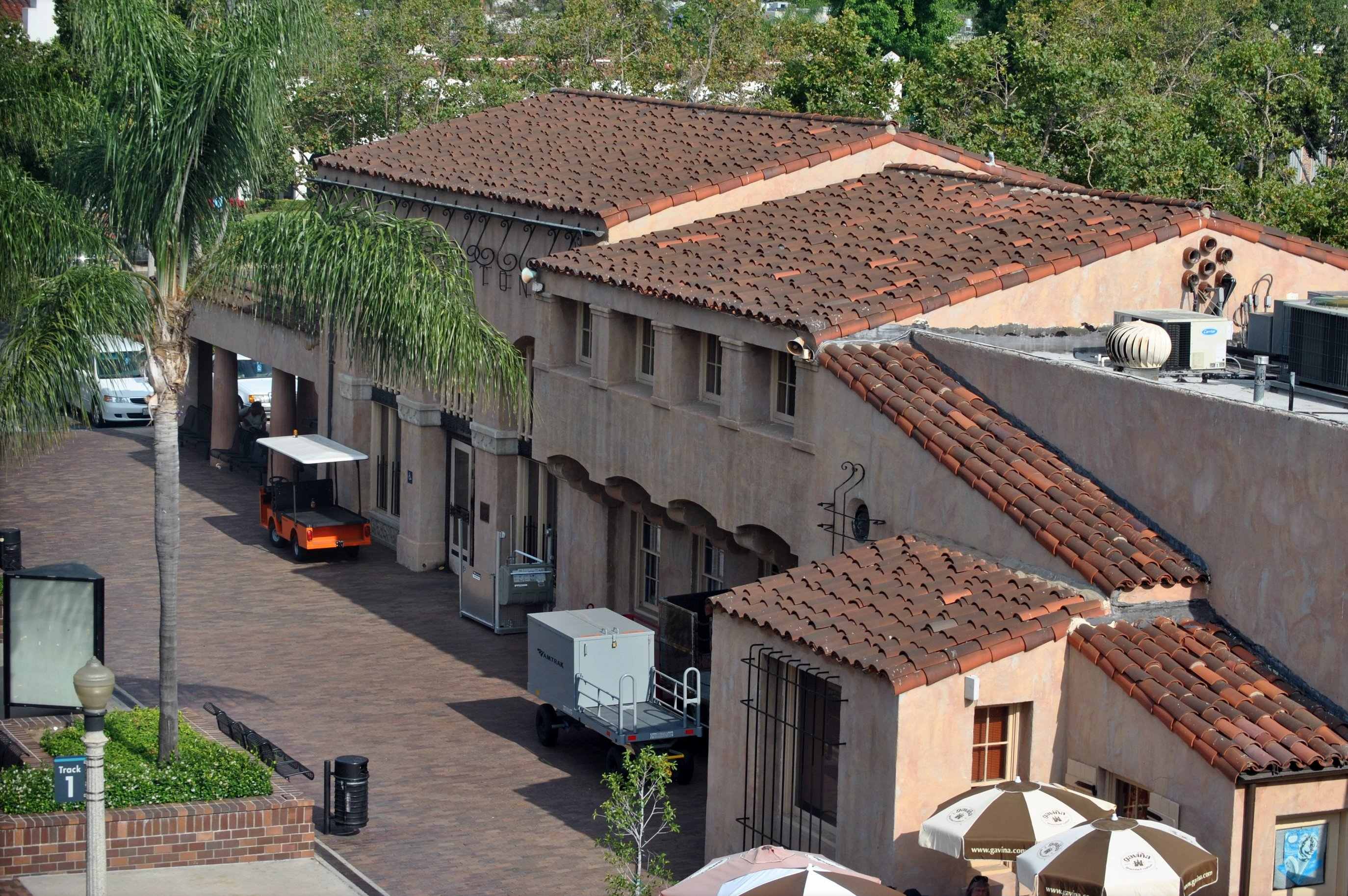
- Clockwise from top left: Old City Hall; the Chapman Building; Fullerton Transportation Center; and downtown

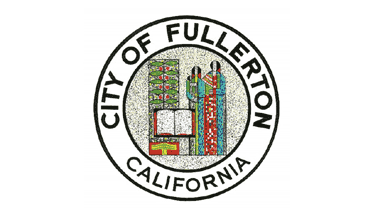
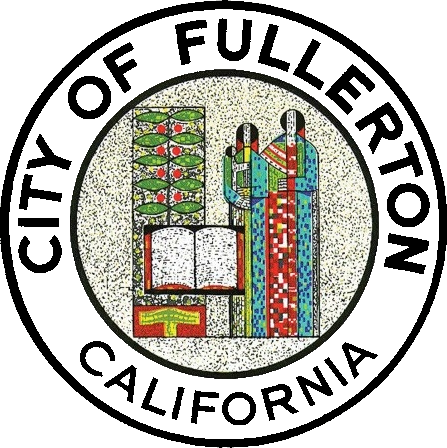
- Flag Seal
- Motto: "The Education Community"
- Interactive map of Fullerton, California
- Location in the contiguous United States Fullerton, California (the United States)
- Coordinates: 33°52′48″N 117°55′43″W
- Country: United States
- State: California
- County: Orange
- Incorporated: February 15, 1904

Government
  - Type: Council-Manager
  - Mayor: Fred Jung
  - Mayor Pro Tem: Nick Dunlap
  - City Council: Ahmad Zahra; Shana Charles; Jamie Valencia
  - City Manager: Eddie Manfro

Area
  - Total: 22.44 sq mi (58.11 km^{2})
  - Land: 22.42 sq mi (58.07 km^{2})
  - Water: 0.012 sq mi (0.03 km^{2}) 0.05%
- Elevation: 160 ft (50 m)

Population (2020)
  - Total: 143,617
  - Rank: 6th in Orange County; 42nd in California; 197th in the United States
  - Density: 6,410/sq mi (2,475/km^{2})
- Demonym: Fullertonian
- Time zone: UTC−8 (PST)
  - Summer (DST): UTC−7 (PDT)
- ZIP Codes: 92831–92838
- Area codes: 562, 657/714
- FIPS code: 06-28000
- GNIS ID: 1660658, 2410556
- Website: cityoffullerton.com

Fullerton (/ˈfʊlərtən/ FUUL-ər-tən) is a city in northern Orange County, California, United States. As of the 2020 census, the city had a total population of 143,617.

Fullerton was founded in 1887. Historically, it was a center of agriculture, notably groves of Valencia oranges and other citrus crops, as well as petroleum extraction; transportation; and manufacturing. It is home to numerous higher educational institutions, particularly California State University, Fullerton and Fullerton College. From the mid-1940s through the late 1990s, Fullerton was home to a large industrial base made up of aerospace contractors, canneries, paper products manufacturers, and is considered to be the birthplace of the electric guitar, due in large part to Leo Fender. The headquarters of Vons, which is owned by Albertsons, is located in Fullerton near the Fullerton–Anaheim line.

== History ==
=== Indigenous ===
Evidence of prehistoric animal habitation, such as saber-toothed cats and mammoths, is present in Ralph B. Clark Regional Park in the northwest of the city.

The area of the city was a part of the homelands of the Tongva for thousands of years. There was a large village in the area along the Santa Ana River that has since been identified as the Hutuknga. The village was one of the largest throughout all of Tovaangar, or the Tongva world. It was connected by marriage ties to other villages in the area, including Genga. Acorns and seeds from grasses and sages were regularly cultivated. Trade connections were established with villages on the coast and those further inland.

=== Spanish era ===
Europeans first passed through the area in 1769 when Gaspar de Portolá led a Spanish expedition north to Monterey. From the description recorded in the diary of Father Juan Crespi, the party camped on July 29 near present-day Laguna Lake, in the Sunny Hills area.

=== American era ===
Fullerton was founded in 1887 and named after George H. Fullerton, who at the time was president of the Pacific Land and Improvement Company, a subsidiary of the Atchison, Topeka and Santa Fe Railway. Fullerton, on behalf of the California Central Railway (another Santa Fe subsidiary at the time), helped secure the right of way for the railroad to go through where the city is now. George and Edward Amerige, two brothers from Malden, Massachusetts, who came to California in 1886, purchased 430 acres and would become the founders of the city. In 1894, Charles Chapman purchased an orange orchard in eastern Fullerton. The Valencia oranges he promoted from his Santa Ysabel Ranch, well suited to the local climate, proved a boon to producers; Fullerton boasted more orange groves than any other municipality in the United States. Cultivation of walnuts and avocados also flourished, and the Western railroad town became an agricultural center. Fullerton was incorporated in 1904,

=== Boom years ===
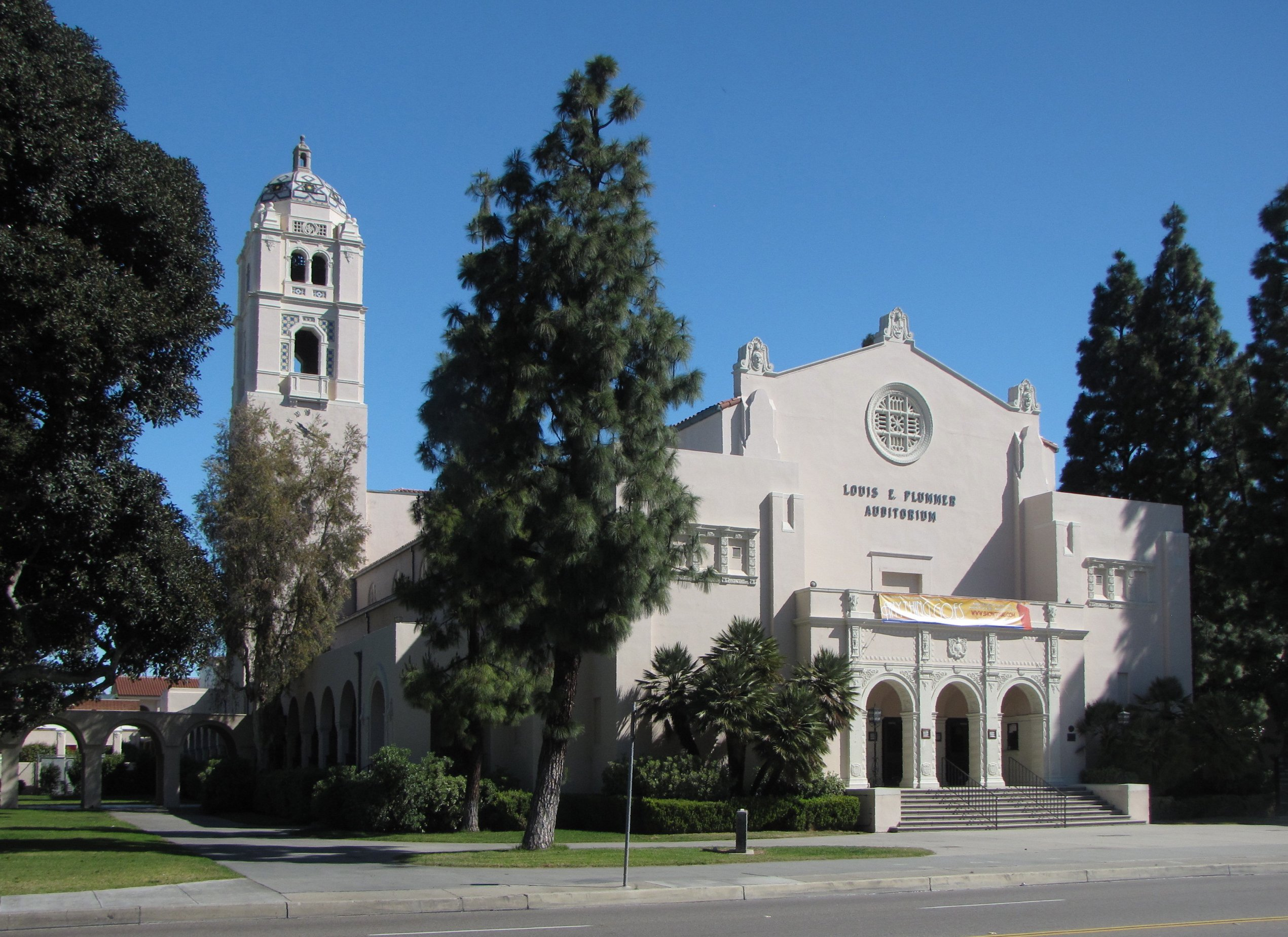
Fullerton Union High School's auditorium, built 1930–32

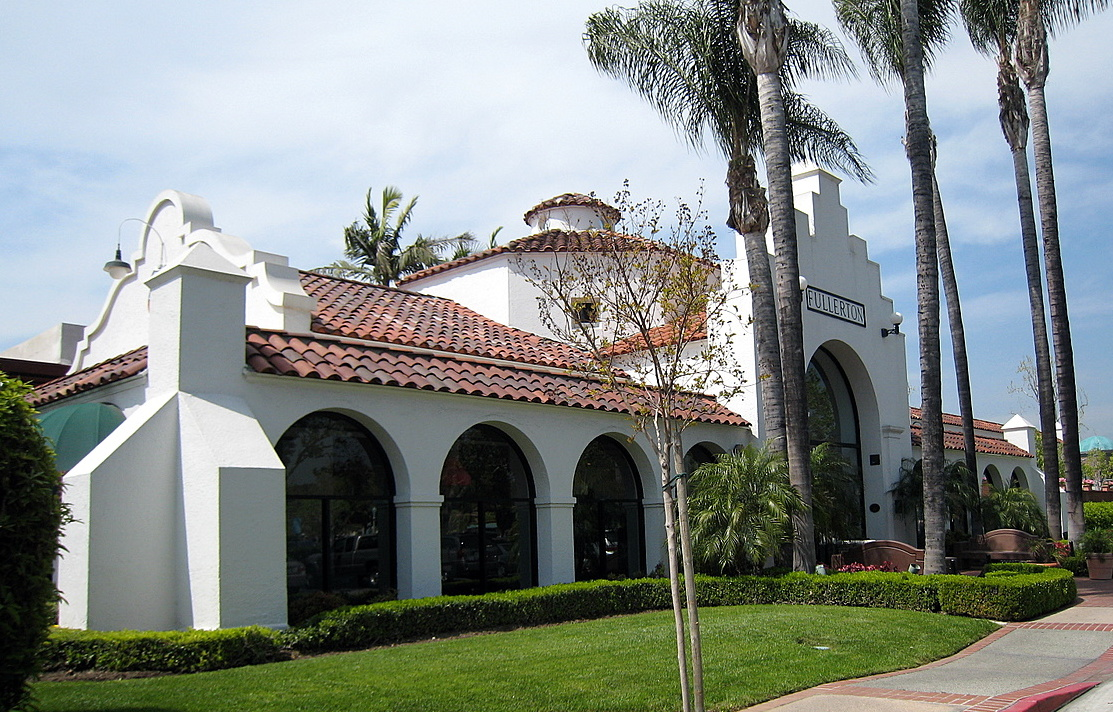
Union Pacific depot, built 1923

Drilling for petroleum began in 1880 with the discovery of the Brea-Olinda Oil Field and fueled the first real boom, peaking in the 1920s. Construction reflected the vogue for Spanish Colonial Revival and Italian Renaissance–inspired architecture, as in the historic Fox Fullerton Theatre (erected 1925); the Muckenthaler House, designed by Frank K. Benchley (erected 1924); and the city's chief landmark, the Plummer Auditorium and clock tower (erected 1930). Fullerton College was established at its present location at Chapman Avenue and Lemon Street in 1913. Meanwhile, the city banned all overnight street parking in 1924 – a law enforced to the present day, unless an area is specifically exempted.

In 1943, the Alex Bernal residence became the site of one of the first successful lawsuits against household covenant laws in the country after Alex and Esther Bernal purchased a home in a Fullerton neighborhood that barred purchases from "Mexicans." After a home invasion that resulted in their belongings being thrown into the street and a petition signed by fifty neighborhood residents to have the Bernal's removed from the neighborhood, a lawsuit was issued against the Bernals on the basis that their presence caused "irreparable injury" to the neighborhood that could lead to "coming in contact with said other races, including Mexicans, in a social and neighborhood manner." Lawyer David C. Marcus represented the Bernals in Doss vs. Bernal and won the case, which received national attention.

In 1949, Leo Fender developed and refined the world's first commercially successful solid-body electric guitar, the Fender Telecaster.

=== Postwar suburbanization ===
Although Fullerton, like other Southern California cities, had experienced an expansion of population due to housing development, this increased by an order of magnitude during the post-war years. Fullerton's population soared after World War II as American veterans migrated to the region, bought housing in developments which consumed the area's farmland, and in particular, after the construction of Interstate 5 and development in neighboring Anaheim.

To serve the growing population, the California State Legislature authorized Orange County State College in 1957, which began operating out of Fullerton high schools in 1959. In 1963, it moved to its present campus on State College Boulevard, and later, after several name changes, was finally redesignated California State University, Fullerton. The Fullerton Arboretum, a 26-acre (105,000 m^{2}) botanical garden, opened in 1979.

Manufacturing growth leveled off as ever-soaring property prices, increasing environmental regulation, traffic, and other pressures increased. By the late 20th century, the city had lost much of its rural character in favor of suburban housing tracts and shopping centers.

In the 1980s, Fullerton hosted a community of Punk and LGBTQ youth in the former Black Hole Apartments.

=== Recent history ===
In the 1990s, the downtown commercial district had become economically depressed and was known mainly for being an area of sleepy antique stores and small shops. A symbol of downtown's problems was the Fox Theatre, a local landmark which had fallen into disrepair partially due to a fire. As of November 2004, a fundraising drive had accumulated sufficient funds to buy the theater, but not yet enough money to restore it. By 2006, restoration was started. As of 2024 these renovations were still ongoing.

During this same period, downtown Fullerton (DTF), especially in the south of Commonwealth area (SOCO), has become more of a busy entertainment district, described by the OC Weekly as "Bourbon Street West." In less than five years, some 30 businesses that sell alcohol have opened, making the downtown area much more active at night. In 2008, City Manager Chris Meyer called together department heads and the finance department and reported to the city council that the Restaurant Overlay District (established December 2002) was costing the city $935,000 over and above the sales taxes collected.

The 293-acre (1.19 km^{2}) Hughes Aircraft Company's Ground Systems Group campus in western Fullerton was redeveloped into a new residential and commercial district called Amerige Heights, between 2001 and 2004.

== Geography ==
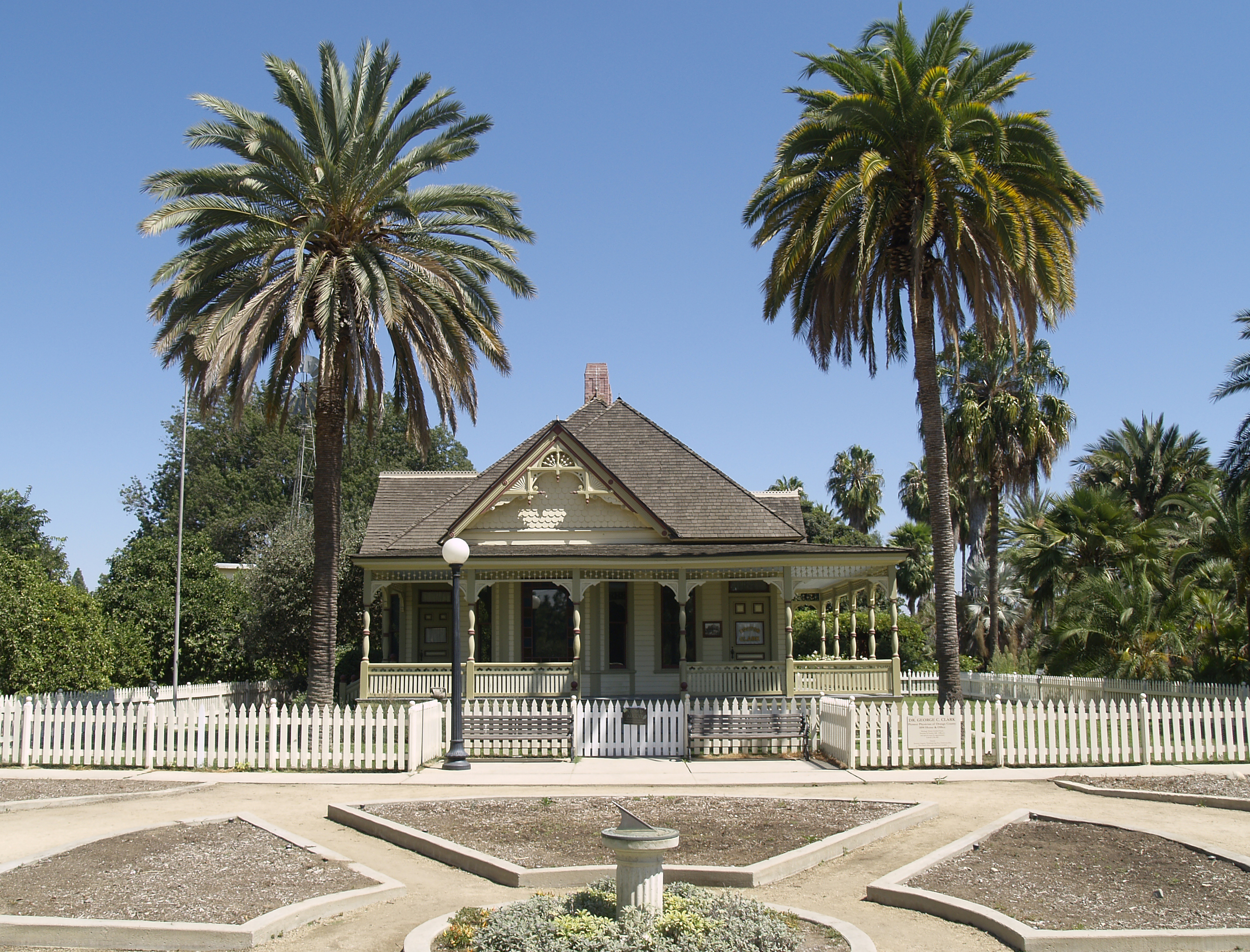
Fullerton Arboretum

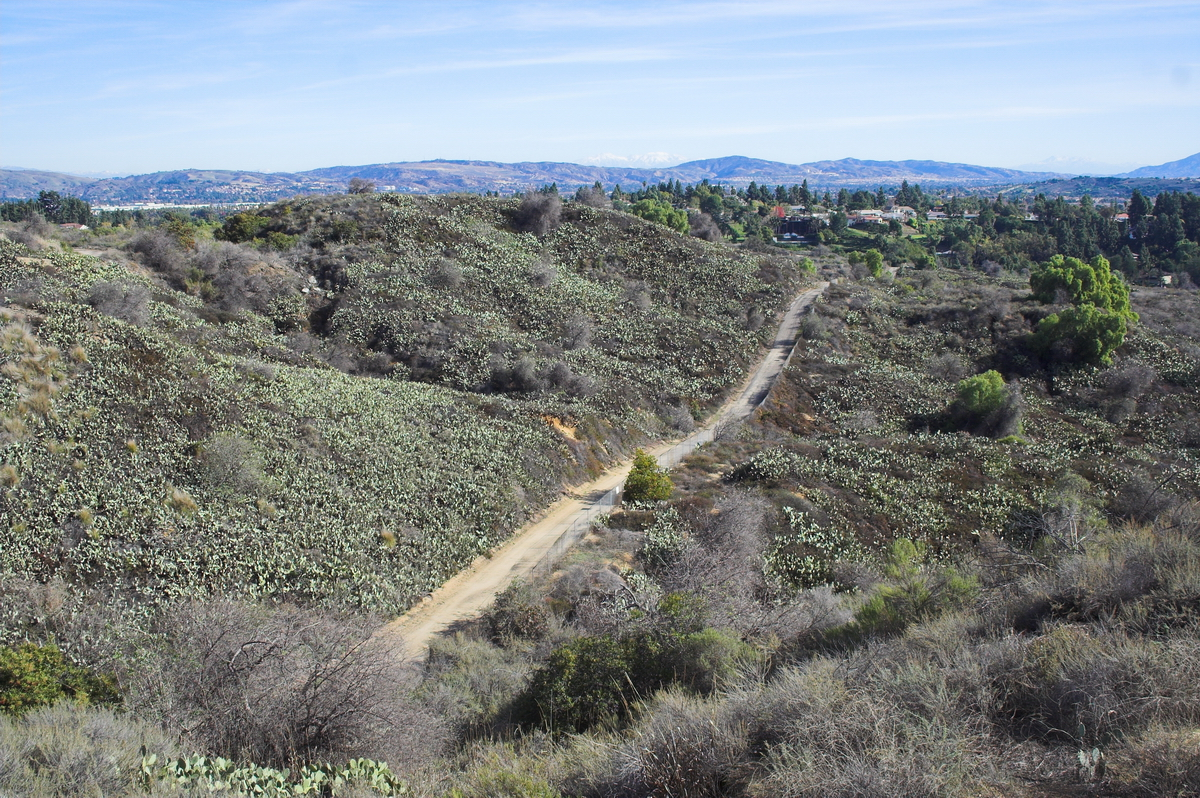
West Coyote Hills

Fullerton is located approximately 25 miles (40 km) southeast of downtown Los Angeles, and approximately 11 miles (18 km) north-northwest of Santa Ana, the county seat. The city lies approximately 11 miles (18 km) northeast of the Pacific Ocean by straight-line distance.

According to the United States Census Bureau, the city has a total area of 22.4 square miles (58 km^{2}), of which 22.4 square miles (58 km^{2}) is land and 0.01 square miles (0.026 km^{2}), comprising 0.05%, is water.

West Coyote Hills is a ridge in northern Fullerton, including 510 acres (206 ha) owned by Pacific Coast Homes (a land development division of the Chevron Corporation) that is the largest remaining tract of undeveloped land in north Orange County.

=== Climate ===
According to the Köppen Climate Classification system, Fullerton has a hot-summer Mediterranean climate, abbreviated Csa on climate maps.

Climate data for Fullerton, California (Fullerton Municipal Airport) (1991–2020 normals, extremes 1998–present)
Month	Jan	Feb	Mar	Apr	May	Jun	Jul	Aug	Sep	Oct	Nov	Dec	Year
Record high °F (°C)	94 (34)	94 (34)	97 (36)	102 (39)	104 (40)	109 (43)	116 (47)	107 (42)	113 (45)	107 (42)	99 (37)	87 (31)	116 (47)
Mean maximum °F (°C)	84.9 (29.4)	86.4 (30.2)	89.5 (31.9)	92.9 (33.8)	93.3 (34.1)	94.8 (34.9)	98.1 (36.7)	99.9 (37.7)	104.3 (40.2)	99.6 (37.6)	93.8 (34.3)	82.6 (28.1)	106.9 (41.6)
Mean daily maximum °F (°C)	68.8 (20.4)	69.0 (20.6)	71.0 (21.7)	74.2 (23.4)	75.7 (24.3)	79.0 (26.1)	84.4 (29.1)	86.7 (30.4)	85.4 (29.7)	80.3 (26.8)	74.0 (23.3)	68.1 (20.1)	76.4 (24.7)
Daily mean °F (°C)	57.6 (14.2)	58.6 (14.8)	61.2 (16.2)	64.0 (17.8)	66.9 (19.4)	70.8 (21.6)	75.2 (24.0)	76.5 (24.7)	75.0 (23.9)	69.3 (20.7)	62.4 (16.9)	56.9 (13.8)	66.2 (19.0)
Mean daily minimum °F (°C)	46.4 (8.0)	48.3 (9.1)	51.5 (10.8)	53.8 (12.1)	58.1 (14.5)	62.6 (17.0)	66.1 (18.9)	66.4 (19.1)	64.6 (18.1)	58.3 (14.6)	50.7 (10.4)	45.6 (7.6)	56.0 (13.3)
Mean minimum °F (°C)	38.0 (3.3)	38.5 (3.6)	42.5 (5.8)	46.9 (8.3)	52.6 (11.4)	57.8 (14.3)	61.7 (16.5)	62.1 (16.7)	58.1 (14.5)	50.9 (10.5)	43.0 (6.1)	35.9 (2.2)	34.8 (1.6)
Record low °F (°C)	28 (−2)	35 (2)	36 (2)	39 (4)	46 (8)	52 (11)	58 (14)	56 (13)	54 (12)	45 (7)	34 (1)	31 (−1)	28 (−2)
Average precipitation inches (mm)	2.85 (72)	3.02 (77)	1.74 (44)	0.59 (15)	0.30 (7.6)	0.08 (2.0)	0.02 (0.51)	0.02 (0.51)	0.14 (3.6)	0.50 (13)	0.74 (19)	1.86 (47)	11.86 (301)
Average precipitation days (≥ 0.01 in)	5.2	6.8	5.3	3.5	1.8	0.5	0.3	0.2	0.8	3.0	4.6	6.3	38.3
Source: NOAA (mean maxima/minima 2006–2020)

== Demographics ==
Historical population
Census	Pop.	Note	%±
1910	1,725		—
1920	4,415		155.9%
1930	10,860		146.0%
1940	10,442		−3.8%
1950	13,958		33.7%
1960	56,180		302.5%
1970	85,987		53.1%
1980	102,246		18.9%
1990	114,144		11.6%
2000	126,003		10.4%
2010	135,161		7.3%
2020	143,617		6.3%
U.S. Decennial Census; 1860–1870 1880–1890; 1900 1910 1920; 1930 1940 1950; 1960 1970 1980; 1990 2000 2010; 2020

Fullerton first appeared as a city in the 1910 U.S. census. Prior to that, the area was part of unincorporated Fullerton Township (pop 1,697 in 1900).

=== 2020 ===
Fullerton, California – Racial and ethnic composition Note: the US Census treats Hispanic/Latino as an ethnic category. This table excludes Latinos from the racial categories and assigns them to a separate category. Hispanics/Latinos may be of any race.
Race / ethnicity (NH = Non-Hispanic)	Pop 1980	Pop 1990	Pop 2000	Pop 2010	Pop 2020	% 1980	% 1990	% 2000	% 2010	% 2020
White alone (NH)	81,011	73,408	61,420	51,656	42,150	81.61%	64.31%	48.74%	38.22%	29.35%
Black or African American alone (NH)	1,483	2,348	2,675	2,791	2,972	1.49%	2.06%	2.12%	2.06%	2.07%
Native American or Alaska Native alone (NH)	723	369	404	251	289	0.73%	0.32%	0.32%	0.19%	0.20%
Asian alone (NH)	4,728	13,552	20,130	30,486	37,913	4.76%	11.87%	15.98%	22.56%	26.40%
Native Hawaiian or Pacific Islander alone (NH)	4,728	13,552	251	270	266	4.76%	11.87%	0.20%	0.20%	0.19%
Other race alone (NH)	245	163	237	243	691	0.25%	0.14%	0.19%	0.18%	0.48%
Mixed race or Multiracial (NH)	x	x	2,872	2,963	5,111	x	x	2.28%	2.19%	3.56%
Hispanic or Latino (any race)	13,844	24,304	38,014	46,501	54,225	13.95%	21.29%	30.17%	34.40%	37.76%
Total	99,263	114,144	126,003	135,161	143,617	100.00%	100.00%	100.00%	100.00%	100.00%

The 2020 United States census reported that Fullerton had a population of 143,617. The population density was 6,406.0 inhabitants per square mile (2,473.4/km^{2}). The racial makeup of Fullerton was 36.3% White, 2.3% African American, 1.3% Native American, 26.7% Asian, 0.2% Pacific Islander, 18.2% from other races, and 14.9% from two or more races. Hispanic or Latino of any race were 37.8% of the population.

The census reported that 97.5% of the population lived in households, 2.1% lived in non-institutionalized group quarters, and 0.4% were institutionalized.

There were 48,412 households, out of which 32.8% included children under the age of 18, 50.1% were married-couple households, 6.6% were cohabiting couple households, 25.7% had a female householder with no partner present, and 17.6% had a male householder with no partner present. 20.4% of households were one person, and 8.2% were one person aged 65 or older. The average household size was 2.89. There were 33,984 families (70.2% of all households).

The age distribution was 20.5% under the age of 18, 12.3% aged 18 to 24, 27.8% aged 25 to 44, 25.1% aged 45 to 64, and 14.3% who were 65 years of age or older. The median age was 36.7 years. For every 100 females, there were 95.6 males.

There were 50,411 housing units at an average density of 2,248.6 units per square mile (868.2 units/km^{2}), of which 48,412 (96.0%) were occupied. Of these, 50.1% were owner-occupied, and 49.9% were occupied by renters.

In 2023, the US Census Bureau estimated that 28.9% of the population were foreign-born. Of all people aged 5 or older, 53.6% spoke only English at home, 25.2% spoke Spanish, 3.7% spoke other Indo-European languages, 16.5% spoke Asian or Pacific Islander languages, and 0.9% spoke other languages. Of those aged 25 or older, 88.3% were high school graduates and 43.6% had a bachelor's degree.

The median household income was $104,219, and the per capita income was $48,061. About 8.0% of families and 12.2% of the population were below the poverty line.

=== 2010 ===
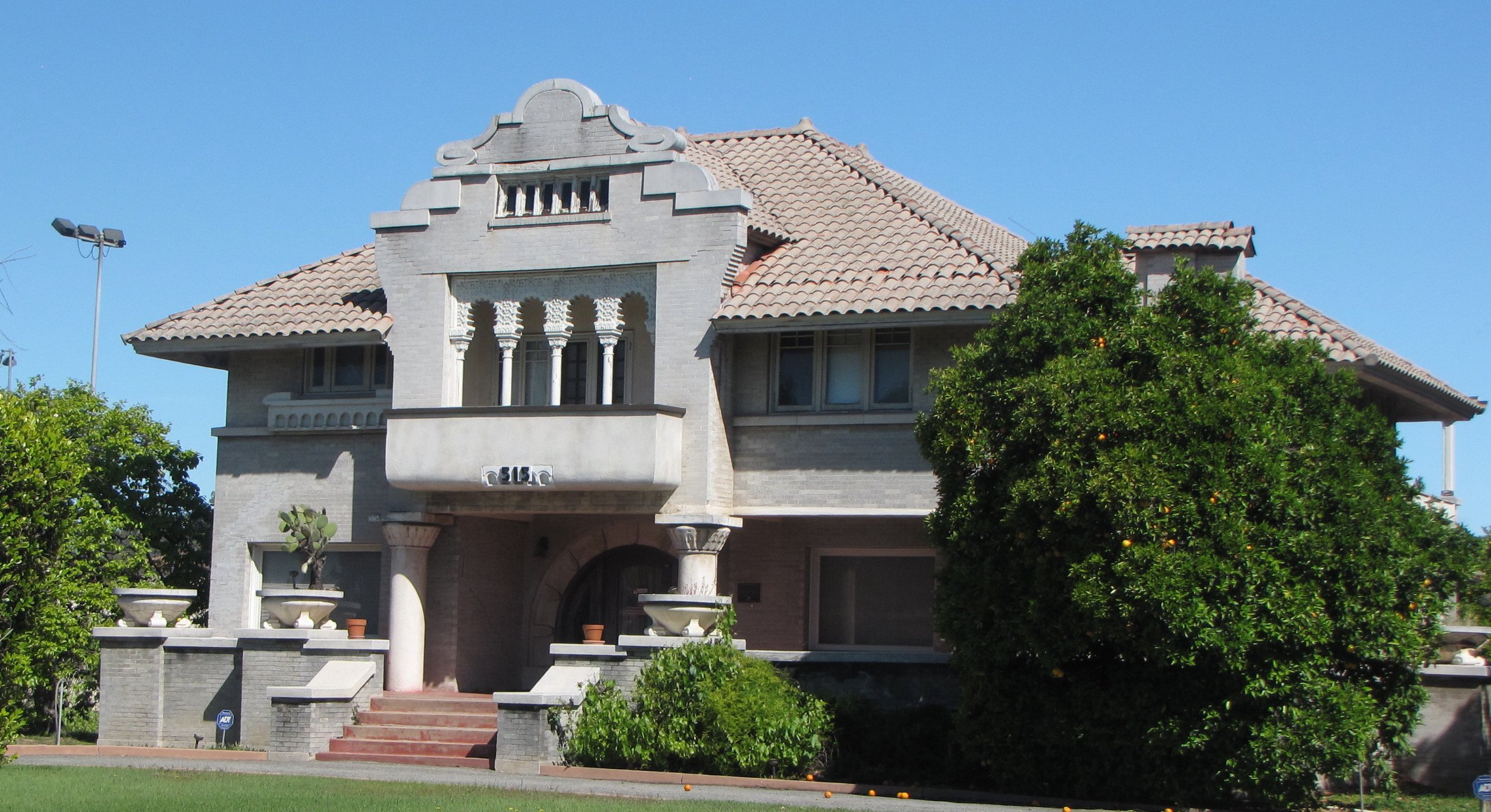
The Mission Revival–style Hetebrink House, built in 1912, is a National Historic Site

The 2010 United States census reported that Fullerton had a population of 135,161. The population density was 6,043.9 inhabitants per square mile (2,333.6/km^{2}). The racial makeup of Fullerton was 72,845 (53.9%) White, 3,138 (2.3%) African American, 842 (0.6%) Native American, 30,788 (22.8%) Asian, 321 (0.2%) Pacific Islander, 21,439 (15.9%) from other races, and 5,788 (4.3%) from two or more races. Hispanic or Latino of any race were 46,501 persons (34.4%). Non-Hispanic Whites were 38.2% of the population, down from 79.0% in 1980.

The Census reported that 132,084 people (97.7% of the population) lived in households, 2,318 (1.7%) lived in non-institutionalized group quarters, and 759 (0.6%) were institutionalized.

There were 45,391 households, out of which 16,155 (35.6%) had children under the age of 18 living in them, 23,240 (51.2%) were opposite-sex married couples living together, 5,502 (12.1%) had a female householder with no husband present, 2,505 (5.5%) had a male householder with no wife present. There were 2,366 (5.2%) unmarried opposite-sex partnerships, and 290 (0.6%) same-sex married couples or partnerships. 9,771 households (21.5%) were made up of individuals, and 3,342 (7.4%) had someone living alone who was 65 years of age or older. The average household size was 2.91. There were 31,247 families (68.8% of all households); the average family size was 3.43.

The population was spread out, with 31,558 people (23.3%) under the age of 18, 17,522 people (13.0%) aged 18 to 24, 37,764 people (27.9%) aged 25 to 44, 32,465 people (24.0%) aged 45 to 64, and 15,852 people (11.7%) who were 65 years of age or older. The median age was 34.8 years. For every 100 females, there were 96.6 males. For every 100 females age 18 and over, there were 94.4 males.

There were 47,869 housing units at an average density of 2,140.5 per square mile (826.5/km^{2}), of which 24,600 (54.2%) were owner-occupied, and 20,791 (45.8%) were occupied by renters. The homeowner vacancy rate was 1.1%; the rental vacancy rate was 7.0%. 73,127 people (54.1% of the population) lived in owner-occupied housing units and 58,957 people (43.6%) lived in rental housing units.

According to the 2010 United States census, Fullerton had a median household income of $67,617, with 14.6% of the population living below the federal poverty line.

=== Crime ===
2023 Uniform Crime Report data
	Aggravated Assault	Homicide	Rape	Robbery	Burglary	Larceny Theft	Motor Vehicle Theft	Arson
Fullerton	348	0	68	110	486	2,053	487	13

== Economy ==
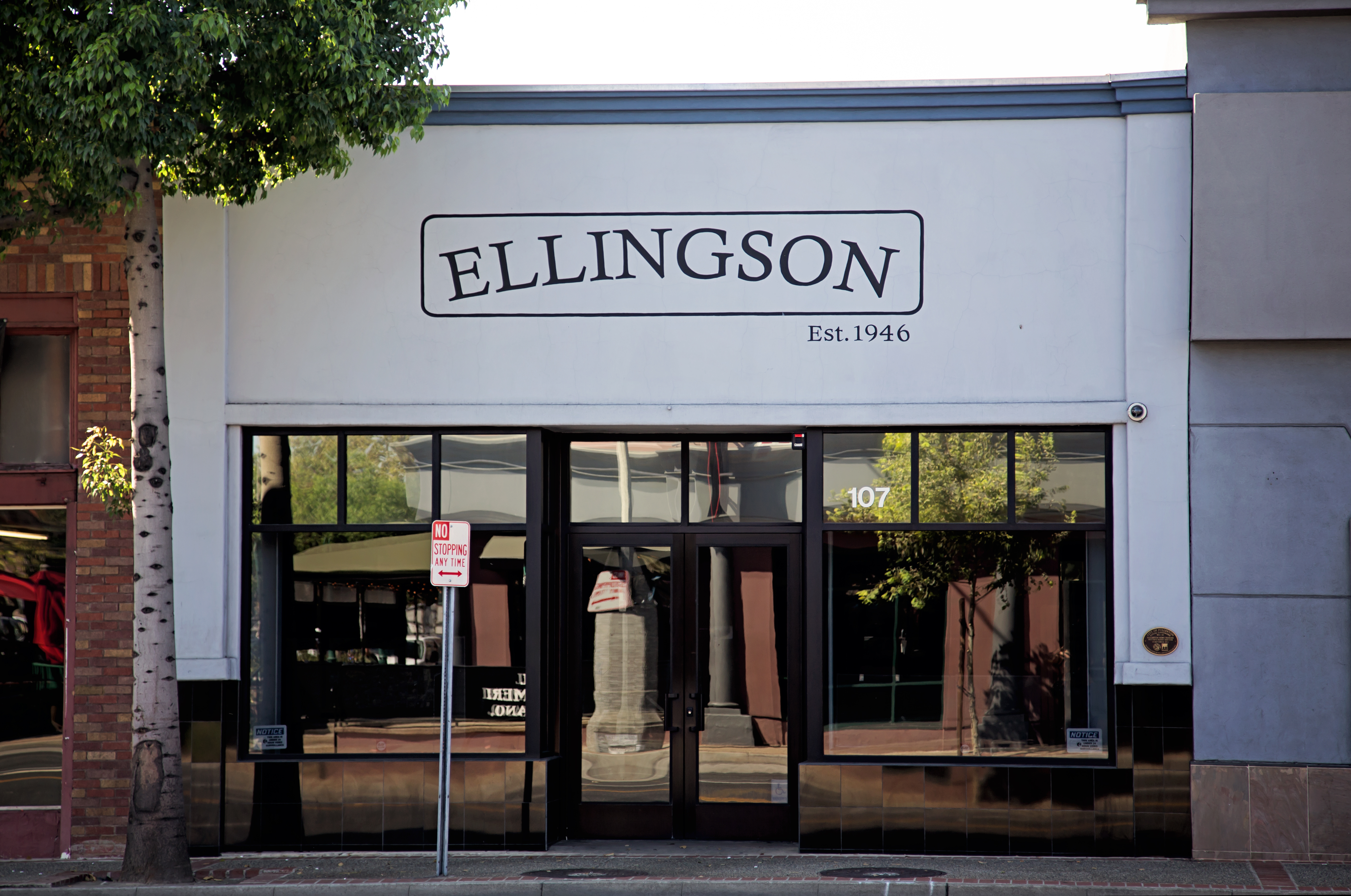
Shops in downtown Fullerton

According to the city's 2024 Comprehensive Annual Financial Report, the top employers in the city are:

#	Employer	# of employees
1	California State University, Fullerton	3,000
2	St. Jude Medical Center	1,797
3	Raytheon	1,200
4	Fullerton College	1,100
5	City of Fullerton	710
6	Chuze Fitness	700
7	AJ Kirkwood & Associates, Inc.	600
8	Albertsons Regional Corporate	400
9	Morningside of Fullerton	350
10	RPM Transportation	300

== Arts and culture ==
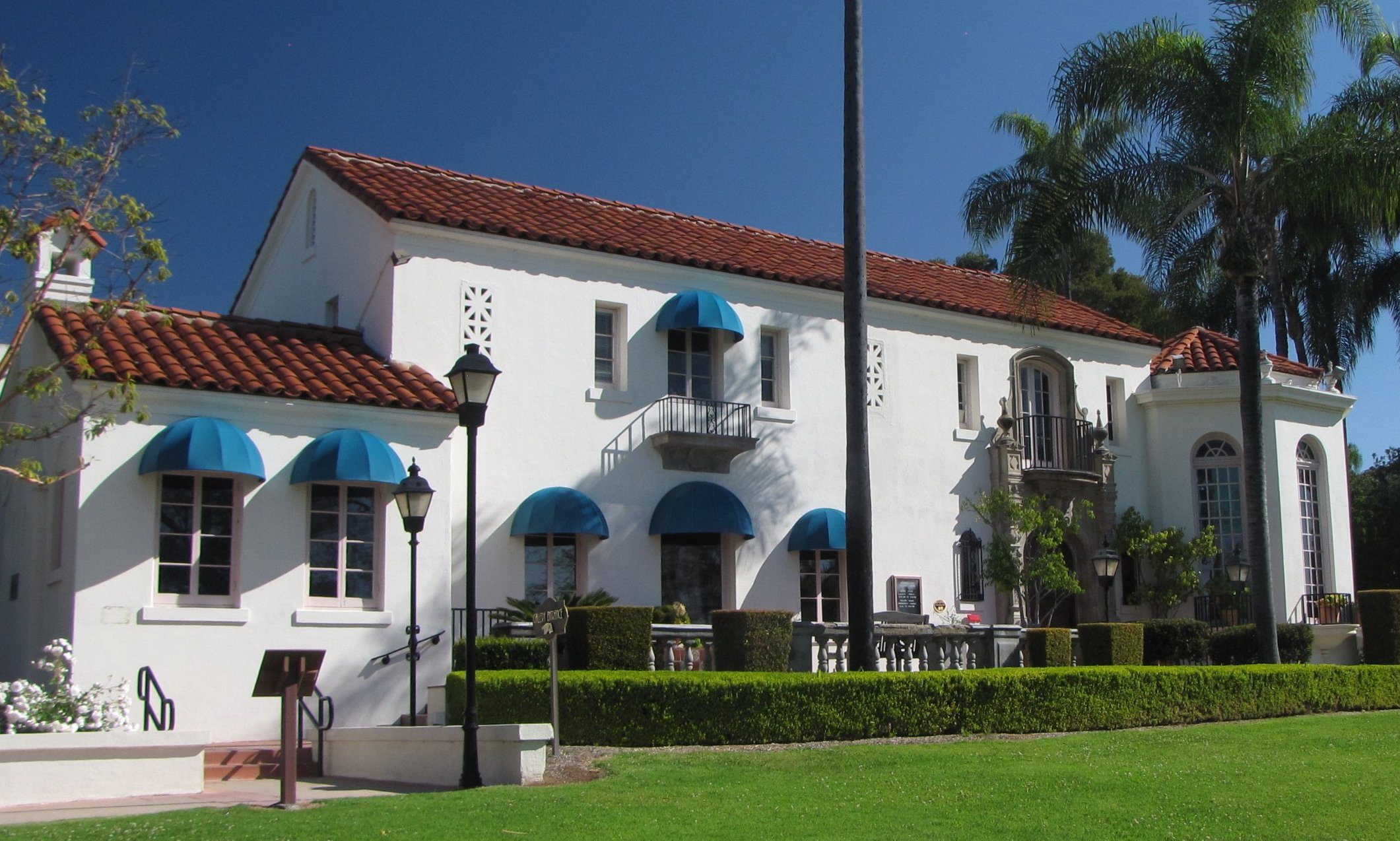
Muckenthaler Cultural Center

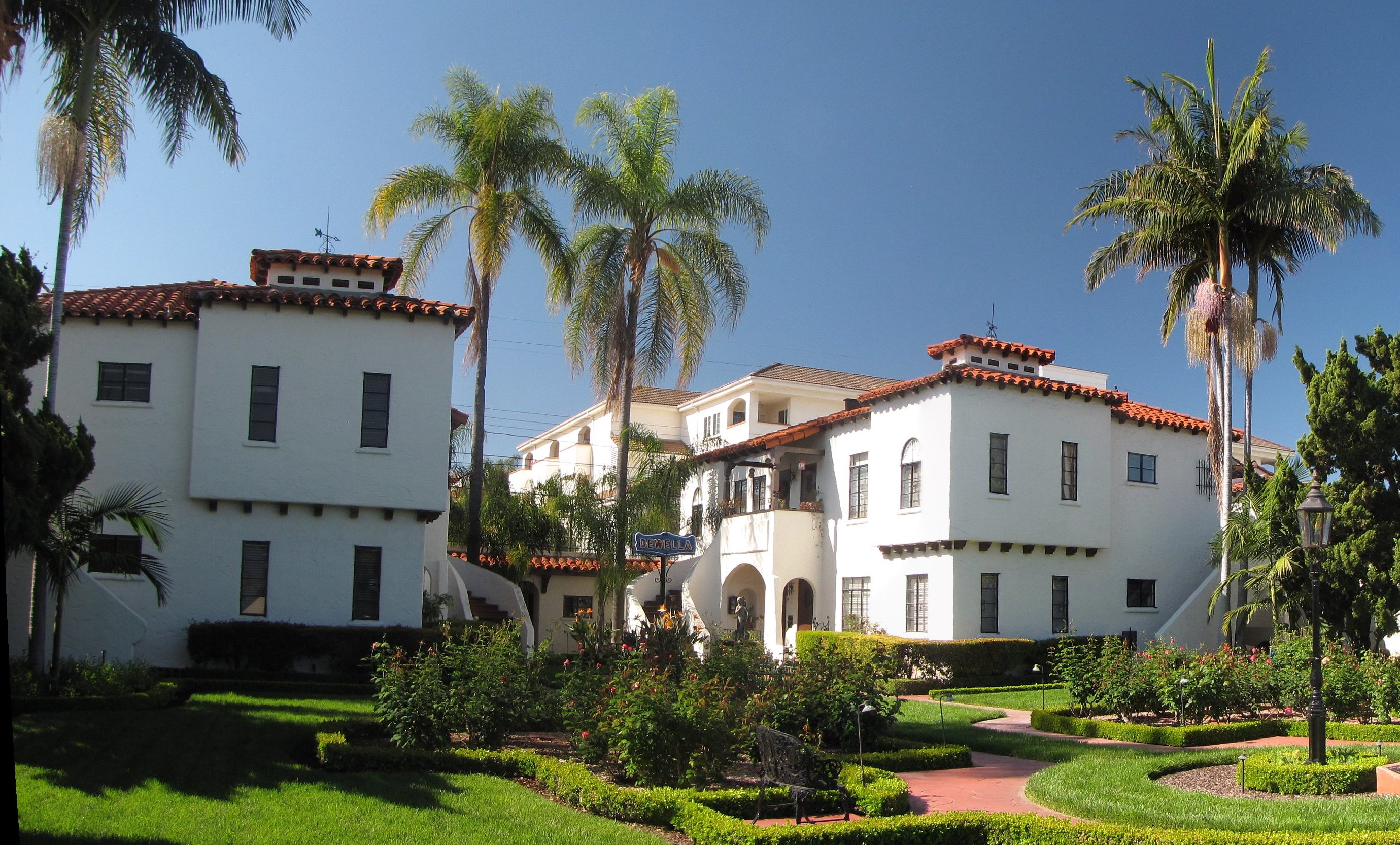
The Dewella complex is on the National Register of Historic Places.

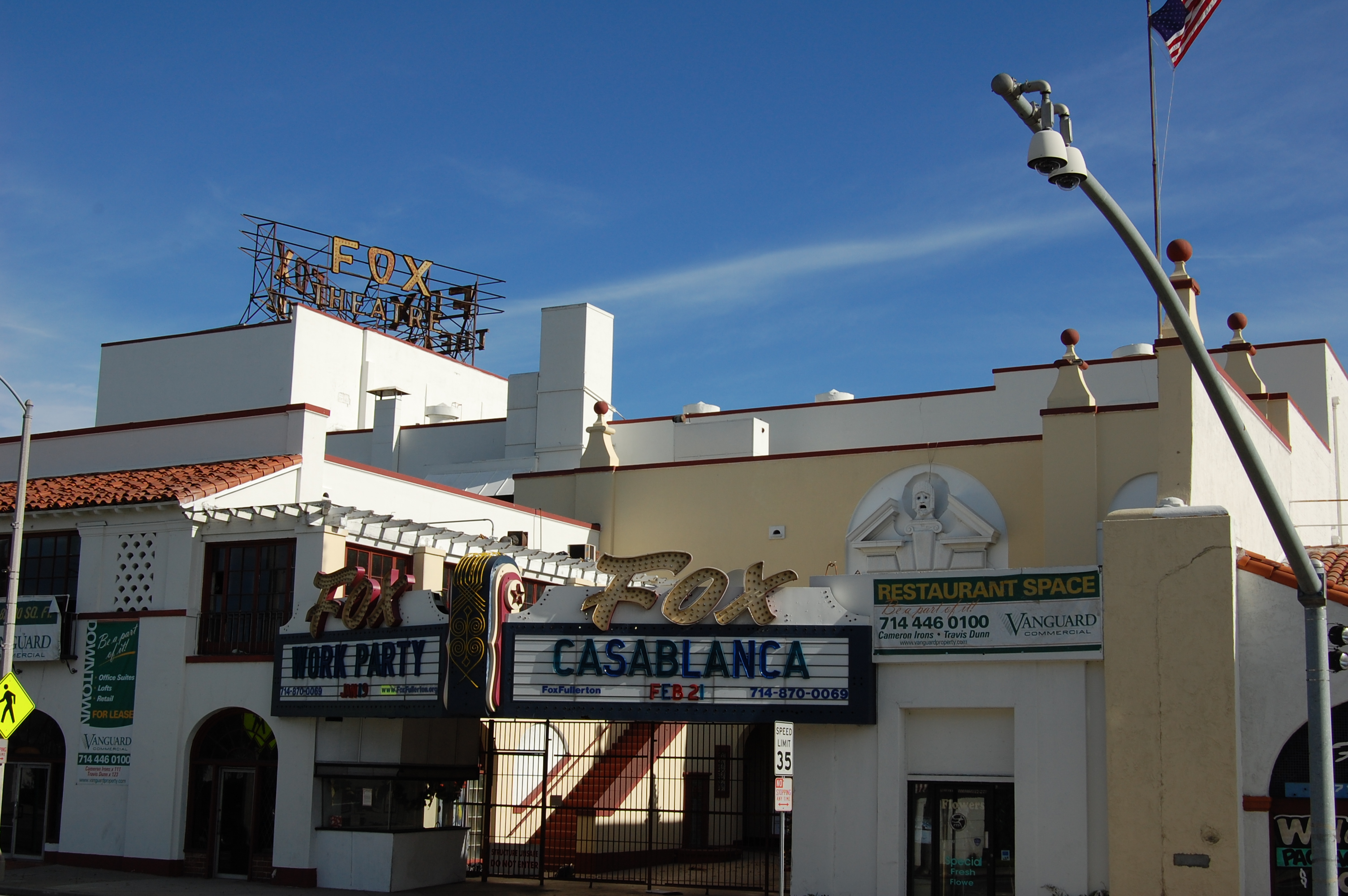
Fox Theatre, built in 1925

=== Culture ===
Fullerton is home to a music scene. In the early 1990s, the Historic Ice House, built in 1902 and restored in 1989 featured several venues showcasing bands such as Room to Roam and Trip the Spring. It was a center for the Orange County hardcore punk music scene, producing acts such as The Adolescents, Agent Orange, Social Distortion, D.I., the "fathers of hardcore punk" The Middle Class, Gwen Stefani, lead vocalist of the alternative rock group No Doubt, was a student at CSUF and the group performed there regularly. The Ice House was subsequently forced to close for special events. Years later, other popular groups and musicians from the area include Lit, 80s synthpop acts Berlin and Stacey Q, and Mike Ness. The popular singer-songwriter Jackson Browne attended Sunny Hills High School in the city. Singer-songwriter Tim Buckley also attended Fullerton College and dropped out after only a few weeks to focus on his music career. Fullerton is also home to one of the signature cities in the Make Music Day Alliance. Make Music Day is a global annual music celebration occurring on the summer solstice (June 21) each year in more than 1,000 cities in 120 countries across the globe. Starting in 2015, The Day of Music Fullerton began as a grass roots initiative by a team of volunteers to create a unique and free music festival in alliance with the internationally renowned Fête de la Musique. Each year on June 21 Fullerton comes alive from morning to night with musicians of all ages and musical persuasions performing in musical venues, shops, bars, restaurants, plazas, churches, parks and parking lots. From high school bands to established musicians/bands, Day of Music Fullerton is open to anyone who wants to perform and enjoyed by everyone who wants to attend for free. Since its inception, Day of Music Fullerton has grown into a popular and critical success, hosting over 150 performances in more than 40 venues around the city, including the Museum Plaza, Historic Fox Theatre, Hillcrest Park, Villa del Sol, and The Muckenthaler Cultural Center, among others.

Contributing greatly to Fullerton's musical heritage was the Fender Musical Instruments Corporation, whose products such as the Stratocaster and Telecaster electric guitars, Precision Bass bass guitar, and Twin Reverb guitar amplifier revolutionized the music business and contributed greatly to the development of rock and roll. Leo Fender sold the company to CBS in 1965; production continued in the Fullerton plant until 1985, when the company was sold to a group of private investors. In 1980, Leo Fender and his original partner George Fullerton (relation to the Fullerton founder of the same name unknown) reunited and started a new company, G&L (George and Leo) Guitars, which are built in what had been Leo Fender's CLF Research factory in Fullerton.

The Muckenthaler Cultural Center on Malvern Avenue near Euclid Avenue houses art galleries and a theater group. The former estate of the Muckenthaler family, it was donated to the city by Harold Muckenthaler in 1965. Fullerton Friends of Music, the oldest chamber music society in Orange County, perform five concerts a year at Sunny Hills Performing Arts Center, a notable classical concert venue in the county.

Fullerton is home to the Fullerton Public Library. The Main Library is located on Commonwealth Avenue in Downtown Fullerton and adjacent to the City Hall. Formerly there was a branch library, called the Hunt Branch on Basque Avenue. The Hunt Branch was closed in 2013

There are several storefront theaters, including the Maverick Theater and Stages Theater. The Maverick Theatre is the host for the "World Famous Skipper Stand Up Show." Held six times a year, The Skipper Stand Up Show has, since 2006, showcased former and current skippers from Disneyland's famous attraction, the Jungle Cruise.

== Sports ==
The Orange County Flyers (formerly Fullerton Flyers) of the Golden Baseball League disbanded in 2012. The team played at Goodwin Field, home field of the Cal State Fullerton Titans.

== Parks and recreation ==
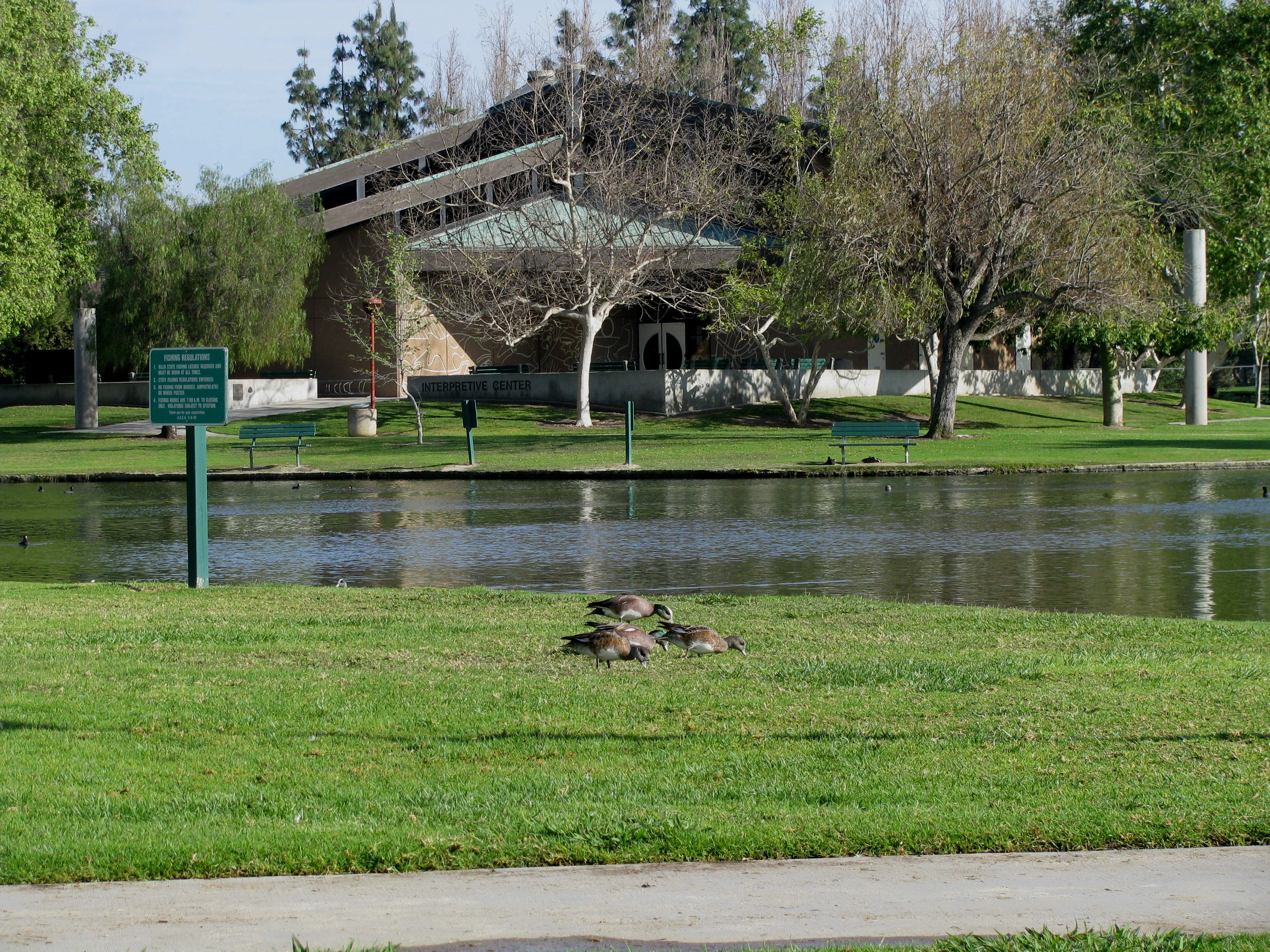
Ralph B. Clark Regional Park

Fullerton contains more than 50 city parks including Hillcrest Park, Chapman Park, Craig Regional Park and Ralph B. Clark Regional Park. The Fullerton Arboretum comprises 26 acres (11 ha) of sculpted gardens. Approximately 200 acres (0.81 km^{2}) of recreational land are located in the Brea Dam Recreational Area, including an equestrian center and trails, two golf courses, a sports complex and the Janet Evans swim Complex.

== Government ==
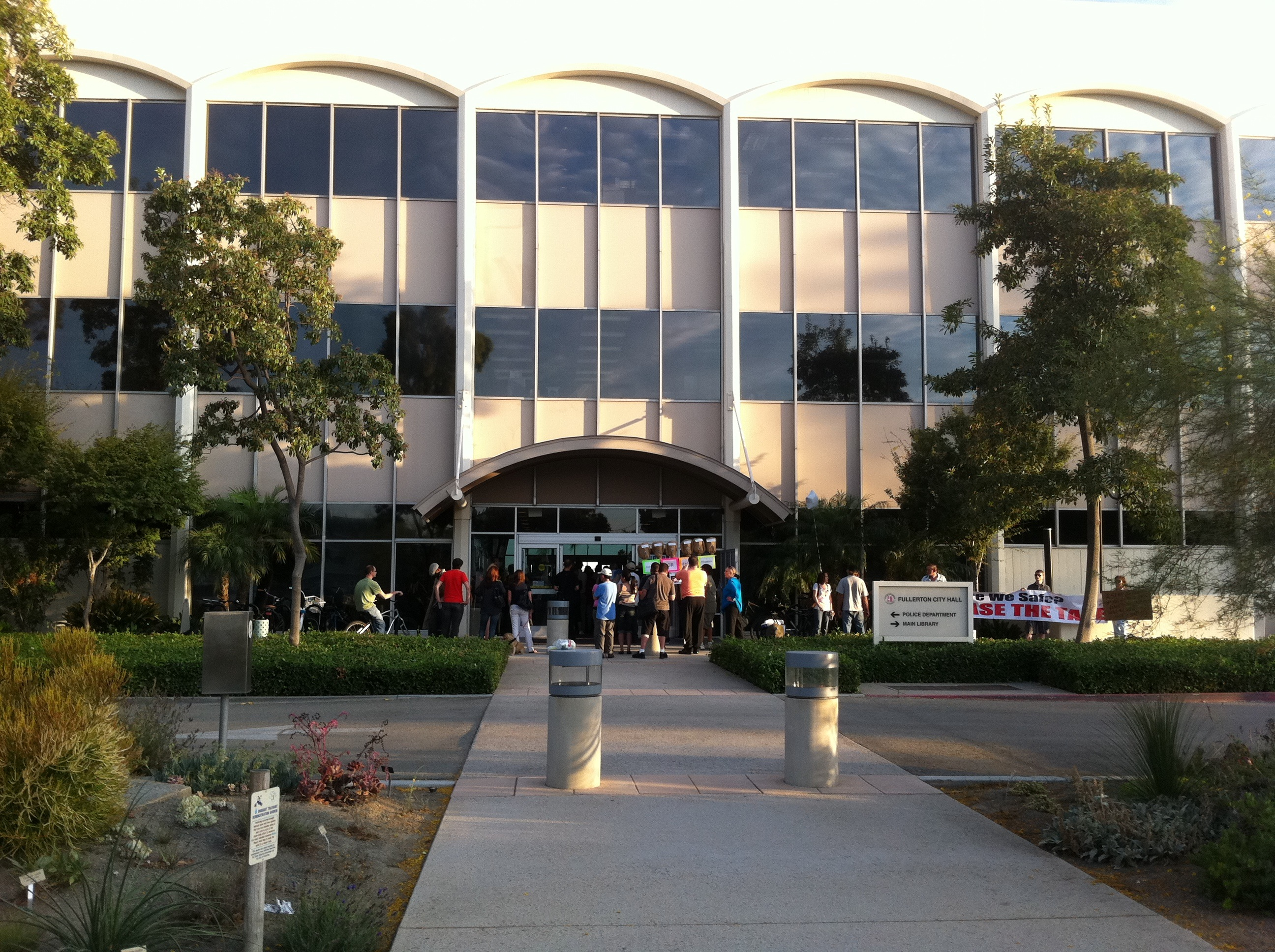
Fullerton City Hall

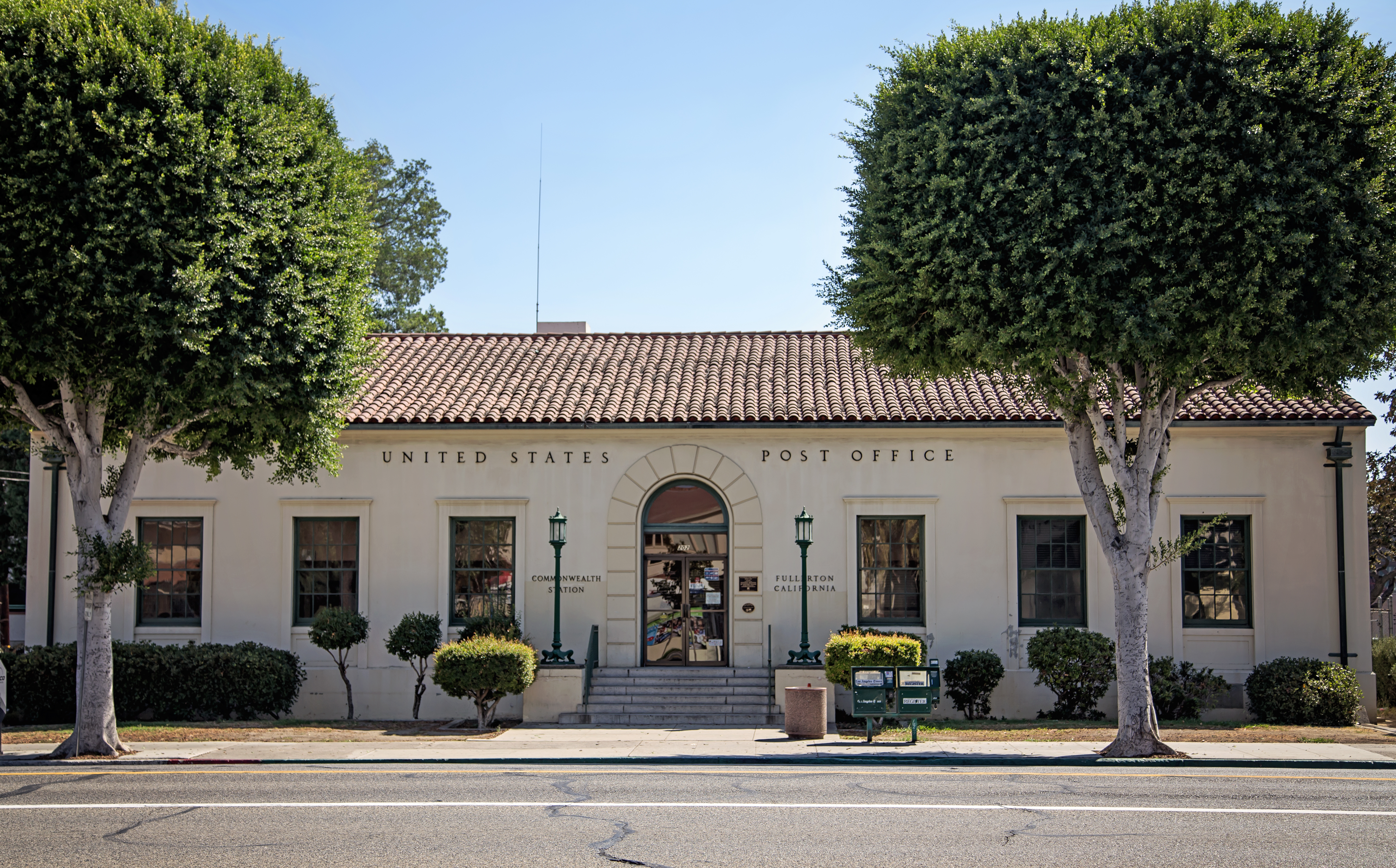
Fullerton Post Office, built in 1939

Fullerton is a General-law municipality with a council-manager government system. Legislative authority is vested in a city council of five non-partisan members who serve four-year staggered terms, who elect a chair who serves as mayor. Elections are held every two years and are consolidated with the statewide general elections held in November of even numbered years. The city manager is responsible for day-to-day operations. Prior to 2016, all council seats were elected at large. In 2016 voters passed Measure II which changed at large representation to election for five districts. The mayor is Fred Jung.

=== Federal, state, and county representation ===
In the United States House of Representatives, Fullerton is split between California's 45th congressional district and California's 46th congressional district, which are represented by Democrat Derek Tran and Democrat Lou Correa respectively.

In the California State Senate, Fullerton is split between two districts

- California's 34th senatorial district, represented by Democrat Tom Umberg since 2018
- California's 37th senatorial district, represented by Republican Steven Choi since 2024.

In the California State Assembly, Fullerton is split between two districts

- California's 59th State Assembly district, represented by Republican Phillip Chen since 2016
- California's 67th State Assembly district, represented by Democrat Sharon Quirk-Silva since 2016

For the Orange County Board of Supervisors, Fullerton resides within the fourth district supervised by Doug Chaffee since 2025.

== Education ==
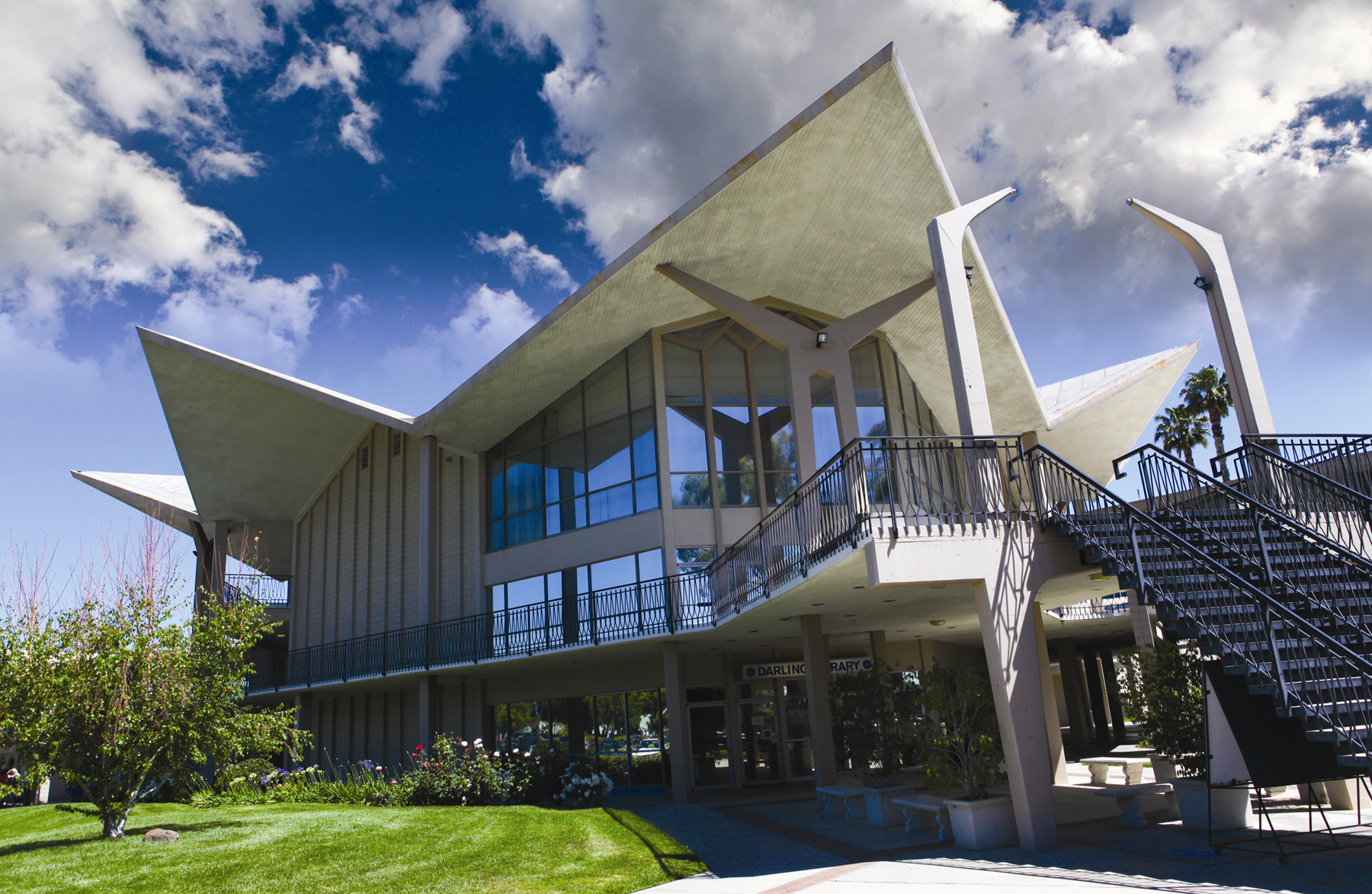
Hope International University

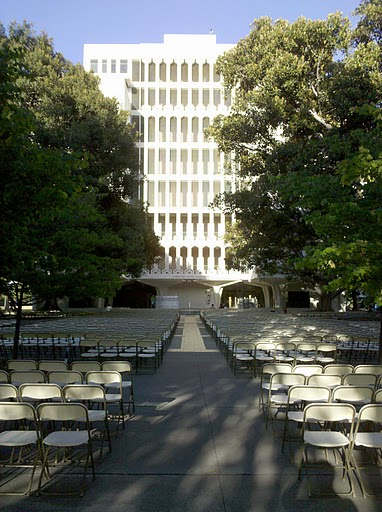
California State University, Fullerton (CSUF)

=== Public schools ===
The city of Fullerton is served by three elementary and junior high school districts, two unified school districts, and one high school exclusive school district:

The elementary school districts include:

- Fullerton School District (the vast majority of the city)
- La Habra City School District
- Buena Park School District

Areas in those three elementary school districts are also within the Fullerton Joint Union High School District. Therefore the high school district includes the vast majority of Fullerton.

Parts of Fullerton are in the following unified school districts (which cover all grade levels PK-12):

- Brea Olinda Unified School District
- Placentia-Yorba Linda Unified School District

Fullerton has four public high schools within the city limits, all part of the Fullerton Joint Union High School District:

- Sunny Hills High School.
- Fullerton Union High School. The oldest high school in Orange County, it is the home of historic Plummer Auditorium and the Academy of the Arts magnet program.
- Troy High School (which includes Troy Tech, a public magnet program).
- La Vista High School and La Sierra High School (continuation schools, adjacent to Troy)

The Fullerton district operates elementary and junior high schools in the city limits. There are three public junior high schools, enrolling grades 7–8: Ladera Vista, Nicolas, and D. Russell Parks Junior High School. Fullerton has only two public elementary K–8 schools: Beechwood and Robert C. Fisler. Fullerton has fifteen public elementary schools enrolling grades K–6: Acacia, Commonwealth, Fern Drive, Golden Hill, Hermosa Drive, Laguna Road, Maple, Orangethorpe, Pacific Drive, Raymond, Richman, Rolling Hills, Sunset Lane, Valencia Park, and Woodcrest.

=== Private schools ===
Fullerton's Catholic schools are affiliated with the Roman Catholic Diocese of Orange.

Saint Juliana Falconieri School, a K-8 school; and Rosary Academy, a girls' high school, are Fullerton.

Annunciation Catholic School, which was in Fullerton, closed on May 23, 2013.

=== Postsecondary institutions ===
- California State University, Fullerton, commonly known as Cal State Fullerton or CSUF, was first established in 1957 as Orange County State College. The twelfth member of the California State University system, it is currently composed of eight colleges, a community extended education program and several institutions and centers. The main campus is located on 236 acres (0.96 km^{2}) of former orange groves in northeast Fullerton near State Route 57 and Nutwood Avenue. As of 2019, 39,868 students were enrolled in 55 undergraduate and 55 graduate degree programs (including doctorate in education and doctor in nursing practice programs), making it the largest university in the California State University system and the second largest university in the state of California in terms of enrollment.
- Fullerton College is a two-year community college, the oldest in continuous operation in California. Part of the North Orange County Community College District, it is situated on a 63-acre (255,000 m^{2}) campus adjacent to Fullerton Union High School on Chapman Avenue and had 25,051 students enrolled as of 2019. The college offers 90 majors leading to A.A. or A.S. degrees in academic and vocational subjects, 68 programs leading to vocational certificates, and transfer programs specializing in preparing students to transfer into the California State University and University of California systems.
- Hope International University is a private Christian university
- Marshall B. Ketchum University is a health sciences university.

== Media ==
From 1921 to 1984, the Fullerton Daily News Tribune was the largest independent daily newspaper in Orange County. The Fullerton Observer is a community newspaper.

== Infrastructure ==
=== Transportation ===
==== Rail ====
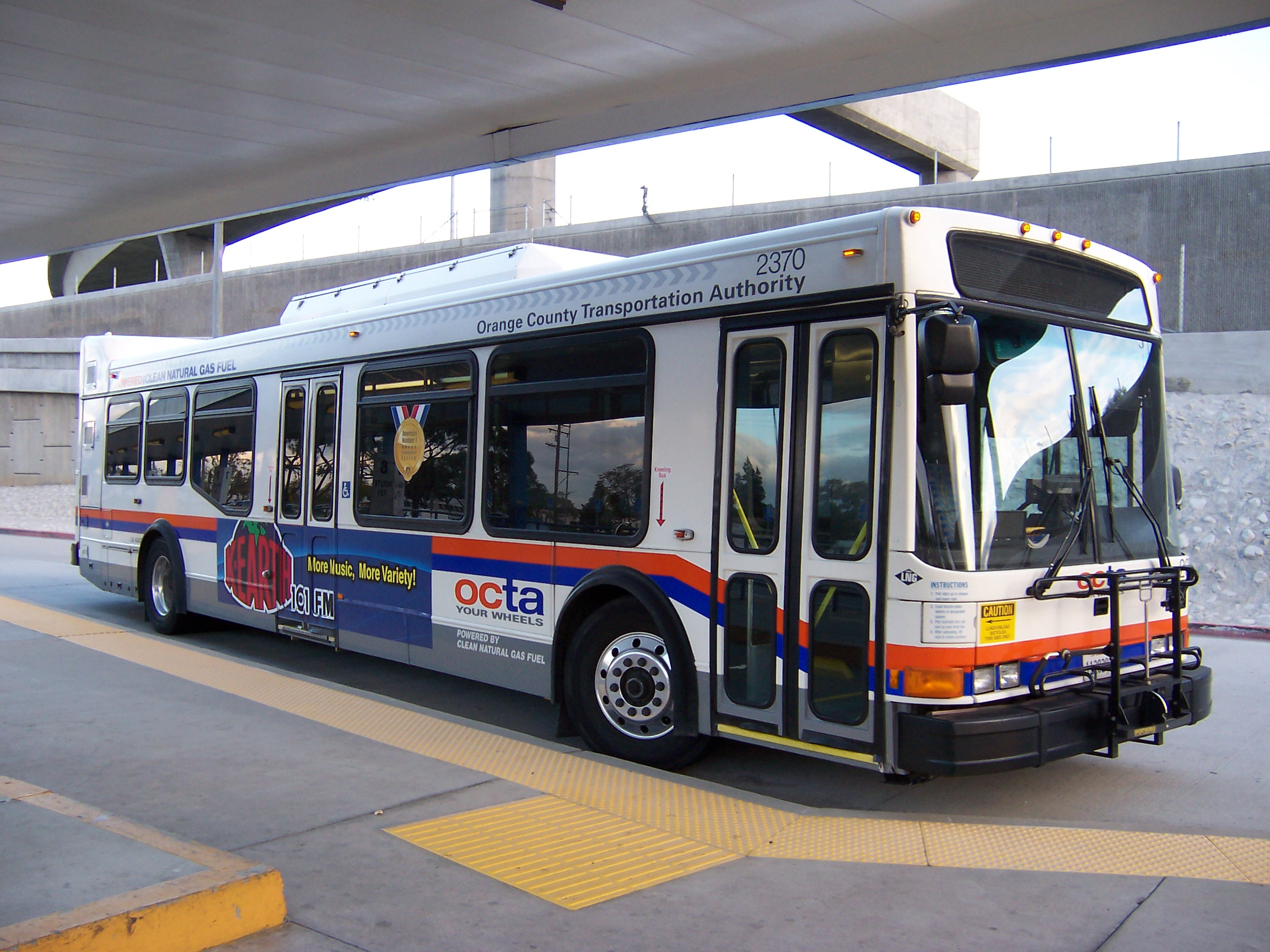
OCTA bus in Fullerton

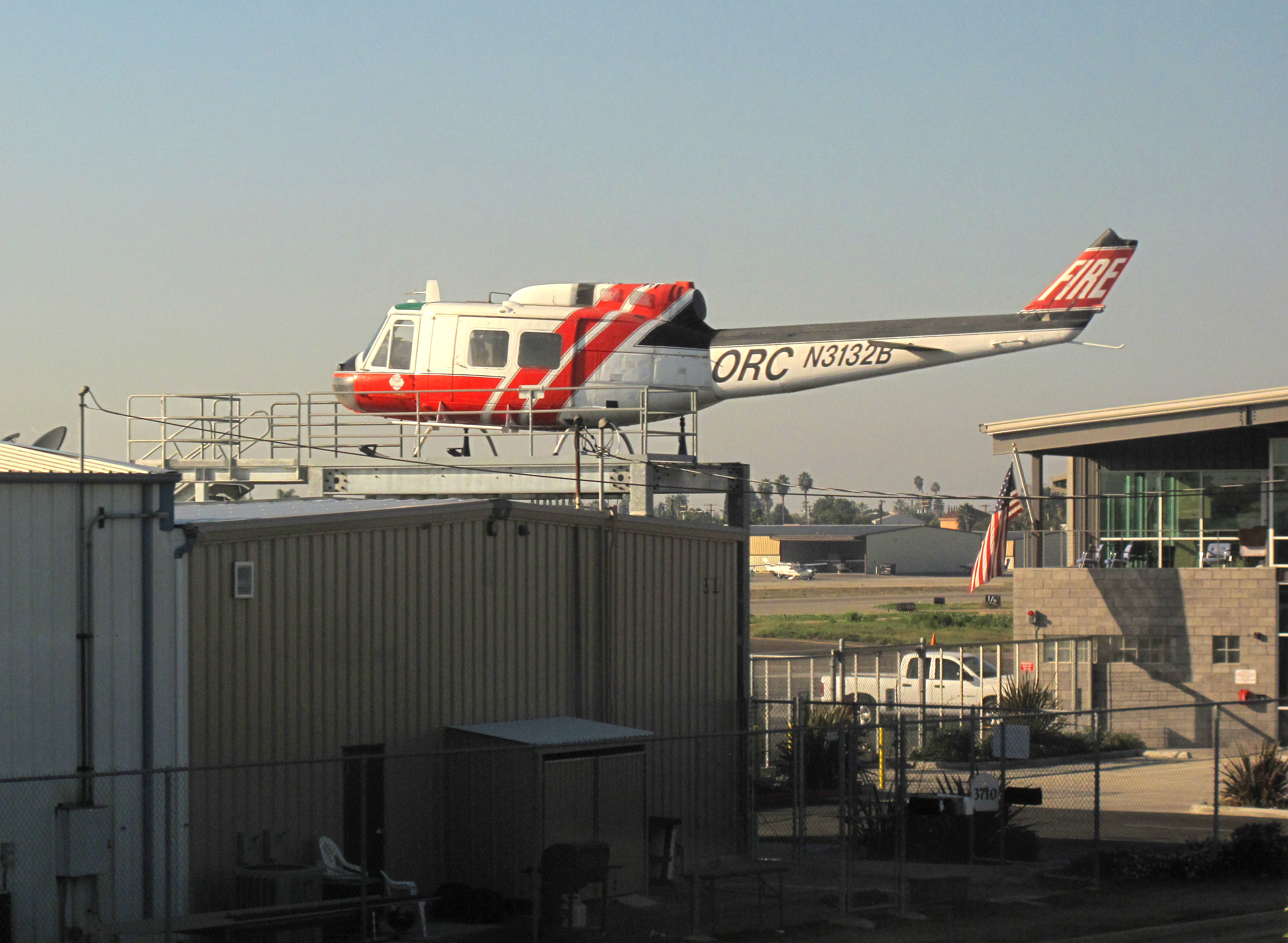
Helicopter at Fullerton Municipal Airport

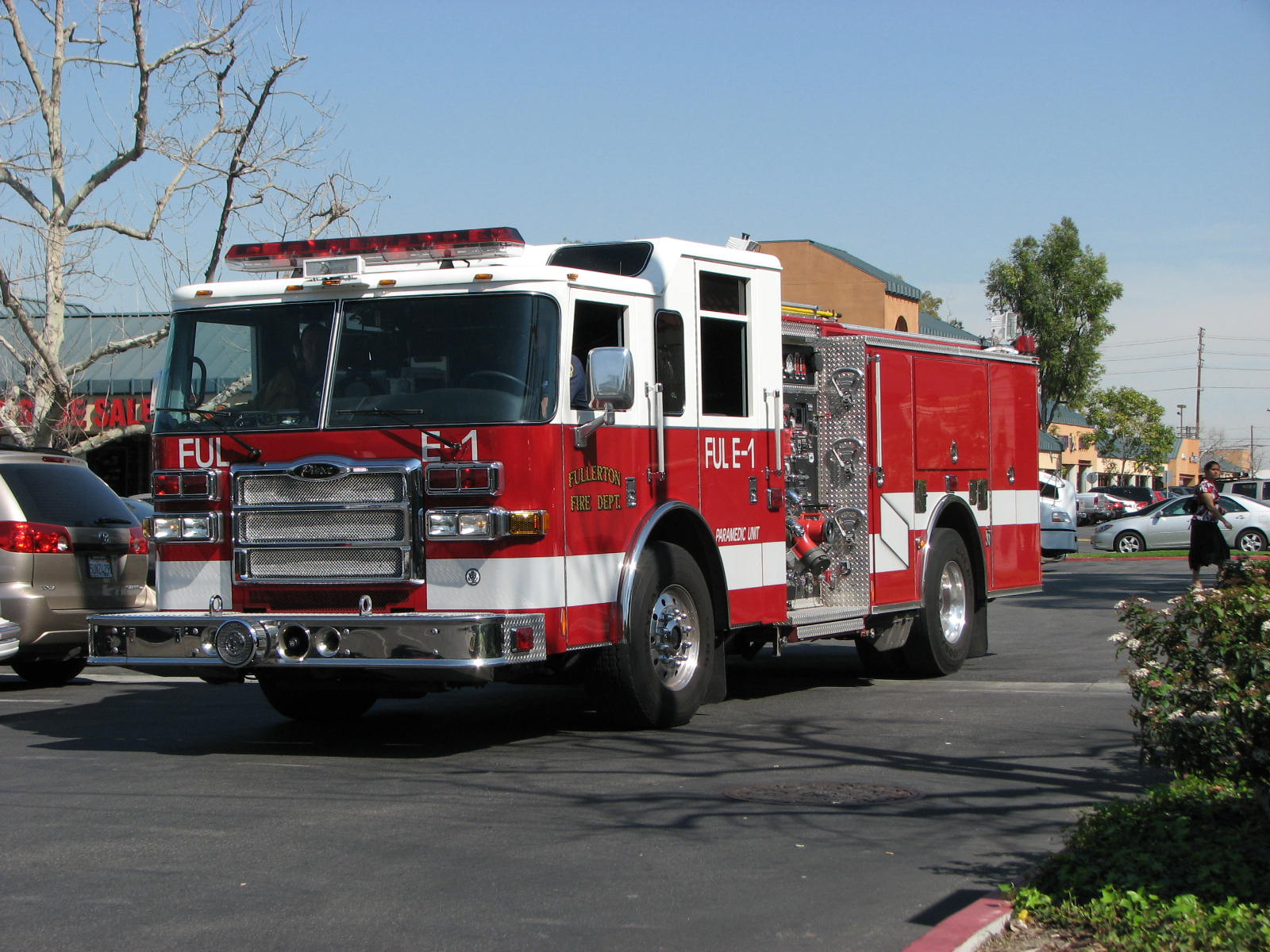
Fullerton Fire Department

Fullerton Transportation Center is served by the Orange County Line of Metrolink, and by Amtrak. It is also a bus terminal for the Orange County Transportation Authority. The city is served by two Amtrak lines: the Southwest Chief (running between Chicago and Los Angeles) and the Pacific Surfliner (running between San Diego and San Luis Obispo).

=== Roads ===
Highways include:

- Interstate 5 (Santa Ana Freeway)
- State Route 39 (Beach Boulevard)
- State Route 57 (Orange Freeway)
- State Route 90 (Imperial Highway)
- State Route 91 (Riverside Freeway)

The main road in Fullerton is Harbor Boulevard.

=== Airport ===
Fullerton Municipal Airport is a general aviation airport located in the former Hughes Company facility.

=== Emergency services ===
Fire protection and emergency medical services are provided by the Fullerton Fire Department with ambulance transport by care Ambulance Service.

The Fullerton Police Department provides law enforcement for the city, while the California State University Police Department provides services around the Cal State Fullerton campus.

=== Health Care ===
Providence St. Jude Medical Center is a hospital in Fullerton.

=== Water Services ===
Water in Fullerton is supplied by the City of Fullerton Water System Management, which sources its water from the Metropolitan Water District of Southern California, importing water from the State Water Project from Northern California, and the Colorado River Aqueduct. Additionally, groundwater is pumped by 8 wells that tap into natural underground reservoirs.

== See also ==
- List of people from Fullerton, California
