= La Habra (disambiguation) =

La Habra, California is a city in the northwestern corner of Orange County, California, United States.

La Habra may also refer to:

- La Habra Heights, California, a city in Los Angeles County, California, United States
- La Habra City School District, located in the Northwestern part of Orange County, California, United States
- La Habra High School, a public co-educational high school located in the Orange County, California city of La Habra
- La Habra Formation, a geologic formation in California preserving fossils
- La Habra Stakes, an American Thoroughbred horse race for three-year-old fillies run at Santa Anita Park in Arcadia, California
- La Habra-Yorba Linda (Pacific Electric), an earlier line of the Pacific Electric Railway, now closed

== See also ==
- Rancho La Habra (also called "Rancho Cañada de La Habra"), a Mexican land grant in present-day Los Angeles County and Orange County, California given in 1839 by Governor Juan Alvarado to Mariano Reyes Roldan
- Habra (disambiguation)
