= List of school districts in Orange County, California =

List of public school districts in Orange County, California

== Community college districts ==
- Coast Community College District
- North Orange County Community College District
- Rancho Santiago Community College District
- South Orange County Community College District

== Unified school districts ==
Unified school districts cover all educational stages from pre-Kindergarten to the 12th grade.

- Brea Olinda Unified School District
- Capistrano Unified School District
- Garden Grove Unified School District
- Irvine Unified School District
- Laguna Beach Unified School District
- Los Alamitos Unified School District
- Newport-Mesa Unified School District
- Orange Unified School District
- Placentia-Yorba Linda Unified School District
- Rowland Unified School District
- Saddleback Valley Unified School District
- Santa Ana Unified School District
- Tustin Unified School District

== Union high school districts ==
Union high school districts encompass various elementary school districts.

- Anaheim Union High School District
- Fullerton Joint Union High School District
- Huntington Beach Union High School District

== Elementary school districts ==
Elementary school districts include:

- Anaheim Elementary School District
- Buena Park School District
- Centralia School District
- Cypress School District
- Fountain Valley School District
- Fullerton School District
- Huntington Beach City School District
- La Habra City School District
- Lowell Joint School District
- Magnolia School District
- Ocean View School District
- Savanna School District
- Westminster School District
