= List of killings by law enforcement officers in the United States, April 2017 =

This is a list of people reported killed by non-military law enforcement officers in the United States in April 2017, whether in the line of duty or not, and regardless of reason or method. The listing documents the occurrence of a death, making no implications regarding wrongdoing or justification on the part of the person killed or officer involved. Killings are arranged by date of the incident that caused death. Different death dates, if known, are noted in the description. The table below lists 76 people.

== April 2017 ==
Date	Name (age) of deceased	Race	Location	Description
2017-04-30	Peter Selis (49)	White	San Diego, CA	
2017-04-30	Devin Hawkins (32)	White	Tom, OK	
2017-04-30	James Edward Ray (46)	Black	Detroit, MI	
2017-04-29	Samir Nicholson (24)	Black	East Orange, NJ	
2017-04-29	Andrew James Lucero (33)	Hispanic	Santa Fe, NM	
2017-04-29	Caleb "CJ" Jackson Jr. (35)	Black	Newport News, VA	
2017-04-29	Gene Bernhardt (59)	White	Papaaloa, HI	
2017-04-29	Jordan Edwards (15)	Black	Balch Springs, Texas (2)	According to police correspondent, the officers were responding around 11 p.m. to a 911 call "reporting several underage kids drunk walking around," and upon arrival, they allegedly heard gunshots and became engaged in an "unknown altercation with a vehicle backing down the street towards the officers in an aggressive manner". An officer fired multiple rifle rounds striking Edwards and killing him. The police later admitted the vehicle was not moving toward the officers, but rather away from them. On August 28, the shooter was found guilty of murder.
2017-04-28	Avery Richard (32)	Black	Atlanta, GA	
2017-04-28	Luis Fernando Pacheco (25)	Hispanic	San Mateo, CA	
2017-04-27	Burgon Sealy Jr. (26)	Black	Bear, DE	
2017-04-27	Tim Holmgren (53)	White	Rapid City, SD	
2017-04-26	Jason Thomas Christian (32)	White	Columbus, OH	
2017-04-26	Charles Bossinger (53)	White	Lewistown, PA	
2017-04-26	Selwyn Aubrey Hall (57)	Black	Jacksonville, FL	
2017-04-25	Juan Manuel Avilla (20)	Hispanic	Bellflower, CA	
2017-04-25	Hakim A. McNair (23)	Black	Newark, NJ	
2017-04-25	Fred Cardenas (52)	Hispanic	Fort Worth, TX	
2017-04-25	Stacy Sturdivant (46)	White	Lufkin, TX	
2017-04-25	Amanda Bennett (20)	White	Johnstown, PA	
2017-04-25	Gavin Williams (27)	Black	Lizella, GA	
2017-04-24	Daezion Turner (15)	Black	Killeen, TX	
2017-04-24	Kendell Wilson (16)	Black	Texas (Houston)	
2017-04-24	Jacy Kevin McManus (35)	White	Wolf Creek, OR	
2017-04-24	Robert Becker (79)	White	Stewartstown, PA	
2017-04-23	Wayne Noel Simard (70)	White	Prescott, AZ	
2017-04-22	William D. Spates (39)	Black	Portage, Michigan	Spates was fatally shot by Officer Grant Crizer during a traffic stop around 1:45 AM, just three hours after being released from an arrest for domestic battery. Grant tasered Spates in the arm before firing eight shots through Spates' windshield, claiming Spates was attempting to run him over. Police Chief Troy Williams initially stated undisclosed actions by Spates led to the shooting, but upon release of further details defended Crizer's actions, saying "[Crizer] did not go to work looking to be murdered by Mr. Spates" and he was "not here to sugarcoat Mr. Spates' proclivity for violence and getting himself arrested."
2017-04-22	Joseph Sin (43)	Asian	Yuba City, CA	
2017-04-22	Michael Wilson-Salzl (24)	White	Hamilton, OH	
2017-04-21	Chance Rickie Thompson (25)	White	West Linn, OR	
2017-04-20	Ray Raymond Valdez (55)	Hispanic	San Antonio, TX	
2017-04-20	Marion Lee Holliday (64)	White	Edmond, OK	
2017-04-20	Damarius Butts (19)	Black	Seattle, Washington	The incident began shortly after 1 p.m. when Seattle police officers were called to a robbery at a convenience store. Two suspects—a 17-year-old female and a 19-year-old male allegedly armed with a handgun—robbed the store and fled north on 1st Avenue, police said. Afterwards officers caught up to the suspects within minutes. A struggle ensued, The male suspect ran to the entryway of an office building, where Butts exchanged gunfire with police and later died from multiple gunshot wounds. The officers' use of lethal force was unanimously ruled justified in 2022. Investigation into the SPD was launched in July 2023 when police body cam evidence for a separate incident revealed a mock tombstone for Butts, suspected to have been stolen from a memorial during a Black Lives Matter protest, was found to be on display in the SPD's East Precinct's breakroom along with a "Make America Great Again" flag.
2017-04-20	Brandon Pequeno (25)	Hispanic	Glendale, AZ	
2017-04-20	Sariah Lane (17)	White	Glendale, AZ	
2017-04-20	Jose A. Trejo (26)	Hispanic	Hardeeville, SC	
2017-04-19	Robert Lee Clark Jr. (30)	White	Summerville, South Carolina	Robert Lee Clark Jr., 30, of Goose Creek, died after his Harley Davidson collided with the deputy's SUV on Main Street, near Richardson Avenue, according to the South Carolina Highway Patrol. The officer involved in the crash, Deputy James Vansant, was placed on leave pending an administrative review, said Berkeley County sheriff's officials.
2017-04-18	Keith Price Jr. (21)	Black	New Castle, Delaware	Detectives from the county police's special investigations squad were seeking to arrest Keith Price, he was the suspect in a previous shooting, Officers found him driving through Wilmington alone in a green Honda Civic and called for marked county police vehicles to assist with stopping his vehicle, officers then exited their vehicles and attempted to arrest Price. He allegedly refused to comply with officers' commands, afterwards an officer fired his handgun at Price killing him on site. The Department of Justice ruled that the lethal force used against Price was justified.
2017-04-18	Casey Edward Desper (32)	White	Brandywine, West Virginia	
2017-04-16	Darren Robert Jahnke (47)	White	St. Paul, MN	
2017-04-15	David Airth (56)	White	Newport Beach, CA	
2017-04-15	Roderick Ronall Taylor (42)	Black	Houston, Texas	
2017-04-15	Isiah Murrietta-Golding (16)	Hispanic	Fresno, California	
2017-04-15	Olugbalah Ridley (33)	Black	West Memphis, Arkansas	Police in Arkansas fatally shot an Indianapolis man after responding to a report of an armed robbery over the weekend. Police say Ridley allegedly brandished a gun when officers approached him and then officers opened fire. Ridley was pronounced dead at the scene, with his body reportedly laying on the ground for hours before being removed. Ridley was killed at the Steeplechase Apartments, the same complex where DeAunta Farrow (12) was also shot by police in 2007.
2017-04-15	Frederick H. Hall (56)	White	Orwell, Ohio	
2017-04-14	Name Withheld ()	Unknown race	Paterson, NJ	
2017-04-14	Ivan Scott Wilson-Dragswolf (24)	Native American	Mandan, ND	
2017-04-14	Charles Shands (33)	White	Spanaway, Washington	After carjacking a vehicle, Shands crashed into a utility box and the vehicle caught fire. Officers reportedly tried to help Shands get out of the vehicle, but say he exited the vehicle armed. Five deputies — Brent Tulloch, Nickolas Jankens, Brad Crawford, Colby Edwards, and Sergio Sanchez — fired at him from two locations until he was dead, and their use of excessive force justified.
2017-04-13	Thomas N. Gezotis Jr. (57)	White	Suffield, Connecticut	Police attempted to arrest Gezotis after tracking a stolen vehicle to a bar. An officer shot and killed Gezotis after he allegedly pointed a gun at police. Gezotis' body was found to have a Crosman Vigilante brand airsoft pistol in his possession.
2017-04-13	Michael Zennie Dial II (33)	White	Sparta, TN	
2017-04-12	Erik Pamias (38)	White	Avondale, AZ	
2017-04-12	Charles Scott Johnston (25)	White	Udall, KS	
2017-04-12	Zelalem Eshetu Ewnetu (28)	Black	Florence, California	According to the LAPD, officers were responding to a burglary when they found Ethiopian civil engineer Ewnetu sitting in his car. Officers approached him after smelling marijuana coming from his vehicle. He allegedly refused to exit his car when asked. Authorities say that when they tried to remove him from the car, Ewnetu allegedly brandished a gun and aimed it at the officers. The deputies then fired at Ewentu, shooting and killing him on-site. Ewnetu's family attests that an LAPD detective told them he was shot twice through this car's back windshield and his handgun found in the trunk, and filled a wrongful death lawsuit in April 2018.
2017-04-12	Kenneth Johnson (25)	Black	Reading, Pennsylvania	Police were called to a domestic dispute in the 700 block of Pear Street at 1:48 p.m., where a 31-year-old woman said her boyfriend allegedly assaulted her and then fled. The first-responding officer found the suspect Johnson in an alley and tried to apprehend him, but he resisted and a struggle ensued. During the struggle, the police officer deployed his taser, striking the man, who fell to the ground. He later died at hospital from cardiac arrest. Despite coroner ruling the death a homicide, the officer was not publicly identified or charged.
2017-04-10	Jeffrey James Findlay (30)	White	Cleveland, Ohio	Police were called to the 3800 block of Mapledale Avenue Sunday evening after a neighbor said she saw Findlay pointing something at his ex-girlfriend. Police say Findlay was in the driveway in front of the home allegedly with a gun when they arrived. Officers tried to get him drop the gun, subsequent to that, shots were fired and he was killed.
2017-04-10	Jarrad Hill (39)	Black	Texas (Houston)	
2017-04-09	Jose Gonzales Rendon (36)	Hispanic	Santa Paula, CA	
2017-04-09	William Baker (36)	White	Ontario, CA	
2017-04-08	Gregory Kever (25)	White	La Crosse, Wisconsin	According to a release, officers were called to the scene at 2214 Peters Drive Saturday for a report of a man acting erratically in the hallways of an apartment complex. Officers arrived on scene and located Kever in the parking lot of the apartment complex allegedly carrying a large knife. Police say Officer used verbal commands, but Kever allegedly refused to drop the knife. Kever charged at an officer while still armed with the knife. At that point officer Jim Konkel fired his weapon killing him on the spot. Konkel was found justified in his killing of Kever.
2017-04-08	Phyllis C. Manderson Davis (73)	White	Naperville, IL	
2017-04-07	Jeffrey Lynn Curry Jr. (33)	Native American	Kyle, SD	
2017-04-06	Richard Xavier Summers (49)	Black	Largo, Florida	According to Sheriff, Summers was inside an Uber vehicle when the vehicle was pulled over afterwards he refused to exit the vehicle and shot at deputies from inside the car. Six deputies fired back at Summers, killing him. Summers was allegedly wanted on a fraud charge.
2017-04-06	Kenneth Francis (37)	Black	Newark, NJ	
2017-04-06	Christopher Wade (39)	Black	Westerville, OH	
2017-04-06	Glenn Watenpool (68)	White	Bradenton, FL	
2017-04-06	Benjamin Ailstock (38)	White	Madison, OH	
2017-04-05	Austin Snyder (22)	White	Little Rock, Arkansas	According to law enforcement officers, Austin Snyder was shot and killed after he attempted to flee officers in a stolen GMC Yukon. He was allegedly wanted on multiple felony warrants.
2017-04-05	Michael Alcaraz (19)	Hispanic	Goshen, IN	
2017-04-04	Michael Maldonado (32)	Hispanic	Texas (Houston)	
2017-04-04	Rogelio Vidal Landa (47)	Hispanic	Bakersfield, CA	
2017-04-04	Stephen Connard Ferry (65)	White	Napa, CA	
2017-04-03	Jose Antonio Hernandez (46)	Hispanic	Pendleton, SC	
2017-04-03	Jack Vincent Burris (66)	Unknown race	Chicago, IL	
2017-04-01	Marcus Antoine Williams (34)	Black	Cantonment, FL	
2017-04-01	Phosowath Sengphong (60)	Asian	Iberia Parish, Louisiana	A man was fatally shot by an Iberia Parish Sheriff's Office deputy after he allegedly brandished a knife during a domestic violence investigation on Saturday afternoon at Spencer Loop, according to the Louisiana State Police.
2017-04-01	Nengmy Vang (45)	Asian	Wausau, Wisconsin	According to investigators the victim was a suspect in multiple homicide incidents, and was in Wausau hospital for injuries he sustained during a standoff with police. The Department of Justice said Saturday morning that Vang sustained what were originally believed to be nonfatal gunshot wounds, but after a week of medical treatment at the hospital, he succumbed to his injuries and died at approximately 1:28 a.m. on April 1. Vang allegedly shot and killed four people on Wednesday, March 22 in Marathon County.

== See also ==
- Death in custody
- Encounter killings by police (India)
- List of American police officers killed in the line of duty
- List of cases of police brutality
- Lists of killings by law enforcement officers
- List of killings by law enforcement officers in the United States
- Police brutality in the United States
- Lynching in the United States
