= La Habra City School District =

School district in California

La Habra City Elementary School District

Address
- 500 North Walnut Street La Habra, Orange County, California, 90631; United States
- Coordinates: 33.9360°N 117.9501°W

District information
- Type: Elementary
- Motto: When we believe, our students achieve.
- Grades: T-K – 8^{th}
- Established: 1896; 130 years ago
- President: Emily Pruitt
- Vice-president: Susan Kolberg-Pritchard, Ph.D.
- Superintendent: Mario A. Carlos, Ed.D.
- Asst. superintendent(s): Sheryl Tecker, Associate Superintendent Human Resources Christeen Betz, Assistant Superintendent Fiscal; Cammie Nguen, Assistant Superintendent Student Support Services; Emily Flesher, Director of Special Programs; Danelle Bautista, Director of Human Resources David H. Soto, Chief Technology Officer
- School board: Five members, four-year terms
- Director of education: Patricia Sandoval, Ed.D.
- Governing agency: California Department of Education
- Schools: Elementary: 7; Middle: 2
- Budget: US$57,202,845 (2019-20)
- NCES District ID: 0620190
- District ID: CDS 30-66563
- Affiliation: Fullerton Joint Union High School District

Students and staff
- Students: 4,656 (2018-19)
- Teachers: 215 (2018-19)
- Staff: 36 (2018-19)
- Student–teacher ratio: 21.66

Other information
- Website: www.lahabraschools.org

The La Habra City Elementary School District is located in the northwestern part of Orange County, California, United States and covers a five-mile area that includes the city of La Habra and parts of La Habra Heights, Brea and Fullerton. The district serves approximately 4,700 students, with seven elementary schools for students in transitional kindergarten (T-K) through sixth grade and two middle schools for grades six through eight.

The Middle School Academies provide students in grades six through eight, with a Comprehensive academic program, which recognizes the special needs and characteristics of this age group. The Academy of the Arts emphasizes the integration of the Arts into the core academic program and has expanded elective offerings in the creative and performing Arts. The Science and Technology Academy focuses on elective courses that integrate Science, Technology, Engineering, Art, and Mathematics. Upon completion of eighth grade, students attend either La Habra High School or Sonora High School. These high schools are part of the Fullerton Joint Union High School District. Students may also take an assessment to get into Troy High School in Fullerton, also part of the Fullerton High School District.
