= List of killings by law enforcement officers in the United States, 2007 =

This is a list of people reported killed by non-military law enforcement officers in the United States in 2007, whether in the line of duty or not, and regardless of reason or method. The listing documents the occurrence of a death, making no implications regarding wrongdoing or justification on the part of the person killed or officer involved. Killings are arranged by date of the incident that caused death. Different death dates, if known, are noted in the description. The table below lists 229 people.

== 2007 ==
| Date | Name (age) of deceased | Race | State (city) | Description |
|---|---|---|---|---|
| 2007‑12‑31 | Michael Cho (25) | | California (La Habra) | Shooting of Michael Cho. Cho was brandishing a tire iron outside a liquor store and vandalizing cars. La Habra police responded to the scene, and within 40 seconds, two officers demanded Cho to drop the tire iron and the officers then fired 11 shots at Cho, killing him. The two police officers were cleared by the Orange County district attorney. Cho's family filed a lawsuit against the city of La Habra alleging wrongful death and negligence and received $250,000. |
| 2007-12-31 | Corey Hosni (37) | | Wisconsin (Milwaukee) | After stabbing Tonya St. Clair to death, Hosni was fatally shot after he refused to drop the knife. |
| 2007-12-28 | Ted Hernandez (50) | | Illinois (Chicago) | |
| 2007-12-26 | Rose Cobb (47) | | Michigan (Detroit) | |
| 2007-12-26 | Kami Stevens (40) | White | California (Long Beach) | |
| 2007‑12‑25 | Aaron Larson | | Washington (Federal Way) | Shot after attacking trooper with fists. Larson was acting erratically, had jumped out of a moving vehicle, had exposed himself and struck vehicles with his belt. Use of Taser was ineffective. |
| 2007‑12‑25 | Allen Burke (18) | | U.S. Virgin Islands (Christiansted) | A police officer and another man shot six people at an apartment complex, killing two. |
| 2007-12-23 | Dameon Howard (22) | | Washington DC | |
| 2007-12-21 | Kashon Smith (17) | | New Jersey (Camden) | Smith was shot and killed by Camden Police Officer Dean Gransden after he reportedly didn't drop weapons that was he holding during a domestic dispute. |
| 2007-12-21 | Jason Wentzell (28) | | Maine (Vassalboro) | |
| 2007-12-13 | Alvaro Zazueta (28) | | California (Bakersfield) | Zazueta was shot and killed by Bakersfield police who were responding to a home invasion robbery. When gunfire came from the suspects police responded, hitting and killing Zazueta. The other suspect was arrested. |
| 2007-12-12 | Timothy Jones Jr (18) | | Tennessee (Memphis) | Jones was killed by Officer Frank Hannah after he allegedly fired shots at officers. |
| 2007-12-04 | Coby Brown (23) | | Maryland (Baltimore) | Brown allegedly robbed a Burger King & then fled. Brown allegedly shot at Officer Modesto Olivio, who then shot him. |
| 2007-11-28 | Donta Manuel (33) | | Florida (Belle Glade) | Manuel and Wallace were sheriff's deputies killed by a pursuing patrol car during a stolen car investigation. |
| 2007-11-28 | Jonathan Wallace | | Florida (Belle Glade) | Manuel and Wallace were sheriff's deputies killed by a pursuing patrol car during a stolen car investigation. |
| 2007-11-20 | Santos Mulero (57) | | New York (Bronx) | |
| 2007-11-18 | David Kostovski (29) | | New York (Brooklyn) | Man shot to death by two officers after threatening officers with a broken wine bottle. |
| 2007-11-15 | Ronald Jones (21) | | Maryland (Baltimore) | |
| 2007-11-13 | Freddie Wilson (34) | | Illinois (Chicago) | |
| 2007-11-12 | Khiel Coppin (18) | | New York (New York City) | Coppin was shot and killed by officers who believed he was reaching for a gun. He did not have a gun on him, but rather a hairbrush. |
| 2007-11-10 | Jose Jimenez (30) | Latino | California (Florence-Firestone) | |
| 2007-11-08 | Christopher Eric Cooper (17) | | Missouri (Independence) | Cooper was struck by Independence Police Officer Dale Daugherty during a high speed pursuit of drunk driver, Wilfedo Pujols. Pujols received 15 years. The officer was not charged. |
| 2007-11-05 | Marvin Carmichael (29) | | Tennessee (Memphis) | Shot to death by officer Corey Hentz after he allegedly fired shots at Hentz. |
| 2007-11-05 | Michael Smith (34) | | Tennessee (Memphis) | Smith, who escaped from the Desoto County jail, was shot dead by police after allegedly tried to run them over with a stolen van. |
| 2007-11-04 | Channing Riordan (31) | | Alabama (Wilmer) | Shot after allegedly welding a wooded chair leg. |
| 2007-11-01 | Robert Lucas (18) | | Alabama (Mobile) | Shot after allegedly pointing a gun at the officer during a foot pursuit. |
| 2007-10-28 | Lamar Bembry (21) | | Pennsylvania (Philadelphia) | Shot in the chest after firing a gun into a crowd while he was leaving the club. |
| 2007-10-27 | Andy Luong (22) | | Maine (Gorham) | |
| 2007-10-27 | Sarah Stanfield (30) | | Idaho (Fruitland) | |
| 2007-10-25 | Donald Hayes (48) | | Idaho (Rigby) | |
| 2007-10-21 | Jayson Tirado (25) | | New York (Harlem) | Shot to death by an off-duty NYPD officer. |
| 2007-10-14 | Jeremy Whitson (23) | | Alabama (Tuscaloosa) | Shot after fighting with the officer who killed him. |
| 2007-10-08 | Ronald Timbers (15) | | Pennsylvania (Philadelphia) | |
| 2007-10-07 | Jordanne Michele Murray (18) | | Wisconsin (Crandon) | Crandon shooting: Sheriff's deputy and police officer Tyler James Peterson shot and killed six people, including his former girlfriend, Murray, before taking his own life. |
| 2007-10-07 | Katrina McCorkle (17) | | Wisconsin (Crandon) | Crandon shooting: Sheriff's deputy and police officer Tyler James Peterson shot and killed six people, including his former girlfriend, Murray, before taking his own life. |
| 2007-10-07 | Leanna Thomas (17) | | Wisconsin (Crandon) | Crandon shooting: Sheriff's deputy and police officer Tyler James Peterson shot and killed six people, including his former girlfriend, Murray, before taking his own life. |
| 2007-10-07 | Bradley Schultz (20) | | Wisconsin (Crandon) | Crandon shooting: Sheriff's deputy and police officer Tyler James Peterson shot and killed six people, including his former girlfriend, Murray, before taking his own life. |
| 2007-10-07 | Aaron Smith (20) | | Wisconsin (Crandon) | Crandon shooting: Sheriff's deputy and police officer Tyler James Peterson shot and killed six people, including his former girlfriend, Murray, before taking his own life. |
| 2007-10-07 | Lindsey Stahl (14) | | Wisconsin (Crandon) | Crandon shooting: Sheriff's deputy and police officer Tyler James Peterson shot and killed six people, including his former girlfriend, Murray, before taking his own life. |
| 2007-10-05 | Samuel Holmes (33) | | Illinois (Chicago) | |
| 2007-10-05 | Bryan Jin-Marie (31) | | Georgia (Atlanta) | Shot & killed after a vehicle pursuit. |
| 2007-10-05 | Frank Ramo (49) | | California (Bakersfield) | Ramos was shot while holding a replica handgun while standing in a street. |
| 2007-10-04 | Jovon Talley-Ford (27) | Black | California (Inglewood) | |
| 2007-10-04 | Samuel Baker | | Georgia (Quitman) | Died from a spinal cord fracture and dislocation Baker suffered when he fell to the ground after being "tased". Police were responding to report of man with knife. Upon being confronted by police, Baker "flashed the officers his knife", at which point the officers used the Taser on Baker. |
| 2007-10-?? | Reynaldo Garcia | Latino | Guam (Piti) | |
| 2007-09-29 | Sonia Garcia (28) | | New York (Bay Shore) | Shot to death by her NYPD fiancée. |
| 2007-09-28 | Damont Reeves (24) | | Pennsylvania (Philadelphia) | Reeves was robbing a 7-Eleven when an off-duty cop shot him. |
| 2007-09-28 | Ronald Battle (25) | | New York (Manhattan) | |
| 2007-09-27 | Meliton Recendez (15) | | Illinois (Chicago) | |
| 2007-09-23 | Gregori Jackson (18) | | Maine (Waldoboro) | |
| 2007-09-22 | Scott White | | Maine (Rumford) | Shot after a seven-hour standoff outside White's former wife's home. |
| 2007-09-17 | DeOnte Rawlings (14) | | Washington DC | Shot in the back of the head by an off-duty cop. |
| 2007-09-17 | unknown | | Illinois (Chicago) | |
| 2007-09-17 | unknown | | Maryland (Baltimore) | Shot after allegedly trying to rob Officer Lawrence Armwood and his girlfriend. |
| 2007-09-09 | Darryl Harcum (45) | | Maryland (Baltimore) | |
| 2007-09-09 | Elaine Coleman (21) | Black | California (Hawthorne) | |
| 2007-09-08 | Reora Askew (38) | | Pennsylvania (Philadelphia) | |
| 2007-09-07 | Juan Calves (51) | | New York (Bronx) | |
| 2007-09-02 | Alonso Cardenas (41) | Latino | California (Pasadena) | |
| 2007-09-01 | Steven Callan (57) | | Alaska, (Anchorage) | |
| 2007-08-30 | Tony Thompson (21) | | Maryland (Baltimore) | Killed after allegedly struggling for control over the officer's service weapon. The cop who shot Thompson had previously shot four other men. |
| 2007-08-27 | Guy Ray (44) | | Kentucky (Louisville) | |
| 2007-08-22 | Johnny Goodwin (21) | | Illinois (Chicago) | |
| 2007-08-22 | Thomas Campbell (50) | | Maryland (Baltimore) | Died minutes after being tasered. |
| 2007-08-21 | Rickey Harvey (20) | Black | California (Hawthorne) | |
| 2007-08-14 | Lucky Adams (37) | | Alaska (Fairbanks) | |
| 2007-08-14 | Brent McKinney (45) | Black | California (Boyle Heights) | |
| 2007-08-14 | Peter Rodriguez (23) | Latino | California (East Los Angeles) | |
| 2007-08-13 | Christopher Ogletree (47) | | Alabama, (Birmingham) | Shot to death after confronting an officer with a knife. |
| 2007-08-09 | John Rico (30) | Latino | California (El Sereno) | |
| 2007-08-09 | Anita Delgado (39) | Latina | California (Sylmar) | |
| 2007-08-06 | Aaron Harrison (18) | | Illinois (Chicago) | |
| 2007-08-05 | Jason Henry (20) | | Pennsylvania (Philadelphia) | Allegedly tased then shot. |
| 2007-08-04 | Arturo Guzman (29) | Latino | California (Tapia Park) | |
| 2007-08-03 | Jason Taft (25) | | Washington DC | |
| 2007-08-02 | Clyde Patrick (44) | | Alabama (Birmingham) | Died after getting tased 18 times. |
| 2007-07-29 | Julio Rivera (20) | | Pennsylvania (Philadelphia) | Rivera was arguing with his girlfriend in a vehicle. His girlfriend got out and flagged down an officer. Rivera allegedly got out of the vehicle and shot at the officer, who then shot and killed him. |
| 2007-07-25 | Jeremy Leech (36) | | Idaho (Orofino) | |
| 2007-07-24 | Mark Gregg (25) | White | California (Hollywood) | |
| 2007-07-23 | Shirley Fontanez (18) | | New York (Bronx) | Shot to death by her 40-year-old NYPD boyfriend who then turned the gun on himself. |
| 2007-07-22 | Cpl Alexander Larkin (25) | | Maryland (Baltimore) | Shot after allegedly firing a gun at an officer who was trying to break up a fight. Larkin was a member of the Army. |
| 2007-07-22 | Deshawn Adams (24) | Black | California (Gardena) | |
| 2007-07-20 | Jimmy Duncan (23) | | Idaho (Caldwell) | |
| 2007-07-18 | Victor Garcia (14) | Latino | California (Los Angeles) | |
| 2007-07-16 | Aaron Richard Snyder | | Colorado (Denver) | Shot after advancing on police while exposing revolver in holster under tuxedo jacket. Snyder was at the State Capital and had declared himself "the emperor of Colorado". |
| 2007-07-15 | Ronald Brandon | | Wisconsin (Madison) | Brandon had a realistic-looking pellet gun pointed at officer Matthew Kenny and another, in what investigators believe was a "suicide-by-cop". Officer Kenny shot and killed the man. His actions were later ruled justified and he received the Medal of Valor, the police department's top honor, for that shooting. Officer Kenny was later responsible for another ruled-justified police shooting of Tony Robinson. |
| 2007-07-14 | Charlie Wilson (20) | Black | California (Torrance) | |
| 2007-07-14 | Shaun McCoy (22) | Black | California (Torrance) | |
| 2007-07-09 | Deandre Baldon (17) | | New York (Buffalo) | Shot and killed because the officer thought Baldon's belt buckle was a gun. |
| 2007-07-08 | Steven Miller (30) | | Pennsylvania (Philadelphia) | Miller, who was having a mental episode, was shot at by police between 80 and 85 times. Miller was hit 20 times. |
| 2007-07-08 | Nathaniel Cobbs Jr (25) | | New York (Newburgh) | Killed by a police dog and Taser |
| 2007-07-07 | Victor Gordon (23) | | New York (Brooklyn) | |
| 2007-07-07 | Jevon Royall (30) | | Michigan (Detroit) | |
| 2007-06-30 | Logan Brizzee (19) | | Idaho (Twin Falls) | Killed after brandishing a gun. |
| 2007-06-26 | Aaron Borden (26) | Black | California (Vermont Square) | |
| 2007-06-24 | Cesar Wilfredo Lopez | | Georgia (Athens) | Shot after pointing a gun at officers. Lopez and four other people in a group were suspects in a pair of shootings that occurred earlier that night. |
| 2007-06-23 | DeAunta Farrow (12) | | Arkansas (West Memphis) | Farrow was carrying a replica BB handgun in his hand and was shot twice by a police officer outside an apartment complex. Prosecutors considered the shooting to be justified. |
| 2007-06-18 | Steven McUmber (45) | | New York (Potsdam) | |
| 2007-06-14 | Jessie Davis | | Ohio (Lake Township) | Davis's husband, Bobby Lee Cutts Jr., an officer with the nearby Canton police, killed her during a fight in their home, and then had a friend help him hide the body in a county park near Akron. He was convicted and sentenced to life without parole the following year |
| 2007-06-13 | Detrick Ford (20) | Black | California (Los Angeles) | |
| 2007-06-09 | Donald Skinner (49) | | Georgia (Atlanta) | Killed by 49-year-old Charles Alan Smith for life insurance. |
| 2007-06-05 | Jose Ramos Alvarez | | Washington (Yakima) | Shot during fight with police during which Alvarez produced a pistol. Police were attempting to arrest Alvarez as the prime suspect of a recent murder. |
| 2007-05-30 | Juan Sanchez (21) | Latino | California (Huntington Park) | |
| 2007-05-30 | Anthony Smashum | | Georgia (Savannah) | Shot while climbing fence to escape from police. Officers approached Smashum attempting to arrest him on a warrant. Smashum fought with officers before fleeing. |
| 2007-05-28 | Jamar Witherspoon (18) | Black | California (Los Angeles) | |
| 2007-05-22 | Steve Bucholtz (54) | | Wisconsin (Milwaukee) | |
| 2007-05-19 | Ernest Barber (26) | | Pennsylvania (Philadelphia) | Killed after allegedly raising his gun at officers. |
| 2007-05-19 | Ronald Ball (60) | Black | California (Los Angeles) | |
| 2007-05-18 | Fermin Aruz (41) | | New York (Bronx) | Aruz was unarmed. |
| 2007-05-16 | Carlos Ornelas (42) | Latino | California (Lake View Terrace) | |
| 2007-05-14 | Terrell Heath (31) | | Maryland (Baltimore) | Heath died after having a heart attack, which was caused by being tased. |
| 2007-05-13 | Ricardo Benitez (47) | | Idaho (Meridian) | Officer Brian Lueddeke shot and killed Benitez inside his home after he allegedly jumped toward the officer with a bread knife. Police say Benitez threatened his family and violated a court order, and the county prosecutor found the shooting justified. His wife and two sons filed a claim against the city. |
| 2007-05-13 | Anthony Castro-Carrillo | | Puerto Rico (Carolina) | Officer William Vazquez-Baez and several members of La ONU stormed the home of Castro-Carrillo dressed as police officers and killed him. Vazquez-Baez was also involved in the murders of two other men, who were killed by La ONU members. |
| 2007-05-12 | Ventura Saenz (19) | Latino | California (Compton) | |
| 2007-05-11 | Juan Velasco (30) | Latino | California (Los Angeles) | |
| 2007-05-10 | Quinton Monroe (23) | | Maryland (Baltimore) | Killed after pulling out a loaded gun from his car. |
| 2007-05-10 | Guiatree Harpati (22) | | New York, (Queens) | |
| 2007-05-10 | Andrew MacEarcher (52) | White | California (El Segundo) | |
| 2007-05-09 | Richard Tyson (20) | Black | California (Inglewood) | |
| 2007-05-06 | Bobby Walker (15) | | Texas (Dallas) | |
| 2007-05-05 | Gerardo Diaz (46) | | Texas (Dallas) | Shot and killed by FBI agents in the parking lot of a Walmart. |
| 2007-05-02 | Even Harlow (25) | | Kentucky, (Louisville) | |
| 2007-05-01 | Antonio Escareal (51) | Asian | California (Carson) | |
| 2007-05-01 | Quinzell Elam (34) | | Pennsylvania (Philadelphia) | Killed after allegedly pointing a shotgun at the police. |
| 2007-04-30 | Hay Nhat Duong (25) | | New Jersey (Township of Hamilton Atlantic County) | Police Officer Leo Rudolph shot Duong, after he came toward the officer and made a motion as if to reach for a gun after several warnings to drop to the ground. Duong had no weapon. |
| 2007-04-30 | Even Harlow (16) | | Kentucky (Louisville) | |
| 2007-04-29 | Rene Perez (42) | | New York (Mt. Kisco) | Beaten to death. |
| 2007-04-28 | unknown | | Maryland (Baltimore) | Killed after he drew a firearm. |
| 2007-04-26 | Willie Norwood (35) | | Tennessee (Memphis) | Norwood was suspected of brandishing a gun during a robbery at a university cafeteria. When campus police approached Norwood and ordered him to drop the gun and get on the ground, Norwood allegedly refused and pointed what appeared to be a chrome handgun at officers, who shot and killed him. It turned out to be a toy gun. |
| 2007-04-26 | Pedro Renteria (21) | Latino | California (Harbor Gateway) | |
| 2007-04-25 | Travis Trim (23) | | New York (Margaretville) | |
| 2007-04-24 | Uywanda Peterson (43) | | Maryland (Baltimore) | Died after being tased in the chest. |
| 2007-04-16 | Gilbert Bradley (54) | | Pennsylvania (Philadelphia) | |
| 2007-04-16 | Victor Sandoval (41) | Latino | California (La Puente) | |
| 2007-04-15 | Ron Pettaway | | Georgia (Fulton County) | Shot outside a bar. Police were responding to report of a fight. |
| 2007-04-14 | Javier Chavez (30) | Latino | California (Jefferson Park) | |
| 2007-04-13 | Ricardo Benitez (47) | | Idaho (Meridian) | Killed after brandishing a knife. |
| 2007-04-11 | Luis Salinas (23) | Latino | California (North Hills) | |
| 2007-04-11 | Mario Fernando Torres Gomez (34) | Latino | Oklahoma (Tulsa) | Gomez was unarmed and fleeing from police when he was shot at the I-44 & 169 interchange. The officer who shot Gomez was cleared in the shooting, but in 2010 the city paid $85,000 to settle a lawsuit by Gomez's family. |
| 2007-04-09 | Richard DeSantis (30) | | California (Santa Rosa) | Killed by rubber bullets when he didn't comply with the officers orders fast enough. |
| 2007-04-09 | Eugene Gilliam (22) | | Alabama (Prattville) | Died seven hours after being tased. |
| 2007-04-09 | John Goudeaux (45) | White | California (Lake Balboa) | |
| 2007-04-07 | Jason Yule (27) | | California (Roseville) | Killed after charging at an officer with a pipe. |
| 2007-04-06 | Edmund Wong (40) | Latino | California (Downey) | Wong was shot several times by officers with the Downey Police Department who were responding to reports of an armed man getting into a truck on the 9000 block of Pico Vista Street. Officers arrived at the scene and tried to stop the fleeing suspect. After crashing his silver Toyota into a patrol car and exiting the vehicle with what appeared to be a gun, the Downey patrol officers opened fire, striking Wong repeatedly. He was pronounced dead at 4:03 p.m. After his death, it was learned that Mr. Wong himself was the party who contacted the police, giving them a detailed description of his vehicle, his own physical description and a description of his weapons. |
| 2007-04-03 | Milton Wilcox | | Georgia (Candler County) | Died from injuries sustained during motor vehicle accident. Wilcox was the passenger in a vehicle struck by a police cruiser just after the officer "looked down to adjust his computer and CD player." |
| 2007-04-03 | Charles Williams (40) | | California (Roseville) | |
| 2007-04-02 | Cesar Mendez (20) | | California (Ukiah) | |
| 2007-04-02 | Jamie Flores (29) | | California (Lennox) | |
| 2007-03-30 | James Peters (42) | | Maine (Auburn) | |
| 2007-03-24 | Myron West (25) | | Wisconsin (Milwaukee) | |
| 2007-03-24 | Jerome Alford | | Washington (Spokane) | Shot in the chest during a confrontation with police officer Dan Torok, who was also involved in the death of Otto Zehm the year prior. |
| 2007-03-22 | Brandon Washington (22) | | Texas (Dallas) | |
| 2007-03-21 | Anthony Bosworth II (30) | | Idaho (Nampa) | Shot after shooting at officers. Bosworth was wanted for the murder of "Joshua Schmidt". |
| 2007-03-20 | Rahman Jenkins (20) | | Pennsylvania (Philadelphia) | |
| 2007-03-17 | David Mendoza (42) | | California (West Covina) | Died after being tased 14 times by officer Enrique Macias. |
| 2007-03-17 | Marlon St. Mark German | | Washington (Kennewick) | Shot after threatening to kill his estranged girlfriend and striking her with a knife. Police were responding to report of domestic violence. |
| 2007-03-15 | Antonio Escareal (51) | | California (Carson) | Shot and killed after allegedly coming at officers with a knife. Escareal died May 1. |
| 2007-03-15 | Jason Kopp (20) | | Pennsylvania (Philadelphia) | |
| 2007-03-14 | David Garvin (42) | | New York (Manhattan) | Shot to death after recently shooting and killing four people. |
| 2007-03-13 | David Weisman (34) | White | California (Los Angeles) | Shot and killed after allegedly confronting officers with a knife. |
| 2007-03-13 | Corey Mickins (25) | | New York (Harlem) | |
| 2007-03-13 | Michael Eugene Sullivan (24) | | California (Bakersfield) | Sullivan stole a knife from a cutlery store at Valley Plaza Mall in Bakersfield, California. He was pursued by a Bakersfield Police officer assigned to the mall. Outside the mall the pursuit was joined by Police officer Erick South and his K-9. Approaching Sullivan, South released his dog on Sullivan. Sullivan stabbed South in the arm. South shot Sullivan who was pronounced dead at a local hospital. |
| 2007-03-12 | Jeremiah Chass (16) | | California (Sebastopol) | Jeremiah Chass was holding his 6-year-old brother hostage in his family's minivan outside their home, threatening to kill him with a pocket knife with a 2-inch blade. After Chass released his brother, two Sonoma County Sheriff's deputies pepper sprayed him, and then Chass started kicking one of the deputies in the face, and waving the knife around. The deputies fired 8 shots, killing Chass. Chass's family filed a federal civil rights lawsuit against the county of Sonoma and the deputies, alleging wrongful death and excessive force. In 2009, they received a $1.75 million settlement. |
| 2007-03-10 | Kristen McKenzie (21) | | New York (Brooklyn) | |
| 2007-03-08 | Dennis Osceola (46) | | Florida (Hollywood) | Osceola was found by officers sitting on his porch at 2 a.m. with an AR-15 in his lap. Osceola was tasered three times and when he allegedly continued to advance, was shot dead. |
| 2007-03-07 | Gary Vierow (43) | | Florida (Jensen Beach) | |
| 2007-03-07 | Rene Robinson (45) | | California (San Francisco) | |
| 2007-03-05 | Curtis Dixon (24) | | Pennsylvania (Philadelphia) | |
| 2007-03-05 | Junior DeSa (31) | | Florida (Pompano Beach) | Desa was shot after dead after holding his roommate at knife-point and in a chokehold. The roommate was also wounded. |
| 2007-03-04 | Antonio Bland (25) | Black | California (Exposition Park) | |
| 2007-02-24 | Marcellus Wright (25) | Black | California (Los Angeles) | Shot and killed after allegedly brandishing a firearm. |
| 2007-02-24 | Steven Brown (50) | | Florida (Ocala) | Brown and a female companion pulled into a Walgreens drunk & acting erratically. His companion shoplifted a number of items. When police got to the scene they found brown and his companion uncooperative. After being tasered, Brown allegedly drew a gun and was fatally shot. |
| 2007-02-23 | Haki Thurston (22) | | California (Santa Rosa) | Thurston was wanted for killing his cousin. When Thurston tried to run, police shot at him 27 times, hitting him 13 times. |
| 2007-02-20 | Joel Perales (22) | | California (Fresno) | Shot after wounded three officers and a bystander at a Mardi Gras celebration. |
| 2007-02-14 | James Peracchi (34) | | California (Tracy) | |
| 2007-02-12 | Carlton Mims (22) | | Texas (Dallas) | |
| 2007-02-12 | Artrell Dickerson (18) | | Michigan (Detroit) | |
| 2007-02-12 | Berry Millsap | | Washington (Tacoma) | Shot after pointing a cordless drill at police. Police were responding to report of a domestic disturbance. Millsap had met officers on porch of home and had threatened to shoot them if they went inside the house. Millsap ran into the house and hid behind couch, then stood up pointing a drill at officers. |
| 2007-02-11 | Francisco Mondragon Saucedo (24) | Latino | California (Los Angeles) | |
| 2007-01-10 | Raheem Pridgen (27) | | Pennsylvania (Philadelphia) | |
| 2007-02-10 | Noe Rojas-Godinez (17) | | California (San Diego) | |
| 2007-02-09 | Lee Caples (58) | | Tennessee (Memphis) | Lee was killed by two undercover cops when he allegedly fired a gun. |
| 2007-02-08 | Jose Hernandez (36) | Latino | California (Los Angeles) | |
| 2007-02-03 | Addiel Meza (21) | | California (Oakland) | Meza fired a gun on a residential street. An officer who responded to the shooting fatally shot Meza. |
| 2007-02-03 | Mauricio Cornejo (31) | | California (Los Angeles) | Died after being chased and then restrained. |
| 2007-02-02 | Ernest Weston (41) | | Florida (Fort Myers) | Weston was shot after he allegedly pointed a gun at officers. Another person was also injured. |
| 2007-02-01 | Douglas Merjil (30) | | California (Fresno) | Shot after confronted officers with a shotgun. |
| 2007-01-30 | Lionel Sands (60) | | Florida (Marianna) | Lionel Sands was killed by police along with Daniel Brown, after robbing a home and killing Mellie McDaniel and deputy Harold Michael Altman. |
| 2007-01-30 | Daniel Brown (54) | | Florida (Marianna) | Lionel Sands was killed by police along with Daniel Brown, after robbing a home and killing Mellie McDaniel and deputy Harold Michael Altman. |
| 2007-01-29 | Michael Lauda (19) | | Florida (Kissimmee) | |
| 2007-01-27 | Isaac Singletary (80) | | Florida (Jacksonville) | Singletary was known to carry a firearm to chase away drug dealers from his property. Singletary confronted two undercover officers on narcotics duty; they allegedly ordered him to drop his weapon, and when he allegedly refused, and he was shot. Singletary's family won a $200K wrongful death settlement. |
| 2007-01-30 | Jeane Kane | | New York (Staten Island) | |
| 2007-01-27 | Issac Singletary (27) | | California (Garden Grove) | Shot after allegedly threatening officers with a sledgehammer. |
| 2007-01-27 | Douglas Woods III (18) | | Florida (Jacksonville) | Woods was shot when he allegedly tried to rob an undercover cop. Woods allegedly fired at the officers & the officer returned fire. |
| 2007-01-26 | James White (33) | | Kentucky (Louisville) | |
| 2007-01-26 | Mario Vargas (36) | | California (San Francisco) | Shot after allegedly pulling a gun out on officers. |
| 2007-01-26 | Anthony Gilmore (23) | | Alabama (Theodore) | Gilmore exited his vehicle and then wounded an officer, before being killed by returned fire. |
| 2007-01-23 | Keith Watkins (41) | | California (Riverside) | Officers shot to death he allegedly drove toward them. |
| 2007-01-23 | Joshua Wright (16) | | Pennsylvania (Philadelphia) | Shot and killed by his mother, who was a PPD cop. |
| 2007-01-22 | Matthew Powell (24) | | California (Los Angeles) | Killed after allegedly pointing a shotgun at an officer. |
| 2007-01-20 | Tyronn Sparks (16) | | Pennsylvania (Philadelphia) | |
| 2007-01-20 | Adam Quinonez (19) | | Wisconsin (Milwaukee) | |
| 2007-01-18 | Douglas Woods III (18) | | Florida (Jacksonville) | Woods was shot when he allegedly tried to rob an undercover cop. Woods allegedly fired at the officers & the officer returned fire. |
| 2007-01-17 | Robert Sullivan | | Washington (Seattle) | Shot after shooting at and injuring one officer. Police had confronted Sullivan when they saw him shooting at someone else. |
| 2007-01-15 | Harry Shuler (65) | | Florida (Jacksonville) | Shot after he came outside his house a firearm during a standoff. |
| 2007-01-14 | Charles Kelley (26) | | Pennsylvania (Philadelphia) | |
| 2007-01-12 | David Boone (43) | | Wisconsin (Milwaukee) | |
| 2007-01-10 | Phillip Miller (43) | | California (Los Angeles) | Miller, who was unarmed, was shot after reaching into his waistband. |
| 2007-01-10 | Joe Berry (48) | | Alabama (Montgomery) | Shot after allegedly coming at deputies with a knife. |
| 2007-01-09 | Christopher Lewis (34) | | Texas (Dallas) | Shot during a domestic disturbance. |
| 2007-01-09 | Pedro Madri (44) | | California (Fresno) | Died after being tased numerous times. |
| 2007-01-08 | Robert McIntosh (23) | | Texas (Houston) | |
| 2007-01-08 | Harry Lowman Jr. | | North Carolina (Blowing Rock) | |
| 2007-01-07 | Glenn Pearson (62) | | Arizona (Green Valley) | |
| 2007-01-07 | Chris Jackson (17) | | California, (San Bernardino) | |
| 2007-01-07 | Blondel Lassegue | | New York (Queens) | |
| 2007-01-07 | Omar Esparza | | Texas (Houston) | |
| 2007-01-06 | Douglas Ilten (45) | | Florida (Fort Pierce) | |
| 2007-01-06 | Justin Wylczynski (21) | | Maryland (Essex) | |
| 2007-01-05 | Marcus Kirk Jr. (3) | | Georgia (Hampton) | |
| 2007-01-05 | David Daniels (57) | | Minnesota (Stillwater) | |
| 2007-01-05 | Calvin Thompson (42) | | North Carolina (Gastonia) | |
| 2007-01-04 | Zachary Cooke | | California (Eureka) | Eureka Police Department officers, Terry Liles and Steven Watson, ATF agent, Michael Medlin, and a detective of the Humboldt County Sheriff's Office, Marvin Kirkpatrick, were raiding a home. During a raid, a shotgun-like flash was seen momentarily, causing Liles to fire 15 shots. Medlin, believing Liles was shot, fired at the drywall of a room where Cooke was hiding. Cooke died with eleven gunshot wounds, and another wounded subject was discovered moments later. |
| 2007-01-03 | Howard Williams (37) | | California (Richmond) | |
| 2007-01-03 | Steven Rupard (22) | | Tennessee (Johnson City) | |
| 2007-01-01 | Ivan Ariza (37) | | Nevada (Las Vegas) | |
| 2007-01-01 | Michael Warren (23) | | Georgia (Lawrenceville) | |
| 2007-01-01 | James Johnson (28) | | Kansas (Great Bend) | Shot after he allegedly drop a shotgun. |
| 2007-01-01 | Bryan Jones (20) | | Pennsylvania (Philadelphia) | |

== See also ==
- Death in custody § United States
- Henry A. Wallace Police Crime Public Database
- List of cases of police brutality
- List of countries with annual rates and counts for killings by law enforcement officers
- List of law enforcement officers killed in the line of duty in the United States
- List of law enforcement officers convicted for an on-duty killing in the United States
- List of shootings by US immigration agents
- List of police reforms related to the George Floyd protests
- List of unarmed African Americans killed by law enforcement officers in the United States
- Lists of killings by law enforcement officers
- Police brutality in the United States
- Police misconduct § United States
- Police riot § United States
- Police use of deadly force in the United States
