= Michael Cho =

Michael Cho may refer to:

- Michael Cho (illustrator), Canadian artist
- Michael Cho (died 2007), see killing of Michael Cho
