= Lowell High School (Whittier, California) =

High school in California, United States

Coordinates: 33°55′24″N 117°58′58″W

Lowell High School was a public high school in the Fullerton Joint Union High School District from September 1961 until June 1980, when it was closed because of declining student enrollment. It was a four-year institution, with students coming primarily from Rancho-Cañada and Starbuck Junior High schools in the Lowell Joint School District. The school athletic name was the Patriots, and its mascots were known as Johnny Patriot and Janie Patriot.

== Campus information ==
Lowell High School was located on 16200 E. Amber Valley Drive, Whittier, CA 90604. The site was purchased and now occupied by Southern California University of Health Sciences in 1981. The site is 38 acres (150,000 m^{2}), about 400m per side. Lowell had a pool, a track, a gymnasium, baseball fields, and a performing arts center. It played its football home games at nearby La Habra High School.

== Notable alumni ==
- Martin Manley, 1970, US Assistant Secretary of Labor, founder/CEO of Alibris
- Jack Russell, musician, Great White
- Brent Boyd, 1975, football player, Minnesota Vikings
- Dave Leiper 1980 MLB relief pitcher
- Michael Sweet, 1980 lead singer of Stryper
- Scott Thomson. 1972 actor, most notable for Police Academy and Twister.

== See also ==
- List of closed secondary schools in California
