= John N. Lotz =

United States Air Force general

John M. Lotz is a United States Air Force general and former Assistant Adjutant General for Air of the California National Guard.

== Biography ==
A native of Riverside, California, Lotz graduated from La Habra High School in La Habra, California. He then graduated from California State University, Long Beach and Harvard Business School.

== Career ==
Lotz originally enlisted in the United States Navy Reserve in 1959. After leaving the Navy Reserve, Lotz enlisted in the United States Air Force. He was commissioned an officer in 1964 and stationed at Truax Field in Madison, Wisconsin. From there, he was stationed at Vandenberg Air Force Base in Santa Barbara County, California.

In 1974, Lotz was appointed to the California Air National Guard and assigned to the 261st Combat Communications Squadron in Los Angeles, California. He would assume command of the squadron in 1979. That year, he also graduated from the Air Command and Staff College. In 1982, he was appointed Deputy Commander of the 162d Combat Communications Group and was promoted to Commander in 1989. He became Assistant Adjutant General for Air of the California National Guard in 1990. Lotz retired in 1997.

Awards he received include the Meritorious Service Medal with oak leaf cluster, the Air Force Commendation Medal, the Outstanding Unit Award with two oak leaf clusters, the Organizational Excellence Award, the Combat Readiness Medal with oak leaf cluster, the National Defense Service Medal with service star, the Air Force Longevity Service Award with one silver and one bronze oak leaf cluster, the Armed Forces Reserve Medal, the Small Arms Marksmanship Ribbon and the Air Force Training Ribbon.
