= La Habra Heights, California =

City in California, United States

- City
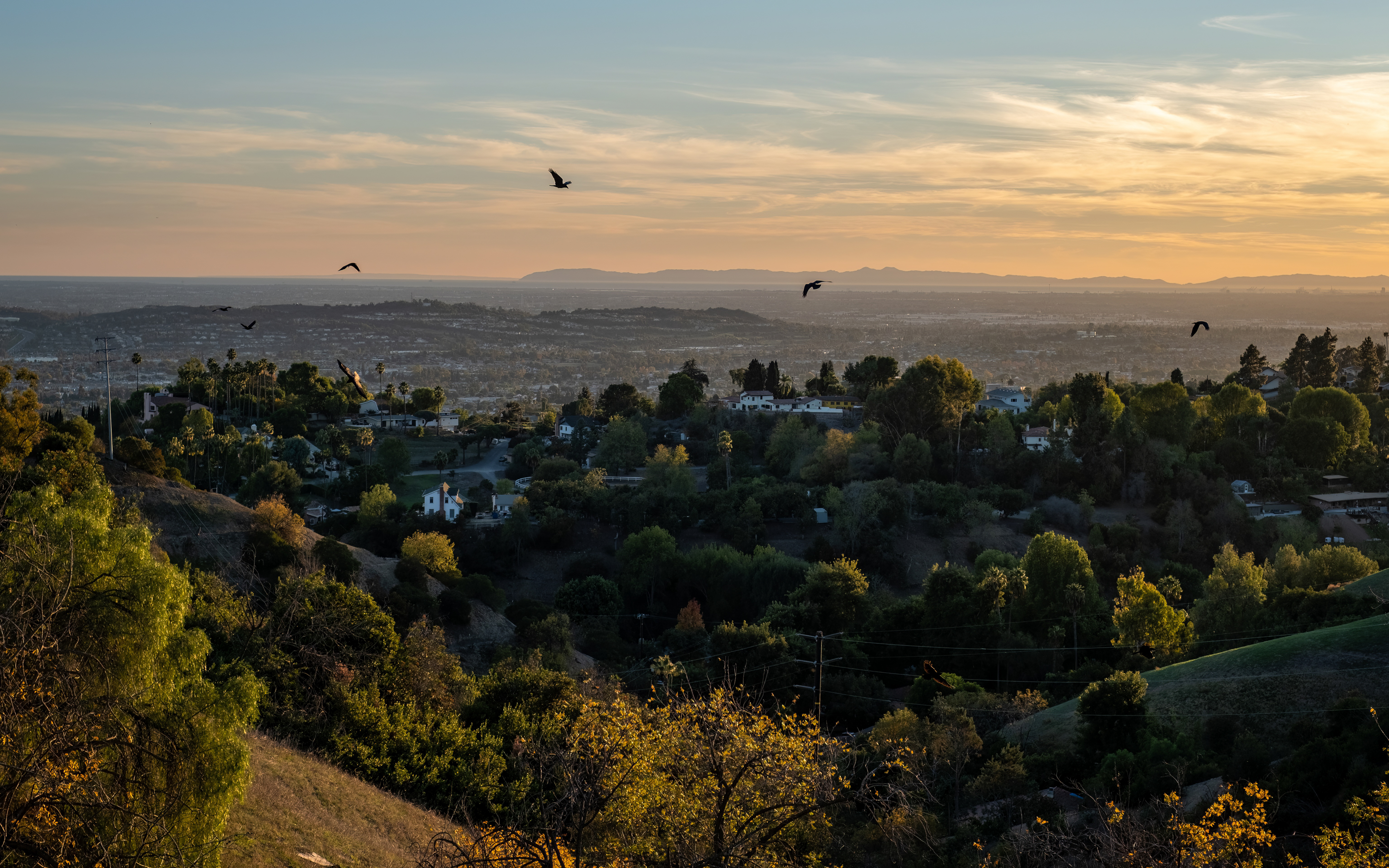
- La Habra Heights

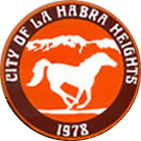
- Seal
- Interactive map of La Habra Heights, California
- Location in the United States La Habra Heights (California) La Habra Heights (the United States)
- Coordinates: 33°57′50″N 117°57′10″W
- Country: United States
- State: California
- County: Los Angeles
- Incorporated: December 4, 1978

Government
  - Type: Council-Manager
  - Mayor: John Pespisa
  - Mayor Pro Tem: Carol Engelhardt
  - City Council: Brian Bergman; Greg Stefflre; Norm Zezula
  - City Manager: Rafferty Wooldridge

Area
  - Total: 6.16 sq mi (15.96 km^{2})
  - Land: 6.16 sq mi (15.95 km^{2})
  - Water: 0 sq mi (0.00 km^{2}) 0.03%
- Elevation: 738 ft (225 m)

Population (2020)
  - Total: 5,682
  - Density: 922.7/sq mi (356.2/km^{2})
- Time zone: UTC-8 (Pacific)
  - Summer (DST): UTC-7 (PDT)
- ZIP code: 90631
- Area code: 562
- FIPS code: 06-39304
- GNIS feature IDs: 1660854, 2411572
- Website: www.lhhcity.org

La Habra Heights is a city in Los Angeles County, California, United States. The population was 5,682 at the 2020 census, up from 5,325 at the 2010 census. La Habra Heights is a suburban canyon community located on the border of Orange and Los Angeles counties. The zoning is 1-acre (4,000 m^{2}) lots with a variety of home and ranch style properties. La Habra Heights features open space and there are no sidewalks in the community. La Habra Heights has no commercial activity with few exception. Hacienda Park is the main park in the city and runs along Hacienda Road.

== Geography ==
La Habra Heights is located at 33°57′50″N 117°57′10″W (33.964012, -117.952837).

According to the United States Census Bureau, the city has a total area of 6.2 square miles (16 km^{2}), over 99% of it land.

=== Climate ===
According to the Köppen Climate Classification system, La Habra Heights has a warm-summer Mediterranean climate, abbreviated "Csa" on climate maps.

== Demographics ==
Historical population
Census	Pop.	Note	%±
1980	4,786		—
1990	6,226		30.1%
2000	5,712		−8.3%
2010	5,325		−6.8%
2020	5,682		6.7%
U.S. Decennial Census; 1860–1870 1880-1890; 1900 1910 1920; 1930 1940 1950; 1960 1970 1980; 1990 2000 2010; 2020

La Habra Heights first appeared as a city in the 1980 United States census in the Whittier and the East San Gabriel Valley census county divisions.

=== Racial and ethnic composition ===
La Habra Heights city, California – Racial and ethnic composition Note: the US Census treats Hispanic/Latino as an ethnic category. This table excludes Latinos from the racial categories and assigns them to a separate category. Hispanics/Latinos may be of any race.
Race / Ethnicity (NH = Non-Hispanic)	Pop 1980	Pop 1990	Pop 2000	Pop 2010	Pop 2020	% 1980	% 1990	% 2000	% 2010	% 2020
White alone (NH)	4,335	5,090	3,635	3,046	2,421	90.58%	81.75%	63.64%	57.20%	42.61%
Black or African American alone (NH)	5	19	66	45	41	0.10%	0.31%	1.16%	0.85%	0.72%
Native American or Alaska Native alone (NH)	64	19	6	5	10	1.34%	0.31%	0.11%	0.09%	0.18%
Asian alone (NH)	129	415	1,042	835	1,150	2.70%	6.67%	18.24%	15.68%	20.24%
Native Hawaiian or Pacific Islander alone (NH)	129	415	4	6	5	2.70%	6.67%	0.07%	0.11%	0.09%
Other race alone (NH)	-	5	14	4	39	-	0.08%	0.25%	0.08%	0.69%
Mixed race or Multiracial (NH)	x	x	166	130	203	x	x	2.91%	2.44%	3.57%
Hispanic or Latino (any race)	253	678	779	1,254	1,813	5.29%	10.89%	13.64%	23.55%	31.91%
Total	4,786	6,226	5,712	5,325	5,682	100.00%	100.00%	100.00%	100.00%	100.00%

=== 2020 census ===
As of the 2020 census, La Habra Heights had a population of 5,682 and a population density of 922.6 inhabitants per square mile (356.2/km^{2}). The census reported that 99.5% of the population lived in households, 0.3% lived in non-institutionalized group quarters, and 0.2% were institutionalized. The city was 100.0% urban and 0.0% rural.

There were 1,921 households, of which 30.8% had children under the age of 18 living in them. Of all households, 65.6% were married-couple households, 3.5% were cohabiting couple households, 17.5% had a female householder with no partner present, and 13.4% had a male householder with no partner present. About 13.0% of households were one person, and 7.8% had one person who was 65 years of age or older. The average household size was 2.94, and there were 1,572 families (81.8% of all households).

The age distribution was 16.8% under the age of 18, 8.1% aged 18 to 24, 20.5% aged 25 to 44, 30.7% aged 45 to 64, and 23.9% who were 65 years of age or older. The median age was 49.4 years. For every 100 females, there were 96.1 males, and for every 100 females age 18 and over there were 95.8 males age 18 and over.

There were 2,022 housing units at an average density of 328.3 units per square mile (126.8 units/km^{2}), of which 1,921 (95.0%) were occupied. Of the occupied units, 88.1% were owner-occupied and 11.9% were occupied by renters. The homeowner vacancy rate was 1.3% and the rental vacancy rate was 0.0%.

=== 2010 census ===
At the 2010 census La Habra Heights had a population of 5,325. The population density was 864.3 inhabitants per square mile (333.7/km^{2}). The racial makeup of La Habra Heights was 3,855 (72.4%) White (57.2% Non-Hispanic White), 47 (0.9%) African American, 26 (0.5%) Native American, 841 (15.8%) Asian, 6 (0.1%) Pacific Islander, 333 (6.3%) from other races, and 217 (4.1%) from two or more races. Hispanic or Latino of any race were 1,254 persons (23.5%).

The census reported that 5,305 people (99.6% of the population) lived in households, 14 (0.3%) lived in non-institutionalized group quarters, and 6 (0.1%) were institutionalized.

There were 1,805 households, of which 542 (30.0%) had children under the age of 18 living in them, 1,289 (71.4%) were opposite-sex married couples living together, 123 (6.8%) had a female householder with no husband present, 79 (4.4%) had a male householder with no wife present. There were 33 (1.8%) unmarried opposite-sex partnerships, and 14 (0.8%) same-sex married couples or partnerships. 253 households (14.0%) were one person and 139 (7.7%) had someone living alone who was 65 or older. The average household size was 2.94. There were 1,491 families (82.6% of households); the average family size was 3.21.

The age distribution was 1,019 people (19.1%) under the age of 18, 470 people (8.8%) aged 18 to 24, 938 people (17.6%) aged 25 to 44, 1,862 people (35.0%) aged 45 to 64, and 1,036 people (19.5%) who were 65 or older. The median age was 47.6 years. For every 100 females, there were 99.1 males. For every 100 females age 18 and over, there were 102.6 males.

There were 1,880 housing units at an average density of 305.1 per square mile, of the occupied units 1,682 (93.2%) were owner-occupied and 123 (6.8%) were rented. The homeowner vacancy rate was 0.5%; the rental vacancy rate was 5.3%. 4,955 people (93.1% of the population) lived in owner-occupied housing units and 350 people (6.6%) lived in rental housing units.

=== Income and poverty ===
During 2009–2013, La Habra Heights had a median household income of $118,871, with 2.8% of the population living below the federal poverty line.

In 2023, the US Census Bureau estimated that the median household income was $186,837, and the per capita income was $95,723. About 2.0% of families and 3.6% of the population were below the poverty line.

== History ==
La Habra Heights is located on the 1839 Rancho La Habra Mexican land grant made to Mariano Reyes Roldan. Roldan sold the rancho to Andres Pico, who sold it to Abel Stearns. In 1900, Willits J. Hole acquired 3,500 acres (14.2 km^{2}), which he sold in 1919 to Edwin G. Hart, who developed La Habra Heights.

=== Rudolph Hass & the Discovery of the Hass Avocado ===
All commercial, fruit-bearing Hass avocado trees have been grown from grafted seedlings propagated from a single tree from a seed bought by Rudolph Hass in 1926 from A. R. Rideout of Whittier, California. At the time, Rideout was getting seeds from any source, even restaurant food scraps. The cultivar this seed came from is not known. In 2019, the National Academy of Sciences published a genetic study concluding that the Hass avocado is a cross between Mexican (61%) and Guatemalan (39%) avocado varieties.

In 1926, at his 1.5-acre grove at 430 West Road, La Habra Heights, California, Hass planted three seeds he had bought from Rideout, which yielded one strong seedling. After trying and failing at least twice to graft the seedling with branches from Fuerte avocado trees (the leading commercial cultivar at the time), Hass thought of cutting it down. Still, a professional grafter named Caulkins told him the young tree was sound and robust, so he let it be. When the tree began bearing odd, bumpy fruit, his children liked the taste. As the tree's yields grew, Hass quickly sold what his family did not eat to co-workers at the post office.[1] The Hass avocado had one of its first commercial successes at the Model Grocery Store on Colorado Street in Pasadena, California, where chefs working for some of the town's wealthy residents bought the new cultivar's big, nutty-tasting fruit for $1 each, a very high price at the time (equivalent to $17 in 2023).

Hass patented the tree in 1935 and contracted with Whittier nurseryman Harold Brokaw to grow and sell grafted seedlings propagated from its cuttings,[1] with Brokaw getting 75% of the proceeds. Brokaw then specialized in the Hass and often sold out of grafted seedlings since, unlike the Fuerte, Hass yields are year-round and plentiful, with giant fruit, a longer shelf life, and richer flavor owing to higher oil content.

By the early 21st century, the US avocado industry took in over $1 billion a year from the heavy-bearing, high-quality Hass cultivar, which accounted for around 80% of all avocados grown worldwide.

Owing to later suburban sprawl in Southern California, the mother tree stood for many years in front of a residence in La Habra Heights. The tree died when it was 76 years old and was cut down on 11 September 2002 after a ten-year fight with phytophthora (root rot), which often kills avocado trees. Two plaques by the private residence at 426 West Road mark where it grew. The wood was stored in a tree nursery, and from this stock, a nephew of Rudolph Hass, Dick Stewart, made keepsakes, jewelry, and other gifts.

From 2010 to 2013, in mid-May, and starting again in September 2018, the city of La Habra Heights celebrated the Hass avocado at its Annual La Habra Heights Avocado Festival.

== Public safety ==
La Habra Heights has a Combination Fire Department that provides 24/7 365 staffing with full-time (Fire Chief, Deputy Chief, administrative assistant, Fire Captains), part-time (Training Chief, EMS Chief, Fire Captains, & Firefighter Paramedics), and volunteer (Firefighters, Driver Operators) employees housed in fire Station behind City Hall on Hacienda Road. The Fire Department staffs a minimum of two Engines daily with Engine 71 Advanced life support (ALS – with paramedics) and a basic life support (BLS) Engine 72 that provide all hazard all risk response for its citizens. The department does charge several hundred dollars per EMS call, or free for those who pay for and are enrolled in the Paramedic subscription program. A contract with Care Ambulance has one dedicated BLS unit stationed at the Fire Station at all times for patient transport. Additionally the Mutual Aid agreement with Los Angeles County Fire lets LHHFD assist the surrounding communities on an as needed basis. There is an Automatic Aid agreement with a portion of the west end of La Habra Heights. Additional firefighting resources can be requested under the Mutual Aid provision of the State of California. La Habra Heights contracts for law enforcement with the Los Angeles County Sheriff's Department's regional station in the City of Industry.

The Los Angeles County Sheriff's Department operates the Industry Station in the City of Industry, serving La Habra Heights.

The Los Angeles County Department of Health Services operates the Whittier Health Center in Whittier, serving La Habra Heights.

== Government ==
La Habra Heights elects a City Council every four years. One of those City Council members is voted in as Mayor by the Council each year. As of 2025, the council consists of Mayor John Pespisa, Mayor Pro Tempore Carol Engelhardt, council members Brian Bergman, Greg Stefflre, and Norm Zezula.

In the California State Legislature, La Habra Heights is in the 30th senatorial district, represented by Democrat Bob Archuleta, and in the 56th Assembly district, represented by Democrat Lisa Calderon.

In the United States House of Representatives, La Habra Heights is in California's 38th congressional district, represented by Democrat Linda Sánchez.

== Education ==
There are no schools within the La Habra Heights city limits. Students are served by Lowell Joint School District, La Habra City School District and the Fullerton Joint Union High School District, a small portion of the city next to the city of Whittier off west road is zoned to Whittier Union High School District and East Whittier City School District. Students who live west of Hacienda Boulevard are directed to El Portal and Macy Elementary Schools (both in La Habra) and Rancho-Starbuck Intermediate School (in unincorporated East Whittier). Students who live east of Hacienda Boulevard and the small unincorporated section of Los Angeles County north of Arbolita Drive are directed to Walnut, Ladera Vista, El Cerrito and Arbolita Elementary Schools (all in La Habra) and Washington Middle School (in La Habra). Most students who live in La Habra Heights are directed to La Habra High School and Sonora High School (both in La Habra), though a small portion of homes off West Road are zoned to schools in the city of Whittier, which includes La Serna High School, Granada Middle School (in unincorporated East Whittier), and Murphy Ranch Elementary school. Students who live near the border of Hacienda Heights attend schools in the Hacienda La Puente Unified School District.

== Parks and recreation ==
The community has one park, "The Park", located on Hacienda Road, which is the center of community events. The city of La Habra Heights hosts the annual Avocado Festival. Community organizations such as The La Habra Heights Improvement Association host Music in the Park, Halloween Haunt, Breakfast with Santa, and the Easter Egg Hunt for the community. Highland Riders hosts equestrian sport and educational activities. There is a gymnasium for basketball, volleyball, and a stage. Also, a horse riding arena and practice corral. The Park offers a playground for children, a gazebo, and picnic tables.

== Newspapers and news organizations ==
- Whittier Daily News
- Heights Life
- LA Times

== Notable people ==
- Conner Bevans (b. 1994) – soccer player
- Rudolph Hass (1892–1952) – creator of the Hass avocado
- Morgan Hentzen (b. 1985) – swimmer
- Cathy Rigby (b. 1952) – actress and gymnast
- Josh Staumont (b. 1993) – MLB pitcher
- Alex Villanueva (b. 1963) – sheriff of Los Angeles County
