= Darin Toohey =

AMERICAN ATMOSPHERIC SCIENTIST

- Born: Darin Wesley Toohey
- Education: La Habra High School; California State University, Fullerton; Harvard University
- Awards: NASA Group Achievement Award (1989, 1993, 2001, 2007); NSF Young Investigator Award (1992); Antarctica Service Medal (1999); UNEP Recognition of Ozone Secretariat (2012)
- Scientific career
- Fields: Aerosol science; atmospheric chemistry; atmospheric physics
- Workplaces: Harvard University; University of California, Irvine; University of Colorado Boulder

Darin W. Toohey is an American atmospheric scientist. He is a professor of atmospheric and oceanic sciences and of environmental studies at the University of Colorado Boulder since 1999. Toohey's research addresses the role of trace gases and aerosols on Earth's climate, atmospheric oxidation, and air quality. He was a Jefferson Science Fellow at the United States Department of State, 2011-2012.

== Career ==
Toohey received a B.S. in chemistry and a B.A. in physics at California State University, Fullerton in 1982 and a Ph.D. in applied physics at Harvard University in 1988. He was a postdoctoral fellow in applied physics under Professor James G. Anderson at Harvard, 1988-1991. In 1991 he joined the Department of Earth System Science at the University of California Irvine, which he helped establish and served as assistant and associate professor from 1991 until 1998. The following year he joined the University of Colorado Boulder as an associate professor, achieving full professor in 2004. At Colorado, Toohey has been a director of the Baker Residential Academic Program, interim director of the Sustainability and Social Innovation Residential Academic Program, and director of the Global Studies Residential Academic Program.

=== Research ===
His research addresses the chemistry and dynamics of Earth's atmosphere, with particular emphasis on observations of trace gases and aerosols and their impact on stratospheric ozone, the oxidative capacity of the atmosphere, and radiation balance. His group studies stratospheric ozone depletion over the Arctic, the impact of rockets on stratospheric chemistry, long-range transport of pollutants, and the role of aerosols in modification of cloud properties. He has participated in over forty field campaigns, most involving research aircraft and scientific balloons. They have conducted work in Antarctica, Spitsbergen, New Zealand, Sweden, Nepal, the Virgin Islands, Alaska, Hawaii, and throughout the continental United States. He develops instruments for fast-response in situ measurements from the ground, balloons, and aircraft. His work helped demonstrate the link between chlorine-containing and bromine-containing compounds on the destruction of ozone over the Arctic and Antarctic.
