= Derrick Coleman (American football) =

American football player (born 1990)

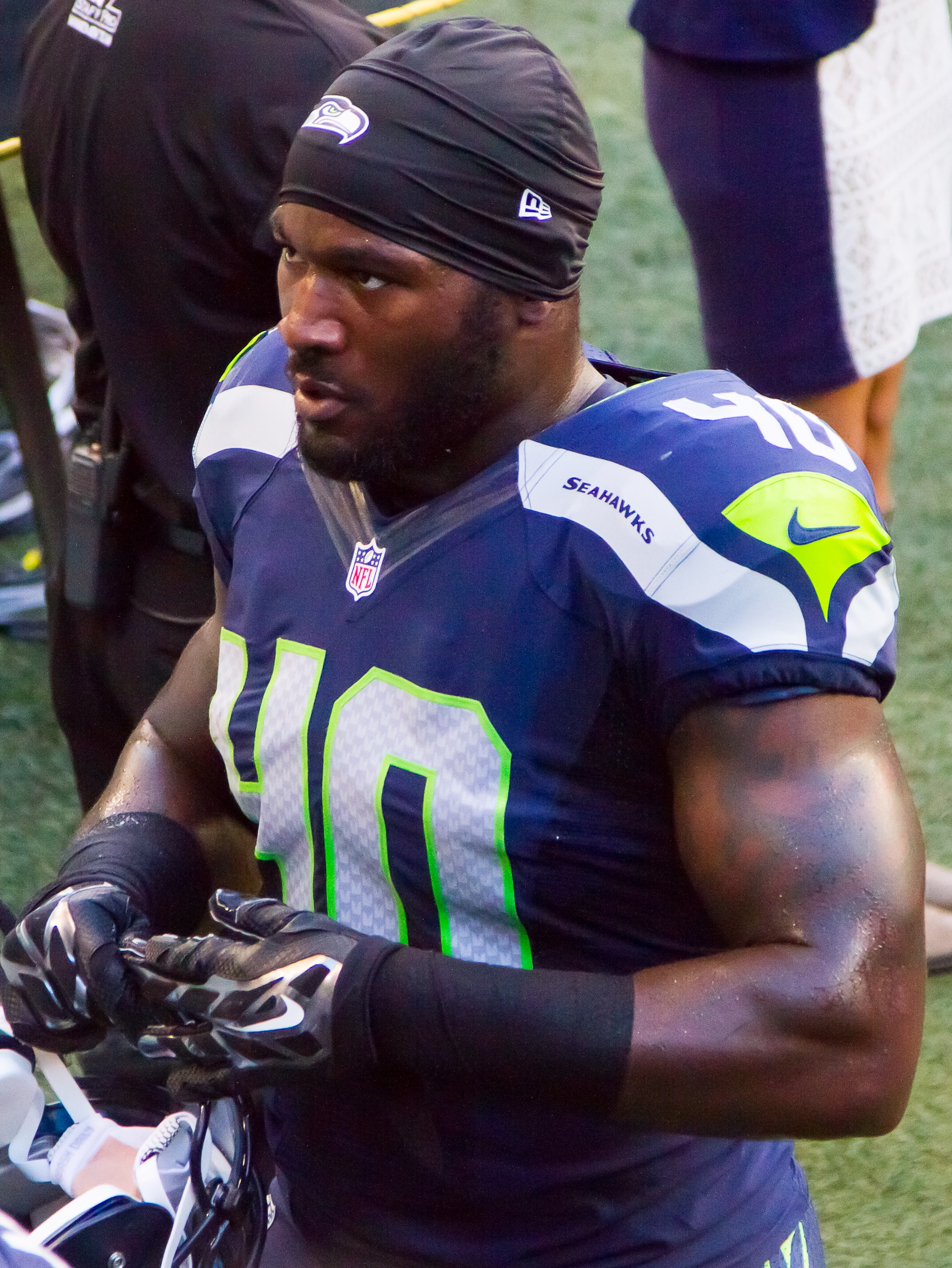
- Coleman with the Seattle Seahawks in 2015

Green Bay Packers
- Title: Assistant to player engagement

Personal information
- Born: October 18, 1990 (age 36); Los Angeles, California, U.S.
- Listed height: 6 ft 0 in (1.83 m)
- Listed weight: 233 lb (106 kg)

Career information
- High school: Troy (Fullerton, California)
- College: UCLA
- NFL draft: 2012: undrafted

Career history

Playing
- Minnesota Vikings (2012)*; Seattle Seahawks (2012–2015); Atlanta Falcons (2017); Arizona Cardinals (2018)
- * Offseason or practice squad member only

Operations
- Green Bay Packers (2023–present) Assistant to player engagement

Awards and highlights
- Super Bowl champion (XLVIII); Second-team All-Pac-12 (2011)

Career NFL statistics
- Rushing yards: 46
- Receptions: 15
- Receiving yards: 128
- Receiving touchdowns: 2
- Stats at Pro Football Reference

Derrick Lamont Coleman (born on October 18, 1990) is an American former professional football fullback who is an assistant to player engagement for the Green Bay Packers of the National Football League (NFL). He played college football for the UCLA Bruins and was signed as an undrafted free agent by the Minnesota Vikings in 2012.

== Early life ==
Coleman became deaf when he was three years old; he primarily uses lip reading for communication. He attended Troy High School in Fullerton, California, and played college football at the University of California, Los Angeles, for the Bruins.

== Playing career ==
=== Minnesota Vikings ===
Coleman went undrafted, then signed as an undrafted free agent with the Minnesota Vikings on April 28, 2012. He was waived by the Vikings in August.

=== Seattle Seahawks ===
Coleman was signed by the Seattle Seahawks in December 2012. He made the 2013 season cut after the fourth preseason game and thus was added to the 53-man roster. In week one's game between the Seahawks and the Carolina Panthers, Coleman had three catches for 30 yards. Coleman scored his first NFL touchdown on December 2, 2013, against the New Orleans Saints off of a ricocheted ball from Kellen Davis. Coleman was a part of the Seahawks Super Bowl XLVIII championship team. On October 15, 2015, Coleman was suspended indefinitely after an arrest on hit-and-run charges, but the suspension was lifted on October 19, after a team investigation.

=== Atlanta Falcons ===
On March 21, 2017, Coleman signed with the Atlanta Falcons. On September 10, he made his Falcons debut in the 23–17 victory over the Chicago Bears.

=== Arizona Cardinals ===
On May 9, 2018, Coleman signed with the Arizona Cardinals.

On November 19, 2020, the Las Vegas Raiders hosted Coleman for a workout.

== Executive career ==
On April 18, 2023, Coleman was hired by the Green Bay Packers as assistant to player engagement, serving under Grey Ruegamer.

== Personal life ==
Coleman is a Christian.

In January 2014, Coleman was featured in a widely praised commercial for Duracell batteries. The commercial inspired twin sisters Riley and Erin Kovalcik, who also wear hearing aids, to write him a letter of support. After exchanging letters, Coleman and Duracell decided to invite the Kovalcik family to watch the Super Bowl XLVIII in person on February 2, 2014.

On October 15, 2015, Coleman was reportedly driving his Dodge Ram erratically in Bellevue, Washington. It is alleged that Coleman fled the scene on foot but was spotted and detained by police within 10 minutes. Police reported that Coleman claimed to have smoked spice, a synthetic form of marijuana, about an hour prior to the incident. On October 6, 2016, he pled guilty to vehicular assault and hit-and-run charges. On October 15, 2016, he was ordered to carry out 240 hours of community service and was required to be under community supervision for 12 months. Under the agreement, he was also required to pay the victim restitution and property damages. In the NFL, Coleman served a four-game suspension which commenced on October 14, 2016.
