= Troy High School (California) =

Public high school in Fullerton, California, United States

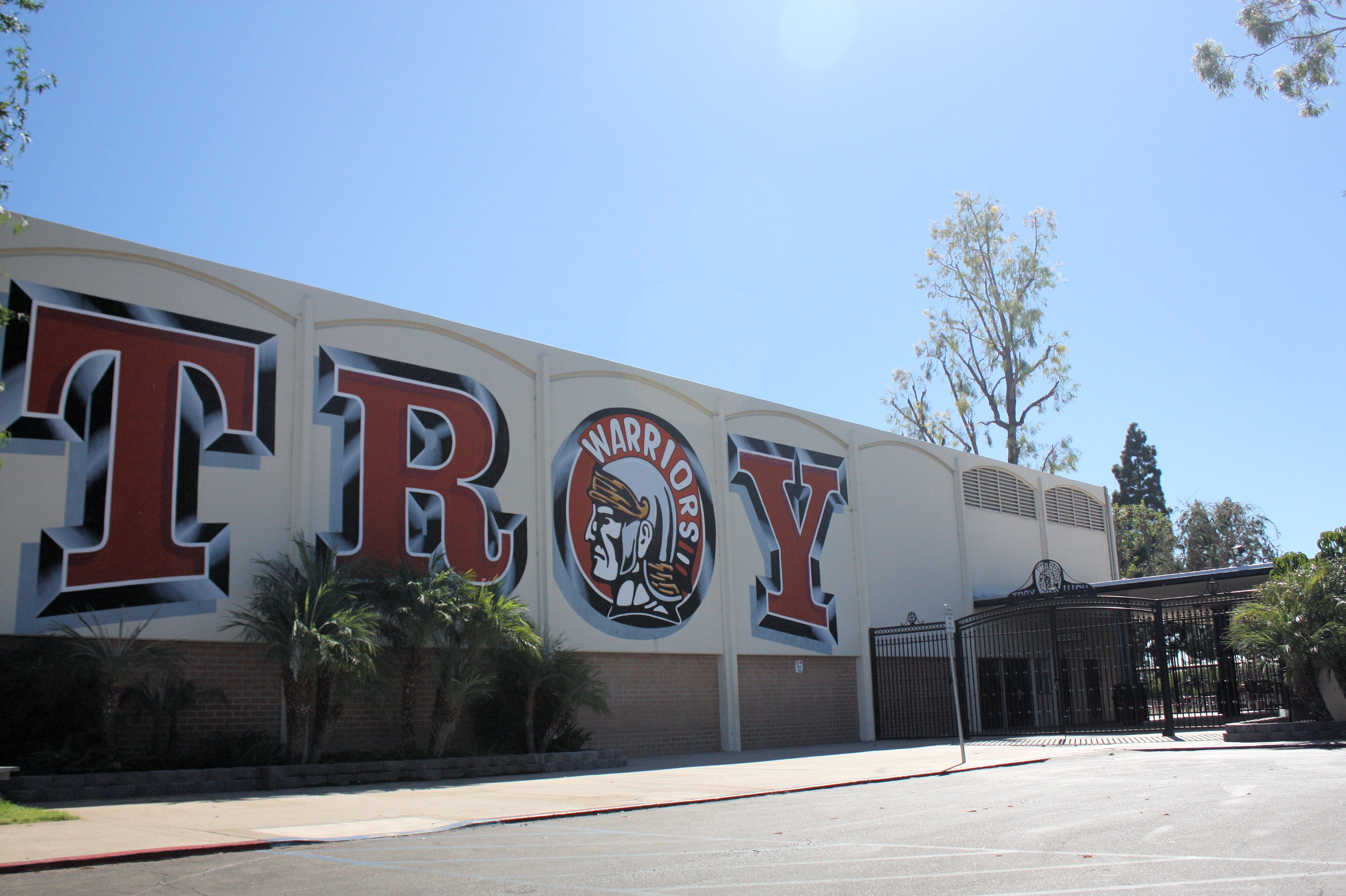

Location
- 2200 East Dorothy Lane; Fullerton, California 92831; United States; 33°52′53″N 117°53′34″W

Information
- Established: 1964; 62 years ago
- School district: Fullerton Joint Union High School District
- Superintendent: Scott Scambray
- CEEB code: 051009
- Principal: William Mynster
- Teaching staff: 108.13 (FTE)
- Grades: 9–12
- Enrollment: 2,504 (2024–2025)
- Student to teacher ratio: 23.16
- Campus type: Suburban
- Colors: Red, Black, and White
- Mascot: Warriors
- Rival: Sunny Hills Lancers
- Accreditation: Western Association of Schools and Colleges
- USNWR ranking: 213 (2020)
- Newspaper: The Oracle
- Yearbook: Ilium
- Website: troyhigh.com

Troy High School is a public high school in Fullerton, California. It is acclaimed for its many programs including the flagship Troy Tech program, along with the Cambridge Diploma and International Baccalaureate. The school is part of the Fullerton Joint Union High School District. As of the 2024–25 school year, 2,504 students attend the school. The school is located next to the continuing La Vista High School and California State University, Fullerton.

== Academics ==
In the late 1980s and early 1990s, then-principal Jerry Atkin was instrumental in developing and implementing a Science and Technology magnet program, known as Troy Tech, for Troy High School. This program involves technology pathways with specialized courses as well as an internship students must complete the summer after junior year. Troy was one of 27 high schools nationwide honored as a New American High School by former U.S. President Bill Clinton in 2000. It has won first place in the U.S. National Science Olympiad in 1996, 1999, 2000, 2002, 2003, 2006, 2007, 2008, 2014, 2015, 2017, 2018 and 2019 and has also placed favorably in many other competitions on both the regional and national level, including the American Computer Science League (1st in the nation, 5th overall in 2005). Troy's Science Olympiad team has consistently attended nationals every year since 1994 except for 1995, and they have placed in the top 5 at nationals every year they have attended. Troy's Science Bowl Team has placed first and second for four years in the Western Regional Science Bowl sponsored by NASA/JPL and the U.S. Department of Energy. In 2001, the team captured the national second place at the U.S. Dept. of Energy Competition in Washington, D.C.

In 2008, the Western Association of Schools and Colleges granted the school a six-year accreditation.

== Athletics ==
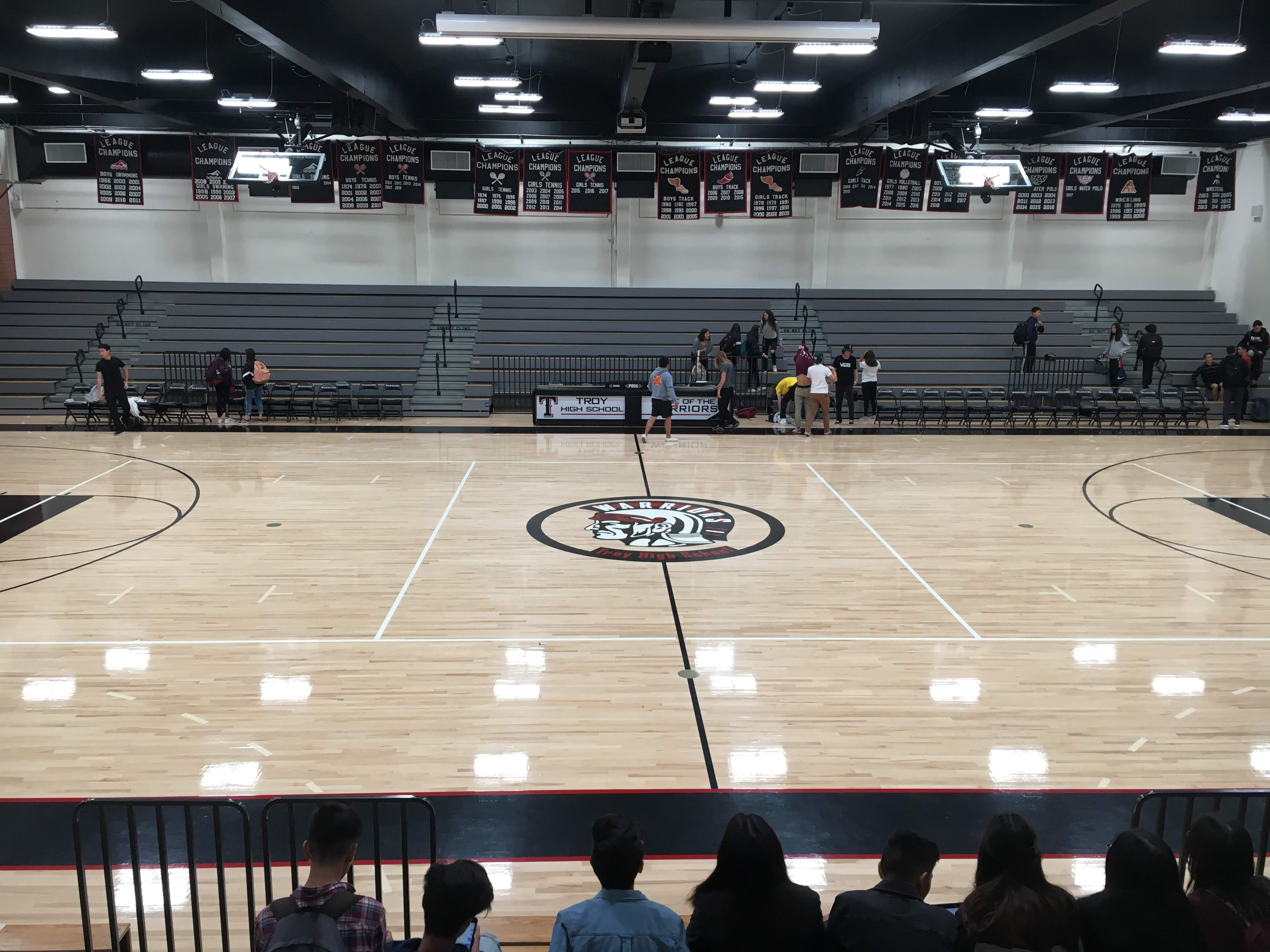
Inside the school's North Gym.

=== Basketball ===
Sports Illustrated ranked the team the #4 program in the country for 2006, and the Los Angeles Times ranked Troy the #5 program in all of Southern California for the second year in a row. In 2017 Kianna Smith was named as a McDonald's All American athlete. This is the first time anyone in the program has won the award.

=== Girls' Volleyball ===
The girls' volleyball team won the state title in 2012.

=== Girls' Water Polo ===
The Girls' Water Polo team won the CIF Division IV Title in 2013. The Warriors became just the second Freeway League team to capture a CIF girls' water polo title. Coach Jason Wilson received State Coach of the Year following their win.

== Journalism ==
=== Oracle ===
Troy's school newspaper is the Oracle, which was awarded the George H. Gallup Award in the Quill and Scroll International Honor Society News Media Evaluation Service in 2012 and 2014. A number of individual writers have also received honors in competitions such as Orange County Journalism Education Association (OCJEA).

== Standardized testing statistics ==
=== SAT ===
SAT I: Reasoning Test
Section	Mean Score
Total	1335
Evidenced-Based Reading and Writing	651
Math	685
Based on 2019–2020 records.

SAT II: Subject Tests
Section	Mean Score
Math Level 2	745
United States History	701
Chemistry	715
Physics	720
Biology E	706
Biology M	719
Chinese w/L	757
Literature	653
2018 Cohort Mean scores

== Student body ==
The following are details and statistics about Troy High School's student body:

=== Class ===
Troy High School has a total enrollment of 2,584 students.

=== Demographics ===
White	Latino	Asian	African American	Native American	Two or More Races
14.7%	25.8%	50.1%	1.9%	0.47%	10.1%

According to U.S. News & World Report, 86% of students enrolled at Troy High School come from minority backgrounds with 29% of the student body coming from economically disadvantaged households, determined by student eligibility for California's Reduced-price meal program.

Males make up 51% of the student body and females make up 49% of the student body.

=== College attendance ===
As of 2019, 99% of Troy High School students attend colleges and universities. Of those, 75% attend 4 year universities and colleges and 24% 2 year colleges.

== Notable alumni ==
- Aaron Brewer, long snapper for the Arizona Cardinals
- Adam Cadre, writer
- Marc Cherry, creator of ABC's Desperate Housewives
- Derrick Coleman, fullback who last played for the Arizona Cardinals
- Dennis Danell, former guitarist in Social Distortion
- Courtney Halverson, actress best known for Unfriended
- Chris Hebert, class of 1991; former child actor (The Last Starfighter)
- Kianna Smith, guard who played for the Louisville Cardinals and the Los Angeles Sparks
- Tae Ha Kim (Taeha Types), internet personality and Twitch streamer
- Otto Kemp, professional baseball player
- Brent Liles, former bass player for Social Distortion and Agent Orange (band)
- Mike Ness, founder and singer of the punk rock band, Social Distortion
- Alyson Noël, author, known for The Immortals (books)
- Tam O'Shaughnessy, former professional tennis player and co-founder of Sally Ride Science
- Eugene "Pobelter" Park, (class of 2014) professional League of Legends player for Counter Logic Gaming
- Miguel A. Pulido, (class of 1974) mayor of Santa Ana, California from 1994 to 2020
- Steve Trachsel, former professional baseball player
