= La Habra, California =

City in California, United States

- City
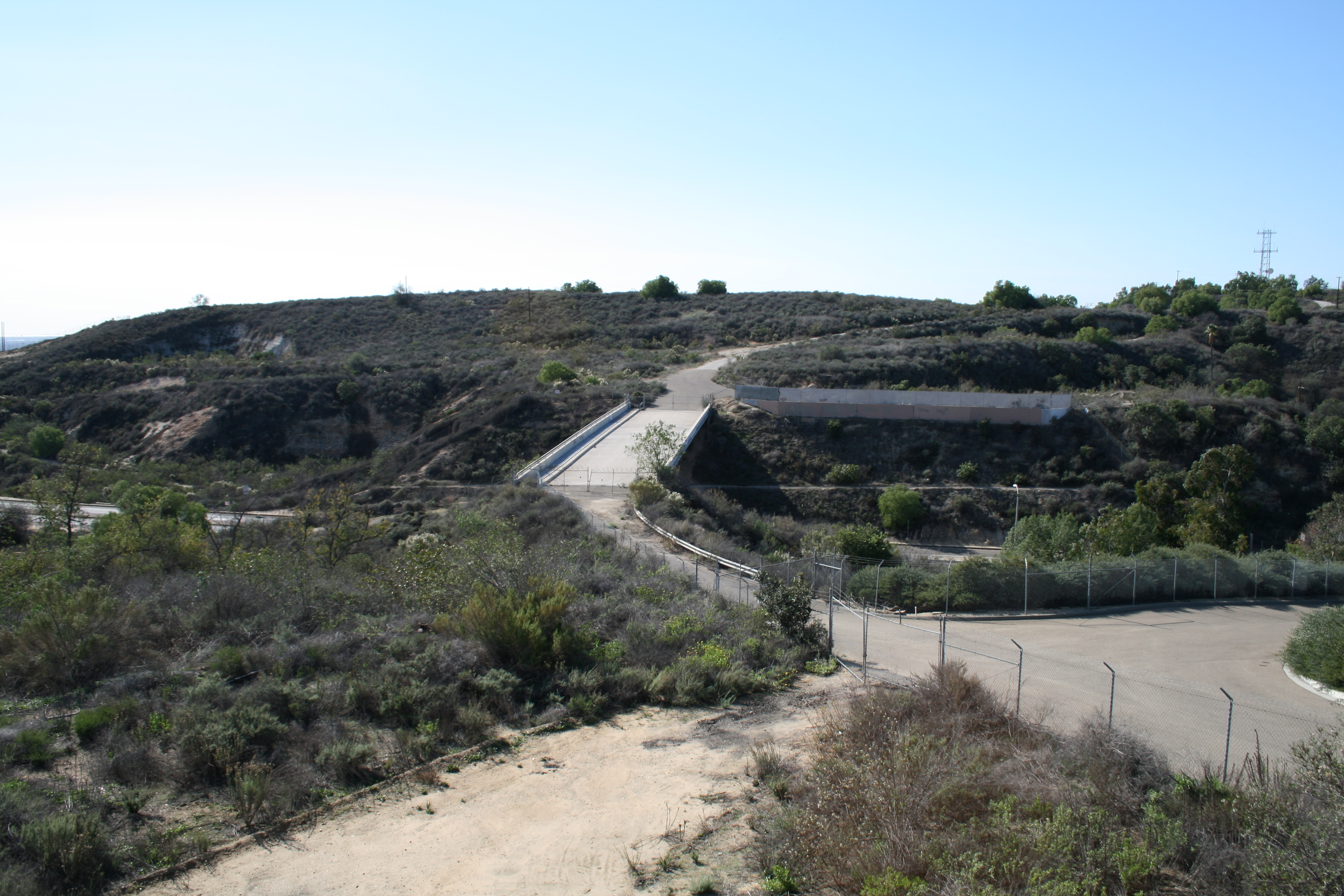
- Bridge over Idaho Street

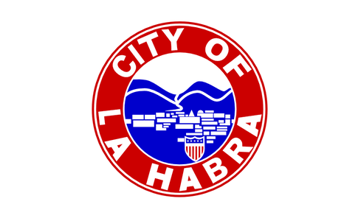
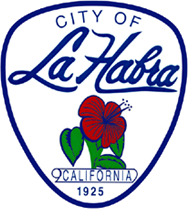
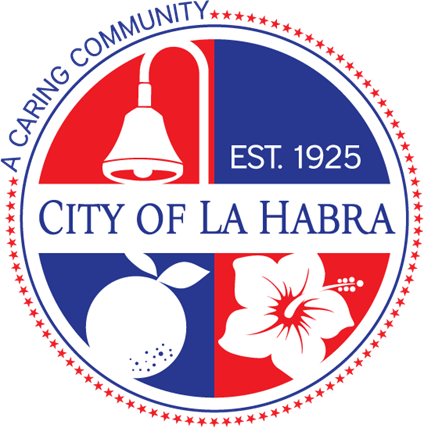
- Flag Seal Logo
- Motto: "A Caring Community"
- Interactive map of La Habra, California
- Location in the United States
- Coordinates: 33°55′55″N 117°56′46″W
- Country: United States
- State: California
- County: Orange
- Incorporated: January 20, 1925
- Named for: Rancho La Habra

Government
  - Type: Council-Manager
  - Mayor: Rose Espinoza
  - Mayor Pro Tem: Jose Medrano
  - City Council: James Gomez; Daren Nigsarian; Delwin Lampkin
  - City Manager: Jim Sadro

Area
  - Total: 7.56 sq mi (19.59 km^{2})
  - Land: 7.56 sq mi (19.58 km^{2})
  - Water: 0.0077 sq mi (0.02 km^{2}) 0.08%
- Elevation: 299 ft (91 m)

Population (2020)
  - Total: 63,097
  - Density: 8,346.3/sq mi (3,222.52/km^{2})
- Time zone: UTC−8 (Pacific)
  - Summer (DST): UTC−7 (PDT)
- ZIP Codes: 90631–90633
- Area code: 562
- FIPS code: 06-39290
- GNIS feature IDs: 1652735, 2411571
- Website: www.lahabraca.gov

La Habra (luh HAH-bruh; archaic spelling of la abra, Spanish for 'the opening') is a city in the northwestern corner of Orange County, California, United States. In the 2020 census, the city had a population of 63,097.

== History ==
=== Origin of name ===
The name referred to the "Pass Through the Hills," the natural pass through the hills to the north first discovered and used by Spanish explorers of the Portola expedition on July 30, 1769.

In 1839, when the area was part of Alta California, vast herds of cattle and horses grazed over the hills and valleys of Southern California. Mariano Reyes Roldan was granted 6,698 acres (27 km^{2}) in that year and named his land Rancho Cañada de La Habra. In the 1860s, Abel Stearns purchased Rancho La Habra.

=== Historical information ===
La Habra was founded in 1896. The first post office in the town was established in 1898 in a corner of Coy's Store at Central (now La Habra Boulevard) and Euclid Street.

The city was incorporated under general law on January 20, 1925, with a population of 3,000. The police force was organized in 1926 and employed a chief, traffic officer and patrolman. By 1928, the city was the largest avocado center in Southern California. In 1930, the first fire department building was constructed followed by the original City Hall in 1935. By 1950, the population reached nearly 5,000. The Civic Center took shape when the existing County Library was dedicated in 1966, followed by the present administration building in 1969.

For more than 70 years, La Habra was known as the city just south of La Habra Heights, where the 'Hass' avocado, of the 'Hass' avocado mother tree, was planted by Rudolph Hass in the 1920s. The fruit from this tree has since become one of the most popular avocado cultivars worldwide. The 'Hass' mother tree succumbed to root rot in 2002.

The La Habra Stakes, run since 1973 at the Santa Anita Park Thoroughbred race track, is named for La Habra.

The city contracts with the Los Angeles County Fire Department for EMS and fire protection.

Law enforcement is provided by the La Habra Police Department, which in 2008 employed about 70 officers. From 2004 to 2008, they ranked third in the number of officer-involved shootings among twenty Orange County municipal police departments. One case among these, the 2007 death of Michael Cho, resulted in a wrongful death lawsuit against the city which was settled in September 2010 for $250,000.

A shopping plaza and post office were built in the 1970s on the site of a lake built by a rancher with Monkey Island where he let feral monkeys roam.

== Geography ==
According to the United States Census Bureau, the city has a total area of 7.6 square miles (20 km^{2}), with 0.08% covered by water.

It is bordered by La Habra Heights on the north, Brea on the east, Fullerton on the south and southeast, La Mirada on the west and southwest, East Whittier on the west, Whittier on the northwest, and a small unnamed section of unincorporated Los Angeles County on the northeast.

=== Climate ===
According to the Köppen climate classification, La Habra has a hot-summer Mediterranean climate, Csa on climate maps.

Climate data for La Habra
Month	Jan	Feb	Mar	Apr	May	Jun	Jul	Aug	Sep	Oct	Nov	Dec	Year
Mean daily maximum °C (°F)	18.3 (64.9)	18.4 (65.1)	20.0 (68.0)	21.8 (71.2)	23.6 (74.5)	26.4 (79.5)	29.6 (85.3)	30.3 (86.5)	29.3 (84.7)	25.6 (78.1)	21.8 (71.2)	17.7 (63.9)	23.6 (74.4)
Daily mean °C (°F)	12.5 (54.5)	12.8 (55.0)	14.4 (57.9)	16.1 (61.0)	18.0 (64.4)	20.5 (68.9)	23.2 (73.8)	23.6 (74.5)	22.7 (72.9)	19.3 (66.7)	15.5 (59.9)	12.2 (54.0)	17.6 (63.6)
Mean daily minimum °C (°F)	7.8 (46.0)	8.1 (46.6)	9.7 (49.5)	11.2 (52.2)	13.5 (56.3)	15.8 (60.4)	18.3 (64.9)	18.6 (65.5)	17.7 (63.9)	14.5 (58.1)	10.7 (51.3)	7.7 (45.9)	12.8 (55.0)
Average precipitation mm (inches)	44.5 (1.75)	49.7 (1.96)	25.9 (1.02)	12.3 (0.48)	6.8 (0.27)	1.8 (0.07)	1.9 (0.07)	2.1 (0.08)	3.7 (0.15)	9.5 (0.37)	14.1 (0.56)	36.2 (1.43)	208.5 (8.21)
Source: Weather.Directory

== Demographics ==
Historical population
Census	Pop.	Note	%±
1930	2,273		—
1940	2,499		9.9%
1950	4,961		98.5%
1960	25,136		406.7%
1970	41,350		64.5%
1980	45,232		9.4%
1990	51,266		13.3%
2000	58,974		15.0%
2010	60,239		2.1%
2020	63,097		4.7%
U.S. Decennial Census; 1860–1870 1880-1890; 1900 1910 1920; 1930 1940 1950; 1960 1970 1980; 1990 2000 2010; 2020

La Habra first appeared as a city in the 1930 U.S. Census. Prior to 1930, the area was part of Brea Township (pop 2,515 in 1920).

=== Racial and ethnic composition ===
La Habra city, California – Racial and ethnic composition Note: the US Census treats Hispanic/Latino as an ethnic category. This table excludes Latinos from the racial categories and assigns them to a separate category. Hispanics/Latinos may be of any race.
Race / Ethnicity (NH = Non-Hispanic)	Pop 1980	Pop 1990	Pop 2000	Pop 2010	Pop 2020	% 1980	% 1990	% 2000	% 2010	% 2020
White alone (NH)	33,844	31,210	24,399	18,178	14,953	74.82%	60.88%	41.37%	30.18%	23.70%
Black or African American alone (NH)	179	428	808	836	1,047	0.40%	0.83%	1.37%	1.39%	1.66%
Native American or Alaska Native alone (NH)	240	209	188	148	143	0.53%	0.41%	0.32%	0.25%	0.23%
Asian alone (NH)	807	1,957	3,432	5,501	7,802	1.78%	3.82%	5.82%	9.13%	12.37%
Native Hawaiian or Pacific Islander alone (NH)	807	1,957	89	80	60	1.78%	3.82%	0.15%	0.13%	0.10%
Other race alone (NH)	108	67	95	88	254	0.24%	0.13%	0.16%	0.15%	0.40%
Mixed race or Multiracial (NH)	x	x	1,041	959	1,399	x	x	1.77%	1.59%	2.22%
Hispanic or Latino (any race)	10,054	17,395	28,922	34,449	37,439	22.23%	33.93%	49.04%	57.19%	59.34%
Total	45,232	51,266	58,974	60,239	63,097	100.00%	100.00%	100.00%	100.00%	100.00%

=== 2020 census ===
As of the 2020 census, La Habra had a population of 63,097 and a population density of 8,347.3 inhabitants per square mile (3,222.9/km^{2}). The median age was 37.5 years; 22.5% of residents were under the age of 18, 9.5% were aged 18 to 24, 28.1% were aged 25 to 44, 25.7% were aged 45 to 64, and 14.1% were 65 years of age or older. For every 100 females, there were 94.9 males, and for every 100 females age 18 and over, there were 92.9 males age 18 and over.

The census reported that 98.9% of the population lived in households, 0.8% lived in non-institutionalized group quarters, and 0.3% were institutionalized. The city was 100.0% urban and 0.0% rural.

There were 20,245 households, of which 37.5% had children under the age of 18 living in them. Of all households, 51.8% were married-couple households, 6.6% were cohabiting couple households, 15.6% were households with a male householder and no spouse or partner present, and 25.9% were households with a female householder and no spouse or partner present. About 17.5% of households were one person, and 7.5% had someone living alone who was 65 years of age or older. The average household size was 3.08, and there were 15,489 families (76.5% of all households).

There were 20,801 housing units at an average density of 2,751.8 units per square mile (1,062.5 units/km^{2}), of which 97.3% were occupied. Of occupied housing units, 56.8% were owner-occupied and 43.2% were occupied by renters. The homeowner vacancy rate was 0.6%, and the rental vacancy rate was 3.3%.

=== 2023 ACS estimates ===
In 2023, the US Census Bureau estimated that the median household income was $98,158, and the per capita income was $40,009. About 7.1% of families and 9.7% of the population were below the poverty line.

=== 2010 census ===
At the 2010 census, La Habra had a population of 60,239. The population density was 8,166.8/sq mi (3,153.2/km^{2}). The racial makeup of La Habra was 35,147 (58.3%) White (30.2% non-Hispanic White), 1,025 (1.7%) African American, 531 (0.9%) Native American, 5,653 (9.4%) Asian, 103 (0.2%) Pacific Islander, 15,224 (25.3%) from other races, and 2,556 (4.2%) from two or more races. There were 34,449 Hispanic or Latino residents of any race (57.2%).

The census reported that 59,899 people (99.4% of the population) lived in households, 169 (0.3%) lived in noninstitutionalized group quarters, and 171 (0.3%) were institutionalized.

Of the 18,977 households, 7,937 (41.8%) had children under 18 living in them, 10,078 (53.1%) were opposite-sex married couples living together, 2,905 (15.3%) had a female householder with no husband present, 1,327 (7.0%) had a male householder with no wife present, 1,158 (6.1%) were unmarried opposite-sex partnerships, and 119 (0.6%) were same-sex married couples or partnerships; 3,651 households (19.2%) were one person and 1,440 (7.6%) had someone living alone who was 65 or older. The average household size was 3.16. There were 14,310 families (75.4% of households); the average family size was 3.58.

The age distribution was 16,062 people (26.7%) under 18, 6,353 people (10.5%) 18 to 24, 17,349 (28.8%) 25 to 44, 13,926 people (23.1%) 45 to 64, and 6,549 people (10.9%) who were 65 or older. The median age was 33.6 years. For every 100 females, there were 97.0 males. For every 100 females 18 and over, there were 94.0 males.

The 19,924 housing units had an average density of 2,701.2 per square mile, of the occupied units 10,941 (57.7%) were owner-occupied and 8,036 (42.3%) were rented. The homeowner vacancy rate was 1.5%; the rental vacancy rate was 6.2%. About 33,609 people (55.8% of the population) lived in owner-occupied housing units, and 26,290 people (43.6%) lived in rental housing units.

According to the 2010 United States Census, La Habra had a median household income of $60,954, with 14.0% of the population living below the federal poverty line.

== Economy ==
=== Top employers ===
According to the city's 2023 Annual Comprehensive Financial Report, the top employers in the city are:

#	Employer	# of employees
1	CVS Pharmacy	828
2	Wal-Mart	735
3	Wolverine Fence Co., Inc	500
4	City of La Habra	358
5	Costco	348
6	Target	262
7	Advance Fire Protection Co Inc	249
8	Amazon Fresh	226
9	Northgate Market	186
10	The Kroger Co./La Habra Bakery	185

== Government ==
La Habra's mayor is rotated among current city council members. The mayor for 2025/2026 is Jose Medrano. Current council members include Mayor Pro-Tem James Gomez, Daren Nigsarian and Delwin Lampkin.

In the California State Legislature, La Habra is in the 34th senatorial district, represented by Democrat Tom Umberg, and in the 64th Assembly district, represented by Democrat Blanca Pacheco.

In the United States House of Representatives, La Habra is in California's 38th congressional district, represented by Democrat Linda Sánchez.

=== Politics ===
According to the California secretary of state, as of October 22, 2018, La Habra has 27,439 registered voters. Of those, 10,369 (37.79%) were registered Democrats, 8,745 (31.87%) were registered Republicans, and 7,150 (26.06%) have declined to state a political party/are independents.

La Habra city vote by party in presidential elections
Year	Democratic	Republican	Third Parties
2024	50.80% 12,308	46.57% 11,283	2.64% 639
2020	56.33% 15,409	41.47% 11,343	2.20% 602
2016	53.40% 10,865	39.56% 8,048	7.04% 1,433
2012	49.43% 9,149	48.23% 8,926	2.34% 433
2008	49.38% 9,503	48.60% 9,353	2.02% 389
2004	41.10% 7,254	57.81% 10,204	1.09% 193
2000	43.25% 7,312	53.03% 8,964	3.72% 629
1996	40.30% 6,284	49.08% 7,654	10.63% 1,657
1992	33.25% 6,178	43.78% 8,135	22.98% 4,270
1988	33.17% 5,664	65.86% 11,247	0.97% 165
1984	25.54% 4,594	73.56% 13,232	0.90% 161
1980	25.38% 4,357	66.41% 11,399	8.21% 1,409
1976	37.83% 5,959	60.79% 9,575	1.38% 218

== Education ==
The city of La Habra is mainly served by the La Habra City School District for elementary and middle-school students and the Fullerton Joint Union High School District for high-school students, but portions of La Habra are also redirected to other school districts closer to homes of some residents.

Public schools:

- La Habra City School District
- Brea Olinda Unified School District
- Fullerton School District
- Lowell Joint School District
- Fullerton Joint Union High School District
  - Sonora High School
  - La Habra High School

Private schools:

- Whittier Christian High School

== Transportation ==
Though La Habra has no freeways and three California state highways; SR 39 (covers Whittier and Beach Boulevards), SR 90 (Imperial Highway), and SR 72 (Whittier Boulevard) serve the city. The four major thoroughfares include Whittier Boulevard, Beach Boulevard, Imperial Highway, and Harbor Boulevard. Idaho Street, Euclid Street, and Palm Street are local north–south arterials and La Habra Boulevard and Lambert Road are local west–east arterials.

== Notable people ==
- Rusty Anderson - a guitarist, singer, songwriter and music producer, was born and raised in La Habra.
- Librado Andrade - a Mexican boxer in the super middleweight division and older brother of Enrique, was raised in La Habra.
- Brent Boyd - a graduate of Lowell HS 1975, played football at UCLA, Minnesota Vikings 1980–86, considered the "father of concussion awareness"
- Boyd Coddington - hot rod builder
- Cathy Cooper - stylist, artist, model
- Jack Cooper - composer, arranger, woodwind player
- Jeanette Dimech - Spanish singer
- Jesse Sandoval Flores - a Major League Baseball pitcher (1942–50), played for the Chicago Cubs, Philadelphia Athletics, and Cleveland Indians.
- The Funeral Pyre - Blackened death metal band
- Greg Gaines- LA Rams Super Bowl LVI-winning NFL player
- Natalie Golda - water polo player, Olympian
- Jennifer Hanson - country music singer
- Jenna Haze - adult film actress
- Ronnie Hillman - NFL running back
- William Hodgman - lawyer and prosecutor known for his work in the O. J. Simpson murder case
- Daniel Hoffman - musician, film producer
- Mark Kostabi - modern artist and composer
- John N. Lotz - Air National Guard brigadier general
- Ann Meyers - basketball player, Olympian, first player to be part of the U.S. National team while still in high school
- Dave Meyers - basketball player, two-time NCAA Champion teams at UCLA, played for Milwaukee Bucks 1975–80
- Margarita McCoy - urban planner
- Alan Newman - Major League Baseball (MLB) player
- Richard Nixon - U.S. president, opened a law office in La Habra in 1938
- Aaron Nagao - NCAA All-American for University of Minnesota, on an NCAA national championship team for Penn State University, U23 5th place at world freestyle championships. IBJJF (jiu jitsu) world champion.

https://nittanysportsnow.com/2024/03/from-the-garage-to-penn-state-aaron-nagao-looking-to-build-wrestling-legacy-at-national-championships/

- Enrique Ornelas - Mexican boxer in the middleweight division and younger brother of Librado; raised in La Habra.
- Anne Ramsay - actress
- Cruz Reynoso - first Latino Justice on California Supreme Court
- Bubby Rossman - MLB pitcher for the Philadelphia Phillies
- Kenneth Senne - electrical engineer
- Josh Staumont - MLB pitcher for the Kansas City Royals
- Nadya Suleman - mother of the longest-living octuplets, also known as the "Octomom"
- Diane Wakoski - poet and essayist, winner of the William Carlos Williams award for her book Emerald Ice
- Jonwayne - rapper and producer, previously signed to Stones Throw Records, more recently released music via his Authors Recording Company imprint
- Zebrahead - punk rock/pop punk band
- Norma Zimmer - honorary mayor of the City of La Habra in 1975 and featured singer and "Champagne Lady" of the Lawrence Welk Show
