= La Habra Stakes =

The La Habra Stakes is an American Thoroughbred horse race for three-year-old fillies run at Santa Anita Park in Arcadia, California early in the year. A Grade III stakes race, originally at about 6.5 furlongs on the Hillside Turf Course, it's raced on the turf oval at 5.5 furlongs since 2020 and offers a purse of $100,000.

This race is named for the city of La Habra, California, some distance south of the Santa Anita Racetrack. Once a land grant named by its owner, Rancho Cañada de La Habra, it's one of southern California's earliest settlements.

The race was not run in 2010.

Super Freaky holds the stakes record at 1:12.66. In 2009, Pasar Silbano ran it in 1:12.67.

== Past winners ==
- 2011 – Cambina (Ire) (Garrett Gomez)
- 2009 – Pasar Silbano (Ire) (Mike E. Smith)
- 2008 - Passion (Rafael Bejarano) (Ariege, winner of the Santa Anita Oaks, placed.)
- 2007 – Super Freaky (Jon Court)
- 2006 – Harriet Lane (Kent Desormeaux)
- 2005 – Shining Energy (René Douglas)
- 2004 – Very Vegas (Mike Ruis)
- 2003 – Luvah Girl (GB)
- 2002 – High Society (Brice Blanc)
- 2001 – Serena's Tune (first foal of Serena's Song.)
- 2000 – Squall City
- 1999 – Aviate
- 1998 – Conectis
- 1997 – Lavender
- 1996 – To B Super
- 1995 – Cat's Cradle
- 1994 – Dezibelles Star
- 1993 –
- 1992 –
- 1991 – Nice Assay (J. Paco Gonzalez)
- 1983 – Little Hailey
- 1977 – Reminiscing
- 1976 – Dancing Femme (American Champion Older Female Horse for 1977, Cascapedia, placed.)
- 1975 – NOT RUN
- 1974 – June's Love
- 1973 – Driftin Along
