= Habra (disambiguation) =

Habra is a city in India. It may also refer to:

- Habra I, a community development block in Barasat Sadar subdivision of North 24 Parganas district in the Indian state of West Bengal
- Habra II, a community development block in Barasat Sadar subdivision of North 24 Parganas district in the Indian state of West Bengal
- Habra (Vidhan Sabha constituency), an assembly constituency in North 24 Parganas district in the Indian state of West Bengal
- Habra River, a river in Algeria

== See also ==
- La Habra (disambiguation)
