= Kenneth Senne =

American electrical engineer

- Born: Kenneth David Senne; March 14, 1942; Akron, Ohio, U.S.
- Died: April 16, 2026 (aged 84); Concord, Massachusetts, U.S.
- Education: Stanford University
- Occupation: Electrical engineer
- Spouse: Linda L. Prusiecki (m. 1964; died. 2023)

Kenneth David Senne (March 14, 1942 – April 16, 2026) was an American electrical engineer.

== Early life and career ==
Senne was born in Akron, Ohio, the son of David and Pannie Senne. He was raised in La Habra, California, and he attended Stanford University, earning his BS, MS and PhD degree in electrical engineering. After earning his degrees, he served in the United States Air Force as a researcher at the United States Air Force Academy in Colorado Springs, Colorado.

Senne settled in Lexington, Massachusetts in 1972, and worked at MIT Lincoln Laboratory (MLL). During his time at MLL, from 1998 to 2002, he served as head of the Air Defense Technology Division, and in 2002, he was named a fellow of the Institute of Electrical and Electronics Engineers, "for contributions to the development of real-time adaptive signal processing systems for defense applications".

== Personal life and death ==
In 1964, Senne married Linda L. Prusiecki. Their marriage lasted until her death in 2023.

Senne died at the Emerson Hospital in Concord, Massachusetts, on April 16, 2026, at the age of 84.
