= Buena Park School District =

School district in California, United States

Address
- 6885 Orangethorpe Avenue Buena Park, California, 90620; United States

District information
- Type: Public
- Grades: K–8
- Superintendent: Dr. Julienne Lee
- Schools: 7
- NCES District ID: 0606360

Students and staff
- Students: 4,133 (2020–2021)
- Teachers: 174.27 (FTE)
- Staff: 193.39 (FTE)
- Student–teacher ratio: 23.72:1

Other information
- Website: www.bpsd.us

Buena Park Elementary School District is a public school district based in Orange County, California, United States.

The school district includes much of Buena Park as well as portions of Anaheim, Fullerton, and La Palma.

== Schools ==
The school district has had two middle schools and five elementary schools since the 2020–21 school year. High school students are either directed to the Anaheim Union High School District or the Fullerton Joint Union High School District.

- Gordon H. Beatty Middle School
- Arthur F. Corey Elementary
- Charles G. Emery Elementary
- Carl E. Gilbert Elementary
- Mabel L. Pendleton Elementary
- James A. Whitaker Elementary
- Buena Park Middle School
