= Fullerton Joint Union High School District =

School district in California

Address
- 1051 West Bastanchury Road Fullerton, California, 92833; United States

District information
- Type: Public
- Grades: 9–12
- NCES District ID: 0614760

Students and staff
- Students: 13,473
- Teachers: 544.51
- Staff: 463.88
- Student–teacher ratio: 24.74

Other information
- Website: fjuhsd.org

Fullerton Joint Union High School District (FJUHSD), founded in 1893 is a school district in Orange and Los Angeles counties, California.

The district serves a fifty-square-mile area which includes, within Orange County, the vast majority of the city of Fullerton, all of the city of La Habra, the northern half of Buena Park, and small sections of Anaheim, Brea, and La Palma. Within Los Angeles County it serves sections of Whittier, La Habra Heights, and the unincorporated community of East Whittier.

There are approximately 16,299 students in the union high school district and it is headed by Superintendent Steve McLaughlin.

== Schools ==
- Buena Park High School, Buena Park
- Fullerton Union High School, Fullerton
- La Habra High School, La Habra
- La Sierra High School, Fullerton (Independent Studies)
- Sonora High School, La Habra
- Sunny Hills High School, Fullerton
- Troy High School, Fullerton

=== Continuation schools ===
==== La Vista High School ====
La Vista High School (33°52′45″N 117°53′25″W) is a continuation high school in Fullerton at 909 N State College Blvd. As such, it is a high school for 16–18-year-old students in the district who, in most cases, have not made satisfactory progress toward graduation at one of the six comprehensive high schools in the district. Students are usually referred to La Vista High School by one of the traditional high schools because they are short on credits in required courses to graduate. The continuation school shares the same campus as Troy High School.

=== Former schools ===
- Lowell High School, Whittier, (1961–1980) Converted into Southern California University of Health Sciences.

== Feeder districts ==
- Buena Park School District
- Fullerton School District
- La Habra City School District
- Lowell Joint School District
