= Sonora High School (La Habra, California) =

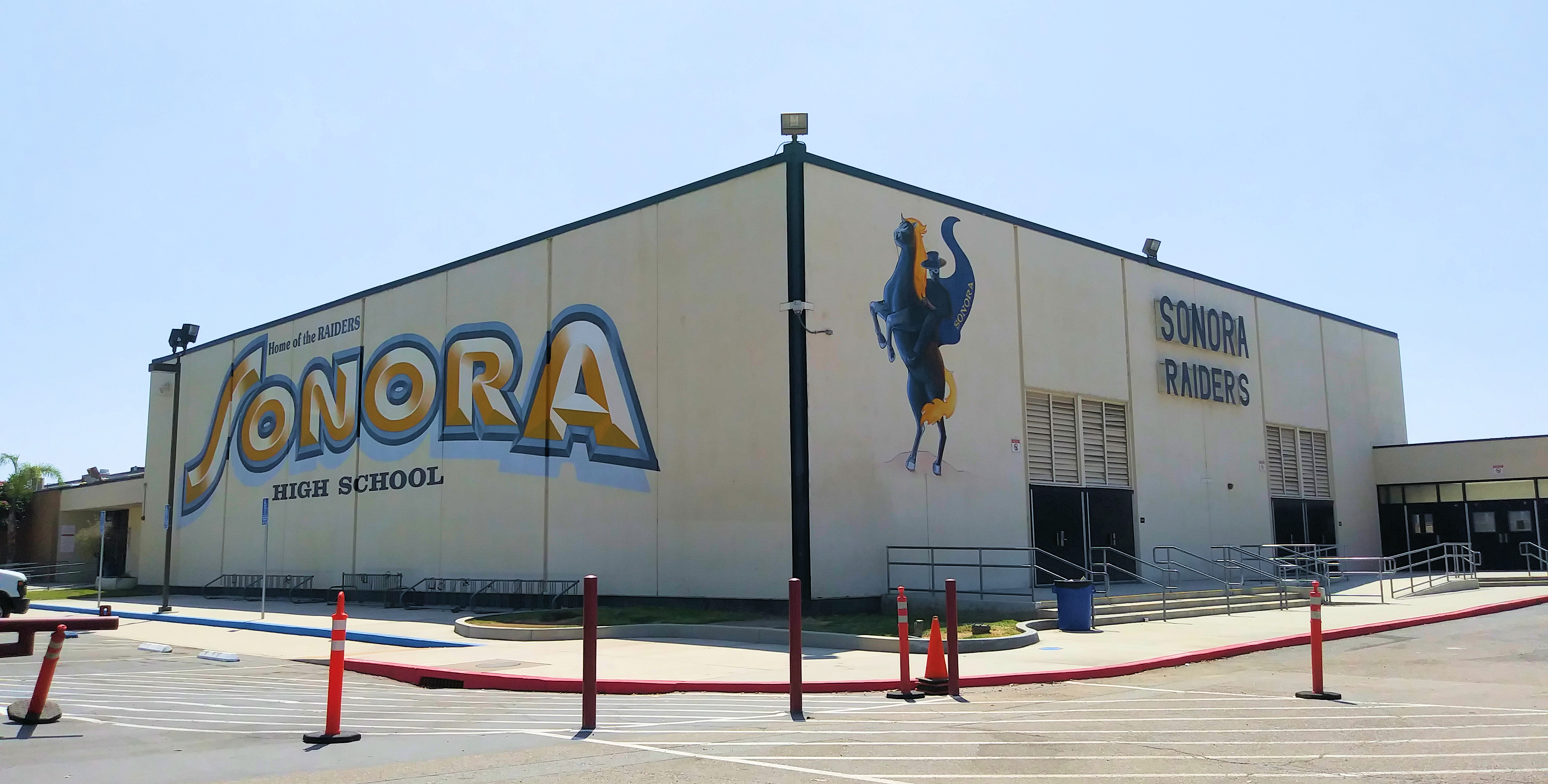
- Sonora's gymnasium in 2018

Location
- 401 S. Palm Street; La Habra, California; USA; 33.9276791°N 117.9250894°W

Information
- Type: Public secondary
- Motto: "Raider Pride All Clear "
- Established: September 1, 1966
- School district: FJUHSD
- School code: 30665143037090
- Administrator: Mike Lee, Jina Jackson, Jill Davis
- Principal: Ruth Crail
- Teaching staff: 74.02 (FTE)
- Grades: 9–12
- Enrollment: 1,707 (2023-2024)
- Student to teacher ratio: 23.06
- Campus type: Suburban
- Student Union/Association: Associated Student Body
- Colors: Navy Blue and Gold
- Athletics: Baseball, Basketball, Football, Water Polo, Swimming, Softball, Wrestling, Volleyball, Track & Field, Soccer, Cheer, Band, and Colorguard, Flag Football
- Mascot: Rowdy the Bear
- Nickname: Raiders
- Rival: La Habra High School
- Accreditation: WASC
- Yearbook: Vencedor
- Website: www.sonorahs.org

Sonora High School (SOHS) is a public high school located at 401 S. Palm Street in La Habra, north Orange County, California. One of seven high schools in the Fullerton Joint Union High School District, Sonora served over 1,944 students in the 2012-2013 school year. The school has an International Baccalaureate program, honors, and Advanced Placement (AP) options available for certain classes and is accredited by the Western Association of Schools and Colleges (WASC). The Alma Mater of the school, "Sons of old Sonora High, raise your voices to the sky! Raider now forever true, Sonora, praise to you! Blue and gold will light your name, long may reign your noble fame! Raiders join and sing anew, Sonora, praise to you!"

This school is not to be confused with Sonora High School in Sonora, CA.

== Demographics ==
White	Latino	Asian	African American	Pacific Islander	American Indian	Two or More Races
23%	64%	11%	1%	0.3%	0.2%	1%

According to U.S. News & World Report, 77% of Sonora's student body is "of color," with 49% of the student body coming from an economically disadvantaged household, determined by student eligibility for California's Reduced-price meal program.

== Athletics ==
The school is popular for its water polo and basketball programs. In the 2008-2009 school year, Sonora's girls' water polo team won the CIF Southern Section championship. In the 2014-2015 school year, Sonora's boys' basketball team won the CIF Southern Section Division 3 championship. The marching band (1st semester), drumline (2nd semester), dance team, drill team, JROTC Raider Team, and baseball team have claimed numerous trophies and awards for their excellent performances.

== Notable alumni ==
- Chigozie Anusiem, NFL cornerback for the Las Vegas Raiders
- James Cameron, Academy Award-winning film director (Avatar, Titanic)
- Cathy Cooper, artist, stylist
- Jack Cooper, composer, musician, educator
- Valorie Curry, actress
- Brian Greer, Major League Baseball player
- Daniel Hoffman, violinist and film producer
- Cole McDonald, 7th round of the 2020 NFL draft by the Tennessee Titans, University of Hawaii
- Ann Meyers, UCLA and pro basketball player, first high school student to play for U.S. national women's team
- David Meyers, basketball player for UCLA and NBA's Milwaukee Bucks, second selection of 1975 NBA draft
- Doug Nordquist, '84 Olympian, two-time high jump national champion; 7-8¾ PR
- Eli Villalobos, Major League Baseball pitcher
- Darren Ward, 1988, '92 Canadian Olympian swimmer, broke national high school record in 200 I.M. in 1987
