= Fullerton School District =

School district in California, United States

Address
- 1401 West Valencia Drive Fullerton, California, 92833; United States

District information
- Type: Public
- Grades: K–8
- Established: 1888
- NCES District ID: 0614730

Students and staff
- Students: 12,141
- Teachers: 465.69
- Staff: 620.67
- Student–teacher ratio: 26.07

Other information
- Website: www.fullertonsd.org

The Fullerton School District is a school district in California, with its headquarters in Fullerton. The school district serves the city of Fullerton, as well as small portions of La Habra, Brea, and Buena Park. It has schools from grades Kindergarten through 8th grade. High school students are transferred to the Fullerton Joint Union High School District.

== Schools ==
K-8 schools:

- Beechwood K-8
- Fisler K-8

Junior high schools

- Ladera Vista
- Nicolas
- Parks, known for its strong speech and debate team

Elementary schools:

- Acacia
- Commonwealth
- Fern Drive
- Golden Hill
- Hermosa Drive
- Laguna Road
- Maple
  - It was established in 1924, making it the oldest school in Fullerton School District. Its initial building had one story. A 1933 earthquake caused damage, and the building from that point on was one story. In the 1970s area courts required school districts to move minority children into other schools as part of school busing, and the school district closed the school in 1972. From that point toward, it served as a preschool and a community center. A neighborhood committee circa the 1990s advocated for the school to reopen as the district was finding its schools to be overcrowded. It reopened with kindergarten in 1996 and added a new grade level each year. Jerry Hicks of the Los Angeles Times wrote that the community wanted the school back even though it meant that de facto segregation would increase.
- Orangethorpe
- Pacific Drive
- Raymond
- Richman
- Rolling Hills
- Sunset Lane
- Valencia Park
- Woodcrest
