= Brent Boyd =

American football player (born 1957)

No. 62
- Position: Guard

Personal information
- Born: March 23, 1957 (age 69); Downey, California, U.S.
- Listed height: 6 ft 3 in (1.91 m)
- Listed weight: 268 lb (122 kg)

Career information
- High school: Lowell (Whittier, CA)
- College: UCLA
- NFL draft: 1980: 3rd round, 68th overall pick

Career history
- Minnesota Vikings (1980–1986)

Awards and highlights
- Second-team All-Pac-10 (1979)

Career NFL statistics
- Games: 59
- Games started: 27
- Stats at Pro Football Reference

Brent Boyd (born March 23, 1957) is an American former professional football player who was an offensive guard and an advocate for retired football players. He is considered by many to be the "father" of the concussion awareness issue due to his three US Congressional testimonies and media crusade to fight for proper treatment of NFL retirees, their wives and families, and all people who suffer from traumatic brain injuries.

== Biography ==
Boyd played football scholastically at Lowell High School in Whittier, California and collegiately at the University of California, Los Angeles. He graduated with Honors in 1980. He was accepted into law school but chose the NFL instead. The Minnesota Vikings selected him in the third round of the 1980 NFL draft. He played for the Vikings through the 1986 season. In his rookie year 1980, Boyd earned First-team NFL All-Rookie team, but his path to stardom was sidetracked when he blew his knee out the next year 1981. He fought through this injury anyway and played seven seasons.

Boyd resides in Reno, Nevada. He is the founder of the NFL retired players advocacy group, Dignity After Football. He has testified before Congress about the NFL's player-disability plan and about the health issues that he faces as a result of concussions suffered during his playing days.

== See also ==
- Living former players diagnosed with or reporting symptoms of chronic traumatic encephalopathy
