= 2017 Marathon County shootings =

Spree shooting in Wisconsin, U.S.

- 2017 Marathon County shootings (Wisconsin) 2017 Marathon County shootings (the United States)
- Location: Schofield, Weston, Wisconsin and Rothschild, Wisconsin, United States
- Date: March 22, 2017; 9 years ago 12:27 p.m. (CDT)
- Target: Naly Vang, the perpetrator's wife
- Attack type: Spree killing
- Weapons: Handgun; Long gun
- Deaths: 5 (including the perpetrator)
- Injuries: 0
- Perpetrator: Nengmy Vang
- Motive: Domestic dispute

On March 22, 2017, a shooting spree occurred in the city of Schofield and the villages of Rothschild and Weston, three communities located in Marathon County, Wisconsin, United States. The perpetrator, Nengmy Vang, upset following a dispute with his wife, fatally shot two employees at the bank where she worked, his wife's lawyer, and a police officer. After a three-hour standoff, Vang was shot by police officers and later died from his wounds.

The shooting resulted in the Wisconsin legislature passing "Sara's Law", named after Sara Quirt Sann, one of the victims. The law "makes it a felony to harm or threaten a lawyer, corporation counsel or guardian ad litem for work on a family law case".

== Background ==
According to a Wausau Daily Herald interview with Naly Vang, her marriage to Nengmy had been fraught with trouble over its 25-year tenure. Naly Vang, a Laotian immigrant, met Nengmy when she was 16, and married a year later when Naly was 17 and Nengmy was 21. She had their first of seven children shortly after the marriage began.

Around 2007, according to Naly, Nengmy began spending more time away from home, drinking heavily and leaving Naly to run the household. According to family friends, Nengmy began dancing with other women at these parties, and after checking his phone bills (Naly dealt with the family's finances), she noticed several calls to another woman. According to court records obtained by the Herald, Nengmy was the target of frequent legal action over unpaid credit card balances, and Naly had attempted to rein in her husband's spending, to no avail. In May 2008, Nengmy called the police to report that his wife had broken several appliances while confronting him about a suspected affair. Police arrested Naly on a charge of noncriminal disorderly conduct, and she served no jail time.

Though the Vangs' marriage was not especially violent, Nengmy was extremely emotionally abusive, according to Mao Khang, a social worker at a Wausau-based domestic violence organization. Nengmy moved out of the family's house in 2015 and filed for divorce shortly after, hoping for a quick settlement. Nengmy wanted to use the Hmong clan system to resolve the divorce, but Naly wished to use the court system, as she felt it would give her more security towards receiving custody and child support payments.

Naly believed that Nengmy was pursuing a relationship with a woman in Laos, as he told her he was planning on moving there after attempting to cash out some of his assets. According to Nengmy Vang's brother, he began acting "crazy," and hit their mother after his separation from Naly; he also believed his brother to have a "serious mental illness." Police were called to the Vang residence 5 times in late 2015, when Nengmy attempted to remove his belongings, but no arrests resulted. Nengmy threatened that "something bad would happen" if Naly continued to request alimony payments.

== Shootings ==
=== Marathon Savings Bank ===
Nengmy Vang phoned his wife, Naly, and demanded that she sign divorce papers within 24 hours, or he would kill her. He arrived at the bank a short time later, and asked Naly to sign the papers, saying "Do you want to die now?" in Hmong before exiting the bank to go to his car. According to Naly Vang, she knew that her husband kept a handgun in the car, and fearing for her life, fled to a nearby Subway restaurant. From there, she called police around 1 PM to report her husband's confrontation at the bank. Nengmy Vang then returned to the bank with a black bag, loaded his gun, and shot MSB employees Dianne Look and Karen Barclay, who later died from their wounds.

=== Law offices of Tlusty, Kennedy & Dirks ===
After shooting the bank tellers, Vang drove to the law offices of Tlusty, Kennedy and Dirks, where his wife's attorney, Sara Quirt Sann, worked. He held two people at gunpoint and demanded to be led to Quirt Sann's office, where he briefly confronted Quirt Sann before killing her.

=== Standoff at Nengmy Vang's apartment ===
Vang's final act was to return to his apartment in the village of Weston. As the police set up a safety perimeter around Vang's apartment, a shot rang out, killing Detective Jason Weiland of the Everest Metropolitan Police Department. Weiland's killing began a three-hour standoff, where police and dispatchers attempted to coax Vang out of his apartment, but he refused. An Everest Metro Police Detective Sergeant fired into the apartment, wounding Vang. Vang called 911 twice during the standoff, expressing remorse for the murders and requesting that news stations send reporters so he could explain his actions. Police turned off power in the apartment, and tore down part of an exterior wall with an armored car, leading to Vang firing a warning shot. Seeing Vang with a weapon, a SWAT team member fired into the apartment, wounding him further. Vang later died of his wounds at a Wausau hospital.

== Victims ==
- Det. Jason Weiland, 40; an 18-year veteran of Wausau-area law enforcement
- Dianne Look, 67; branch manager of the Marathon Savings Bank where Naly Vang worked as a teller
- Karen Barclay, 62; another teller at Marathon Savings Bank
- Sarah H. Quirt Sann, 43; attorney at Tlusty, Kennedy & Dirks and Naly Vang's divorce lawyer

== Aftermath ==
The shooting led to the passage of Wisconsin Assembly Bill 825, colloquially known as "Sara's Law." Introduced by Schofield assemblyman Patrick Snyder and 8 other assemblypersons (6 Republican, 2 Democrat), the bill reworded a Wisconsin stature with regard to protections against harm for judges, prosecutors and court bailiffs. The revised statute extended the law's protections to family lawyers, guardians ad litem, and corporate lawyers, making the act of threatening any of the named professions a felony punishable by a fine of $10,000 and six years in prison. The bill passed the Wisconsin legislature with no debate, and governor Scott Walker signed the bill into law in February 2018. According to legal scholar Stephen Kerson, the law, which was the first of its kind in the country, could provide a case study into providing better protections for family lawyers.
