= Taeha Types =

Mechanical keyboard creator and livestreamer

Twitch information
- Channel: taehatypes
- Genre: Non-gaming
- Followers: 234 thousand
- Last updated: January 1, 2023

Tae Ha Kim, known by his streaming channel Taeha Types, is a mechanical keyboard creator and livestreamer. While known for his commissioned keyboards, his Twitch livestream compose his primary occupation. His channel has influenced the rise of the mechanical keyboard hobby, particularly boosted by his viral video assembling a commission for Fortnite streamer Tfue.

== Early life ==
Tae Ha Kim was born in 1995 or 1996 and raised in California. Prior to streaming, he worked as a software engineer.

== Streaming career ==
Kim began live streaming himself assembling mechanical keyboards in 2018. He was not the first creator to do so, but he focused on making his videos accessible to beginners and creating a platform for keyboard appreciation. The condensed cut of his livestream assembling a keyboard for Fortnite streamer Tfue became a viral hit, with two million views in under two weeks. Kim's Twitch channel is his primary occupation, where he is funded by donations and subscriptions, rather than by commissions. Kim has created keyboards by commission for other livestreamers, including LilyPichu. Tom's Hardware described Kim's popular livestream as being a significant contributor to the growth of the mechanical keyboard hobby.

Kim also makes ASMR typing videos and contributed to a vinyl record of mechanical keyboard sounds released on Trunk Records in 2019.
