= Lowell Joint School District =

School district in California, United States

Address
- 11019 Valley Home Avenue Whittier, California, 90603; United States

District information
- Type: Public
- Grades: K–8
- Superintendent: Jim Coombs
- Schools: 6
- NCES District ID: 0623010

Students and staff
- Students: 3,139 (2020–2021)
- Teachers: 122.6 (FTE)
- Staff: 129.8 (FTE)
- Student–teacher ratio: 25.6:1

Other information
- Website: www.ljsd.org

Lowell Joint School District is a public school district in Orange County and Los Angeles County, California, United States. Within Los Angeles County the district serves the easternmost portion of Whittier, La Habra Heights, and the unincorporated community of East Whittier. Within Orange County it serves a portion of La Habra. The school district serves as a feeder district for Fullerton Joint Union High School District.

== Schools ==
- El Portal Elementary School, La Habra
- Jordan Elementary School, Whittier
- Macy Elementary School, La Habra
- Meadow Green Elementary School, East Whittier
- Olita Elementary School, La Habra
- Rancho-Starbuck Intermediate, East Whittier
