= Killing of Michael Cho =

2007 shooting of a Korean-American man in La Habra, California

- Date: December 31, 2007
- Time: 2:00 p.m.
- Location: 545 Whittier Boulevard, La Habra, California, United States; 33°56′21.3″N 117°57′05.2″W
- Filmed by: Liquor store's closed-circuit television camera
- Participants: Michael Cho (death); La Habra Police Department officers Pete DiPasqua and John Jaime (shooters)
- Deaths: Michael Cho
- Charges: None filed
- Litigation: Lawsuit filed against city, settled for $100,000

The shooting of Michael Sungman Cho occurred on December 31, 2007, in the Orange County city of La Habra, California. Cho, a 25-year-old Korean-American artist, was brandishing a tire iron outside a store and was shot by two police officers. The shooting was ruled justified by the Orange County district attorney. Cho's family received a $100,000 settlement from a lawsuit.

== Death ==
At 1 p.m. on New Year's Eve, police received a telephone report that an Asian man was vandalizing car windows on North Walnut Avenue; the officers who arrived on the scene were unable to find the man reported. The same person called in an hour later to report that the man in question was at Walnut Avenue and Whittier Boulevard and had a tire iron. Police arrived at the address of the alleged vandalism, the 7Gold Liquor Store at 545 Whittier Boulevard, after 2 p.m.; they contacted their dispatcher at 2:04 to state that they were outside of the liquor store with Cho. Their next communication with the dispatcher was 41 seconds later, during which they stated that they had shot Cho, and requested assistance from paramedics. The paramedics pronounced Cho dead at the scene.

The liquor store's closed-circuit television camera recorded 25 seconds of the incident. The relevant clip shows the two officers, Pete DiPasqua and John Jaime, with two guns drawn; Cho walked towards them and brought his right hand to his mouth. He appeared to be holding an object in his left hand. He then turned to his right and walked out of the camera's view; police continued to point their guns at him. The officers claimed that the object Cho was holding was the previously-reported tire iron, and that he threatened them with it and refused orders to put it down. Newspaper reports stated that police fired ten shots at Cho; La Habra police chief Dennis Kies was unable to confirm this number in an interview ten days after the shooting.

== Reactions ==
Friends and community members were angered and saddened by the shootings. UCLA art professor James Welling expressed his disbelief that Cho could be perceived as "menacing"; he described Cho as a "good-natured" person who was always "hanging around with high-achieving art students". On January 5, 2008, more than 100 of Cho's friends and relatives held a candlelight vigil at the site of his death; they set up photographs of Cho and left notes of condolence. His funeral was held on the morning of January 12, 2008, at the Good Stewards Church; he was buried at Oakdale Memorial Park that afternoon. On February 19, 2008, 200 people gathered outside La Habra City Hall to demand police provide answers. In contrast to the previous memorial, at which the atmosphere was one of mourning, the attendees at the February memorial expressed their anger at police. A Facebook group created to celebrate his life and protest his death had grown to 3,000 members by late February 2008.

== Investigation and lawsuit ==
The officers involved in the shooting were placed on administrative leave, and the department planned to convene an internal review panel to look into the death. By the following month, the officers had returned to work. Cho's death was the second Orange County officer-involved shooting in two days; on the morning of January 30, police responding to a domestic violence call shot a man in the abdomen after he allegedly lunged at them with a knife. Of the 49 officer-involved shootings in Orange County since July 2004, the La Habra Police Department was responsible for four, making them one of the most deadly out of over twenty municipal police departments in the county. The La Habra Police Department declined to release the names of the officers in question. In June 2008, the Orange County district attorney's office announced that their investigation concluded that the killing was a justifiable homicide, and that no charges would be filed.

Cho's family hired Shelley Kaufman and Pat Harris, attorneys with the firm of high-profile criminal defense lawyer Mark Geragos, to represent them and were reportedly considering a lawsuit against the La Habra Police Department. Few community leaders expected that the officers in question would be punished for the shooting death. In July 2008, they filed a civil suit against the city of La Habra and the officers in question. Their suit alleged wrongful death and negligence. Southern California District Court judge Alicemarie H. Stotler announced in November 2009 that the trial would begin on February 2, 2010. However, the trial resulted in a hung jury, and Stotler declared a mistrial. In April 2010, a new trial date of September 21 was announced, with a settlement conference to be held in June. On September 15, less than a week before the trial date, Cho's family accepted a $100,000 settlement, stating that they hoped to avoid the "emotional ordeal" of a second trial.
