= Rancho La Habra =

Mexican land grant in California

Coordinates: 33.950°N 117.960°W

Rancho La Habra (also called "Rancho Cañada de La Habra") was a 6,698-acre (27.11 km^{2}) Mexican land grant in present-day Los Angeles County and Orange County, California, given in 1839 by Governor Juan Alvarado to Mariano Reyes Roldan. The name refers to the "Pass Through the Hills", the natural pass to the north between the Chino Hills and Puente Hills into the San Gabriel Valley, first discovered by Spanish explorers in 1769. The La Habra grant was shaped like a wedge pointed south. The rancho lands included the present day cities of La Habra and La Habra Heights.

== History ==
California's Mexican Governor Juan B. Alvarado awarded the land grant of 1.5 square leagues to Mariano Reyes Roldán, a 40-year-old ayuntamiento (municipal council member) of Los Angeles. Roldán named it Rancho Cañada de le Habra. Roldán sold the rancho to Andrés Pico.

With the cession of California to the United States following the Mexican–American War, the 1848 Treaty of Guadalupe Hidalgo provided that the land grants would be honored. As required by the Land Act of 1851, a claim was filed with the Public Land Commission in 1852, and the grant was patented to Andrés Pico and Francisco de Uribe de Campo in 1872.

Abel Stearns purchased the land in 1861, however, after the drought in 1863, he was forced to sell. Most of the new purchasers were Basque sheep growers. Domingo Bastanchury and Jose Sansinena were partners until 1889, when Sansinena acquired a 5,000-acre (20 km^{2}) sheep ranch that included most of La Habra city and La Habra Heights. Jose Sansinena died in 1896.

In 1894 Willitts J. Hole (1858–1936) purchased several large tracts in the area. Mrs. Sansinena sold 3,500 acres (14 km^{2}) that would later become La Habra Heights. Hole and his partners began selling off smaller parcels of land, sowing the seeds that led to creation of cities of La Habra first and then Brea. Hole leased the land to a man named Toussou, for sheep grazing purposes. Around 1904, he sold the oil rights to Rudisill, who in turn, transferred them to the Union Oil Company. From then on, the pace toward a La Habra community quickened. La Habra township status was granted about 1917.

Edwin G. Hart was a developer who was born in Ohio, came to California at a young age and lived in Sierra Madre. In 1914, Hart began acquiring the 3,500-acre (14 km^{2}) Sansinena ranch from Willitts J. Hole, and the sale for the ranch completed in 1919.
