= La Habra High School =

Coordinates: 33°56′14″N 117°57′23″W

Location
- 801 West Highlander Avenue; La Habra, California 90631

Information
- Established: 1954
- School district: Fullerton Joint Union High School District
- Principal: Steve Garcia
- Teaching staff: 79.89 (FTE)
- Grades: 9–12
- Age range: 13–18
- Student to teacher ratio: 23.54
- Colors: Blue and white
- Fight song: "Hail to the Victors"
- Mascot: Highlanders
- Rival: Sonora, La Habra
- Newspaper: Scotch Tape
- Key products: La Habra Hub

La Habra High School is a public co-educational high school located in the Orange County, California city of La Habra. Located between the Coyote Hills to the south and Puente Hills to the north, LHHS opened in 1954 and graduated its first class in 1956. It is a California Distinguished High School and has been nominated as a National Blue Ribbon School. The school is a member of the Fullerton Joint Union High School District. LHHS absorbed a majority of the students from nearby Lowell High School when it closed in June 1980.

== Athletics ==
La Habra's sports teams are known as the Highlanders and are members of the Freeway League in CIF Southern Section.

== CIF championships ==
- Football: 2002, 2003, 2007, 2008, 2009, 2010, 2015, 2016,2025
- Girls volleyball: 1989, 1990, 1991, 1998, 2000
- Men's soccer: 2007, 2008
- Cheer: 2020, 2023
- Basketball: 2024

== Notable alumni ==
- Rusty Anderson, guitarist for Paul McCartney's Band – Macca
- Eric Barriere, professional football quarterback
- Kenny Endo, (taiko artist)
- Greg Gaines, NFL nose tackle for the Los Angeles Rams
- Jennifer Hanson, Miss California, country music artist
- Ronnie Hillman, NFL running back
- Ryan Knowles, Broadway actor
- Mark Kostabi, artist
- John N. Lotz, Air National Guard Brigadier General
- Terrence Mahon, distance running coach
- Alan Newman, former professional baseball player, Tampa Bay Rays and Cleveland Indians
- Dan Owens, former NFL defensive end who last played for the Detroit Lions
- Kyle Peko, NFL nose tackle for the Denver Broncos
- Dan Radlauer, composer, arranger
- Anne Ramsay, actress: Hawthorne, A League of Their Own, Mad About You
- Bubby Rossman ('10), major league baseball pitcher for the Philadelphia Phillies
- Darin Toohey, American atmospheric scientist
- Jenny Topping, U.S. Olympic softball player
- Chuck Weatherspoon, former NFL running back for Tampa Bay Buccaneers
- Josh Staumont, former MLB pitcher for the Kansas City Royals.
- Clark Phillips III, Current NFL cornerback for Chicago Bears.
