= MV Chacon =

MV Chacon may refer to:

- Chacon (1912), a historic fishing vessel in Chugiak Alaska
- Chacon (1918), a ship lost at sea in 1937
