= Chacon =

Chacon may refer to:

- Chacón, a list of people with the surname Chacón or Chacon
- Captain Trudy Chacon, a fictional character in the 2009 film Avatar
- Chacon, New Mexico, United States, a town
- Chacon Creek, a small stream in Texas, United States
- Chacon (1912), a wooden fishing vessel in Alaska
- Chacon (1918), a ship lost at sea in 1937

== See also ==
- Chaconne, a type of musical composition
- Chaconne (ballet), a 1976 ballet
- "The Chaconne", the last movement of Partita for Violin No. 2 (Bach), a work by Johann Sebastian Bach
