= Westward =

Westward may refer to:

- The cardinal direction West
- Westward, Cumbria, a settlement in north-west England
- Westward (series), a series of games video created by Sandlot Games
- Westward Islet of Ducie Island
- Westward Television, a former ITV franchise in the South West of England
- MV Westward, a motor yacht
- MS Westward, a cruise ship operated by the Norwegian Cruise Line 1991—1994
- ASP Westward, a local newspaper company in Texas
- Westward (racing yacht), a museum ship in Tasmania

== See also ==
- Westward Ho!
- Westword, a publication based in Denver, Colorado
