= Chacón =

Chacón is a Spanish surname. Notable people with the surname include:

- Alex Pineda Chacón (born 1969), American coach
- Alicia R. Chacón (1938–2025), American politician and judge
- Antonio Chacón (1869–1929), flamenco singer
- Arturo Chacón Cruz (born 1977), Mexican tenor
- Bobby Chacon (1951–2016), American boxer
- Carme Chacón (1971–2017), Catalan politician
- Cecilia Chacón Castillo, Ecuadorian politician
- Cecilia Chacón (born 1971), Peruvian politician
- Charyl Chacón (born 1985), beauty pageant title-holder
- Diego Fajardo Chacón, Spanish military governor of the Philippines
- Dulce Chacón (1954–2003), Spanish poet
- Elio Chacón (1936–1992), Venezuelan baseball player
- Iris Chacón (born 1950), Puerto Rican dancer
- José Chacón (disambiguation), several people
- Lázaro Chacón González (1873–1931), President of Guatemala
- Lucía Chacón Hechavarría (1911–2024), Cuban supercentenarian
- Manuel Aguilar Chacón (1797–1846), head of state of Costa Rica
- Mariandrée Chacón (born 2004), Guatemalan sprinter
- Oscar Baylón Chacón (1929–2020), Mexican politician
- Pablo Chacón (born 1975), Argentine boxer
- Pelayo Chacón (1888 – after 1930), Negro and Cuban League baseball player
- Peter R. Chacon (1925–2014), Californian politician
- Santiago Chacón (born 1992), Argentine footballer
- Shawn Chacón (born 1977), baseball player
- Soledad Chacón (1890–1936), American politician

== See also ==
- Chacon (disambiguation)
- Chaconne, a musical form
- Chacín, another surname
