= Willits J. Hole =

American businessman

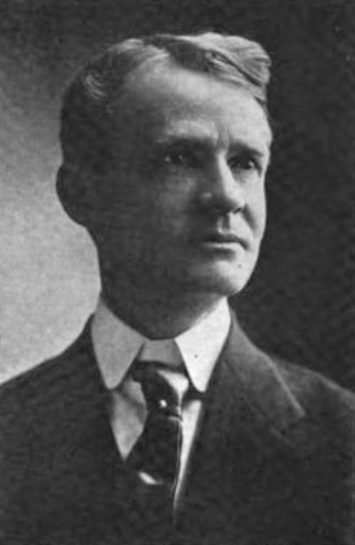
- Born: October 9, 1858; Madison, Indiana, US
- Died: December 17, 1936 (aged 78); La Sierra, California, US
- Resting place: Evergreen Cemetery
- Other name: Willitts J. Hole
- Spouse: Mary Hole
- Children: 1

Willits J. Hole (October 9, 1858 – December 17, 1936) was an American businessman and real estate developer of Southern California, during the early part of the twentieth century. He was known as the "father" of the city of La Habra, California.

== Early life ==
Hole was born in Madison, Indiana, the son of William and Matilda (Hasley) Hole, and the family moved to Louisville, Kentucky.

== Career ==
Hole became the owner of a chair factory in North Vernon in 1889. In time he became a contractor and builder, and, studying architecture, designed his own buildings.

=== Southern California ===
After spending the first three months at Santa Barbara, Hole went to Whittier and soon afterward began buying land in the La Habra Valley. He bought 3,500 acres (14 km^{2}) of Rancho La Habra from the Sansinena heirs, and laid out and sold a tract of land that would become La Habra, and as a consequence he is known as the "Father of La Habra."

In 1897, Hole became resident agent at Los Angeles for the Stearns Rancho Company of San Francisco which owned over 180,000 acres (728 km^{2}), which Hole gradually sold off.

The Stearns Rancho Company property included Rancho La Sierra that stretched from Corona to Arlington in Riverside. In 1910, after its owner was unable to repay the debt, Hole foreclosed on it, and it became the Hole Ranch, and he built a mansion on the property. He also owned a winter home in Palm Springs, California.

== Boating ==
Hole was an avid fisherman. In the early 1920s, Hole took up boating. Naval architect, Leslie Edward Geary designed, and N. J. Blanchard built in 1923, the 115-foot motor yacht Samona for Hole.

In 1931, the Craig Shipbuilding Company built the 147-foot, a steel-hulled long-range cruiser Samona II, which was bought by the US Navy in 1940, and commissioned as the USS Amethyst (PYc-3).

== Personal life ==
In 1887, Hole married Mary B. Weeks (1865–1938). They had a daughter Agnes Marion Hole. Hole's daughter married Samuel Knight Rindge (1888–1968), son of Frederick H. Rindge, owner of Rancho Topanga Malibu Sequit.

In 1893, Hole and his family moved to Southern California.

Hole died at his home in La Sierra on December 17, 1936. He is interred at Evergreen Cemetery in Riverside, California.

=== Legacy ===
In 1938, Agnes Hole Rindge donated the Willits J. Hole art collection to the University of California, Los Angeles.

Hole Lake is named for Hole, who had the dam built that forms the reservoir.
