= USS Amethyst =

Patrol vessel of the United States Navy

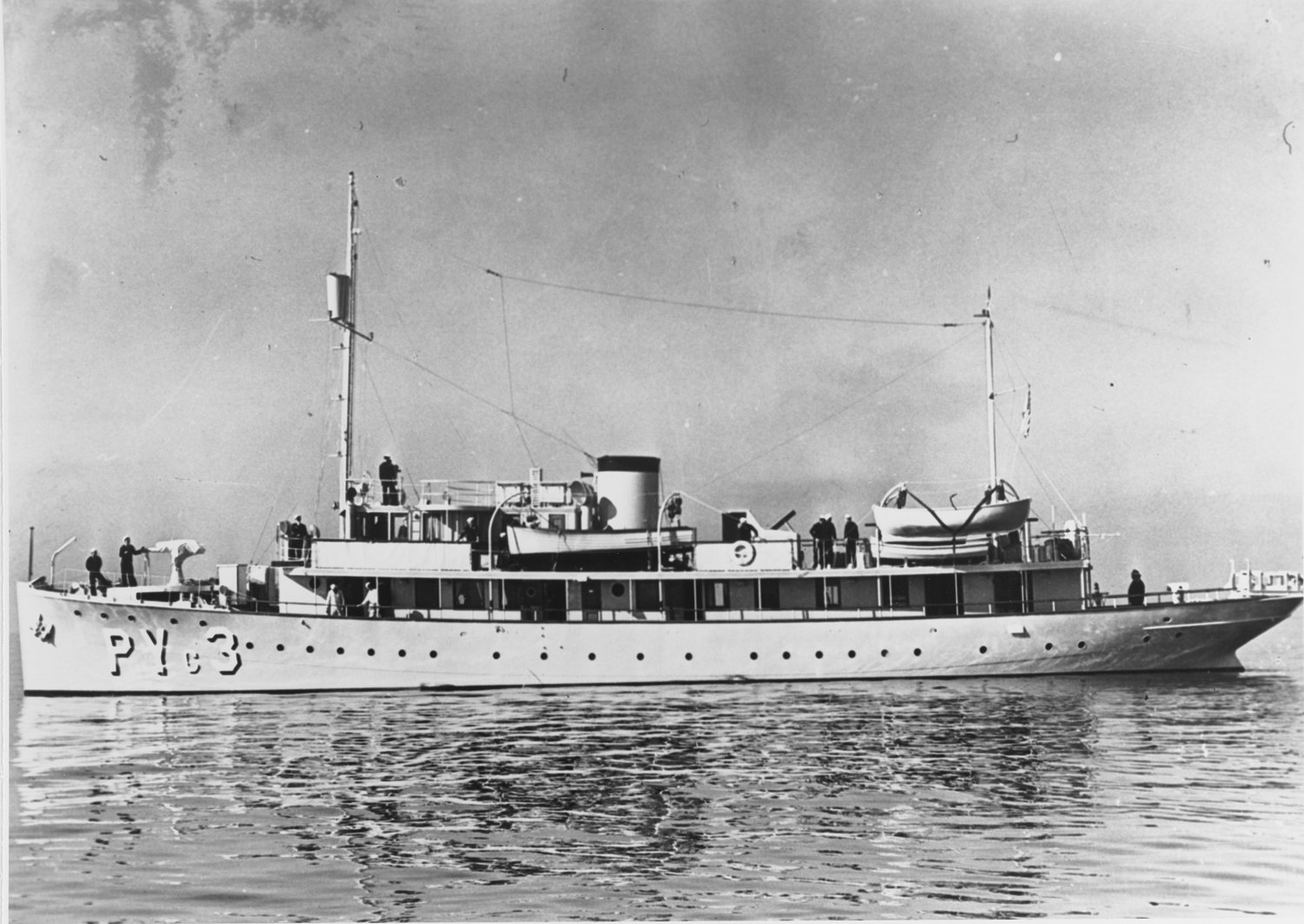
- USS Amethyst seen in February 1941

History

United States
- Name: Samona II
- Owner: Willitts J. Hole
- Builder: Craig Shipbuilding Company, Long Beach, California
- Yard number: 154
- Laid down: 15 March 1931
- Launched: 25 June 1931
- Maiden voyage: 31 July 1931
- Home port: Los Angeles, California
- Identification: Official number: 231094; Signal letters: WFEN
- Fate: Acquired by the Navy, 4 November 1940

United States
- Name: Amethyst
- Namesake: Amethyst
- Acquired: 4 November 1940
- Commissioned: 27 February 1941
- Decommissioned: 2 February 1944
- Identification: Hull symbol: PYc-3; Code letters: NCDD
- Fate: Transferred to the Coast Guard, 10 March 1944

United States
- Name: Amethyst
- Acquired: 10 March 1944
- Commissioned: 19 April 1944
- Decommissioned: 27 February 1946
- Stricken: 12 March 1946
- Identification: Hull symbol: WPYc-3
- Fate: Transferred to the Maritime Commission, 11 September 1946

United States
- Name: Pudlu (1951–1961)
- Owner: David P. Hamilton (1951–1960); Norman Manning (1961)
- Home port: Gulfport, Mississippi (1951–1960); Miami, Florida (1961)
- Identification: Official number: 231094; Signal letters: WD3713
- Fate: Transferred to Panamanian flag, 1962

General characteristics
- Type: Coastal yacht patrol boat
- Tonnage: 350 GRT
- Displacement: 525 long tons (533 t)
- Length: 146 ft 9 in (44.7 m)
- Beam: 23 ft 10 in (7.26 m)
- Draft: 11 ft (3.4 m)
- Depth: 12 ft 11 in (3.94 m)
- Installed power: 2 × Winton 158-6 diesel engines; 2,000 shp (1,500 kW)
- Propulsion: 2 × screws
- Speed: 14.5 knots (26.9 km/h; 16.7 mph)
- Endurance: 7,000 nmi (13,000 km; 8,100 mi) at 14 knots (26 km/h; 16 mph); 10,000 nmi (19,000 km; 12,000 mi) at 12 knots (22 km/h; 14 mph)
- Complement: 12 (private yacht); 53 (Navy service)
- Armament: 1 × 40 mm (1.6 in) Bofors anti-aircraft gun (removed 1944); 1 × 3 in (76 mm)/50 caliber gun (installed 1944); 2 × depth charge tracks

USS Amethyst (PYc-3) was the yacht Samona II taken into service in the United States Navy serving as a patrol boat during World War II. After military service the vessel was returned to civilian status in 1946 and again became the yacht Samona II until sale and subsequent names of Pudlo and Explorer.

== Yacht Samona II ==
Samona II was designed by Leslie Edward (Ted) Geary and built by Craig Shipbuilding Company, Long Beach, California for Willitts J. Hole, a prominent financier of Los Angeles, California as hull number 154 with keel laid 15 March 1931, launch on 25 June and maiden voyage on 31 July 1931.

The yacht was 146 ft 9 in (44.7 m) in length, 23 ft 6 in (7.2 m) beam with a draft of 10 ft 6 in (3.2 m) (11 ft (3.4 m) Navy) powered by two 500-horsepower (370 kW) Winton diesel engines driving two screws. With 20,000 US gallons (76,000 L) of fuel the yacht's range was estimated as 7,000 nautical miles (13,000 km; 8,100 mi) at 14 knots (26 km/h; 16 mph) or 10,000 nautical miles (19,000 km; 12,000 mi) at 12 knots (22 km/h; 14 mph). Fresh water capacity was 11,000 US gallons (42,000 L). The design included five double staterooms with connecting baths and a large owner's stateroom. Hole was an avid fisherman who contributed to scientific collections so the yacht carried fishing boats as well as 1,000 US gallons (3,800 L) of gasoline for them in special isolated tanks.

On 1 August 1931, the day after leaving the yard on delivery, Samona II departed on a shakedown trip to Alaska. On 9 November 1931 the yacht was on the way via the Panama Canal to the east coast of South America where, after a time exploring the Amazon and Rio Negro rivers, a course was followed through the Strait of Magellan and up the west coast of South America to Los Angeles.

Willitts Hole died in 1936 and his estate, including the Willitts J. Hole Art Collection, passed eventually to his daughter Agnes Hole Rindge and son-in-law Samuel K. Rindge. The Rindges continued the yacht's collecting tradition after Hole's death into 1939.

== World War II service ==
Samona II was purchased by the Navy on 4 November 1940, from Samuel K. Rindge of Los Angeles. The yacht was converted for naval service by Craig Shipbuilding; and commissioned on 27 February 1941.

=== US Navy service ===
The ship was assigned to the Inshore Patrol, 11th Naval District, and helped to patrol the entrance to Los Angeles Harbor. After the United States entered the war, the yacht expanded her role to include escorting vessels and convoys as well as carrying local passenger traffic.

On 1 April 1943, Amethyst was attached to the Surface Task Group, Southern Section, San Pedro, California, and continued her patrol duties off the southern California coast through January 1944. She was decommissioned on 2 February 1944.

=== US Coast Guard service ===
Placed back in commission on 19 April 1944 and manned by a Coast Guard crew, Amethyst reported to the Western Sea Frontier section base at Treasure Island, California. Through the end of 1945, the ship maintained plane guard station, collected weather data, and carried out antisubmarine and antiaircraft coastal patrols.

Amethyst was decommissioned at San Diego, California, on 27 February 1946. Her name was struck from the Navy List on 12 March. She was transferred on 11 September to the Maritime Commission for disposal.

== Post war ==
She was subsequently sold back to Samuel K. Rindge and resumed the name Samona II and served as a yacht. Purchased in the early 1950s by David P. Hamilton of Shreveport, Louisiana, she served him under the name Pudlo until sold in 1962 to Clarene Y. Martin of Houston, Texas, and renamed Explorer. As of 2000, she was still reported to be in use along the Gulf Coast.
