= Chickamauga =

Chickamauga may refer to:

== People ==
- Chickamauga Cherokee, (also "Lower Cherokee"), a Native American group who separated for a time from the main body of the Cherokee people

== Entertainment ==
- "Chickamauga", an 1889 short story by American author Ambrose Bierce
- "Chickamauga", a 1937 short story by Thomas Wolfe
- "Chickamauga", a song by Uncle Tupelo from their 1993 album Anodyne
- Chickamauga (film), a 1962 short film by Robert Enrico based on Bierce's story

== Military ==
- Battle of Chickamauga in the American Civil War
- Cherokee–American wars, between the Chickamauga Cherokee and Anglo-American settlers, 1776–1794
- Chickamauga Campaign, Civil War battles in northwestern Georgia, 1863

== Places ==
- Chickamauga, Georgia
- Chickamauga Lake, on the Tennessee River
- Chickamauga Dam, a hydroelectric dam on the Tennessee River in Chattanooga, Tennessee

=== Rivers ===
- Chickamauga Creek (Chattahoochee River), a stream in Georgia
- Chickamauga Creek, tributary of the Tennessee River

== Other ==
- Chickamauga (tug boat), first diesel powered tug boat built in the United States
- Chickamauga Cherokee, a band of the Native American tribe following chief Dragging Canoe
- "The Rock of Chickamauga", a nickname for Gen. George Henry Thomas, from his service in the Battle of Chickamauga
