= Norton Simon =

American industrialist and philanthropist

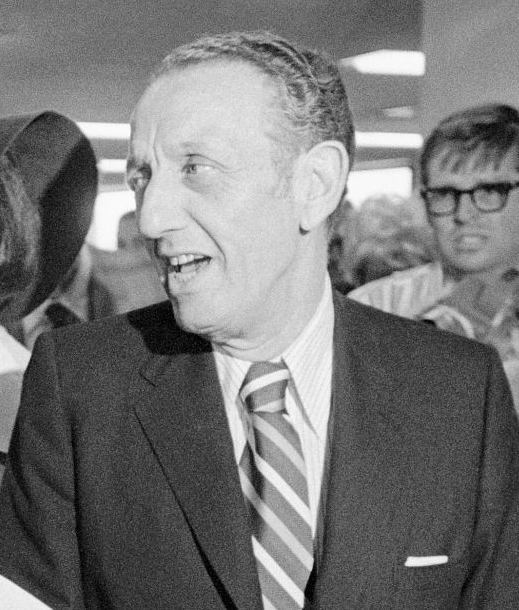
- Simon in 1971
- Born: February 5, 1907; Portland, Oregon, U.S.
- Died: June 2, 1993 (aged 86); Los Angeles, California, U.S.
- Education: University of California, Berkeley
- Occupations: Industrialist, philanthropist
- Known for: Founder of the Norton Simon Museum; Founder of Hunt's Foods, owner of Hunt's Ketchup, Tanqueray Gin
- Political party: Republican
- Board member of: Hunt's Foods
- Spouses: Lucille Ellis (m. 1933; div. 1970) Jennifer Jones (m. 1971)
- Children: 2

Norton Winfred Simon (February 5, 1907 – June 2, 1993) was an American industrialist and philanthropist. He was at one time one of the wealthiest men in America. At the time of his death, he had amassed a net worth of nearly US$10 billion.

Simon was born to a Jewish family in Portland, Oregon. His father operated a wholesale goods store there. When Simon was sixteen years old, he relocated with his family from Portland to San Francisco following his mother's death. After dropping out of the University of California, Berkeley, Simon founded a sheet metal company before investing in an insolvent orange juice bottling plant in Fullerton, California. The company was renamed Val Vita Food Products Company, and, under Simon's supervision, expanded its product line to include numerous other fruit and vegetable products. The company was eventually sold by Simon to Hunt's Foods, after which Simon retired in 1969.

He spent his later years serving in philanthropic and non-profit roles, acting as a regent on the boards of the University of California and Reed College, as well as the Los Angeles Music Center, the California School of Professional Psychology, and the Institute for Advanced Study. Simon amassed a significant art collection that is housed in the Norton Simon Museum in Pasadena, California. After his death in 1993 Simon's second wife, actress Jennifer Jones, remained an emeritus director of the Museum until her death in 2009.

== Early life ==
Simon was born in Portland, Oregon to a Jewish family, the eldest child of Myer and Lillian Simon (née Gluckman). He had two younger sisters, Evelyn and Marcia. Simon's San Francisco-born father was raised in Portland, where he eventually worked as a businessman operating his own wholesale goods store, Simon Sells For Less; Simon's mother, born in Chicago, was raised primarily in Sacramento, California.

In his youth, Simon's parents purchased a cottage in Seaside, Oregon, where he spent a significant amount of his childhood. His mother died in Seaside when Simon was fourteen of an acute digestive disorder related to type 1 diabetes. Following his mother's death, Simon's father lost the majority of his money during the Great Depression, which harshly impacted his goods store.

When he was sixteen, Simon relocated with his father and siblings to San Francisco, where they moved into his aunt and uncle's home. There, Simon attended Lowell High School, graduating in 1923. In 1925, at his father's insistence, he enrolled in the University of California, Berkeley.

== Business career ==
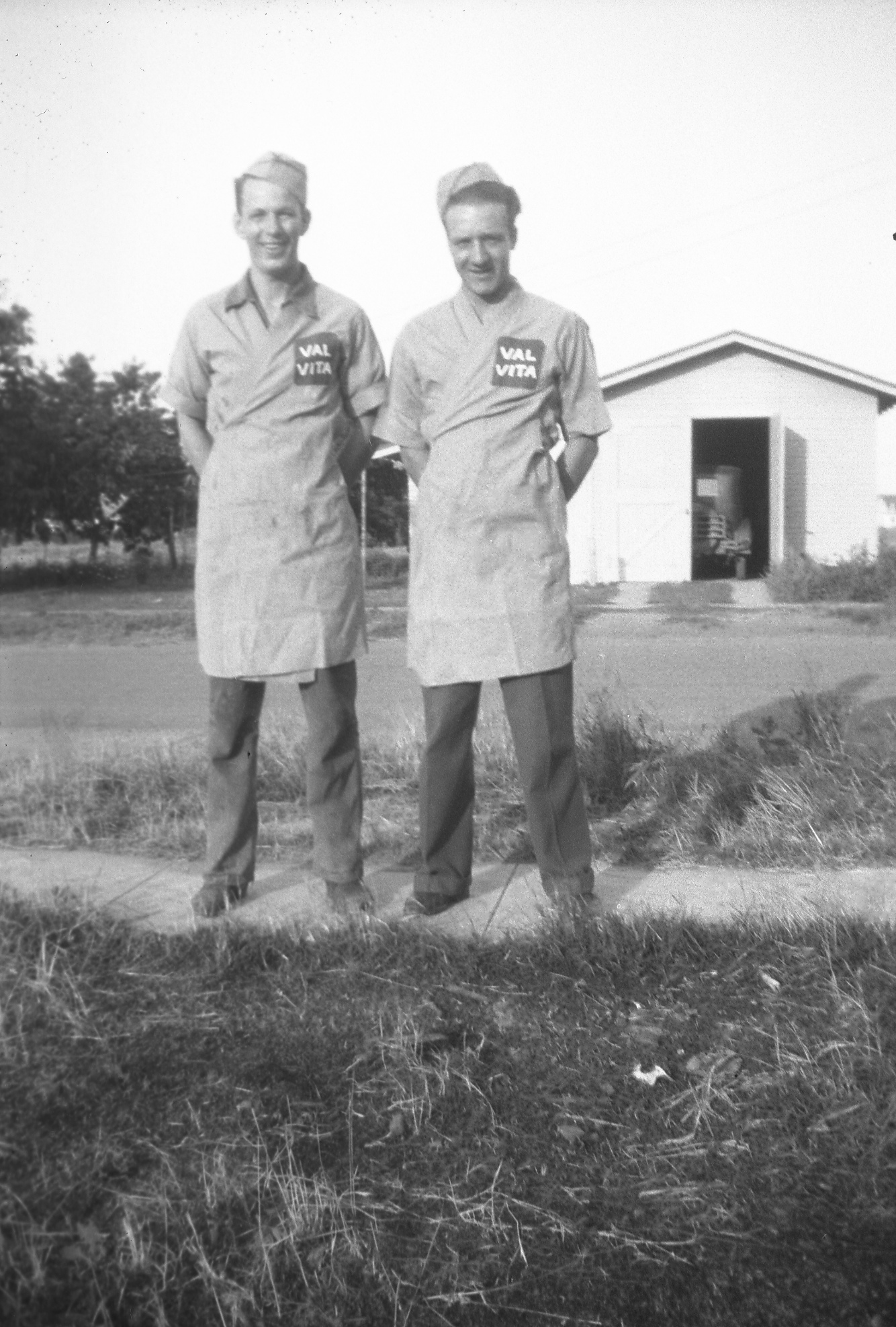
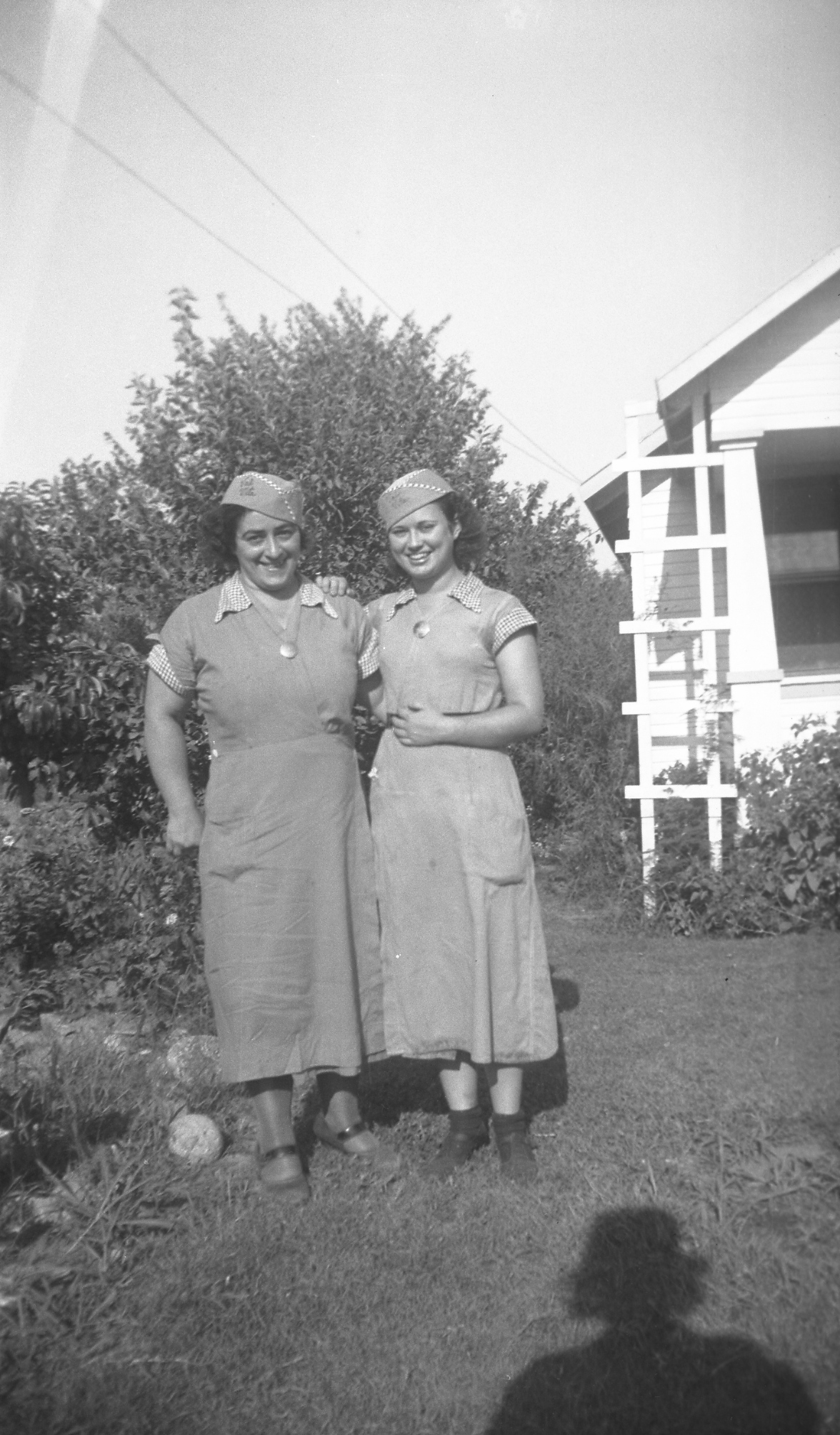
Workers at Val Vita, which later became Hunt Foods, in Fullerton, California (c. 1940)

Simon left Berkeley after just six weeks to start a sheet metal distribution company. He enjoyed early success and invested $7,000 in 1927 in an orange juice bottling plant in Fullerton, California, which was insolvent, and renamed it Val Vita Food Products Company. He soon added other fruit and vegetables to the product lines and purchased canning equipment.

As one of the first of his significant corporate moves, Simon sold Val Vita to Hunt's Foods in return for a controlling interest in the combined business. By 1943 he changed the company's name to Hunt Food and Industries and ran it with strict cost-controls and an unorthodox approach to marketing. During and after World War II, Simon focused on product visibility. Uncharacteristically for a food company at the time, he acquired full-page advertisements in Vogue and Life magazines with full-color photos of Hunt's ketchup bottles and tomato sauce cans. His aggressive advertising ensured the company's slogan "Hunt for the best" was prominent. His marketing strategy worked, and by 1945 Hunt Foods became a household name and one of the largest food processing businesses on the West Coast.

With the growing profits from Hunt Foods, he began buying stock in other undervalued companies with growth potential, many of which were still undervalued following the loss of confidence in equities after the Great Depression. He diversified through acquisition into well known businesses such as McCall's Publishing, the Saturday Review of Literature, Canada Dry Corporation, Max Factor cosmetics, the television production company Talent Associates, and Avis Car Rental, through his holding company Norton Simon Inc. Norton Simon Inc. was formed in 1968 through the merger of Hunt, McCalls, and Canada Dry. Many of these businesses had extensive interests outside the United States. Norton Simon Inc. was later acquired by Esmark in 1983, which merged with Beatrice Foods the next year. Beatrice was sold to ConAgra Foods, Inc. in 1990.

== Art collection ==
The Norton Simon Museum in Pasadena

Simon accumulated a significant private art collection which included works of the Impressionists, Old Masters, modern and native art. In the 1960s, he spent $6 million on artworks – an inventory of slightly less than 800 objects – and real estate – a building at 18 East 79th Street – from the Duveen Gallery in Manhattan, which specialized in old masters. Scholars including the critic Clement Greenberg and the Metropolitan Museum of Art curator Theodore Rousseau studied the Duveen purchases for Simon and were able to identify numerous misattributions. Simon ended up selling much of the collection and only kept around 130 objects, primarily paintings, a handful of sculptures, a few porcelains, and a cape purportedly worn by Charles IV of Spain. However, his collection holds three signed Rembrandt paintings, considered highly important works among those of Rembrandt in Southern California.

Simon served as a trustee of the Los Angeles County Museum of History, Science and Art and supported the development of the LA County Museum of Art. Simon initially lent most of his art collection to that Museum although as it expanded he pioneered the "museum without walls" concept by actively lending his collection to different museums around the world.

In 1972, Simon bought a tenth-century South Indian bronze Nataraja, or dancing Shiva, from New York dealer Ben Heller for $900,000. The Indian government declared that the statue had been stolen from a temple in Tamil Nadu and smuggled abroad. Although Simon was quoted in The New York Times on May 12, 1973, as saying, Hell yes, it was smuggled. I spent between $15 and $16 million in the last two years on Asian art, and most of it was smuggled. He later vehemently denied the quote in the May 13, 1973, edition of the Los Angeles Times, declaring that the work had been legally imported into the United States. In the same Los Angeles Times article, he stated, "As a collector deeply and emotionally involved in art, I deplore the rape of art treasures of any country." In 1976, Simon reached an amicable agreement with the Union of India whereby he agreed to return the Nataraja. In exchange, the Indian government agreed that Simon could keep and display the bronze in his museum for nine years first.

Seeking a permanent home for his collection of over 4,000 objects, in 1972 he welcomed an overture from the financially troubled Pasadena Museum of Modern Art. He ultimately assumed control and naming rights, and in 1974 it was renamed the Norton Simon Museum. In 1987, the University of California, Los Angeles, announced an "agreement in principle" with Simon for the transfer to the university of the art collection owned by two Simon foundations – the Norton Simon Foundation and the Norton Simon Art Foundation. The plan was to keep most of collection in Pasadena, administered by UCLA, the Simon board and the Norton Simon Foundation. The university was to build a separate museum facility on campus for part of the collection. However, Simon withdrew his offer three months after the announcement was made.

== Later years ==
In 1969, his son Robert Simon died by suicide, leaving Donald (Norton's other son), Lucille, and Norton shocked. In 1970, he and wife Lucille Ellis divorced. In 1971, he married actress Jennifer Jones, the widow of David O. Selznick. He retired from active involvement in his business in 1969. He accepted appointments to the University of California Board of Regents, the Carnegie Commission on the Future of Higher Education, the boards of Reed College (in his hometown of Portland), the Los Angeles Music Center, the California School of Professional Psychology at Alliant International University, and the Institute for Advanced Study.

In 1970, Simon opposed U.S. Senator George Murphy's bid for a second term in the Republican primary. Murphy won renomination, but lost the seat in the general election to the Democrat John V. Tunney, as Republican Ronald Reagan was winning a second term as governor.

== Death ==
Simon was diagnosed in 1984 with the neurological disorder Guillain–Barré syndrome, although he remained active in the Norton Simon Museum. He died of pneumonia at his home in the Bel Air section of Los Angeles on June 2, 1993.

== Sources ==
- Muchnic, Suzanne (1998). Odd Man in: Norton Simon and the Pursuit of Culture. Los Angeles: University of California Press. ISBN 978-0-520-20643-4.
