= Leslie Geary =

American naval architect

Leslie Edward "Ted" Geary (1885 - May 19, 1960) was a naval architect who grew up in Seattle, Washington. He designed and raced numerous competitive sailing vessels, and also designed commuter yachts, fishing boats, tug boats, and wooden-hulled freighters.

== Designing and racing ==
Geary was born in 1885, in Atchison, Kansas, and moved to Seattle with his parents in 1892. He exhibited an early attraction to water-related activities. In 1899, at age 14, he, along with a friend, designed and built the 24-foot centerboard racing sloop Empress.

Four years later, with lifelong friends Dean and Lloyd Johnson, Geary designed and built Empress II, another 24-foot centerboard racing sloop. With Geary at the helm, she was never defeated in local races. While a sophomore at the University of Washington, he designed Spirit, a 42-foot LOA (length overall) racing sloop for the Seattle Yacht Club. Spirit would successfully challenge the Canadian Yacht Alexandra for the Dunsmir Cup in 1907. Geary's success attracted the attention of several prominent Seattle businessmen who at Geary's suggestion would finance his education as a naval architect at the Massachusetts Institute of Technology.

== Geary's boats ==
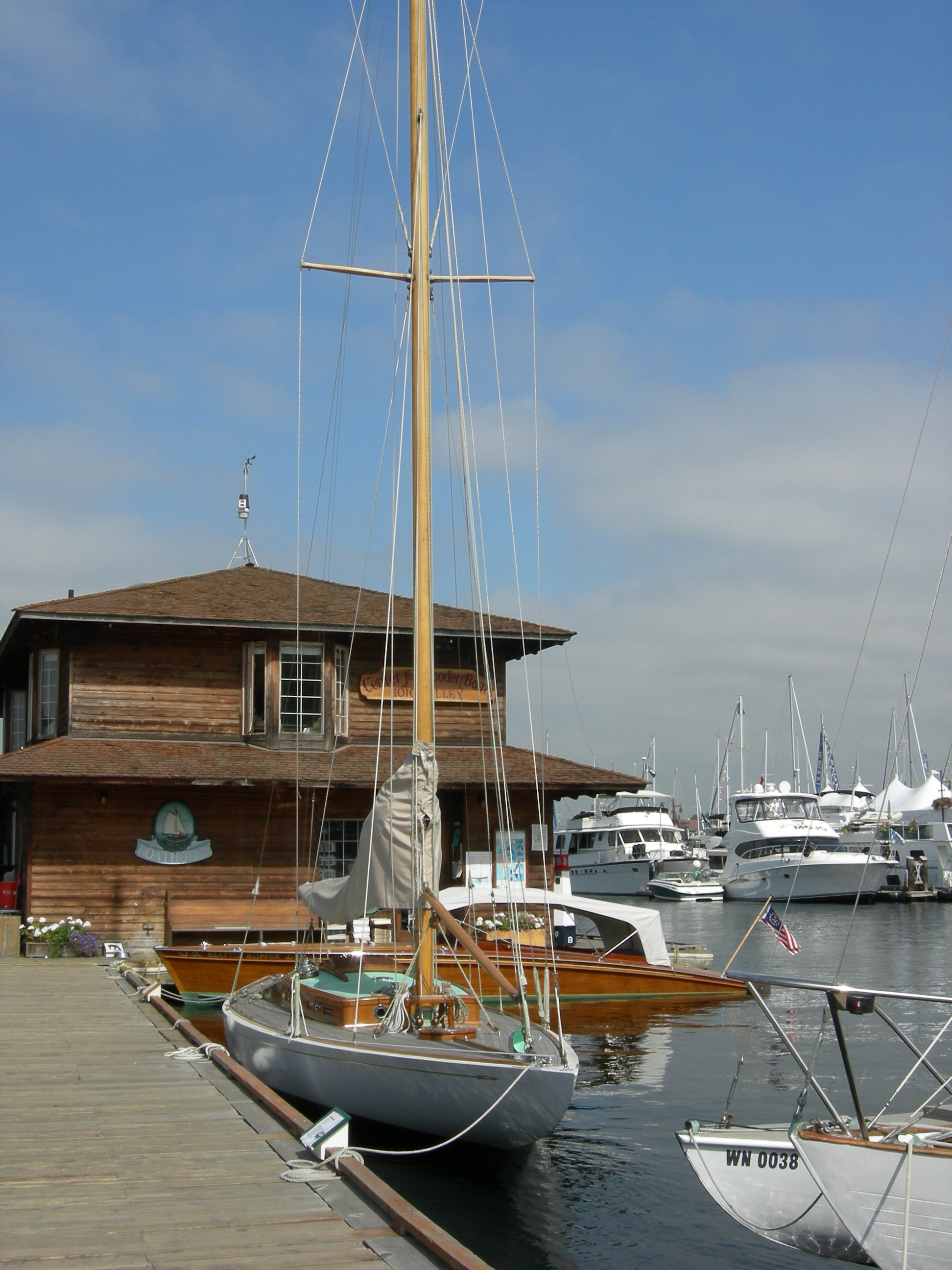
Pirate, 2007, moored at Seattle's Center for Wooden Boats.

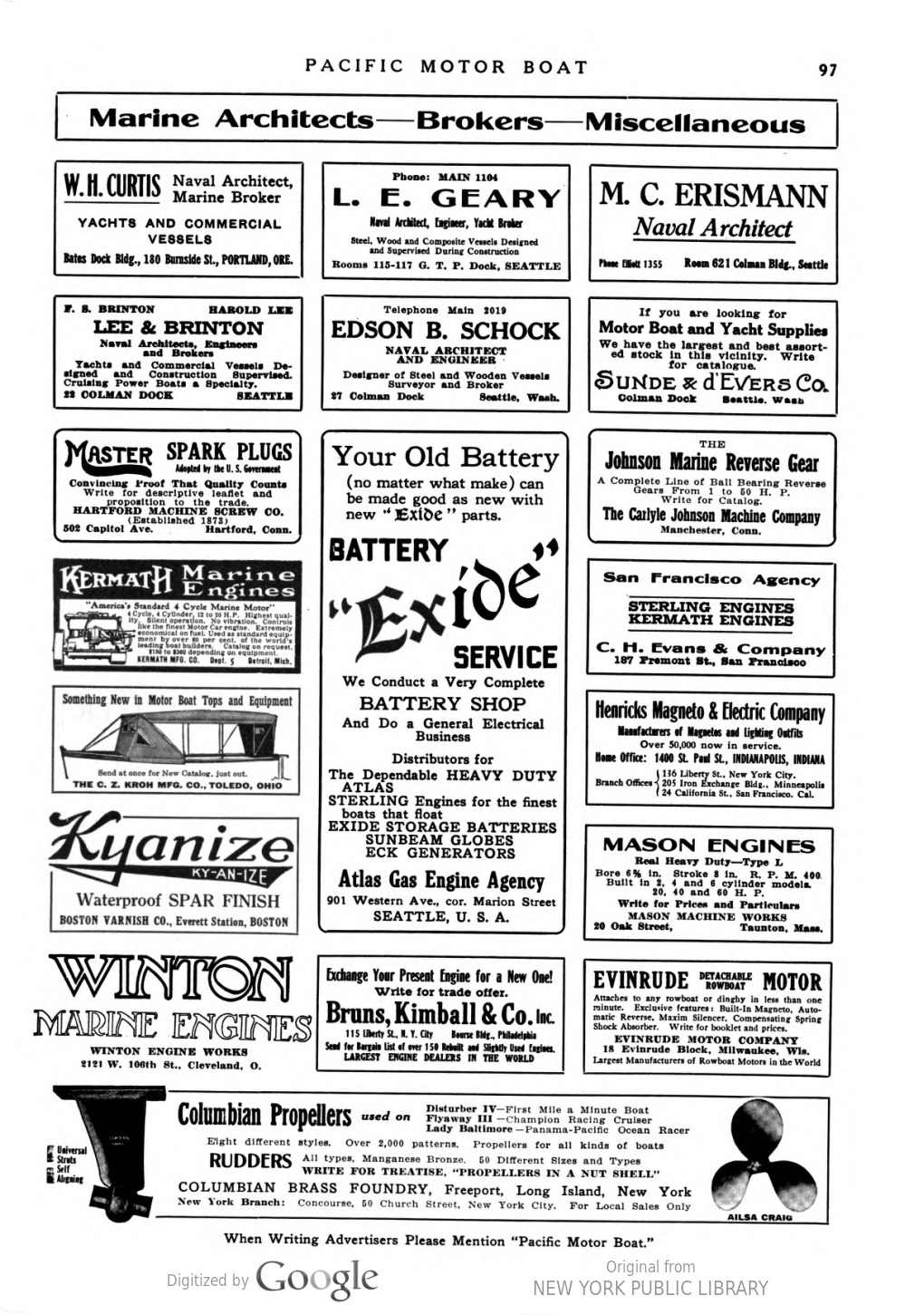
Ads from Pacific Motor Boat 1915 includes L.E. Geary

Geary would design several more competitive sailing vessels and crewed on many others in his long career. Among his designs are Sir Tom, an "R" class boat that dominated the racing circuit along the West Coast for three decades; Katedna, later Red Jacket, a 62-foot LOA schooner which would enjoy unrivaled success in Northwest racing; and Pirate, another successful "R" class racer. In 1928 Geary would design the popular "Flattie," a one-design sail trainer that is now known as the Geary 18.

Geary started his professional career designing commercial vessels, including Chickamauga, the first diesel-powered tug in the United States, commercial and fishing vessels, and during World War I, large 330-foot wooden-hulled freighters.

Geary also designed fast commuter yachts such as the 55-foot LOA Geoduck built in 1913 by the Johnson Brothers and Blanchard for W. G. Norris and the 43-foot LOA Winifred built in 1921 by the N. J. Blanchard Boat Building Company.

== Larger yachts ==
His larger yachts, beginning with the 100-foot LOA Helori built in 1912 by the Johnson Brothers and Blanchard for O. O. Denny, and the 82-foot LOA Sueja built in 1919 at the Tregoning yard for Captain James Griffiths would lead to the classic large yachts of the 1920s and 1930s. These include:

- Katedna schooner now Red Jacket, 72 foot LOA, first yacht built by N.J. Blanchard Boat Co., Seattle, 1920. Based in Tacoma since 1959. Built for Fred H. Baxter of Seattle.
- Wanda—90-foot LOA, triple screw cruiser built in 1922 by the N. J. Blanchard Boat Building Company for C. D. Stimson. She is based in Sausalito.
- Samona—115-foot LOA, built by N. J. Blanchard in 1923 for California oil magnate and developer W. J. Hole.
- Westward—86-foot LOA, built in 1924 by J. A. Martinolich at Dockton for Campbell Church, Sr. Westward is based in Seattle.
- Sueja III—122-foot LOA, built in 1926 at owner Captain James Griffiths’ own yard in Eagle Harbor. Now named Mariner III, she works seasonally out of New York and Florida as a charter yacht.
- Malibu—100-foot LOA, built in 1926 at N. J. Blanchard's yard for Mrs. Kay Rindge and Mrs. Rhoda Adamson. Malibu has undergone major upgrades and restoration. She is owned by John Jacobi of Seattle and is used for private cruises.
- Principia—96-foot LOA, built in 1928 for San Francisco yachtsman L. A. Macomber by Lake Union Drydock Company. She was the only single screw version of the four 96-foot sister ships. Principia was purchased by the Independence Seaport Museum of Philadelphia, Pennsylvania in 1993, whereupon they embarked on a major upgrade and restoration program. The museum ran into financial difficulties and sold the yacht at the end of 1999. She is owned by Principia 1928 LLC, and is home ported in Newport, RI.
- Blue Peter—96-foot LOA, built in 1928 for Seattle architect John Graham Sr. by Lake Union Drydock Company. She was purchased in 1947 by H. W. McCurdy. Blue Peter has undergone major upgrades and restoration. She is owned by Chuck Barbo, and is based in Seattle.
- Electra—96-foot LOA, built in 1930 for A. W. Leanard, then president of Puget Sound Power and Light, by Lake Union Dry Dock Company. She is chartered from Newport Harbor, California.
- Canim—96-foot LOA, built in 1930 for Col. C. B. Blethen, owner of The Seattle Times, by Lake Union Drydock Company. Canim is homeported in Harbor Springs, Michigan
- Cora Marie—107-foot LOA, built in 1924 by Boeing Aircraft Company in Vancouver, British Columbia. Changes owners and became "Seyelyn II" and later seized in by US Customs, turned over to the US Navy. Purchased by the Aluminum Company of Canada for use as a ferry - renamed "Nechako". Purchased in 1983 and returned to "Cora Marie"as yacht.
- Infanta—120-foot LOA, a steel-hulled cruiser built in 1930 for actor John Barrymore by the Craig Shipbuilding of Long Beach, California. Known as Thea Foss since her purchase by Foss Maritime of Seattle in 1950, she is now owned and operated by Foss' parent company Saltchuk Resources Inc.
- Samona II—147-foot LOA, a steel-hulled long-range cruiser built in 1931 by the Craig Shipbuilding Company for W. J. Hole.
- Stranger—135-foot LOA, built in 1938 for Capt. Fred L Lewis, by Lake Union Drydock Company. She was used secretly by the Office of Strategic Services for charting the Pacific region prior to World War II. She was owned later by the Scripps Institute and is reportedly derelict in Beaumont, Texas.

== Commercial Vessels ==
- Celtic and the Chacon - 72-foot LOA, salmon cannery tenders built in 1912 by Johnson Brothers and Blanchard in Seattle for Fidalgo Island Packing Company.
- Chickamauga Built in 1915 for the Pacific Tow Boat Company, Chickagmauga was the first American-designed and built diesel-powered tugboat in the United States.

== Later career and death ==
Geary moved to Southern California in 1932, attempting to attract additional wealthy clients. But with the Depression lasting throughout the 1930s, he received few commissions for yachts, the exception being Stranger and the 53-foot LOA Tri-Cabin cruiser Almar (later renamed Rachel Fox and Santina) built in 1937 at Lake Union Drydock Company. By the time he went to work at Craig Ship Building Company in 1939 to conduct stability testing during World War II, his career was near its end.

Ted Geary died on May 19, 1960.

== See also ==
- Pat Pending, another of Geary's boats
