= Pat Pending =

Yacht

Pat Pending is a fifty-foot trunk-cabin motor yacht that was designed by Ted Geary, and was built in 1929 by Lake Union Dry Docks in Seattle, Washington. The boat was originally owned by Lloyd Bacon, a film director made famous for films such as Moby Dick and 42nd Street. Pat Pending was then purchased in 1940 by a San Francisco Bay Area patent attorney named Don Owen, who planned to use the boat for recreational purposes. However, once World War II broke out in the Pacific theater, she was drafted by the U.S. Navy as a submarine net patrol boat, where she served from 1941 until 1944. After she was decommissioned, Pat Pending was then sold back to the Owen family in 1944, and is still owned by them today.

== Before the War ==
Pat Pending was originally owned by Lloyd Bacon, who bought the boat in 1929 from the Lake Union Dry Docks in Seattle, Washington. The boat was initially named Ligntnin' in honor of Bacon's father's most famous Broadway work. Originally built at 44'-3", Bacon had the boat lengthened to its present 50' in 1930 in the hopes of making it faster for offshore powerboat racing. However, Bacon was not satisfied with this alteration, and sold the boat after owning it for only two years. After several different owners, She was finally bought in 1940 by a San Francisco patent attorney named Don Owen. Owen is the one who gave her the name Pat Pending.

== World War II ==
After the attack on Pearl Harbor, all motor yachts in the San Francisco Bay area more than 40 feet long were drafted as submarine net patrol boats by the U.S. Navy. Pat Pending was stationed at the submarine depot on the Tiburon peninsula, and was given the task of guarding huge steel nets strung across the Golden Gate meant to prevent Japanese submarines from entering. The boat was painted Navy grey and outfitted with a gun on the bow and depth charges on the middle deck, making it an official Navy vessel. However, after a few years, the yachting navy was replaced by real Navy vessels, and Pat Pending was decommissioned. After serving in the War from December 9, 1941, to July 1944, she was repurchased by Don Owen for $100.

== Pat Pending today ==
Following her decommission from the Navy, Don Owen gave the boat a major rebuild in 1945 to restore Pat Pending to her pre-Navy condition. After his death in 1973, Don's son Mel inherited the boat, and she is still owned and used by the Owen family today. The boat currently resides at the San Francisco Yacht Club, and is taken up to Sacrament-San Joaquin River Delta for recreational cruising during the summer. In June 1997, Pat Pending was found sinking at her bow, at her berth in Belvedere. Before she could sink all the way to the bottom of the Bay, she was towed to Sausalito and hauled out of the water, clearly needing major repairs. The repairs and remodeling of Pat Pending took three and a half years to complete.
