= Chacín =

Chacín is a surname. Notable people with the surname include:

- Alejandro Chacín (born 1993), Venezuelan baseball player
- Gustavo Chacín (born 1980), Venezuelan baseball player
- Jhoulys Chacín (born 1988), Venezuelan-American baseball player
- María Teresa Chacín (born 1945), Venezuelan singer
- Pedro Itriago Chacín (1875–1936), Venezuelan lawyer, professor, politician, and diplomat
- Ramón Rodríguez Chacín (born 1951), Venezuelan politician

== See also ==
- Chacón, another surname
