= Westward (series) =

Westward is a series of Tycoon video games developed by Sandlot Games, the makers of the Tradewinds series.

== Westward ==
Westward
- Developer(s): Sandlot Games
- Publisher(s): Sandlot Games
- Platform(s): Windows, Adobe Flash
- Release: 2006
- Genre(s): Tycoon Game
- Mode(s): Single-player

=== Plot ===
The game is a strategy game set in the Old West and revolves around a slew of characters making a name for themselves in various towns. These include Hope River, Lightning Bluff, and Paradise Falls. The main antagonist of the game is Doc Vostrikov, a Russian prospector who, along with his henchmen the Copperhead Gang, swindles these settlers.

=== Gameplay ===
The player controls various characters as they build up their settlements, defend themselves from bandits, and unlock new buildings. The story begins at Camp Chippewa, where new players are tutored. As the game progresses, the player must keep an eye out for bandits, plagues, and natural disasters. To fight bandits, the player must hire gunslingers from a saloon or a sheriff and deputies. The game contains many puns on Old West pop culture.

== Westward II : Heroes of the Frontier ==
Westward II
- Developer(s): Sandlot Games
- Publisher(s): Sandlot Games
- Platform(s): Windows
- Release: 9 April 2008
- Genre(s): Tycoon Game
- Mode(s): Single-player

=== Plot ===
Set after the previous game, the town of Hope River is suddenly destroyed. Fleeing residents bring tales of Doc Vostrikov, the "Mad Russian", who once again tries to stop further expansion with the help of his cronies—the Copperhead Gang. Three pioneers help these refugees find new homes and expand into new communities by establishing new settlements.

=== Gameplay ===
The player controls one of the three pioneers, each giving a special bonus in game. The game starts with the hero, that expands the city by building using wood and gold. When achieving certain goals, the player receives rewards. As the story progresses, new characters will come, giving new missions and tasks.

There are two cities where the story takes place, Oxbow Bend and Gunslinger Gulch. The player requires experience points to unlock new buildings, which are used to expand the city. By hiring gunslingers, sheriffs and deputies the player must protect the city from bandits. The game also has secrets like hidden treasures, a new animal at the ranch, new buildings, a ferocious animal and many more.

The game also features a sandbox mode, which can be played in two modes: "Open Range" and "Disaster Challenge". In Open Range, all buildings are unlocked from the start, while in Disaster Challenge, disasters like tornadoes, earthquakes, fires and bandit attacks take place. Players must unlock new buildings using their experience and resources as the difficulty increases.

== Westward III : Gold Rush ==
Westward III
- Developer(s): Sandlot Games
- Publisher(s): Sandlot Games
- Platform(s): Windows
- Release: 6 January 2009
- Genre(s): Tycoon Game
- Mode(s): Single-player

=== Plot ===
When gold is discovered in the Northern California wilderness, speculators flock west in hopes of striking it rich. Along the way the kind-hearted, but financially struggling Baron family (a farmer named Jake, his wife Emily, and their son Redd) welcomes three weary travelers into their home and offers them a place to rest. Grateful for their hospitality, the pioneers make a promise to repay the family for their kindness and generosity when they are settled. Unfortunately, a greedy land speculator named Silas McAllister plots to gain control of valuable land and eventually, governorship of California.

=== Gameplay ===
The gameplay is similar to Westward II. The player can choose three pioneers, each giving a special bonus in the game. The basic resources are wood and gold, which are used to build; food, used to feed the people; and water, which is required at farms and ranches.

There are two cities where the story takes place, as in Westward II. The player requires experience points to unlock new buildings, which are used to expand the city and hire gunslingers and lawmen to protect it from bandits. The game also has secrets like hidden treasures, secret buildings and many more.

The game also features a sandbox mode, which can be played in three modes: "Open Range", "Disaster Challenge" and "Bandit Showdown." In Open Range, all buildings are unlocked from the start, while in Disaster Challenge, disasters like tornadoes, earthquakes, fires and bandit attacks take place. Players must unlock new buildings using the experience and resources they receive as the difficulty increases. In Bandit Showdown, bandit attacks take place very often.

== Westward IV : All Aboard ==
Westward IV
- Developer(s): Sandlot Games
- Publisher(s): Sandlot Games
- Platform(s): Windows
- Release: 10 December 2009
- Genre(s): Tycoon Game
- Mode(s): Single-player

=== Plot ===
When the owner of the Turner Railroad Company goes missing, his children, Anne and Henry, are called upon to uncover the truth behind his disappearance.

=== Gameplay ===
The gameplay is similar to Westward II and III. The player can choose either of two pioneers, one male and one female, differing primarily (and perhaps solely) in the layout of the main town's map. The basic resources are wood and gold, which are used primarily to build; coal, for powering trains; food, to feed the people; and water, required at farms and ranches. In addition, workers may now gain skills by working a length of time at a building (for example, the lumber camp or the mine), and some buildings can be upgraded, somewhat like in the original game.

A twist is that there is now only one main town (rather than a first and then a second as in II and III). Besides the usual quests and puzzles in that town, a map is provided for connecting it to other towns along the railroad. The storyline heavily involves maintenance and control of Turner Railroad.

Another main difference is that there is no longer a saloon where the player can hire "gunslingers". Rather, they randomly show up at the train station of the player's main town (sometimes with dogs). In addition, they are referred to as "bounty hunters". If a bounty hunter shows up with a dog and is hired, the player gets the dog for free.

== Westward Kingdoms ==
Westward Kingdoms
- Developer(s): Sandlot Games
- Publisher(s): Sandlot Games
- Platform(s): Windows
- Release: 15 December 2010
- Genre(s): Tycoon Game
- Mode(s): Single-player

=== Plot ===
A medieval version of the game. There are two main characters—Prince Fenwick and Princess Catherine. When two young spoiled heirs to the throne are banished from the comforts of their royal realm, they are tasked with traveling to three neighboring kingdoms, restoring their greatness, and demonstrating to their father, the king, that they are the rightful heirs to the throne. Prince Fenwick and Princess Catherine roam the countryside as they seek the guidance of friendly Kings, Countesses, Dukes, and loyal subjects in Westward Kingdoms.

== Reviews ==
- http://www.gamezebo.com/games/westward-ii-heroes-frontier/review
- http://www.gamezebo.com/games/westward-iii-gold-rush/review
- http://www.gamezebo.com/games/westward-iv-all-aboard/review
