= Rembrandt in Southern California =

Rembrandt paintings held in collections in California, U.S.

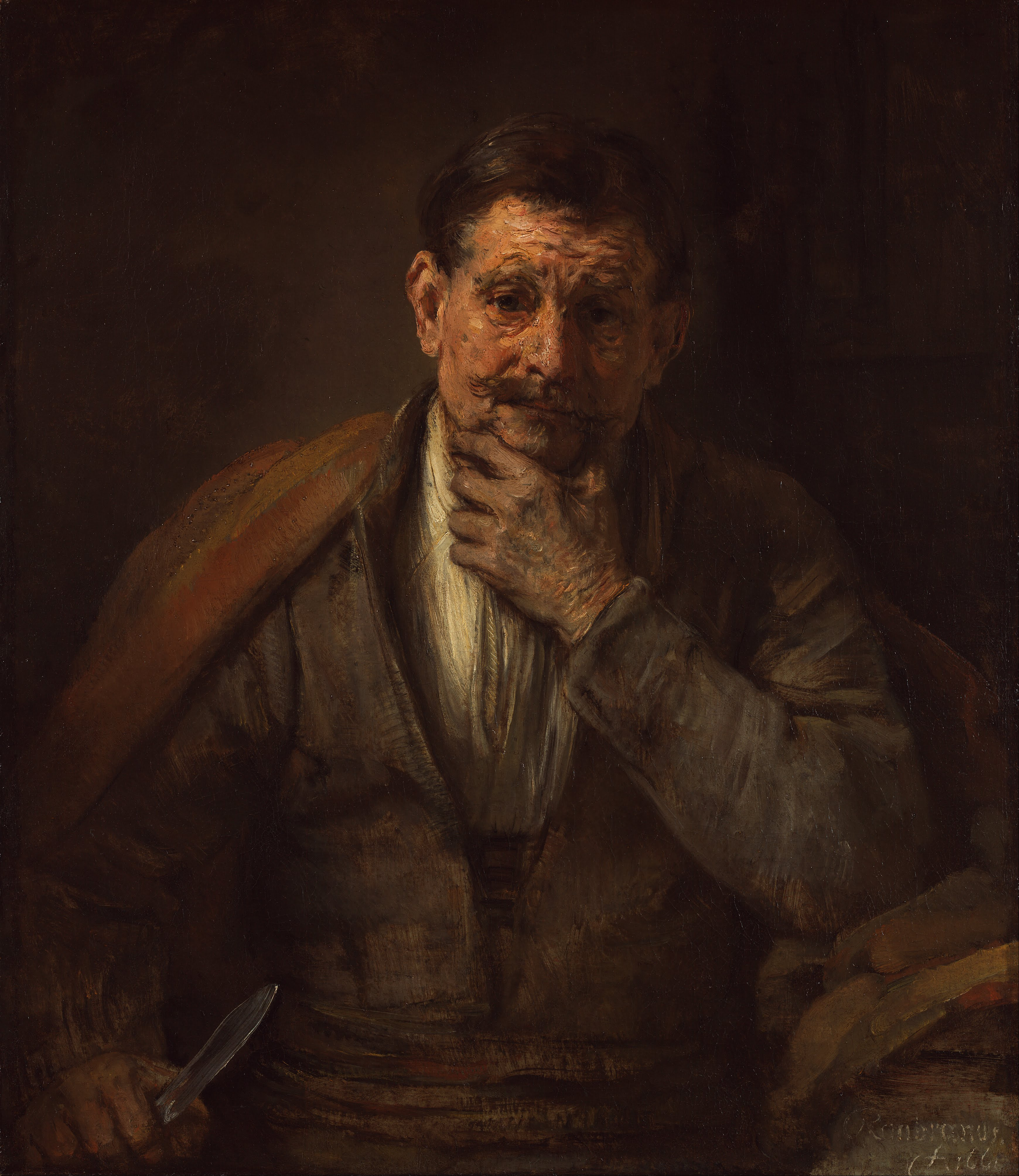
Saint Bartholomew, 1661, J. Paul Getty Museum, Los Angeles. In Southern California by 1971. Gift of J. Paul Getty

An Old Man in Military Costume, about 1630–31, Getty Museum. In Southern California by 1978

The Abduction of Europa, 1632, Getty Museum. In Southern California by 1995

Daniel and Cyrus before the Idol Bel, 1633, Getty. In Southern California by 1995

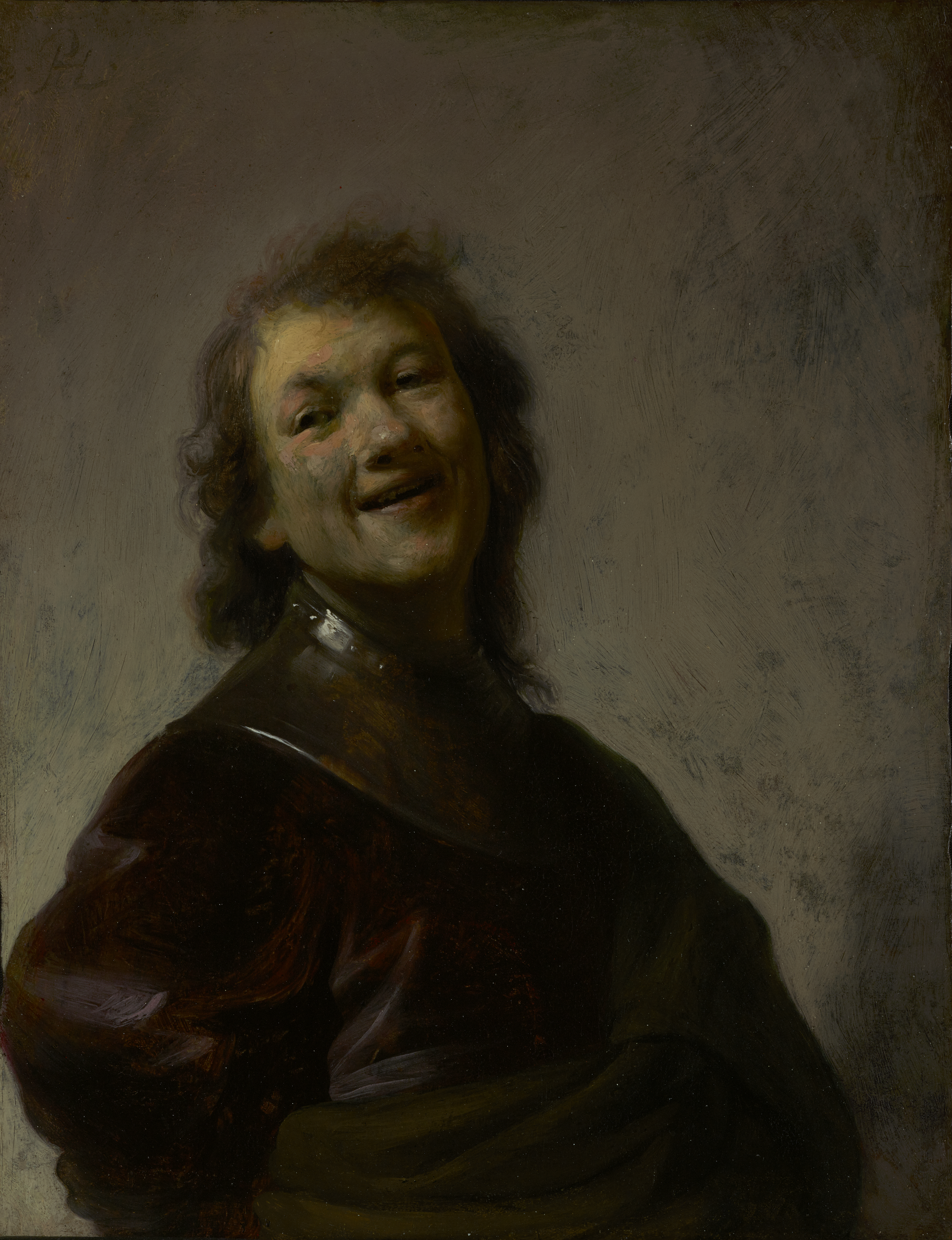
Rembrandt Laughing, about 1628, Getty Museum. In Southern California by 2013

Fourteen Rembrandt paintings are held in collections in Southern California. This accumulation began with J. Paul Getty's purchase of the Portrait of Marten Looten in 1938, and is now the third-largest concentration of Rembrandt paintings in the United States. Portrait of Marten Looten is in the Los Angeles County Museum of Art (LACMA).

== History ==
The Rembrandt Club of Pomona College in Claremont, California, was established in 1905 for the promotion and encouragement of the arts. It predates all of the major art museums of Southern California and remains active today.

In 1907, Arabella Huntington, whose Southern California home is now the Huntington Library, Art Collections, and Botanical Gardens, purchased Rembrandt's Aristotle Contemplating a Bust of Homer (1653) for her house in Paris. After her death, the painting was inherited by her son Archer M. Huntington. He sold it in 1928, the year that the Huntington Library, Art Gallery, and Botanical Gardens was established. Aristotle was eventually purchased by the Metropolitan Museum of Art of New York in 1962, for 2.3 million dollars. At the time this was the highest amount ever paid for a painting at a public or private sale.

In 1913, the Los Angeles County Museum of History, Science, and Art opened in Exposition Park. The inclusion of the three divisions had been determined in part by the Smithsonian's configuration, and there was very little art to display. In order to meet the deadline of the formal dedication ceremonies on November 6, 1913, the fine arts wing was not only hung with loans from Southern California collectors, but also with a number of works borrowed from East Coast owners. The opening of the museum was timed to coincide with the completion of the Owens Valley aqueduct—it was part of the celebratory festivities. The ready availability of water made the development of Southern California possible.

In the 20th century, collections of art that included paintings by old masters such as Rembrandt were highly sought after by many of America's business elite. Accounts in the Los Angeles Times trumpet the earliest arrivals of professed Rembrandt paintings in the Southland in 1928 and 1932.

An Elderly Jew in Fur Cap (1645) was purchased by Mr. and Mrs. Fred E. Keeler of Hollywood in 1928. President and major stockholder of the Lockheed Corporation, Keeler informed the press that he and his wife hoped to build a gallery to house their pictures adjoining their home, and open it to the public. During the fall and winter of 1934–35, the Los Angeles Sunday Times published a series entitled "Southern California's One Hundred Finest Privately Owned Paintings". The Keeler's "Rembrandt" was featured in the first edition of the series. When Mary Keeler died in 1939, she left their collection of art to the County Museum of History, Science, and Art, without restrictions.

Another purported Rembrandt, Portrait of a Woman with Oriental Headdress (1635), was acquired by Mr. and Mrs. Willitts J. Hole of Hancock Park in 1932. An early twentieth century Southern California real estate developer, Hole built a private art gallery adjoining his residence, in which the collection was arranged by nationality and lit by artificial light. In 1938, the Willitts J. Hole collection was donated by his daughter Agnes Hole Rindge to the University of California, Los Angeles. Soon after, on January 8, 1940, the Hole Rembrandt and many other paintings from the collection were installed in the UCLA Library.

Supported by scholars as genuine works by Rembrandt's hand at the time, both the Keeler and Hole pictures have since been reconsidered.

German art historian Wilhelm Valentiner published Rembrandt Paintings in America in 1931, with the inclusion of just one work in California: St. John the Baptist (1632), owned by newspaper magnate William Randolph Hearst of Los Angeles. In 1947 when the picture was owned by Marion Davies, Hearst gave the funds to Los Angeles County Museum of Art (LACMA) to purchase it, along with eighteen other works, from her. No longer considered by Rembrandt, it is presently attributed to Govert Flinck and called Portrait of a Bearded Man.

Already a well known art world figure, Wilhelm Valentiner came to Los Angeles in 1946 to assume the directorship of the precursor of the Los Angeles County Museum of Art (LACMA), the "Los Angeles County Museum". As described above, prior to a division in 1961, fine art was integrated with history and science in what is now the Natural History Museum of Los Angeles County's edifice.

In 1947, shortly after arriving in Los Angeles, Valentiner organized and curated a major loan exhibition of works by Rembrandt and fellow Dutch seventeenth-century painter Frans Hals at the County Museum. The show featured paintings from a number of Southern California private collections such as Jacob M. Heimann of Los Angeles, J. Paul Getty of Los Angeles, Mr. and Mrs. Converse M. Converse of Santa Barbara, and George Huntington Hartford II of Los Angeles; and included the Los Angeles County Museum's Portrait of Marten Looten and the Hammer Museum's Juno.

Getty gave Marten Looten to the Los Angeles County Museum in 1953, undoubtedly convinced to do so by Valentiner. Soon after the Rembrandt expert became the first director of the newly created J. Paul Getty Museum in Malibu, 1954.

Shortly after the new Los Angeles County Museum of Art (LACMA) had opened in 1961, critic Howard Taubman penned an article in the New York Times entitled "Culture Way Out West: Los Angeles Art Museum Embarks on Long Road to First-Class Status" suggesting that there was a good deal of room for improvement. "Museum leaders have calculated the cost of upgrading various areas of their collection," he states, "To achieve a No. 1 spot in Thai art...would cost only $250,000. To approach the heights of a Rembrandt repository...would cost no less than $65 million." The article also reports a rumor about a Southern California Rembrandt:

While Los Angeles may resent signs of Eastern condescension, it has not lost its sense of humor. It is still capable of chuckling about a story, possibly only a rumor, involving a Rembrandt portrait owned by Howard Ahmanson, banker and patron of the arts. Some doubt has been cast on the authenticity of the painting's attribution, and the plan, the story has it, has been worked out for a test. There is a similar Rembrandt at the National Gallery, and the one here will be carried tenderly in the next month or two to Washington, where the two paintings will be hung and studied side by side. Wouldn't it be funny, remarked a cynical fellow the other day, if some expert opined that the one in Washington is dubious? Are you laughing back there in the East?

Rembrandt, Saint Bartholomew, 1661, was sold in 1962 at a Sotheby's, London standing-room only sale. Purchased by J. Paul Getty, it is now in collection of the J. Paul Getty Museum.

In 1965, Norton Simon, a Southern California businessman and major Los Angeles County Museum of Art supporter, purchased Rembrandt's Titus at a Christie's London auction. The result was a media commotion. The painting had been knocked down by the auctioneer to an English buyer, but Simon was able to reopen the bidding by producing a letter that proved that the auctioneer had overlooked his prearranged bidding signal. A natural genius at promotion and marketing, Simon arranged the Rembrandt portrait's American debut at the National Gallery of Art in Washington, where its debarkation from the plane was filmed. Stating that "the painting has such great beauty and universal appeal that the Norton Simon Foundation has a special obligation to exhibit it in the most favorable circumstances for the widest possible enjoyment," Simon allowed the work to be on view there for six months, where it was seen by over 300,000 visitors. That June, Simon and the Rembrandt picture made the cover of Time Magazine. Disguised as a wrapped Christmas present and featuring a tag reading "To Mother", Titus made the plane trip from DC to Southern California in December 1965

In 2008 the Hammer Museum, the J. Paul Getty Museum, the Los Angeles County Museum of Art, the Norton Simon Museum, and the Timken Museum of Art collaborated on an intramural exhibition of Rembrandt paintings; they called it "Rembrandt in Southern California".
