= Chacon (1918) =

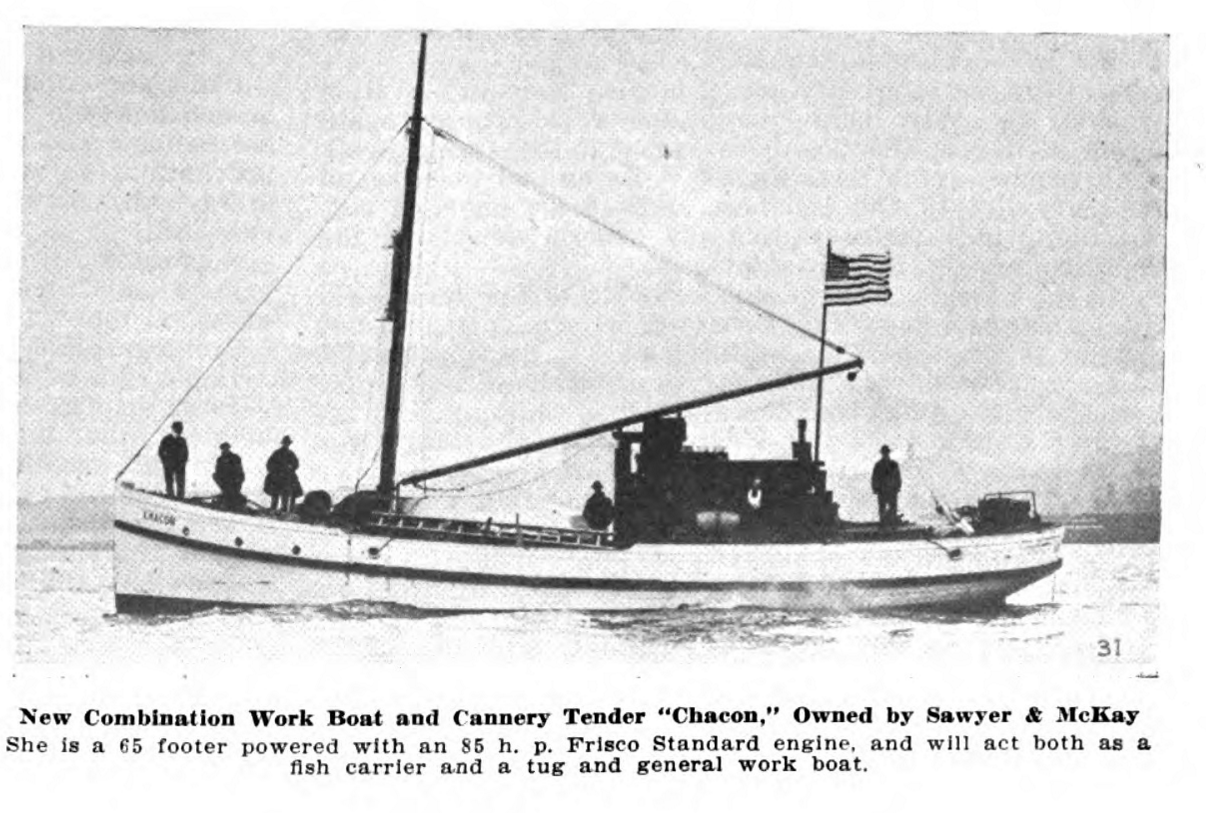

History

United States
- Name: Chacon, MV Chacon
- Namesake: Cape Chacon Alaska
- Ordered: 1918
- Builder: Tacoma, Washington
- Launched: 1918
- Completed: 1918
- In service: 1918-1937
- Out of service: 1937
- Home port: Ketchikan, Alaska
- Identification: 215992
- Fate: Lost at Sea

General characteristics
- Type: cannery tender
- Displacement: 53 long tons (54 t) Gross
- Length: 65 ft (20 m)
- Beam: 16 ft (4.9 m)
- Depth of hold: 7.6 ft (2.3 m)
- Propulsion: Single Screw Propeller
- Complement: 6

Chacon was a 65 ft (20 m) commercial vessel built in Tacoma Washington by Johnson and Waughbo in 1918. Built for service in Ketchikan Alaska as a cannery tender and tug boat, Chacon was powered by an 85 hp Frisco Standard gasoline engine.

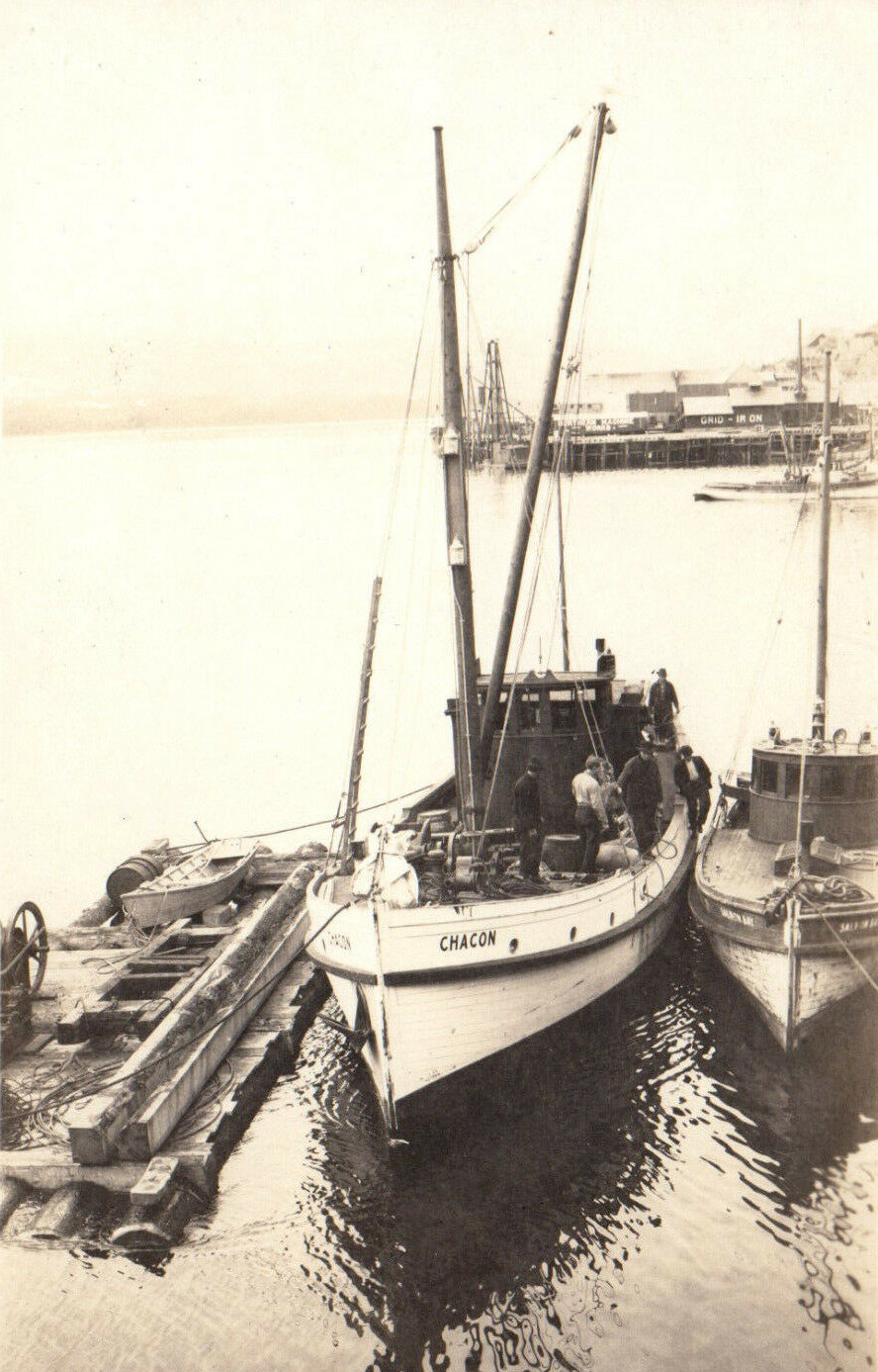

Chacon was originally owned by the Sawyer and McKay Company, owners of several fish traps near Ketchikan. Chacon was later sold to Ed J. Williams and operated as a mail and passenger boat. On April 13, 1937, Chacon was lost at sea in a gale at Cape Mudge. Her crew of six were rescued.
