= Chickamauga (tugboat) =

Wooden tugboat built in 1915

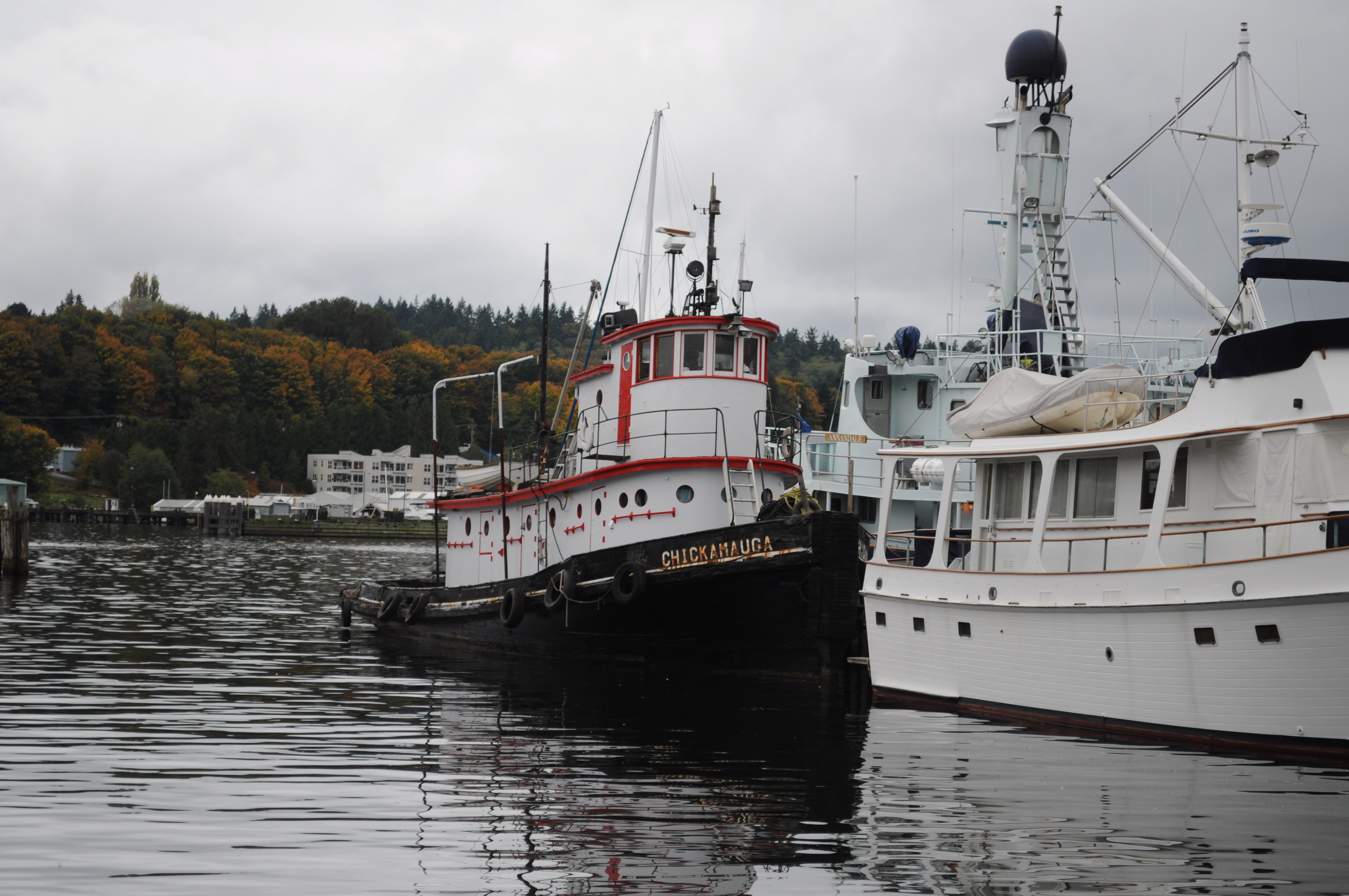
- Tugboat Chickamauga, moored in Ballard, Seattle, Washington, USA.

History

United States
- Name: Chickamauga, M/V Chickamauga
- Builder: Leslie Geary
- Launched: 1915
- Completed: 1915
- Decommissioned: 2014
- Home port: Seattle
- Identification: 213069 KFXA
- Fate: Scrapped
- Notes: first diesel tug in U.S.

General characteristics
- Type: Tug
- Tonnage: 51 long tons (52 t) Gross
- Length: 59.5 ft (18.1 m)
- Beam: 17.6 ft (5.4 m)
- Depth of hold: 8.6 ft (2.6 m)
- Propulsion: Diesel screw

Chickamauga was a wooden tugboat built in 1915 and operated in Washington throughout its service life. The boat sank on October 2, 2013, and was subsequently scrapped.

== History ==
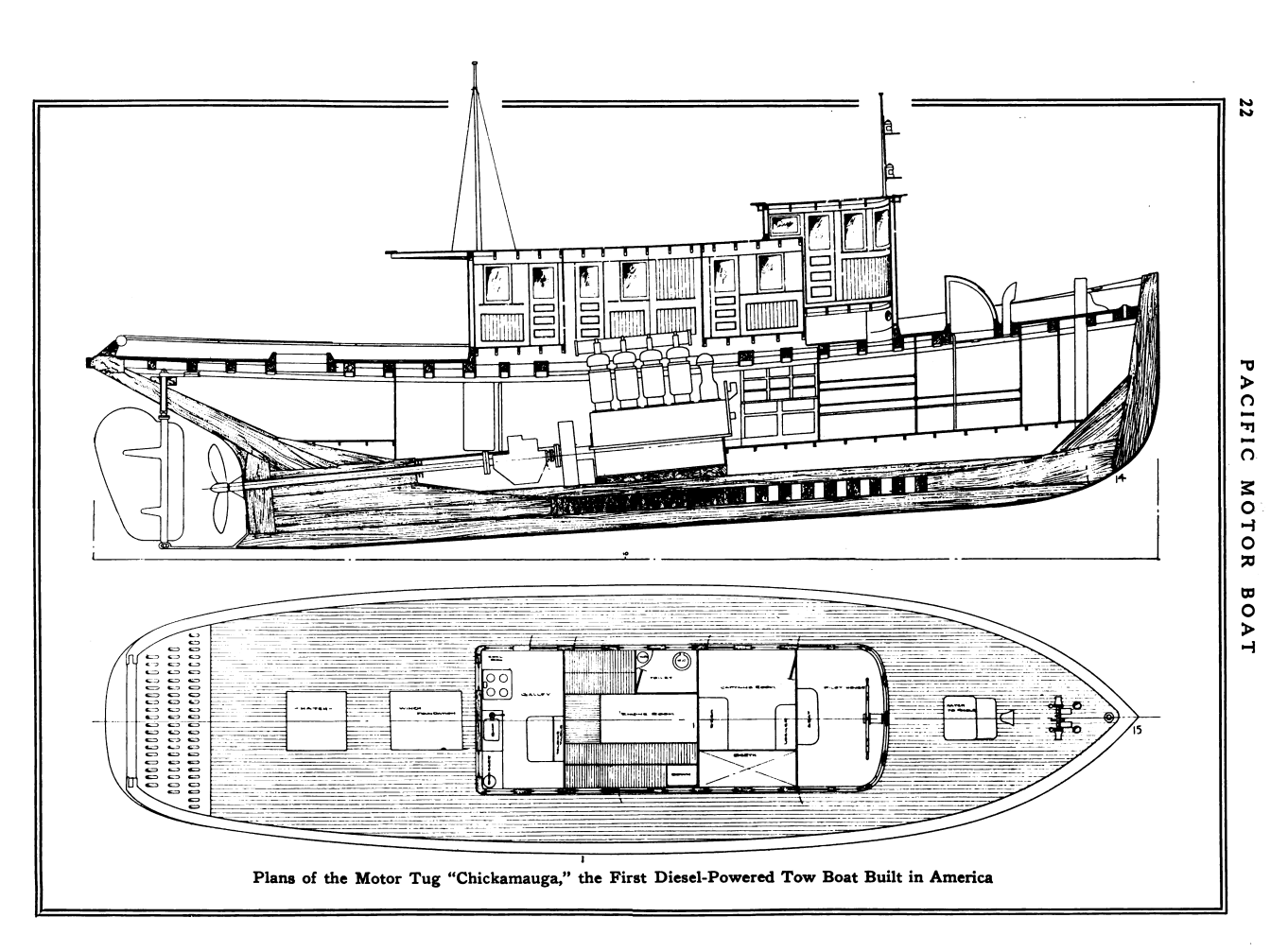
Plans from Pacific Motor Boat Magazine 1915

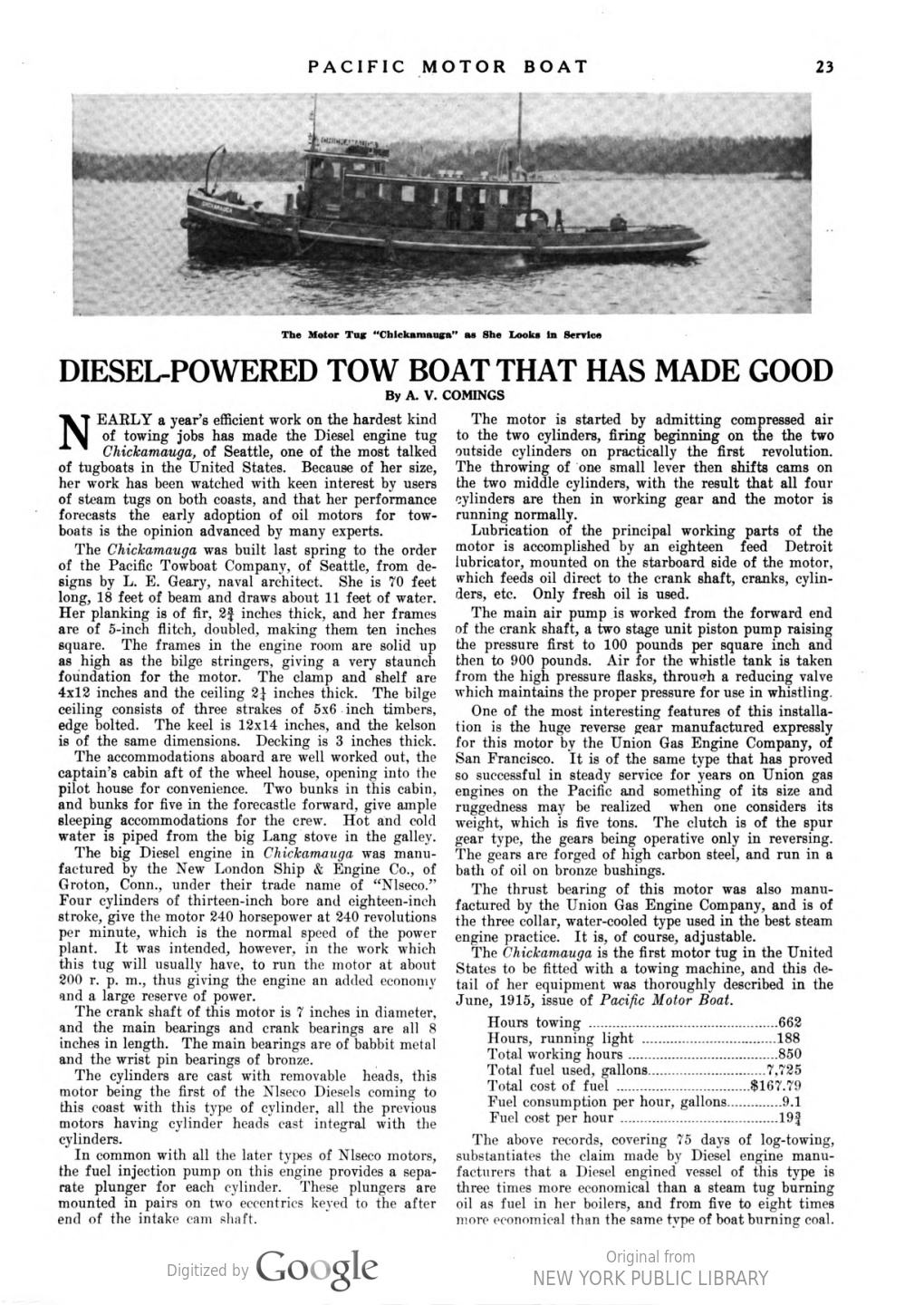
Article from Pacific Motor Boat Magazine

Chickamauga was a 70' long wooden tug boat built in Seattle Washington in 1915. Chickamauga was designed by naval architect Leslie Geary, and was the first diesel powered tugboat designed and built in the U.S.

== Sinking & demolition ==
Chickamauga sank while moored at Eagle Harbor on Bainbridge Island, Washington on October 2, 2013. It was reported to have leaked over 300 gallons of petroleum products into the harbor. The wreck was lifted from the water on October 10, 2013 by crane.

The Washington State Department of Natural Resources (DNR) took possession of the Chickamauga on January 16, 2014 and offered it to museums for possible preservation. On January 30, 2014, Chickamauga was towed to a dry dock outside Seattle to await a decision regarding its future. The boat was eventually destroyed with the use of an excavator, and the wreckage was disposed of. The helm and throttle controls, however, were salvaged and donated by the DNR to the Foss Waterway Seaport Museum in Tacoma.
