= José Chacón =

José Chacón is the name of:

- José Chacón Díaz (born 1977), Venezuelan professional racing cyclist
- José Luis Chacón (born 1971), Peruvian football (soccer) player
- José Maria Chacón (1749–1833), the last Spanish Governor of Trinidad
- José Pascual de Zayas y Chacón (1772–1827), Spanish military officer
