= MV Westward =

- MV WESTWARD (Wooden Motor Vessel)
- U.S. National Register of Historic Places
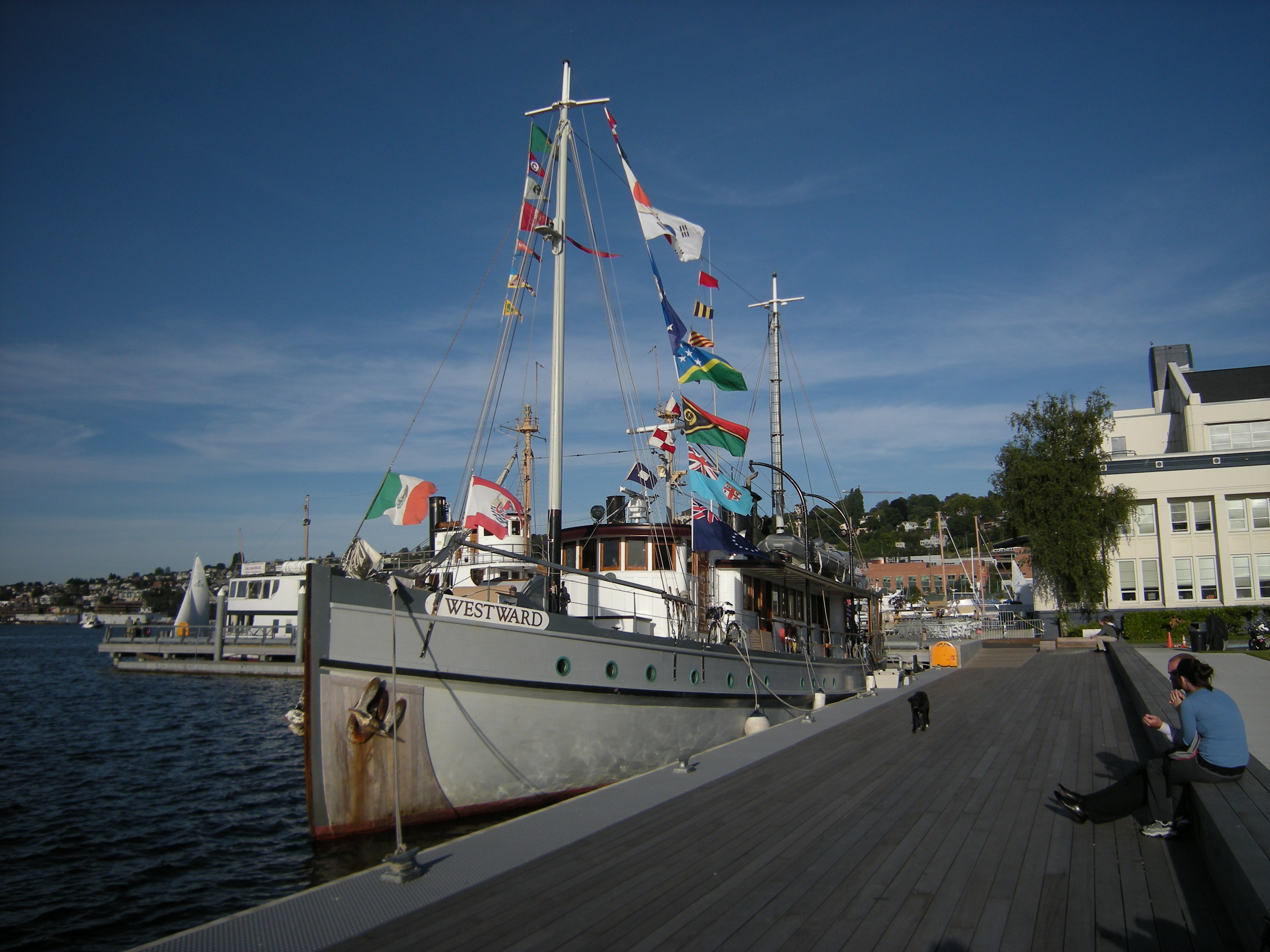
- MV Westward docked between voyages at Northwest Seaport, Seattle, Washington (2008)

- Location within Washington (state)
- Location: Seattle, Washington
- Coordinates: 47°37′41″N 122°20′1″W
- Built: 1924
- Architect: Leslie Edward "Ted" Geary, John A. Martinolich
- NRHP reference No.: 07000304
- Added to NRHP: April 12, 2007

MV Westward is an 86-foot (26 m) motor yacht, "arguably Seattle’s most famous motor yacht," originally constructed in 1924 by Ted Geary for inventor Campbell Church, Sr., and currently owned by Bill Bailey. Her home port is Friday Harbor, Washington and she is listed on the U.S. National Register of Historic Places

Westward was modeled after a salmon cannery tender and constructed—around a 1923 Atlas-Imperial diesel engine—at the Martinolich Shipyard on Maury Island near Seattle. She was designed to travel the Inside Passage along the British Columbia coast to Alaska. Her construction marked a turning point in Geary's career: previously he had built workboats; from this time he built yachts.

In her early years, expeditions on the Westward were hunting expeditions, with "a Norwegian whale gun shooting harpoons fitted with time fuse bombs, a 10-horse gasoline winch with thirty-six hundred feet [1097 meters] of quarter-inch [0.6 cm] plow steel cable as a fishing line, and all of the accessories for 'scrapping it out' with fifty-ton [about 45 metric tonnes] whales". These expeditions were led by Church's son Campbell Church, Jr., who founded The Alaska Coast Hunting and Cruising Company. The Churches ended up owning numerous notable motor yachts. Besides the Westward were the Nooya, Deerleap, Caroline, Alarwee, Acania, Onawa, Malibu, Cadrew, Electra, Olympus, and Taconite. Campbell Jr. made extensive films of his journeys.

Among the many people who have traveled aboard Westward are A. C. Gilbert, inventor of the Erector Set, George Eastman (of Eastman Kodak), banker Paul Mellon, George Pabst of Pabst Brewing Company, investor E.F. Hutton and his wife Marjorie Merriweather Post, Walt Disney, John Wayne, Phil Harris, Fibber McGee & Molly and Amos & Andy.

During World War II, Westward was pressed into military service. Don Gumpertz bought Westward in 1967 and circumnavigated the globe in it in the 1970s. Hugh Reilly, once the owner of a fleet of fishing trawlers in the Alaska seafood industry (coincidentally named Westward Trawlers), bought Westward in 1993. From 1997 to 2004 he returned Her to her roots as a vessel for Alaska tourism (minus the blood sports). He then put the boat through a major refitting before taking her on a two-year tour of the Pacific, from which he returned in early September 2008. After a brief visit to Puget Sound, he took her down the West Coast to Mexico and then in May 2009 crossed for the South Pacific.

Westward is still powered by her original 1923 Atlas-Imperial diesel engine. which provides 110 horsepower and gives her a cruising speed of eight knots. http://classicyacht.org/westward/?page_id=26

Westward is currently owned and operated by Bill Bailey of Friday Harbor, WA as part of the Pacific Catalyst II tour business.
