= Cannery tender =

Boat used to transport fish hauls and protect traps in 20th-century North America

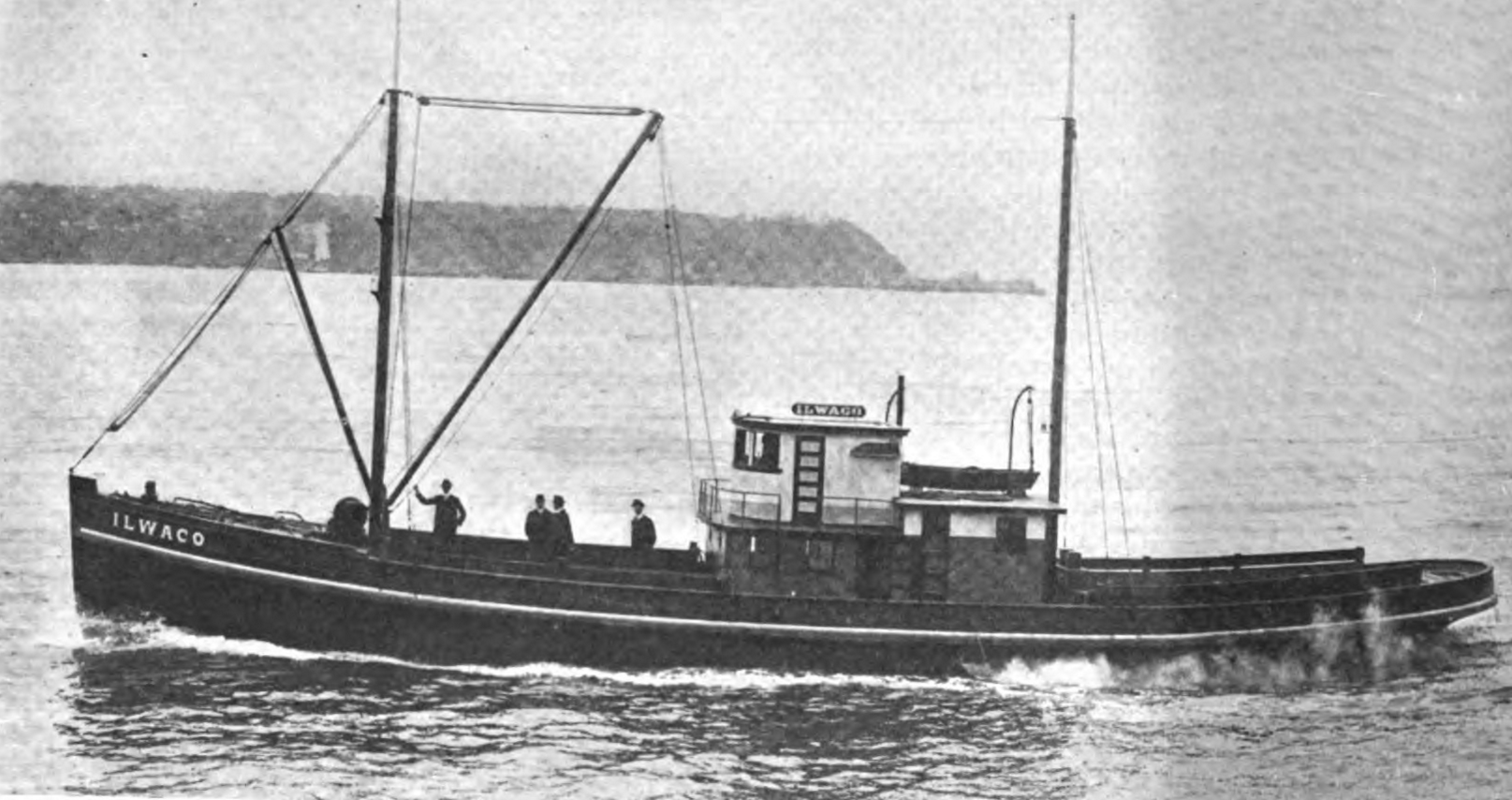
The 96-foot (29.3 m) Puget Sound motor cannery tender Ilwaco on 1 August 1918 (from Pacific Motor Boat magazine, 1918).

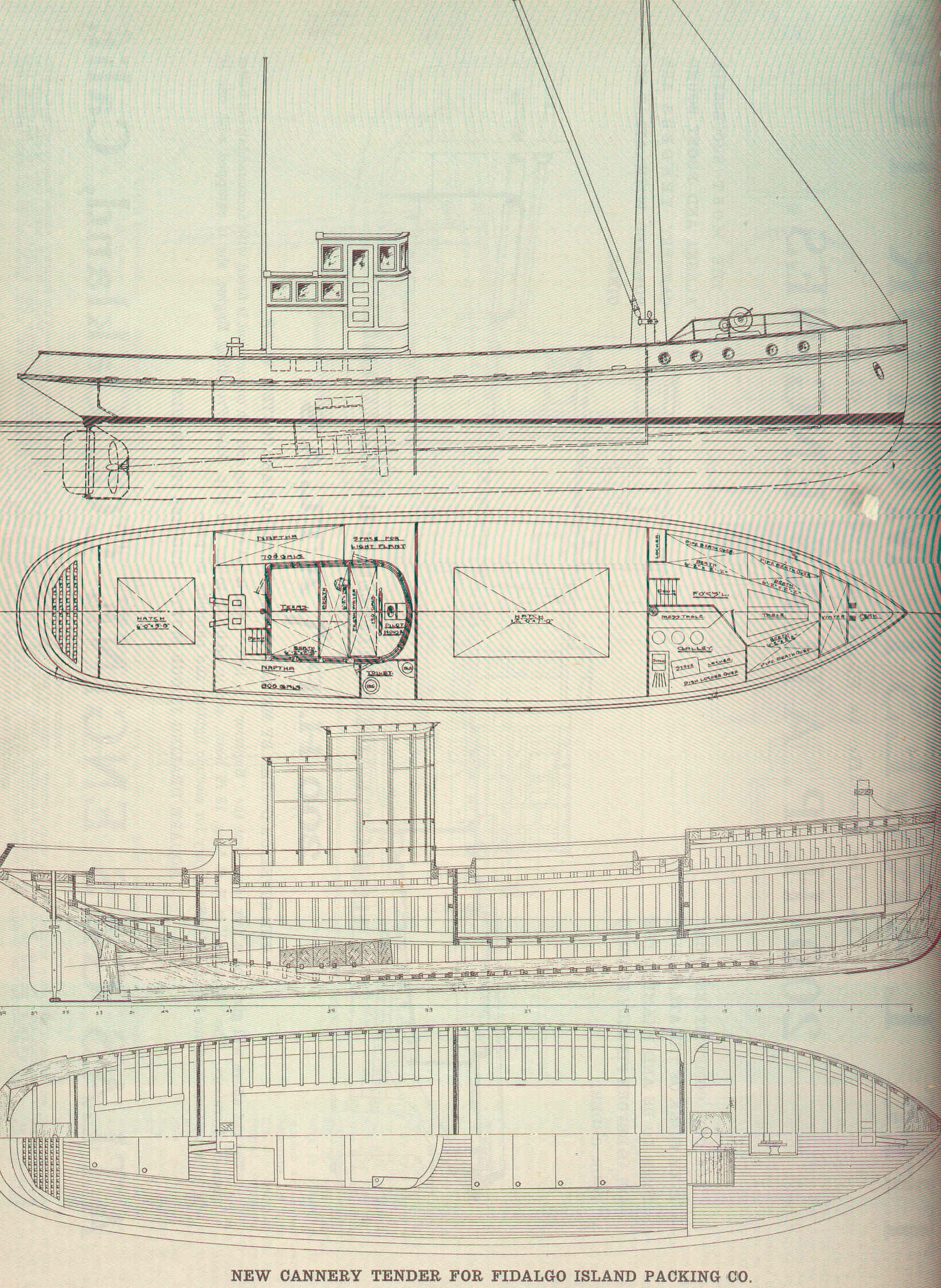
FMIB 44581 A 1912 line drawing of a "new cannery tender for [the] Fidalgo Island Packing Company" (from Pacific Fisherman Annual Statistical Review, 1912).

A cannery tender was a type of commercial fishing vessel operated by salmon canneries in the early to mid- 20th century. Most commonly used in the Pacific Northwest and Alaska, cannery tenders transported fish from cannery-owned fish traps to canneries. Cannery tenders also transported men and supplies to set up and maintain the fish traps and patrolled the area around fish traps to protect them from fish pirates.

After commercial fish traps were banned in Washington in 1934 and in Alaska in 1959, many of the cannery tenders were sold to private operators for use as fishing boats or towing vessels.

== Surviving examples ==
Chacon was one of two identical cannery tenders operated by Fidalgo Island Packing Company. Chacon can be visited at her permanent location in Chugiak, Alaska.
