= Chacon (1912) =

Former wooden vessel

Coordinates: 61.3751°N 149.5036°W

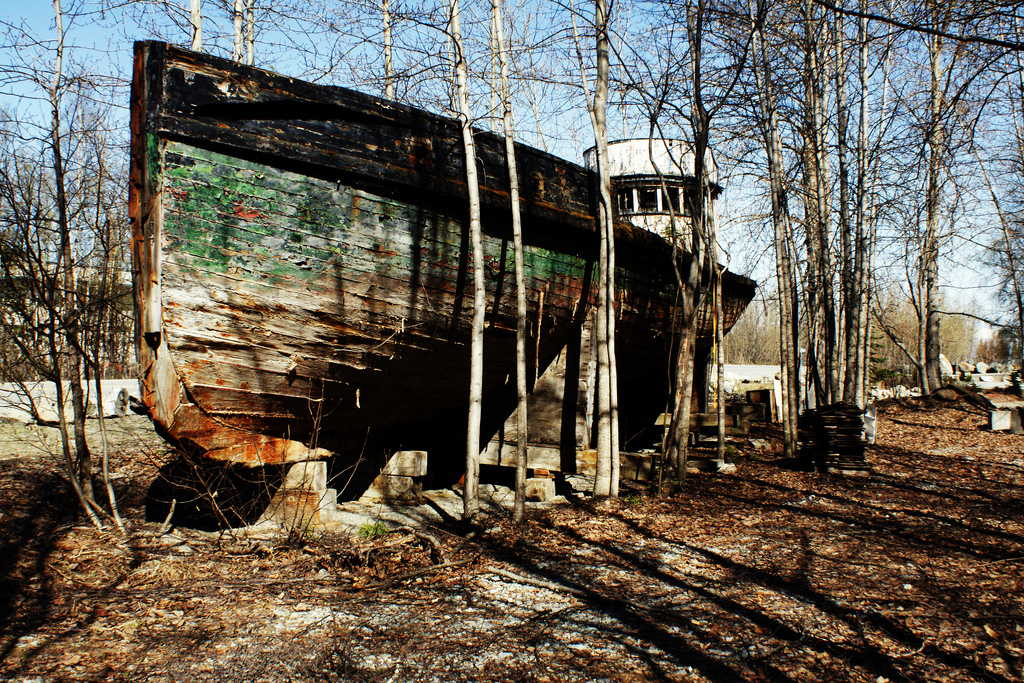
- The dry docked Chacon in Chugiak, Alaska

History

United States
- Name: Chacon, F/V Chacon
- Namesake: Cape Chacon Alaska
- Ordered: 1910-1912
- Builder: Johnson Brothers and Blanchard Seattle, Washington
- Launched: 1912
- Completed: 1912
- Acquired: 1984 (salvage)
- Out of service: 1978
- Home port: Ketchikan, Alaska
- Identification: 209595 / WA9208
- Fate: Demolished in 2022
- Notes: Memorial site

General characteristics
- Type: Tender
- Tonnage: 58 GRT
- Displacement: 100 long tons (102 t)
- Length: 72 ft (22 m)
- Beam: 17 ft (5.2 m)
- Depth of hold: 7.5 ft
- Propulsion: Single screw propeller
- Complement: 3

Chacon was a 72 ft (22 m) dry docked wooden vessel and roadside curiosity in Chugiak, Alaska, United States. The former cannery tender occupied a parcel at 17049 Old Glenn Highway until March 11, 2022, and served as a memorial to her former owner, Thillman Wallace of Chugiak (1932–2015).

== Operational history ==
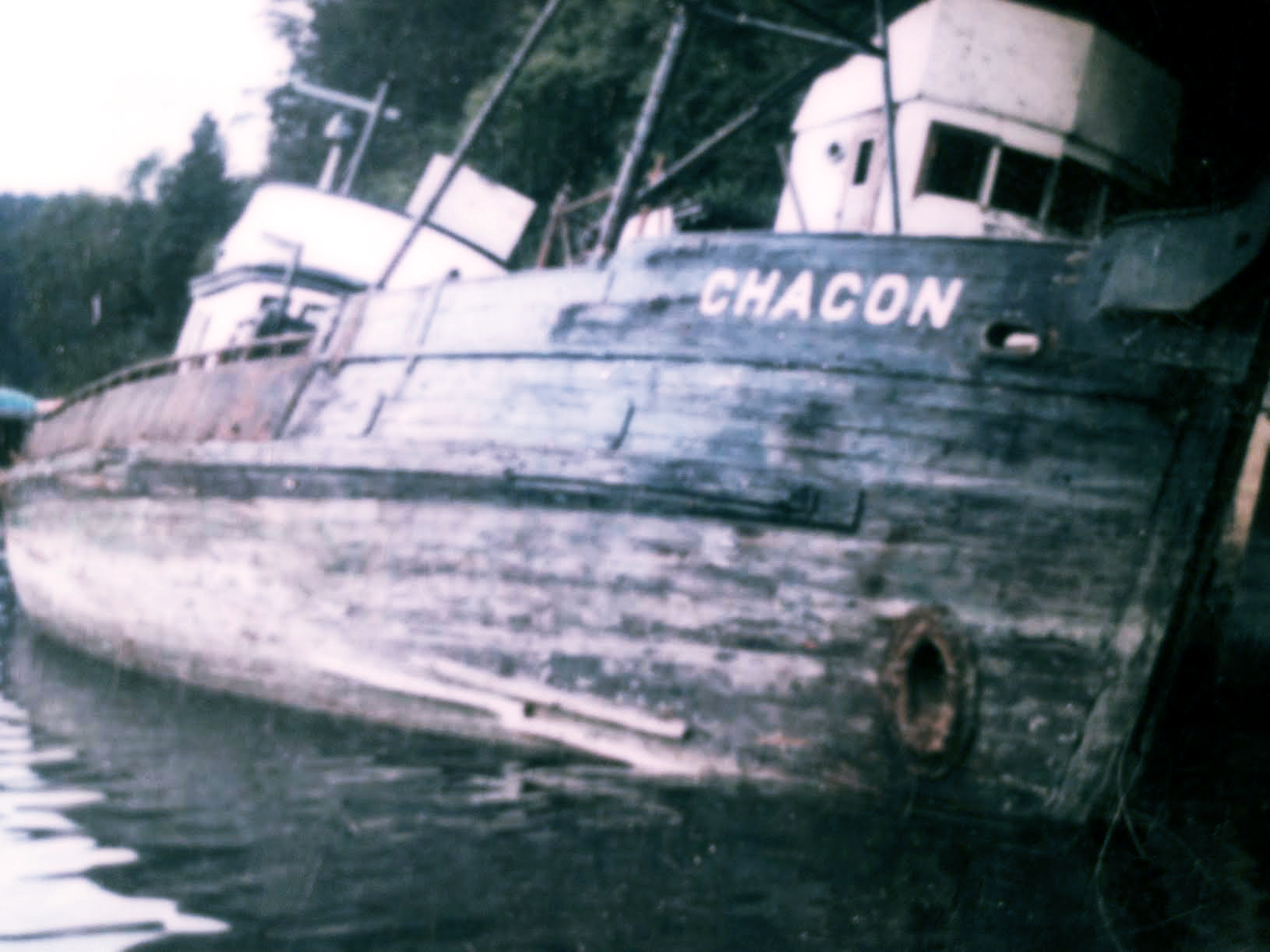
Chacon resting on beach before salvage. Another unknown boat behind her.

Chacon and her sister Celtic were designed by world-famous naval architect Leslie Geary and built in Seattle by Johnson Brothers and Blanchard in 1912 as fish trap tenders for Fidalgo Island Packing Co. cannery operations in Ketchikan, Alaska, and Port Graham, Alaska.

Chacon was featured in the Port Graham Independence Day Parade in Seldovia, 1930.

In March 1964, Chacon assisted with the evacuation of Old Harbor Village on Kodiak Island after it was leveled by 50 ft (15 m) tsunami waves. Chacon with 43 persons on board, radioed the US Coast Guard to request the evacuation of a woman having a miscarriage. Chacon requested meeting with Coast Guard plane at Ugak Bay. USCG instructed Chacon to proceed to Kodiak at "best speed".

During her period owned by the Tillions; Chacon reportedly struck a boom cable in Icy Bay, causing damage to the bow, and was subsequently beached alongside another wreck in Kachemak Bay. Chacon was originally powered with a 125 hp gasoline engine that was later replaced with a General Motors "Jimmy" Detroit Diesel Series 71.

== Recovery and salvage ==
In 1984, Thillman Wallace spotted the half-sunken ship while on a fishing trip near Homer, Alaska, and became fascinated by it. The next day Wallace purchased the Chacon for $5,000 from William "Willie" Tillion, whose family has fished out of nearby Halibut Cove for decades, with the intent of restoring her to sail around the world. The vessel was refloated with crude patches and several bilge pumps in August 1984 and towed to Anchorage, Alaska, where she would be lifted from the water and taken to Chugiak to be restored.

To haul the vessel onto land for transport, Wallace paid for the removal of debris that had illegally been dumped on the shore as well as sand and gravel to facilitate the lifting operation.

The ship was transported by truck to its current site in Peters Creek using a trailer designed for moving buildings, but the additional weight required frequent tire replacement and supplemental braking by dump trucks from Wallace's concrete business. When she arrived in Peters Creek she was put on blocks at the edge of Wallace's property along the Old Glenn Highway. Although Wallace has died, she still rests in her spot.

== Current status ==
Chacon was demolished on March 11, 2022. The vessel suffered significant deterioration from exposure and abundant moss and plant growth. Structural failure to the stern section was highly visible during the final years. Over the years at the roadside site, all of her windows have been smashed and all of her valuable things have been stolen, including her brass propeller.

== Gallery ==
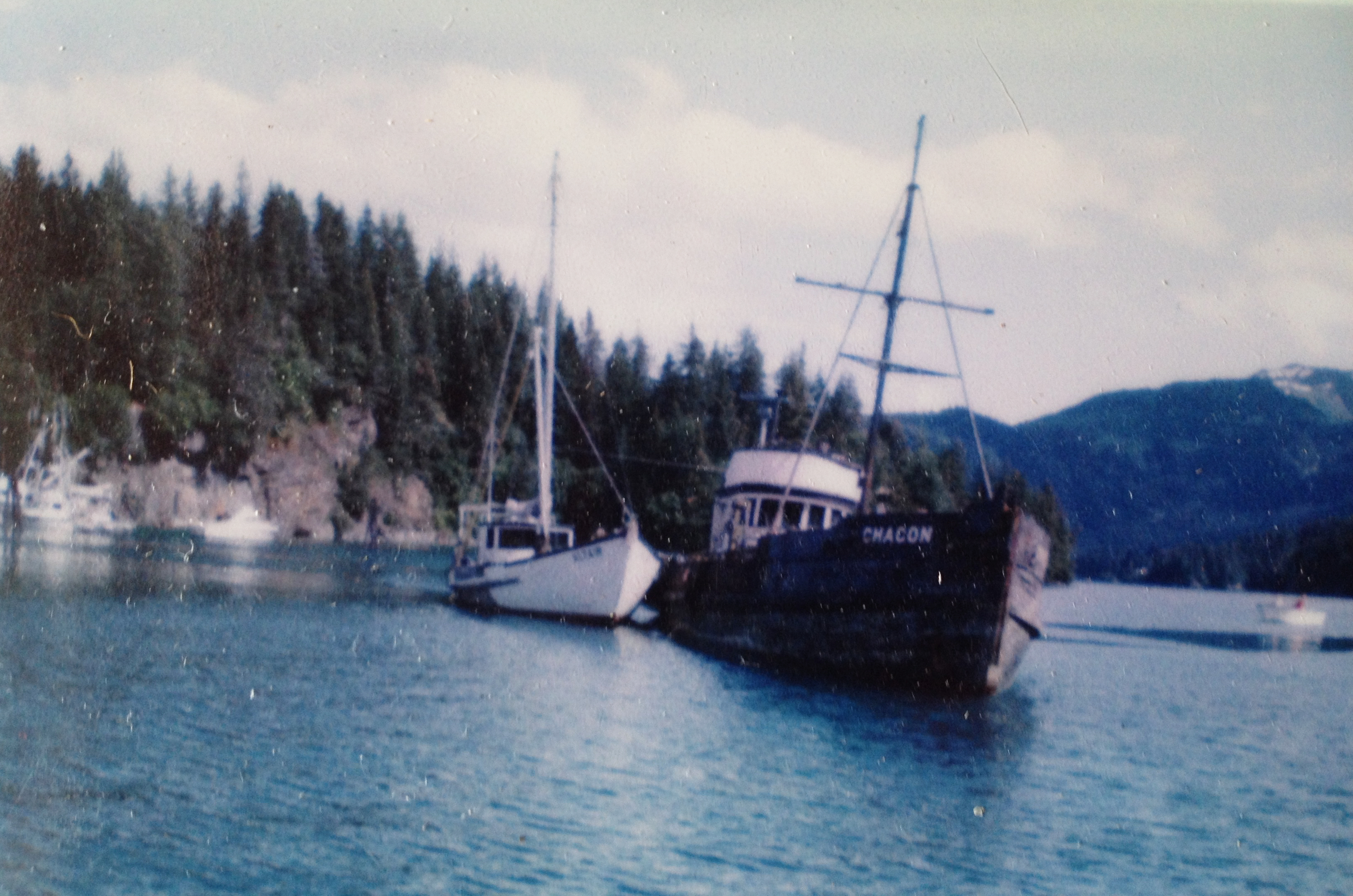
Chacon after being re floated, somewhere in Kachemak Bay.

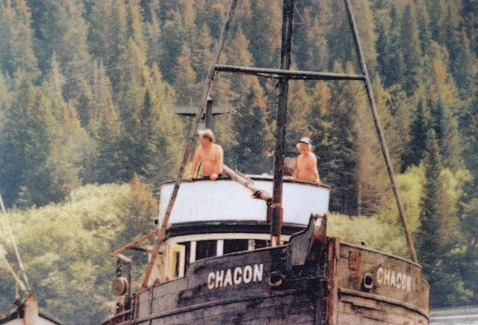
Thillman and Art Wallace aboard the Chacon being towed to Anchorage.

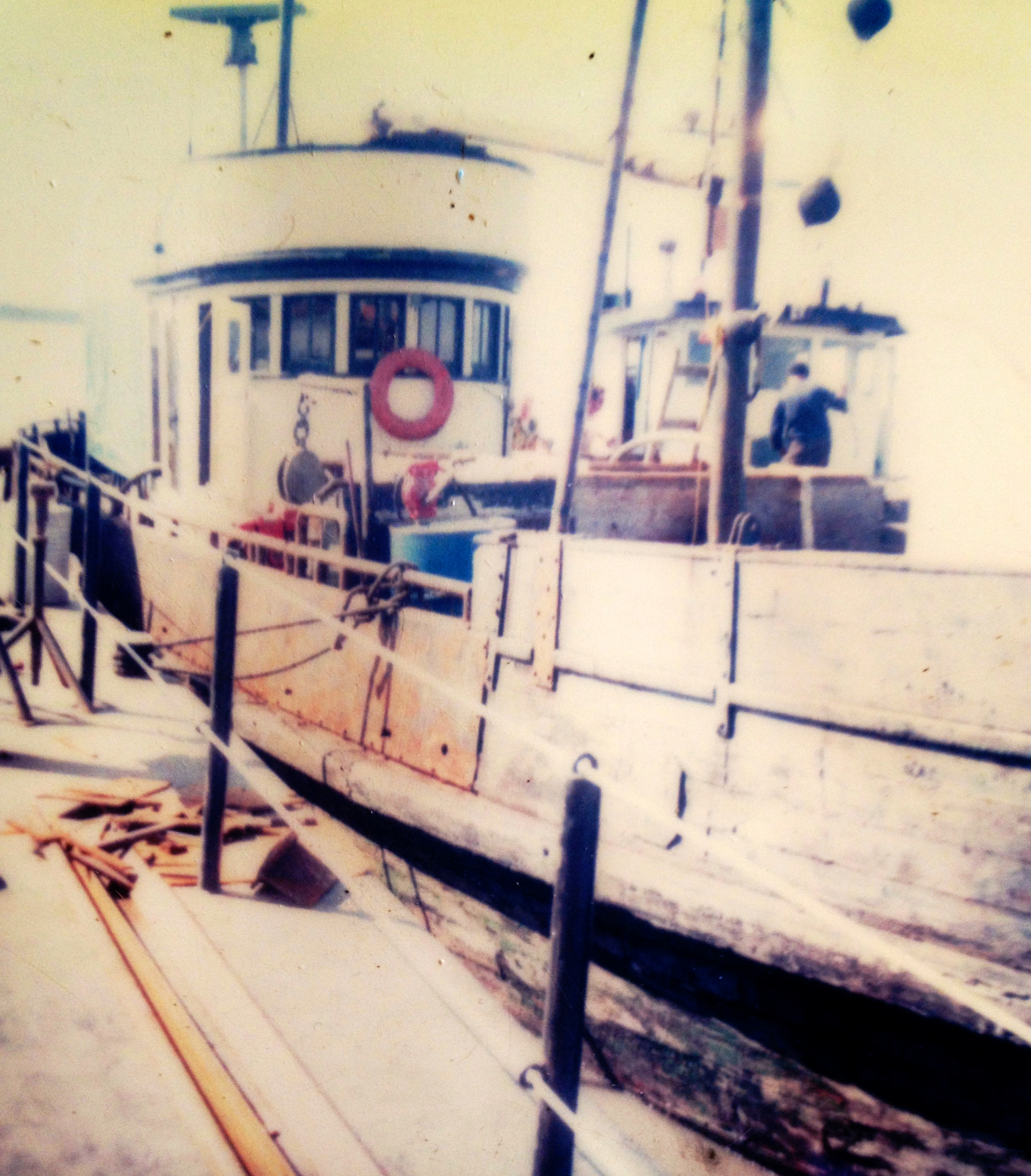
Chacon as seen from the dock at Anchorage.

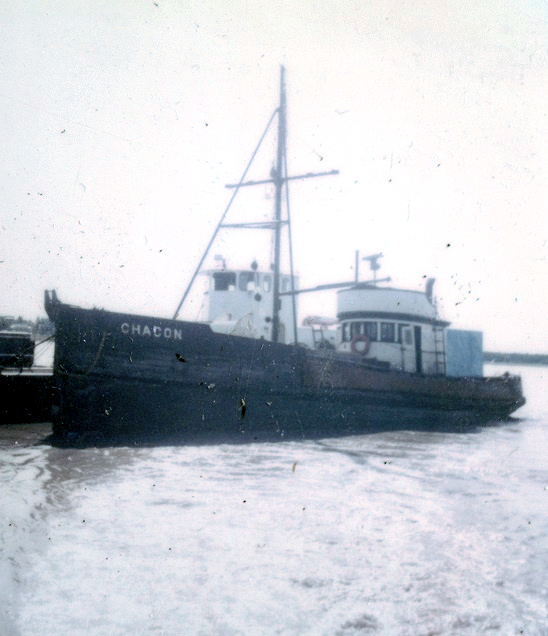
Chacon at Port of Anchorage

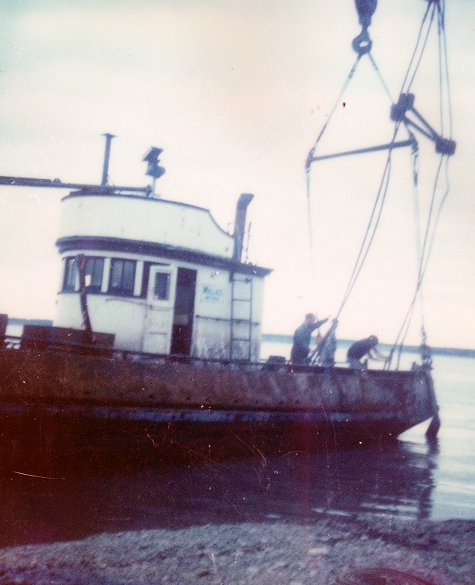
Chacon being prepared for lifting out of the water at Anchorage Alaska.

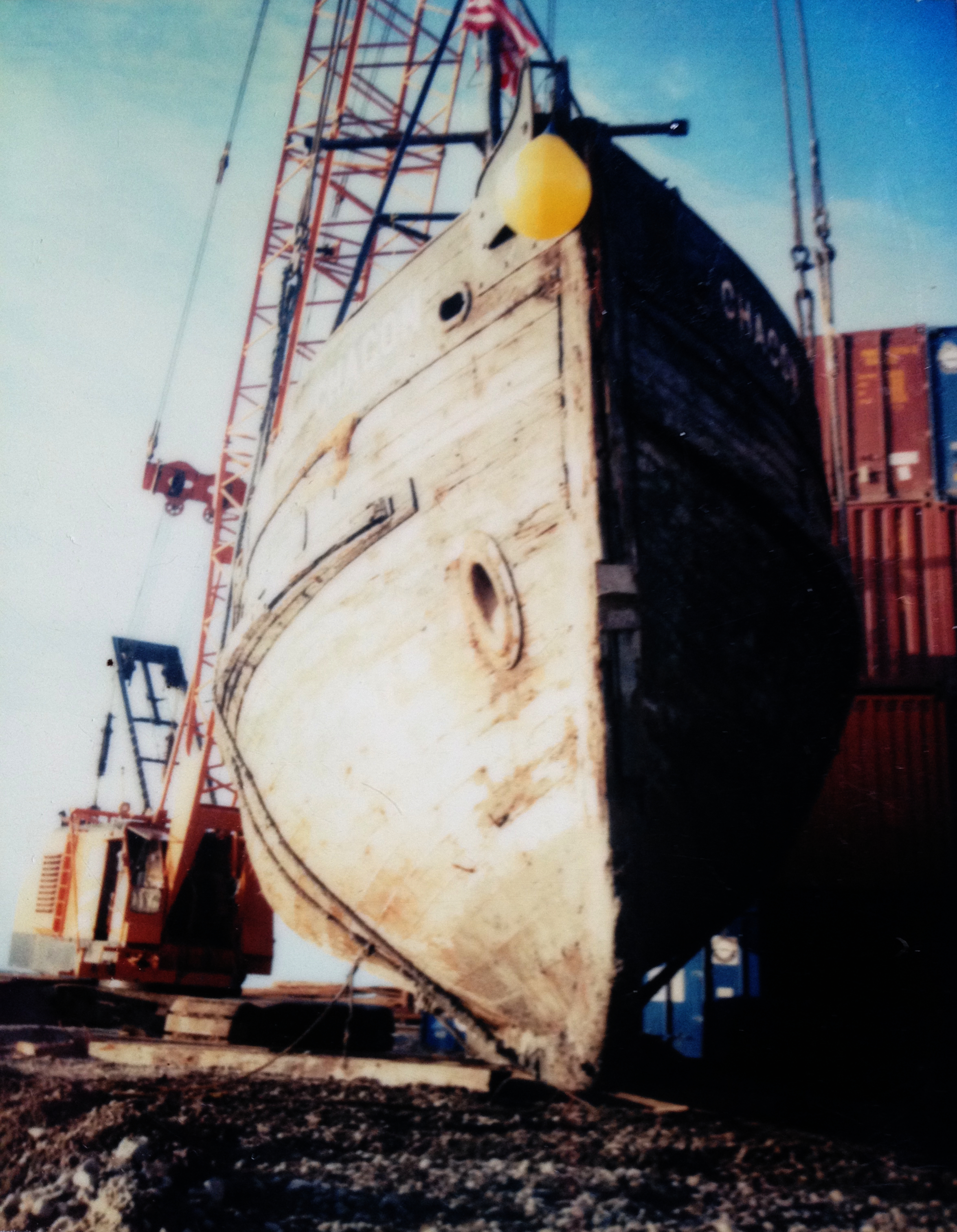
Chacon's hull after lifting for transport.

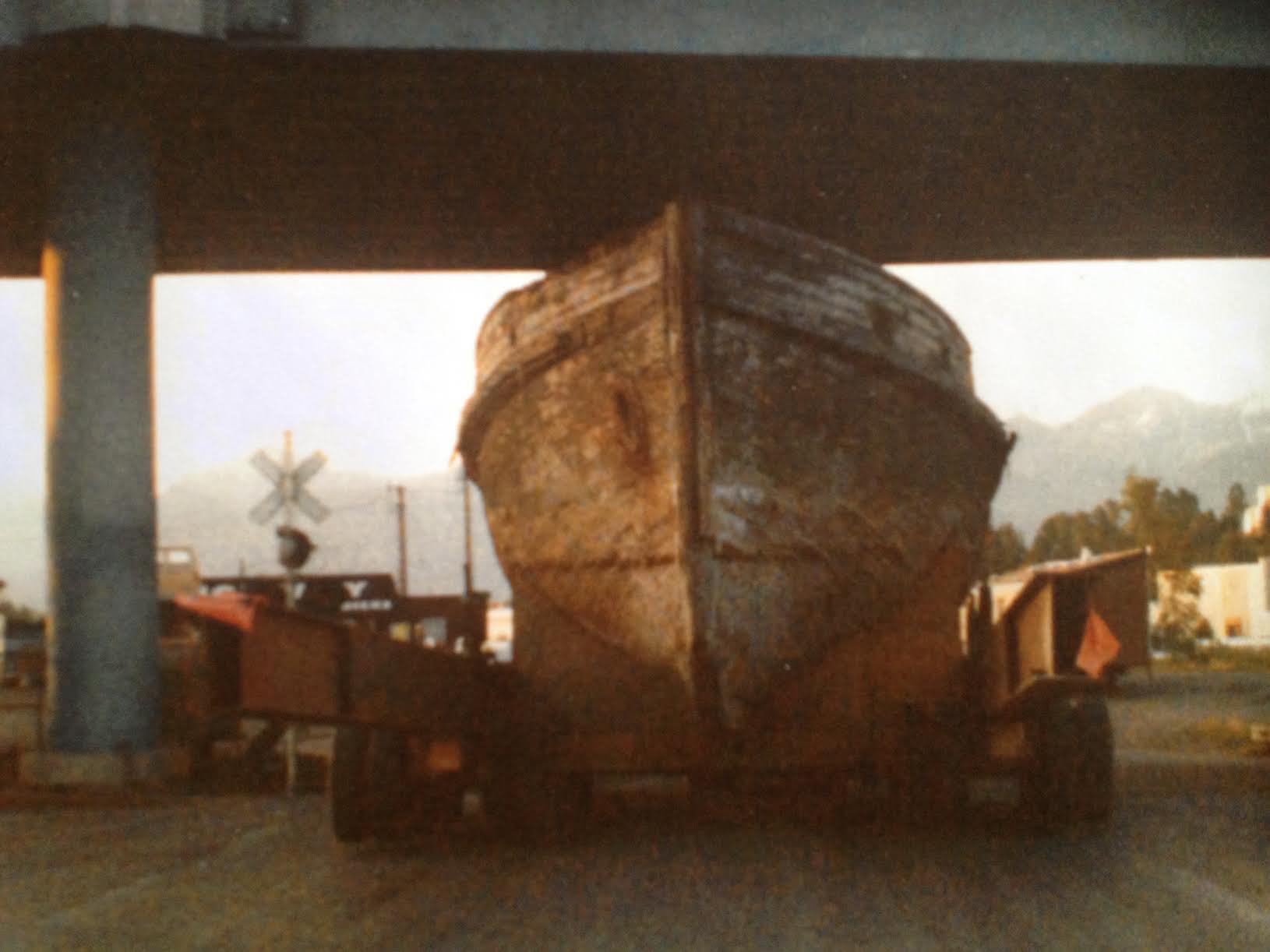
Chacon passing under the A Street bridge in Downtown Anchorage.

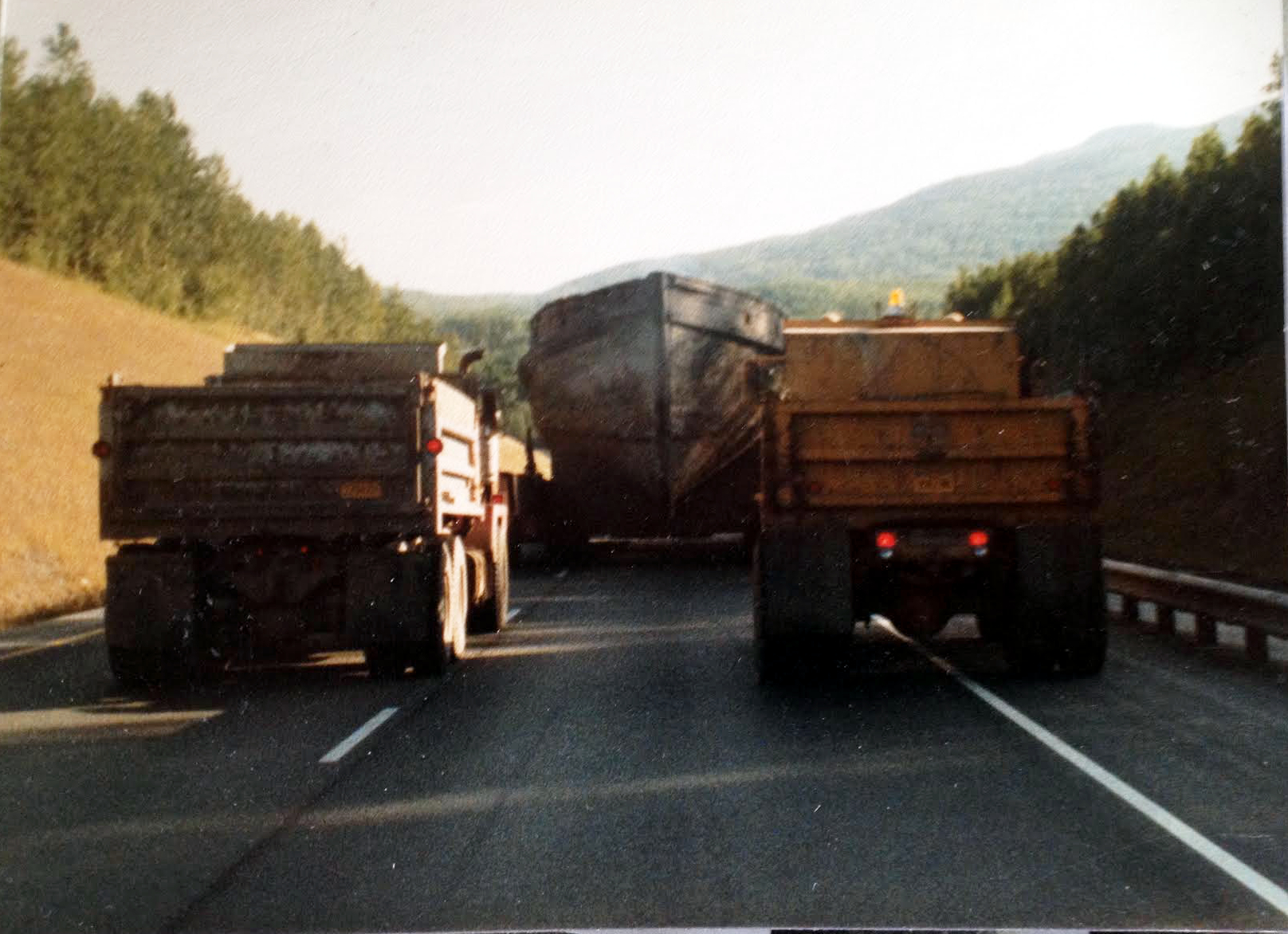
Chacon Towed Down Hill over Eagle River Bridge.

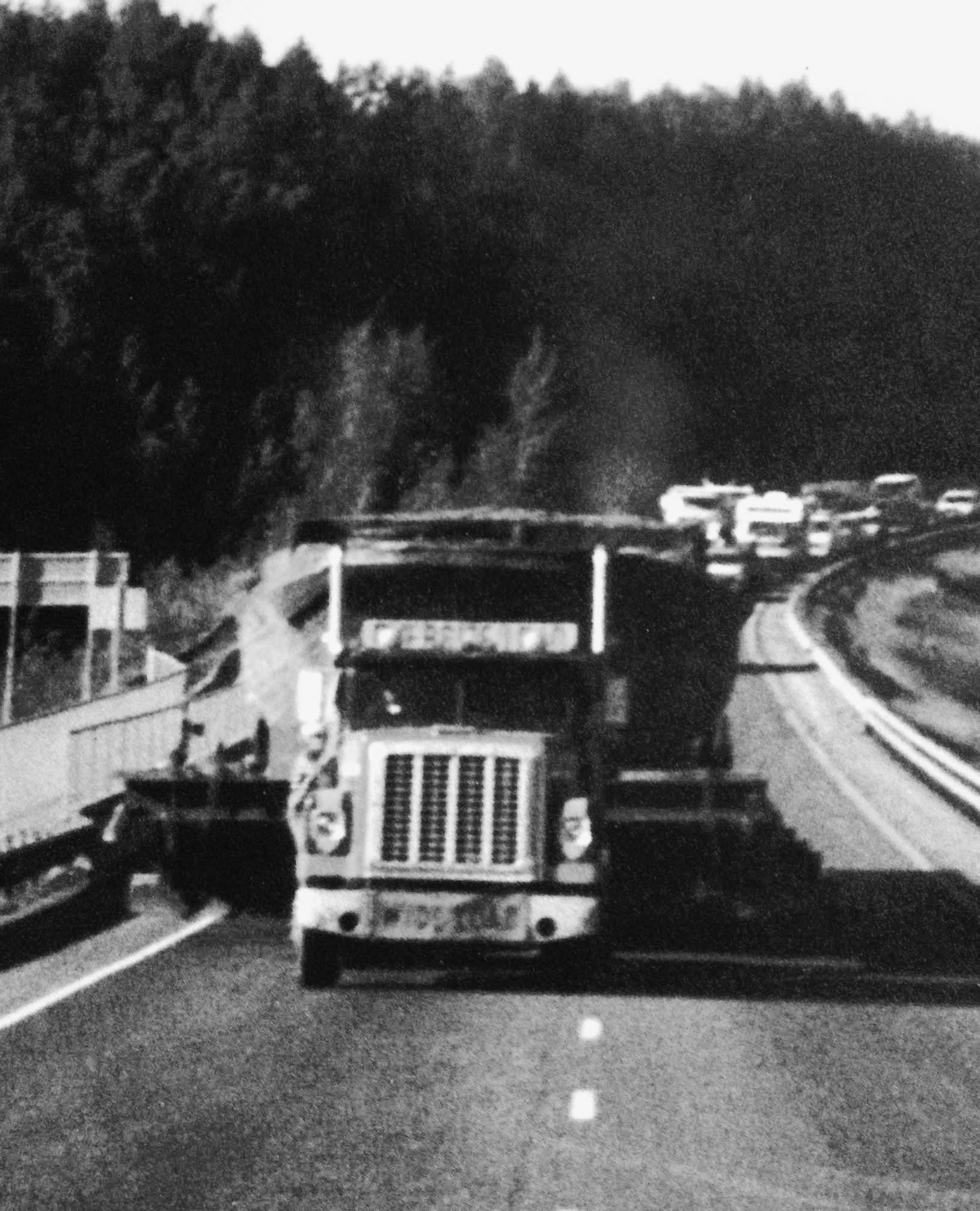
Chacon being towed on Glenn Highway near Anchorage, Alaska.
