= William Caskey Swaim =

American actor

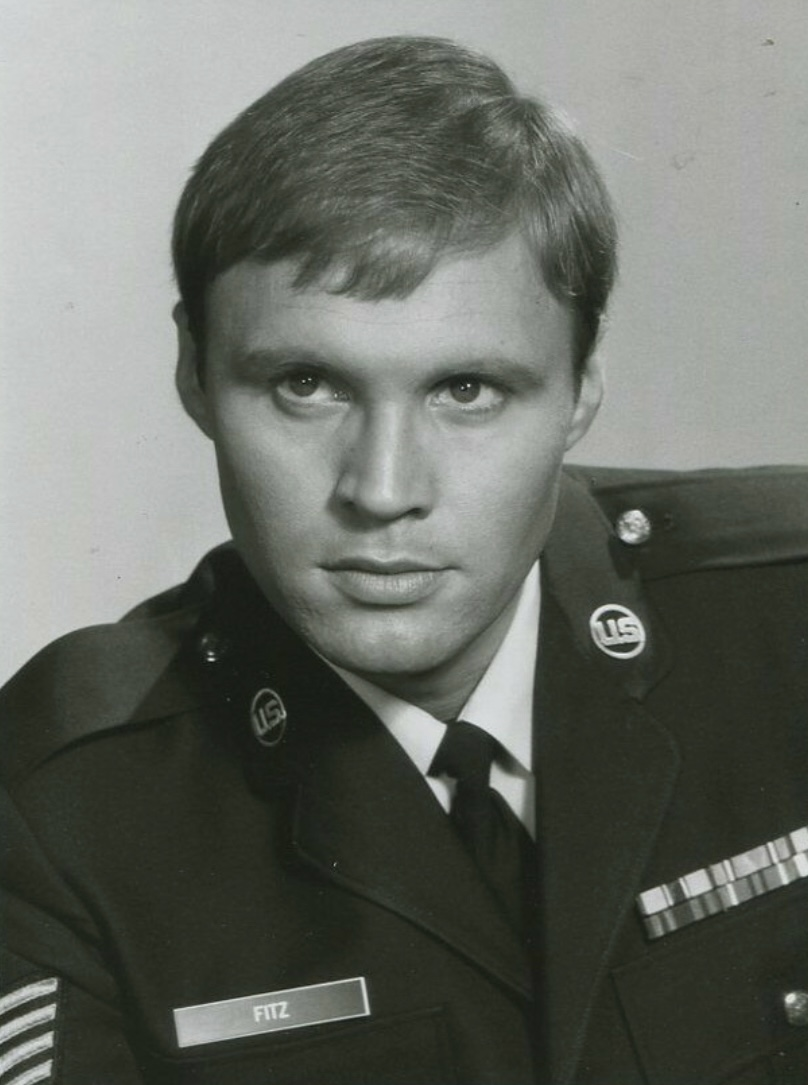
- Swaim in Project U.F.O., 1978
- Born: William Cakey Swaim; January 11, 1947 (age 79); Lexington, North Carolina, U.S.
- Occupation: Actor
- Years active: 1977–1989

William Caskey Swaim (born January 11, 1947) is an American television and film actor, best known for having played Staff Sergeant Harry Fitz in the 1978-1979 television series, Project U.F.O.

== Personal life ==
Swaim, commonly known as "Bill" as a child, was born in Lexington, North Carolina. He attended Grimes Elementary School and both Lexington Junior High School and Lexington Senior High School. He had been interested in film since childhood, remembering "his sister ... taking him to see an early Brando movie, On the Waterfront, at the age of five".

He cites Elvis Presley as a major influence on him as a child. After playing "two minor roles in a play at the Winston-Salem Little Theatre" at the age of 17, he graduated from high school in 1965. Although he then attended Gardner–Webb University for one and a half years, working on a liberal arts major, he was then drafted into the military.

After spending 18 months as a medic in Okinawa, he returned from his tour of duty in 1969. He obtained a job in Lexington and worked there for a year to save money, before getting married and moving to California in 1971.

== Career ==
Swaim and his wife rented an apartment in North Hollywood and he obtained a "night job at a convalescent hospital". While making a number of attempts to enter into the acting business, he met an actor who told him about the Actors Workshop, which was sponsored by the G.I. Bill. Swaim quickly joined, though he also obtained a "second night job as a bellman at the Continental Hyatt House" in order to pay for the rest of the expenses. He studied under Charles E. Conrad while at the Workshop and continued to apply for acting roles. Eventually, he obtained a minor role at the Theater Craft Playhouse in the play, Of Mice and Men. He met an agent while performing at the theater who set him up for his early film roles, in both Heroes and The Big Fix. Before leaving the theater for film, he starred in two other plays in 1975 though 1976, Hat Full of Rain and The Death of Bessie Smith.

After starring in Heroes, Swaim returned to theatre for a short time, before auditioning for a role as co-star in a new NBC television series produced by Jack Webb, Project U.F.O.; the series lasted only two seasons before its cancellation. The landing of the role enabled him to quit his second job and work as a full-time actor. During the same time period as the shooting of Project U.F.O., he took a day off to play a minor role in The Big Fix.

== Filmography ==
=== Film ===
- Heroes (1977) - Frank
- The Big Fix (1978) - Cop
- Night Warning (1982) - Phil Brody
- Friday the 13th: A New Beginning (1985) - Duke
- War Party (1988) - Vigilante #1
- Crystal Lake Memories: The Complete History of Friday the 13th (2013) - Himself (Documentary film)

=== Television ===
- Battle of the Network Stars V (1978) - Himself
- Project U.F.O. (1978–79) - Staff Sergeant Harry Fitz
- The Dukes of Hazzard (1979) - Ernie (one episode)
- CHiPs (1983) - Foreman (one episode)
- The A-Team (1983) - (one episode)
- Sledge Hammer! (1986) - (one episode)
- Matlock (1989) - Jimmy the Hood (two episodes)

=== Theatre ===
- Of Mice and Men (1974)
- Hat Full of Rain (1975–76)
- The Death of Bessie Smith (1975–76)
- On the Road (1977)
