= Shannon & Company =

- Type: LLC
- Industry: Motion pictures
- Founded: 1976
- Founder: R.J. Adams; Diane C. Adams
- Headquarters: Laguna Hills, California, United States
- Key people: R. J. Adams, Owner 1976 - present
- Products: Motion Pictures, Television and Documentary film

Shannon & Company, also known as Shannon & Company Productions, is an American film studio which develops, produces, and distributes films, website and television programming.

== History ==
It was founded in 1976 by director/actor R.J. Adams and wife producer Diane C. Adams as a full service advertising agency creating television, radio and print media for a number of clients throughout Los Angeles and Orange County. In the spring of 1980, the company converted to a broadcast and film production company focusing primarily on historical documentary projects and docudramas. In 1980 the company founded The Actors Workshop, Laguna Hills, Orange County, California.

== Ad agency years ==
The company served Security Pacific Bank, Ming of America, Adler shoes, Sombrero Street restaurant, Gustafson Lincoln/Mercury, System VII Insurance company and Backstage.

== Film production ==
The company has released such films as Ruins of the Reich, The Missions of California, Order Castles of the Third Reich, and The Final Journey. Other productions include Abeo Pharisee, The Studio Club, The Christmas Quilt, Chasing Jose, and Fatal Crossroads. In 2012, executive producer R.J. Adams directed the filming of Orchestra Musique Sur La Mer at the Royal College of Music for the Queen's Diamond Jubilee in London, England.

=== Shannon & Company Productions/Distribution ===
Title	Release date	Notes	Budget
Ruins of the Reich	October 26, 1992	First Documentary film produced by Shannon & Company (VHS)	$45,000
D-Day: Race to the Rhine	February 14, 1994	(co-production with History Quests VHS)	$56,000
Order Castles of the Third Reich	November 7, 1994	(in co-operation with Bundesarchiv (Deutschland) VHS	$62,000
Masters of the Reich	November 8, 1994	(English & German versions VHS)	$37,000
The Missions of California	March 18, 1998	(in co-operation of the Franciscan Friars minor)	$65,000
Ruins of the Reich	April 30, 2002	(in co-operation with the Bundesarchiv (Deutschland)four part VHS series)	$104,000
Ruins of the ReichOrder Castles of the Third Reich & The Missions of California	April 2, 2007	(added additional footage and re-mastered Special edition DVD releases	
The Final Journey	October 2, 2010	in Co-operation with the Auschwitz-Birkenau State Museum	$92,000
The Studio Club	September 20, 2012	(Pilot Net Television	$150,000
Chasing José	Summer, 2014	(Feature Film)	$165,000
Fatal Crossroads	Fall, 2015	(Feature Film)	announced

== Notes and references ==
- R.J. Adams at IMDb
- Diane C. Adams at IMDb
- Abeo Pharisee at IMDb
- The Studio Club at IMDb
- Chasing José at IMDb
- Fatal Crossroads at IMDb
