= Rob Adams (actor) =

American film actor

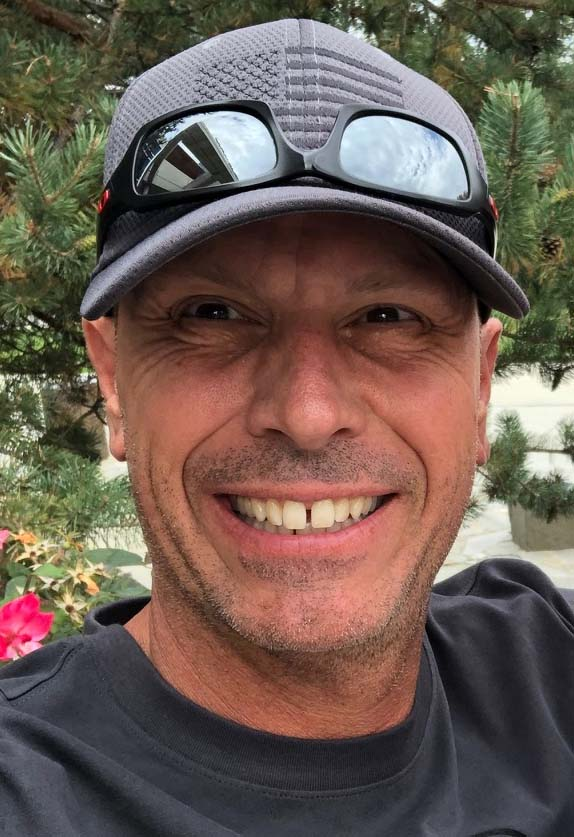
- Adams in 2021
- Occupations: Actor, acting coach, football coach
- Years active: 1990–present
- Parents: R. J. Adams; Diane C. Adams
- Website: www.theactorsworkshop.com

Rob Adams is an American actor, owner of The Actors Workshop, film acting coach, offensive coordinator at Tesoro High School and former college football quarterback.

== Early years ==
While growing up in Mission Viejo, California, Adams played Quarterback for the Jr. All- American Cowboys until he entered his freshman year at Mission Viejo High School, playing QB for the Diablos until graduating in 1988. His role as Quarterback continued with both the Saddleback Gauchos and Cal State Hayward Pioneers.

== Film/TV ==
During the past thirty years Adams has appeared in dozens of Film and Television roles including appearances on General Hospital, Days of Our Lives, Silk Stalkings, The Lone Gunman, Snowday and Forrest Gump. Currently in production, "Abeo Pharisee" and "The Studio Club" which Adams stars as CSI Investigator Brenton Troy.

== Film acting coach ==
In 1992 at the age of 22, Rob Adams started coaching acting and in 1997, became director of The Actors Workshop founded in 1978. It was under the direction of Rob that The Actors Workshop opened its North Hollywood studio in 2000. Rob has trained several successful actors which include, Rampage Jackson, Warren G, Tiffany, Sarah Lancaster, Wayne Bastrup, Annet Mahendru, David Farkas and Randy Josselyn. The Actors Workshop is currently ranked as one of the top 3 Acting School in California.

== Tesoro high school football ==
After several years away from high school coaching, in 2017 Adams joined the Tesoro football staff as a Junior Varsity coach. In 2019, Rob was promoted to Varsity Offensive Coordinator and QB Coach.

== Filmography ==
=== Film ===
Year	Title	Role	Notes
1994	Forrest Gump	College Quarterback	
2000	Snow Day	Billy	
2003	The Prince of Guilt?	Officer #2	
2007	The Wager	Reporter	
2010	The Final Journey	Major Mark Ryan	
2012	Abeo Pharisee	LAPD Sergeant	
2014	The Studio Club	Brenton Troy	
2019	6 Underground	Hansi	
2020	For the Goblins	Bar	

=== Television ===
Year	Title	Role	Notes
1990–1991	1st & Ten	Rod Stevens	4 episodes
1992	Melrose Place	Richie	Episode: "For Love or Money"
1992	Days of Our Lives	Riley	Episode: "Episode #1.6925"
1993–1994	General Hospital	Bill Danton	2 episodes
1996	Deadly Games	Trash Man	Episode: "The Trash Man"
1998	Silk Stalkings	Frat Boy	Episode: "The Party"
1999	Family Law	Bailiff	3 episodes
2001	The Associates	Keith Taylor	Episode: "Don't Ask Don't Tell"
2001	The Lone Gunman	Roger Berenson	Episode: "The Lying Game"
2002	First Monday	Jason Carnegie	Episode: "Family Secrets"
2002	That's Life	Walt Reynolds	Episode: "Gutterball"
2003	According to Jim	Thomas	Episode: "The Ring"
2004	The D.A.	Deputy D.A. Ricks	Episode: "The People vs. Patricia Henry"
2004	The Last Casino	Cheater	TV movie
2004	LAX	Officer Beckler	Episode: "The Longest Morning"
2005–2006	Close to Home	Dr. Charles Branson	4 episodes
2006	Passions	Detective Tyler Rhodes	2 episodes
2007	Prison Break	Convict	Episode: "John Doe"
2009–2010	Friday Night Lights	Coach Reeves	3 episodes
