= Florida State League Manager of the Year Award =

- Sport: Baseball
- League: Florida State League
- Awarded for: Best regular season manager in the Florida State League
- Country: United States
- Presented by: Florida State League

History
- First award: Omar Malavé (2004)
- Most wins: Omar Malavé (3)
- Most recent: Aaron Barrett (2026)

The Florida State League Manager of the Year Award is an annual award given to the best manager in minor league baseball's Florida State League. In 2004, Omar Malavé won the first ever Florida State League Manager of the Year Award. Malavé is also the only manager to have won the award multiple times (2004, 2008, and 2014).

Five managers from the Dunedin Blue Jays have been selected for the Manager of the Year Award, more than any other teams in the league, followed by the Fort Myers Mighty Mussels (4); the Clearwater Threshers, Lakeland Flying Tigers, Palm Beach Cardinals, St. Lucie Mets, and Tampa Yankees (2); the Bradenton Marauders, Brevard County Manatees, and Charlotte Stone Crabs (1).

Five managers from the Toronto Blue Jays Major League Baseball (MLB) organization have won the Manager of the Year Award, more than any other, followed by the Detroit Tigers and Minnesota Twins organizations (3); the New York Mets, New York Yankees, Philadelphia Phillies, and St. Louis Cardinals organizations (2); and the Milwaukee Brewers, Pittsburgh Pirates, and Tampa Bay Rays organizations (1).

== Key ==
(#)	Number of wins by managers who have won the award multiple times
*	Indicates league champions

== Winners ==
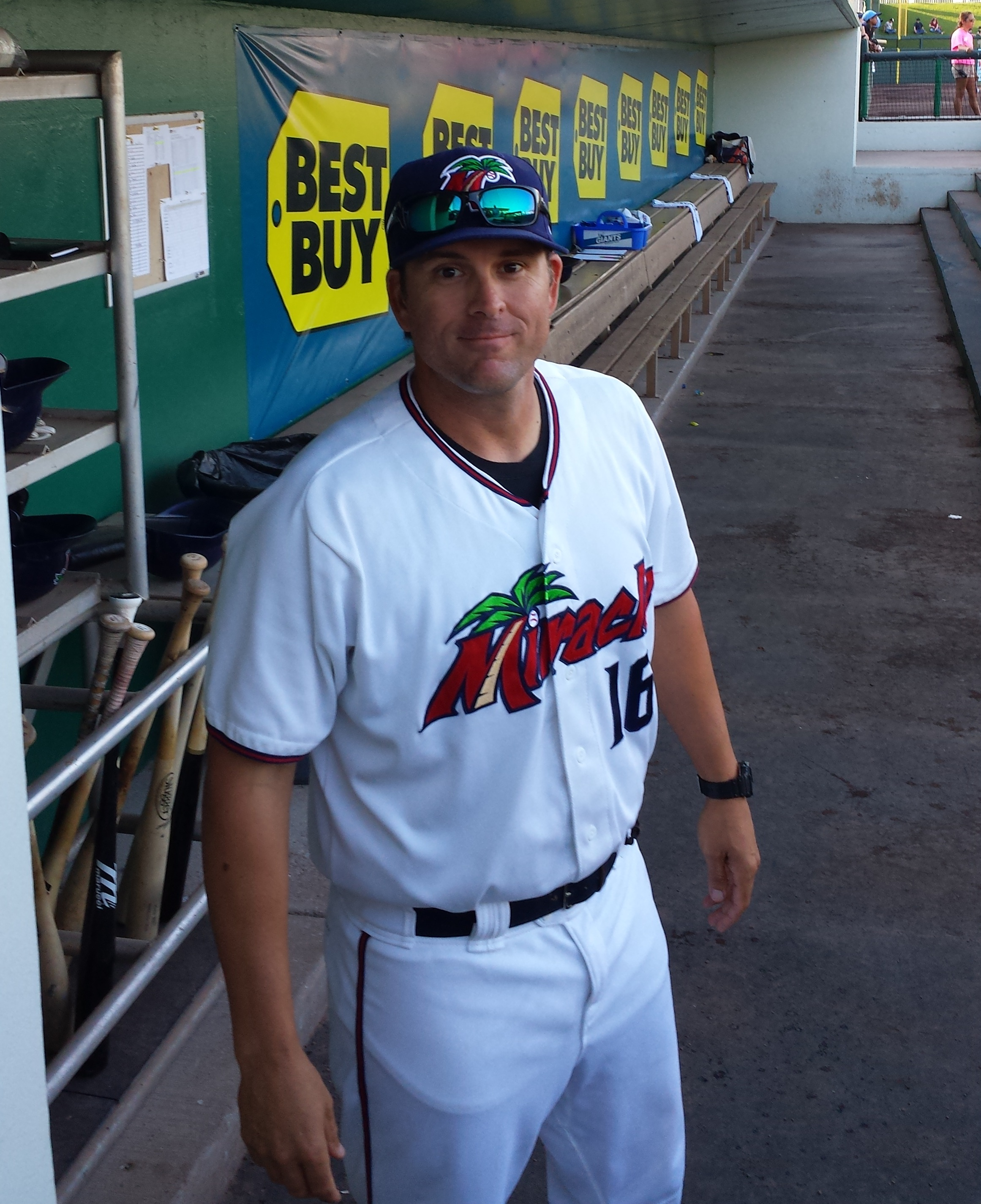
Doug Mientkiewicz, 2013 Florida State League Manager of the Year

Year	Winner	Team	Organization	Division	Finish^{[a]}	Record^{[b]}	Ref(s).
2004	Omar Malavé (1)	Dunedin Blue Jays	Toronto Blue Jays	West	1st	76–57	
2005	Mike Rojas	Lakeland Tigers	Detroit Tigers	West	1st	85–48	
2006	Gary Carter	St. Lucie Mets^{*}	New York Mets	East	1st	77–62	
2007	John Tamargo	Brevard County Manatees	Milwaukee Brewers	East	1st	74–62	
2008	Omar Malavé (2)	Dunedin Blue Jays	Toronto Blue Jays	West	1st	85–53	
2009	Jeff Smith	Fort Myers Miracle	Minnesota Twins	South	1st	80–58	
2010	Jim Morrison	Charlotte Stone Crabs	Tampa Bay Rays	South	1st	80–59	
2011	Clayton McCullough	Dunedin Blue Jays	Toronto Blue Jays	North	1st	79–61	
2012	Ryan Ellis	St. Lucie Mets	New York Mets	South	1st	83–52	
2013	Doug Mientkiewicz	Fort Myers Miracle	Minnesota Twins	South	1st	79–56	
2014	Omar Malavé (3)	Dunedin Blue Jays	Toronto Blue Jays	North	1st	77–61	
2015	Greg Legg	Clearwater Threshers	Philadelphia Phillies	North	1st	79–58	
2016	Pat Osborn	Tampa Yankees	New York Yankees	North	2nd	77–58	
2017	Jay Bell	Tampa Yankees	New York Yankees	North	1st	85–50	
2018	Dann Bilardello	Palm Beach Cardinals	St. Louis Cardinals	South	1st	75–58	
2019	Cesar Martin	Dunedin Blue Jays	Toronto Blue Jays	North	1st	80–55	
2020	None selected (season cancelled due to COVID-19 pandemic)						
2021	Jonathan Johnston	Bradenton Marauders^{*}	Pittsburgh Pirates	West	2nd	71–48	
2022	Brian Meyer	Fort Myers Mighty Mussels	Minnesota Twins	West	1st	69–59	
2023	Andrew Graham	Lakeland Flying Tigers	Detroit Tigers	West	3rd	70–61	
2024	Gary Kendall	Palm Beach Cardinals^{*}	St. Louis Cardinals	East	1st	83–47	
2025	René Rivera	Lakeland Flying Tigers^{*}	Detroit Tigers	West	1st	75–53	
2026	Aaron Barrett	Clearwater Threshers	Philadelphia Phillies	West	2nd	74–55	

== Notes ==
- ^{a} The Finish column indicates final position in the divisional standings.
- ^{b} The Record column indicates wins and losses during the regular season and excludes any post-season play.
