= Project U.F.O. =

American science-fiction television drama (1978–1979)

- Opening title card, photographed from black-and-white television screen. The show was filmed and broadcast in color.
- Genre: Anthology; Mystery
- Created by: Jack Webb; Harold Jack Bloom
- Directed by: Donald L. Gold; Robert Blees
- Starring: William Jordan; Caskey Swaim; Edward Winter
- Narrated by: Jack Webb
- Composer: Nelson Riddle
- Country of origin: United States
- Original language: English
- No. of seasons: 2
- No. of episodes: 26

Production
- Executive producers: Gene Levitt; Jack Webb
- Producers: Robert Blees; William Coleman
- Editor: Chuck McClelland
- Running time: 60 minutes
- Production companies: Mark VII Limited; Worldvision Enterprises

Original release
- Network: NBC
- Release: February 19, 1978 – July 19, 1979

Project U.F.O. is an American television series which ran on NBC from 1978 to 1979. It was also known as, and remembered by many, as Project Blue Book. Running for two seasons of 13 episodes each, the show was based loosely on the real-life Project Blue Book. The show was created by Jack Webb, who pored through Air Force files looking for episode ideas.

The show was a production of Mark VII Limited in association with Worldvision Enterprises, now CBS Television Distribution and was Webb's last weekly series produced before his death. It was also one of the rare times that Webb did not produce a series with Universal Television or Warner Bros. Television; Webb collaborated with Universal for every series he made following his departure from Warner Bros., who had named him the president of its television division in the 1960s.

== Synopsis ==
The show features two U.S. Air Force investigators with the Foreign Technology Division at Wright-Patterson Air Force Base, charged with investigating UFO sightings. The first season starred William Jordan as Maj. Jake Gatlin alongside Caskey Swaim as Staff Sgt. Harry Fitz. Swaim, who had never had any significant acting experience before landing the role, added diversity as a Southerner with a pronounced accent. In season two, Jordan was replaced by Edward Winter as Capt. Ben Ryan.

In the pilot episode, Gatlin informed the newly assigned Fitz that, since it is impossible to prove a negative, their job was to prove that each UFO sighting was real, by researching and disproving possible alternate explanations. Gatlin also told Fitz that he himself had once seen "something I can't explain" while flying as an Air Force pilot, which led to his interest in Blue Book.

== Opening credits ==
The season one opening montage showed flying saucer diagrams and schematics, while a minor-key version of "Ezekiel Saw the Wheel" played. A voice-over (narrated by Webb) then spoke:

"Ezekiel saw the wheel. This [UFO diagrams] is the wheel he said he saw. These are Unidentified Flying Objects that people say they are seeing now. Are they proof that we are being visited by civilizations from other stars? Or just what are they? The United States Air Force began an investigation of this high strangeness in a search for the truth. What you are about to see is part of that 20-year search."

The opening narration erroneously cites Project Blue Book as lasting 20 years, rather than only 17 as was the actual case (1952-1969). Notable was the extensive use of miniatures for the UFOs by Brick Price Movie Miniatures (now Wonderworks), usually cobbled together from off-the-shelf model kits.

== Broadcast history ==
Viewership and ratings per season of Project U.F.O.
Season	Timeslot ()	Episodes	First aired	Last aired	Ref.
1	Sunday at 7:00–8:00 PM (Episode 1); Sunday at 8:00–9:00 PM (Episodes 2–13)	13	February 19, 1978	June 4, 1978	N/A
2	Thursday at 8:00–9:00 PM	13	September 21, 1978	July 19, 1979	N/A

== Episodes ==
=== Season 1: 1978 ===
No. overall	No. in season	Title	Directed by	Written by	Original release date
1	1	"Sighting 4001: The Washington D.C. Incident"	Richard Quine	Harold Jack Bloom	February 19, 1978
A woman on a Virginia farm reports a strange object in her yard and a robot-like creature that communicates with her. Also, a U.S. Air Force pilot chases a UFO and dies. Based loosely on both the 1952 Washington D.C. UFO incident and the Mantell UFO incident.
2	2	"Sighting 4002: The Joshua Flats Incident"	Robert M. Leeds	Harold Jack Bloom	February 26, 1978
Prominent citizens of a town report seeing a UFO. Investigators, however, cannot get information from them and turn to an 11-year-old boy.
3	3	"Sighting 4003: The Fremont Incident"	Sigmund Neufeld Jr.	Lester William Berke, Donald L. Gold	March 12, 1978
A police officer is ridiculed after claiming to see a strange alien craft and two astronaut-type figures. Based on the real-life Lonnie Zamora incident. Gatlin and Fitz investigate sightings by Robert Lee Armstrong and Henry Marsden. Marsden reports that the air force tried to shoot down a UFO and he has evidence that fell through the roof of his barn.
4	4	"Sighting 4004: The Howard Crossing Incident"	Robert M. Leeds	Lester William Berke, Donald L. Gold	March 19, 1978
Frederick Carlson witnesses a glowing white ball crash on his ranch. Shortly after he and the rest of his family are brutally attacked by aliens that came from within the ball which turns out to be their space craft. Carlson and his oldest boy try to fight off the creatures only to find out that their weapons don't work against them. Based loosely on the real-life Kelly–Hopkinsville encounter.
5	5	"Sighting 4005: The Medicine Bow Incident"	Dennis Donnelly	Sean Baine	March 26, 1978
A boomerang-shaped craft chases Mid-America Flight 54 piloted by Captain Ed Mason and co-pilot Brad Everett. Based loosely on the real-life Chiles-Whitted UFO encounter. Meanwhile, in Medicine Bow, Wyoming, Gus Shaftner lets it be known that he thinks the U.S. Air Force is covering up his story about being attacked by aliens after being taken aboard a UFO.
6	6	"Sighting 4006: The Nevada Desert Incident"	Robert M. Leeds	Robert Blees	April 2, 1978
A U.S. Air Force lieutenant risks his career and marriage after he reports seeing four metallic objects and a mother ship.
7	7	"Sighting 4007: The Forest City Incident"	Dennis Donnelly	Donald L. Gold	April 9, 1978
A Duck hunter called Stu Hadley claims that he has a photograph of a flying saucer on his latest hunting trip. High school students Jerry Daniels and Clay Munson claimed to have seen a UFO while parked in the woods with their girlfriends.
8	8	"Sighting 4008: The Desert Springs Incident"	Robert M. Leeds	Donald L. Gold	April 23, 1978
An enormous UFO pursues an agent and a writer as they ride to a California resort in Desert Springs. Also, an old woman claims she was visited by aliens who offered to take her to the planet Venus.
9	9	"Sighting 4009: The French Incident"	Sigmund Neufeld Jr.	Donald L. Gold	April 30, 1978
After the son of a Presidential Envoy is kidnapped by a UFO in France, Gatlin and Fitz are sent by the White House to investigate.
10	10	"Sighting 4010: The Waterford Incident"	Dennis Donnelly	Michael Donovan	May 7, 1978
Boys at a military school become involved with a strange substance from a UFO and a hunter is attacked by a robot. Joyce Brothers stars as Dr. Paulson. Based very loosely on the Cisco Grove UFO Encounter as reported in 1964. Note: The robot is a version of the Robby the Robot suit featuring a shorter head with a giant green eye.
11	11	"Sighting 4011: The Doll House Incident"	Robert M. Leeds	Robert Blees	May 20, 1978
Strange alien beings offer a strange loaf of bread to Carl Youngstrom in exchange for a jug of water. The aliens want him to eat the lotus-shaped bread but he manages to save some as evidence. Loosely based on Joe Simonton and the Eagle River encounter.
12	12	"Sighting 4012: The Rock and Hard Place Incident"	Dennis Donnelly	Michael Donovan	May 27, 1978
Gatlin and Fitz find themselves under investigation after they witness a flying saucer leaving a trail of exploding colors over a restaurant.
13	13	"Sighting 4013: The St. Hillary Incident"	Robert M. Leeds	James E. Moser	June 4, 1978
Two nuns in New Mexico, Sister Lucy Ryker and Sister Anne, report seeing a UFO and a cryptic message about its return. The Archbishop pressures them to change their story.

=== Season 2: 1978–79 ===
No. overall	No. in season	Title	Directed by	Written by	Original release date
14	1	"Sighting 4015: The Underwater Incident"	John Patterson	Robert Blees, Alf Harris, Margaret Armen, Steve Downing	September 21, 1978
New partners Captain Ben Ryan and Harry Fitz investigate the report of a UFO ramming a charter boat. During their investigation they must try to rescue marine biologist Eve Summers who becomes trapped underwater.
15	2	"Sighting 4017: The Devilish Davidson Lights Incident"	John Patterson	Robert Blees	September 28, 1978
After three college professors report a pair of V-shaped UFOs, the crafts are witnessed again. Based on the Lubbock Lights incident.
16	3	"Sighting 4016: The Pipeline Incident"	Robert M. Leeds	Andrew Burke	October 5, 1978
A cargo plane navigator mysteriously changes his reported UFO story about an encounter in the Yukon. Guest star Randolph Mantooth.
17	4	"Sighting 4018: The Incident on the Cliffs"	Robert M. Leeds	Greg Heffernan	October 12, 1978
On the Atlantic coast of Maine, a woman with an emotionally fraught past, manages to film four blue and white UFOs as hard evidence for Project Blue Book. Later, the woman’s daughter witnesses another sequence of UFOs which, it is later revealed, rang serious alarm bells all the way to the Pentagon itself. Guest starring: Trish Stewart.
18	5	"Sighting 4019: The Believe It or Not Incident"	John Patterson	George F. Slavin, Donald L. Gold	October 19, 1978
A student says aliens have warned him via lasers and music that the Earth will be taken over unless pollution is cleaned up.
19	6	"Sighting 4022: The Camouflage Incident"	Robert M. Leeds	Robert C. Dennis	November 2, 1978
Three Californian friends, all respected professional men, who are returning from a fishing trip, have an encounter with a lazily spinning UFO which disconcertingly affects their RV for no apparent reason. Film shot by one of the men, appears to reveal part of the UFO breaking off and falling to Earth. Later, a Citrus farmer stuns Ryan and Fitz with the information that he managed to recover the very same extra-terrestrial segment - and still has it! But the surprising analysis of the mysterious recovered object hints that the UFO’s real purpose may have been a fascination with developments that originate from an all too familiar entity.
20	7	"Sighting 4020: The Island Incident"	Robert M. Leeds	Ben Masselink, Andrew Burke, Donald L. Gold	November 30, 1978
On an idyllic, but very remote, island in the Western Pacific, an eminent American physician, together with three islanders, observes a limpet UFO dramatically detach from a larger mothercraft. But, when interviewed by Ryan and Fitz, the three locals flatly deny that they witnessed anything unusual.
21	8	"Sighting 4021: The Superstition Mountain Incident"	Lawrence Dobkin	George F. Slavin, Larry Alexander	December 7, 1978
Amidst the anticipation of an imminent Solar eclipse, a High School student, and his girlfriend, observe a cylindrical UFO that appears to land inside a disused local South Dakota mine. Subsequently, they discover two geometric metal ingots. Air Force analysis of one of these objects reveals it to be composed of almost impossibly pure magnesium. After Ryan and Fitz ultimately wind-up their investigation, it is revealed that the magnesium ingots may be just the most recent instance of such Extra-terrestrial offerings. Joyce Brothers appears as a materials analyst hired by a TV tabloid journalist.
22	9	"Sighting 4023: The I-Man Incident"	Richard Moder	Buck Houghton	December 28, 1978
During a stormy night along the California coast, an Air Force Interceptor aircraft is launched to identify an unknown radar contact. But, as he nears the airborne object, all contact with the pilot of the Interceptor is lost. Further down the coast, an impressionable girl encounters a UFO which emits a signal that she then mimics as a musical phrase. While investigating, Ryan learns that the signal’s pattern matches one transmitted years earlier as part of a search for extra-terrestrial intelligence.
23	10	"Sighting 4024: The Scoutmaster Incident"	Robert M. Leeds	Robert M. Leeds, George F. Slavin, Albert Aley	January 4, 1979
A Marine Corps veteran, now a High School teacher in Mississippi, witnesses a UFO during an overnight Scouting trip. Later, he has second thoughts about any publicity arising from the incident – just as a reluctant second witness admits that they observed the very same sequence of events. Aspects of this episode are loosely based on the Sonny DesVergers UFO case from the Florida Everglades.
24	11	"Sighting 4026: The Atlantic Queen Incident"	Robert M. Leeds	Donald L. Gold	July 5, 1979
The Executive Officer of the luxury liner, Atlantic Queen , witnesses two UFOs whilst the ship is enroute to New York City. The veteran captain of the liner, by contrast, is scathing in his scepticism regarding the supposed sightings. Another, ‘famous but faded’ witness claims to have encountered a humanoid occupant of the second UFO. While conducting their investigation, Ryan and Fitz may, themselves, be being skilfully surveilled. Aspects of this episode were inspired by the real-life 1978 UFO sightings in New Jersey.
25	12	"Sighting 4025: The Whitman Tower Incident"	Rich Greer	T. S. Cook	July 12, 1979
An L.A. Air Traffic Controller spots a UFO on his scanner. Later, residents of an apartment are startled by the appearance of a UFO outside their window.
26	13	"Sighting 4014: The Wild Blue Yonder Incident"	Rich Greer	Robert Blees	July 19, 1979
A student, who has ambitions of becoming a commercial airline pilot, is in jeopardy of expulsion from college after encountering a UFO and pursuing it through restricted Colorado airspace. Her boyfriend, however, is keeping pertinent information from her and the school's inquiry board. This episode, told as an extended flashback, relates Captain Ben Ryan’s first ever case at Project Blue Book.

== Disclaimer ==
Placed at the tail end of the ending credits of a majority of the episodes is this disclaimer, superimposed over the official seal of Department of the Air Force:

"The United States Air Force, after twenty-two years of investigations, concluded that none of the unidentified flying objects reported and evaluated posed a threat to our national security."

== Rights issues ==
Except for runs on the United Kingdom's Sci-Fi channel and the Australian cable network TV1 in the early 1990s and TVLand in the U.S. (which ran 1 episode as part of its Ultimate TV Fan hour), this series had not been aired since its original network run by August 2010. Mark VII had creative control over the series and originally held the copyright, but the rights to this series were uncertain as of August 2010. In Italy, the first season of the series was shown on syndication in different Italian districts (for example Video Firenze for Tuscany), with Tony Fusaro as the dubbing voice of the narrator in the opening credits. This series was also shown on Indian state run television network Doordarshan (DD) around 1985. this series of show was also shown by the Arabian American oil company. Also called Aramco in 1979 through 1981. This was aired on late night TV once a week on their channel 2 television channel station.
