= The Actors Workshop =

Film acting training program in California

Coordinates: 33.62355°N 117.67737°W

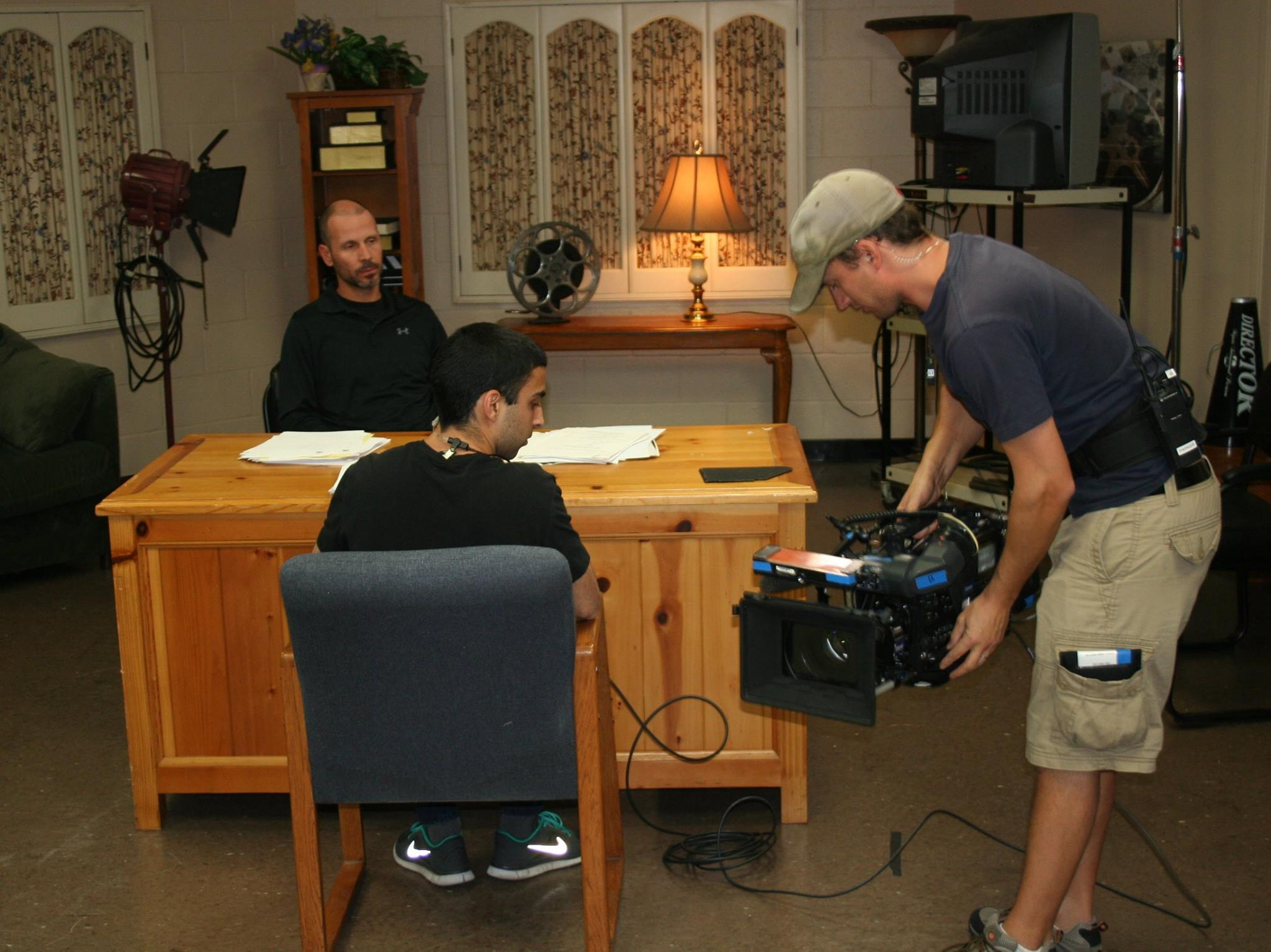
- Industry: Acting School
- Founded: 1980
- Founder: R.J. Adams
- Headquarters: North Hollywood, California; Orange County, California
- Products: Training of Film/Television Actors
- Owner: Rob Adams

The Actors Workshop is one of southern California's oldest film acting programs and is generally associated with the Sanford Meisner and Charles Conrad techniques. The company was established by its parent company, Shannon & Company.

== Overview ==
Founded by Film/TV actor R.J. Adams in 1980, The Actors Workshop has been training aspiring and professional young film/television actors in both Los Angeles and Orange County, California. Throughout the years a number of well-known industry directors and casting directors from Universal Television, Warner Brothers, Columbia Pictures, Lorimar TV, NBC, CBS and ABC have been affiliated with the workshop and continue to make bi-monthly guest appearances on a monthly basis. The school has bolstered the career of many well-known actors who have appeared in dozens of starring and co-starring Film/Television roles. R.J. Adams' son Rob Adams now owns and runs The Actors Workshop and has been coaching actors for thirty four years. Rob Adams is credited with coaching such stars as Quinton Jackson, Sarah Lancaster, Warren G, Wayne Bastrup, Annet Mahendru, David Farkas and Tiffany. Today The Actors Workshop is currently ranked as the number 3 Best acting school in California.

== Studio facility ==
In early 1990, the workshop added a Television studio. The studio is used for training, filming auditions, demo reels and overall growth of the students. Through the years, Television and film directors such as Dennis Steinmetz, Richard Compton, Ron Stephenson, Corey Allen and Michael O'Herlihy make regular appearances at the school. Casting directors from major television stations CBS, NBC and production companies Lorimar, 20th century looked for prospects at weekly showcases.
