= Sunny Hills High School =

Location
- 1801 Lancer Way; Fullerton, California 92833; United States; 33°53′02″N 117°57′14″W

Information
- School type: Public, high school
- Established: 1959; 67 years ago
- School district: Fullerton Joint Union High School District
- Principal: Craig Weinreich
- Teaching staff: 89.48 (FTE)
- Grades: 9–12
- Gender: Co-educational
- Enrollment: 2,434 (2023-2024)
- Student to teacher ratio: 27.20
- Campus: Suburban
- Campus size: 42 acres (170,000 m^{2})
- Colors: Black and gold
- Athletics: 16 sports
- Athletics conference: CIF Southern Section
- Nickname: Lancers
- Rival: Troy Warriors
- Newspaper: The Accolade
- Yearbook: Helios
- Website: www.sunnyhills.net

Sunny Hills High School (SHHS) is a public high school located in Fullerton, California, United States. Established in 1959, it is part of the Fullerton Joint Union High School District.

The campus, consisting mostly of single-story open plan buildings, is situated on 42 acres (170,000 m^{2}) in western Fullerton.

SHHS has been an International Baccalaureate World School since 1987, and hosts the largest IB program in California. SHHS also offers Advanced Placement classes to its students. It has been recognized four times as a California Distinguished School, in 1988, 1994, 2009, and 2019, and recognized as one of the top high schools in the United States in the March 30, 1998, March 13, 2000, and June 2003 issues of Newsweek magazine. At 284 in the magazine's latest (2007) rankings of public high schools, Sunny Hills remains in the top 0.1 percent of schools in the country. Sunny Hills was presented with the National Blue Ribbon School Award in 2012.

The school contains the Sunny Hills Performing Arts Center, a notable venue in Orange County for classical performances.

== Notable alumni ==
- Paul Abbott, former MLB player
- Kathryn Bigelow, Academy Award-winning film director (Zero Dark Thirty, The Hurt Locker, Point Break, Near Dark)
- Shane Black, screenwriter and director
- Jackson Browne, folk singer and Rock & Roll Hall of Famer
- Gary Carter, former MLB player and Baseball Hall of Famer and World Champion with the New York Mets
- Kelly Fremon Craig, film director and screenwriter, The Edge of Seventeen
- Leanna, Monica, and Joy Creel, identical triplet actresses, Parent Trap III
- Tarek El Moussa, TV personality
- David Farkas, actor and musician
- Mike Fleiss, executive producer of The Bachelor, Poseidon and The Texas Chainsaw Massacre
- Jim Karsatos, Ohio State quarterback, Cotton Bowl Champion
- Brian Kelley, former NFL 11-year veteran inside linebacker for the New York Giants
- Justin Lee, actor on Arrested Development and Shredderman Rules
- Larry MacDuff, NFL defensive coordinator and special teams coordinator for various NFL teams
- Camille Mana, film actress
- Eric Mun, actor, singer and rapper of Korean band Shinhwa
- Austin St. John, the Red Ranger in Mighty Morphin Power Rangers and Gold Ranger in Power Rangers: Zeo
- Massy Tadjedin, screenwriter of The Jacket
- Martha Nix Wade, actress, Days of Our Lives and The Waltons
- David S. Ward, screenwriter and director (The Sting, King Ralph, Major League, Sleepless in Seattle)
- Robert Weide, Emmy, Golden Globe-winning and Oscar-nominated filmmaker
- Brad Williams, comedian and actor, regularly appears on Mind of Mencia
- Steve Yoo, Korean singer (Yoo Seung Joon)
- Allison Fonte, Actress/Mouseketeer (The New Mickey Mouse Club)
- Junoflo, Korean-American rapper and producer
