= Marty Pevey =

American baseball player and manager (born 1962)

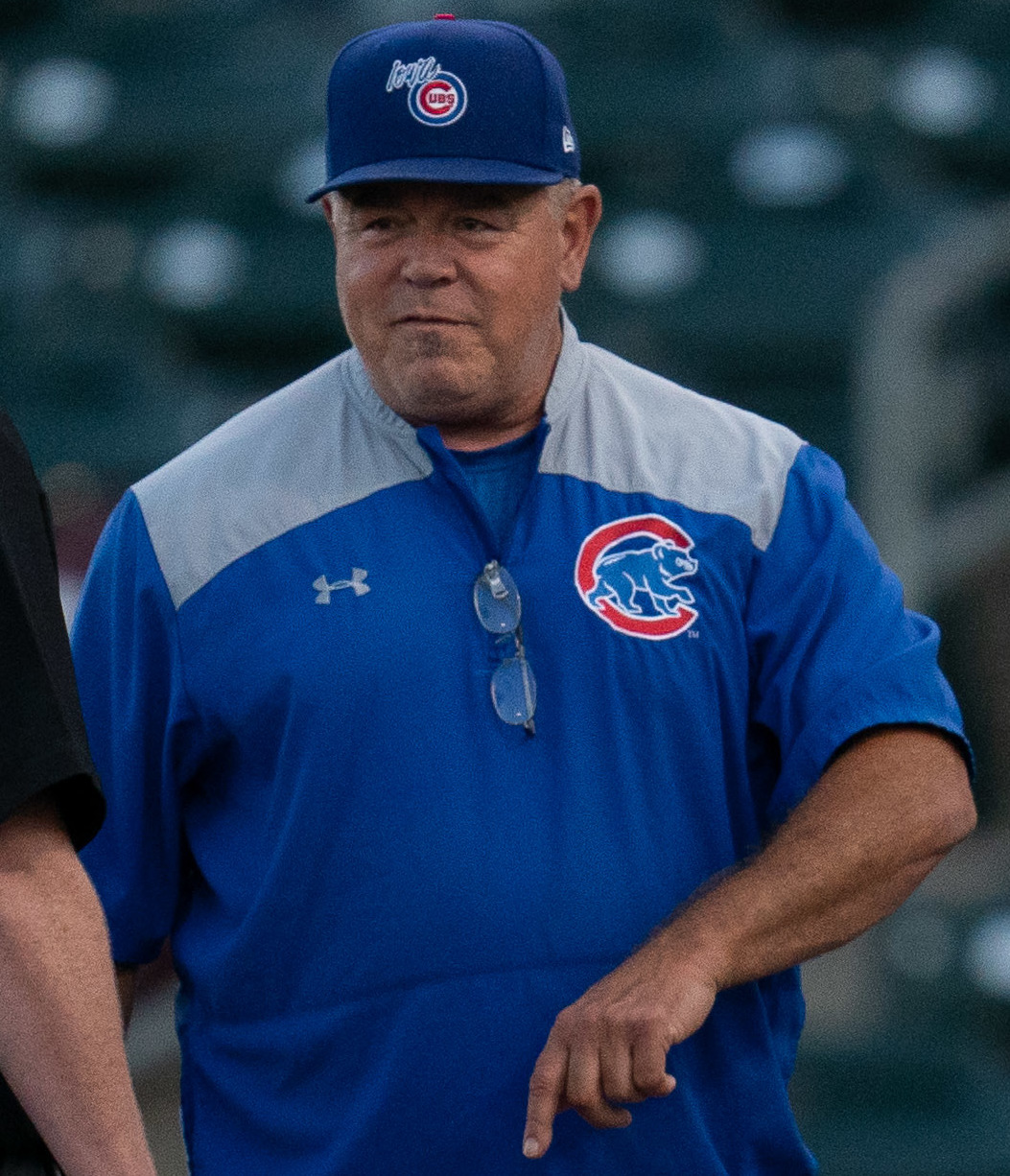
- Pevey managing the Iowa Cubs in 2021
- Catcher
- Born: December 25, 1962 (age 63); Savannah, Georgia, U.S.
- Batted: Left Threw: Right

MLB debut
- May 16, 1989, for the Montreal Expos

Last MLB appearance
- June 29, 1989, for the Montreal Expos

MLB statistics
- Batting average: .220
- Home runs: 0
- Runs batted in: 3
- Stats at Baseball Reference

Teams
- Montreal Expos (1989)

Marty Ashley Pevey (born December 25, 1962) is an American professional baseball manager and former Major League catcher and coach. He has been the manager of the Chicago Cubs' Triple-A affiliate, the Iowa Cubs of the International League, since 2013. Pevey stood 6 feet 1 inch (1.85 m) tall and weighed 185 pounds (84 kg); he batted left-handed and threw right-handed.

== Playing career ==
After playing collegiately for the Georgia Southern Eagles, he was selected in the 19th round (474th overall) of the 1982 Major League Baseball draft by the Minnesota Twins, but he was released after only two months in the Rookie-level Appalachian League. He resumed his pro career when the St. Louis Cardinals signed him as a free agent the following season.

Pevey's playing career lasted for 13 seasons (through 1995, with the exception of 1990, which he missed with an injury). In his only Major League trial, he appeared in 13 games played, 11 as a starting catcher, for the 1989 Montreal Expos. He had one double and one triple among his nine big-league hits. In 1995, he was a replacement player in spring training for the Seattle Mariners, being named the team's provisional roster before the players' strike ended.

== Managerial career ==
As a manager, Pevey has worked at all levels of minor league baseball, starting in the Toronto Blue Jays' organization at the Rookie level (Medicine Hat Blue Jays), then moving up the ladder to the Low-A (Hagerstown Suns), High-A (Dunedin Blue Jays), Double-A (the Eastern League's New Haven Ravens), and Triple-A (the International League's Syracuse Sky Chiefs).

In 1999, Pevey served as bullpen coach on the major league staff of Toronto manager Jim Fregosi. At the end of the 2005 season, he returned to the MLB Jays when was named Toronto's first base coach, replacing Ernie Whitt, who returned to the bench coach position after serving as both bench coach and first base coach for most of the season. Pevey coached third base for the Blue Jays in 2008 when he was fired along with manager John Gibbons (then in his first term as Toronto's pilot) on June 20, 2008.

In 2009, Pevey joined the Cubs' farm system as manager of the Single-A Peoria Chiefs, then worked for three seasons (2010–2012) as the Cubs' minor league catching coordinator. In 2013, his first as pilot of the Iowa Cubs, Pevey led them to a 66–78 record and third place in their division. Through 13 minor league seasons, Pevey's teams have compiled an 864–829 (.510) mark. He is the third manager in Iowa Cubs history to serve three or more consecutive seasons as the club's manager. He is the winningest coach for the Iowa Cubs and won his 1,000th game as a minor league manager in 2018.

Sporting positions
Preceded by Sal Butera	Toronto Blue Jays bullpen coach 1999	Succeeded by Roly de Armas
Preceded by Mark DeJohn	New Haven Ravens manager 2003	Succeeded by Franchise relocated
Preceded by Omar Malavé	Syracuse SkyChiefs manager 2004–2005	Succeeded by Mike Basso
Preceded by Mickey Brantley	Toronto Blue Jays first base coach 2006–2007	Succeeded by Ernie Whitt
Preceded by Brian Butterfield	Toronto Blue Jays third base coach 2008; April 1–June 19	Succeeded by Nick Leyva
Preceded by Dave Bialas	Iowa Cubs manager 2013–	Succeeded by Incumbent
