= Sunny Hills Performing Arts Center =

Performing arts hall in California, U.S.

Coordinates: 33°53′0″N 117°57′13″W

Sunny Hills Performing Arts Center is a performing arts hall in Fullerton, California. It has a capacity for 360 people and regularly hosts concerts and is a venue for Sunny Hills High School. It is a notable venue for classical concerts in Orange County. Fullerton Friends of Music, the oldest chamber music society in Orange County, perform five concerts a year at the venue.
