= R. J. Adams =

Canadian-American actor (1942–2015)

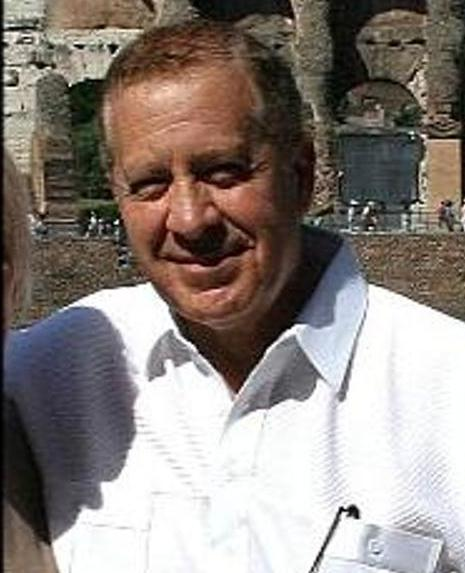
- Born: Robert Lee Adams; September 20, 1942; St. Catharines, Ontario, Canada
- Died: January 26, 2015 (aged 72); Coatesville, Pennsylvania, USA
- Occupations: Actor, acting coach, radio personality, producer, screenwriter
- Years active: 1967–2015
- Spouse: Diane Adams (m. 1967)
- Children: Rob Adams

R. J. Adams, also known as Bob Shannon (September 20, 1942 – January 26, 2015), was a Canadian-American film and television actor, acting coach, screen writer, film producer, documentary producer and radio personality.

== Beginnings ==
Adams was born in St. Catharines, Ontario, where he spent his early childhood, until his family headed across the border to Niagara Falls, New York. Known to his friends as Bob Adams, the aspiring actor/radio DJ spent just a couple of years attending Bishop Duffy High School before dropping out and moving to New York City at the age of 17 to study acting. Upon his arrival on the west coast, he landed a job as a page at NBC Burbank which led to a radio job in Phoenix and ultimately a twenty-five-year career in broadcasting as Bob Shannon. His on-air career included radio stations in markets such as Buffalo, Cleveland, Pittsburgh, St. Louis, Seattle, Minneapolis/St. Paul, San Diego and Los Angeles. It was while working at KFI (AM) in the mid-1970s that Adams turned his attention back to film acting.

== Radio career ==
Adams began his 30-year radio career as Bob Shannon at KXIV Phoenix, Arizona until going full-time, thanks to the efforts of play-by-play announcer Al McCoy, who got him his first full-time on-air job at KBLU Yuma, Arizona. From there it was on to KUTY Palmdale, California before making the leap to KDWB St. Paul, Minnesota by the end of the year. It wasn't until Shannon arrived in Phoenix that he garnered his first major success at KRUX by rapidly climbing to number one in the market by beating all competitors by twenty plus points, utilizing a variety of crazy characters and outlandish antics such as the invasion of his show by the television rock group, The Monkees. The episode aired as the finale of the group's first season.

Following his departure from Phoenix, Shannon held air shifts at WKBW Buffalo, New York and WKYC Cleveland, Ohio until landing the coveted early evening slot at KXOK St. Louis, Missouri where he again rose to the number one show in the market, beating his nearest rival by over twenty ratings points.

== BS in the morning ==
Following St. Louis, Shannon joined a couple of famous stations, including KJR Seattle, Washington, WIXY Cleveland, Ohio and KDKA, before returning to KDWB Mpls/St.Paul as "BS" in the morning. It was here that he gained instant popularity by a myriad of stunts such as broadcasting live from the streets of the Twin Cities while distributing cans of beans during the gas shortage of the mid-1970s which he promoted as a "natural gas substitute". His name recognition eventually brought him to the attention of KFI Los Angeles in 1975, where he enjoyed several successful years doing afternoons as "BS in Drive".

In 1976 Shannon with the help of his vast audience, as well as the national media, succeeded in persuading NOA, the National Oceanic and Atmospheric Administration to adopt male hurricane names in an effort to bring equal hurricane rights to men. Up until that time hurricanes had only been named for women. His successful campaign brought about the naming of Hurricane David, the name of Shannon's son.

From KFI, he went on to KHJ (AM) and KLAC, Los Angeles before retiring from radio in the mid-1980s to devote his attention to film acting.

In 2000 Adams returned to the airwaves once again as Bob Shannon, this time joining the air staff of KRTH 101 in Los Angeles. He is not to be confused with a radio personality of the same name who is midday host on New York City's most popular radio station, classic-hits WCBS-FM.

In 2003 he ventured into talk radio as host of Back Stage Live, a film and television call-in program specifically geared toward aspiring and professional actors on "Smart Talk" KRLA.

In 2011, Adams played a serial-killing priest in a dark suspense thriller.

== Film and television acting ==
From 1975 to 1978, Adams studied under acting coach Charles E. Conrad. He was cast in a variety of shows, including Hotel, The Practice, Archie Bunker's Place, General Hospital, Kojak and Hill Street Blues. From the 1980s to the 2000s, Adams appeared in dozens of film and television projects including Rocky IV, The Execution, Falling Through, and Murder, She Wrote, and was a series regular on Riptide. He starred in four feature films for which he wrote the screenplay: Abeo Pharisee, The Studio Club, Chasing Jose, and The Christmas Quilt.

== Film and television acting coach ==
Shortly after leaving the Charles E. Conrad Studio in 1978, Adams began teaching a handful of actors from the local community college. That led to a 35-year coaching career at The Actors Workshop. His former students include Kristy Swanson, Brian Krause, Sarah Lancaster. Vicellous Reon Shannon, Schae Harrison and Annet Mahendru. Adams appeared as a panelist for the Screen Actors Guild Foundation and conducted SAG-AFTRA acting workshops in Los Angeles and San Diego.

== Documentary producer ==
In 1976, Adams founded Shannon & Company, which served Orange County and Los Angeles as a full service advertising agency until the company converted to a broadcast and film production company in the 1980s, focusing primarily on historical documentary projects and docudramas. The company rolled out a number of films, including Ruins of the Reich, The Missions of California, Order Castles of the Third Reich and The Final Journey.

Ownership of Shannon & Company changed when R.J. Adams' son, Rob Adams, took control of the company in the spring of 2000 and steered the company toward the production of feature films and episodic television.

== Personal life ==
Adams and his wife, Diane, were married for 48 years. His children Jill, Robert, David and Kara. Son, actor Rob Adams, is the owner and acting coach at The Actors Workshop.

Adams was an FAA licensed IFR/Commercial pilot and flew various planes ranging from the Cessna 150 to the Cessna CE 550 corporate jet.

Adams died of a heart attack in Coatesville, Pennsylvania on January 26, 2015. He was 72.
