= Gary Carter =

American baseball player, coach, and sportscaster (1954–2012)

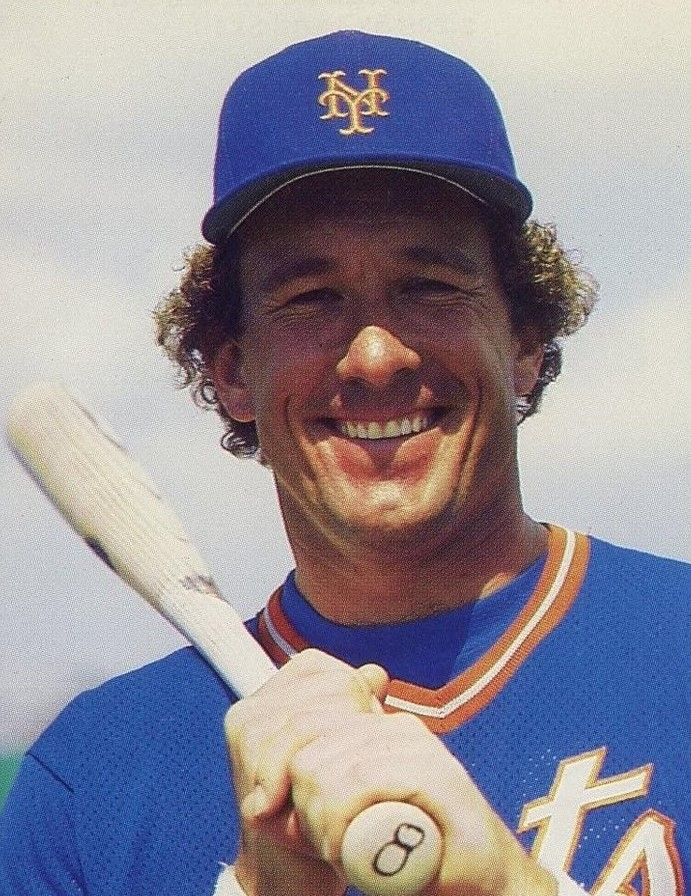
- Carter with the New York Mets, c. 1986
- Catcher
- Born: April 8, 1954; Culver City, California, U.S.
- Died: February 16, 2012 (aged 57); Palm Beach Gardens, Florida, U.S.
- Batted: Right Threw: Right

MLB debut
- September 16, 1974, for the Montreal Expos

Last MLB appearance
- September 27, 1992, for the Montreal Expos

MLB statistics
- Batting average: .262
- Hits: 2,092
- Home runs: 324
- Runs batted in: 1,225
- Stats at Baseball Reference

Teams
- Montreal Expos (1974–1984); New York Mets (1985–1989); San Francisco Giants (1990); Los Angeles Dodgers (1991); Montreal Expos (1992)

Career highlights and awards
- 11× All-Star (1975, 1979–1988); World Series champion (1986); 3× Gold Glove Award (1980–1982); 5× Silver Slugger Award (1981, 1982, 1984–1986); Roberto Clemente Award (1989); NL RBI leader (1984); Montreal Expos No. 8 retired; Montreal Expos Hall of Fame; Washington Nationals Ring of Honor; New York Mets Hall of Fame

Member of the National

Baseball Hall of Fame
- Induction: 2003
- Vote: 78.0% (sixth ballot)

Gary Edmund Carter (April 8, 1954 – February 16, 2012) was an American professional baseball catcher whose 19-year Major League Baseball (MLB) career was spent primarily with the Montreal Expos and New York Mets. Nicknamed "the Kid" for his youthful exuberance, Carter was named an All-Star 11 times and was a member of the 1986 World Series champion Mets.

Carter was known throughout his career for his hitting, excellent defense, ability to handle pitchers and on-field leadership. He made clutch contributions to the Mets' World Series championship in 1986, including a 12th-inning single against the Houston Astros to win Game 5 of the NLCS and a 10th-inning single against the Boston Red Sox to start the comeback rally in Game 6 of the World Series. He is one of only four players to be named captain of the Mets, and the Expos retired his number 8.

After leaving the major leagues, Carter coached baseball at the college and minor-league levels. In 2003, Carter was inducted into the National Baseball Hall of Fame, becoming the first Hall of Famer whose plaque depicts him as a member of the Montreal Expos.

== Early life ==
Carter was born in the Los Angeles suburb of Culver City in 1954 to Jim Carter, an aircraft worker, and his wife, Inge. One month after Carter turned 12 in 1966, his 37-year-old mother died of leukemia.

Athletic at a young age, Carter, along with four other boys, won the seven-year-old category of the first national Punt, Pass, and Kick skills competition in 1961. Carter attended Sunny Hills High School in Fullerton, where he played football as a quarterback and baseball as an infielder, graduating in 1972. He also played American Legion Baseball and was named the 1971 American Legion Graduate of the Year.

After receiving more than 100 athletic scholarship offers, Carter signed a letter of intent to play football for the UCLA Bruins as a quarterback, but then signed with the Montreal Expos after they selected him in the third round (53rd overall) of the 1972 Major League Baseball draft.

== Playing career ==
=== Montreal Expos ===
Carter earned his nickname of "the Kid" during his first spring training camp with the Expos in 1974.

==== Rookie season ====
The Expos converted Carter to a catcher in the minor leagues. In 1974, he hit 23 home runs and drove in 83 runs for the Expos' Triple-A affiliate, the Memphis Blues. Following a September callup, Carter made his major league debut at Jarry Park in Montreal in the second game of a doubleheader against the New York Mets on September 16. Despite batting 0–4 in his debut game, he finished the season batting .407 (11–27). His first major-league hits came in both games of an Expos sweep of another doubleheader with the Mets on September 18, as a pinch hitter in the seventh inning of the opener and as the catcher in the second game. His first MLB home run occurred on September 28 against Steve Carlton in a 3–1 victory over the visiting Philadelphia Phillies.

Carter split time between right field and catching during his rookie season (1975), and was selected for the National League All-Star team as a right fielder. He did not have a plate appearance in the game but played as a defensive replacement for Pete Rose in the ninth inning, when he caught Rod Carew's fly ball for the final out of the NL's 6–3 victory. In his rookie season, Carter hit .270 with 17 home runs and 68 runs batted in, receiving the Sporting News Rookie of the Year Award and finishing second to San Francisco Giants pitcher John Montefusco for the National League Rookie of the Year award. He was also voted the Expos Player of the Year, an award that he also won in 1977, 1980 and 1984.

==== Expos catcher ====
Carter again split time in the outfield and behind the plate in 1976. Limited to 91 games by a broken finger, he batted just .219 with six home runs and 38 RBIs. In 1977, young stars Warren Cromartie, Ellis Valentine and Andre Dawson became full-time outfielders. In mid-June, former starting catcher Barry Foote was traded to the Phillies, allowing for more starts for Carter behind the plate. With little time at other positions, he responded with 31 home runs and 84 RBIs. In 1980, Carter hit 29 home runs, drove in 101 runs and earned the first of three consecutive Gold Glove Awards. In the NL MVP balloting, he finished second to third baseman Mike Schmidt of the Phillies, who won the National League East by one game over the Expos.

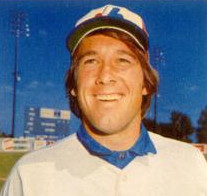
Carter with the Expos

Carter caught Charlie Lea's no-hitter on May 10, 1981, the nightcap of a doubleheader split, during the first half of the strike-shortened season. The season resumed on August 9, with Carter playing in the 1981 All-Star Game, hitting two home runs and winning the game's MVP award. He became the fifth and most recent player to hit two home runs in the All-Star Game.

MLB split the fractured 1981 season into two halves, with the first-place teams from each half in each division meeting in a best-of-five divisional playoff series. The four survivors moved on to two best-of-five League Championship Series. The Expos won the NL East's second half with a 30–23 record. In his first postseason, Carter batted .421, hit two home runs and drove in six in the Expos' victory over the Phillies in the division series. Carter's average improved to .438 in the NLCS, with no home runs or RBIs, and his Expos lost to the Los Angeles Dodgers in five games.

Canadian prime minister Pierre Trudeau once remarked: "I am certainly happy that I don't have to run for election against Gary Carter." However, some Expos were unhappy with Carter's unabashed enthusiasm, feeling that he was too absorbed in his image and that he basked in his press coverage too eagerly, derisively naming him "Camera Carter." Andre Dawson felt that Carter was "more a glory hound than a team player."

==== 1984 season ====
Carter hit the decisive home run in the 1984 All-Star Game, earning him his second All-Star Game MVP award. Carter's 106 RBIs (an NL lead), 159 games played, .294 batting average, 175 hits and 290 total bases were personal highs.

The 1984 Expos finished fifth in the NL East. At the end of the season, the rebuilding Expos chafed at Carter's salary demands and traded him in December to the Mets for Hubie Brooks, Mike Fitzgerald, Herm Winningham and Floyd Youmans.

=== New York Mets ===
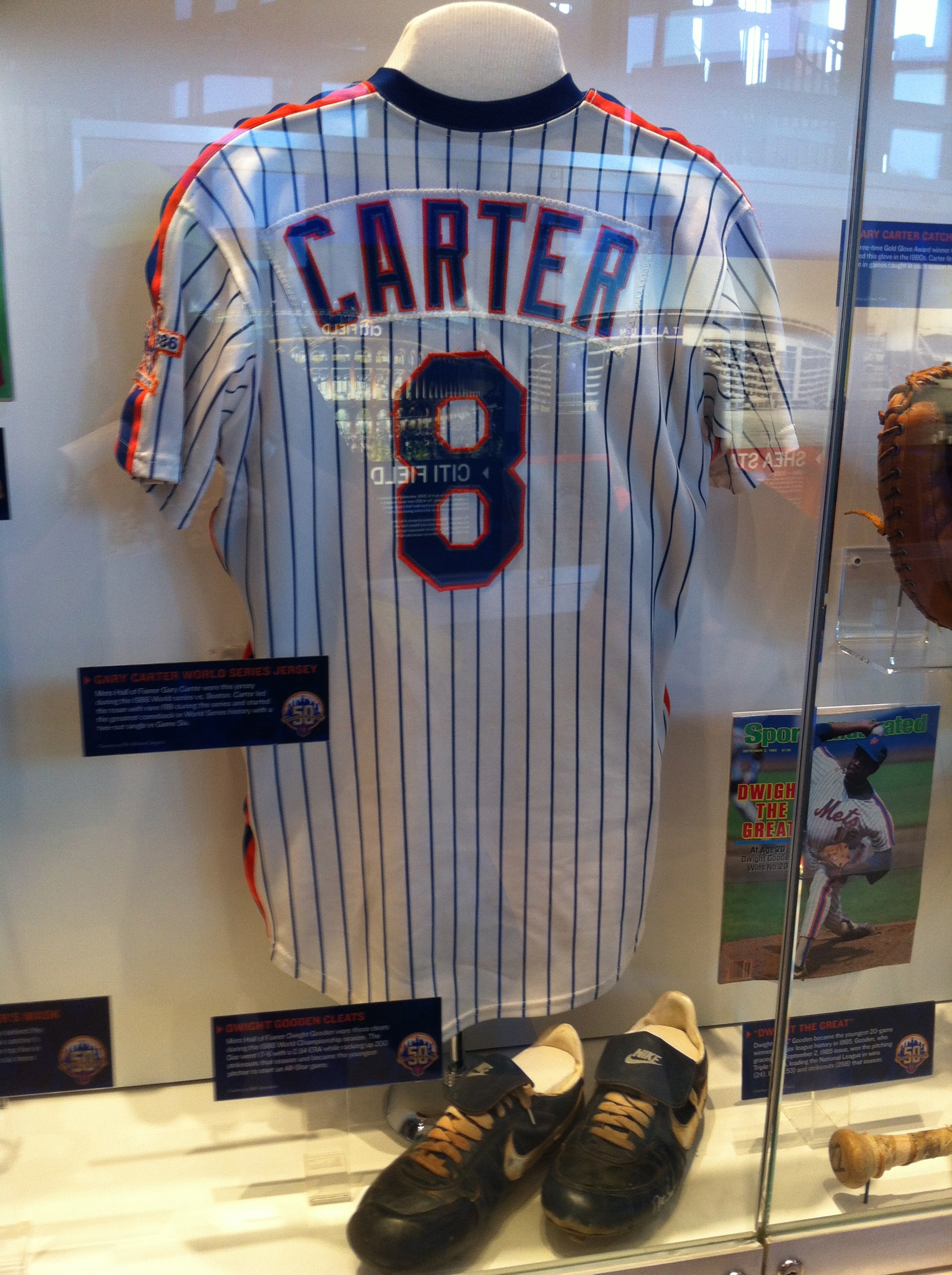
Carter's jersey at Citi Field Hall of Fame & Museum in New York

In his first game with New York on April 9, 1985, Carter hit a tenth-inning walk-off home run to give the Mets a 6–5 victory over the St. Louis Cardinals. The Mets and Cardinals rivaled for the National League East championship, with Carter and former Cardinals first baseman Keith Hernandez leading the Mets. The Mets won 98 games but lost a tight race for the division crown by three games to the Cardinals. Carter hit a career-high 32 home runs and drove in 100 runs. The Mets had three players finish in the top ten in NL MVP balloting that season (Dwight Gooden fourth, Carter sixth and Hernandez eighth).

==== 1986 World Series champions ====
In 1986, the Mets won 108 games and took the National League East by 21 1/2 games over the Phillies. Carter suffered a postseason slump in the NLCS, batting .148. However, he hit a walk-off RBI single to win Game 5. Carter also had two hits in Game 6, which the Mets won in 16 innings.

The Mets won the World Series in seven games over the Boston Red Sox. Carter batted .276 with nine RBIs in his first World Series and hit two home runs over Fenway Park's Green Monster in Game Four. He is the only player to hit two home runs in both an All-Star Game (1981) and a World Series game. Carter started a two-out rally in the tenth inning of Game 6, scoring the first of three Mets runs in the inning on a single by Ray Knight. He also hit an eighth-inning sacrifice fly that tied the game. Carter finished third on the NL MVP ballot in 1986.

==== 1987–1988 ====
Carter batted .235 in 1987 and ended the season with 291 career home runs. He had 299 home runs by May 16, 1988 after a fast start, then slumped until August 11 against the Chicago Cubs at Wrigley Field when he hit his 300th. During his home-run drought, Carter was named co-captain of the team with Hernandez, who had been named captain the previous season.

Carter ended 1988 with 11 home runs and 46 RBIs, his lowest totals since 1976. He ended the season with 10,360 career putouts as a catcher, breaking the career mark of Detroit Tigers catcher Bill Freehan (9,941).

The Mets won 100 games that season, taking the NL East by 15 games. Heavily favored, they were upset by the Los Angeles Dodgers in the NLCS. Carter batted .183 in 50 games for the Mets in 1989. In November, the Mets released Carter after five seasons, during which he had hit 89 home runs and drove in 349 runs.

=== After the Mets ===
Released by the Mets after the 1989 season, Carter subsequently joined the San Francisco Giants. At age 36, he platooned with catcher Terry Kennedy in 1990, batting .254 with nine home runs. With the Los Angeles Dodgers in 1991, Carter again found himself in a pennant race, with the Dodgers finishing one game behind the Atlanta Braves in the National League West.

At the end of the season, Carter returned to Montreal for his final season, claimed off waivers from the Dodgers. Carter was still nicknamed "the Kid" by teammates despite his age. In his last career at-bat on September 27, 1992, he hit a game-winning RBI double over the head of Chicago Cubs right-fielder and former Expos teammate Andre Dawson. Carter was given a standing ovation. The Expos finished 87–75 and in second place behind the Pittsburgh Pirates in the National League East.

=== Career statistics ===
Over a 19-year major league career, Carter was an 11-time All-Star, won three Gold Glove Awards and won five Silver Slugger Awards. He played in 2,296 games, accumulating 2,092 hits in 7,971 at bats for a .262 career batting average, along with 324 home runs, 1,225 runs batted in and a .335 on-base percentage. He hit 307 home runs as a catcher, ranking him seventh all-time at the position. His 1,225 career runs batted in also ranks seventh all-time among major-league catchers.

Carter's 2,056 games played as a catcher rank him fourth on the all-time list. He caught 127 shutouts during his career, ranking him sixth all-time. He led National League catchers eight times in putouts, five times in assists and three times in baserunners caught stealing. His 810 baserunners caught stealing are the most for any major-league catcher since the end of the dead-ball era, when stolen bases were more prevalent. His 11,785 putouts and 149 double plays during his playing career both rank tenth all-time among major league catchers.

Carter's .991 career fielding percentage was five points above the league average during his playing career. When he broke the 100-assist barrier in 1977, he joined Johnny Bench and Jim Sundberg as the only major-league catchers to have more than 100 assists in a season since the end of World War II.

Carter amassed the second-highest career WAR for a catcher during his career, behind Johnny Bench.

== Post-playing career ==
After his retirement as a player, Carter served as an analyst for Florida Marlins television broadcasts from 1993 to 1996. He also appeared in the film The Last Home Run (1998), which was filmed in 1996.

=== Hall of Fame ===
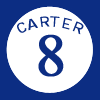
Gary Carter's number 8 was retired by the Montreal Expos in 2003.

Carter was elected to the Baseball Hall of Fame in his sixth year on the ballot on January 7, 2003. He became the first Hall of Famer whose plaque depicts a player with the Montreal Expos logo. Carter had originally expressed a preference during his final playing season to be inducted wearing an Expos cap. Given the uncertainty of the Expos franchise at the time, Carter's employment by the Mets organization since retiring as a player, his World Series title with the Mets and his media celebrity during his stint in New York, Carter shifted his preference to be enshrined with a Mets cap after his election to the Hall of Fame. The New York media strongly supported Carter's preference. Carter joked that "he wanted his Cooperstown cap to be a half-and-halfer, split between the Expos and Mets". The final decision rested with the Hall of Fame, whose president Dale Petroskey declared that Carter's achievements with the Expos over 12 season had earned his induction, whereas his five seasons with the Mets by themselves would not have, saying "we want to have represented on the plaque the team that best represents where a player made the biggest impact in his career. When you look at it, it's very clear. Gary Carter is an important part of the history of the Expos." Carter accepted the Hall's decision with grace, stating: "The fact I played 11 years in Montreal and the fact that the majority of my statistics and accomplishments were achieved there, it would be wrong, probably, to do it any other way." At the induction ceremony, Carter spoke some words in French, thanking fans in Montreal, while noting that the Mets' 1986 championship was the highlight of his career.

Carter was inducted into the New York Mets Hall of Fame in 2001. While the Mets have not retired number 8, it has remained unissued by the team since his election to the Hall of Fame in 2003. (Note: Nick Morabito was issued number 8 for his MLB debut with the Mets on May 19, 2026. He was subsequently switched to number 55.) In 2001, he was elected into the Canadian Baseball Hall of Fame along with Dave McKay, and his number 8 was retired by the Expos. After the Expos moved to Washington, D.C. to become the Washington Nationals following the 2004 season, a banner displaying Carter's number along with those of other Expos stars Andre Dawson, Tim Raines and Rusty Staub was hung from the rafters at the Bell Centre, home of the NHL's Montreal Canadiens. In Washington, Carter is recognized in the Ring of Honor at Nationals Park.

=== Coaching ===
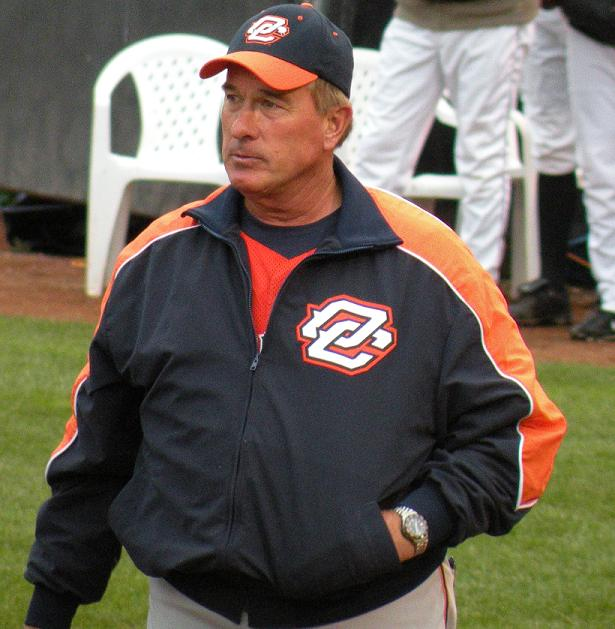
Carter with the Orange County Flyers in 2008

Carter was named Gulf Coast League Manager of the Year after his first season managing the Gulf Coast Mets in 2005. One year later, he was promoted to the A-level St. Lucie Mets, whom he guided to the 2006 Florida State League championship, again earning Manager of the Year honors. Carter was criticized, most notably by former teammate Keith Hernandez, for twice openly campaigning for the Mets' managerial position while it was still occupied by incumbents Art Howe in 2004 and Willie Randolph in 2008.

In 2008, Carter managed the Orange County Flyers of the Golden Baseball League, guiding his team to the GBL championship. He was named Manager of the Year. For the following season, Carter was named manager of the Long Island Ducks of the independent Atlantic League of Professional Baseball. The Ducks won the 2009 second-half Liberty Division title but were defeated by the Southern Maryland Blue Crabs in the Liberty Division playoffs.

In October 2009, Carter was named head baseball coach for the NCAA Division II Palm Beach Atlantic University Sailfish.

== Personal life ==
Carter met his future wife Sandy when they were students at Sunny Hills High School in Fullerton, California. They married in 1975 and had three children. His daughter Kimmy played catcher for the Florida State softball team from 1999 to 2002. She later served as the head softball coach at Palm Beach Atlantic University.

Carter was an active philanthropist and championed causes that fought leukemia and illiteracy. The Gary Carter Foundation (of which Carter was the president) supports eight Title I schools in Palm Beach County with students living in poverty. The foundation seeks to "better the physical, mental and spiritual well-being of children." To accomplish this, it advocates "school literacy by encouraging use of the Reading Counts Program, a program that exists in the Palm Beach County School District". Since its inception, the Gary Carter Foundation has placed more than $622,000 toward charitable purposes, including $366,000 to elementary schools for reading programs.

The 11th edition of the Merriam-Webster's Collegiate Dictionary, published in 2012, credits Carter, who rarely used profanity, with the first recorded use of the term "f-bomb."

=== Illness and death ===
In May 2011, Carter was diagnosed with four malignant tumors in his brain after experiencing headaches and forgetfulness. Doctors confirmed that he had a grade IV primary brain tumor known as glioblastoma multiforme. Doctors said that the extremely aggressive cancer was inoperable and that Carter would undergo other treatment methods to shrink his tumor. On January 20, 2012, Carter's daughter Kimmy posted on her blog that an MRI had revealed additional tumors on her father's brain. Even as he battled an aggressive form of brain cancer, Carter did not miss opening day for the college baseball team he coached.

Carter died on February 16, 2012 at the age of 57. Nine days later, the Mets announced that they were adding a memorial patch to their uniforms in Carter's honor for the entire 2012 season. The patch features a black home plate with the number 8 and "KID" inscribed on it. On the Mets' 2012 opening day, the Carter family unveiled a banner with a similar design on the centerfield wall of Citi Field.

The NHL's Montreal Canadiens, who had purchased the Expos' mascot Youppi! and hung retired numbers in its arena after the Expos' relocation to Washington, paid tribute to Carter by presenting a video montage and observing a moment of silence before a game against the New Jersey Devils on February 20, 2012. All Canadiens players took to the ice during pregame warmups wearing number 8 Carter jerseys, and Youppi! appeared wearing an Expos uniform. In addition, Youppi! wore a patch on his Canadiens jersey featuring a white circle with a blue number 8 inside it for the remainder of the season.

Tom Verducci, longtime Sports Illustrated baseball writer, reminisced about Carter following his death, "I cannot conjure a single image of Gary Carter with anything but a smile on his face. I have no recollection of a gloomy Carter, not even as his knees began to announce a slow surrender ... Carter played every day with the joy as if it were the opening day of Little League." "Gary actually took a lot of grief from his teammates for being a straight arrow. It wasn't the cool thing to do but on the same token, I think he actually served as a role model for a lot of these guys as they aged. He was the ballast of that team. They did have a lot of fun, there's no question about that, but they were also one of the fiercest, most competitive teams I've ever seen and obviously their comebacks from the '86 postseason defines that team. Carter was a huge part of that."

At Carter's memorial service, on February 24, 2012, Expo teammate Tommy Hutton made note of Carter's deep faith. The three loves in Carter's life, Hutton said, were his family, baseball and God.

Faillon Street West in Montreal, located near IGA Stadium, the tennis stadium built on the site of the former Parc Jarry, was renamed Gary Carter Street in his honor.

On March 28, 2014, during an exhibition game between the Toronto Blue Jays and the New York Mets at Olympic Stadium in Montreal, a banner was unveiled in honor of Carter in a special ceremony before the first pitch. Carter's widow Sandy and daughter Kimmy were present on the field for an emotional video tribute and the unveiling of the banner on the outfield wall, which reads "Merci! Thank You!" and contains an image of a baseball overlaid with Carter's retired number 8.

== See also ==
- DHL Hometown Heroes
- List of Gold Glove Award winners at catcher
- List of Silver Slugger Award winners at catcher
- List of Major League Baseball annual runs batted in leaders
- List of Major League Baseball career hits leaders
- List of Major League Baseball career home run leaders
- List of Major League Baseball career runs scored leaders
- List of Major League Baseball career runs batted in leaders
- List of Major League Baseball career double plays as a catcher leaders
- List of Major League Baseball career games played as a catcher leaders
- List of Major League Baseball career putouts as a catcher leaders

== Notes ==
Awards and achievements
Preceded by Dale Murphy; Willie McGee	National League Player of the Month; September 1980; September 1985	Succeeded by Dave Concepción; Johnny Ray
