= David Farkas =

American actor

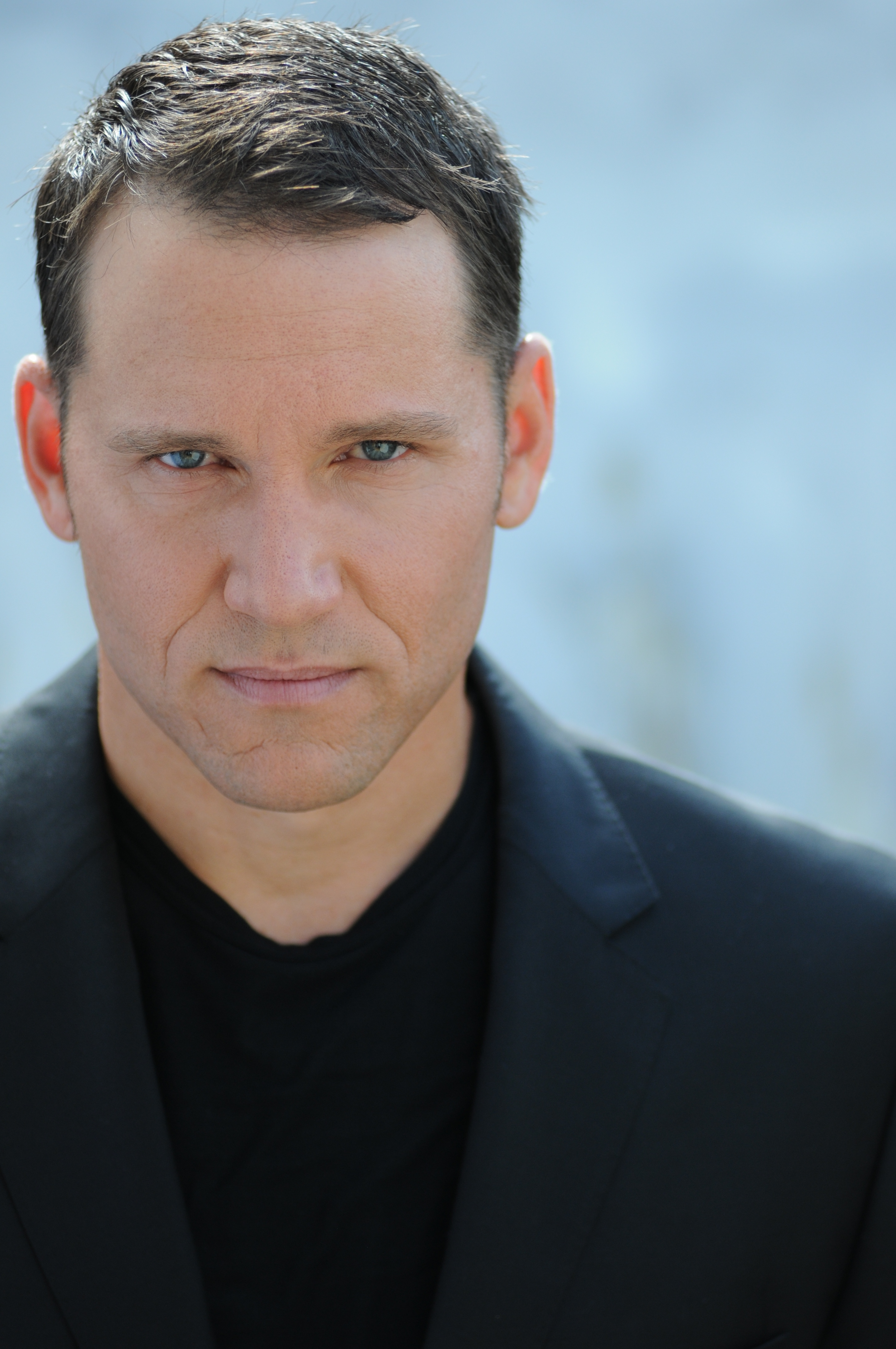
- Born: David Abraham Farkas; November 28, 1975 (age 50); Akron, Ohio, U.S.
- Occupations: Actor and musician
- Years active: 1998–present
- Website: www.davidfarkas.com

David Farkas (born November 28, 1975) is an American actor and musician.

== Biography ==
Farkas was born in Akron, Ohio, but Orange County, California has been his home since 1988. At Sunny Hills High School he was a member of an all-league water polo team. He was also a member of the North Orange County All-Star Team. He then played water polo at Claremont McKenna College where he was an All-SCIAC, All-American selection his senior year. He was also a two-time captain and a member of the CMS Athletic Wall of Fame.

== Theatre/TV/Film ==
After college, David started pursuing theatre. He worked at several theatre companies throughout Los Angeles and Orange County, performing as Joseph in Joseph and the Amazing Technicolor Dreamcoat, Jim in The Rainmaker, Johnny Case in Holiday, Joe in Heaven Can Wait, and Nick in Baby. He also played the title role, Conrad Birdie in Bye Bye Birdie at the Grove Theatre, and Buck Holden in Nite Club Confidential at the Sierra Repertory Theatre. Diane Nelson writes in her review of 'Nite Club' in The Union Democrat, "Equity actor David Farkas is a spiffy Buck Holden, with his Phillip Marlowe delivery and winning smile. He narrates the whole review, and still finds the energy to dance and sing like a pro." Playing the title role of Robbie in a musical version of The Wedding Singer, David played guitar on stage for the first time, and created a 'likable, wholly credible character...' without copying Sandler's screen portrayal.

During this time, David also started pursuing more television and film roles. His first part was in the daytime soap, The Bold and the Beautiful. He would go on later to have a recurring principal role on Passions, and a principal role on The Young and the Restless. His film debut as David A. Farkas came when he was cast in Flightplan (2005), starring Jodie Foster. He then played Chad in the suspense film Dark Mirror (2007), starring Lisa Vidal. He also had roles on Ghost Whisperer, Perception, NCIS: Los Angeles, All My Children, General Hospital, Wicked Wicked Games, and Criminal Minds. Currently in production, David plays Sgt. Eddie Bracket in Fatal Crossroads, a film which depicts the Malmedy massacre during WWII. In the Coaching Corner segment 'Filming Fatal Crossroads,' Director R.J. Adams documents some behind the scenes footage of the making of the film.

== Music ==
David and his wife Brittany Farkas released their debut album, Smilin', on December 5, 2016. Meredith Schneider from Impose Magazine called their debut album an 'Emotionally turbulent and fun work of art,' and New Jersey Stage Magazine writers Rich and Laura Lynch said David and Brittany 'aim to uplift and their first effort will leave you smiling, that's for sure.' Their second album, Our America, was released in 2018 and features the single 'First Lullaby.' Our America also 'features the single, 'Grace', a christian based song that the couple wrote about trust and faith.'

== Children’s Books ==
David published his first children’s book, Don’t Make Noise Lose With Poise: A Child's Guide To Losing, in November 2024. Alongside his wife, Brittany Farkas, who illustrated the book, the husband and wife team set out to teach kids how to deal with losing in a productive and positive way. Carol Thompson from Reader’s Favorite said the book ‘is a delightful and meaningful picture book that gently introduces young readers to the importance of handling setbacks gracefully.’ Ms. Thompson goes on to say that 'Brittany Farkas’s vibrant illustrations add charm to the narrative, capturing emotions and playful moments with expressive details.' Winner of the Book Excellence Award for Delilah and the Missing Curtains, the second book in their Child's Guide Series, Delilah follows the story of a young ant who has everything, except curtains. "Delilah is not just a picture book. It’s a tool for emotional literacy, a gentle meditation on gratitude, and a heartfelt reminder that contentment is a skill—not a possession."
