= Eagle River encounter =

Alleged UFO encounter in 1961

External videos
- Joe Simonton holding one of the pancakes during a 1968 interview with the BBC
- Simonton interview with remarks by Air Force officer Hector Quintanilla, chief of Project Blue Book
- Simonton interview from Flying Saucers and the People Who See Them (BBC, 1968)

In 1961, Joe Simonton of Eagle River, Wisconsin reported an encounter with an unidentified aircraft and its three occupants. His account, in which he gave the occupants water and received pancakes, was covered in popular media nationwide and internationally. Lab analysis revealed one fragment came from an "ordinary pancake of terrestrial origin".

The account, with its "humorous absurdity", was divisive even amongst UFO believers. In the ensuing years, the Eagle River story would be cited by skeptics and mainstream sources as an example of preposterous UFO accounts. Meanwhile, the story led some extreme-fringe UFO authors to reject the suggestion that UFO reports were caused by extra-terrestrial spaceships in favor of the idea that such tales might be caused by some paranormal phenomenon akin to fairies or elves.

The case has been described as "Wisconsin's most famous claim of alien encounters".

== Background ==
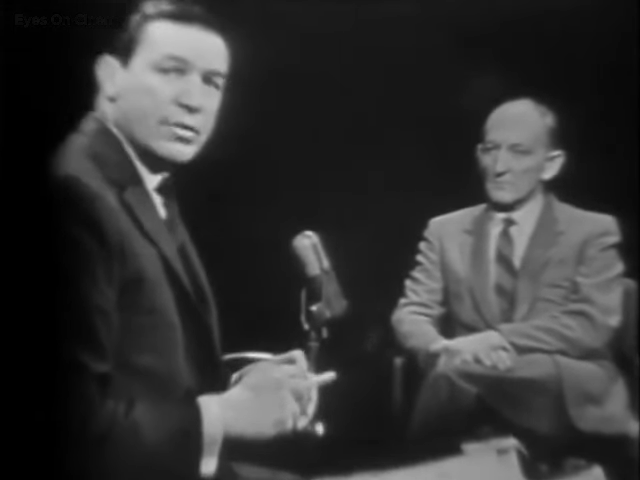
UFO conspiracy theorist and NICAP founder Donald Keyhoe (right) during a 1958 interview with Mike Wallace

By 1961, American popular culture and myth was abound with tales of aliens spaceships and government coverups, with Joe Simonton being exposed to such theories before his supposed encounter.

Since the 1947 flying disc craze, reports of unidentified aircraft led to speculation of secret, perhaps extraterrestrial, technology. After a 1952 nationwide spate of sighting culminating in mass UFO reports over Washington, D.C., a CIA study concluded continued public interest in the subject might pose grave risks to national security. The panel recommended a public education "debunking" campaign to reduce public interest in the subject and monitoring of civilian UFO groups.

Despite the efforts of Air Force debunkers like J. Allen Hynek, public interest grew alongside belief in conspiracies. By 1955, amateur UFO investigator Donald Keyhoe and his book The Flying Saucer Conspiracy publicly accused a "silence group" within the government of covering up flying saucer evidence "to protect the public from possible hysteria". The following year, 1956, Keyhoe founded the National Investigations Committee On Aerial Phenomena (NICAP), which quickly grew to become the largest civilian UFO group. The year 1961 marked "the high point" in their "campaign against the Air Force". NICAP board member Admiral Roscoe H. Hillenkoetter, a former director of the Central Intelligence Agency, publicly claimed that "Behind the scenes, high-ranking Air Force officers are soberly concerned about UFOs. But through official secrecy and ridicule, many citizens are led to believe the unknown flying objects are nonsense." After this, House leader John W. McCormack told the press "I feel the Air Force has not been giving out all the information it has on the Unidentified Flying Object" and called for hearings on the topic. Keyhoe told press that the incoming administration might "end the secrecy", saying "President Kennedy is on record that the UFO subject is important." On April 16, 1961, Hearst publication The American Weekly ran a lengthy article by Keyhoe.

One member of Donald Keyhoe's NICAP was Eagle River magistrate Frank Wellington Carter. A longtime-believer in a government coverup of UFOs, Judge Carter gave public talks on the subject of flying saucers and was locally known as an authority on the topic. One presentation titled "The Battle for the Moon" was attended by Joe Simonton, who learned there that Judge Carter led the local "UFO study group".

== Initial reports ==
Eagle River, Wisconsin

On April 23, 1961, papers nation-wide reported on a wire-service story of Joe Simonton, an Eagle River plumber who told of seeing a silver saucer days prior on Tuesday, April 18, around 11 AM.

Simonton, a former professional boxer and deputy sheriff, reportedly encountered three men aboard and was handed a jug which he filled with water and returned. In exchange, Simonton reported receiving "cakes" about three inches in diameter. Simonton described the cakes as tasting "just like cardboard". Simonton described the men as clean-shaven, looking like "ordinary human beings" with black shirts and trousers. He described the men as short in stature and looked of Italian descent. He noted one of the three men had a stripe of red trim on his trousers, which Simonton interpreted as perhaps a sign of rank.

He reported the craft made familiar hums like a generator or electric motor, and had exhaust pipes along one edge. According to the story, the saucer took off after about five minutes. He described it taking off with a blast of air that affected nearby pine trees, before flying away at a 45 degree angle.

Simonton relayed his account to local authorities and turned over the cakes to the local judge, Frank Carter. Press quoted the District Attorney as saying Simonton "had a good reputation and told a straightforward story", a sentiment echoed by the editor of the town's weekly newspaper who described Simonton as a trustworthy man. In an editorial, the paper denied having hoaxed the story as a publicity stunt.

== Reactions ==
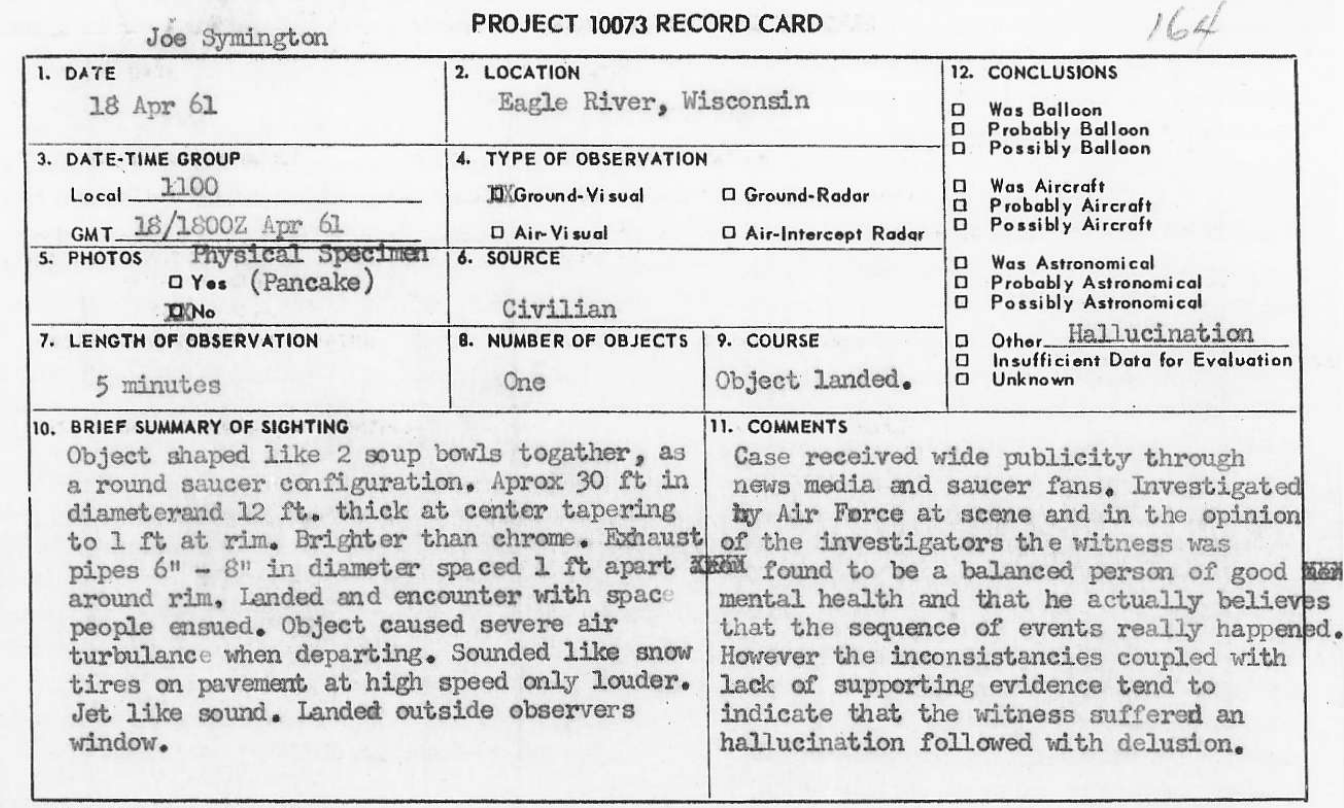
Project Blue Book investigation form for the Eagle River case

A local insurance agent claimed he also saw the saucer at about the same time as Simonton's report. Two local youths and their family reported having seen a saucer the following day.

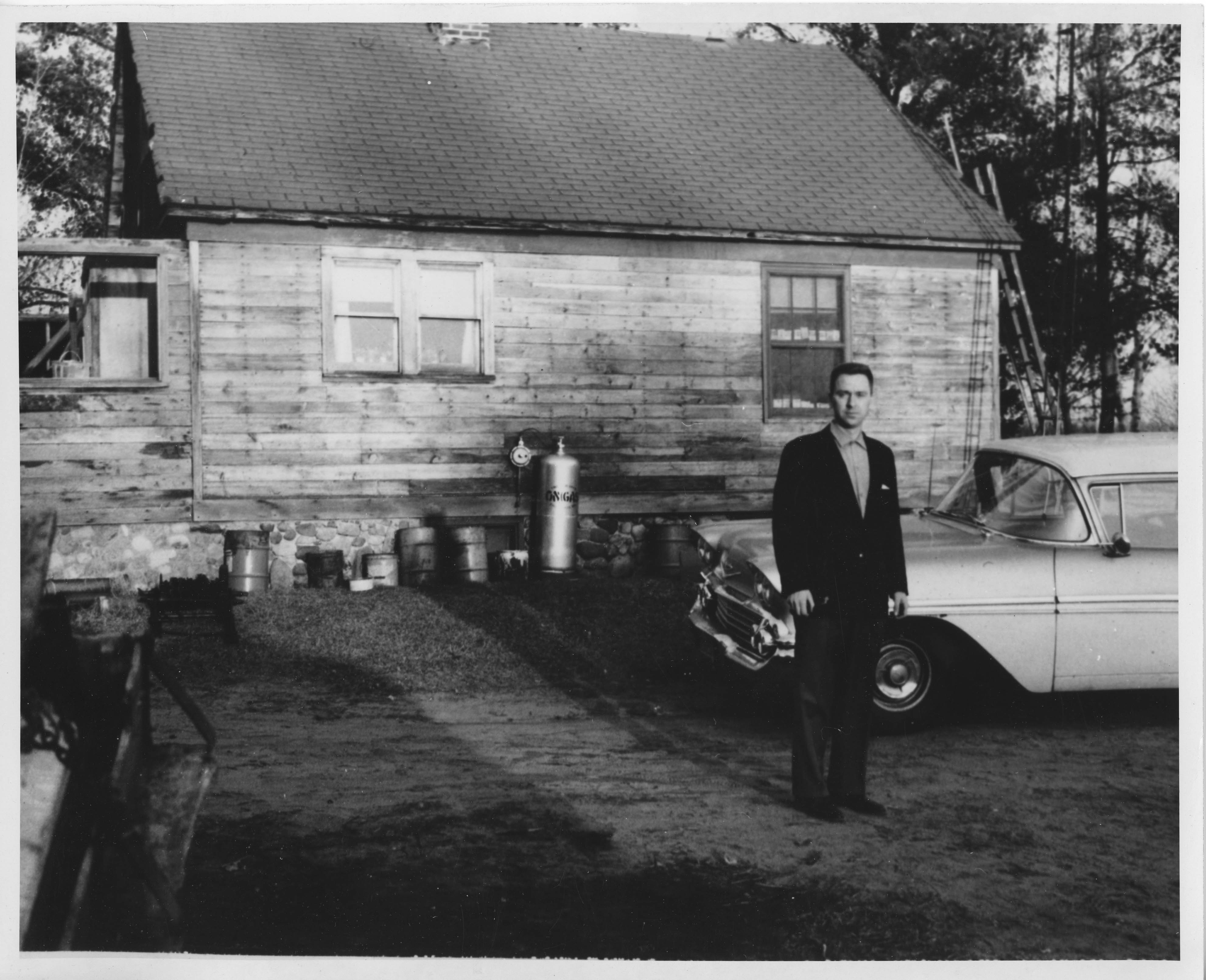
Investigator stands outside Simonton residence in photograph taken by USAF investigator J. Allen Hynek

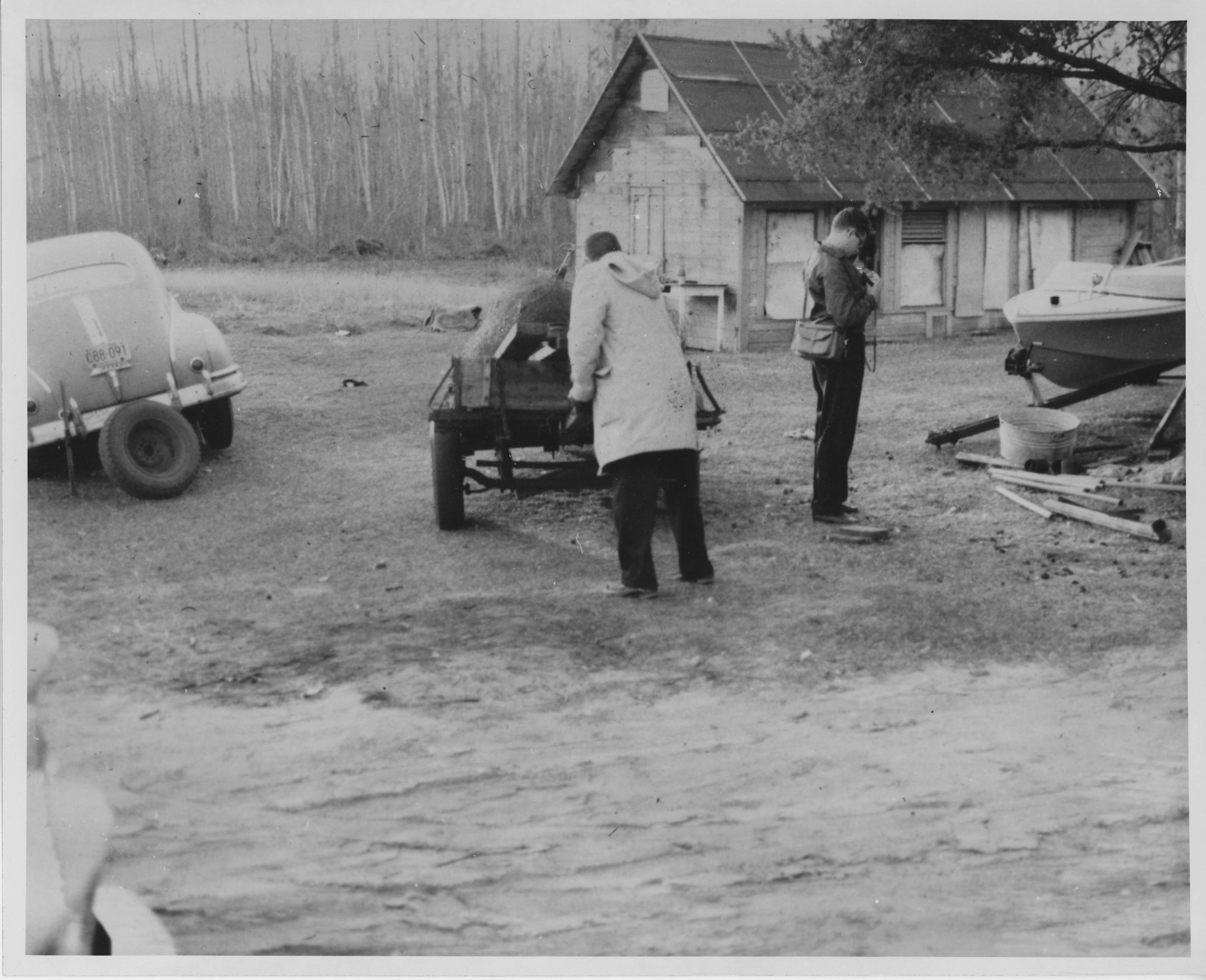
Walter Weller and John Tumlin outside Joe Simonton residence

The US Air Force's Air Technical Intelligence Command dispatched investigator J. Allen Hynek to Eagle River. He noted the local judge Frank Carter, a NICAP member, was hostile to the Air Force. Hynek concluded Simonton suffered from a hallucination followed by a delusion.

Simonton was flooded with inquiries and visitors. By May 3, Simonton complained about loss of work due to publicity and told papers: "If it happened again, I don't think I'd tell anybody about it." Simonton, who raised chickens, reported his birds became ill after the encounter, with many dying.

On May 4, a local supermarket advertisement offered the public a chance to meet and question Simonton as part of a promotional sale of Aunt Jemima Pancakes. A local politician lampooned Simonton's story as related to John F. Kennedy's so-called "Pie in the Sky", while another suggested the occupants ate local foods to "live as the natives do", not unlike "the members of Mr. Kennedy's Peace Corps." Local press suggested "Flying Saucers" as the theme for upcoming July festivities and nominated Simonton as parade king.

On May 11, Minnesota TV station KSTP announced an upcoming May 13 broadcast of their investigation into the case. On June 22, papers announced that a government analysis revealed the pancake contained ordinary ingredients: flour, sugar, salt, and cooked in oil.

=== Division amongst UFO believers ===
The Eagle River encounter was ultimately described by the Aerial Phenomena Research Organization as "one of the most controversial cases we have ever investigated". The case led UFO researcher Jacques Vallée to reject the claim that UFOs are related to extraterrestrials, becoming a self-described "heretic among heretics" who connected the encounter to folklore of fairies offering bread.

Local judge Frank Carter told press that he sent one of the cakes to civilian UFO group NICAP for analysis, but NICAP declined involvement, expressing skepticism to press and writing: "We are engaged in very important liaison work with Congress which may well lead to hearings on UFOs and we do not propose to compromise this work for the sake of an unproven and, you must admit, fantastic sounding claim. Accordingly, we do not wish to have any further publicity in connection with this claim". The April/May edition of NICAP's newsletter speculated that pancake story would "be used by the Air Force for added ridicule of serious UFO reports."

Carter authored a scathing reply, accusing NICAP of refusing to investigate "contact" cases, writing: "... perhaps you WANT to REMAIN with your eyes shut as to ANY contact story... Are you AFRAID to examine for fear it might result in a vindication of their story". Raymond A. Palmer, publisher of the pulp magazine Flying Saucers based in Amherst, Wisconsin, reprinted Carter's attack on NICAP. Palmer argued that "With the Keyhoe formula, nothing but complete failure in uncovering the truth can result."

The 1961 Congressional hearings never materialized and in 1962, APRO split with NICAP, after which the groups became bitter rivals In 1965, press described NICAP as waging a "two-front war": against the Air Force for allegedly "covering up the evidence that saucers exist" and against "the Saucerians for giving the whole business a bad name." The Simonton case was cited as an example of the latter.

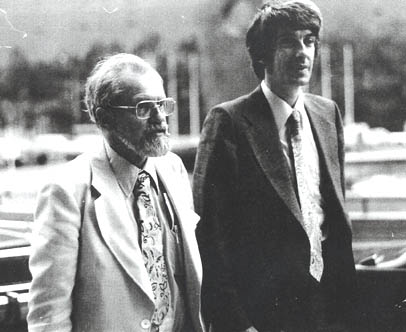
Vallée (right) with J. Allen Hynek

Jacques Vallée discussed the case in his 1969 book Passport to Magonia, where he compared Simonton's account to Celtic myths of food received from fairies or to the Exodus account of manna from heaven. Vallée and Keel cited the Eagle River incident in their rejection of the extraterrestrial hypothesis in favor of paranormal explanations variously labeled 'ultra-terrestrial' or 'interdimensional'. In 1977, "Discordian" author Robert Anton Wilson discussed Vallée's hypothesis, asking: "Did a leprechaun leave the Simonton pancakes?" Vallée returned to the Simonton case in his 2008 book Dimensions.

Hynek, now a UFO believer, revisited the Eagle River case in his 1975 book The Edge of Reality, co-authored with Vallée. "I'm beginning to think more of Joe Simonton than I did at that time. Interviewed in the press in 1978, Hynek said "The things [Simonton] said fit now, whereas they didn't fit, at least to me they didn't fit at that time." Hynek elaborated that because of its similarities to numerous subsequent cases, he tends to "give it more credence now."

In 2008, the Eagle River encounter was named one of the "five most bizarre UFO cases".

== Later publicity ==
In 1962, Simonton attended a "Space Age" convention in Chicago and was invited to speak as part of a "Space-O-Rama" event at Seattle's World's Fair. The San Francisco Examiner highlighted Simonton's story. In 1963, he was slated to talk to a Space Age convention on his experience. In 1965, Howard Margolis cited the case in the context of UFO conspiracy theories.

In 1965, Hector Quintanilla, chief of Project Blue Book, discussed the case alongside the recent Lonnie Zamora incident, a 1964 case where a New Mexico police officer reported the departure of two diminutive people aboard an unidentified aircraft that left imprints in the soil. Quintanilla exhibited a pancake to the press and the public. By 1966, Simonton's story had been featured in further TV reports. On May 9, 1968, BBC1 broadcast Flying Saucers and the People Who See Them, a 75-minute documentary by psychiatrist Stephen Black which included an interview with Simonton along with coverage of Zamora and the Betty and Barney Hill case.

In 1969, Simonton's home was destroyed in a fire. Simonton, born on February 5, 1901 in Potomac, Illinois, died on August 21, 1971. A 1952 newspaper featured an ad for Simonton's plumbing services. In 1959, Simonton lost an election for Constable.

In 1978, the television series Project U.F.O. based an episode on Simonton's story, with aliens offering a strange loaf of bread in exchange for a jug of water.

In 2023, it was reported that a fragment of one of the pancakes is still in the possession of the National Museum of the United States Air Force.

== Modern interpretations ==
In 2019, author and University of Wisconsin English Professor B. J. Hollars published his experience with the case, having travelled to Eagle River to interview locals. According to Hollars, modern interpretations suggest Simonton hallucinated or dreamt the unusual object and its occupants, perhaps while cooking the pancakes himself. An alternative suggestion holds the story might been fabricated in order to discredit Judge Frank Carter, though UFO author Jerome Clark questions what motive Simonton would have had to do so.

In 2020, Reason's Jesse Walker observed: "The UFO literature is also filled with another sort of enigma—stories told by people who might be pranking us or might sincerely believe what they're saying. In 1961, a plumber named Joe Simonton told the world that a saucer had flown to his home in rural Wisconsin; a man allegedly exited the spacecraft, asked for some water, and then gave Simonton some pancakes. I'll go out on a limb and say that I doubt this really happened. But I'll be damned if I could tell you whether Simonton thought it happened."

== See also ==
- UFO Cover Up? Live - 1988 hoax in which Richard C. Doty claimed a gray alien enjoyed eating strawberry ice-cream
- "Breakfast Can Wait" - 2013 single with art inspired by an anecdote of the musician Prince serving pancakes in an absurd "juxtaposition of the banal and exotic".
