= Ruins of the Reich =

- Directed by: R. J. Adams
- Written by: R. J. Adams
- Produced by: Diane C. Adams
- Distributed by: History Quest Video
- Release date: April 2, 2007 (U.S.)
- Running time: 236 minutes
- Country: United States
- Language: English language

Ruins of the Reich is a documentary series that traces the rise and fall of the Third Reich through its architecture. Written and directed by film maker R. J. Adams, the film's "then and now" format focuses on the primary sites that played key roles from Hitler's rise to his final days in his Berlin bunker.

== Synopsis ==
The four-part series with its "then and now" format blends first generation archival film with current HD footage of the buildings, monuments and bunkers as they were during the Third Reich and as they appear today.

== Historical sites ==
Part 1 - Munich's Feldherrnhalle, scene of the failed Beer Hall Putsch, the Hotel Hanslbauer, site of the "Night of the Long Knives", Paul von Hindenburg's Neudeck estate, the Tannenberg Memorial, the Obersalzberg retreat including Hitler's Berghof, the small Teehaus on the Mooslahnerkopf, the Platterhof Hotel, Martin Bormann's guest house, the Gutsof, Hermann Göring's Alpine chalet, Albert Speer's architectural design studio, the SS Barracks and Kehlsteinhaus, more commonly known as the Eagle's Nest.

Part 2 - Nazi party rally grounds, Albert Speer's Zeppelinfield grandstands, Congress Hall, Hitler Youth Stadium, war memorial on the Luitpold Field, Hitler's Munich headquarters, site of the Munich Agreement as well as the assassination site of Reinhard Heydrich and his grave at Invaliden cemetery, Berlin.

Part 3 - Warsaw Ghetto, Gestapo headquarters, Pawiak Prison, Palmiry massacre site, Oskar Schindler's Deutsche Emalia Fabrika, Kraków-Płaszów concentration camp, Auschwitz-Birkenau, Treblinka, Fermont, Immerhof and Hackenberg on the Maginot Line, Compiègne, tomb of Napoleon and the German submarine pens and Cross-Channel guns in Normandy and the Pas-de-Calais.

Part 4 - the five D-Day landing beaches, Erwin Rommel's western front headquarters, Wolfsschlucht II, the Wolf's Lair, Malmedy, Bastogne, Remagen bridge, Ordensburg Vogelsang, Bendlerblock, Plötzensee Prison, Gestapo headquarters, Berlin and inside the Reich Chancellery Bunker as it appears today.

== Filming ==
Production of the Ruins series began in Berlin, Munich and Berchtesgaden in May 1993. Two years later filming resumed in northern Germany, the Atlantic coast and France. In August 1999 the crew discovered several lost sites in Poland such as the ruins of the Tannenberg Memorial and Hindenburg's Neudeck estate as well as several well-known locations like Ordensburg Marienberg (Malbork Castle). The following year the crew was granted unprecedented access to both Auschwitz and Birkenau, where cameras captured the entire complex inside and out. Filming also included the Kraków-Płaszów concentration camp, Treblinka and Majdanek extermination camps. Shooting wrapped in the fall of 2002 in France, Belgium, the Czech Republic, and Germany.

== See also ==
- Nazi architecture
