= Sierra Repertory Theatre =

Cultural institution in California

Sierra Repertory Theatre is a regional theatre company producing dramas, musicals and comedies located in Sonora, California, United States. Founded in 1980 by David and Kathryn Kahn, Doug Brennan, and Sara and Dennis Jones who met as university students at the Fallon House Theatre in Columbia while doing summer stock performances with the University of the Pacific drama program.

They first converted a tin beer distribution warehouse into a rustic 99-seat theater in East Sonora where their first performance was an adaptation of Dracula in February 1980. They operated in this venue for over a decade until expanding the space in the mid-1990s to a 202-seat theater with raked seats providing an intimate setting.

In 1997 the company was selected as the resident theater company at the Historic Fallon House Theatre in Columbia State Historic Park. For the founders this selection was significant as a homecoming and the company's first production was Something's Afoot, which opened in October of that year. Since then, Sierra Rep has produced more than 1,400 performances at the Fallon House and reached an audience of more than 240,000 patrons. The theatre company celebrated its 25th anniversary in 2004 with a staging of the Andrew Lloyd Webber musical Cats on its small stage.

Founder Doug Brennan is the stage manager for the Fallon House venue. Producing Artistic Director Scott Viets directs and choreographs the majority of the company's musicals, as well as select dramas. He and Managing Director Becky Saunders took over those roles from founders Dennis and Sara Jones in August, 2017.

Sierra Repertory annually produces 8 shows at the two venues and plays to an audience of more than 65,000 people per year. It is also actively involved in the community by hosting fundraisers and producing performances for local schools.

In November 2013, the theatre company announced a new youth program that launched with the December performance of actor and new Education Director Ralph Krumins' children's musical Jason and the Argonauts.

In March 2014, the company launched its 35th season with "Les Miserables" and welcomed its 1,000,000 patron.
