= Omar Malavé =

Venezuelan baseball player and coach (1963–2021)

- Born: 17 January 1963; Cumaná, Venezuela
- Died: 22 November 2021 (aged 58); Dunedin, Florida, United States
- Batted: Right Threw: Right
- Stats at Baseball Reference

Omar Antonio Malavé (17 January 1963 – 22 November 2021) was a Venezuelan professional baseball player, coach and manager. The first base coach for the Toronto Blue Jays of Major League Baseball in 2010, Malavé spent the 2013 season as the coordinator of Latin American operations in Toronto's player development system. At the time of his death, Malavé was the manager of Mexican League team Algodoneros de Unión Laguna.

== Career ==
Malavé played in the minor leagues for the Blue Jays from 1981 to 1989. A versatile performer, he played every infield position as well as outfield, and hit .258 in 654 games played.

Malavé managed in the Blue Jays' minor league system from 1991–2009 and in 2011–2012.

On 13 January 2014, Malavé was named the manager of the Dunedin Blue Jays.

In January 2020, Malavé joined Algodoneros de Unión Laguna as the team's manager, replacing Jonathan Aceves.

== Death ==
Malavé died on November 22, 2021, in Dunedin, Florida.

Preceded by Garth Iorg	Knoxville Smokies manager 1996–1999	Succeeded by Rocket Wheeler
Preceded by Mel Queen	Syracuse SkyChiefs manager 2000–2003	Succeeded by Marty Pevey
Preceded by Dwayne Murphy	Toronto Blue Jays first base coach 2010	Succeeded by Torey Lovullo
