= Lonnie Zamora incident =

Alleged UFO sighting in 1964

Coordinates: 34°02′33″N 106°53′52″W

Location of Socorro in the Middle Rio Grande Basin, New Mexico

The Lonnie Zamora incident was an alleged UFO sighting that occurred on April 24, 1964 near Socorro, New Mexico, when Socorro police officer Lonnie Zamora claimed that he saw two people dressed in white beside a shiny egg shaped object that later rose into the air accompanied by a roaring blue and orange flame. Zamora's claims were subject to attention from news media and UFO investigators and organizations, and the U.S. Air Force's Project Blue Book listed the case as "unknown". Conventional explanations of Zamora's claims include a lunar lander test by White Sands Missile Range and a hoax by New Mexico Tech students.

== Incident ==
On April 24, 1964 at approximately 17:45, Socorro Police radio dispatcher Nep Lopez received a radio call from Sergeant Lonnie Zamora reporting a possible motor vehicle accident. Zamora advised Lopez that he would be “checking the car down in the arroyo". Shortly after, Lopez received another radio call from Zamora asking Lopez to look through his window to see if he could see an object. When Lopez asked Zamora to describe it, Zamora said "it looks like a balloon” and requested New Mexico State Police Sergeant Chavez meet him at his location. When Chavez arrived, he asked Zamora what the trouble was. Zamora led him to examine some burning brush. When other police officers arrived, they noted patches of smoldering grass and brush. There were also shallow holes in the ground, which Zamora said was from the object landing.

== Zamora's claims ==
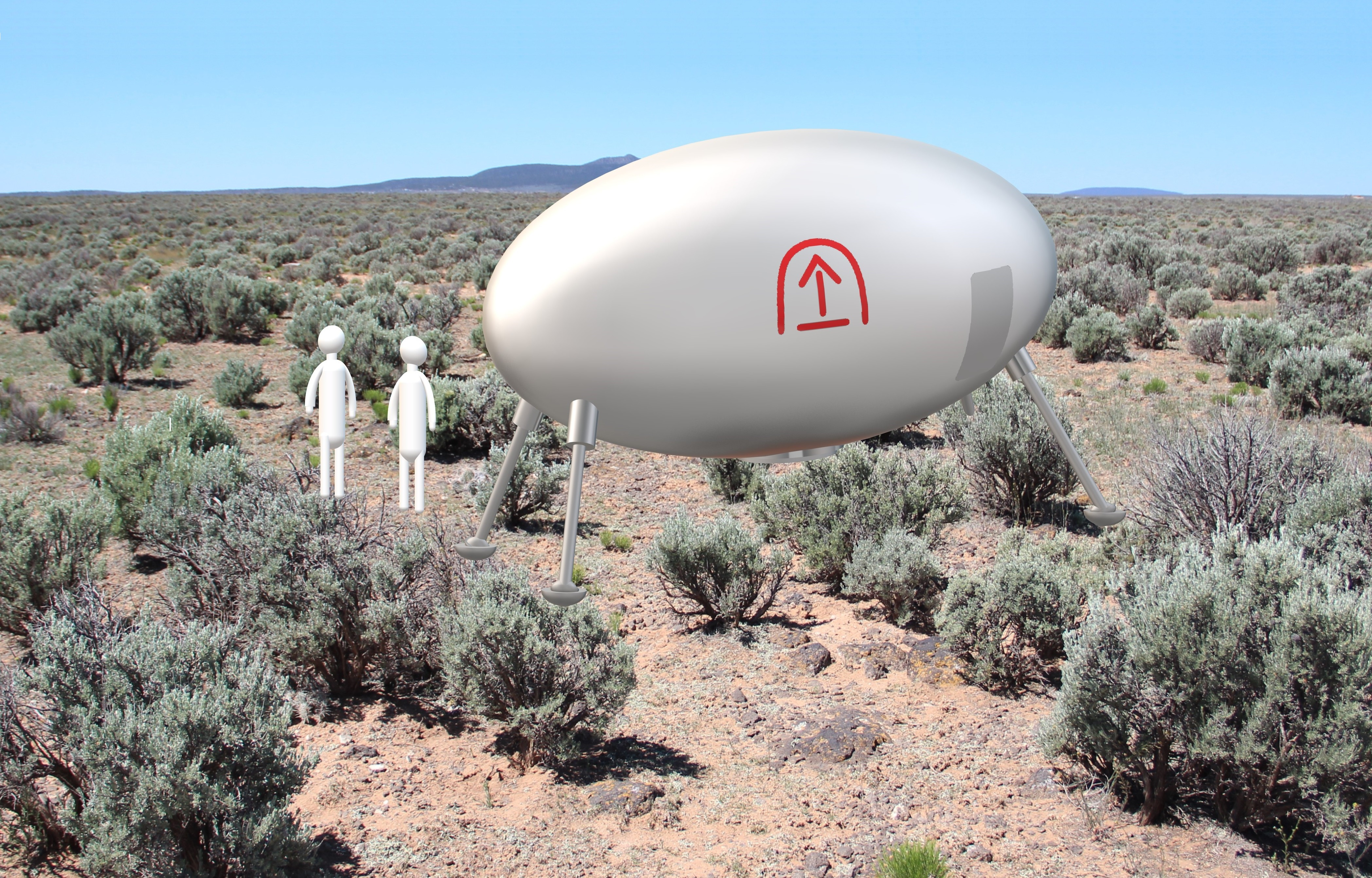
Artist's impression of UFO based on claims by Zamora.

Zamora told authorities he was pursuing a speeding car south of Socorro, New Mexico, when he "heard a roar and saw a flame in the sky to southwest some distance away", which he approximated as being between a half mile to a mile away (0.80–1.61 km). Believing a local dynamite shack might have exploded, Zamora said he discontinued the pursuit and investigated the potential explosion. Zamora claimed to have observed a shiny object, "to south about 150 to 200 yards (450 to 600 ft; 140 to 180 m)", that he initially believed to be an "overturned white car ... up on radiator or on trunk". The object was "like aluminum—it was whitish against the mesa background, but not chrome", and shaped like the letter "O". Zamora claimed to have briefly observed two people in white overalls beside the object, whom he later described as "normal in shape—but possibly they were small adults or large kids." Zamora claimed to hear a roar and see a blue and orange flame under the object, which then rose and quickly moved away.

== Investigations and explanations ==
Zamora's claims were investigated by Project Blue Book and ufologists, and have been reported in the popular press. Several explanations have been presented. UFO skeptic Steuart Campbell has suggested that everything seen and heard by Zamora and fellow witnesses was "almost certainly" a mirage of the star Canopus. It has also been suggested Zamora witnessed the testing of a lunar landing device by personnel from the White Sands Missile Range.

Skeptic Robert Sheaffer suggested that the incident was a hoax perpetrated by students at New Mexico Tech. Then-president of New Mexico Tech Stirling Colgate supported this theory, and wrote that the object observed by Zamora was: "A candle in a balloon. Not sophisticated."

Skeptic Philip J. Klass, who visited Socorro several years after the incident, claimed that the entire event was part of a plan by the municipal government to increase tourism.

== Aftermath ==
In 1966, the president of the Socorro County's Chamber of Commerce, Paul Ridings, proposed developing the site of Zamora’s claimed UFO encounter to make it more accessible to tourists. Consequently, stone walkways and steps were built into the arroyo from the mesa top, with a rock walkway circling the supposed landing site that included some wooden benches. However these were built approximately a quarter mile (0.40 km) from the actual site of Zamora’s alleged sighting, due to local rumors that the original site was contaminated by radioactivity. In 2012, Socorro city officials Ravi Bhasker and Pat Salome commissioned local artist Erika Burleigh to paint a mural on a spillway facing Park Street to commemorate Zamora's alleged UFO sighting. Zamora died on November 2, 2009, in Socorro; he was 76 years old.

== See also ==
- Eagle River encounter, where men in an unidentified aircraft allegedly landed, taking water and giving pancakes
- List of reported UFO sightings in the United States
- List of UFO sightings
