= The Final Journey =

- Directed by: R. J. Adams
- Written by: R. J. Adams, Paul Kirby, Diane Adams
- Produced by: Diane C. Adams
- Distributed by: History Quests
- Release date: September 20, 2010
- Running time: 128 minutes
- Country: United States
- Language: English

The Final Journey is a 2010 documentary that chronicles the largest of the Nazi concentration camps that were scattered throughout Germany during the Third Reich. Created and directed by the film maker R. J. Adams and narrated by Paul Kirby, the program focuses entirely on who played key roles and how in their contribution to the tragedy of the Holocaust.

== Synopsis ==
The two-hour-long film utilizes a then and now format that blends first-generation archival film with current high definition footage of each of the former Nazi camps as they are today and the how they appeared during the Third Reich.

== Historical sites ==
Several extermination camps are shown in the film: Dachau, Sachsenhausen, Buchenwald, Flossenbürg, Mauthausen, Ravensbrück, Stutthof and Bergen Belsen.

== Filming ==
Production of The Final Journey began in 1998 and remains as a work in progress with part two, the Extermination camp, set for release in 2012. These sites known as Vernichtungslager functioned primarily as places of genocide as the answer for the Nazi question of the Jewish problem. Film crews for both part 1 and 2 of The Final Journey covered every aspect of each major camp located in Germany and the former occupied territories of the Third Reich.

== See also ==
- Schutzstaffel
- Heinrich Himmler
- The Final Solution
