= Charles E. Conrad =

American acting coach (1925–2009)

- Born: Charles Erich Conrad; May 23, 1925; New York City, United States
- Died: October 29, 2009 (aged 84); Port Townsend, Washington, United States
- Occupation: Acting coach

Charles Erich Conrad (May 23, 1925 – October 29, 2009) was an American acting coach.

Born in New York City, the only child of German immigrants, Charles Conrad spent his early years growing up in New York City. At the age of 17, he joined the Navy where he served as an armed guard on Merchant ships during World War II. He subsequently studied theater directing at the Carnegie Institute of Technology (now part of Carnegie Mellon University). In 1952, he began studying the craft of acting with Sanford Meisner at the Neighborhood Playhouse.

He subsequently moved to California, where he opened his own studio (CEC Studio) in Burbank. He taught using his own refinements of the Meisner Technique.

Among the actors he coached were Helen Hunt, Jack Nicholson, Susan Sarandon, Kim Basinger, Dennis Quaid, Michelle Pfeiffer, Diana Ross, and Robert Duvall.

He died, aged 84, from kidney failure on October 29, 2009.

== Sources ==
- Judy Kerr. "Acting Is Everything: An Actor's Guidebook for a Successful Career in Los Angeles" (11th ed; 2006). September Publishing; ISBN 0-9629496-6-3
