= Rancho Trabuco =

Coordinates: 33.620°N 117.620°W

Rancho Trabuco was a 22,184-acre (89.78 km^{2}) Mexican land grant in present-day Orange County, California. The five square league grants consisted of two square leagues in 1841 by Governor Juan B. Alvarado to Santiago Argüello, and three square leagues in 1846 by Governor Pío Pico to John (Don Juan) Forster. The name "trabuco" means "blunderbuss" in Spanish. The grant extended along Trabuco Creek and Trabuco Canyon, encompassing present-day Coto de Caza. Rancho Cañada de los Alisos bordered the grant on the west and Rancho Mission Viejo on the east.

== History ==
Santiago Argüello was a soldier in the Mexican army and commandant at the Presidio of San Diego from 1830 to 1835. In 1841, Argüello was granted the two-square-league Rancho Trabuco for his services. In 1846, Argüello was granted Rancho Ex-Mission San Diego. John Forster, the adjacent Rancho Mission Viejo grantee in 1845, acquired Argüello's Rancho Trabuco and was granted an additional three square leagues in 1846..

With the cession of California to the United States following the Mexican-American War, the 1848 Treaty of Guadalupe Hidalgo provided that the land grants would be honored. As the Land Act of 1851 required, a claim for Rancho Trabuco was filed with the Public Land Commission in 1852, and the grant was patented to John Forster in 1866.

In 1864, Forster added Rancho Santa Margarita y Las Flores to his holdings. Forster died in 1882.

Irish immigrants, Richard O'Neill Sr. and James Flood, acquired the rancho in 1882. Flood and O'Neill became equal partners of the Rancho Santa Margarita y las Flores, Rancho Mission Viejo, and Rancho Trabuco lands. In 1907, James L. Flood, son of the original owner, made good on his late father's promise and conveyed an undivided half interest to O'Neill, Sr. Four months later, declining health caused O'Neill to deed his interest to his son, Jerome. In 1923, the sons of Flood and O'Neill consolidated their partnership with the Santa Margarita Company. In 1939, property was divided. Richard O'Neill Jr. retained the Rancho Mission Viejo and Rancho Trabuco portion located in Orange County, and the Flood family took the Rancho Santa Margarita y las Flores property in San Diego County. Most of Rancho Trabuco is now the site of O'Neill Regional Park
