= Las Flores, California =

Census-designated place in California, United States

- Unincorporated community Census-designated place
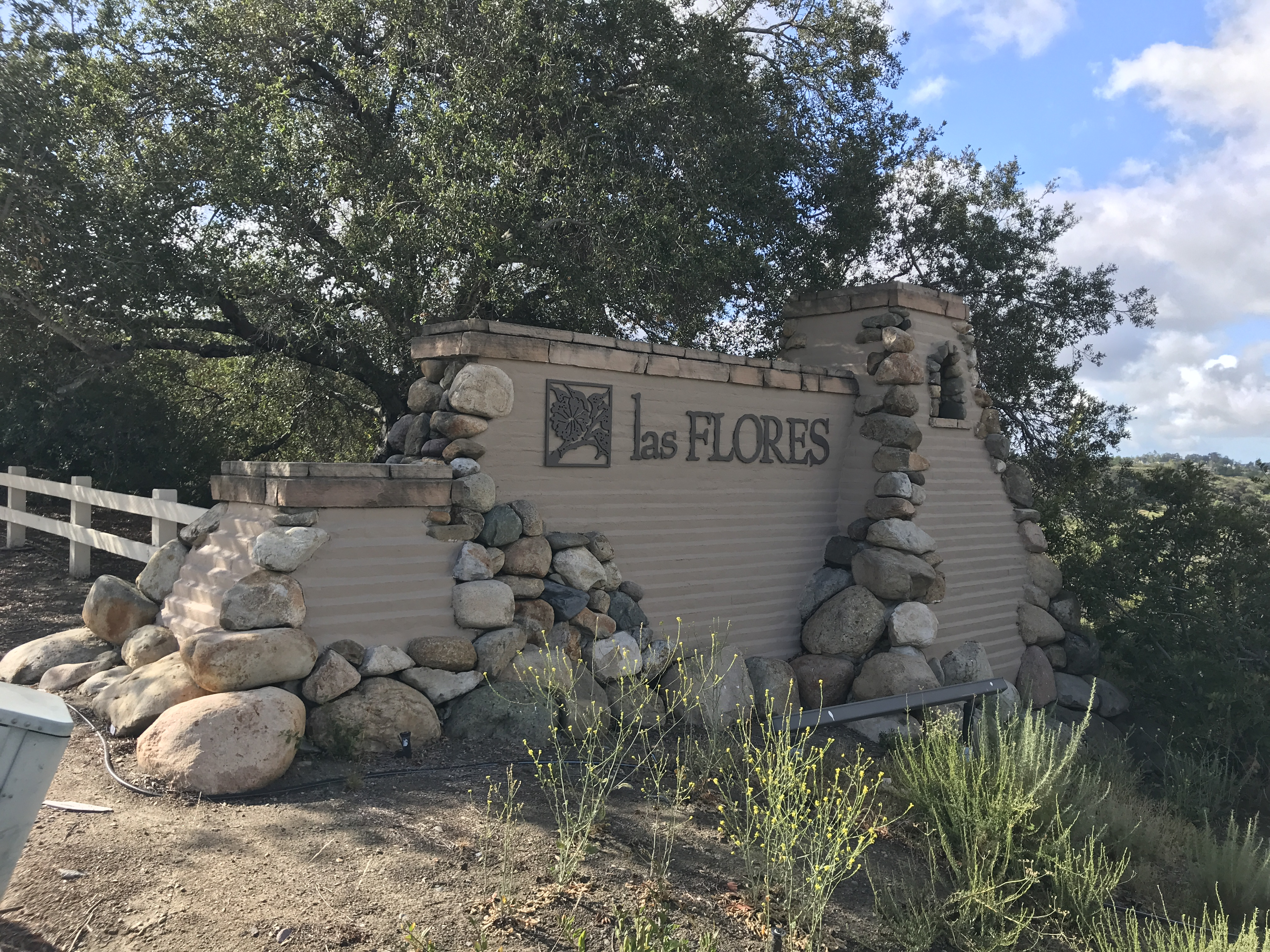
- Entrance sign for Las Flores along Oso Parkway

- Location of Las Flores in Orange County, California
- Coordinates: 33°35′13″N 117°37′39″W
- Country: United States
- State: California
- County: Orange

Area
  - Total: 2.551 sq mi (6.606 km^{2})
  - Land: 2.551 sq mi (6.606 km^{2})
  - Water: 0 sq mi (0 km^{2}) 0%
- Elevation: 715 ft (218 m)

Population (April 1, 2020)
  - Total: 5,995
  - Density: 2,350/sq mi (907.5/km^{2})
- Time zone: UTC−08:00 (Pacific)
  - Summer (DST): UTC−07:00 (PDT)
- ZIP Code: 92688
- Area code: 949
- FIPS code: 06-40526
- GNIS feature IDs: 1853398, 2408577

Las Flores (Spanish for "The Flowers") is an unincorporated community and census-designated place (CDP) in Orange County, California, United States, located adjacent to the City of Rancho Santa Margarita, California. The population was 5,995 at the 2020 census, up from 5,971 at the 2010 census. Las Flores does not have its own ZIP Code and is served by the same ZIP Code as adjacent Rancho Santa Margarita, 92688.

The Rancho Santa Margarita dog/skate park is located in the CDP and is served by the Orange County Sheriff's Dept. and Orange County Fire Authority. Although Las Flores lies in the land grant of Rancho Mission Viejo, it is named after the land grant about twenty-five miles (40 km) south, Rancho Santa Margarita y Las Flores.

== Geography ==
Las Flores is located near the intersection of Oso Parkway and Antonio Parkway in unincorporated southern Orange County, running several miles adjacent to Antonio Parkway and Oso Parkway. Las Flores is bordered by the city of Rancho Santa Margarita to the northwest, the census-designated place (CDP) Coto de Caza to the north, the CDP Ladera Ranch to the south, and the city of Mission Viejo to the west.

According to the United States Census Bureau, the CDP has a total area of 2.6 square miles (6.7 km^{2}), all land.

== Demographics ==
Historical population
Census	Pop.	Note	%±
2000	5,625		—
2010	5,971		6.2%
2020	5,995		0.4%
U.S. Decennial Census; 1860–1870 1880-1890; 1900 1910 1920; 1930 1940 1950; 1960 1970 1980; 1990 2000 2010; 2020

Las Flores first appeared as a census designated place in the 2000 U.S. census.

Las Flores CDP, California – Racial and ethnic composition Note: the US Census treats Hispanic/Latino as an ethnic category. This table excludes Latinos from the racial categories and assigns them to a separate category. Hispanics/Latinos may be of any race.
Race / Ethnicity (NH = Non-Hispanic)	Pop 2000	Pop 2010	Pop 2020	% 2000	% 2010	% 2020
White alone (NH)	4,040	3,857	3,499	71.82%	64.60%	58.37%
Black or African American alone (NH)	105	89	80	1.87%	1.49%	1.33%
Native American or Alaska Native alone (NH)	22	14	9	0.39%	0.23%	0.15%
Asian alone (NH)	571	766	948	10.15%	12.83%	15.81%
Native Hawaiian or Pacific Islander alone (NH)	5	12	10	0.09%	0.20%	0.17%
Other race alone (NH)	10	17	38	0.18%	0.28%	0.63%
Mixed race or Multiracial (NH)	204	232	350	3.63%	3.89%	5.84%
Hispanic or Latino (any race)	668	984	1,061	11.88%	16.48%	17.70%
Total	5,625	5,971	5,995	100.00%	100.00%	100.00%

=== 2020 ===
The 2020 United States census reported that Las Flores had a population of 5,995. The population density was 2,350.1 inhabitants per square mile (907.4/km^{2}). The racial makeup of Las Flores was 62.7% White, 1.4% African American, 0.6% Native American, 16.0% Asian, 0.2% Pacific Islander, 5.6% from other races, and 13.5% from two or more races. Hispanic or Latino of any race were 17.7% of the population.

The whole population lived in households. There were 1,948 households, out of which 46.4% included children under the age of 18, 66.6% were married-couple households, 4.3% were cohabiting couple households, 18.5% had a female householder with no partner present, and 10.5% had a male householder with no partner present. 13.5% of households were one person, and 3.5% were one person aged 65 or older. The average household size was 3.08. There were 1,583 families (81.3% of all households).

The age distribution was 26.8% under the age of 18, 10.5% aged 18 to 24, 25.2% aged 25 to 44, 30.9% aged 45 to 64, and 6.5% who were 65 years of age or older. The median age was 35.7 years. For every 100 females, there were 98.2 males.

There were 1,981 housing units at an average density of 776.6 units per square mile (299.8 units/km^{2}), of which 1,948 (98.3%) were occupied. Of these, 66.7% were owner-occupied, and 33.3% were occupied by renters.

In 2023, the US Census Bureau estimated that the median household income was $196,250, and the per capita income was $71,202. About 5.4% of families and 5.8% of the population were below the poverty line.

=== 2010 ===
At the 2010 census Las Flores had a population of 5,971. The population density was 2,943.7 inhabitants per square mile (1,136.6/km^{2}). The racial makeup of Las Flores was 4,488 (75.2%) White (64.6% Non-Hispanic White), 91 (1.5%) African American, 23 (0.4%) Native American, 780 (13.1%) Asian, 12 (0.2%) Pacific Islander, 261 (4.4%) from other races, and 316 (5.3%) from two or more races. Hispanic or Latino of any race were 984 people (16.5%).

The whole population lived in households, no one lived in non-institutionalized group quarters and no one was institutionalized.

There were 1,916 households, 1,079 (56.3%) had children under the age of 18 living in them, 1,279 (66.8%) were opposite-sex married couples living together, 198 (10.3%) had a female householder with no husband present, 76 (4.0%) had a male householder with no wife present. There were 84 (4.4%) unmarried opposite-sex partnerships, and 12 (0.6%) same-sex married couples or partnerships. 257 households (13.4%) were one person and 27 (1.4%) had someone living alone who was 65 or older. The average household size was 3.12. There were 1,553 families (81.1% of households); the average family size was 3.47.

The age distribution was 2,029 people (34.0%) under the age of 18, 418 people (7.0%) aged 18 to 24, 1,885 people (31.6%) aged 25 to 44, 1,416 people (23.7%) aged 45 to 64, and 223 people (3.7%) who were 65 or older. The median age was 33.2 years. For every 100 females, there were 99.4 males. For every 100 females age 18 and over, there were 93.0 males.

There were 1,969 housing units at an average density of 970.7 per square mile, of the occupied units 1,326 (69.2%) were owner-occupied and 590 (30.8%) were rented. The homeowner vacancy rate was 0.7%; the rental vacancy rate was 5.6%. 4,469 people (74.8% of the population) lived in owner-occupied housing units and 1,502 people (25.2%) lived in rental housing units.

According to the 2010 United States Census, Las Flores had a median household income of $128,301, with 3.6% of the population living below the federal poverty line.

Served by Rancho Santa Margarita's zip code 92688. It is named in reference to Rancho Santa Margarita y Las Flores. It was established when Rancho Santa Margarita was unincorporated in the 1990s and was never officially annexed when RSM incorporated in 2000.

== Government ==
In the California State Legislature, Las Flores is in the 38th senatorial district, represented by Democrat Catherine Blakespear, and in the 71st Assembly district, represented by Republican Kate Sanchez.

In the United States House of Representatives, Las Flores is in California's 49th congressional district, represented by Democrat Mike Levin.

== Education ==
The CDP is served by Capistrano Unified School District.

Las Flores is the home to the adjoined campuses of Las Flores Elementary and Las Flores Middle School, as well as Tesoro High School.
