= Erik Hamren (baseball) =

American baseball player (born 1986)

- Pitcher
- Born: August 21, 1986 (age 39); Coto de Caza, California, U.S.
- Batted: Right Threw: Right

MLB debut
- August 1, 2011, for the San Diego Padres

Last MLB appearance
- September 25, 2011, for the San Diego Padres

MLB statistics
- Win–loss record: 1–0
- Earned run average: 4.38
- Strikeouts: 10
- Stats at Baseball Reference

Teams
- San Diego Padres (2011)

Erik Kendall Hamren (born August 21, 1986) is an American former professional baseball pitcher. He played in Major League Baseball (MLB) for the San Diego Padres.

== Baseball career ==
=== Amateur career ===
Hamren went to Tesoro High School as an outfielder and batted .452 his senior year. He lettered in both baseball and football. He was not pursued by any team out of high school, and went to college at University of the Pacific in Stockton, California, to play for head coach Ed Sprague Jr., a former MLB player. He played in only six games his freshman year, 2006, as an outfielder for the Tigers. In 2007, Hamren also made 10 pitching appearances for Pacific, posting a 13.94 ERA in 10 1/3 innings with seven strikeouts. He transferred to Saddleback College for the 2008 season and was drafted by the Chicago Cubs in the 37th round, 1121st overall, of the 2008 Major League Baseball draft.

=== Professional career ===
Hamren was drafted as a pitcher and was assigned to the rookie level Arizona League Cubs, where he went 1-1 with a 5.87 ERA almost exclusively as a reliever. He was promoted to the Boise Hawks. He started 2009 with the Single-A Peoria Chiefs, and finished with a 5.98 ERA over 38 appearances. He was released by the Cubs in the offseason. Hamren spent 2010 in the independent Northern League, in what proved to be the league's last season. He split time with the Kansas City T-Bones and Joliet JackHammers. Hamren had a 3.39 ERA in the league before being signed in the offseason by the San Diego Padres. He started with the High-A Lake Elsinore Storm, and went 2-0 with a 1.08 ERA before earning a promotion to the Double-A San Antonio Missions, where he went 3-0 with a 0.92 ERA and was a Texas League All-Star.

On July 31, 2011, Hamren was promoted to the major leagues to replace Mike Adams, who was traded to the Texas Rangers.

On March 27, 2013, Hamren was released by the Padres.

In April 2013, Hamren signed with the Atlanta Braves on a minor league contract, he was assigned to Double-A. On June 2, he was traded to the Tampa Bay Rays in exchange for future considerations.

In 2014, Hamren played for the Southern Maryland Blue Crabs. On July 11, 2014, the Texas Rangers signed Hamren to a minor league contract.
