= Juan Forster =

English-born Californio ranchero and merchant (1814–1882)

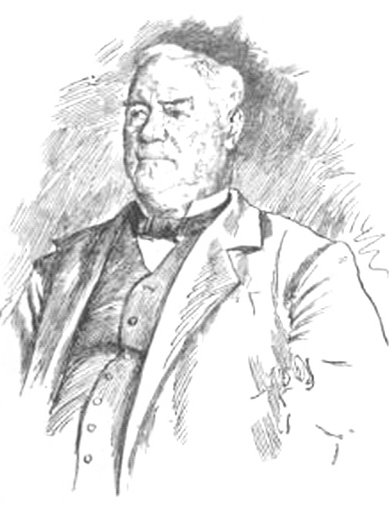
- Don Juan Forster
- Born: 1814; Liverpool, England
- Died: February 20, 1882 (aged 67–68); Rancho Santa Margarita, California
- Spouse: Ysidora Pico

Don Juan Forster (born John; 1814 – February 20, 1882) was an English-born Californio ranchero and merchant. Born in England, he emigrated to Mexico at age 16 and became a Mexican citizen. Soon after, he moved to California (then a province of Mexico), where he married into the prominent Pico family of California and eventually held vast rancho grants across Southern California.

== Early life ==
In 1830, John Forster left his home in Liverpool, England to work for his uncle, James (Santiago) Johnson, in Guaymas, Mexico.

== Arrival in California ==
Forster then came overland to California, reaching Los Angeles in 1833. In 1836 he became a Mexican citizen and worked as a shipping agent at San Pedro. In 1837 he married Ysidora Pico, sister of a future Mexican governor of California, Pio Pico. The Mexican government appointed him captain of the port of San Pedro in March 1843.

== Land grants ==
Forster began acquiring land in the 1840s as a result of his connection with Governor Pico, who granted him Rancho Trabuco, Rancho Mission Viejo, and Rancho Potreros de San Juan Capistrano in what is now Orange County, and Rancho de la Nación in what is now San Diego County. He also owned Rancho Valle de San Felipe in San Diego County.

In 1844 Forster and James McKinley purchased the 44 acres (0.2 km^{2}) and the buildings of the former Mission San Juan Capistrano at public auction for $710.00. Forster made his home here until 1864 when the Mission was given back to the Catholic Church by President Abraham Lincoln.

== Mexican–American War ==
In the Mexican–American War, Forster, though an Englishman and brother-in-law of both the Californio governor (Pio Pico) and the commander of the insurgents (Andrés Pico), determined that the pragmatic thing to do was to offer assistance to the Americans.

In 1846, José Antonio Pico (Forster's oldest brother-in-law) and José Antonio Cot acquired the Mission of San Luis Rey. Forster traveled from San Juan Capistrano to take formal title of the property for the new owners. As Forster took occupancy, Frémont and his American force rode into view. Forster fled back to San Juan Capistrano, leaving the property in the hands of the alcalde, Juan María Marrón. Frémont would have been less favorably disposed had he anticipated that four days later Forster would begin to plan the escape to Mexico of another brother-in-law, Governor Pio Pico. For several weeks, Forster hid Pico in the mountains near San Juan Capistrano; then, at an opportune time, Forster outfitted Pico for a dash to the border on September 7, 1846. Governor Pico fled to Mexico, leaving Forster in charge of Pico's Rancho Santa Margarita y Las Flores.

== American rule ==
The California Gold Rush created a demand for southern California cattle, and Forster profited by supplying that demand. Steers, previously worth only the value of their hides (about $2), soon brought $50 and more in San Francisco.

Typical of the residents of sparsely populated southern California, Forster opposed statehood but would support territorial status. Forster was selected as one of San Diego County's two delegates to the 1849 convention at Monterey, but on learning that the northern California delegates vastly outnumbered his southern colleagues, he chose not to attend. Northern Californian delegates sought statehood, and in 1850, California secured it.

Forster surrendered possession of Rancho de la Nación, the lands of which embrace all of National City and Chula Vista, in 1856. He had been borrowing sums of from $15,000 to $25,000, at three per cent interest, for a number of years. The ranch passed into the possession of a French resident of San Francisco, F. A. L. Pioche, who also acquired Rancho Valle de San Felipe from Forster.

== Rancho Santa Margarita ==
At the beginning of the 1860s, Forster loaned money to his brother-in-law, Pio Pico, who was in financial trouble. In 1862, to thwart collectors, Andrés Pico conveyed all of his land in California, including a half interest in the family's Rancho Santa Margarita to brother Pio Pico. In 1864, Forster purchased Pio Pico's 133,000-acre (540 km^{2}) Rancho Santa Margarita y Las Flores y San Onofre, which included Andrés’ prior interest. The rancho adjoined Forster's own 79,000-acre (320 km^{2}) Rancho Mision Vieja y Trabuco; Forster thereafter ruled over a vast 212,000-acre (860 km^{2}) empire, the largest single-owner ranch in southern California. Forster moved his family to Santa Margarita y Las Flores in 1864.

== Forster City ==
In the 1860s and 1870s, Forster took the first steps to diversify the productivity and income of the Santa Margarita ranch.

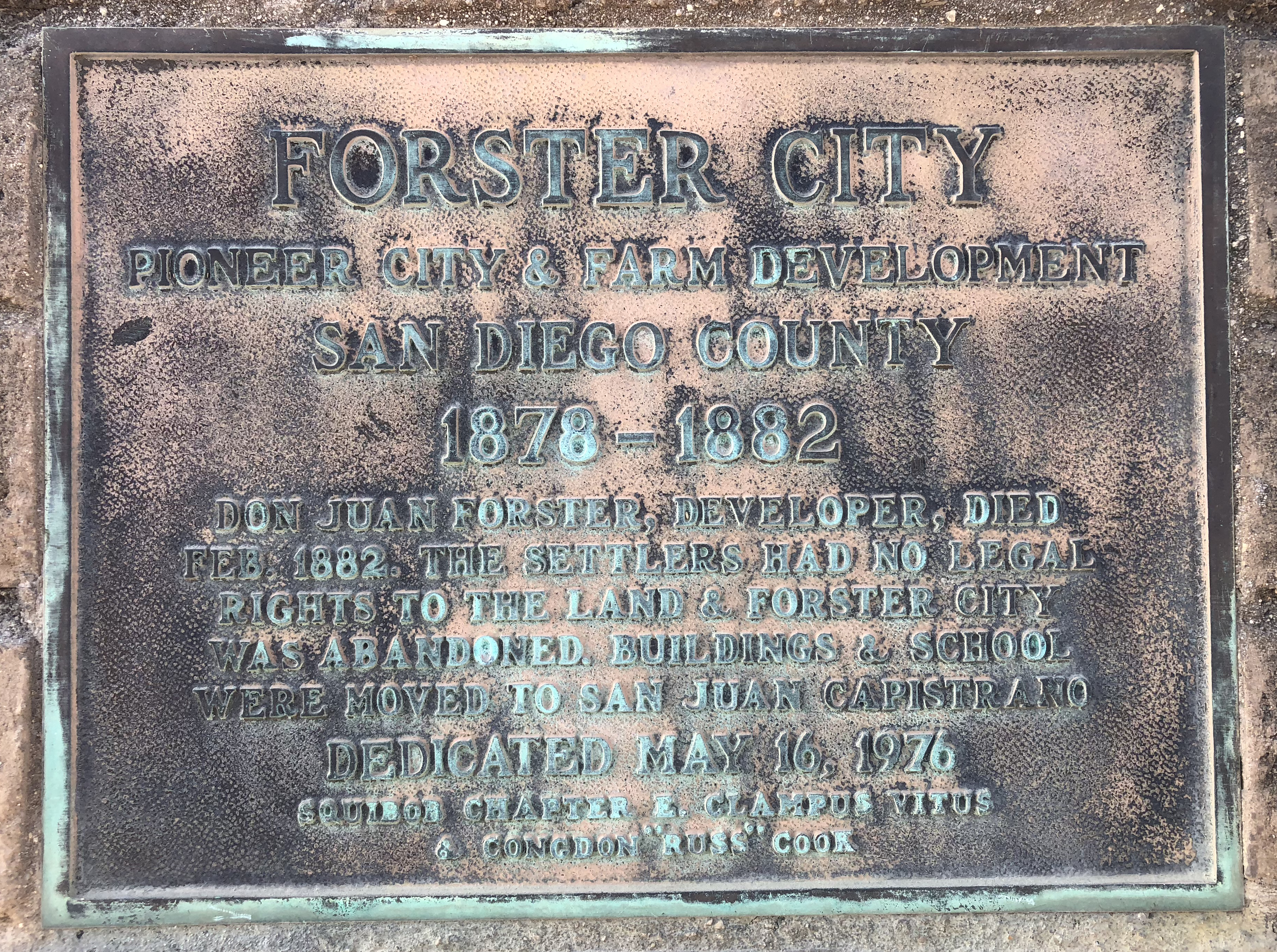
E Clampus Vitus plaque placed at the site of former Forster City

In the early 1870s Forster sent his agent, Max von Strobel, to Europe to advertise the colonization potential of the Rancho Santa Margarita, patterned upon the Anaheim colony. Strobel also sought buyers for Santa Catalina Island, in which Forster owned a share. But Strobel died in London, and in 1873 Forster sailed to England, returning to Liverpool after a 43-year-absence. Forster traveled on to the Netherlands, where he sought to recruit settlers for the ranch by offering household heads 160 acres (0.6 km^{2}) of land, five cows, two horses and sundry supplies, with rent forestalled for the first two or three years. The Dutch government ordered an inspection of Rancho Santa Margarita before it would approve the plan. Forster returned to California in July 1873, unsuccessful in selling Santa Catalina Island but still hopeful for the colonization of the ranch. The inspectors arrived during the heat of August and were unimpressed. Forster's colonization scheme failed. He then tried to establish the town of Forster City on the north coast of his property. Three families settled there by 1876, and some 35 voters were registered in the village in 1882. The town, however, survived for only a few more years.

The potential for railroad development across the Rancho Santa Margarita also captured Forster's imagination. In 1880, the California Southern Railroad, in close cooperation with the Santa Fe, began laying a line from National City to San Bernardino, which would be an eventual link with the Topeka road. North of Oceanside, the tracks turned east and followed the Santa Margarita River across Forster's ranch. Early in 1882, from his home near the river, he could hear the sounds of track being laid, but did not live to see the line's completion.

== Death ==
John Forster died at his Rancho Santa Margarita on February 20, 1882. Fencing 212,000 acres (858 km^{2}) drained his capital, droughts destroyed his cattle, and futile efforts to attract settlers dried up his last remaining credit. His estate was in shambles, and his sons were forced to sell. His family sold the ranch to San Francisco financier James Clair Flood. In 1996, he was inducted into the Hall of Great Westerners of the National Cowboy & Western Heritage Museum.
