= Rancho Mission Viejo, California =

- Unincorporated community Census-designated place
- Antonio Parkway in Rancho Mission Viejo
- Interactive map of Rancho Mission Viejo, California
- Coordinates: 33°31′35″N 117°37′07″W
- Country: United States
- State: California
- County: Orange

Area
  - Total: 37.808 sq mi (97.92 km^{2})
  - Land: 37.808 sq mi (97.92 km^{2})
  - Water: 0 sq mi (0 km^{2})
- Elevation: 453 ft (138 m)

Population (2020)
  - Total: 10,378
- Time zone: UTC-8 (PST)
  - Summer (DST): UTC-7 (PDT)
- ZIP code: 92694
- Area code: 949
- GNIS feature IDs: 2805249 2804915, 2805250, 2805273

Rancho Mission Viejo (Spanish: Rancho Misión Vieja, meaning "Old Mission Ranch") is an active 23,000 acres (9,300 ha) ranch and farm, habitat reserve, residential community, and census-designated place in South Orange County, California, United States. Rancho Mission Viejo is one of the Mexican Ranchos of California, with Rancho Mission Viejo forming from a series of land grants to John Forster in 1845. The remaining part of Rancho Mission Viejo consists of a nearly 17,000-acre (6,900 ha) nature reserve (The Reserve at Rancho Mission Viejo) and multiple residential communities slated to open in phases between 2010 and 2030. As of the 2020 census, it had a population of 10,378.

== History ==
Prior to the founding of the ranch, the land was the site of Acjachemen village of Piwiva. Through the Mission period, the village had transformed into an outlying ranch of Mission San Luis Rey. It had a large population of Acjachemen ranchers under the control of the mission, who were to legally own the town after the secularization of the missions, though this never happened. The ranch was established in 1845 when John (Don Juan) Forster acquired Rancho La Paz and Mission San Juan Capistrano. Forster added these properties to Rancho Trabuco, which he had purchased in 1843. Forster's brother-in-law was Pío Pico, governor of then-Mexican-held California.

With the cession of California to the United States following the Mexican-American War, the 1848 Treaty of Guadalupe Hidalgo provided that the land grants would be honored. As required by the Land Act of 1851, a claim for Rancho Mission Viejo was filed with the Public Land Commission in 1852, and the grant was patented to John (Don Juan) Forster on August 6, 1866, for 46,432.65 acres (18,790.63 ha). In 1864, Forster added Rancho Santa Margarita y Las Flores to his holdings, which then totaled about 200,000 acres (81,000 ha), making him one of the largest landowners in the state.

After Forster died in 1882, Irish immigrants Richard O'Neill Sr. and James Flood acquired the ranch, taking equal ownership of the Rancho Santa Margarita y las Flores, Rancho Mission Viejo and Rancho Trabuco lands. Flood provided the money to purchase the ranches; O'Neill, offering his skills as a cattleman as sweat equity, agreed to work out his half as resident manager. Under O'Neill, the cattle herd was expanded, the land was improved, row crops were introduced, and the ranch became Orange County's largest producer of wheat.

In 1907, James L. Flood, son of the original owner, made good on his late father's promise and conveyed an undivided half interest to O'Neill Sr. Four months later, declining health caused O'Neill to deed his interest to his son, Jerome. In 1923, the sons of Flood and O'Neill consolidated their partnership with the Santa Margarita Company. Shortly thereafter, both men died.

The Santa Margarita Co. was dissolved in 1939 when the ranch was split in two. Richard O'Neill Jr. retained the portion of the ranch located in Orange County (Rancho Mission Viejo and Rancho Trabuco) and the Flood family took the Rancho Santa Margarita y las Flores property in San Diego County. In 1942, the United States Marine Corps acquired the entire San Diego portion of 123,620 acres (500.3 km^{2}) for $4,239,062 to expand Camp Pendleton. After the war, what remained of the historic Ranch now encompassed two Orange County parcels, united under the name Rancho Mission Viejo, and totaling 52,000 acres (210 km^{2}).

O'Neill died in 1943 and his widow, Marguerite, led the family and kept the family business intact. In June 1950, with the establishment of the 278-acre (1.13 km^{2}) O'Neill Regional Park, the O'Neill family made the first of thousands of acres of open space dedications to Orange County.

As of 2017, the Sendero village and the Gavilan senior housing developments have been completed. The larger Esencia village is currently under construction with a K-8 school to be opened in fall of 2018. Sendero Marketplace, a shopping center built as part of the community, has also been completed.

=== Residential development ===
In 1963, the O'Neill family and its partners established the Mission Viejo Company and embarked on its first residential development, the 11,000 acres (45 km^{2}) planned community of Mission Viejo. Marguerite had three grandsons, Anthony Moiso, Jerome Moiso, and Douglas Avery. The oldest, Anthony "Tony" Moiso, newly graduated from college and fresh out of the U.S. Army, took over operations.

In 1972, Mission Viejo Co. and its remaining undeveloped area in Mission Viejo were sold to Philip Morris. The Mission Viejo Company was acquired by Shea Properties in August 1997. After the initial sale, Moiso began managing the remaining 40,000 acres (160 km^{2}) of Rancho Mission Viejo, while his brothers Jerome Moiso and Douglas Avery continued to oversee operations as owners. The three brothers and their uncle, Richard O'Neill, have preserved more than 20,000 acres (81 km^{2}) of open space and moved forward with additional development of the former Rancho. Rancho Mission Viejo is still a working ranch with 600 head of cattle and has more than 500 acres (2.0 km^{2}) of citrus trees, as well as crops of avocados, beans and barley.

Rancho Mission Viejo is today home to four master-planned communities: the City of Mission Viejo, City of Rancho Santa Margarita, Las Flores, and Ladera Ranch. In 2000, the O’Neill/Avery/Moiso family created a comprehensive open space preservation and land use plan for the remaining 23,000 acres of Rancho Mission Viejo. In 2004, the Ranch Plan was approved by the Orange County Board of Supervisors. That plan has resulted in the creation of The Reserve at Rancho Mission Viejo (a nearly 17,000-acre habitat reserve on the Ranch) and the plan for a new community called Rancho Mission Viejo, which celebrated its grand opening in 2013 with the debut of its first community called Sendero. In Fall 2015, the new community of Esencia celebrated the grand opening of its first 12 neighborhoods as well as host of community amenities.

In May 2019, the Reata Glen senior living community opened in Rancho Mission Viejo and received its first residents. It is described in the typology of the architectural specifications as a 55+ independent living/assisted living/memory care/skilled nursing life plan community (CCRC).

== Geography ==
Rancho Mission Viejo is bordered by the city of San Juan Capistrano to the west, the city of San Clemente to the south, and the census-designated Ladera Ranch to the north. To the east is the Cleveland National Forest.

The major thoroughfares through the area include Antonio Parkway/Avenida De Pata (north-south), Los Patrones Parkway (north-south) and California State Route 74 (east-west). In addition, Cow Camp Road provides access to a majority of the new housing developments. Cow Camp Road will eventually connect to Ortega Highway in the east, providing a four-mile route along the area, with new housing developments being built between 2010 and 2030. In addition, the Transportation Corridor Agencies who manage the 241 toll road, voted in 2020 to extend Los Patrones to the border of San Clemente, as part of the alternatives to extending the unfinished 241 toll road.

== Demographics ==
Historical population
Census	Pop.	Note	%±
2020	10,378		—
U.S. Decennial Census; 2020

=== 2020 census ===
As of the 2020 census, Rancho Mission Viejo had a population of 10,378. For statistical purposes, the United States Census Bureau first listed Rancho Mission Viejo as a census-designated place (CDP) in the 2020 census.

The median age was 39.2 years. 24.8% of residents were under the age of 18 and 20.7% of residents were 65 years of age or older. For every 100 females there were 90.9 males, and for every 100 females age 18 and over there were 88.6 males age 18 and over.

93.5% of residents lived in urban areas, while 6.5% lived in rural areas.

There were 4,051 households in Rancho Mission Viejo, of which 35.8% had children under the age of 18 living in them. Of all households, 64.2% were married-couple households, 9.6% were households with a male householder and no spouse or partner present, and 21.7% were households with a female householder and no spouse or partner present. About 20.1% of all households were made up of individuals and 11.2% had someone living alone who was 65 years of age or older.

There were 4,459 housing units, of which 9.2% were vacant. The homeowner vacancy rate was 6.0% and the rental vacancy rate was 11.0%.

Rancho Mission Viejo, California – Racial and ethnic composition Note: the US Census treats Hispanic/Latino as an ethnic category. This table excludes Latinos from the racial categories and assigns them to a separate category. Hispanics/Latinos may be of any race.
Race / Ethnicity (NH = Non-Hispanic)	Pop 2020	% 2020
White alone (NH)	6,879	66.28%
Black or African American alone (NH)	115	1.11%
Native American or Alaska Native alone (NH)	17	0.16%
Asian alone (NH)	1,163	11.21%
Native Hawaiian or Pacific Islander alone (NH)	7	0.07%
Other race alone (NH)	60	0.58%
Mixed race or Multiracial (NH)	602	5.80%
Hispanic or Latino (any race)	1,535	14.79%
Total	10,378	100.00%

== Education ==
Rancho Mission Viejo is served by the Capistrano Unified School District. Students in the area typically attend Esencia School, a new K-8 academy. Students may opt to attend elementary and middle schools in the neighboring Ladera Ranch. For high school, they attend the nearby San Juan Hills High School in San Juan Capistrano or Tesoro High School in Las Flores.
