= Tesoro High School =

Location
- 1 Tesoro Creek Road; Las Flores, California 92688; United States; 33.58109°N 117.6125°W

Information
- Type: Public High School
- Motto: "Wisdom, Strength, Honor"
- Established: 2001
- School district: Capistrano Unified School District
- Principal: Ken Ezratty
- Grades: 9–12
- Enrollment: 2,217 (2022-23)
- Colors: Scarlet, White, Navy blue
- Athletics conference: CIF Southern Section; Coast View Athletic Association
- Nickname: Titans
- Yearbook: Titanium
- Website: https://tesoro.capousd.org
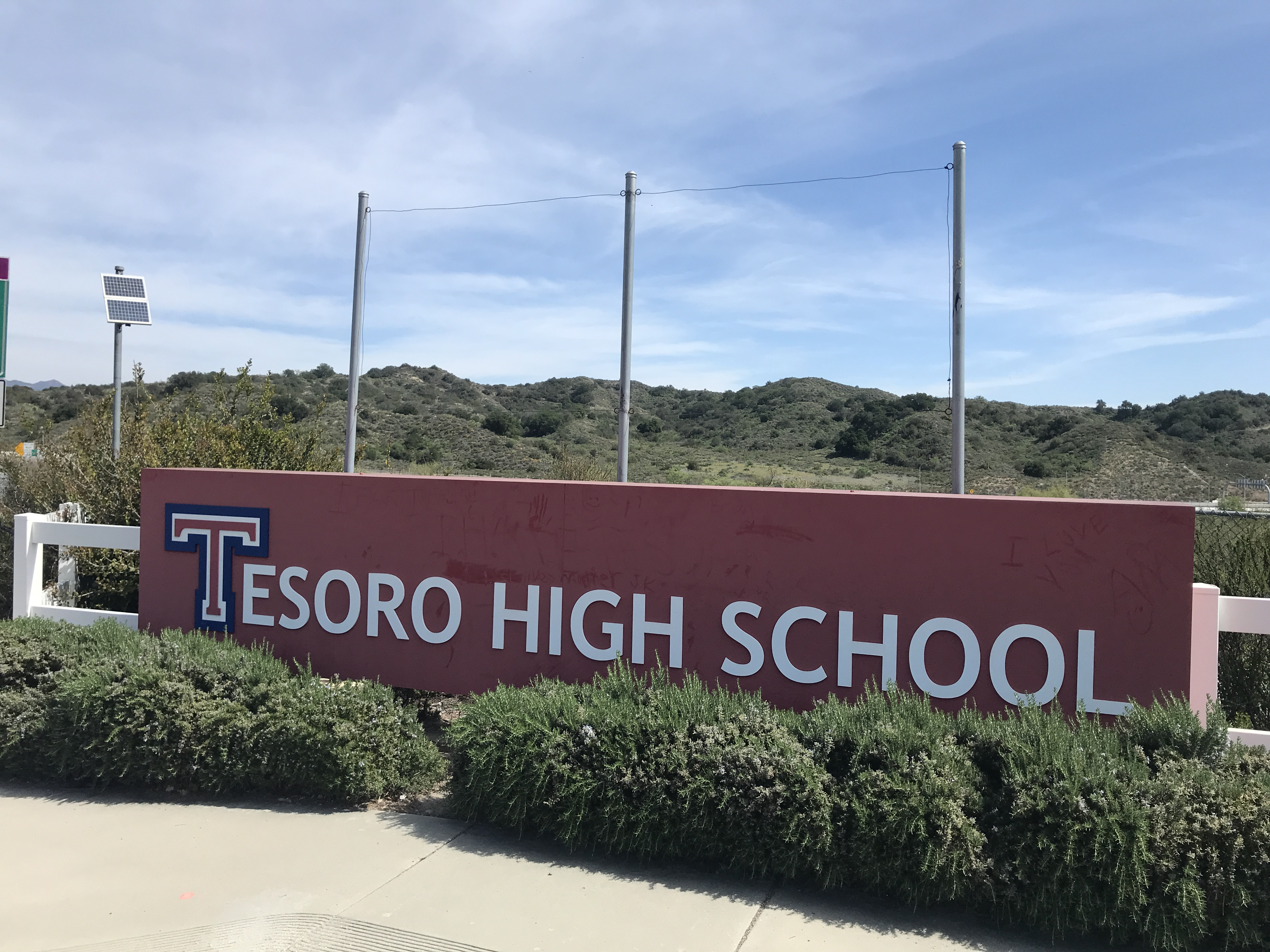

Tesoro High School is a public high school in southern Orange County area of Las Flores, California, United States. Established in the fall of 2001, Tesoro is 1 of 6 regular high schools in the Capistrano Unified School District. As of the 2014–2015 year, Tesoro serves nearly 2500 students in grades 9–12. Students attending Tesoro are within the cities of Rancho Santa Margarita, Las Flores, Ladera Ranch, Coto de Caza and Mission Viejo.

== Achievements ==
Tesoro is a California Distinguished School.

In 2013, Newsweek's "America's Top Public High Schools" feature ranked Tesoro as number 337 out of the 1,300 top high schools nationwide. This makes it, as of 2013, the highest ranked in the school district. In 2008, Tesoro was the second highest in the district, while in 2007 it was ranked third. In 2015, Tesoro Performing Arts Department (orchestra, band, and choir) was one of the top competitors vying for a Grammy. Now, they are known to be a Grammy Signature School.

The Tesoro High School Chamber Orchestra performed for the State Music Educator's Conference in Sacramento and, along with the Wind Ensemble, performed in Carnegie Hall in April 2007.

Tesoro's choral music department under the leadership of Keith Hancock has also been recognized as one of top choral programs in Southern California, being selected as a 2015 Grammy Signature School for Excellence (one of five in the nation) and having received an invitation to perform at the 2012 and 2016 American Choral Directors Association Western Division Conferences. In 2013, Tesoro's Madrigals performed the world premiere of Un Tesoro Perfecto, by composer Luke Mayernik, at Carnegie Hall in New York. The Tesoro Madrigals won the Golden State South Choral Competition in 2008 and A Cappella won in 2010. In 2005, 2010, and 2011, Tesoro's Barbershop Quartet placed first in the Barbershop Harmony Society Far Western District High School Quartet Championship. The choir has performed extensively throughout Southern California, as well as Spain, Germany, Austria, Switzerland, England, Ireland, and Mexico. The choir has never received less than a superior rating at an adjudicated festival. In 2017, out of more than 3,300 nominations nationwide, choir director Keith Hancock became the recipient of the 2017 Music Educator Award and was named Grammy Educator of the Year, presented by The Recording Academy and the GRAMMY Foundation.

Tesoro High School's theatre arts department is under the leadership of Cheryl Des Palmes. In 2004 and 2005, Tesoro High School's theatre arts department won many CAPPIES awards. In 2013, Legally Blonde: The Musical won for Best Musical, Best Orchestra, Best Featured Actor in a Musical, and Best Comedic Actress in a Musical, among some 30 nominations. In 2014, their production of Seussical won for Best Musical, Best Orchestra, and again, Best Comedic Actress in a Musical. Additionally, they won two CAPPIES for Once on This Island in 2015 and three for Romeo & Juliet in 2016. The department participates annually in Theatre Festivals including: South Orange County Roleabout, Fullerton Junior College High School Theatre Festival, California Educational Theatre Association's festival, and the Long Beach State High School Theatre Festival.

== Athletics ==
2004 and 2005 teams were ranked among the top 10 high school football teams in Orange County,

2011- 2017 The men's cross country team have qualified for CIF-SS Finals 7 years in a row. In 2013 and 2014 Tesoro men have qualified for CIF State Championships.

== Academics ==
According to the California Department of Education Policy and Evaluation Division, Tesoro High School's 2008 API score was 836, a 21-point growth from 2007 which was 815. There were 2071 students included in this API score.

== Facilities ==
Tesoro is the second newest high school in CUSD. Tesoro opened in 2001 serving Las Flores, Rancho Santa Margarita, Ladera Ranch, Coto de Caza, and Dove Canyon.

The modern school is built in a canyon at the end of the 241 toll road in between Las Flores and Coto de Caza south of Oso Parkway. The school is about 14 miles (23 km) from the Pacific Ocean.

Tesoro has two baseball fields, aquatics facilities, one softball field, one soccer/football practice field (in one of the baseball field's outfields), eight tennis courts, four volleyball courts, two basketball courts, and a football and track stadium. In 2006, the stadium was upgraded with artificial turf and track to match the other district high schools. Over the summers of 2014 and 2015, a group of Tesoro students painted most of the school hallways, themed by subject and adding a unique, vibrant mood to the walls.

A building was built in the summer of 2017 to replace the portable classrooms that occupied the basketball courts and volleyball courts.

== Notable alumni ==
- Erik Hamren (baseball) (2005), MLB Pitcher
- Jenn Proske (2005), Actress
- Nicole "Nikki" Catsouras (2006), known for accident photos of her untimely death
- Christian Yount (2006), NFL long snapper
- Natalie Jacobs (2015), professional soccer player
- Cole Custer (2016), NASCAR driver, 2023 NASCAR Xfinity Series champion
- Mayci Neeley (2013), Brigham Young University tennis player and Star of The Secret Lives of Mormon Wives

== In the media ==
In 2005, two star football players, Scott McKnight and Sam Smith, were expelled for writing explicit and graphic death threats that involved sexual actions. The students wrote the journals for a class assignment that the teacher, to whom they were referring, collected and then promptly notified school officials.

In 2008, seniors Omar Khan and Tanvir Singh were arrested and indicted on several felony and misdemeanor charges, including burglary, identity theft, computer abuse, and records tampering in an elaborate cheating scandal. Khan pled guilty to five felonies and Singh to one felony and one misdemeanor, and were sentenced to jail time, community service, and ordered to pay damages.
