= Laguna Beach Unified School District =

School district in California, United States

Address
- 550 Blumont Street Laguna Beach, California; United States

District information
- Grades: K–12
- Superintendent: Jason Viloria
- NCES District ID: 0620370

Students and staff
- Students: 2,634 (2020–2021)
- Teachers: 142.86 (FTE)
- Staff: 163.21 (FTE)
- Student–teacher ratio: 18.44:1

Other information
- Website: www.lbusd.org

Laguna Beach Unified School District (LBUSD) is a public school district that serves the city of Laguna Beach, California in Orange County, California, United States. The school district also serves portions of Aliso Viejo, Laguna Woods and Newport Beach, though students in the Aliso Viejo portion, as well as the small portion of Laguna Beach that borders El Toro Road can also attend the Capistrano Unified School District. The LBUSD oversees one high school (Laguna Beach High School), one middle school (Thurston Middle School) and two elementary schools (El Morro Elementary School and Top of the World Elementary School). For the 2012–2013 academic year, enrollment was 3045 students with approximately 250 students enrolled at each grade level from K to 12.
