= Ladera Ranch, California =

Census-designated place in California, United States

- Unincorporated community Census-designated place
- Interactive map of Ladera Ranch, California
- Location in California
- Coordinates: 33°32′48″N 117°38′25″W
- Country: United States
- State: California
- County: Orange

Area
  - Total: 4.945 sq mi (12.808 km^{2})
  - Land: 4.945 sq mi (12.808 km^{2})
  - Water: 0 sq mi (0 km^{2}) 0%
- Elevation: 404 ft (123 m)

Population (2020)
  - Total: 26,170
  - Density: 5,292/sq mi (2,043/km^{2})
- Time zone: UTC-8 (PST)
  - Summer (DST): UTC-7 (PDT)
- ZIP Code: 92694
- Area code: 949
- FIPS code: 06-39114
- GNIS feature IDs: 1852155, 2583048

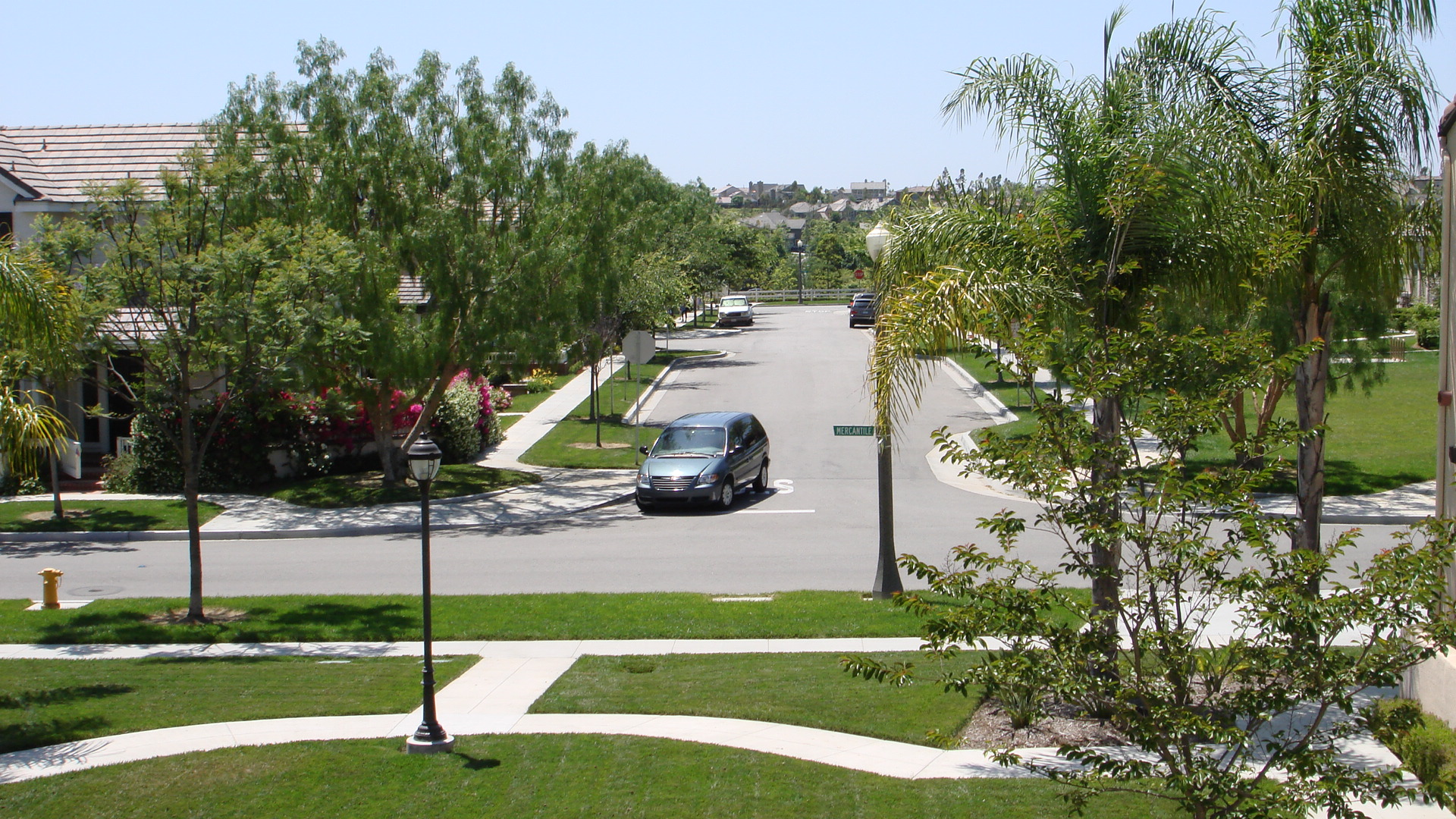
A photograph looking down 3rd St. at its intersection with Mercantile Way in Ladera Ranch

Ladera Ranch is a master-planned community in southern Orange County, California, United States, just outside the city limits of Mission Viejo. For statistical purposes, the United States Census Bureau has defined Ladera Ranch as a census-designated place (CDP). As of the 2020 census, Ladera Ranch had a population of 26,170.

== History ==
Ladera Ranch is a 4,000-acre (16 km^{2}) planned community, bordered by the cities of Mission Viejo and San Juan Capistrano to the west and the city of Rancho Santa Margarita to the north. Located along Antonio Parkway and Crown Valley Parkway, construction of the community began in 1999 on portions of the O'Neill, Avery, & Moiso families' 23,000-acre (93 km^{2}) Rancho Mission Viejo cattle ranch, which was the largest remaining working ranch in Orange County.

=== Cancer cluster ===
In 2026, the California Department of Public Health issued an FAQ, "Cancer Concerns in the Ladera Ranch Community. Several residents reported a high rate of pediatric cancer diagnoses in the Ladera Ranch community. Since 2007, nine children have been diagnosed with Ewing sarcoma, a rare bone cancer. According to the American Cancer Society, approximately 200 children and young adults in the United States are diagnosed with Ewing sarcoma a year. Ladera Ranch children represent a disproportionate number of Ewing sarcoma cases.

== Geography ==
Ladera Ranch is located in the foothills of the Orange County Saddleback. It is bordered by Rancho Mission Viejo to the south, Las Flores to the north, and the city of Mission Viejo to the west.

=== Design and development ===
The Ladera Ranch development is divided into nine "villages". Within each village, individual builders develop an area called a neighborhood. There are ten or more neighborhoods per village. The villages are:

- Oak Knoll Village
- Bridgepark
- Flintridge Village
- Township
- Wycliffe Village
- Echo Ridge Village
- Avendale Villages
- Terramor Village
- Covenant Hills

Four of the nine villages have clubhouses themed on a particular architecture style that is emphasized within that village. There are also parks, pools, playgrounds and open areas within each village. The Covenant Hills village is a gated community which is closed to the general public, but accessible to all card-carrying residents of Ladera Ranch. There are no other gated villages in the community.

In addition to the various clubhouses, the community has a private water park and skate park, 18 community parks, a dog park, six smaller neighborhood pools, many pocket parks and green belts, shopping districts called Mercantile East and Mercantile West Shopping Centers, and miles of hiking/biking trails that connect to Doheny Beach.

== Demographics ==
Historical population
Census	Pop.	Note	%±
2010	22,980		—
2020	26,170		13.9%
U.S. Decennial Census; 1850–1870 1880-1890; 1900 1910 1920; 1930 1940 1950; 1960 1970 1980; 1990 2000 2010; 2020

Ladera Ranch first appeared as a census designated place in the 2010 U.S. census.

=== Racial and ethnic composition ===
Ladera Ranch CDP, California – Racial and ethnic composition Note: the US Census treats Hispanic/Latino as an ethnic category. This table excludes Latinos from the racial categories and assigns them to a separate category. Hispanics/Latinos may be of any race.
Race / Ethnicity (NH = Non-Hispanic)	Pop 2010	Pop 2020	% 2010	% 2020
White alone (NH)	15,939	17,039	69.36%	65.11%
Black or African American alone (NH)	312	253	1.36%	0.97%
Native American or Alaska Native alone (NH)	33	40	0.14%	0.15%
Asian alone (NH)	2,734	3,389	11.90%	12.95%
Native Hawaiian or Pacific Islander alone (NH)	27	28	0.12%	0.11%
Other Race alone (NH)	31	115	0.13%	0.44%
Mixed Race or Multiracial (NH)	952	1,699	4.14%	6.49%
Hispanic or Latino (any race)	2,952	3,607	12.85%	13.78%
Total	22,980	26,170	100.00%	100.00%

=== 2020 census ===
As of the 2020 census, Ladera Ranch had a population of 26,170 and a population density of 5,292.2 inhabitants per square mile (2,043.3/km^{2}).

The census reported that 99.96% of residents lived in households and 0.04% lived in non-institutionalized group quarters, with none institutionalized. 100.0% of residents lived in urban areas, while 0.0% lived in rural areas.

The age distribution was 35.0% under the age of 18, 7.5% aged 18 to 24, 24.0% aged 25 to 44, 26.9% aged 45 to 64, and 6.5% who were 65 years of age or older. The median age was 34.9 years. For every 100 females there were 96.0 males, and for every 100 females age 18 and over there were 91.7 males age 18 and over.

There were 7,934 households, of which 58.9% had children under the age of 18 living in them. Of all households, 69.2% were married-couple households, 3.3% were cohabiting couple households, 18.0% were households with a female householder and no spouse or partner present, and 9.5% were households with a male householder and no spouse or partner present. About 12.8% of all households were made up of individuals and 5.6% had someone living alone who was 65 years of age or older. The average household size was 3.3. There were 6,665 families (84.0% of all households).

There were 8,139 housing units at an average density of 1,645.9 units per square mile (635.5 units/km^{2}), of which 7,934 (97.5%) were occupied; 70.6% were owner-occupied and 29.4% were occupied by renters. The homeowner vacancy rate was 1.0%, and the rental vacancy rate was 3.6%.

Racial composition as of the 2020 census
Race	Number	Percent
White	17,979	68.7%
Black or African American	268	1.0%
American Indian and Alaska Native	104	0.4%
Asian	3,436	13.1%
Native Hawaiian and Other Pacific Islander	30	0.1%
Some other race	888	3.4%
Two or more races	3,465	13.2%
Hispanic or Latino (of any race)	3,607	13.8%

=== 2010 census ===
The 2010 United States census reported that Ladera Ranch had a population of 22,980. The population density was 4,685.2 inhabitants per square mile (1,809.0/km^{2}). The racial makeup of Ladera Ranch was 17,899 (77.9%) White (69.4% Non-Hispanic White), 335 (1.5%) African American, 54 (0.2%) Native American, 2,774 (12.1%) Asian, 27 (0.1%) Pacific Islander, 624 (2.7%) from other races, and 1,267 (5.5%) from two or more races. Hispanic or Latino of any race were 2,952 persons (12.8%).

The Census reported that 22,980 people (100% of the population) lived in households, 0 (0%) lived in non-institutionalized group quarters, and 0 (0%) were institutionalized.

There were 7,115 households, out of which 4,418 (62.1%) had children under the age of 18 living in them, 4,996 (70.2%) were opposite-sex married couples living together, 620 (8.7%) had a female householder with no spouse present, 274 (3.9%) had a male householder with no spouse present. There were 231 (3.2%) unmarried opposite-sex partnerships, and 72 (1.0%) same-sex married couples or partnerships. 927 households (13.0%) were made up of individuals, and 226 (3.2%) had someone living alone who was 65 years of age or older. The average household size was 3.23. There were 5,890 families (82.8% of all households); the average family size was 3.59.

The population was spread out, with 8,812 people (38.3%) under the age of 18, 892 people (3.9%) aged 18 to 24, 8,639 people (37.6%) aged 25 to 44, 3,802 people (16.5%) aged 45 to 64, and 835 people (3.6%) who were 65 years of age or older. The median age was 32.4 years. For every 100 females, there were 96.3 males. For every 100 females age 18 and over, there were 92.1 males.

There were 7,410 housing units at an average density of 1,510.8 units per square mile (583.3 units/km^{2}), of which 5,204 (73.1%) were owner-occupied, and 1,911 (26.9%) were occupied by renters. The homeowner vacancy rate was 1.9%; the rental vacancy rate was 4.7%. 17,572 people (76.5% of the population) lived in owner-occupied housing units and 5,408 people (23.5%) lived in rental housing units.

=== Income ===
In 2023, the US Census Bureau estimated that the median household income was $184,257, and the per capita income was $74,419. About 4.6% of families and 4.1% of the population were below the poverty line.

According to the 2010 United States Census, Ladera Ranch had a median household income of $131,892, with 4.0% of the population living below the federal poverty line.

== Government ==
=== Local ===
As a part of unincorporated Orange County, Ladera Ranch is governed by the Orange County Board of Supervisors as part of the Fifth District.

=== Law enforcement ===
Law enforcement services in Ladera Ranch are provided by the Orange County Sheriff's Department and the California Highway Patrol.

=== Politics ===
United States Presidential Election Results in Ladera Ranch, California
Year	Democratic	Republican	Third Parties
2020	46.25% 6,190	49.87% 6,674	3.88% 519
2016	36.88% 3,862	49.52% 5,185	13.60% 1,424
2012	33.75% 3,230	63.95% 6,119	2.30% 220
2008	42.92% 3,710	55.21% 4,772	1.87% 162
2004	31.51% 1,644	67.24% 3,508	1.25% 65

In the last five presidential elections, Ladera Ranch supported the Republican presidential candidates.

=== Community organizations ===
The Ladera Ranch Maintenance Corporation (LARMAC) is the homeowners association formed to manage, maintain, and govern the LARMAC Property. LARMAC enforces its Governing Documents and imposes architectural control in the community. Each homeowner in the community is a Member of LARMAC. The LARMAC board of directors oversees its operations. Day-to-day activities are performed by the general manager and supervised by the LARMAC Board. Two essential committees assist the board of directors in overseeing its operations; the Aesthetic Review Committee, which has jurisdiction over design, development, aesthetics and the character of the community, and the Covenant Committee, which enforces the use restrictions of the community in accordance with the Governing Documents.

Ladera Ranch Community Services (LARCS) is an independent non-profit public benefit corporation (Community Services Organization) led by an elected five member board of directors. LARCS primary purpose is to enhance the lifestyle for the residents of Ladera Ranch through community and neighborhood events, recreational programs, resident led clubs and community groups, coordination of volunteer opportunities and resident communication which includes the management of the community website, resident communication which includes the management of the community website, LaderaLife.com, and the production of the quarterly news magazine, Roots & Wings.

The Ladera Ranch Civic Council (LRCC) is a volunteer group that advises the Orange County Board of Supervisors. The council has no official municipal role or legal authority. The seven-member Civic Council board of directors focuses on topics within Ladera Ranch that are traditionally associated with a municipal body, such as planning and land use, public safety, and infrastructure.

Ladera-Rancho Chamber of Commerce is currently working in partnership with LARCS to promote business awareness within the community through community events.

The community sponsors the annual Fourth of July Celebration, a Summer Concert series, Family Campout, movie night in the park, Spring and Fall Festivals, National Night Out, Christmas Tree Lighting Ceremony and Santa visit, and a Bark, Biscuits, and Brew event, as well as partnership events with local charities and vendors.

There are plenty of activities for youth of all ages as the community is well represented by AYSO, Ladera Football League, Little League Baseball, Lacrosse, NJB Basketball, Gators Swim Team, Boy Scouts, Cub Scouts, Girl Scouts, Venturing, and YMCA Adventure Guides. The community also has a Teen Leadership Council which is composed of 25 youth between 7th and 12th Grades who assist with programming and activities for community youth.

== Education ==
The community is served by the Capistrano Unified School District. A branch of the Orange County Public Library is also located on the campus of Ladera Ranch School.

Within the community are the Chaparral and Oso Grande Elementary Schools and the Ladera Ranch School, which is home to both an elementary school and a middle school on the same campus.

Chaparral Elementary School received the "California Distinguished School Award" in both 2004 and 2008. Ladera Ranch School opened in 2003, and the Middle School received the "California Distinguished School Award" in 2007 and has been nominated again in 2011.

Depending on which part of the community they live in, high school students attend either San Juan Hills High School in San Juan Capistrano or Tesoro High School in Las Flores. Prior to its opening in 2007, students in areas currently served by San Juan Hills attended Capistrano Valley High School. A number of Ladera Ranch's students have attended Capistrano Valley, either due to having begun attendance prior to 2007, or by virtue of having been "grandfathered" in through siblings' attendance.

Private schools within a short distance to Ladera Ranch are Santa Margarita Catholic High School, J. Serra Catholic School and St. Margaret's Academy.

The community is close to Saddleback College in Mission Viejo and Soka University of America in Aliso Viejo.

== Notable people ==
- Chester Burnett – retired National Football League player
- Jonathon Blum – professional hockey player, Olympic Athlete
- Cole Custer – stock car racing driver
- Brent Frohoff – retired professional volleyball player
- Tamra Judge - businesswoman and television personality
- Mike Napoli – Major League Baseball player
- Nick Punto – Major League Baseball player
- Mark Sanchez – retired National Football League player
- Omarion – R&B artist
- Quinton "Rampage" Jackson – former UFC Light Heavyweight Champion, mixed martial artist and actor
- Rob Adams – Actor
- Rob Johnson – retired National Football League player
- Skip Schumaker – Former Major League Baseball player
- Klay Thompson – NBA Basketball Player
- Mychal Thompson – retired NBA Basketball Player
- Trayce Thompson – Major League Baseball player
- Warren G – rap artist and hip hop producer
