= Peloza v. Capistrano School District =

- Court: United States Court of Appeals for the Ninth Circuit
- Full case name: Peloza v. Capistrano School District
- Argued: June 9, 1993
- Decided: October 4, 1994
- Citations: 37 F.3d 517 (9th Cir. 1994); 94 Ed. Law Rep. 1159

Case history
- Prior history: 782 F. Supp. 1412 (C.D. Cal. 1992)

Court membership
- Judges sitting: William A. Fletcher, Cecil F. Poole, David R. Thompson

Case opinions
- Per curiam
- Concur/dissent: Poole

Laws applied
- First Amendment

Keywords
- Creationism; Evolution; Free speech

Peloza v. Capistrano Unified School District, 37 F.3d 517 (9th Cir. 1994), was a 1994 court case heard by United States Court of Appeals for the Ninth Circuit in which a creationist schoolteacher, John E. Peloza, claimed that the Establishment Clause of the United States Constitution along with his own right to free speech was violated by the requirement to teach the "religion" of "evolutionism". The court found against Peloza, finding that evolution was science not religion and that the Capistrano Unified School District school board were right to restrict his teaching of creationism in light of the 1987 Supreme Court decision Edwards v. Aguillard. One of the three appeals judges, Poole, partially dissented from the majority's free speech and due process opinions. It was one in a long line of court cases involving the teaching of creationism which have found against creationists. Peloza appealed to the Supreme Court, which declined to hear the case.
