= Coto de Caza, California =

- Unincorporated community Census-designated place
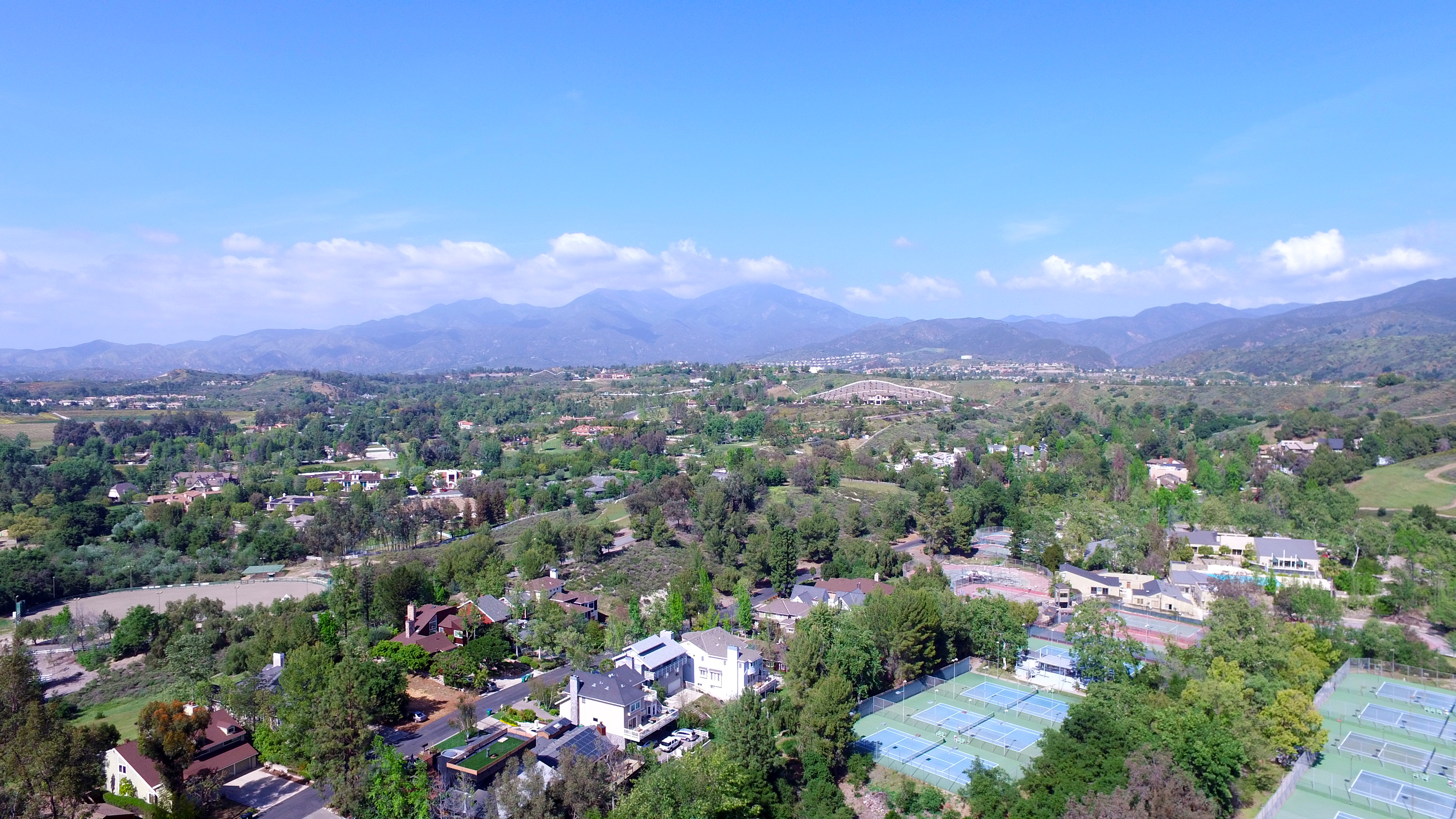
- Coto de Caza in 2016
- Interactive map of Coto de Caza, California
- Location in California Location in the United States
- Coordinates: 33°35′45″N 117°35′16″W
- Country: United States
- State: California
- County: Orange

Area
  - Total: 7.82 sq mi (20.26 km^{2})
  - Land: 7.80 sq mi (20.20 km^{2})
  - Water: 0.023 sq mi (0.06 km^{2}) 0.30%
- Elevation: 709 ft (216 m)

Population (2020)
  - Total: 14,710
  - Density: 1,886.4/sq mi (728.36/km^{2})
- Time zone: UTC-8 (PST)
  - Summer (DST): UTC-7 (PDT)
- ZIP code: 92679
- Area code: 949
- FIPS code: 06-16580
- GNIS feature IDs: 1867008, 2407666
- Website: community.dwellinglive.com/czmaster.aspx

Coto de Caza (KOH-toh deh KAH-zuh; Spanish for "hunting reserve") is a census-designated place (CDP) and guard-gated private community in Orange County, California, United States. The population was 14,710 at the 2020 census.

The CDP is a suburban planned community of about 4,000 homes and one of Orange County's oldest and most expensive master-planned communities. The project began in 1968, when it was envisioned as a hunting lodge, now the Lodge at Coto de Caza, and the community was completed in 2003. Coto de Caza also includes Los Ranchos Estates, a 355-acre rural community of 75 large custom homes. Los Ranchos Estates is a separate private community behind the gates of Coto de Caza and has its own homeowner's association.

== History ==
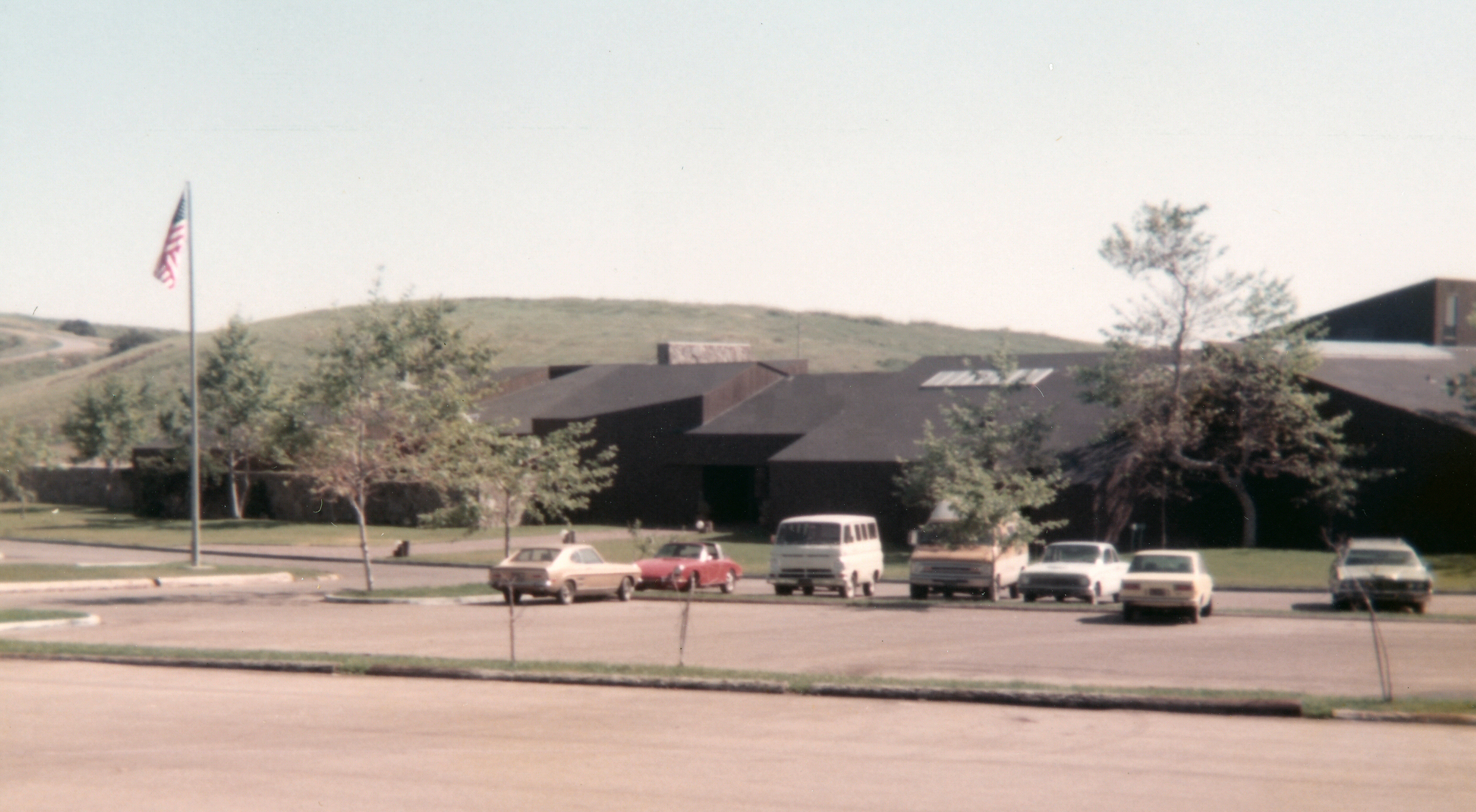
Coto de Caza as it appeared in 1974

The land that became Coto de Caza was originally part of Rancho Mission Viejo.

The suburban planned community of Coto de Caza was a joint venture of Chevron and Arvida corporations. Development was first initiated in 1964. In 1979, Arvida bought out Chevron. Richard Boultinghouse, who had previously developed McCormick Ranch in Scottsdale, Arizona, was hired as president and general manager. In 1983, Orange County approved Coto's master plan for a community of approximately 5,000 homes, and three years later, the community officially opened. Coto de Caza's reputation as an ecologically oriented recreation community was strengthened by the former Vic Braden’s Tennis College and a 36-hole Robert Trent Jones Jr.-designed golf course.

In 1984, Arvida, Disney, Chevron, and City Federal Savings & Loan partnered in the development of Coto de Caza. Boultinghouse was later replaced by John C Yelverton.

In 1996, Lennar took over as development manager. Under Lennar’s stewardship, Coto de Caza was repositioned to promote more luxurious homes and lower densities, coincident with the regional recovery from the recent recession. The average price of a home in Coto de Caza increased from $375,000 in 1996 to $840,000 in 2000, to well over a million dollars.

== Geography ==
Coto de Caza is located in the northern portion of Wagon Wheel Canyon in southeast Orange County, at 33°35′45″N 117°35′16″W (33.595925, -117.587665).

According to the United States Census Bureau, the CDP has a total area of 7.8 square miles (20 km^{2}), of which, 7.8 square miles (20 km^{2}) of it is land and 0.02 square miles (0.052 km^{2}) of it (0.30%) is water.

=== Climate ===
According to the Köppen Climate Classification system, Coto de Caza has a warm-summer Mediterranean climate, abbreviated "Csa" on climate maps.

== Demographics ==
Historical population
Census	Pop.	Note	%±
1990	2,853		—
2000	13,057		357.7%
2010	14,866		13.9%
2020	14,710		−1.0%
U.S. Decennial Census; 1850–1870 1880-1890; 1900 1910 1920; 1930 1940 1950; 1960 1970 1980; 1990 2000 2010; 2020

Coto de Caza first appeared as a census designated place in the 1990 U.S. census. Prior to that, the area was part of the Trabuco census county division (pop 70,221 in 1980).

=== Racial and ethnic composition ===
Coto de Caza CDP, California – Racial and ethnic composition Note: the US Census treats Hispanic/Latino as an ethnic category. This table excludes Latinos from the racial categories and assigns them to a separate category. Hispanics/Latinos may be of any race.
Race / Ethnicity (NH = Non-Hispanic)	Pop 1990	Pop 2000	Pop 2010	Pop 2020	% 1990	% 2000	% 2010	% 2020
White alone (NH)	2,578	11,098	12,219	10,722	90.36%	85.00%	82.19%	72.89%
Black or African American alone (NH)	17	92	129	178	0.60%	0.70%	0.87%	1.21%
Native American or Alaska Native alone (NH)	10	17	23	15	0.35%	0.13%	0.15%	0.10%
Asian alone (NH)	101	663	860	1,354	3.54%	5.08%	5.79%	9.20%
Native Hawaiian or Pacific Islander alone (NH)	101	18	20	7	3.54%	0.14%	0.13%	0.05%
Other race alone (NH)	3	25	30	73	0.11%	0.19%	0.20%	0.50%
Mixed race or Multiracial (NH)	x	276	415	839	x	2.11%	2.79%	5.70%
Hispanic or Latino (any race)	144	868	1,170	1,522	5.05%	6.65%	7.87%	10.35%
Total	2,853	13,057	14,866	14,710	100.00%	100.00%	100.00%	100.00%

=== 2020 census ===
As of the 2020 census, Coto de Caza had a population of 14,710 and a population density of 1,885.9 inhabitants per square mile (728.2/km^{2}). The median age was 46.6 years. 22.2% of residents were under the age of 18 and 15.8% were 65 years of age or older. For every 100 females, there were 97.3 males, and for every 100 females age 18 and over, there were 95.1 males age 18 and over.

The Census reported that all residents lived in households. 98.1% of residents lived in urban areas, while 1.9% lived in rural areas.

There were 4,876 households, of which 36.9% had children under the age of 18 living in them. Of all households, 77.3% were married-couple households, 7.5% were households with a male householder and no spouse or partner present, and 12.6% were households with a female householder and no spouse or partner present. About 10.1% of all households were made up of individuals and 5.4% had someone living alone who was 65 years of age or older. The average household size was 3.02. There were 4,269 families (87.6% of all households).

There were 4,992 housing units, of which 2.3% were vacant and 4,876 (97.7%) were occupied. Of occupied units, 91.2% were owner-occupied and 8.8% were occupied by renters. The homeowner vacancy rate was 0.7% and the rental vacancy rate was 4.9%.

=== Income and poverty ===
In 2023, the US Census Bureau estimated that the median household income was $232,470, and the per capita income was $103,122. About 2.9% of families and 3.7% of the population were below the poverty line.

=== 2010 census ===
The 2010 United States census reported that Coto de Caza had a population of 14,866. The population density was 1,864.2 inhabitants per square mile (719.8/km^{2}). The racial makeup of Coto de Caza was 13,094 (88.1%) White (82.2% Non-Hispanic White), 132 (0.9%) African American, 26 (0.2%) Native American, 878 (5.9%) Asian, 20 (0.1%) Pacific Islander, 174 (1.2%) from other races, and 542 (3.6%) from two or more races. Hispanic or Latino of any race were 1,170 persons (7.9%).

The Census reported that 14,866 people (100% of the population) lived in households, 0 (0%) lived in non-institutionalized group quarters, and 0 (0%) were institutionalized.

There were 4,736 households, out of which 2,407 (50.8%) had children under the age of 18 living in them, 3,763 (79.5%) were opposite-sex married couples living together, 294 (6.2%) had a female householder with no husband present, 133 (2.8%) had a male householder with no wife present. There were 96 (2.0%) unmarried opposite-sex partnerships, and 30 (0.6%) same-sex married couples or partnerships. 420 households (8.9%) were made up of individuals, and 116 (2.4%) had someone living alone who was 65 years of age or older. The average household size was 3.14. There were 4,190 families (88.5% of all households); the average family size was 3.35.

The population was spread out, with 4,545 people (30.6%) under the age of 18, 996 people (6.7%) aged 18 to 24, 2,706 people (18.2%) aged 25 to 44, 5,452 people (36.7%) aged 45 to 64, and 1,167 people (7.9%) who were 65 years of age or older. The median age was 42.2 years. For every 100 females, there were 96.8 males. For every 100 females age 18 and over, there were 95.1 males.

There were 4,853 housing units at an average density of 608.6 per square mile (235.0/km^{2}), of which 4,341 (91.7%) were owner-occupied, and 395 (8.3%) were occupied by renters. The homeowner vacancy rate was 1.0%; the rental vacancy rate was 1.5%. 13,738 people (92.4% of the population) lived in owner-occupied housing units and 1,128 people (7.6%) lived in rental housing units.

According to the 2010 United States census, Coto de Caza had a median household income of $169,176, with 2.0% of the population living below the federal poverty line.

== Economy ==
Residents shop in Rancho Santa Margarita, Mission Viejo, Las Flores, or Ladera Ranch.

== Thomas F. Riley Wilderness Park ==
The Thomas F. Riley Wilderness Park, which is open to the general public, surrounds the community of Coto de Caza on its eastern, northern, and southern borders. The park is a Wildlife and Plant Sanctuary. Its nature center houses an educational center for outdoor education for local schools and community groups. It also serves as an ecological preserve for the native endangered plant and animal species. The park is maintained and paid for by Orange County Parks, and is administered by Park Rangers and maintenance staff.

== Education ==
Most students in Coto de Caza reside in the Capistrano Unified School District and attend Tijeras Creek Elementary, Wagon Wheel Elementary, Las Flores Middle School, Tesoro High School, and Santa Margarita Catholic High School (located at the North Gate and not part of Capistrano Unified). St. John's Episcopal School and St. Junipero Serra Catholic School are private elementary and middle schools located outside the gates in nearby Rancho Santa Margarita.

The residents rebuffed an attempt to build a 400-student public school within the walls of the community. They had concerns that it would "undermine the privacy and security" of the enclave, that it would be "downright illegal [to place a public school on a gated private property]", that it would force admission of large numbers of non-residents to the community, and that an eventual lawsuit would force the removal of the gates. The reason for proposal was that Wagon Wheel Elementary School, which is located immediately outside the community gates, had far more students than planned. The school equipment was to consist of 20 portable buildings which would have simply been added to Wagon Wheel if the new school's construction could not be completed. Had it been built, it would have become the first public school to be built inside the limits of a gated community.

== Politics and Government ==
In the California State Legislature, Coto de Caza is in the 38th senatorial district, represented by Democrat Catherine Blakespear, and in the 71st Assembly district, represented by Republican Kate Sanchez.

In the United States House of Representatives, Coto de Caza is in California's 40th congressional district, represented by Republican Young Kim.

Coto de Caza gave more than 65 percent support to Proposition 8 in 2008.

The area is patrolled by the California Highway Patrol, Orange County Sheriff's Department, and the Coto de Caza security force.

== Popular Culture ==
For the 1984 Summer Olympics, the community served as host to the riding, running, shooting, and fencing portions of the modern pentathlon events. Princess Anne of the United Kingdom attended the event to support Richard Phelps, who finished fourth at the Olympic event.

The community was the original setting of the reality-based television show The Real Housewives of Orange County on Bravo, though over the years the show has expanded into other places like Newport Beach.

== Notable people ==
- Gideon Ariel (born 1939), Israeli Olympic competitor in the shot put and discus throw
- Linda Blair, actress with most notable role in the movie The Exorcist
- Rob Bourdon, drummer for the band Linkin Park
- Rod Carew, Baseball Hall of Famer
- Parker Case, guitarist for the band Say Anything and singer/guitarist for the band JamisonParker
- Michael Chang, former French Open singles champion at age 17
- Madison Curry, soccer player for Angel City FC
- Morris Day, musician
- Jim Everett, retired Los Angeles Rams quarterback
- Dave "Phoenix" Farrell, bassist for the band Linkin Park
- Ryan Getzlaf, ice hockey captain for the Anaheim Ducks - Los Ranchos Estates
- Paul Goydos, PGA Tour professional
- Bobby Grich, retired Los Angeles Angels second baseman
- Vicki Gunvalson, Original housewife of Bravo TV series
- Akeem Hunt, football former running back for the Kansas City Chiefs
- Jeana Keough, Original housewife of Bravo TV series
- Nancy Lerner, philanthropist and billionaire - Los Ranchos Estates
- William Lyon, retired major general of the United States Air Force
- Booger McFarland, NFL commentator
- Bode Miller, Olympic and World Championship gold medalist skier - Los Ranchos Estates
- Robb Nen, former Major League Baseball right-handed relief pitcher
- Teemu Selänne, retired Finnish ice hockey player "The Finnish Flash" and Stanley Cup Champion - Los Ranchos Estates
- Peter Vidmar, Olympic medalist in gymnastics (2 golds, 1 silver)
- Tamra Judge, RHOC, Real Housewives of Orange County

== See also ==
- Canyon Lake, California
- Trabuco Canyon, California
