= Capistrano Unified School District =

School district in California

Address
- 33122 Valle Road San Juan Capistrano, California, 92675; United States

District information
- Type: Public
- Grades: K–12
- Established: 1965
- Superintendent: Dr. Christopher Brown
- NCES District ID: 0607440

Students and staff
- Students: 40.836 (2023-2024)
- Teachers: 1882.72 (FTE)
- Staff: 2,086.32 (FTE)
- Student–teacher ratio: 21.69

Other information
- Website: www.capousd.org

Capistrano Unified School District (CUSD) is the largest school district in Orange County, California, United States. It is the 9th largest district in the state and the 78th largest in the country. The district currently has 54,036 students and administers 33 elementary schools, two K-8 schools, ten middle schools, six comprehensive high schools, five charter schools, and multiple alternative education programs.

CUSD has 40 California Distinguished Schools, 11 National Blue Ribbon Schools, 19 Golden Bell winning programs, and 36 California Business Honor Roll Schools, among many other award-winning schools and school programs. The district has a graduation rate of 97.2%, much higher than California's average of 85.1%. Every CUSD high school is ranked in the top 1000 US high schools by U.S. News & World Report.

Formed in 1965, Capistrano Unified School District encompasses 195 square miles (510 km^{2}) and employs 3,992 people, making it the largest employer in South Orange County. With Laguna Beach Unified School District, it is part of the College and Career Advantage (formerly South Coast Regional Occupational Program) (ROP).

== Service area ==
The school district serves all of Dana Point, Laguna Niguel, San Juan Capistrano, and San Clemente. In addition, it serves the unincorporated areas of Las Flores, Ladera Ranch, Coto de Caza, and Rancho Mission Viejo. The school district also serves portions of Mission Viejo, Rancho Santa Margarita, and Aliso Viejo. A tiny portion of Aliso Viejo and a tiny portion of Laguna Beach off El Toro Road south of Aliso Creek Road are contracted out to the Laguna Beach Unified School District in Laguna Beach. However, students who live in those areas typically choose to attend the schools in the Capistrano district due to the convenience. Also, while Laguna Woods has no schools due to it being a retirement community, students who live with relatives in the area may choose to attend schools in the Capistrano district.

== Schools ==
=== Elementary schools ===
- Aliso Viejo
  - Canyon Vista Elementary School (California Distinguished School and California Business for Education Excellence "Scholar" School)
  - Don Juan Avila Elementary School (California Distinguished School and California Business for Education Excellence "Scholar" School)
  - Oak Grove Elementary School (California Distinguished School and California Business for Education Excellence "Scholar" School)
  - Wood Canyon Elementary School (California Distinguished School)
- Dana Point
  - Palisades Elementary School
  - R.H. Dana Elementary School (California Distinguished School and National Blue Ribbon School)
  - R.H. Dana Exceptional Needs Facility
- Ladera Ranch
  - Chaparral Elementary School (California Distinguished School and California Business for Education Excellence "Scholar" School)
  - Ladera Ranch Elementary School (California Business for Education Excellence "Scholar" School)
  - Oso Grande Elementary School (California Business for Education Excellence "Scholar" School)
- Laguna Niguel
  - George White Elementary School (California Distinguished School and California Business for Education Excellence "Scholar" School)
  - Hidden Hills Elementary School (California Distinguished School)
  - John S. Malcom Elementary School (California Distinguished School, National Blue Ribbon School, and California Business for Education Excellence "Scholar" School)
  - Laguna Niguel Elementary School (California Distinguished School and California Business for Education Excellence "Scholar" School)
  - Marian Bergeson Elementary School (California Distinguished School and California Business for Education Excellence "Scholar" School)
  - Moulton Elementary School (California Distinguished School, National Blue Ribbon School, and California Business for Education Excellence "Scholar" School)
- Las Flores
  - Wagon Wheel Elementary School (California Business for Education Excellence "Scholar" School)
- Mission Viejo
  - Bathgate Elementary School (California Distinguished School, National Blue Ribbon School, and California Business for Education Excellence "Scholar" School)
  - Castille Elementary School (California Distinguished School and California Business for Education Excellence "Scholar" School)
  - Phillip Reilly Elementary School (California Distinguished School and National Blue Ribbon School
  - Viejo Elementary two-way language immersion school
- Rancho Santa Margarita
  - Tijeras Creek Elementary School (California Distinguished School and California Business for Education Excellence "Scholar" School)
- San Clemente
  - Clarence Lobo Elementary School (California Distinguished School)
  - Concordia Elementary School (California Distinguished School and California Business for Education Excellence "Scholar" School)
  - Las Palmas Elementary two-way language immersion school (California Distinguished School)
  - Marblehead Elementary School
  - Truman Benedict Elementary School (California Distinguished School and California Business for Education Excellence "Scholar" School)
- San Juan Capistrano
  - Del Obispo Elementary School (California Distinguished School)
  - Harold Ambuehl Elementary School (California Distinguished School)
  - Kinoshita Elementary School
  - San Juan Elementary two-way language immersion school

=== K-8 schools ===
- Arroyo Vista K-8 School (California Distinguished School and California Business for Education Excellence "Scholar" School)
- Capistrano Home School
- Carl Hankey K-8 International Baccalaureate World School (California Gold Ribbon School and California Business for Education Excellence "Star" School)
- Esencia K-8 School
- Las Flores K-8 School
- Vista Del Mar K-8 School

=== Middle schools ===
- Aliso Viejo
  - Aliso Viejo Middle School (California Distinguished School and California Business for Education Excellence "Scholar" School)
  - Don Juan Avila Middle School (California Distinguished School and California Business for Education Excellence "Scholar" School)
- Ladera Ranch
  - Ladera Ranch Middle School (California Distinguished School and California Business for Education Excellence "Scholar" School)
- Laguna Niguel
  - Niguel Hills Middle School (California Distinguished School and California Business for Education Excellence "Scholar" School)
- Mission Viejo
  - Newhart Middle School (California Distinguished School, National Blue Ribbon School, and California Business for Education Excellence "Scholar" School)
- Rancho Santa Margarita
- San Clemente
  - Bernice Ayer Middle School (California Distinguished School and California Business for Education Excellence "Scholar" School)
  - Shorecliffs Middle School (California Distinguished School)
- San Juan Capistrano
  - Marco Forster Middle School (California Distinguished School and California Business for Education Excellence "Star" School)

=== High schools ===
- Aliso Viejo
  - Aliso Niguel High School (California Distinguished School, National Blue Ribbon School, California Business for Education Excellence "Scholar" School, U.S. News/World Report "Best High School," Newsweek "Best High School," and US Department of Education New American High School)
- Dana Point
  - Dana Hills High School (California Distinguished School, National Blue Ribbon School, California Business for Education Excellence "Scholar" School, and U.S. News/World Report "Best High School")
- Las Flores
  - Tesoro High School (California Distinguished School, California Business for Education Excellence "Scholar" School, U.S. News/World Report "Best High School," and Newsweek "Best High School")
- Mission Viejo
  - Capistrano Valley High School (California Distinguished School, California Business for Education Excellence "Scholar" School, U.S. News/World Report "Best High School," and International Baccalaureate World School)
- San Clemente
  - San Clemente High School (California Distinguished School, California Business for Education Excellence "Scholar" School, U.S. News/World Report "Best High School," and International Baccalaureate World School)
- San Juan Capistrano
  - California Preparatory Academy virtual school
  - San Juan Hills High School (California Business for Education Excellence "Star" School, U.S. News/World Report "Best High School," and Newsweek "Best High School")

=== Alternative education programs ===
- San Juan Capistrano
  - Capistrano Adult School
  - CUSD Adult Transition Program
  - Union High School (California Department of Education Model Continuation High School)
  - Bridges Community Day High School (6-12)

== Student ethnicity ==
Ethnicity	This district	State average

White, not Hispanic	60.2%	28.6%
Asian	5.4%	8.3%
Hispanic or Latino	25.1%	48.6%
Multiple or no response	5.7%	3.1%
African American, not Hispanic	1.3%	7.4%
Filipino	1.6%	2.7%
Pacific Islander	0.1%	0.6%
American Indian or Alaska Native	0.1%	0.8%

== Controversies ==
In 1994, a science teacher refused to teach evolution because he felt it was a religion. In Peloza v. Capistrano School District, the Ninth Circuit Court of Appeals ruled in favor of the school district.

In 2012, Capistrano Unified School District was found guilty for the wrongful death of three-year old Kevin Cisler, who slowly asphyxiated to death on a bus ride home from preschool. The bus driver and CUSD employees failed to properly secure Kevin in his seat, which resulted in the child asphyxiating with the incorrect placement of his chest restraint and seat belt. In Cisler v. Capistrano Unified School District the jury found CUSD guilty and negligent in its actions.

In 2015, a principal was removed from San Clemente High School. This prompted community outrage and resulted in the removal of the assistant superintendent.

Controversies regarding district management have prompted two efforts to recall school board members.

In 2024, a district principal, Jesus Becerra, violated a six-year-old's First Amendment rights — prompting the Ninth Circuit in 2025 to rule that the school failed to meet its burden under Tinker.

== School board ==
The Capistrano Unified School District has a seven-member board of trustees, with each trustee representing one of seven geographic areas within the school district. Each trustee is elected to a four-year term of office. Trustees must reside in the area they represent.

Current board of trustees:

- Amy Hanacek, Area 1
- Michael Parham, Area 2
- Lisa Davis, Area 3
- Gary Pritchard, Area 4
- Krista Castellanos, Area 5
- Gila Jones, Area 6
- Judy Bullockus, Area 7

The board of trustees is the policy-making body for the school district. It is charged with providing a quality educational program for students in kindergarten through grade 12 in accordance with the California Constitution, the laws of the state, adopted board policies, and the desires of the community.

As elected officials, trustees are state officers responsible for the governance of a political subdivision of the state. The school district is independent of city and county governments, but cooperates with them. In addition to establishing school district policies, the board adopts an annual budget and approves all expenditures, employment decisions, curricula, textbooks, and courses of study, and makes decisions on school sites, building plans and construction contracts. Trustees have no power to act individually in the name of the board. Formal action can be taken only when the board is in session with a quorum of at least half of the trustees.

== The superintendent ==
The administration of the school district is delegated by trustees to a professional administrative staff headed by the superintendent. The superintendent acts as secretary to the board of trustees.

Superintendents since unification:

- 1965-1969 Dr. Charles F. Kenney
- 1969-1975 Truman Benedict
- 1975-1991 Dr. Jerome R. Thornsley
- 1991-2006 Dr. James A. Fleming
- 2007-2007 Dr. Dennis Smith
- 2007-2009 Woodrow Carter
- 2010-2014 Dr. Joseph M. Farley
- 2014–2023 Kirsten M. Vital Brulte
- 2023–present Dr. Christopher Brown

== See also ==
- List of school districts in Orange County, California
