= Rancho Santa Margarita y Las Flores =

Mexican land grant in California

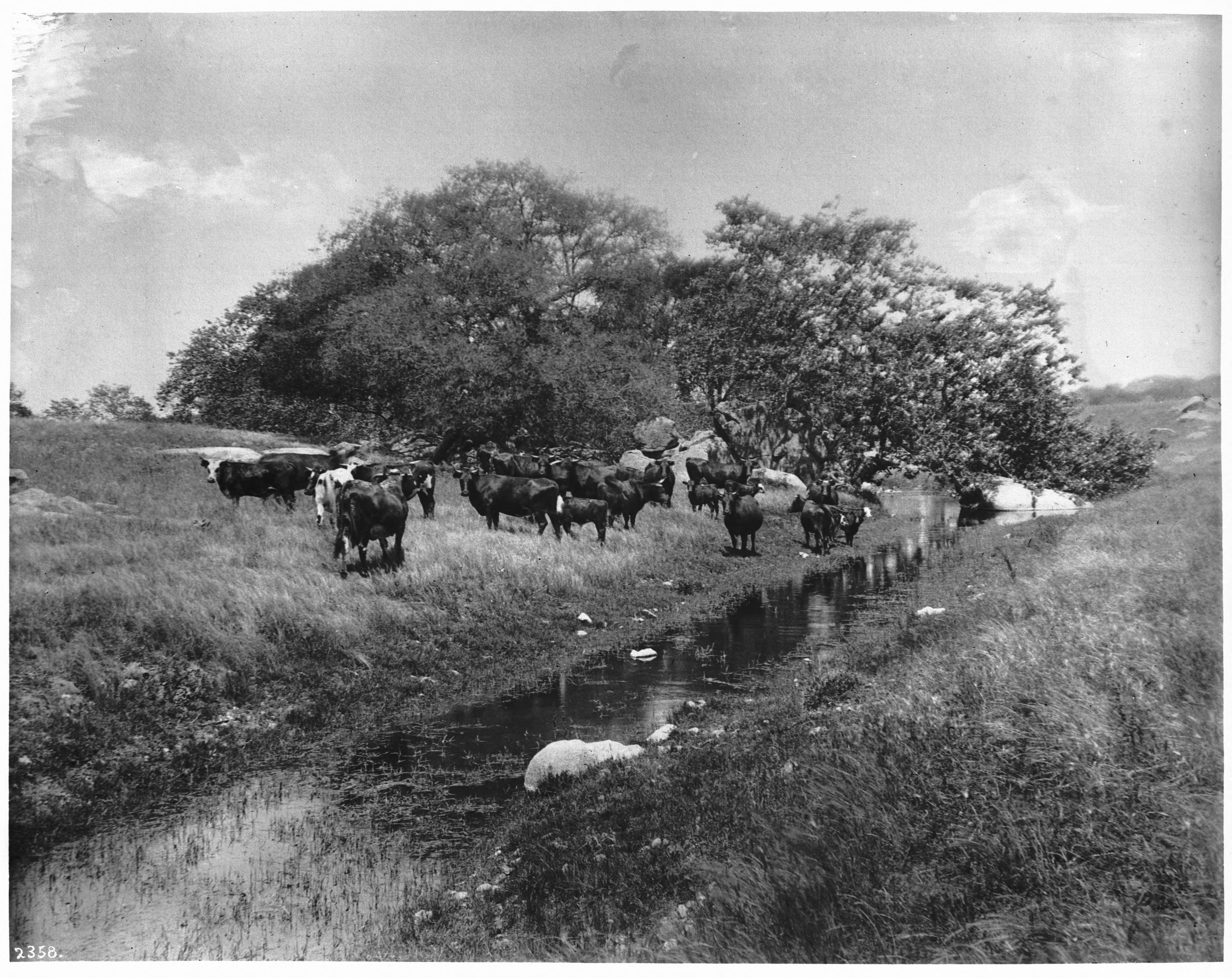

- Location within California
- 33.390°N 117.570°W
- Location: Camp Pendleton

California Historical Landmark
- Official name: Santa Margarita Ranch House
- Reference no.: 1026

Rancho Santa Margarita y Las Flores was a 133,440-acre (540.0 km^{2}) Mexican land grant in present-day northwestern San Diego County, California, given by Governor Juan Alvarado in 1841 to Andrés Pico and Pío Pico. The grant was located along the Pacific coast, and encompassed present-day San Onofre State Beach and Camp Pendleton. The site is now registered as California Historical Landmark #1026.

== History ==
In 1841, during the secularization of California missions, Pio Pico and Andres Pico were granted 89,742-acre (363.17 km^{2}) Rancho San Onofre y Santa Margarita next to the Mission San Juan Capistrano by Alvarado. Three years later, the grant of Rancho Las Flores was added, and the grant renamed Rancho Santa Margarita y Las Flores. Pio Pico and Andres Pico built the first two rooms of the Ranch House. Pio Pico later lost the land in a horse bet with Jose Andres Sepulveda.

With the cession of California to the United States following the Mexican–American War, the 1848 Treaty of Guadalupe Hidalgo provided that the land grants would be honored. As required by the Land Act of 1851, a claim for Rancho Santa Margarita y Las Flores was filed with the Public Land Commission in 1852, and the grant was patented to Pio Pico in 1879.

In 1863, Juan Forster, an Englishman who became a Mexican citizen and married Pio Pico's sister, paid off Pico's debts and received the deed to the Rancho Santa Margarita y Las Flores. In 1864, Forster began expanding the Santa Margarita Ranch House to 18 rooms and turned the land into a cattle ranch. Forster lived at Rancho Santa Margarita some 18 years and greatly expanded the house. When Forster died in 1882, his heirs sold the ranch to Irish immigrant James Flood who selected his friend Richard O'Neill to manage it. James Flood died in 1888. In 1940, James Flood, Jr. gave O'Neill an undivided half ownership. In 1923, Jerome O'Neill and James Flood, Jr. formed a corporation to control the ranch now known as Rancho Santa Margarita.

== Historic sites of the Rancho ==
- Las Flores Estancia

== See also ==
- Rancho Santa Margarita, California
- Rancho Mission Viejo
