= Rancho Santa Margarita, California =

City in California, United States

- City
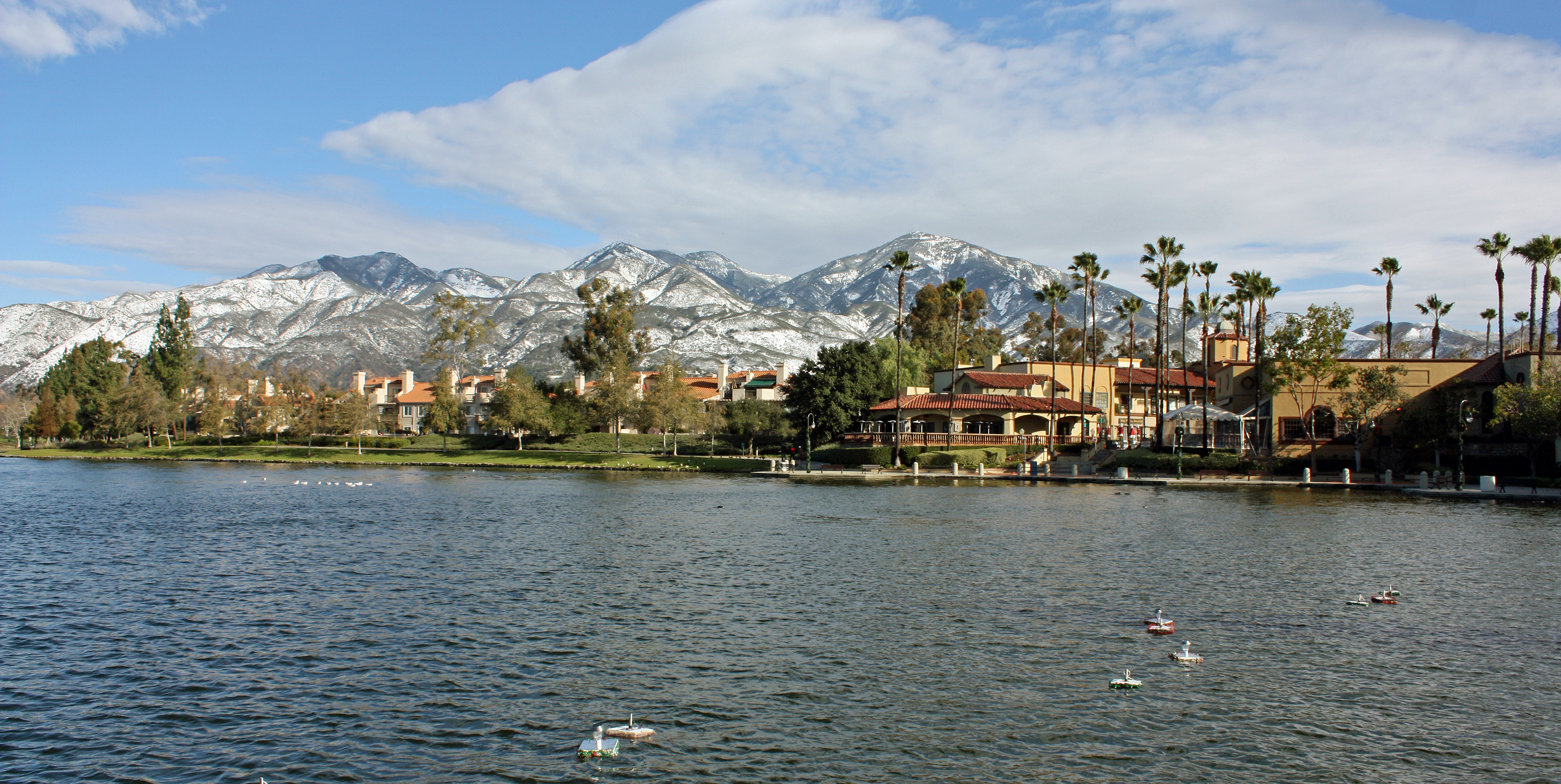
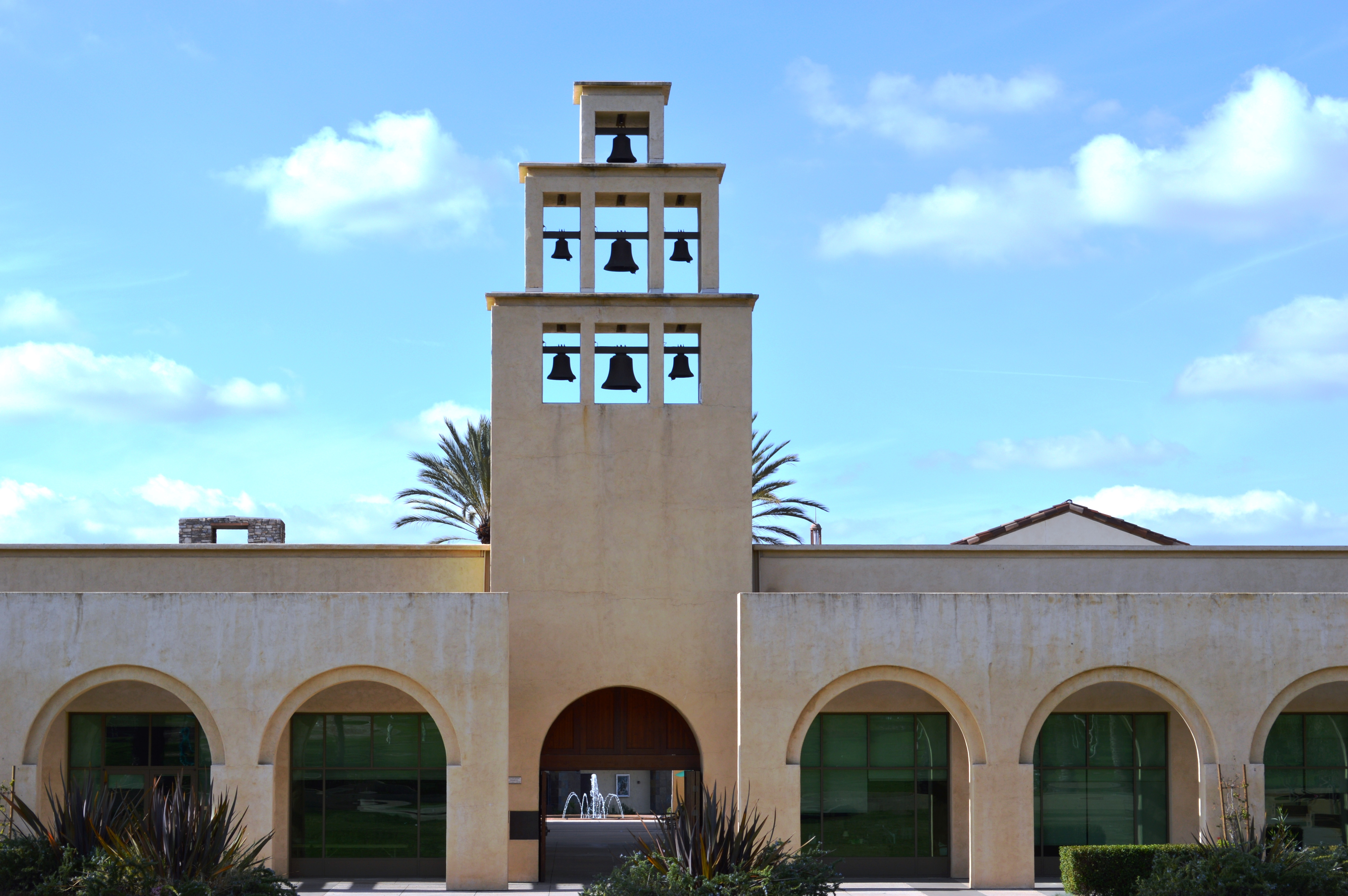
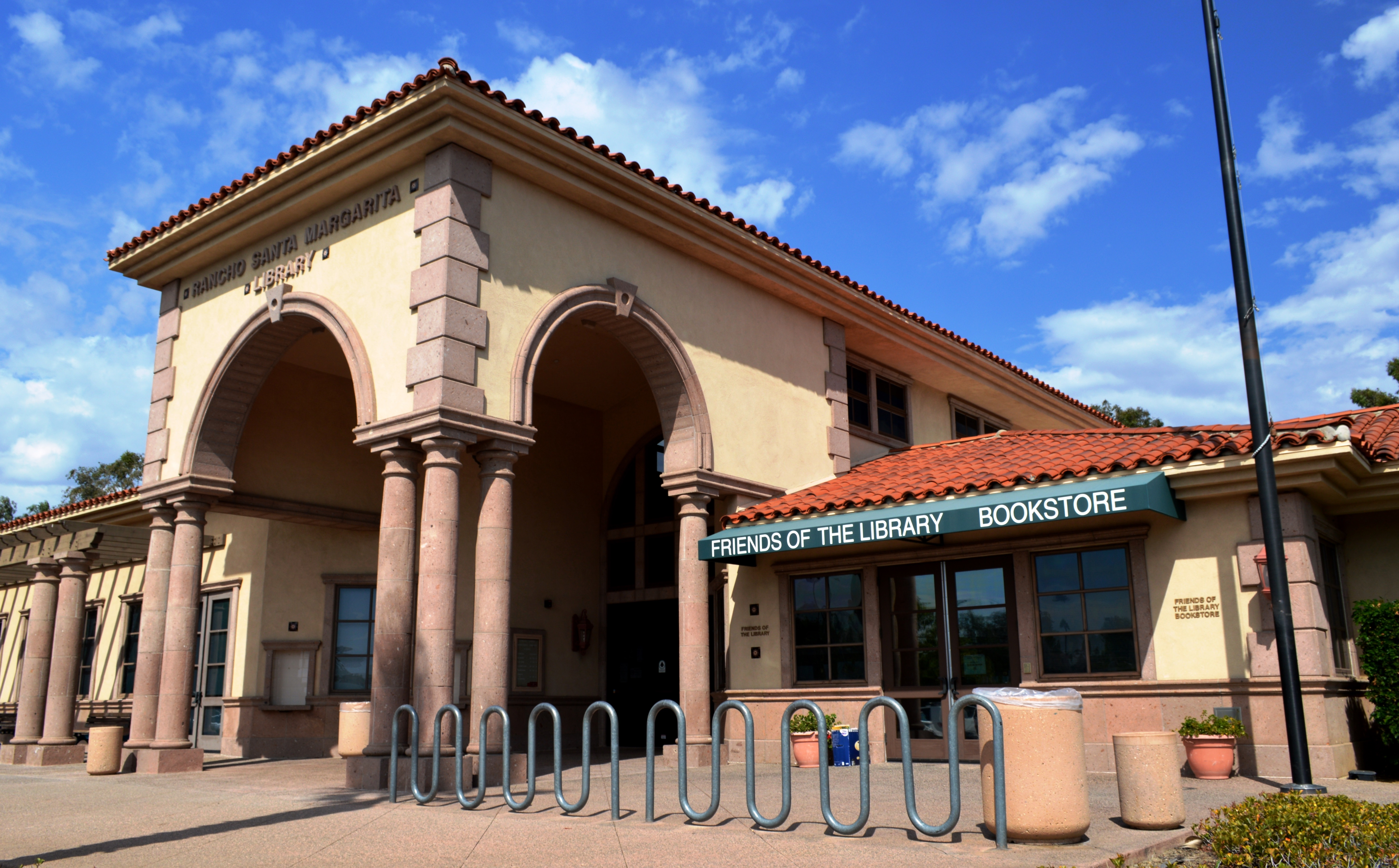
- Lago Santa Margarita City Hall Public Library

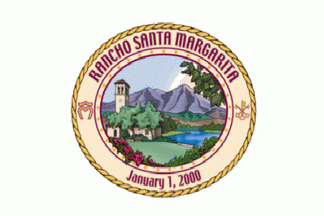
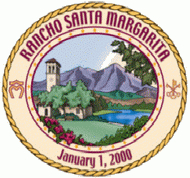
- Flag Seal
- Interactive map of Rancho Santa Margarita, California
- Location in the United States
- Coordinates: 33°38′29″N 117°35′40″W
- Country: United States
- State: California
- County: Orange
- Incorporated: January 1, 2000

Government
  - Type: Council-Manager
  - Mayor: L. Anthony Beall
  - Mayor Pro Tem: Bradley J. McGirr
  - City Council: Keri Lynn Baert; Anne D. Figueroa; Jerry Holloway
  - City Manager: Jennifer M. Cervantez

Area
  - Total: 12.94 sq mi (33.52 km^{2})
  - Land: 12.90 sq mi (33.40 km^{2})
  - Water: 0.046 sq mi (0.12 km^{2}) 0.27%
- Elevation: 925 ft (282 m)

Population (2020)
  - Total: 47,949
  - Density: 3,718/sq mi (1,435.6/km^{2})
- Time zone: UTC−8 (Pacific)
  - Summer (DST): UTC−7 (PDT)
- ZIP Codes: 92679, 92688
- Area code: 949
- FIPS code: 06-59587
- GNIS feature IDs: 1867054, 2411517
- Website: cityofrsm.org

Rancho Santa Margarita (RAN-choh SAN-tuh mar-guh-REE-tuh) is a city in Orange County, California, United States. One of Orange County's youngest cities, Rancho Santa Margarita is a master-planned community. The population was 47,949 at the 2020 census, up from 47,853 at the 2010 census. Although it is named for Rancho Santa Margarita y Las Flores, which was in San Diego County, the city limits fall within the borders of Rancho Mission Viejo. At 20 characters long (22 including spaces), it is the longest city name in California.

== History ==
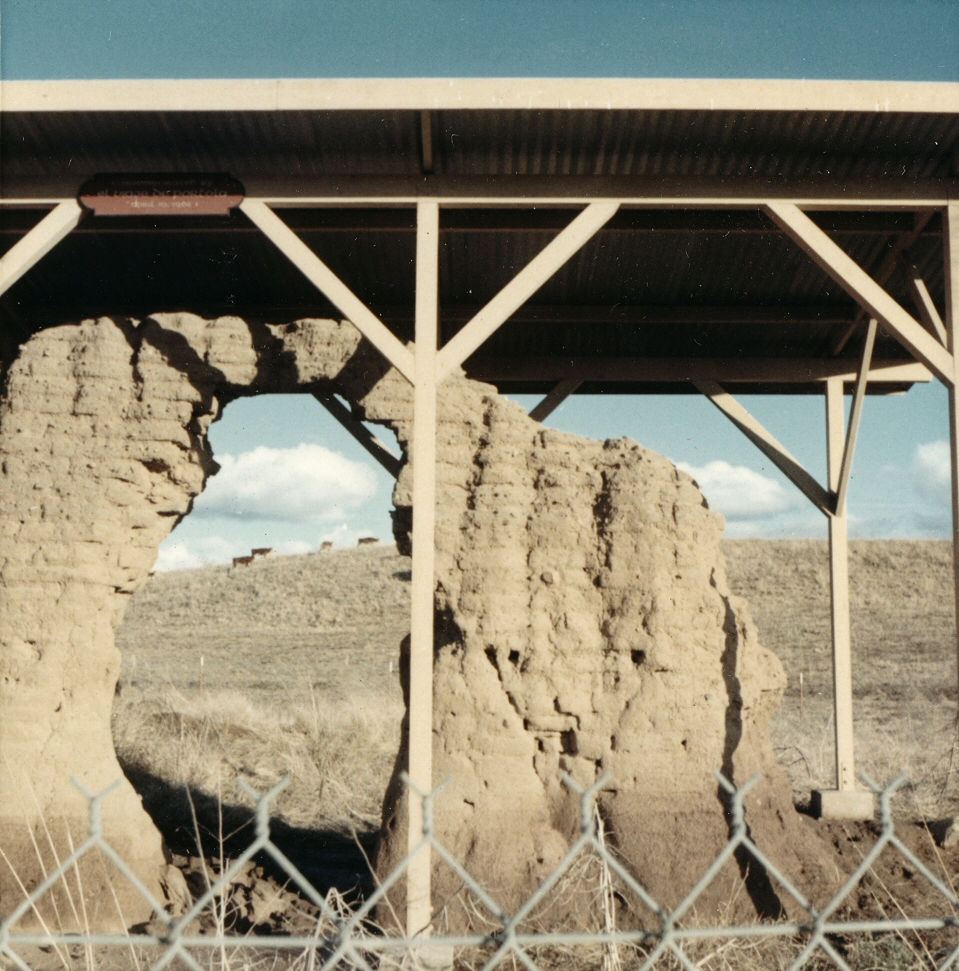
The ruins of the Trabuco Adobe, built by Californios in 1810, at the Acjachemen village of Alume.

The area is the ancestral lands of the Acjachemen people. The village of Alume was located in Rancho Santa Margarita, between Trabuco Creek and Tijeras Creek. In 1810, the Trabuco Adobe was constructed near the village as an outpost of Mission San Juan Capistrano.

The city seal has the brands of Rancho Mission Viejo and Rancho Santa Margarita and Las Flores on the border, with artwork containing Santiago Peak in the background. The tower in the foreground symbolizes the Rancho Santa Margarita Lake Tower.

Hughes Aircraft Company's Microelectronic Systems Division moved to Rancho Santa Margarita in May 1988 from Irvine. In August 1992, the Hughes plant closed its facilities and moved the division to Carlsbad, California due to budget constraints in the aerospace industry.

Rolling Hills Estates had the longest city name in California with 19 letters until January 1, 2000, when the title was ceded to Rancho Santa Margarita (20 letters) upon the latter's incorporation.

The city is a general law city and operates under the council-manager form of government. Rancho Santa Margarita is a contract city. Police services are provided through contract with the Orange County Sheriff. Fire protection services are provided through the Orange County Fire Authority.

== Geography ==
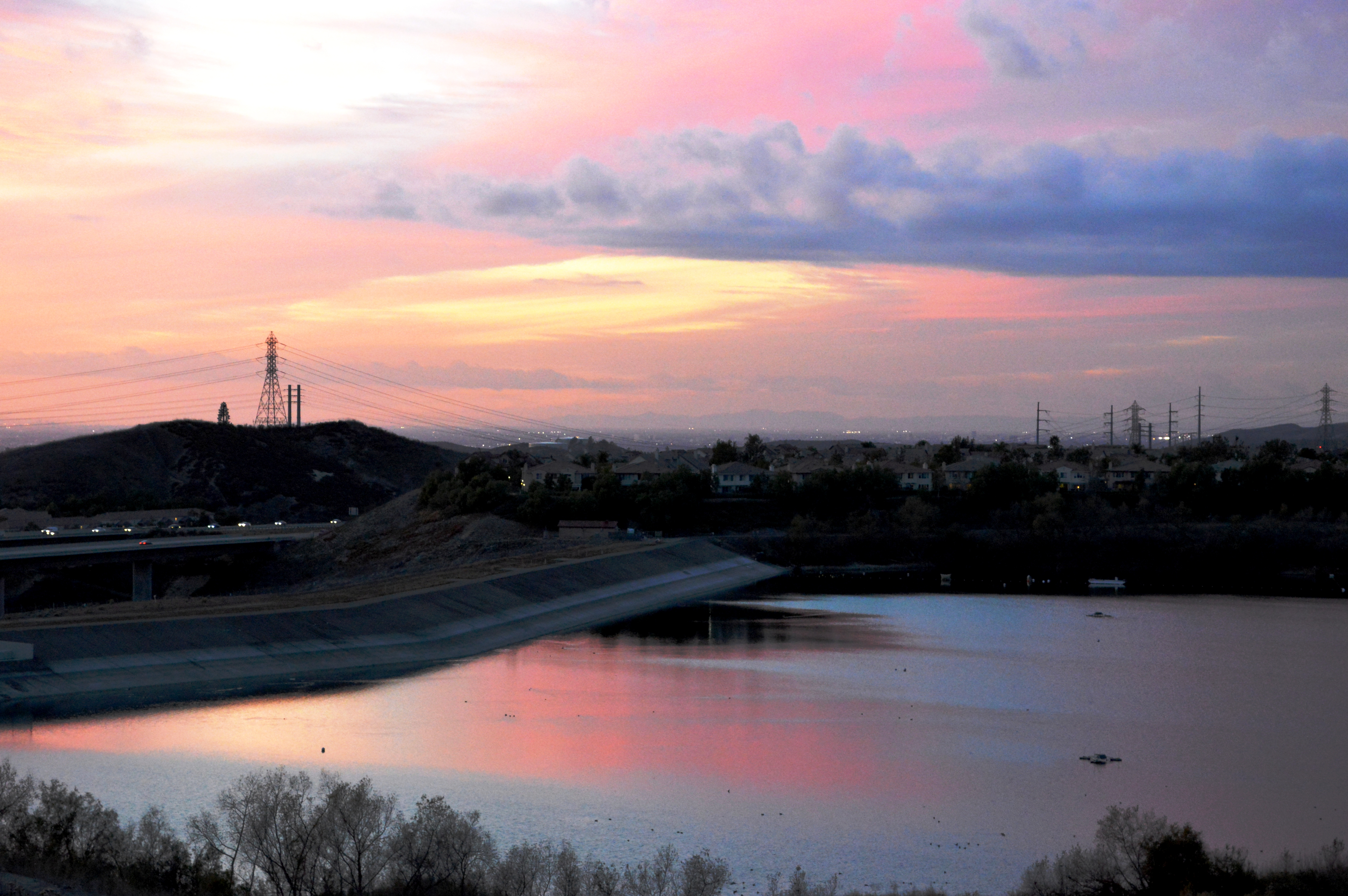
Upper Oso Reservoir.

Rancho Santa Margarita is located at 33°38′29″N 117°35′40″W (33.641518, −117.594524). It occupies much of a high plateau known as Plano Trabuco.

According to the United States Census Bureau, the city has a total area of 13.0 square miles (34 km^{2}), of which 13.0 square miles (34 km^{2}) is land and 0.04 square miles (0.10 km^{2}) (0.27%) is water.

Rancho Santa Margarita is bordered by the city of Mission Viejo on the west, the census-designated places Coto de Caza and Las Flores on the south, the unincorporated Trabuco Canyon on the north, and the Cleveland National Forest on the east.

Vehicular access is provided by California State Route 241 (a toll road), in addition to several surface streets. Santa Margarita Parkway and Antonio Parkway are the city's major thoroughfares, with Avenida De Las Banderas, Avenida Empresa, Avenida De Las Flores, and Alma Aldea being minor thoroughfares. In addition, Alicia Parkway terminates in the city providing access to Mission Viejo.

== Climate ==
Rancho Santa Margarita, like most of southern California, generally has a Mediterranean climate.

== Economy ==
=== Top employers ===
According to the City's 2020 Comprehensive Annual Financial Report, the top 10 employers in the city are:

#	Employer	# of employees
1	Applied Medical	2,700
2	O'Connell Landscape Maintenance	1,000
3	Saddleback Valley Unified School District	288
4	Target	255
5	Lucas & Mercier Construction	250
6	Capistrano Unified School District	215
7	Control Components Inc.	200
8	PADI	180
9	Santa Margarita Catholic High School	175
10	Car Sound Exhaust System	150

== Demographics ==
Historical population
Census	Pop.	Note	%±
1990	11,390		—
2000	47,214		314.5%
2010	47,853		1.4%
2020	47,949		0.2%
U.S. Decennial Census; 1860–1870 1880-1890; 1900 1910 1920; 1930 1940 1950; 1960 1970 1980; 1990 2000 2010; 2020

Rancho Santa Margarita first appeared as a census designated place in the 1990 U.S. census; and as a city in the 2010 U.S. census.

=== Racial and ethnic composition ===
Rancho Santa Margarita city, California – Racial and ethnic composition Note: The US Census treats Hispanic/Latino as an ethnic category. This table excludes Latinos from the racial categories and assigns them to a separate category. Hispanics/Latinos may be of any race.
Race / Ethnicity (NH = Non-Hispanic)	Pop 1990	Pop 2000	Pop 2010	Pop 2020	% 1990	% 2000	% 2010	% 2020
White alone (NH)	8,922	35,132	32,054	27,930	78.33%	74.41%	66.98%	58.25%
Black or African American alone (NH)	155	787	788	761	1.36%	1.67%	1.65%	1.59%
Native American or Alaska Native alone (NH)	56	131	82	73	0.49%	0.28%	0.17%	0.15%
Asian alone (NH)	929	3,440	4,268	5,711	8.16%	7.29%	8.92%	11.91%
Native Hawaiian or Pacific Islander alone (NH)	929	90	88	92	8.16%	0.19%	0.18%	0.19%
Other race alone (NH)	9	91	91	225	0.08%	0.19%	0.19%	0.47%
Mixed race or Multiracial (NH)	x	1,404	1,580	2,860	x	2.97%	3.30%	5.96%
Hispanic or Latino (any race)	1,319	6,139	8,902	10,297	11.58%	13.00%	18.60%	21.47%
Total	11,390	47,214	47,853	47,949	100.00%	100.00%	100.00%	100.00%

=== 2020 census ===
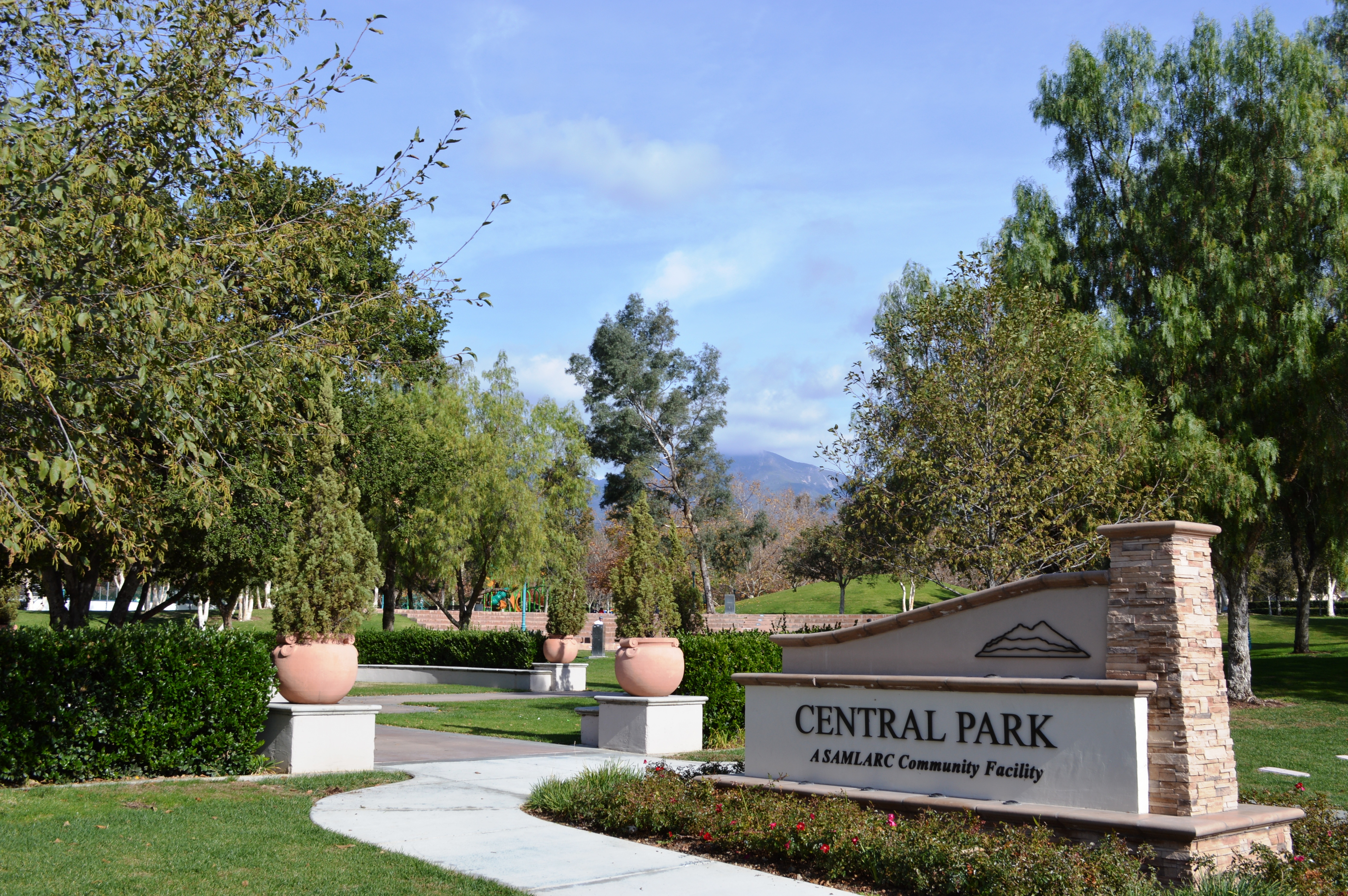
Rancho Santa Margarita Central Park

As of the 2020 census, Rancho Santa Margarita had a population of 47,949. The population density was 3,718.1 inhabitants per square mile (1,435.6/km^{2}). The median age was 40.0 years. For every 100 females, there were 94.7 males, and for every 100 females age 18 and over, there were 91.4 males age 18 and over.

The census reported that 99.9% of the population lived in households, 0.1% lived in non-institutionalized group quarters, and no one was institutionalized. 100.0% of residents lived in urban areas, while 0.0% lived in rural areas.

There were 17,188 households, out of which 37.0% included children under the age of 18, 60.9% were married-couple households, 5.0% were cohabiting couple households, 21.9% had a female householder with no spouse or partner present, and 12.3% had a male householder with no spouse or partner present. 18.5% of households were one-person households, and 6.7% were one-person households with someone aged 65 or older. The average household size was 2.79. There were 13,048 families (75.9% of all households).

The age distribution was 22.8% under the age of 18, 8.8% aged 18 to 24, 25.2% aged 25 to 44, 31.8% aged 45 to 64, and 11.4% who were 65 years of age or older.

There were 17,606 housing units at an average density of 1,365.2 units per square mile (527.1 units/km^{2}), of which 17,188 (97.6%) were occupied. Of these, 69.6% were owner-occupied, and 30.4% were occupied by renters. The homeowner vacancy rate was 0.3%, and the rental vacancy rate was 4.7%.

=== 2023 ACS 5-year estimate ===
In 2023, the US Census Bureau estimated that the median household income was $146,827, and the per capita income was $63,535. About 4.7% of families and 5.1% of the population were below the poverty line.

=== 2010 census ===
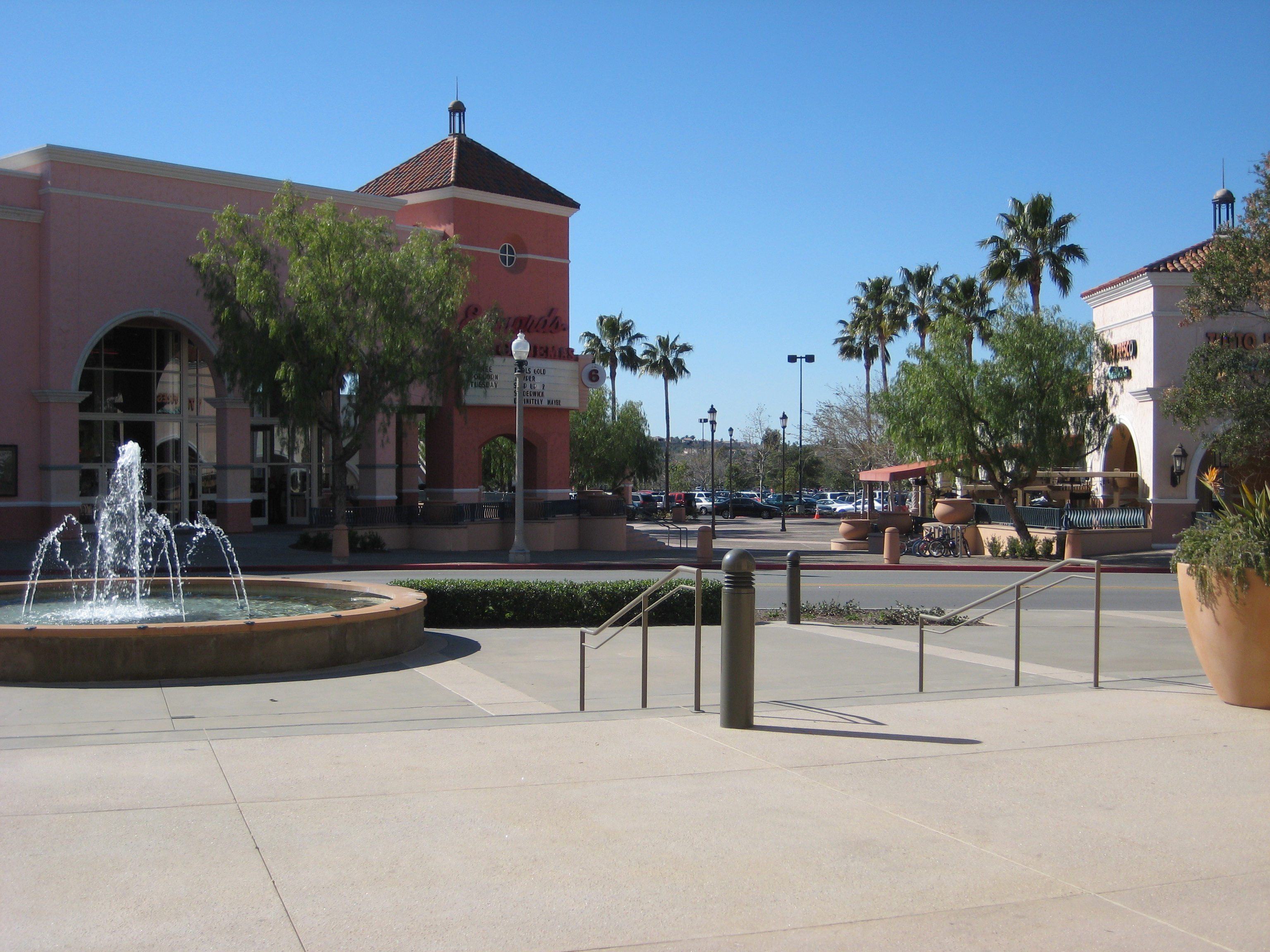
Shops in Rancho Santa Margarita

The 2010 United States census reported that Rancho Santa Margarita had a population of 47,853. The population density was 3,683.1 inhabitants per square mile (1,422.1/km^{2}). The racial makeup of Rancho Santa Margarita was 37,421 (78.2%) White (67.0% Non-Hispanic White), 887 (1.9%) African American, 182 (0.4%) Native American, 4,350 (9.1%) Asian, 102 (0.2%) Pacific Islander, 2,674 (5.6%) from other races, and 2,237 (4.7%) from two or more races. Hispanic or Latino of any race were 8,902 persons (18.6%).

31.8% of the population possessed a bachelor's degree, with 16.4% possessing a Graduate or Professional Degree. The educational attainment level in Rancho Santa Margarita significantly exceeds the averages throughout the rest of California.

The Census reported that 47,851 people (100% of the population) lived in households, 2 (0%) lived in non-institutionalized group quarters, and 0 (0%) were institutionalized.

There were 16,665 households, out of which 7,699 (46.2%) had children under the age of 18 living in them, 10,144 (60.9%) were opposite-sex married couples living together, 1,703 (10.2%) had a female householder with no husband present, 700 (4.2%) had a male householder with no wife present. There were 747 (4.5%) unmarried opposite-sex partnerships, and 103 (0.6%) same-sex married couples or partnerships. 3,199 households (19.2%) were made up of individuals, and 761 (4.6%) had someone living alone who was 65 years of age or older. The average household size was 2.87. There were 12,547 families (75.3% of all households); the average family size was 3.33.

The population was spread out, with 13,879 people (29.0%) under the age of 18, 3,793 people (7.9%) aged 18 to 24, 13,706 people (28.6%) aged 25 to 44, 13,764 people (28.8%) aged 45 to 64, and 2,711 people (5.7%) who were 65 years of age or older. The median age was 36.0 years. For every 100 females, there were 95.6 males. For every 100 females age 18 and over, there were 92.1 males.

There were 17,260 housing units at an average density of 1,328.4 per square mile (512.9/km^{2}), of which 11,906 (71.4%) were owner-occupied, and 4,759 (28.6%) were occupied by renters. The homeowner vacancy rate was 1.2%; the rental vacancy rate was 5.6%. 35,737 people (74.7% of the population) lived in owner-occupied housing units and 12,114 people (25.3%) lived in rental housing units.

=== 2009–2013 estimate ===
During 2009–2013, Rancho Santa Margarita had a median household income of $104,113, with 3.9% of the population living below the federal poverty line.

== Government and politics ==
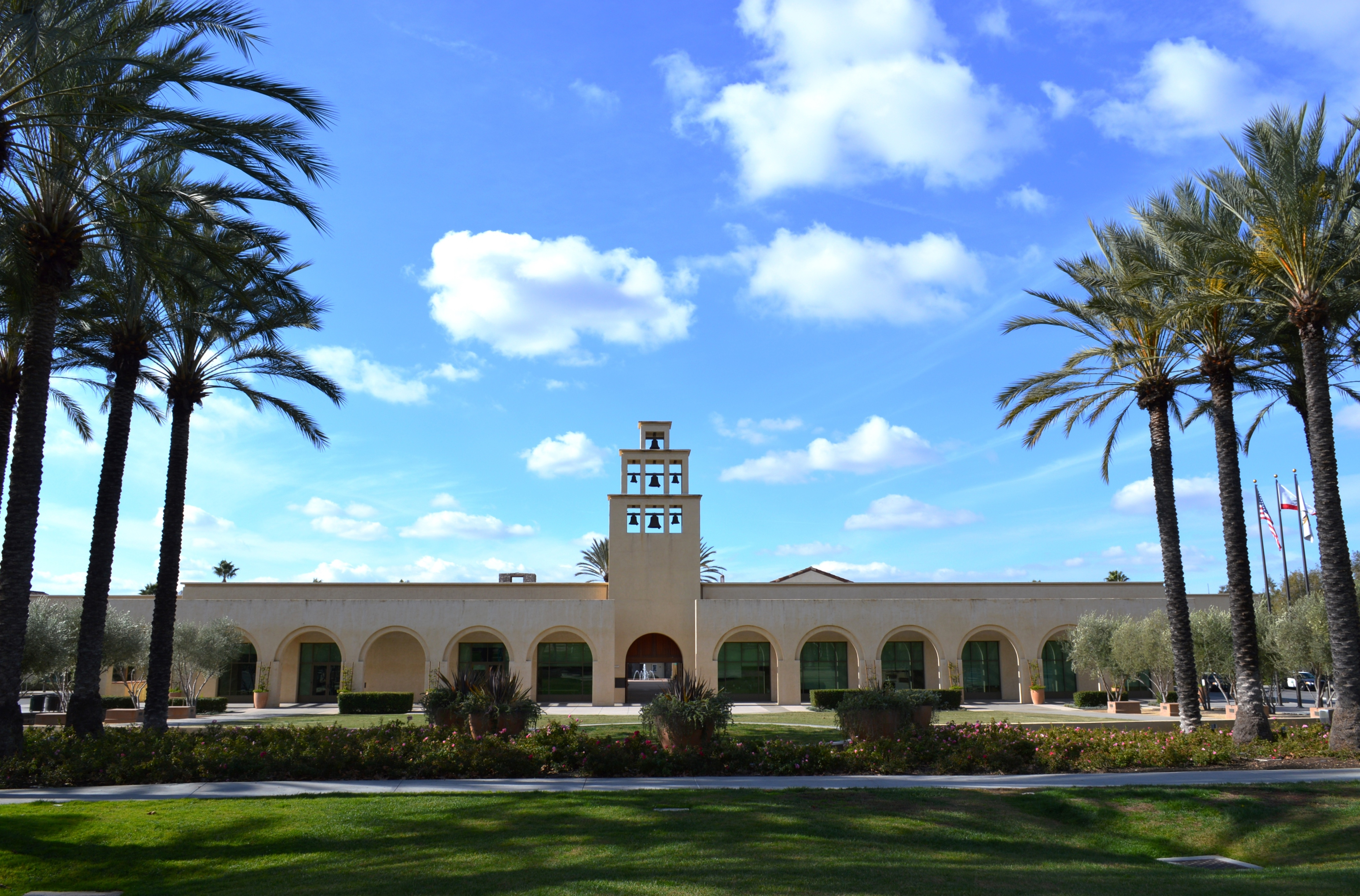
Rancho Santa Margarita City Hall.

=== State and federal representation ===
In the California State Legislature, Rancho Santa Margarita is in the 38th senatorial district, represented by Democrat Catherine Blakespear, and in the 71st Assembly district, represented by Republican Kate Sanchez.

In the United States House of Representatives, Rancho Santa Margarita is in California's 40th congressional district, represented by Republican Young Kim.

According to the California Secretary of State, as of February 10, 2019, Rancho Santa Margarita has 28,462 registered voters. Of those, 11,877 (41.73%) are registered Republicans, 7,511 (26.39%) are registered Democrats, and 7,819 (27.47%) have no political party preference/are independents.

Rancho Santa Margarita has voted Republican in every presidential election since the city's incorporation.

== Education ==
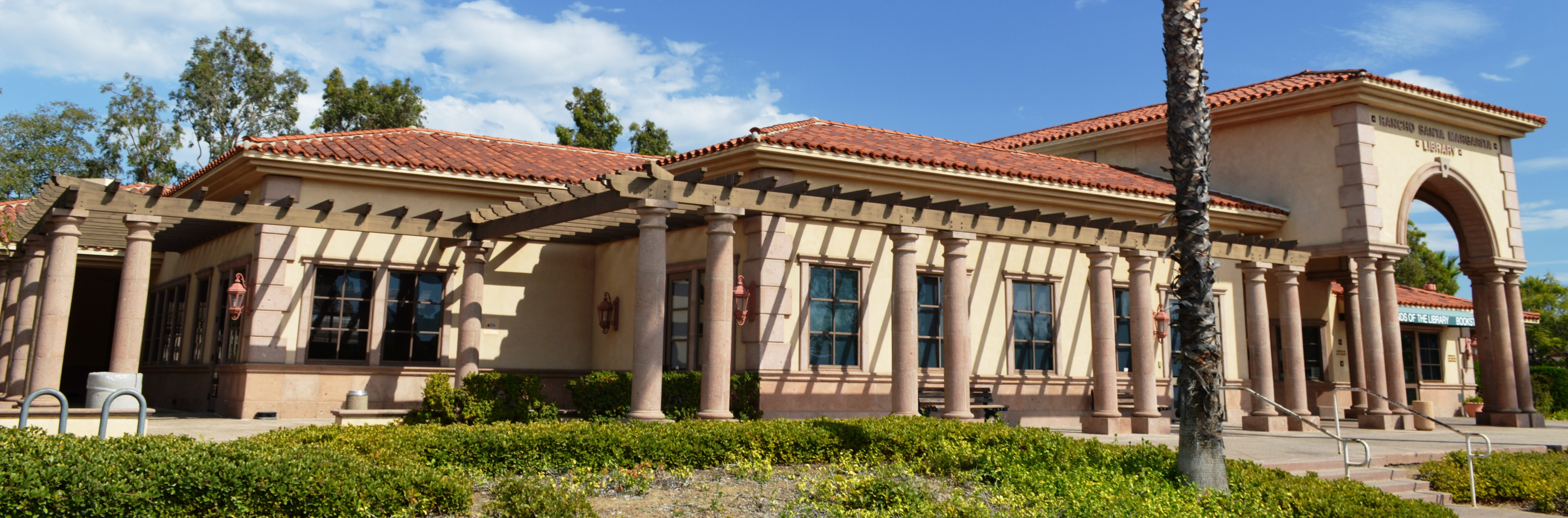
Rancho Santa Margarita Library

The city is served by Saddleback Valley Unified School District and the Capistrano Unified School District.

- Students in SVUSD boundaries attend Trabuco Hills High School or Mission Viejo High School, both outside of Rancho Santa Margarita in the city of Mission Viejo. Students in CUSD boundaries attend Tesoro High School located in the Las Flores neighborhood.
- Rancho Santa Margarita Intermediate School (SVUSD) and Las Flores Middle School (CUSD) serve the city.
- Public Elementary schools include Cielo Vista, Trabuco Mesa, Robinson Ranch, Arroyo Vista, Melinda Heights, and Tijeras Creek.
- Private Elementary and Middle Schools include St. John's Episcopal Day School, Serra Catholic, and Mission Hills Christian School.
- Santa Margarita Catholic High School is a private Roman Catholic high school associated with the Catholic Diocese of Orange. SMCHS is located in Rancho Santa Margarita.

== Popular culture ==
=== Television ===
The television series The Real Housewives of Orange County, although based in Coto de Caza, is mainly filmed in Rancho Santa Margarita where many of the housewives do business, shopping, commuting, dentistry, and dining.

The Dove Canyon, Rancho Cielo, and Robinson Ranch neighborhoods, while all part of the city, have a ZIP Code of 92679, although the 92688 ZIP Code is far more common in the Rancho Santa Margarita area.

A map of Orange County seen in season four of Arrested Development places the fictional Bluth Company–developed community of Sudden Valley northeast of Mission Viejo and Las Flores, in the approximate location of Rancho Santa Margarita.

== Notable people ==
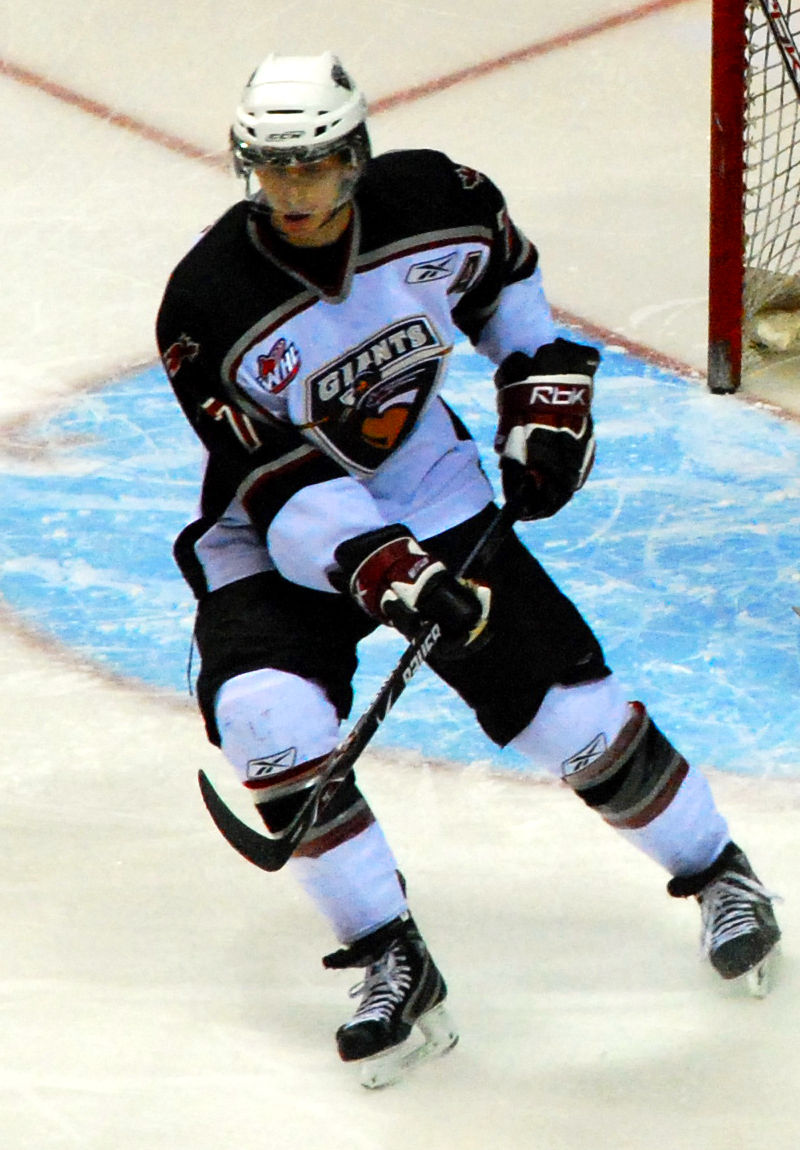
Jonathon Blum

- Jonathon Blum (born 1989), National Hockey League player, 2018 Winter Olympian
- Joy Fawcett, Olympic soccer gold medalist
- Joshua Fuentes, MLB player
- Warren G, rapper and producer
- Members of the band Movements.
- Carson Palmer, American football player; attended Santa Margarita Catholic High School
- The plaintiffs and alleged wrongful death victim in Raine v. OpenAI
- Mark Sanchez (born 1986), National Football League quarterback
- Teemu Selänne, ice hockey player
- Klay Thompson, basketball player; attended Santa Margarita Catholic High School
- Velvet Revolver, rock band

== See also ==
- Coto De Caza
