= UCI Medical Center Irvine–Newport =

- UC Irvine Health

Geography
- Location: Irvine, California, United States

Organization
- Care system: Private
- Affiliated university: University of California, Irvine

Services
- Emergency department: Yes
- Beds: 144

History
- Opened: 2024

Links
- Website: ucihealth.org/irvine-medical-center
- Lists: Hospitals in California

UCI Medical Center Irvine–Newport is an acute care, ambulatory care, and cancer research facility on the northern end of the University of California, Irvine campus. The center will be a part of the larger Presidential Gateway, a 202-acre area of the campus that will also house therapeutic gardens, nature trails, and a research preserve. The construction of the hospital will bring UCI Health urgent care services onto the main campus for the first time, as the original UCI Medical Center is located 13 miles away in Orange.

The hospital will feature a 24-hour emergency department as well as neurosurgery, neurology, oncology, and orthopedic programs. The costs for the facility's construction are expected to exceed US$1,000,000,000 and the estimated completion date is 2025. The project is funded by private donors and has not yet achieved its funding goal.

== Background ==
The 168,000 square feet (15,600 m^{2}) Joe C. Wen & Family Center for Advance Care, the campus's specialty outpatient care facility, was constructed for $221 million and was the first of three buildings to open. The building has 120 exam rooms. The building includes an autism and neurodevelopmental disorder center on the first floor, a Children's Hospital of Orange County center on the second floor, adult primary and specialty care on the third floor, and neuroscience and orthopedic services on the fourth floor.

The Chao Family Comprehensive Cancer Center and Ambulatory Care building will open in July 2024. The campus's largest building, a 144-bed acute care and emergency room facility, will open in 2025.

== History ==
The University of California, Irvine Board of Regents voted to approve construction of the facility on January 21, 2021. UCI officials broke ground on the construction site on November 15, 2021. In June 2022, the project received a $20 million donation from Joe C. Wen, a businessman based in Cypress, California.

On April 30, 2024, the Joe C. Wen & Family Center for Advanced Care opened to the public as the first of three parts on the hospital campus to open. Approximately 500 patients visited the center on its first day. Upon the opening, UC Irvine also announced a July 2024 opening date for the Chao Family Comprehensive Cancer Center and Ambulatory Care building, and maintained its expected 2025 opening date for the main acute care and emergency room building.
