= Chasan =

Chasan may refer to:

== People ==
- Fred Chasan – American surgeon
- Mark Chasan – American businessman
- Roslyn Chasan – American attorney

== Other ==
- Chasan (grape) – wine grape variety grown primarily in the Languedoc wine region of southern France
- Chasan (pastry) – traditional Chinese pastry that is popular in the Jiangs province and especially in Huai'an, a historic city which is considered the home of the pastry
