= Western Journal of Emergency Medicine =

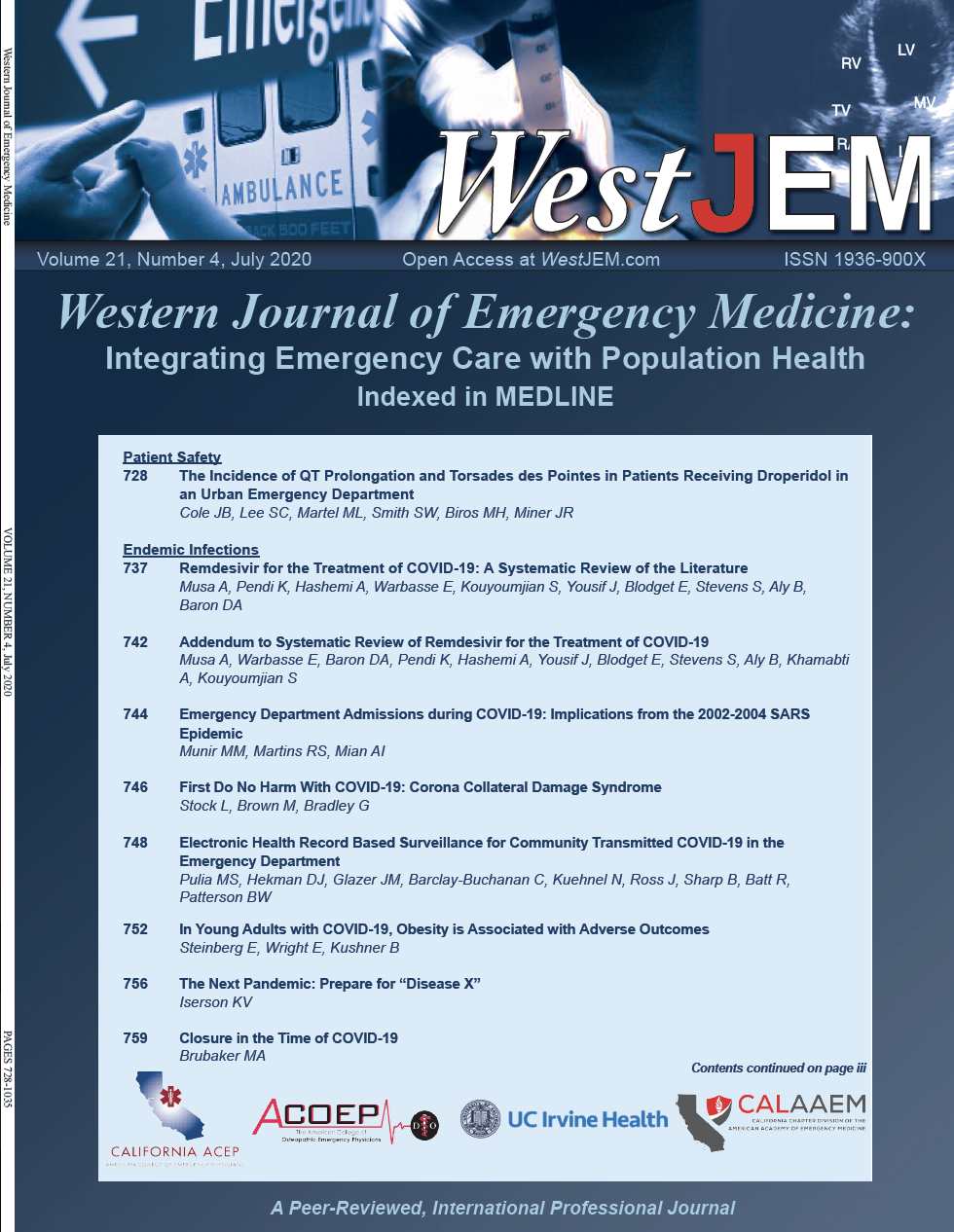
- Western Journal of Emergency Medicine home page
- Discipline: Emergency medicine
- Language: English
- Edited by: Mark I. Langdorf

Publication details
- Former name: The California Journal of Emergency Medicine
- History: 2000–present
- Publisher: eScholarship (United States)
- Frequency: Bimonthly
- Open access: Yes
- License: Creative Commons Attribution License
- Impact factor: 3.988 (2021)

Standard abbreviations
- ISO 4: West. J. Emerg. Med.

Indexing
- ISSN: 1936-900X (print); 1936-9018 (web)

Links
- Journal homepage

The Western Journal of Emergency Medicine: Integrating Emergency Care with Population Health, (WestJEM) is a bimonthly peer-reviewed, fully open access medical journal.

WestJEM focuses on how the systems and delivery of emergency care affect health, health disparities, and health outcomes in communities and populations worldwide, including the impact of social conditions on the composition of patients seeking care in emergency departments. It is published by the University of California's California Digital Library through eScholarship, on behalf of the University of California, Irvine Department of Emergency Medicine.

The current editor-in-chief is Mark I. Langdorf, MD, MHPE, Professor of Clinical Emergency Medicine in the University California, Irvine School of Medicine.

The current Managing Associate Editor is Shahram Lotfipour, MD Professor of Clinical Emergency Medicine and Public Health at the University California, Irvine School of Medicine.

WestJEM is the official journal of California chapter of the American College of Emergency Physicians (ACEP), the American College of Osteopathic Emergency Physicians (ACOEP) and the California chapter division of the American Academy of Emergency Medicine (AAEM). WestJEM actively supports scholarly publishing from junior faculty by devoting additional space, consideration and editorial support. The journal is supported by some 80 academic departments of emergency medicine in the US.

== Journal Distribution ==
WestJEM Circulation: 19,000 electronic, 2,800 print

Pageviews and downloads: 250,000 per month/3 million per year

== Abstracting and indexing ==
- Clarivate Analytics' (formerly Thomson Reuters') Science Citation Index Expanded
- Scopus
- Index Medicus/MEDLINE/PubMed
- PubMed Central
- Europe PubMed Central Full-Text
- Directory of Open Access Journals Abstracts
- Google Scholar Full-Text
- HINARI Access to Research in Health Programme
- Embase (Elsevier)
- EBSCO/CINAHL

== Impact Factor and Journal Ranking ==
- Clarivate Analytics (previously Thomson Reuters) 2-year Impact Factor: 3.988
  - 14/31 in category worldwide, and 6th among general emergency medicine journals
- Scimago Journal and Country Rank Index (SJR 2021): 10/94 emergency medicine journals (cites/doc; 3 years) and 5th among general emergency medicine journals
- Scopus CiteScore (2021): 3.7, which places 18/90 emergency medicine journals, and 9th among general emergency medicine journals worldwide
- Altmetric social media ranking 6/35 emergency medicine journals

== Affiliated Journals ==
Yearly Special Issue on Education Research and Practice, sponsored by the Council of Emergency Medicine Residency Directors (CORD) and the Clerkship Directors in Emergency Medicine

- Guest Editors Jeff Love, MD, Georgetown University and Douglas Ander, MD, Emory University.

Clinical Practice and Cases in Emergency Medicine (CPC-EM)

- Case reports, Case series, and Images
- Indexed in PubMed and PubMed Central
- Editor in Chief: Rick McPheeters, DO, Kern Medical
- https://westjem.com/cpc_em

Mediterranean Journal of Emergency Medicine and Acute Care

- Editor in Chief: Amin A. Kazzi, MD, American University of Beirut, Lebanon
- https://www.medjem.me/
