= CWT =

cwt is the abbreviation for hundredweight (cwt = centum weight), an English, imperial, and US customary unit of weight.

CWT or cwt may also refer to:

== Enterprises and organizations ==
- CWT (company), formerly Carlson Wagonlit Travel, a travel management company
- Cadwalader, Wickersham & Taft, a New York law firm
- California Water Service Group, a public utility (NYSE ticker symbol: CWT)
- Changing World Technologies, a synthetic fuel company
- Cheshire Wildlife Trust, an English charity
- Colorado Water Trust, an American non-profit
- Cooperatives Working Together, an American dairy organization
- Cornwall Wildlife Trust, an English charity
- Tanzania Teachers' Union (Swahili: Chama cha Walimu Tanzania)

== Science and technology ==
- Center wing fuel tank (CWT), a crucial airplane structure that contributed to the crash of TWA Flight 800
- Coded wire tag, an animal tagging device
- Complex wavelet transform, an extension to the standard discrete wavelet transform used in image processing
- Constant with temperature, a term used in bandgap voltage reference
- Continuous wavelet transform, a formal representation of a signal in mathematics
- CBOR Web Token, a proposed Internet standard for encoding JSON Web Token-style tokens in binary form

== Other uses ==
- Kwatay language, spoken in Senegal (ISO 639 code: cwt)
- Cowra Airport, New South Wales, Australia (IATA code: CWT)
- Central Western Time, an Australian time zone
- Chief Water Tender, a former paygrade for a watertender in the U.S. Navy
- Constant weight, a freediving discipline
