= CWTS =

CWTS may refer to:

- NASCAR Camping World Truck Series, a pickup truck racing series in the United States
- Civic Welfare Training Service, a component of the National Service Training Program of the Philippines
- CWTS Leiden Ranking, an annual global university ranking
- Centre for Science and Technology Studies (CWTS), a research center located at Leiden University in the Netherlands
- Cold Weather Testing Station, a stage in the development of the Canadian turbojet Avro Canada Chinook
- China Wireless Telecommunication Standards working Group (CWTS), part of the Standardization Administration of China
- Civil War Token Society, an organization involved in collecting Exonumia
- Christian Workers Training School, a precursor to Bacolod Christian College of Negros in the Philippines

== See also ==
- CWT (disambiguation)
