= Mission Viejo, California =

City in California, United States

- City
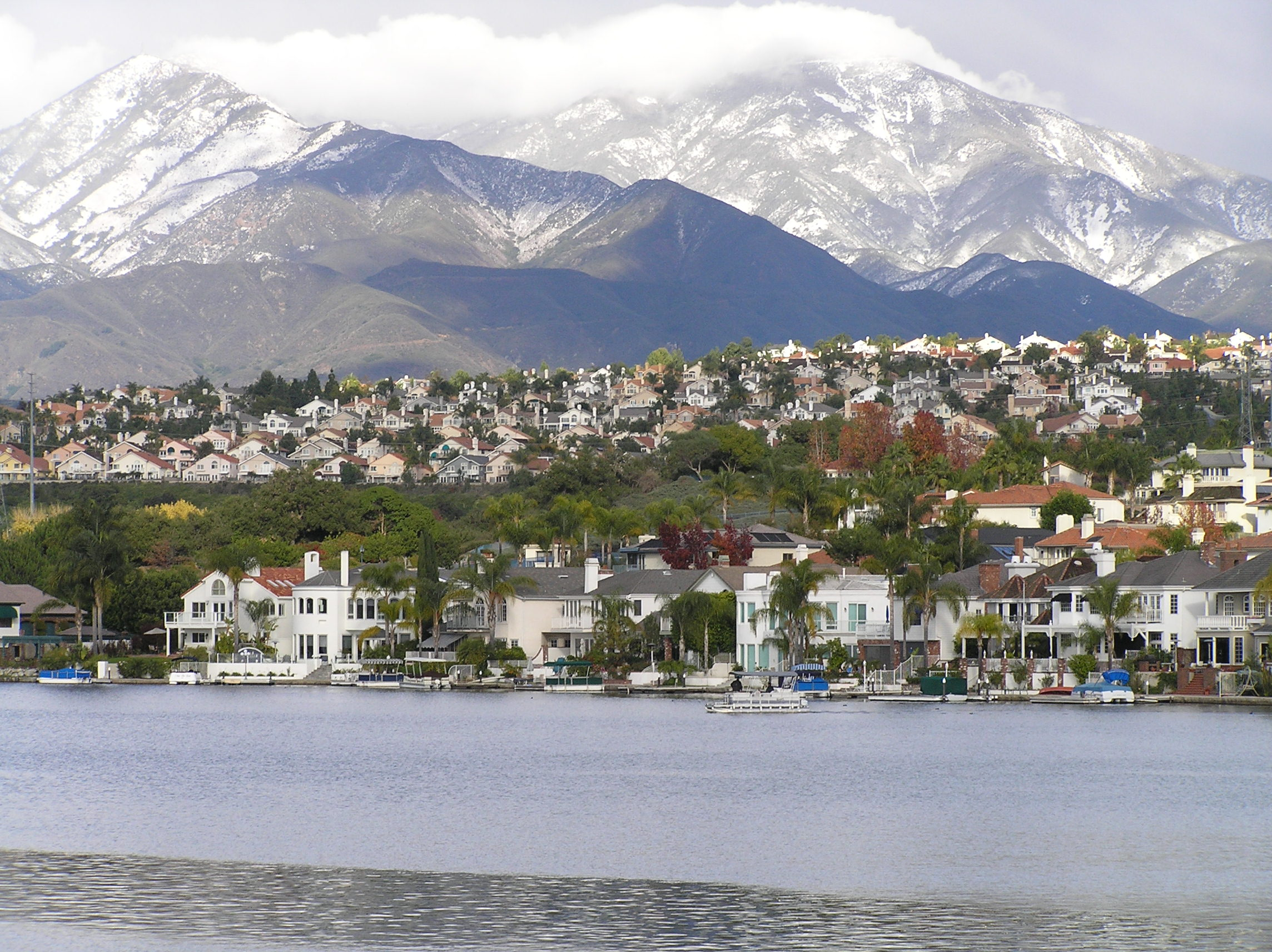
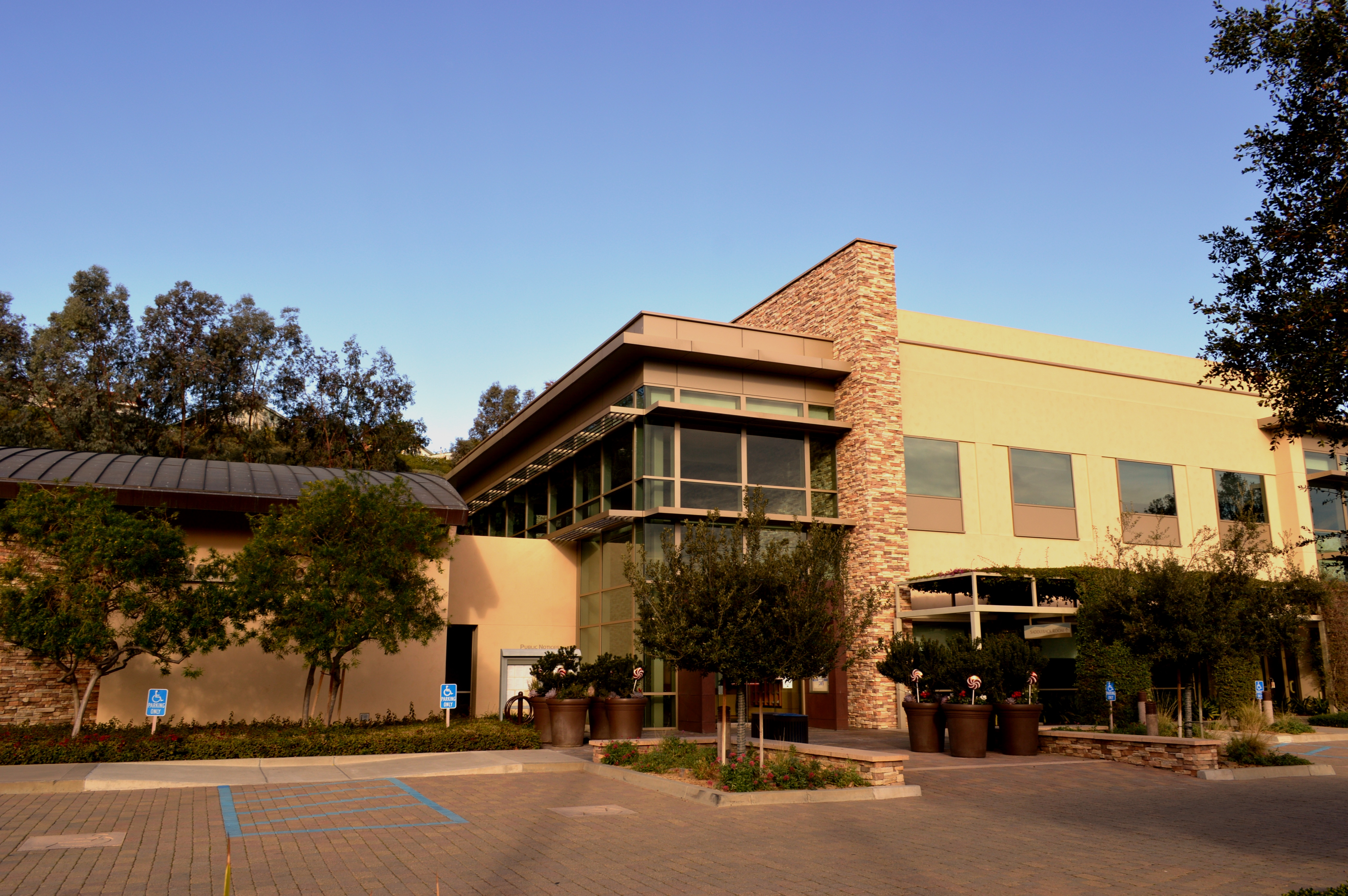
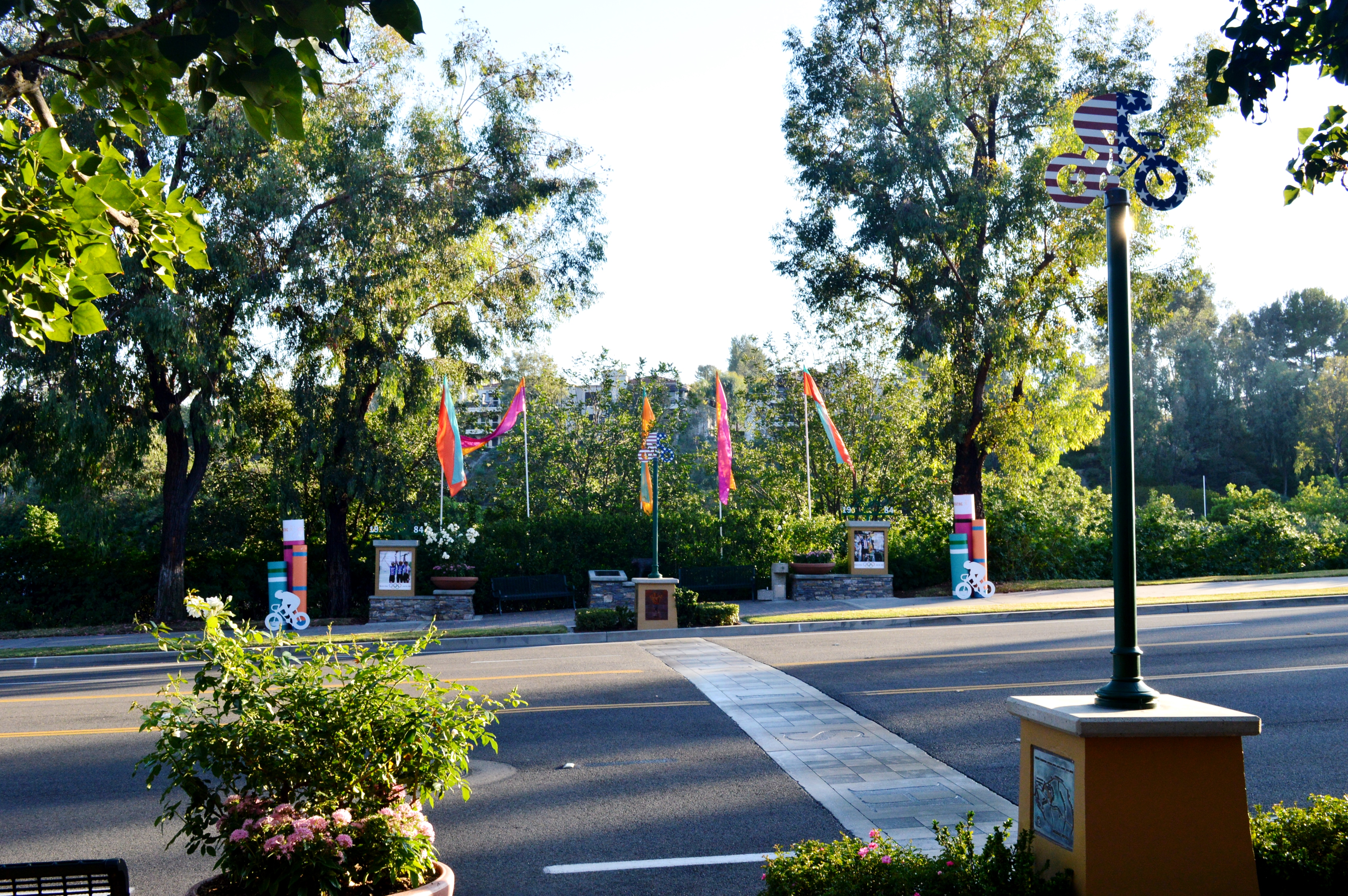
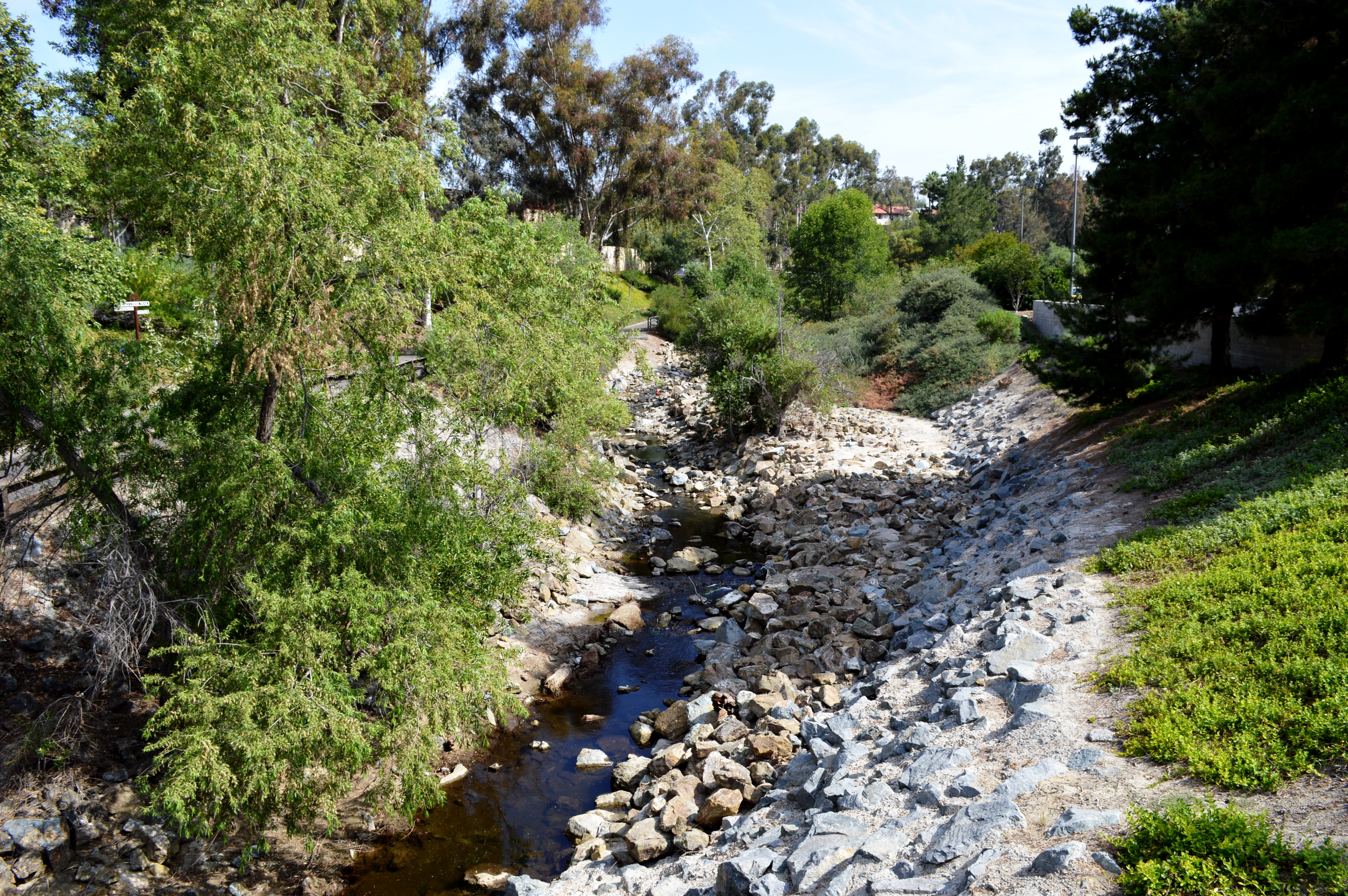
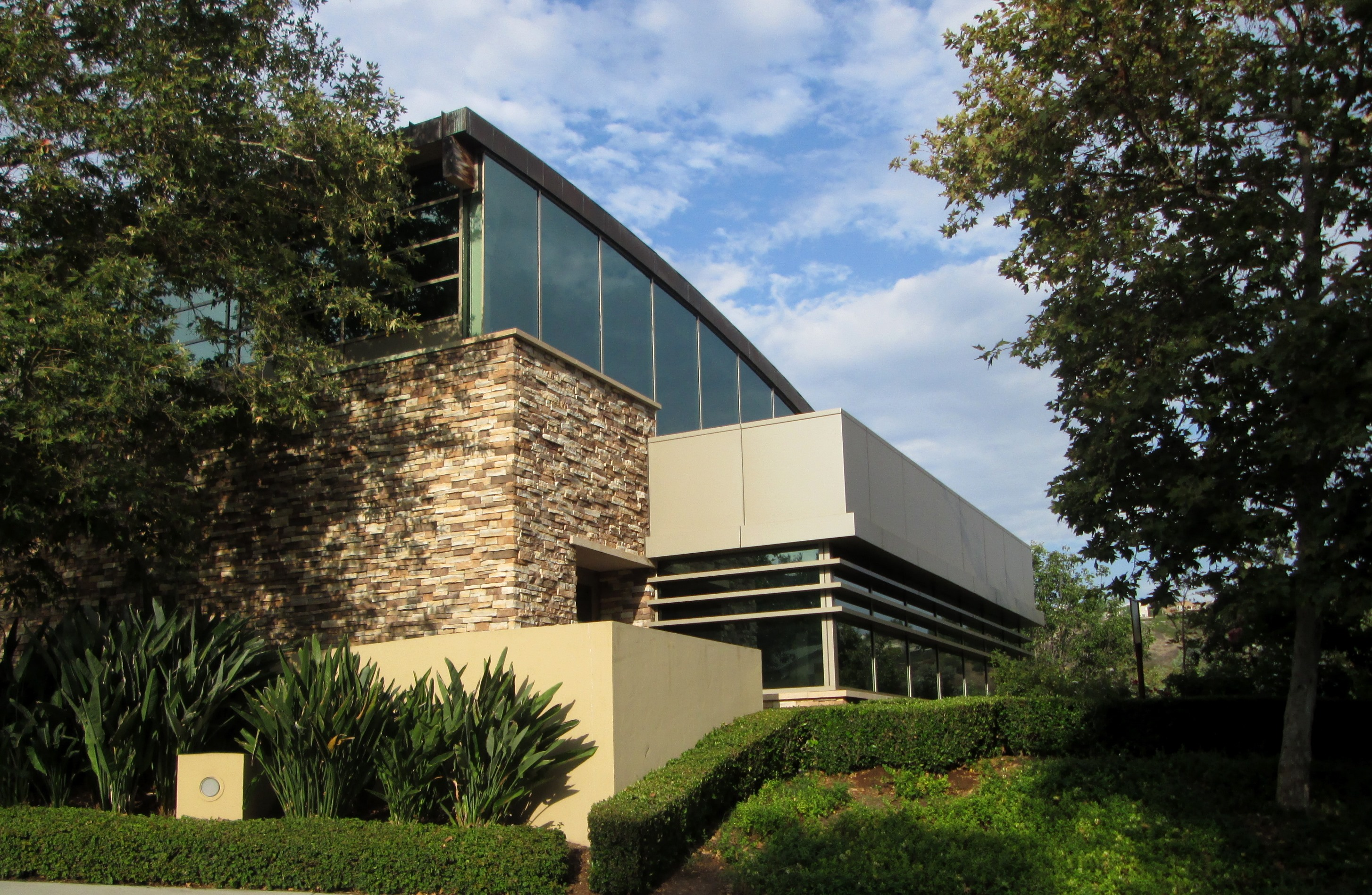
- Clockwise from top: Lake Mission Viejo, Olympiad Rd, Mission Viejo Library, Oso Creek, Mission Viejo City Hall

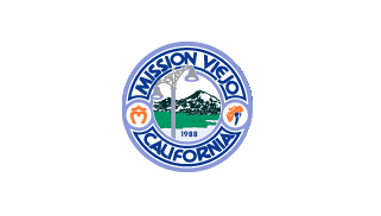
- Flag Seal
- Motto: "Make Living Your Mission"
- Interactive map of Mission Viejo, California
- Location within the Los Angeles Metropolitan Area Location within the State of California Location within the contiguous United States
- Coordinates: 33°35′49″N 117°39′30″W
- Country: United States
- State: California
- County: Orange
- Incorporated: March 31, 1988

Government
  - Type: Council-Manager
  - Mayor: Wendy Bucknum
  - Mayor Pro Tem: Brian Goodell
  - City Council: Bob Ruesch; Trish Kelley; Cynthia Vasquez
  - City Manager: Elaine Lister

Area
  - City: 18.03 sq mi (46.70 km^{2})
  - Land: 17.66 sq mi (45.74 km^{2})
  - Water: 0.37 sq mi (0.96 km^{2}) 2.05%
- Elevation: 410 ft (125 m)

Population (2020)
  - City: 93,653
  - Rank: 86th in California
  - Density: 5,303.0/sq mi (2,047.51/km^{2})
  - Urban: 646,843 (US: 65th)
  - Urban density: 3,953/sq mi (1,526.3/km^{2})
- Time zone: UTC-8 (PST)
  - Summer (DST): UTC-7 (PDT)
- ZIP codes: 92691–92692, 92694
- Area code: 949
- FIPS code: 06-48256
- GNIS feature IDs: 1661045, 2411123
- Website: www.missionviejo.gov

Mission Viejo (/viˈeɪhoʊ/ vee-AY-hoh; corruption of Misión Vieja [miˈsjon ˈbjexa]; Spanish for 'Old Mission') is a commuter city in the Saddleback Valley in Orange County, California, United States. Mission Viejo is considered one of the largest master-planned communities ever built under a single project in the United States and is rivaled only by Highlands Ranch, Colorado in size. Its population as of 2020 was 93,653.

Mission Viejo is suburban in nature and culture, and consists of residential properties, offices and businesses. The city is noted for its tree-lined neighborhoods, receiving recognition from the National Arbor Day Foundation. The city's name is a reference to Rancho Mission Viejo, a large Spanish land grant from which the community was founded.

The United States Census Bureau defines an urban area of Orange County cities not part of Los Angeles's urban area with Mission Viejo as the principal city: the Mission Viejo–Lake Forest–Laguna Niguel, CA urban area had a population of 646,843 as of the 2020 census, ranked 65th in the United States.

== History ==
Rancho Mission Viejo was purchased by Don Juan Forster, an English-born Mexican ranchero. During the Mexican–American War, Forster provided fresh horses to United States military forces which were used on the march of San Diego to invade Los Angeles.

Mission Viejo was a hilly region primarily used as cattle and sheep grazing land, since it was of little use to farmers. This city was one of the last regions of Orange County to be urbanized due to its geologic complexity. In 1960, early developers dismissed most of the land in Mission Viejo as simply "undevelopable".

Donald Bren, an urban planner who later became the president of the Irvine Company, drafted a master plan which placed roads in the valleys and houses on the hills, and contoured to the geography of the area. The plan worked, and by 1980 much of the city of Mission Viejo was completed. During the late 1970s and the 1980s, houses in Mission Viejo were in such high demand that housing tracts often sold out before construction even began on them. The houses and shopping centers in the city are almost uniformly designed in a Spanish mission style, with "adobe"-like stucco walls and barrel-tile roofs. Many point to Mission Viejo as the first and largest manifestation of Bren's obsession with Spanish architecture. Bren's company was also the creator of the developments in Irvine and Newport Beach. The company expanded its operations and went on to build the Lakes project in Tempe, Arizona and Mission Viejo Aurora, and was the initial master planner of Highlands Ranch, both located in the Denver, Colorado Metropolitan area.

== Geography ==
According to the United States Census Bureau, the city has a total area of 18.0 square miles (47 km^{2}), 17.7 square miles (46 km^{2}) of which is land and 0.4 square miles (1.0 km^{2}) (2.05%) is water. A significant portion of the surface water is held in Lake Mission Viejo, an artificial lake stretching approximately one mile from Olympiad Road to Alicia Parkway along Marguerite Parkway.

Mission Viejo is located 49 mi (79 km) southeast of Los Angeles, and 73 mi (117 km) northwest of San Diego. It is bordered by Lake Forest on the northwest, Trabuco Canyon on the northeast, Rancho Santa Margarita and Ladera Ranch on the east, San Juan Capistrano on the south, and Laguna Niguel and Laguna Hills on the west.

=== Climate ===
Mission Viejo enjoys a borderline semi-arid/Mediterranean climate (Köppen climate classification BSh/Csa), with mild temperatures and plentiful sunshine year-round. Rainfall totals, which average around 14 inches (360 millimetres) annually are focused primarily in the months from November to March. Summer is very dry and virtually rainless. Due to the city's proximity to the ocean, nighttime and morning clouds are fairly common, especially in May and June, a weather phenomenon commonly known as June Gloom or May Gray.

Like most of Southern California, the city is prone to dry Santa Ana winds, bringing hot air from inland and punctuating the normally mild temperatures with noticeable jumps. For example, temperatures have reached highs of 90 °F (32 °C) and above throughout many months of the year, occasionally into autumn. From 2012 to 2016, California experienced the worst drought in a century. In 2016, California experienced more rainfall than expected and ended most of the drought. Orange County was the last to have drought restrictions lifted.

Climate data for Mission Viejo, California
| Month | Jan | Feb | Mar | Apr | May | Jun | Jul | Aug | Sep | Oct | Nov | Dec | Year |
|---|---|---|---|---|---|---|---|---|---|---|---|---|---|
| Mean daily maximum °F (°C) | 68 (20) | 68 (20) | 69 (21) | 72 (22) | 73 (23) | 75 (24) | 79 (26) | 80 (27) | 80 (27) | 77 (25) | 72 (22) | 67 (19) | 73 (23) |
| Mean daily minimum °F (°C) | 44 (7) | 45 (7) | 47 (8) | 50 (10) | 54 (12) | 58 (14) | 61 (16) | 60 (16) | 59 (15) | 54 (12) | 48 (9) | 43 (6) | 52 (11) |
| Average precipitation inches (mm) | 2.85 (72) | 3.42 (87) | 1.96 (50) | .88 (22) | .25 (6.4) | .11 (2.8) | .06 (1.5) | .03 (0.76) | .25 (6.4) | .65 (17) | 1.09 (28) | 2.38 (60) | 13.93 (354) |
Source: Weather Channel

== Demographics ==
Historical population
| Census | Pop. | Note | %± |
|---|---|---|---|
| 1970 | 11,933 | | — |
| 1980 | 50,666 | | 324.6% |
| 1990 | 72,820 | | 43.7% |
| 2000 | 93,102 | | 27.9% |
| 2010 | 93,305 | | 0.2% |
| 2020 | 93,653 | | 0.4% |
U.S. Decennial Census; 1860–1870 1880-1890; 1900 1910 1920; 1930 1940 1950; 1960 1970 1980; 1990 2000 2010; 2020

Mission Viejo first appeared as an unincorporated community in the 1970 U.S. census; and was designated as a census-designated place in the 1980 United States census. After incorporation, it appeared as a city in the 1990 U.S. census.

=== Racial and ethnic composition ===
Mission Viejo, California – Racial and ethnic composition Note: the US Census treats Hispanic/Latino as an ethnic category. This table excludes Latinos from the racial categories and assigns them to a separate category. Hispanics/Latinos may be of any race.
| Race / Ethnicity (NH = Non-Hispanic) | Pop 1980 | Pop 1990 | Pop 2000 | Pop 2010 | Pop 2020 | % 1980 | % 1990 | % 2000 | % 2010 | % 2020 |
|---|---|---|---|---|---|---|---|---|---|---|
| White alone (NH) | 45,336 | 61,902 | 70,735 | 64,276 | 57,790 | 89.48% | 85.01% | 75.98% | 68.89% | 61.71% |
| Black or African American alone (NH) | 485 | 658 | 1,032 | 1,129 | 1,134 | 0.96% | 0.90% | 1.11% | 1.21% | 1.21% |
| Native American or Alaska Native alone (NH) | 252 | 176 | 204 | 176 | 117 | 0.50% | 0.24% | 0.22% | 0.19% | 0.12% |
| Asian alone (NH) | 1,661 | 4,410 | 7,085 | 8,312 | 10,822 | 3.28% | 6.06% | 7.61% | 8.91% | 11.56% |
| Native Hawaiian or Pacific Islander alone (NH) | 1,661 | 4,410 | 159 | 146 | 152 | 3.28% | 6.06% | 0.17% | 0.16% | 0.16% |
| Other race alone (NH) | 94 | 59 | 148 | 201 | 454 | 0.19% | 0.08% | 0.16% | 0.22% | 0.48% |
| Mixed race or Multiracial (NH) | x | x | 2,473 | 3,188 | 5,198 | x | x | 2.66% | 3.42% | 5.55% |
| Hispanic or Latino (any race) | 2,838 | 5,615 | 11,266 | 15,877 | 17,986 | 5.60% | 7.71% | 12.10% | 17.02% | 19.20% |
| Total | 50,666 | 72,820 | 93,102 | 93,305 | 93,653 | 100.00% | 100.00% | 100.00% | 100.00% | 100.00% |

=== 2020 census ===
As of the 2020 census, Mission Viejo had a population of 93,653. The median age was 45.9 years. 18.8% of residents were under the age of 18 and 21.4% of residents were 65 years of age or older. For every 100 females there were 94.1 males, and for every 100 females age 18 and over there were 91.3 males age 18 and over.

100.0% of residents lived in urban areas, while 0.0% lived in rural areas.

There were 34,072 households in Mission Viejo, of which 29.0% had children under the age of 18 living in them. Of all households, 61.2% were married-couple households, 12.1% were households with a male householder and no spouse or partner present, and 22.3% were households with a female householder and no spouse or partner present. About 19.3% of all households were made up of individuals and 10.6% had someone living alone who was 65 years of age or older.

There were 34,982 housing units, of which 2.6% were vacant. The homeowner vacancy rate was 0.5% and the rental vacancy rate was 5.3%.

The Mission Viejo–Lake Forest–Laguna Niguel, CA urban area had a population of 646,843 as of 2020, making it the 65th most populous in the United States.

=== 2023 ACS estimates ===
In 2023, the US Census Bureau estimated that the median household income was $136,071, and the per capita income was $60,816. About 3.1% of families and 5.0% of the population were below the poverty line.

=== 2010 census ===
The 2010 United States census reported that Mission Viejo had a population of 93,305. The population density was 5,148.3 inhabitants per square mile (1,987.8/km^{2}). The racial makeup of Mission Viejo was 74,493 (79.8%) White (68.9% Non-Hispanic White), 1,210 (1.3%) African American, 379 (0.4%) Native American, 8,462 (9.1%) Asian, 153 (0.2%) Pacific Islander, 4,332 (4.6%) from other races, and 4,276 (4.6%) from two or more races. Hispanic or Latino of any race were 15,877 persons (17.0%).

The Census reported that 92,363 people (99.0% of the population) lived in households, 859 (0.9%) lived in non-institutionalized group quarters, and 83 (0.1%) were institutionalized.

There were 33,208 households, out of which 11,767 (35.4%) had children under the age of 18 living in them, 20,792 (62.6%) were opposite-sex married couples living together, 2,967 (8.9%) had a female householder with no husband present, 1,306 (3.9%) had a male householder with no wife present. There were 1,211 (3.6%) unmarried opposite-sex partnerships, and 225 (0.7%) same-sex married couples or partnerships. 6,314 households (19.0%) were made up of individuals, and 2,949 (8.9%) had someone living alone who was 65 years of age or older. The average household size was 2.78. There were 25,065 families (75.5% of all households); the average family size was 3.18.

The population was spread out, with 21,270 people (22.8%) under the age of 18, 7,852 people (8.4%) aged 18 to 24, 21,648 people (23.2%) aged 25 to 44, 29,003 people (31.1%) aged 45 to 64, and 13,532 people (14.5%) who were 65 years of age or older. The median age was 42.2 years. For every 100 females, there were 95.4 males. For every 100 females age 18 and over, there were 92.2 males.

There were 34,228 housing units at an average density of 1,888.6 per square mile (729.2/km^{2}), of which 25,859 (77.9%) were owner-occupied, and 7,349 (22.1%) were occupied by renters. The homeowner vacancy rate was 0.9%; the rental vacancy rate was 4.9%. 72,390 people (77.6% of the population) lived in owner-occupied housing units and 19,973 people (21.4%) lived in rental housing units.

According to the 2010 United States census, Mission Viejo had a median household income of $96,088, with 5.3% of the population living below the federal poverty line.

The Mission Viejo-Lake Forest-San Clemente urban area (which also includes the cities of Aliso Viejo, Dana Point, Laguna Beach, Laguna Hills, Laguna Niguel, Laguna Woods, Rancho Santa Margarita and San Juan Capistrano) had a population of 583,681 at the 2010 Census.

== Economy ==
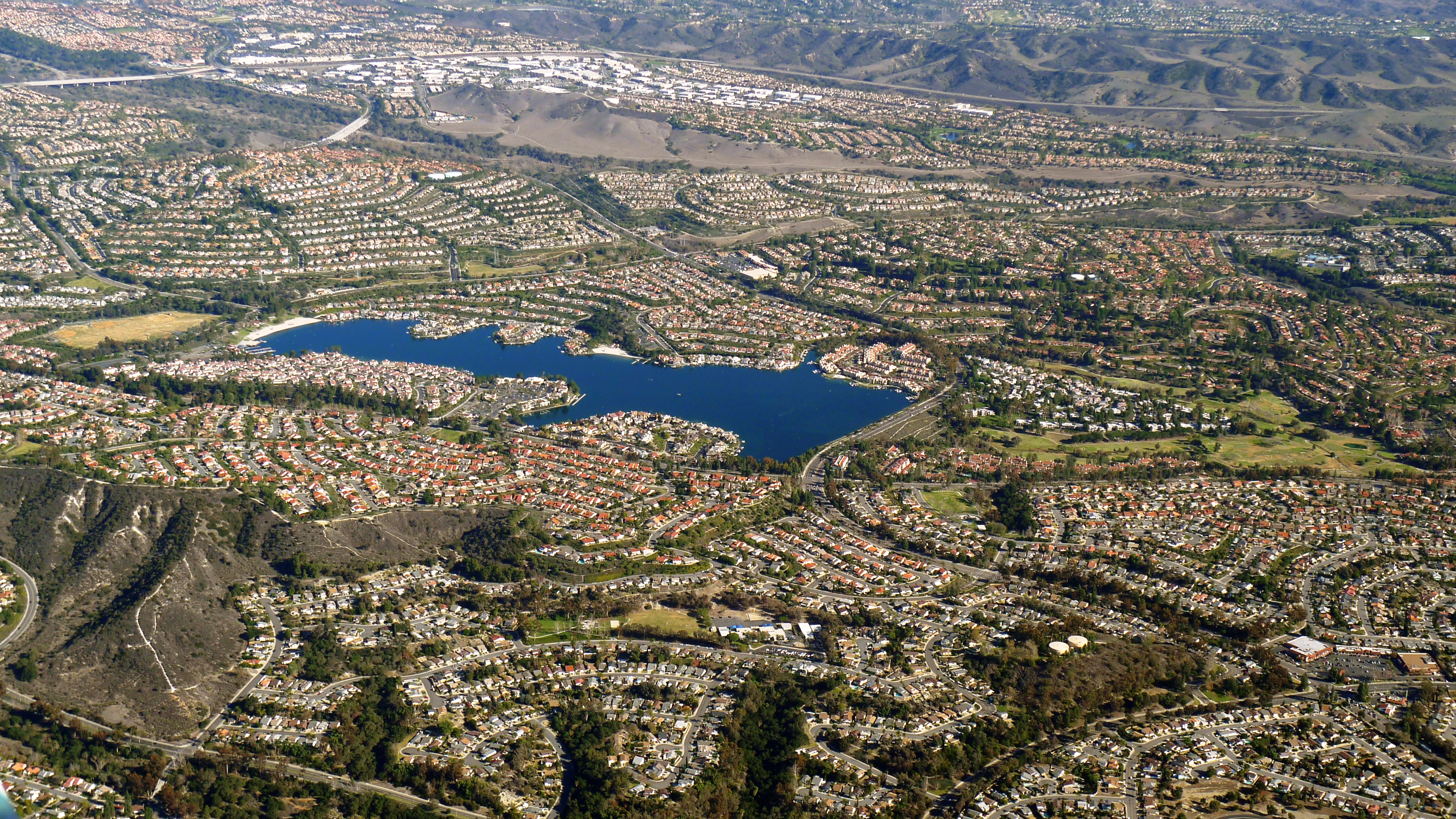
Aerial view of Lake Mission Viejo and surrounding developments, 2014.

According to the city's 2025 Annual Comprehensive Financial Report, the top employers in the city were:

| # | Employer | # of employees |
|---|---|---|
| 1 | Mission Hospital | 2,965 |
| 2 | Saddleback College | 1,883 |
| 3 | Saddleback Valley Unified School District | 1,412 |
| 4 | James Hardie Building Products | 436 |
| 5 | Capistrano Unified School District | 432 |
| 6 | Target Corporation | 408 |
| 7 | Nordstrom | 330 |
| 8 | City of Mission Viejo | 299 |
| 9 | Macy's | 265 |
| 10 | Amazon Delivery Station | 234 |

Marie Callender's has its corporate headquarters in the Marie Callender's Corporate Support Center in Mission Viejo.

== Arts and culture ==
The Shops at Mission Viejo and the Kaleidoscope Center serve as the city's two main shopping, dining and entertainment centers. Both cater to an upper middle class customer demographic and feature family-oriented facilities and services.

Mission Viejo also hosts a number of athletic events such as 5K runs and triathlons throughout the year. The city holds a variety of annually recurring events to celebrate holidays including a street fair and fireworks for Independence Day and public decorations and interactive activities for children during the winter holiday season featuring representation for multiple popular religions.

== Sports ==
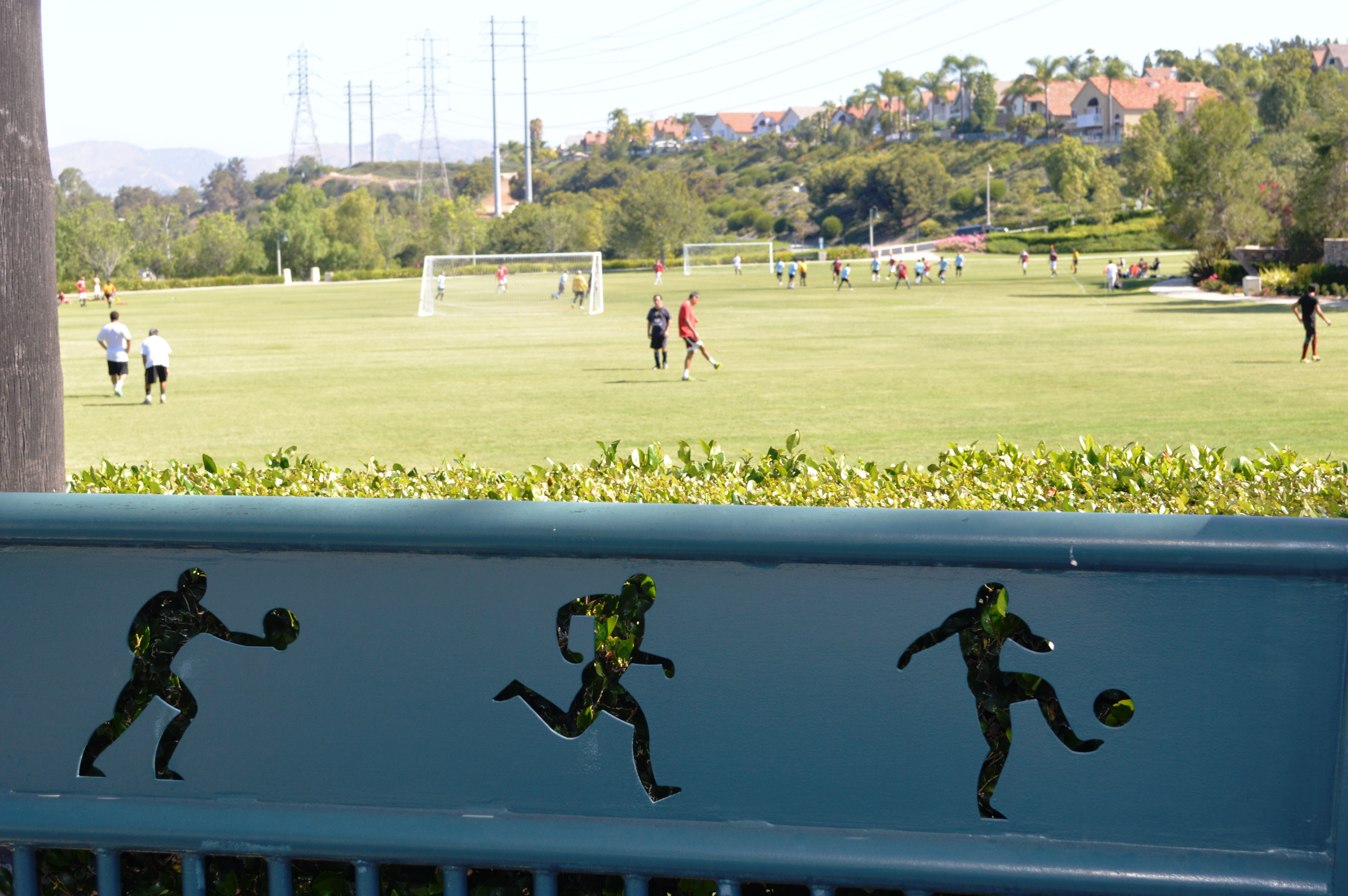
Florence Joyner Olympiad Park

Mission Viejo has a major youth athletic facility, Mission Viejo Youth Athletic Park. The park consists of eight baseball fields and five soccer fields. It is host to Little League District 68, AYSO Region 84, and four competitive soccer clubs: Pateadores Soccer Club, Mission Viejo Soccer Club, West Coast Futbol Club, and Saddleback United Soccer Club.

The Mission Viejo Nadadores Swimming and Mission Viejo Nadadores Diving Team won a string of national championships and produced a number of Olympians and world record holders in the 1970s and 1980s. Olympians included Shirley Babashoff, Brian Goodell, Larson Jenson, Maryanne Graham, Nicole Kramer, Casy Converse, Marcia Morey, Dara Torres, and Greg Louganis.

Mission Viejo hosted the Road Cycling Events during the 1984 Summer Olympics held in Los Angeles. The old O'Neill Road was renamed Olympiad Rd. in honor of the Olympic events in 1984. In 2004, in honor of the 20th anniversary of the 1984 Olympics Cycling Road Race, the City of Mission Viejo dedicated a permanent start/finish line and historic markers which are installed on Olympiad Road near the entrance to Lake Mission Viejo.

There is also a soccer facility, now used by the town's youth soccer program, that was used as a training field by the United States men's national soccer team before and during the 1994 FIFA World Cup, hosted by the United States.

The Saddleback College ballpark hosted the Mission Viejo Vigilantes minor league baseball team of the Western Baseball League from 1996 to 2001. Now the ballpark has a semi-pro collegiate team, the Orange County Fire.

Mission Viejo is also the hometown of NFL quarterback Mark Sanchez, Minnesota Twins pitcher Phil Hughes, and Chicago White Sox first baseman Adam LaRoche, former Milwaukee Brewers pitcher Don August, Boston Red Sox outfielder Allen Craig, Top Shot Season 4 Champion Chris Cheng, and PBA Tour Champion Scott Norton.

== Parks and recreation ==
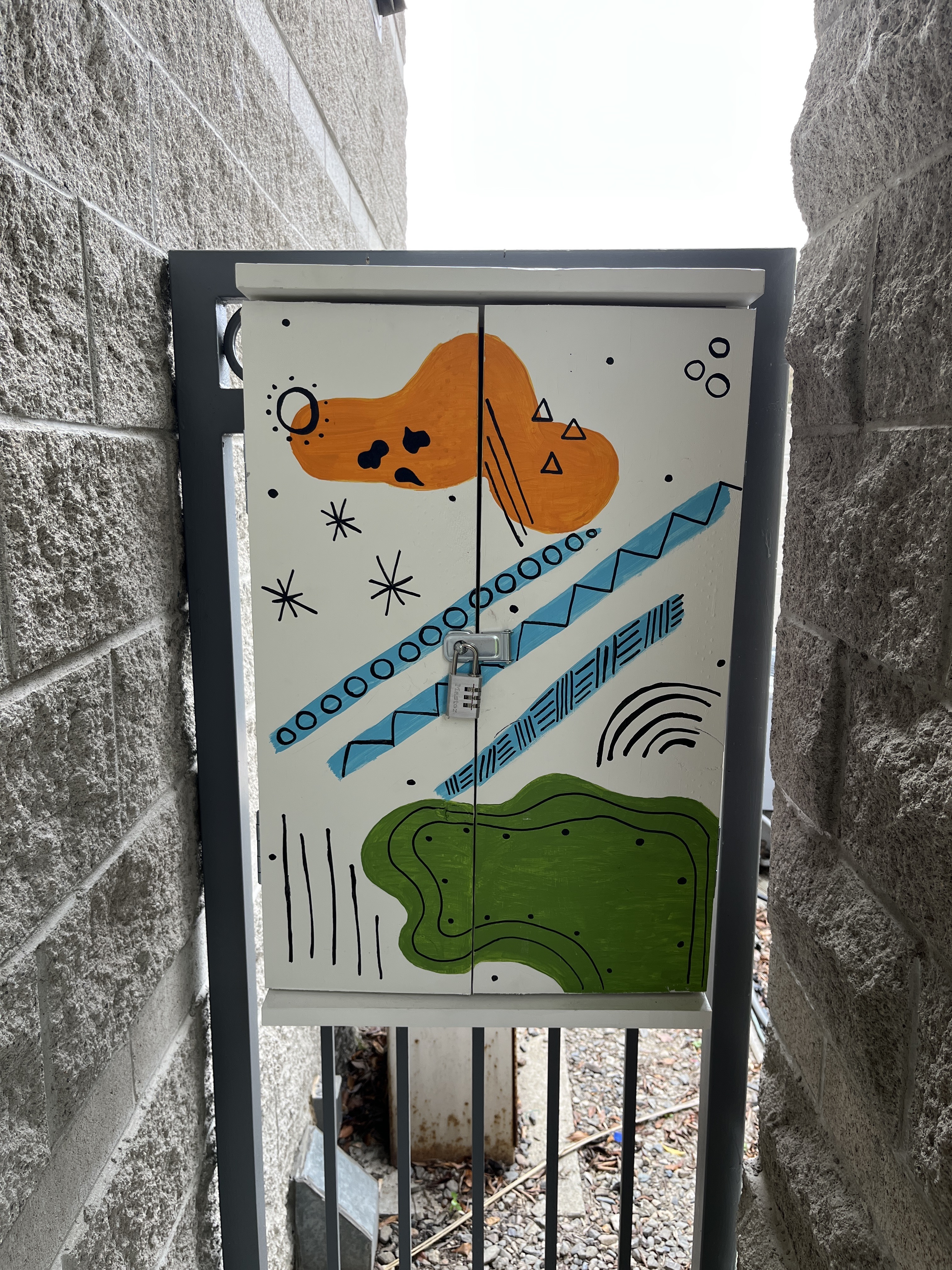
GeoTour geocache at Potocki Center for the Arts

Recreational areas include the Norman P. Murray Community and Senior Center. The city has about two parks per square mile, and three golf courses. At the center of the city is a man-made lake, Lake Mission Viejo, accessible to a private association of Mission Viejo residents, with custom waterfront homes, condominiums, boat and paddle board rentals, fishing, and swim beaches. Lake Mission Viejo holds events such as music concerts and movie screenings, usually complimentary for members and typically during the summer season.

In 2023, the city launched GeoTour, Southern California's first Geocaching tour, consisting of 27 geocaches hidden across the city, with most placed along the trail system at Oso Creek Trail and at city recreation facilities.

== Government ==
Mission Viejo city vote by party in presidential elections
| Year | Democratic | Republican | Third Parties |
|---|---|---|---|
| 2024 | 47.86% 25,554 | 48.87% 26,094 | 3.27% 1,744 |
| 2020 | 49.96% 28,983 | 47.98% 27,837 | 2.06% 1,196 |
| 2016 | 43.71% 21,051 | 49.68% 23,930 | 6.61% 3,184 |
| 2012 | 39.20% 18,361 | 58.52% 27,409 | 2.27% 1,064 |
| 2008 | 43.45% 20,963 | 54.42% 26,255 | 2.14% 1,031 |
| 2004 | 34.89% 16,308 | 64.18% 30,000 | 0.94% 439 |
| 2000 | 35.49% 15,366 | 61.16% 26,482 | 3.35% 1,449 |
| 1996 | 33.35% 12,654 | 57.22% 21,712 | 9.43% 3,580 |
| 1992 | 28.05% 10,406 | 47.41% 17,590 | 24.55% 9,108 |
| 1988 | 25.34% 7,844 | 73.82% 22,854 | 0.84% 260 |

Of the 58,677 registered voters in the city, 24,639 (42.0%) are Republicans, 16,477 (28.1%) are Democrats, 15,002 (25.6%) have no party preference, and the remaining are registered with a minor party.

Mission Viejo is a general law city, which operates under a council-manager form of government. The Mission Viejo City Council consists of five members elected at-large to staggered four-year terms. Each year, the City Council elects a Mayor and a Mayor Pro Tem amongst themselves to serve for one calendar year. The Mayor, who has equal legislative power with fellow members of the City Council, serves as the ceremonial leader of the city and as the presiding officer of the bi-weekly City Council meetings.

The current members of the City Council are Mayor Wendy Bucknum, Mayor Pro Tem Brian Goodell, Patricia "Trish" Kelley, Bob Ruesch and Cynthia Vasquez.

In county government, Mission Viejo is located in the 3rd District, currently represented by Donald P. Wagner.

In the California State Legislature, Mission Viejo is in the 38th senatorial district, represented by Democrat Catherine Blakespear and in the 71st Assembly district, represented by Republican Kate Sanchez.

Federally, Mission Viejo is located in California's 40th congressional district, which has a Cook PVI of R+2 and is represented by Republican Young Kim.

== Education ==
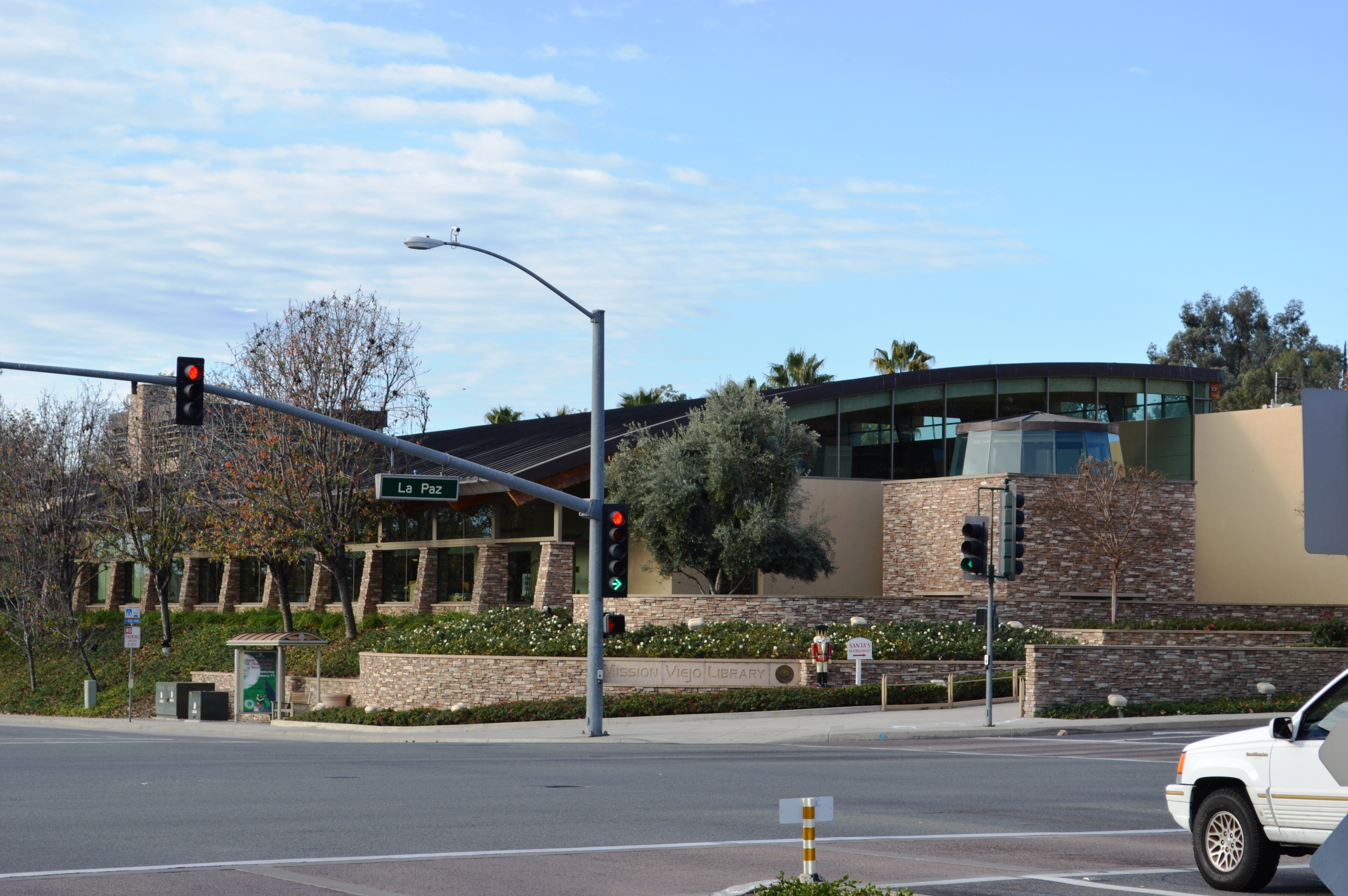
Mission Viejo Library

Mission Viejo is served by two school districts, the Capistrano Unified School District and Saddleback Valley Unified School District. Capistrano Unified serves the eastern, northeastern, and southern portions of the city with eight schools. Students from western Mission Viejo (north of Oso Parkway and west of Marguerite until Alicia Parkway) attend Saddleback Valley's Mission Viejo High School. Far northern Mission Viejo attends Saddleback Valley's Trabuco Hills High School, though most of that school has students from Rancho Santa Margarita and Lake Forest. A few residents attend Tesoro High School in Las Flores or the private Santa Margarita Catholic High School in Rancho Santa Margarita.

Silverado High School, Mira Monte High School, and Pathfinder are continuation and adult schools within the city. Silverado High School provides a day school environment while Mira Monte, which shares the same campus, is strictly independent study.

Saddleback College, near The Shops at Mission Viejo and Capistrano Valley High School, is a large community college in the southern half of the city. In addition, the University of California, Irvine, Chapman University, Soka University of America, and California State University, Fullerton (Irvine Campus), are nearby in adjacent cities.

La Tierra Elementary shut down in June 2009 due to budget cuts. It was chosen due to its small size and minimal student body. The school will remain closed until further notice. Mission Viejo residents refer to La Tierra as "The Little School with a Big Heart". Students there are reassigned to Del Cerro Elementary.

O'Neill Elementary, the city's first elementary school, closed in June 2009 also due to budget cuts in SVUSD. Students in the Deane Home community surrounding the school will be moved to nearby De Portola Elementary. Students living in the homes north of the lake will be moved to Melinda Heights Elementary in Rancho Santa Margarita.

Elementary

Capistrano Unified

- Barcelona Hills Elementary School-closed on June 30, 2012
- Bathgate Elementary School
- Carl Hankey K-8 School
- Castille Elementary School
- Philip J Reilly Elementary School
- Viejo Elementary School

Saddleback Valley Unified

- Cordillera Elementary School-closed in June 2020
- Del Cerro Elementary School
- Del Lago Elementary School
- De Portola Elementary School
- Glen Yermo Elementary School
- La Tierra Elementary School—closed in June 2009
- Linda Vista Elementary School
- Montevideo Elementary School
- O'Neill Elementary School—closed in June 2009

Private

- Carden Academy
- Al Ridah Academy—an Islamic Elementary School
- Oxford Preparatory Academy

Middle school

- Carl Hankey Middle School—CUSD
- Newhart Middle School—CUSD
- La Paz Intermediate School—SVUSD
- Los Alisos Intermediate School—SVUSD

High school

- Capistrano Valley High School—CUSD
- Halstrom High School (formerly Futures High School)—CUSD
- Mission Viejo High School—SVUSD
- Trabuco Hills High School—SVUSD
- Laguna Hills High School— SVUSD
- El Toro High School— SVUSD

College

- Saddleback College

== Infrastructure ==
=== Transportation ===
==== Buses ====
The Orange County Transportation Authority (OCTA) operates the 82, 85, 86, 89, and 91 bus routes in Laguna Niguel. The City of Mission Viejo operated MV Shuttle route 182. The 85 and 182 bus lines provides connecting service to the Metrolink train station.

==== Rail ====
The Laguna Niguel/Mission Viejo station near I-5 in Laguna Niguel is served by the Orange County Line and Inland Empire–Orange County Line of Metrolink commuter rail, providing service to points in Los Angeles, Riverside, San Bernardino and San Diego Counties. The Amtrak Pacific Surfliner served Laguna Niguel from 2007 to 2012, but has since ceased to stop here. Amtrak continues to serve the nearby Irvine and San Juan Capistrano stations.

==== Highways ====
Interstate 5 travels within Mission Viejo's city limits and has five interchanges within the city: Avery Parkway, Crown Valley Parkway, Oso Parkway, La Paz Road, and Alicia Parkway.

California State Route 241 travels within Mission Viejo's city limits and has one interchange within the city at Los Alisos Boulevard.

A very short portion of California State Route 73 travels within Mission Viejo's city limits. There is a Mission Viejo population and elevation road sign directly beneath the northbound onramp that roughly marks the official city limits which travels down the center of Via Escolar to the rail tracks on either side of the interstate. The entrance to SR 73 from I-5 northbound is located in the nearby city of San Juan Capistrano as well as the off ramp from SR 73 to I-5 in the southbound direction. There are no exits or entrances to SR 73 within Mission Viejo.

County Route S18, also known as El Toro Road, travels within Mission Viejo's city limits between Marguerite Parkway / Saddleback Church and Glen Ranch Canyon Road in the most northern part of the city.

The original route for U.S. Highway 101 previously ran through Mission Viejo on what is now El Paseo and Camino Capistrano. A historical marker was placed by the City of Mission Viejo commemorating the historic road route which is located about 0.15 miles south of the intersection of Oso Parkway and Cabot Road, although it is located in the nearby city of Laguna Niguel. It was at the time the only major road connecting San Diego to Los Angeles and San Francisco. It was abandoned when Interstate 5 was completed in the 1950s and has since been mostly removed to make way for interstate expansions and housing or commercial developments. There is a bridge on Camino Capistrano that crosses over Oso Creek that was built for U.S. 101 and dates back to 1938.

=== Health care ===
Mission Hospital is the largest hospital in south Orange County and serves as the area's regional trauma center. It also offers one of two Children's Hospital of Orange County locations providing care for children.

== Notable people ==
- Lee J. Ames (1921–2011), illustrator and writer known for the Draw 50... learn-to-draw books
- Griffin Canning (born 1996), player for the New York Mets of Major League Baseball
- Chris Cheng (born 1979), sports shooter
- Allen Craig (born 1984), former Major League Baseball player
- Javin DeLaurier (born 1998), basketball player in the Israeli Basketball Premier League
- Kevin Fagan (born 1956), syndicated cartoonist for Drabble
- Dave Farrell (born 1977), bassist for Linkin Park.
- Brian Finneran (born 1976), former National Football League wide receiver
- Eddie Fisher (born 1973), musician, drummer for the band OneRepublic
- Julie Foudy (born 1971), former soccer player, member of National Soccer Hall of Fame
- Debbie Friedman (1951–2011), singer and songwriter
- Kelly George (born 1982), Miss Arkansas USA 2007
- Globelamp song artist known as Elizabeth Le Fey
- Brian Goodell (born 1959), swimmer, gold medalist in 1976 Summer Olympics and world-record holder, Mayor of Mission Viejo in 2020
- Kina Grannis (born 1985), singer and songwriter
- Jordan Harvey (born 1984), former soccer player
- Kyle Hendricks (born 1989) Major League Baseball pitcher for the Chicago Cubs
- David Henrie (born 1989), actor, Wizards of Waverly Place
- Andrew J. Hinshaw (1923–2016), member of the U.S. House of Representatives (1975–1977)
- Phil Hughes (born 1986), former Major League Baseball pitcher
- Chandler Hutchison (born 1996), professional basketball player
- Quinton "Rampage" Jackson (born 1978), fighter, former UFC Light-Heavyweight champion
- Florence Griffith Joyner (1959–1998), track-and-field gold medalist in 1988 Summer Olympics
- Brianna Keilar (born 1980), CNN correspondent
- Eugene F. Lally (1934–2014), aerospace engineer, photographer, entrepreneur
- Adam LaRoche (born 1979), former Major League Baseball first baseman
- Pinky Lee (1907–1993), burlesque comic and children's television host
- Michael López-Alegría (born 1958), astronaut
- Greg Louganis (born 1960), Olympic gold medalist in diving
- Todd Marinovich (born 1969), former National Football League quarterback
- Tyler Matzek (born 1990), Major League Baseball relief pitcher for the Atlanta Braves
- Tanner Bibee (born 1999), Major League Baseball starting pitcher for the Cleveland Guardians
- Megan McClung (1972–2006), first female United States Marine Corps officer killed in combat during the Iraq War
- Courtland Mead (born 1987), actor
- Noah Munck (born 1996), actor, iCarly
- Andre Pallante (born 1998), Major League Baseball starting pitcher for the St. Louis Cardinals
- Yiliang "Peter" Peng (born 1993) better known as "Doublelift", former professional League of Legends AD Carry for Team Liquid
- Raymond Persinger (born 1959), sculptor
- Mark Sanchez (born 1986), former National Football League quarterback
- Kaitlin Sandeno (born 1983), former competition swimmer
- Patrick Sandoval (born 1996), Major League Baseball pitcher for the Boston Red Sox
- Savannah (1970–1994), pornographic actress
- Allison Scurich (born 1986), former soccer player
- Larry Sherry (1935–2006), former Major League Baseball relief pitcher, MVP of 1959 World Series
- Emily Skinner (born 2002), actress
- Matt Sorum (born 1960), drummer for Guns N' Roses from 1990 to 1997
- Kristy Swanson (born 1969), actress
- Cameron Tringale (born 1987), pro golfer
- Irv Weinstein (1930–2017), news anchor, relocated to Mission Viejo in the last years of his life
- Lea Moreno Young (born 1977), actress

== See also ==
- Mission Viejo, Aurora, Colorado - a neighborhood in Aurora, Colorado with planned development in the style of Mission Viejo, California
