= Fred Chasan =

American medical doctor and surgeon

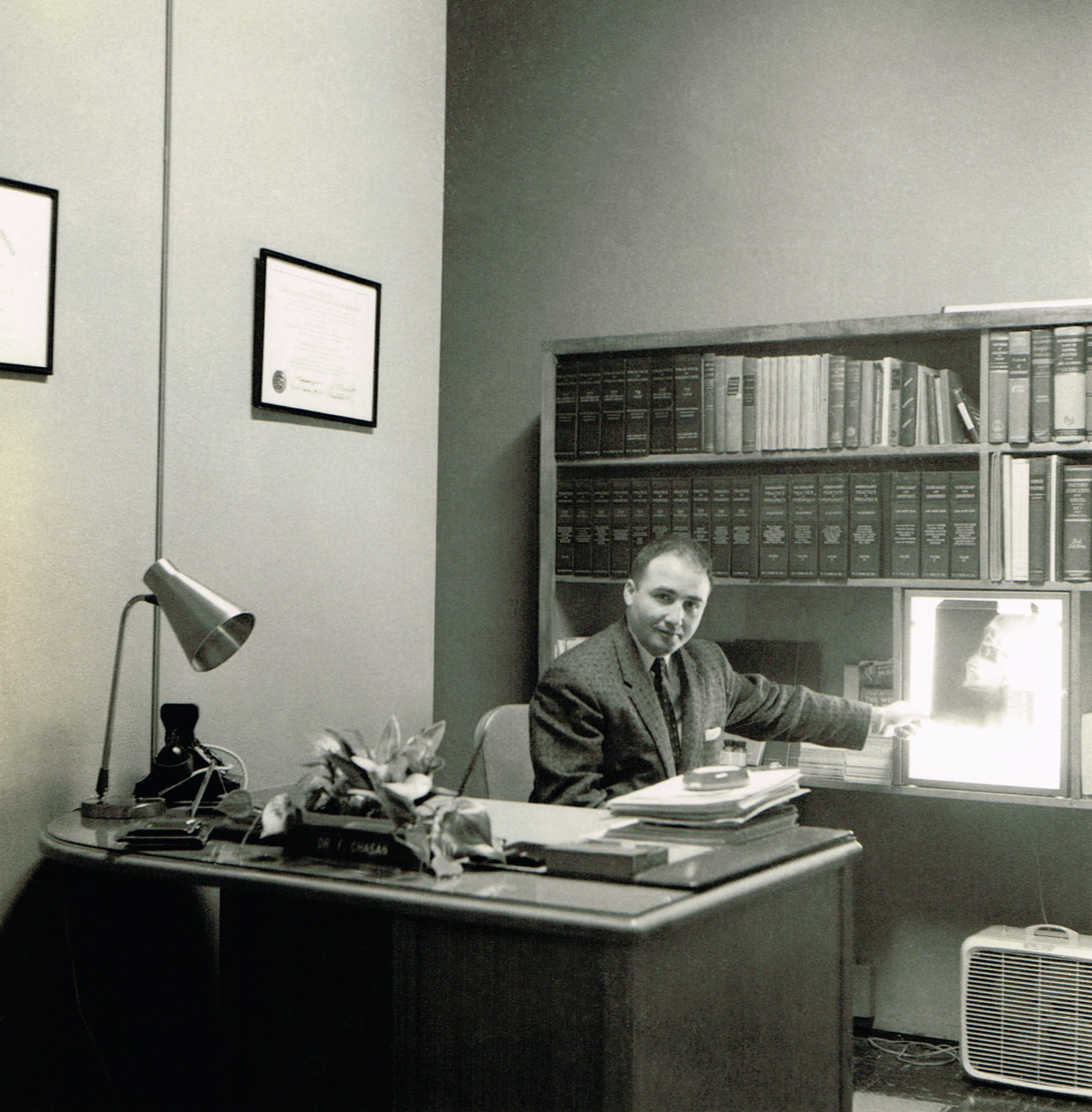
- Born: April 4, 1924; New York City, New York, US
- Died: June 20, 2005 (aged 81); San Diego, California, US
- Citizenship: United States
- Education: New York University (B.A.); University of California, Irvine School of Medicine (M.D.)
- Occupation: Physician
- Spouse: Roslyn Chasan (m. 1954; died 2023)
- Children: 3, including Mark Chasan
- Military career
- Allegiance: United States of America
- Branch: U.S. Army, U.S. Navy
- Years enlisted: 1942-1946
- Rank: Staff Sergeant, Medical Officer
- Conflicts: World War II
- Awards: WWII Victory, EAMTO, ATO, Good Conduct

Fred Chasan (April 4, 1924 – June 20, 2005) was an American physician from Los Angeles, California and veteran of World War II.

== Early life and education ==
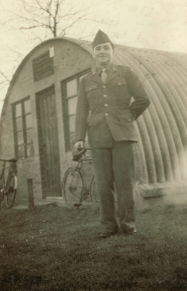
S.Sgt. Chasan in WWII (c.1942)

Chasan was born April 4, 1924, in New York City to Morris and Pauline (née Philips) Chasan.

In 1942, Chasan graduated from the Bronx High School of Science and enrolled in the College of the City of New York majoring in biology for a Bachelor of Science degree. In parallel, he was a medical researcher at the Rockefeller Institute for Medical Research.

After serving as a medic in the United States Army during World War II, Chasan resumed his university studies on the G.I. Bill at New York University, graduating in 1949 with a Bachelor of Arts degree in Biology and Chemistry. He then pursued a Master of Arts from NYU's School of Education. In 1962, Chasan received a medical degree from the University of California, Irvine School of Medicine. In 1974, he was awarded a fellowship degree by the American Academy of Family Physicians.

== Career ==
In the early 1960s, Chasan's wife Roslyn proposed becoming a lawyer, to which Chasan is said to have remarked, "You helped me through medical school – now I will help you [through law school]."

By 1968 Chasan had become the chief of staff at the Memorial Hospital of Gardena, and was named medical director by 1977. During his time in private practice, Chasan worked with Epsilon Sigma Alpha to administer thousands of polio vaccines.

After retiring from private medical practice, Chasan rejoined the United States Military as a medical officer in the Navy working as a physician at Naval Medical Center San Diego in Balboa Park.

== Personal life ==
In 1952, Chasan was set up on a blind date with his future wife Roslyn and the couple married in January 1954. The couple had three sons in the late 1950s and early 1960s, including Mark. Early in their marriage, Roslyn worked as a nurse in Chasan's medical practice.

=== House collapse ===
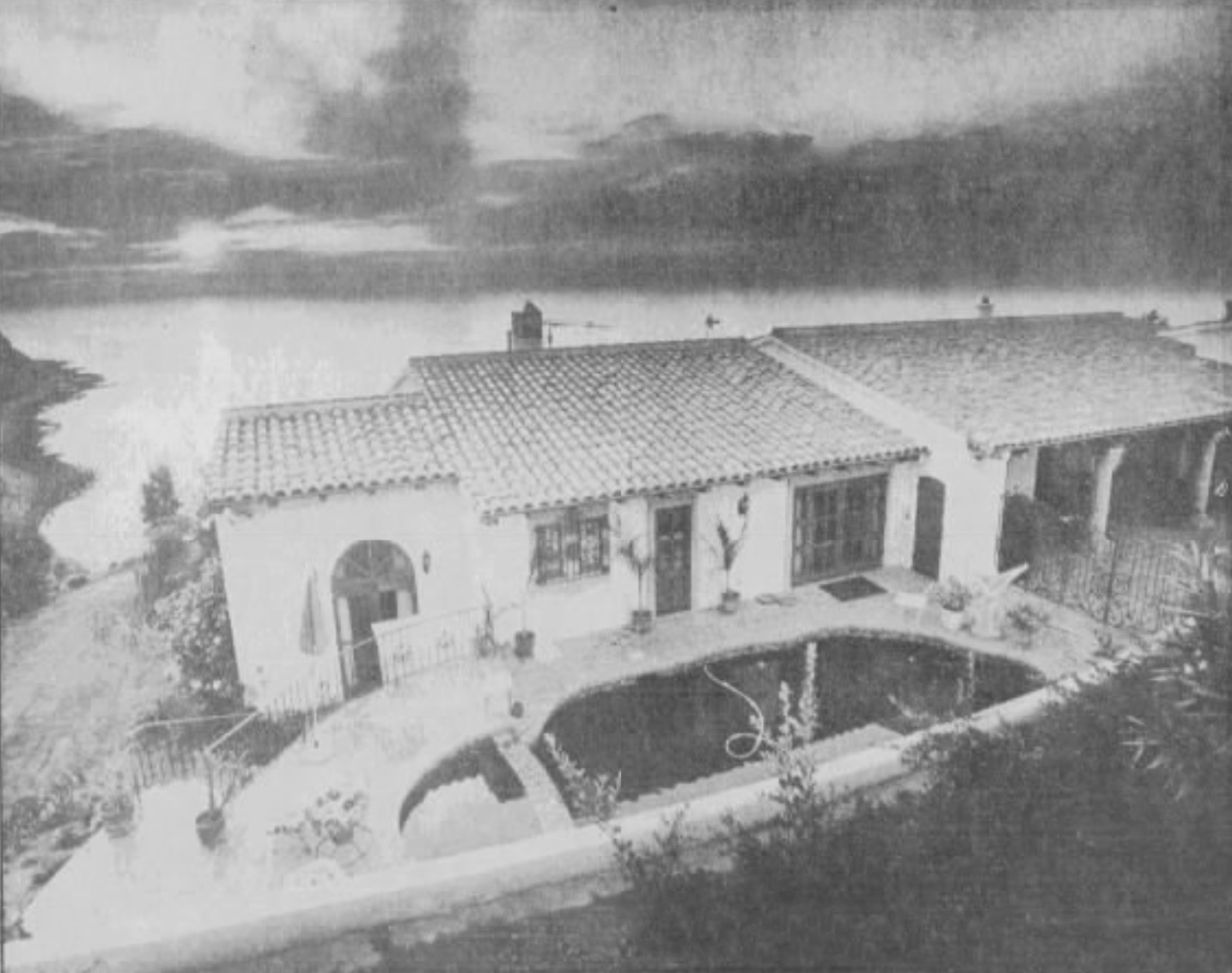
The Chasan Villa circa 1982

In the late 1970s, Chasan and his wife Roslyn built a large Mediterranean-style house on Paseo del Mar in Palos Verdes Estates, California. However, by the early 1980s, a deteriorating city-owned storm drain system, compounded by a broken water main from the California Water Service Company, led to a landslide. The family was forced to evacuate the house in 1981. By 1983, the house had either collapsed into the sea or been demolished. A jury determined the city had failed in its responsibility to maintain the storm drain system, resulting in a settlement with the Chasan family.

=== Later years and death ===
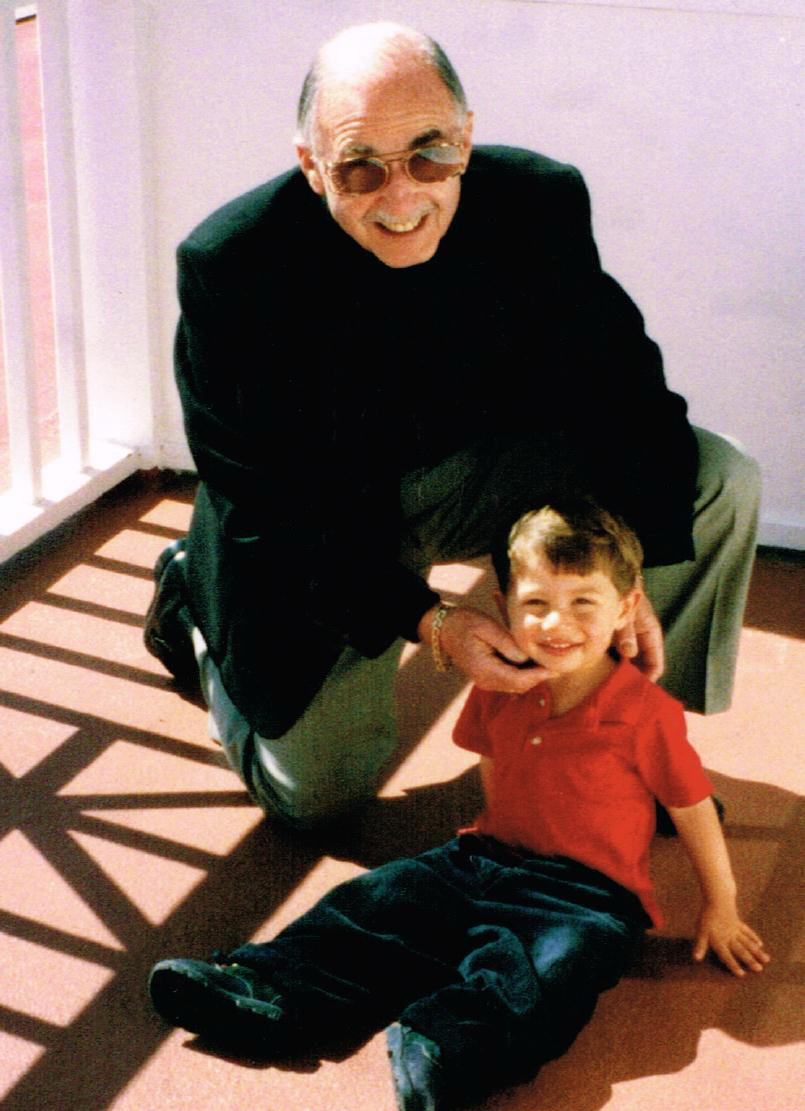
Chasan with his grandson, Jake (c. 2000)

In the aftermath of the collapse of the house, Chasan and Roslyn moved to Manhattan Beach, California, away from the Los Angeles peninsula.

Chasan died on June 20, 2005, and was buried at Fort Rosecrans National Cemetery in California.
