= Silverado High School (Mission Viejo) =

Location
- 25632 Peter A. Hartman Way; Mission Viejo, CA; 33°37′14″N 117°40′59″W

Information
- Type: Public
- School district: Saddleback Valley Unified School District
- Principal: David Gordon
- Grades: 9-12
- Enrollment: 264 (2022-2023)
- Website: www.svusd.org/schools/alternative-schools/silverado

Silverado High School is a continuation high school in Mission Viejo, California, United States. It is part of the Saddleback Valley Unified School District.
