= Roslyn Chasan =

American civil rights attorney (1932–2023)

Roslyn P. Chasan
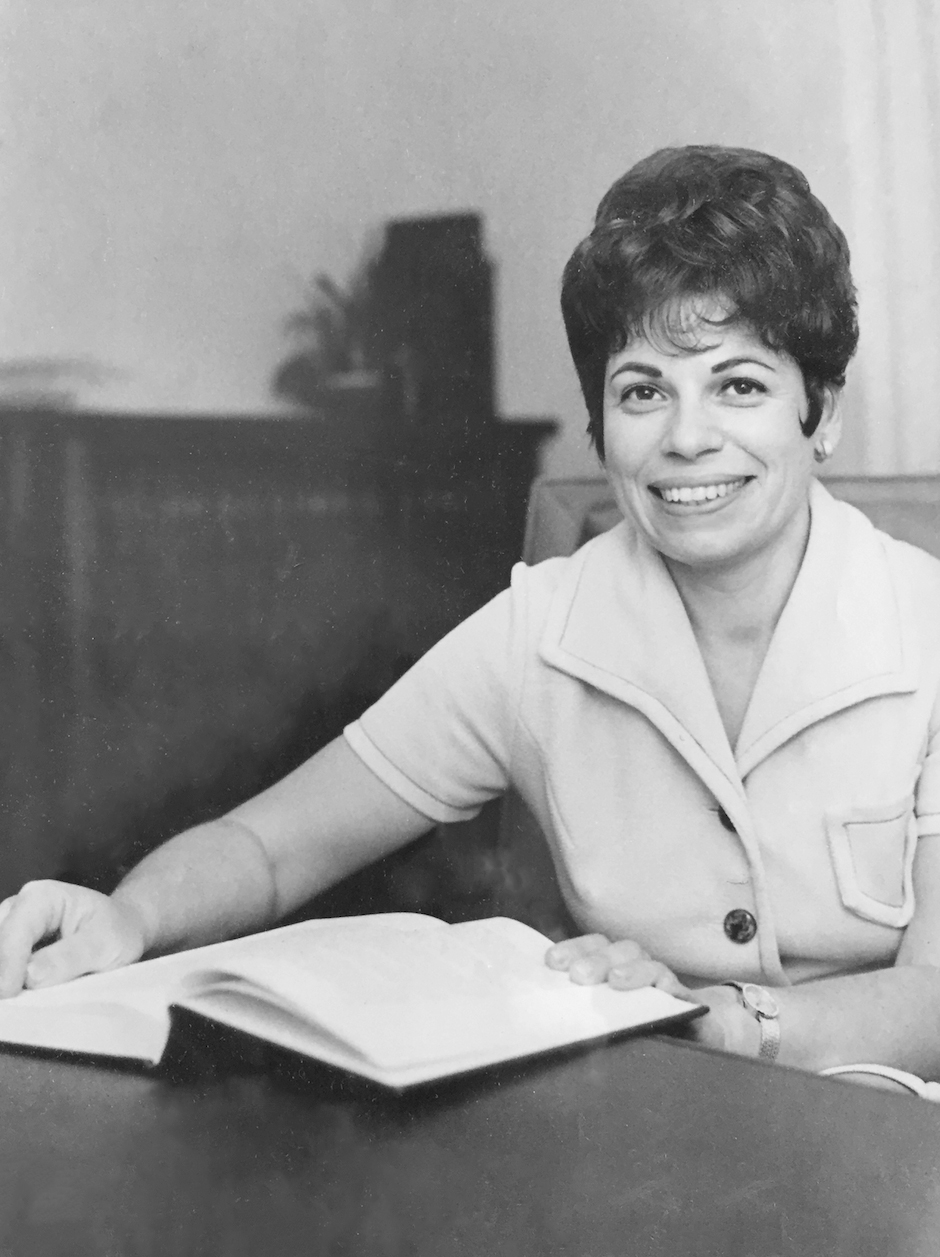
- Born: Roslyn Pearl Lefkowitz; September 22, 1932; Luzerne, Pennsylvania, US
- Died: February 24, 2023 (aged 90); San Diego, California, US
- Spouse: Fred Chasan (m. 1954; died 2005)
- Children: Three sons

Roslyn Chasan (September 22, 1932 – February 24, 2023) was an American lawyer in both corporate and private practice.

== Early life and education ==
Roslyn Pearl Lefkowitz was born September 22, 1932, in Luzrne, Pennsylvania to Herold and Esther (née Neumann) Lefkowitz as the oldest of four siblings.

The family moved to Los Angeles, California when Chasan was a teenager, and she graduated from Susan Miller Dorsey High School. She then completed an associate’s degree in merchandising from the Los Angeles City College’s Merchandising Institute.

She was set up on a blind date with Fred Chasan, a young medical school student who had served as a medic in the European theatre of World War II for the United States Army. The couple married in January 1954 and moved to Rancho Palos Verdes.

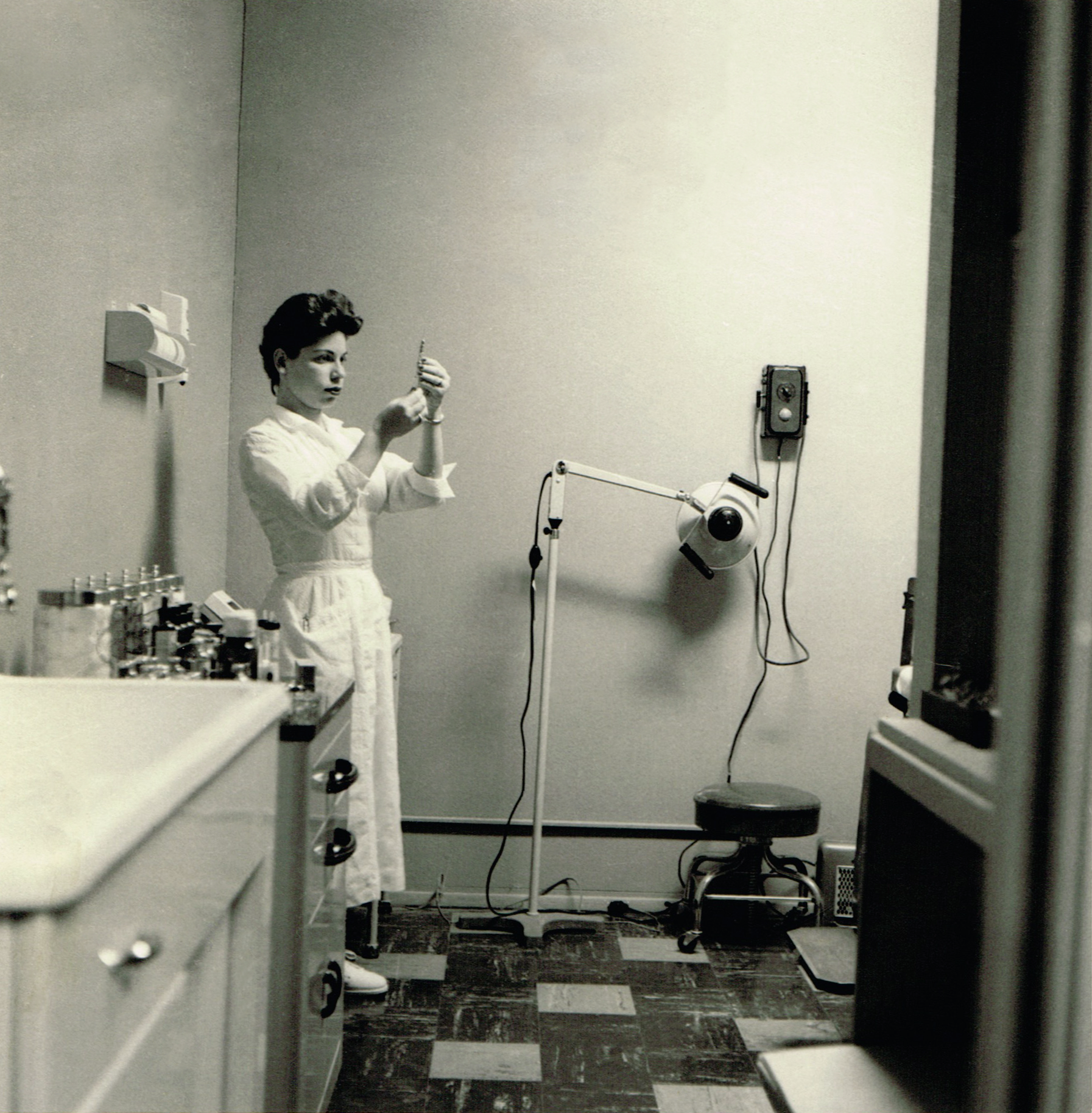
Chasan as nurse (c.1950s)

In their early lives as a couple, Chasan worked as a nurse in her husband's medical practice and in 1958, she was elected president of the Delphian Society, a national organization that promoted the education of women in the mid-twentieth century.

The couple had three sons, Mark, Jeff (father of Jake), and Paul. Mark later followed in his mother’s footsteps, becoming an attorney and entrepreneur, founding eMusic, the first music streaming and digital music distribution company.

In the early 1960s, Chasan decided to become a lawyer. Her husband was fully supportive and remarked at the time, "You helped me through medical school – now I will help you [through law school]." Starting in 1962, for four and a half years, Chasan attended law school at night while raising their three sons, each of whom was under five years old. In 1967, she earned her Juris Doctor, magna cum laude, from Southwestern University School of Law and was admitted to the State Bar of California in 1968 after passing the bar examination. At the time of her graduation, women accounted for less than one percent of the student body.

== Legal and corporate career ==
In 1968, Chasan set up a general practice law office in Torrance, a city within Los Angeles, and by 1969 had become the general counsel for the Great Western Land & Cattle Company. Her role expanded at the organization when she was named vice president and subsequently was given operational responsibility for the company including its securities offerings.

Chasan remained directly involved in the work of the company, organizing and participating in the last overland cattle drive with hundreds of head of cattle from Bluewater, New Mexico across America's spine into southern Colorado near Pagosa Springs. The 192 mile herding was completed ahead of schedule, and required that she bring a successful resolution to several complex territorial access legal negotiations with various governments including that of the Navajo tribe.

In 1970, Chasan helped implement after-school enrichment programs for students in Los Angeles public schools.

Between 1972 and 1974, Chasan was named the head of several key committees of the California Trial Lawyers Association, the nation's largest state trial bar.

In 1974, Chasan represented Ingrid and Heinz Breimhorst on behalf of their son Mark Breimhorst in their case against the chemical company Richardson-Merrell. The jury decided that the widely used fertility drug Clomid caused Mark Breimhorst's deformities, and awarded the family $530,000.

By the early 1980s, Chasan had been appointed judge pro tempore in Los Angeles County court system and an arbitrator for the State Bar of California.

In April 1982, California Governor Jerry Brown appointed Chasan to the California Law Revision Commission. During her term at the agency, the commission had a 98% success rate with recommendations being passed. In August 1982, she was appointed to the board of the Torrance Memorial Hospital Medical Center as a trustee.

== House collapse ==
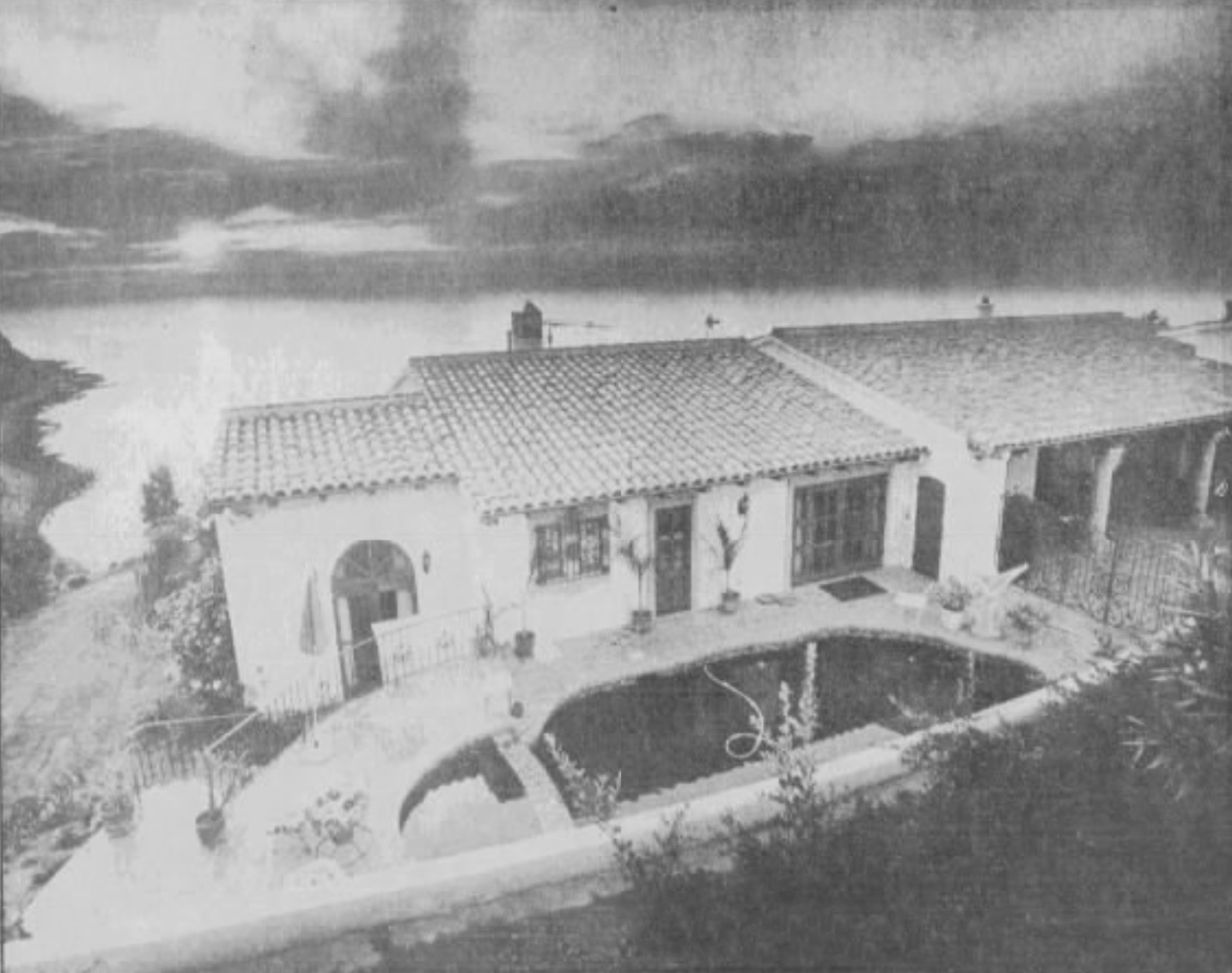
The Chasan Villa, circa 1982

Chasan and her husband Fred built a large Mediterranean-style villa in Palos Verdes Estates, California in the late 1970s. The house was built atop scenic cliffs with a panoramic view of the Pacific Ocean on Paseo del Mar.

In the early 1980s, the aging city-owned storm drain system fell into a state of disrepair and after a California Water Service Company water main broke, a landslide destabilized the cliffs supporting the house's foundation. The family was forced to evacuate the house in 1981 and within two years the remaining portions of the property had either been demolished or fallen into the sea. A jury found the city was negligent in their duties to maintain the storm drain system and the city settled the case.

== Later years and death ==
In the 1990s, Chasan and her husband Fred were early backers of eMusic, the first digital media streaming platform, which was founded by their son, Mark Chasan.

Chasan and her husband moved to Rancho Santa Fe, California, in the late 1980s, after she retired from practicing law. After the death of her husband in 2005, Chasan remained in Southern California until her death of natural causes on February 24, 2023.
