= Saddleback Valley Unified School District =

School district in California

Address
- 25631 Peter A. Hartman Way, Mission Viejo, California, 92691 Mission Viejo, California; United States

District information
- Type: Public
- Grades: K–12
- Superintendent: Crystal Turner, Ed.D.
- Schools: 33
- NCES District ID: 0633860

Students and staff
- Students: 24,954 (2020–2021)
- Teachers: 1,021.84 (FTE)
- Staff: 2,217.35 (FTE)
- Student–teacher ratio: 24.42:1

Other information
- Website: svusd.org

Saddleback Valley Unified School District (SVUSD) is a public school district in South Orange County, California. It serves all of Laguna Hills and Lake Forest, parts of Mission Viejo and Rancho Santa Margarita and the unincorporated communities of Trabuco Canyon and Modjeska. Students living in Laguna Woods also have the option to attend schools in the Saddleback Valley district.

== Schools ==
=== High schools ===
- El Toro High School
- Laguna Hills High School
- Mission Viejo High School
- Silverado High School
- Trabuco Hills High School

=== Intermediate schools ===
- La Paz Intermediate School
- Los Alisos Intermediate School
- Rancho Santa Margarita Intermediate School
- Serrano Intermediate School

=== Elementary schools ===
- Cielo Vista Elementary School
- de Portola Elementary School
- Del Cerro Elementary School
- Del Lago Elementary School
- Foothill Ranch Elementary School
- Gates Dual Language Immersion Elementary School
- Glen Yermo Elementary School
- Lake Forest Elementary School
- La Madera Elementary School
- La Tierra Early Childhood Center
- Linda Vista Magnet Elementary School (IB World School)
- Lomarena Elementary School
- Melinda Heights Elementary School
- Montevideo Elementary School
- Olivewood Elementary School
- Portola Hills Elementary School
- Rancho Cañada Elementary School
- Robinson Elementary School
- Santiago STEAM Magnet Elementary School
- Trabuco Elementary School
- Trabuco Mesa Elementary School
- Valencia Elementary School

=== Alternative Schools ===
- Esperanza Education Center
- High School Credit Recovery
- Silverado High School

=== Saddleback Virtual Academy ===
The SVUSD Virtual Academy serves students at the Elementary, Intermediate, and High School levels.

=== Defunct Schools ===
- Aliso Elementary School
- Cordillera Elementary School
- San Joaquin Elementary School
- O'Neil Elementary School

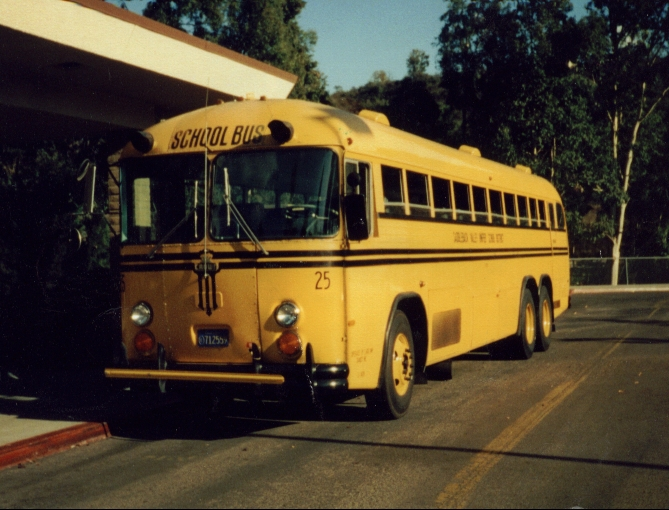
1978 Crown Supercoach 90-passenger used by the district

== Sex abuse allegations ==
On March 23, 2022, two former Mission Viejo High School students filed a civil suit in Orange County Superior Court alleging that James Harris, husband of SVUSD visual and performing arts coordinator Kathy Cannarozzi Harris as well as a substitute teacher at the school, groomed them and sexually abused them in the late 1990s. One of the plaintiffs was 15 at the time. The women allege that Kathy Harris personally observed the abuse, which allegedly occurred on the Mission Viejo High School campus and at her home. According to the filing, they reported the abuse to the SVUSD several times over the course of two decades, but no decisive action was taken. Jim Harris denied the allegations to the Los Angeles Times. The SVUSD said it was investigating. Kathy Harris still teaches at the school.
