= University of California, Irvine School of Medicine =

Public medical school at Irvine, California, US

Coordinates: 33.6449°N 117.8499°W

- Former names: California College of Osteopathic Physicians and Surgeons; California College of Medicine
- Established: 1896
- Parent institution: University of California, Irvine
- Dean: Michael J. Stamos, MD
- Location: Irvine, California, USA
- Campus: Suburb
- Website: medschool.uci.edu

The University of California, Irvine School of Medicine (with the affiliated healthcare system branded as UC Irvine Health) is the medical school of University of California, Irvine, located in Irvine, California. It is accredited by the Liaison Committee on Medical Education.

The school owns UC Irvine Medical Center and is affiliated with the Children's Hospital of Orange County. The school was founded in 1896 by A.C. Moore and is the oldest continually operating medical school in the greater Los Angeles area.

== History ==
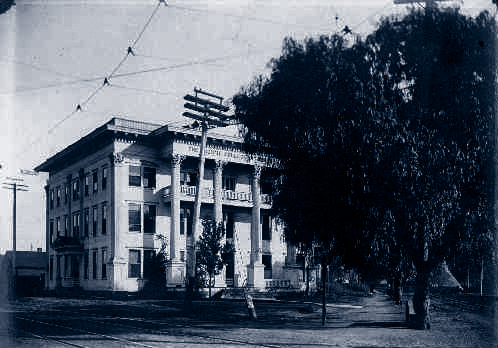
An early photo of the sanitarium and school that was the forerunner of the University of California Irvine School of Medicine

Although the School of Medicine joined UC Irvine in 1967, its history goes back more than 100 years. In 1896, the Pacific College of Osteopathy was founded in the city of Anaheim. Upon moving to Los Angeles in 1904, and through a merger with the Los Angeles College of Osteopathy, the California College of Osteopathic Physicians and Surgeons was created in 1914 and would exist as such until 1961.

In that year, as the California Osteopathic Association merged with the California Medical Association, the college was converted into an MD-granting medical school and was renamed the California College of Medicine (CCM). Over the next three years, its administrators worked with the University of California to have it become the third UC medical school, joining those on the San Francisco and Los Angeles campuses. This was accomplished on October 1, 1965, when the California College of Medicine passed into the full control of the UC Regents and became part of the University of California. Four days later, UC President Clark Kerr received a CCM faculty resolution requesting that the Regents designate UC Irvine as the campus on which the College of Medicine be developed.

On April 20, 1967, the UC Regents approved moving the California College of Medicine to the Irvine campus, creating the UC Irvine College of Medicine. Following that, on July 23, 1968, the Orange County Board of Supervisors approved an affiliation between the Orange County Medical Center and the UC Irvine College of Medicine, giving the medical school a teaching hospital.

The UC Irvine College of Medicine moved onto the UC Irvine campus in 1968, and on August 29, a first-year class of 94 students began coursework in the Med Surge I and II buildings. Six years later, on October 3, 1974, the UC Regents purchased the Orange County Medical Center for $5.5 million. The facility was renamed the UC Irvine Medical Center.

== Academics ==
The Sue and Bill Gross Stem Cell Research Center

The School of Medicine consists of 19 clinical and 6 basic science departments and has several graduate degree-granting programs. These include PhD programs in epidemiology, the interdisciplinary PhD program in cellular & molecular biosciences (CMB) the Interdepartmental Neuroscience Program (INP), pharmacology and toxicology, and MS programs in environmental toxicology and genetic counseling.

== Campus ==
UC Irvine's Medical Education Building, which opened in April, 2010, on the Irvine campus.

In 2010, UC Irvine opened its $40.5 million, 65,000-square-foot (6,000 m2) on-campus medical education building that provides a simulation training center along with clinical laboratories and telemedicine stations.

The UC Irvine School of Medicine was the first medical school in the country to adopt a totally tablet-based curriculum.

== Notable faculty ==
- Irwin Rose, Nobel Laureate (2004), known for Ubiquitin-mediated protein degradation
- Kamyar Kalantar-Zadeh, nephrology, nutrition and epidemiology
- Frank L. Meyskens Jr., oncology

== Notable alumni ==
- Philip "Phil" Erenberg (1909–1992), gymnast and Olympic silver medalist
- Fred Chasan (1924–2005), surgeon and owner of The Chasan Villa
