= California Water Service Group =

American public utility company

- Company type: Public
- Traded as: NYSE: CWT; S&P 600 component
- Industry: Utilities; Water and wastewater
- Headquarters: San Jose, California, United States
- Products: Water
- Revenue: 846,431,000 United States dollar (2022)
- Subsidiaries: California Water Service; Hawaii Water Service; New Mexico Water Service; Washington Water Service; CWS Utility Services; HWS Utility Services
- Website: calwatergroup.com

California Water Service Group (CWSG) is an American public utility company providing drinking water and wastewater services. It is the third-largest investor-owned publicly traded water utility in the United States, serving roughly two million people through its subsidiary companies in California, Hawaii, New Mexico and Washington. CWSG was formed in 1997 as a new holding company for California Water Service to expand into other states regulated by their own public utilities commissions, and into other non-regulated businesses.

== Acquisitions ==
In 1998, CWSGs original subsidiary, California Water Service, made a major expansion into Southern California with the purchase of Dominguez Services Corp. for $53 million, incorporating its subsidiaries Antelope Valley Water Co. and Kern River Valley Water Co. into Cal Water's service districts.

In 2002, CWSG acquired Rio Grande Utility Corporation to form its New Mexico Water Service subsidiary. It subsequently expanded in this region with the acquisitions of National Utility Company, Cypress Gardens Water Users, Independent Utility Company and Indian Hills Water Company.

In 2003, CWSG acquired Ka'anapali Water Corp. on the island of Maui for $8 million to form its Hawaii Water Service subsidiary.
