= Paseo del Mar =

Street in Palos Verdes and San Pedro in Los Angeles, California

Paseo del Mar is a street in the Palos Verdes Peninsula of Los Angeles, California, specifically stretching from Palos Verdes Estates, through Rancho Palos Verdes, to San Pedro that goes along the Pacific Ocean. The street continues to the west as Palos Verdes Drive and ends in the east just past Gaffey Street near The Sunken City.

In the early 1980s, due to the disrepair of water mains and storm drains by the city and the California Water Service Company, a landslide destabilized the cliffs and destroyed several homes.

By 1984 the area surrounding Paseo del Mar and Palos Verdes Drive was used as the location for the headquarters of The Avengers and later home of Tony Stark (Iron Man) in the Marvel Cinematic Universe.

In November 2011, part of the street fell into the ocean in a landslide, permanently splitting the road.
