= Dairy Termination Program =

The Dairy Termination Program or the "Whole Herd Buyout" is a program created by Cooperatives Working Together (CWT). Participating farmers must submit their entire herds to slaughter. The farmer is then compensated for the amount of milk that animal would have produced over the course of one year. CWT acquires funding from cooperatives throughout the country who aim to raise the price of milk. CWT receives no federal funding.
