= Chasan (grape) =

Variety of grape

- Grape (Vitis)
- Color of berry skin: Blanc
- Species: Vitis vinifera
- Also called: E.M. 1527-78
- Origin: France
- VIVC number: 2470

Chasan is a white French wine grape variety grown primarily in the Languedoc wine region. According to the Vitis International Variety Catalogue, the variety is a crossing of Listan and Pinot. However, some sources (such as wine experts Jancis Robinson and Oz Clarke) describe the grape as a crossing between Listan and Chardonnay. All sources agree, however, that the variety was created in 1958 by Paul Truel at the Institut National de la Recherche Agronomique (INRA) - Unité Expérimentale du Domaine de Vassal & Montpellier SupAgro. One possible source for the confusion of the grapes parentage is that a common synonym of several clones of Chardonnay are sometimes listed as Pinot Chardonnay and Chardonnay, itself, was a crossing of Pinot and the obscure French wine grape Gouais blanc.

== Wine region ==
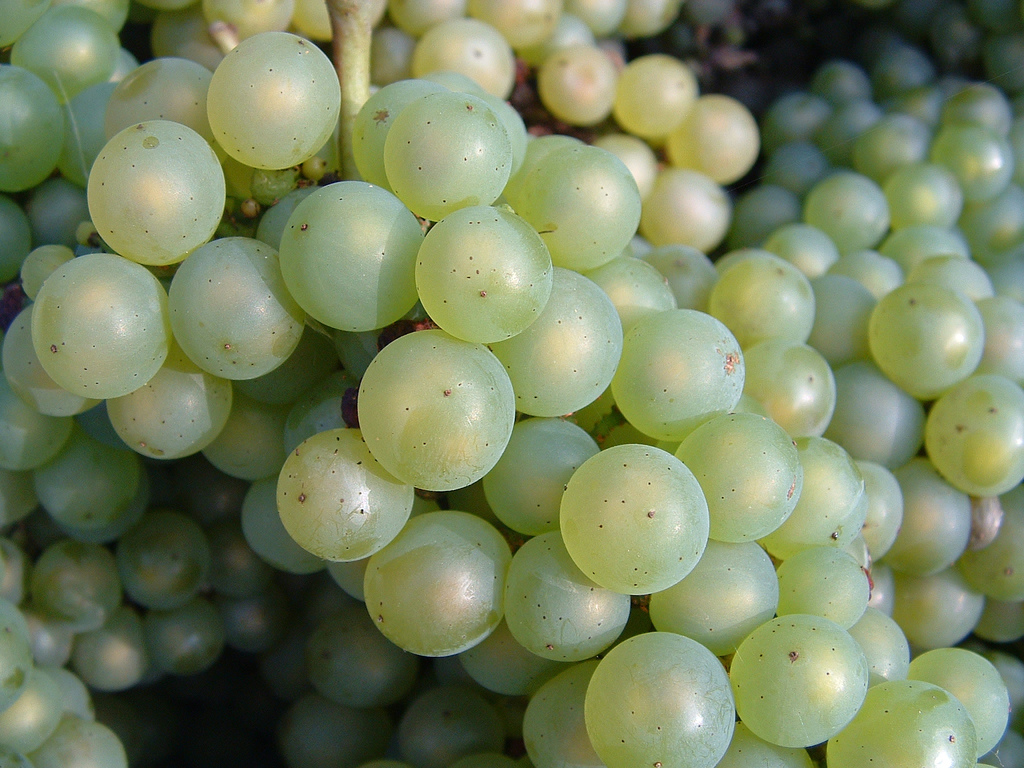
Chardonnay, one of the potential parents of Chasan

While the grape is a recommended planting for every major French wine region except Alsace, Chasan is only planted on a limited scale in the Languedoc region where it is usually found in experimental vin de pays blends.

== Viticulture ==
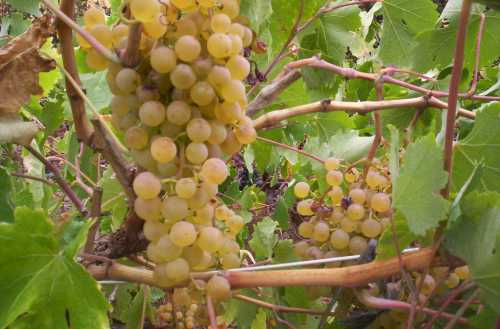
Palomino (or Listan), the one parent of Chasan that is not in dispute

Like Chardonnay, Chasan is an early budding variety and can be at risk for springtime frost. However, like the Pinot family, the variety tends to ripens late and often doesn't develop the sugars or complexity to make a varietal wine similar to either Chardonnay or most of the Pinot family of grapes.

== Synonyms ==
Chasan is also known under its breeding code E.M. 1527–78.
