= UC Irvine Medical Center =

Coordinates: 33.78781°N 117.88857°W

University of California, Irvine Medical Center
- UC Irvine Health

Geography
- Location: Bldg 1, 101 The City Drive South, Orange, CA 92868, Orange, California, United States

Organization
- Care system: Private
- Type: Teaching
- Affiliated university: University of California, Irvine

Services
- Emergency department: Level I Adult Trauma Center / Level II Pediatric Trauma Center
- Beds: 411

History
- Founded: 1965

Links
- Website: ucihealth.org/locations/orange/uci-medical-center
- Lists: Hospitals in California

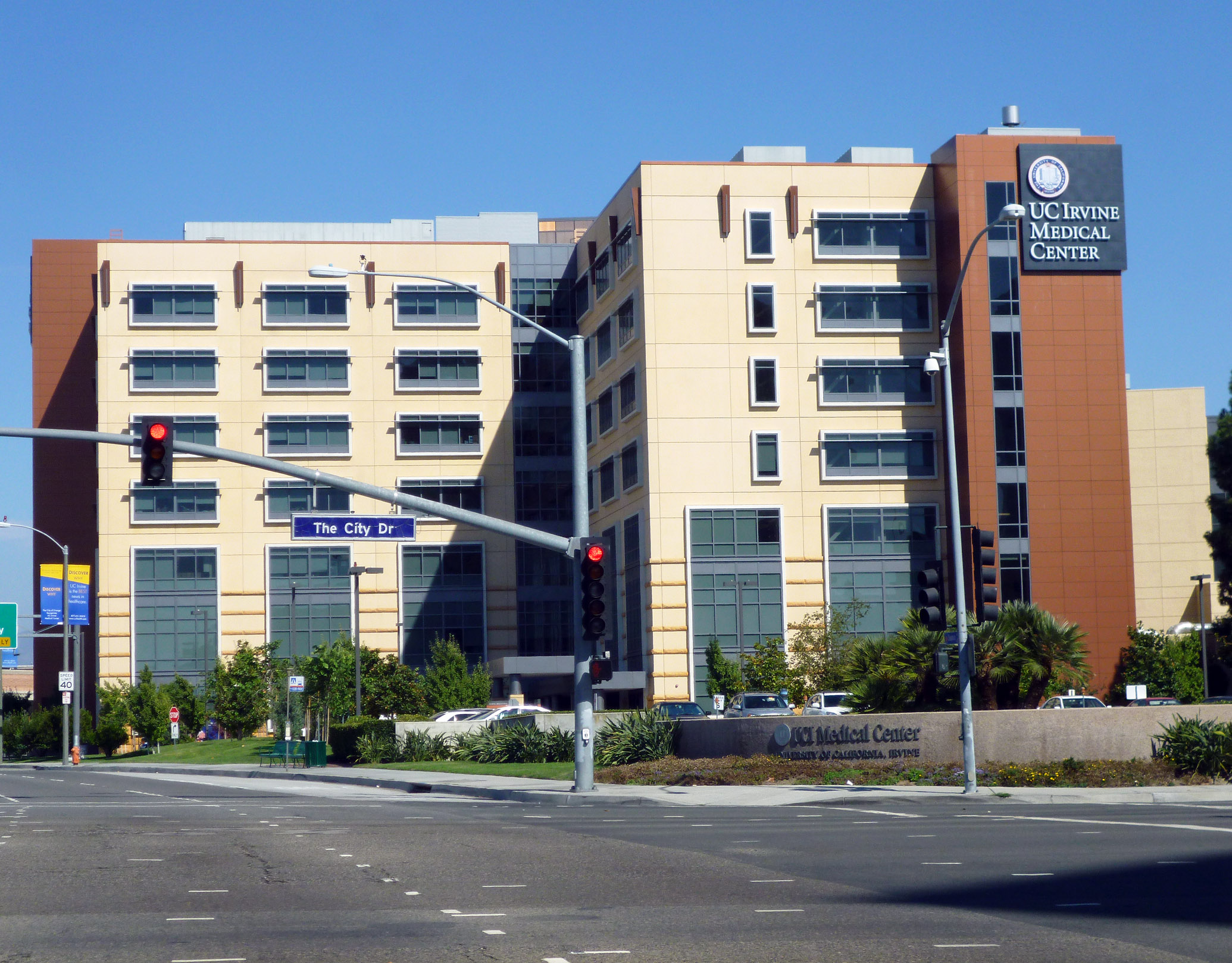
UC Irvine Medical Center

The University of California, Irvine Medical Center (UCIMC or UCI Medical Center) is a major research hospital located in Orange, California. It is the teaching hospital for the University of California, Irvine School of Medicine.

== History ==
Plans had been in place since the founding of the school for a medical center, and space was set aside on campus. This would model the hospital campuses at the University of California, Los Angeles and the University of California, San Diego. Political divisions between the American Medical Association and Californian osteopaths brought the medical school to UCI early.

The California College of Medicine was the oldest continuously operating medical college in the Southwest United States. Starting in 1896 as the Pacific College of Osteopathy, it was renamed the College of Osteopathic Physicians and Surgeons. Due to pressure by the AMA, it was renamed to the California College of Medicine and was merged with the UC system in 1965.

Dean of Medicine Stanley van den Noort supported there being a teaching hospital on campus, placing him in political opposition to Governor Jerry Brown. Brown blocked the release of funds for the hospital's construction and diverted them to founding the UCSF's dental school. He also vetoed a compromise for UCI to take care of Orange County Medical Center's patients in exchange for a 200-bed hospital. Under pressure from Brown, the UC purchased the OCMC in 1976 from the county. This acquisition effectively halted the push for an on-campus hospital.

The medical center is home to the Chao Family Comprehensive Cancer Center, a National Cancer Institute-designated center for cancer treatment and research. Other onsite buildings include the Neuropsychiatric Center, the UCI Health Sciences Laboratories building, and clinical outpatient pavilions on the medical center site, as well as community family health centers in Irvine, Santa Ana, Westminster, and Anaheim.

In 2016, two UC Irvine Health specialties were included among the top 50 nationally: 40th for orthopedics and 41st for ear, nose, and throat. It has the county's only Level I trauma center and its sole multiple-organ transplant center, and is the only hospital in the area offering a number of specialized surgeries. The medical center has been home to a number of firsts—including the first heart transplant in Orange County, the first implant on the West Coast of an insulin pump in a patient with diabetes, and a number of research breakthroughs involving therapy for cancer and other diseases.

The UC Irvine Medical Center was in the news in October 2021 when former President Bill Clinton was hospitalized there with early-stage sepsis due to a non-COVID-related urinary tract infection; he was expected to fully recover, and his illness raised awareness of the center and of the serious condition.

=== Controversies ===
In 1995, three doctors at the UCI Center for Reproductive Health were accused of taking eggs from a woman without her consent and transferring them to another woman, who delivered a baby. Investigators later found that these doctors had stolen eggs from 100 women. Although the misuse of eggs was not illegal at the time, the doctors involved were indicted for mail fraud and tax evasion, and the two fled the country.

In 2003, UCI hired Jagat Narula and Mani Vannan as the chief and division chief of cardiology. Neither was board certified in internal medicine nor cardiology, and neither had a California medical license.

In 2003, Dr. Glenn Provost presented a 13-signature petition outlining anesthesia safety problems. He stated that soon after complaining about a supervisor forcing him "to take patients to the operating room without consent, chart, or preoperative check-in by the operating room nurse ... in an attempt to cut costs," he was fired and blackballed. Persons close to the case feel that there was a vendetta against Dr. Provost by Cynthia Anderson, the prior chair.

In 2005, it came to light that 32 patients had died while waiting for liver transplants at UCI. Some livers were available, but, for two years, UCI did not have a full-time surgeon to implant them, in contravention of federal regulations. UCI's designated surgeon was actually on staff at UC San Diego, 70 miles away. A patient at UCI, Elodie Irvine, filed a lawsuit. Ms. Irvine, who had liver and kidney disease, had 95 organs offered for transplant by the United Network for Organ Sharing during her stay at UCI. The hospital allegedly told the patient that they were waiting for organs, when in fact they rejected every organ offered to them. Only one UCI physician advised her to look elsewhere for a transplant.

Over the years, there have been several cases of sexual harassment allegations against the employees of UC Irvine Medical Center. In June 1994, Christina Grudzinski, a second-year resident, accused her attending physician and her chief resident of sexual harassment. She later sued the university after the situation was unresolved and claimed the university faculty retaliated against her by firing her. She lost the court proceedings to the university in 2002 after the trial court and all of the higher courts on appeal ruled her lawsuit was "frivolous" and ordered her to pay $1.1 million back to the university in court fees. Carlin Motley, a fundraiser for the hospital, filed a lawsuit in 2018 claiming she was not protected from a university volunteer who stalked and sexually harassed her for more than one year prior. The lawsuit remains ongoing.

== Capabilities ==
University of California, Irvine Medical Center is the only university hospital in Orange County with more than 400 specialty and primary care physicians. The medical center offers a full scope of acute- and general-care services including cancer care, digestive diseases, heart health neurology, neurosurgery, orthopedic surgery, primary care, surgery, and women's health. It is the only hospital in Orange County recognized in U.S. News & World Report’s annual listing of "America's Best Hospitals" and first to receive Magnet Designation for nursing excellence. The medical center has also been named one of the nation's top hospitals for quality and safety by the Leapfrog Group.

Located in the City of Orange, 13 miles from the UCI campus, UC Irvine Medical Center has 411 licensed beds and is the principal clinical facility for the teaching and research programs of the UC Irvine School of Medicine. The seven-story UC Irvine Douglas Hospital was completed in late 2011. Additionally, there are 45 licensed beds in their Level III Neonatal Intensive Care Unit, 19 high-tech operating rooms including two hybrid cardiac care operating rooms, and eight beds in the Burn Intensive Care Unit.
