= Rady Children's Health =

Coordinates: 33°46′53″N 117°51′55″W

Children's Hospital of Orange County (CHOC)

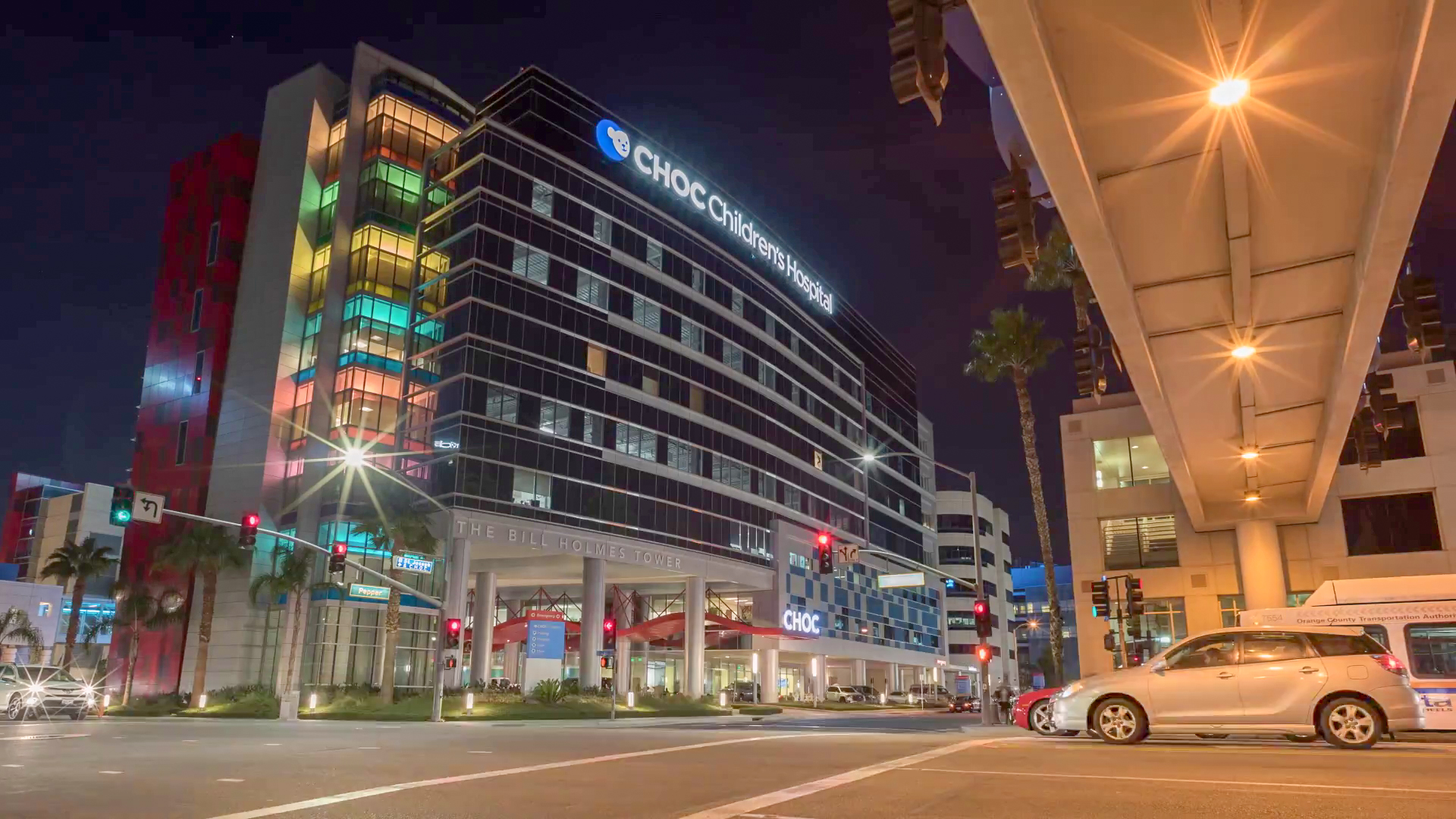
- The front of the CHOC at night.

Geography
- Location: Orange, Orange County, California, United States

Organization
- Affiliated university: University of California, Irvine School of Medicine

Services
- Emergency department: Level I Pediatric Trauma Center
- Beds: 334

Helipads
- Helipad: FAA LID: 4CA5, runways H1 & H2

History
- Founded: 1964

Links
- Website: http://www.choc.org/
- Lists: Hospitals in California

Rady Children's Health is a pediatric healthcare system based in Orange County, California. Its flagship hospital, CHOC Hospital Main Campus – Orange, is a pediatric acute care hospital located in Orange, California. The hospital has 334 beds and is affiliated with the University of California, Irvine School of Medicine. The hospital provides comprehensive pediatric specialties and subspecialties to pediatric patients aged 0–21 throughout Orange County and the Southern California area. The CHOC Main Campus also features a Level I Pediatric Trauma Center, the only of such in Orange County.

The regional pediatric healthcare network includes a 334-bed main hospital facility in the City of Orange, and a hospital-within-a-hospital in Mission Viejo. CHOC also offers many primary and specialty care clinics, over 100 additional programs and services, and a pediatric residency program.

== History ==
CHOC officially traces its founding to local entrepreneurs Walt Disney and Walter Knott, the founders of Disneyland and Knott's Berry Farm, respectively.

In 2013, CHOC opened the new $563 million Bill Holmes Tower, adding seven-stories and 425,524 square feet. The addition also included a new and advanced pediatric emergency department, operating rooms and related services, laboratory, pathology, imaging and radiology services. The tower also features additional private rooms and enhanced family amenities. The new surgery center in the addition was funded from a $30 million donation by the estate of Robert L. Tidwell and bears his name.

In 2013 as a part of the new tower, CHOC opened the first pediatric only emergency department in Orange County with the opening of the Julia and George Argyros Emergency Department on March 26, 2013. The new addition was funded by a five million dollar donation by Julia and George Argyros. The 22,000 square foot emergency department also features an ACS verified level II pediatric trauma center including 14 rapid evaluation and discharge exam rooms and three triage suites and features 31 treatment rooms.

In November 2020, Dwayne "The Rock" Johnson collaborated with Microsoft and billionaire Bill Gates to donate Xbox Series X consoles to the Children's Hospital of Orange County along with 19 other children's hospitals throughout the country.

=== Merger with Rady Children’s Hospital ===
In November 2023, CHOC and Rady Children’s Hospital announced their intent to merge, aiming to form one of the largest pediatric healthcare systems in California.

This significant step was approved by the California Attorney General in November 2024, clearing the way for both institutions to align clinical operations, research efforts, and community outreach strategies under a single network. According to representatives from CHOC and Rady Children’s, the merger seeks to enhance the delivery of specialized pediatric care, increase access for families across Southern California, and streamline administrative processes.

In January 2025, it was announced that the merger between the two institutions had been completed. The merged company is now known as Rady Children's Health, and their first day was January 1, 2025.

== Awards ==
CHOC is consistently named one of the best children's hospitals in the U.S. by U.S. News & World Report.

CHOC earned the Gold Level CAPE Award from the California Council of Excellence, the only children's hospital in California to ever earn this distinction, and was awarded Magnet designation, the highest honor bestowed to hospitals for nursing excellence.

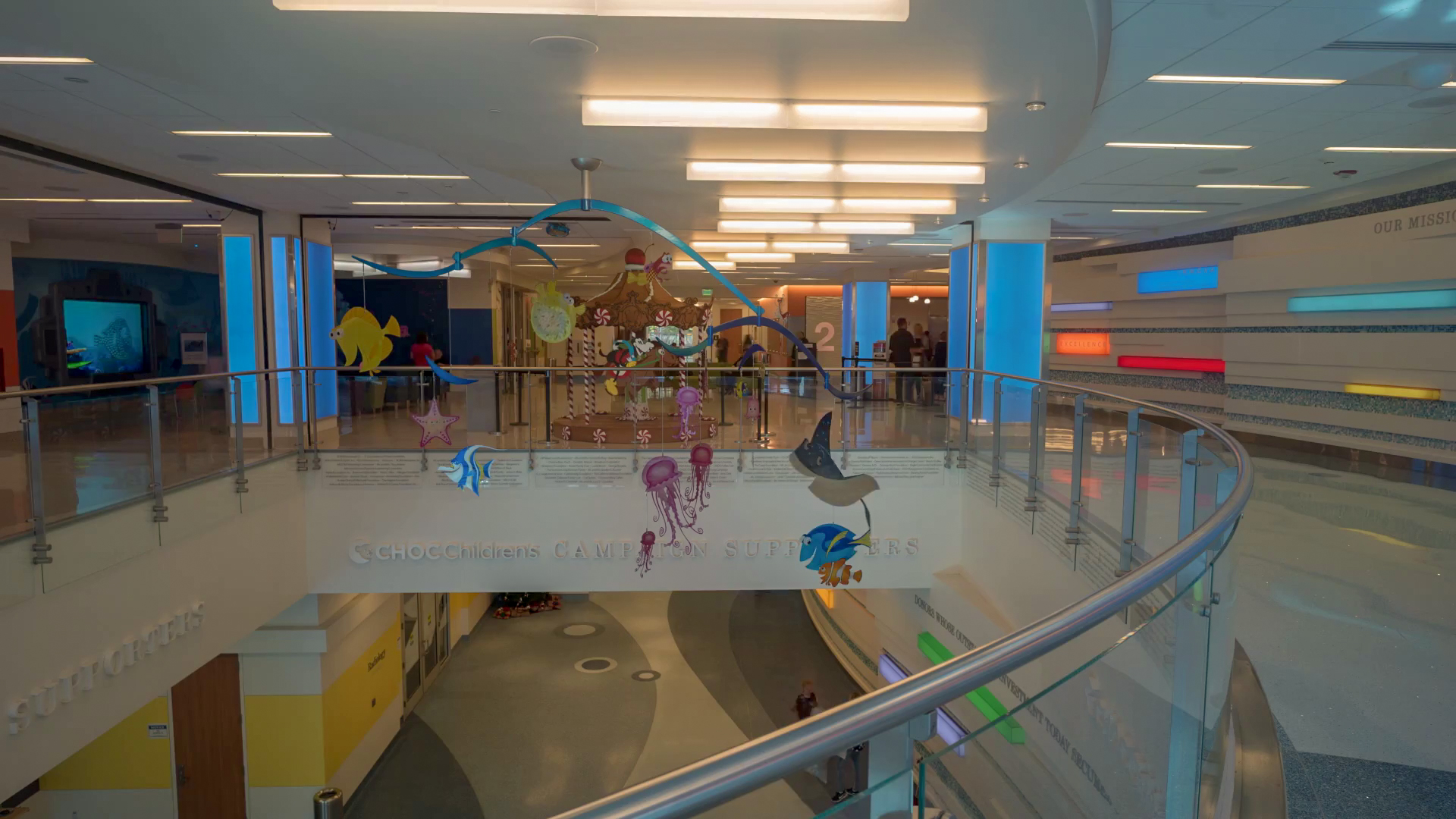
Lobby of the Children's Hospital of Orange County.

In 2017, the ED was the recipient of the Lantern Award from the Emergency Nurses Association for exceptional and innovative performance in leadership, practice, education, advocacy, and research.

As of 2021-22, Children's Hospital of Orange County has placed nationally in 7 ranked pediatric specialties on U.S. News & World Report. The hospital is also ranks as #6 in California children's hospitals.

2021-22 U.S. News & World Report Rankings for CHOC
Specialty	Rank (In the U.S.)	Score (Out of 100)
Neonatology	#32	81.0
Pediatric Cancer	#24	78.5
Pediatric Diabetes & Endocrinology	#14	75.7
Pediatric Neurology & Neurosurgery	#31	77.0
Pediatric Orthopedics	#20	74.3
Pediatric Pulmonology & Lung Surgery	#27	76.0
Pediatric Urology	#30	60.6
