= California Water Service =

Utility company in California

- Company type: Subsidiary
- Industry: Utilities; Water and wastewater
- Founded: 1926
- Headquarters: San Jose, California, United States
- Area served: California
- Products: Water
- Parent: California Water Service Group
- Website: calwater.com

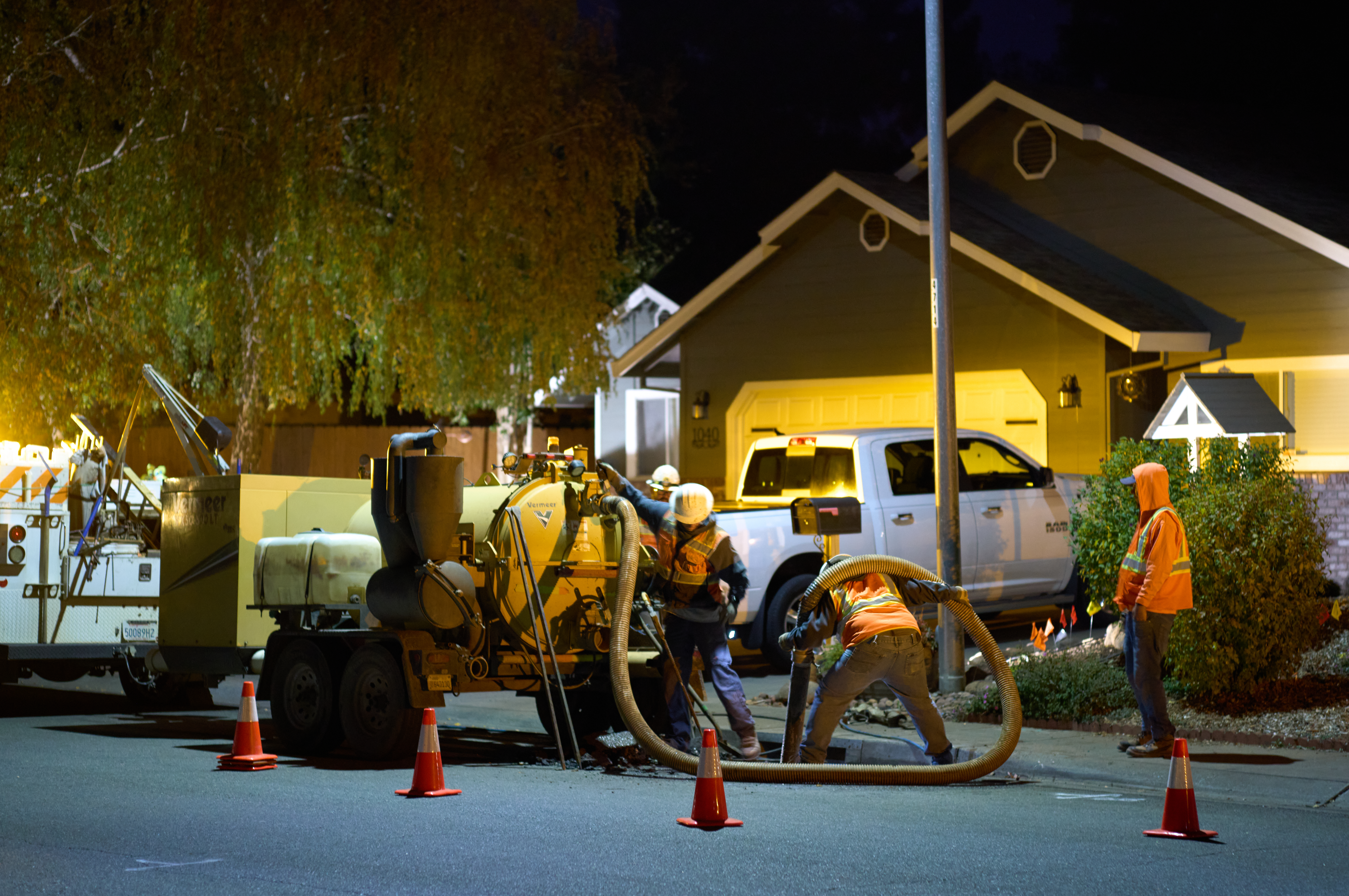
Employees of California Water Service during a nighttime repair job in West Chico

California Water Service, commonly known as Cal Water, is an American company providing drinking water and wastewater services to a number of regions within the state of California. It was founded in 1926 and is based in San Jose, California, and provides service across multiple local districts, reaching more than 484,900 customers.

== Origins ==
California Water Service Company started in 1926 through the acquisition of five separate water systems:

- Chico Water Supply Company October 14, 1926
- Visalia City Water Company October 15, 1926
- Bakersfield Water Works October 15, 1926
- Electric Water Company (Bakersfield) October 15, 1926
- Fresno City Water Company October 18, 1926

== Growth ==
The company experienced rapid growth post World War II. At the end of the war, the company had 105,110 service connections. 15 years later, in 1960, it had grown to 233,197 customers. This was a 5.5% annual growth rate during this time reflecting the rapid urbanization of California.

In 1997, California Water Service formed a new parent holding company, California Water Service Group, in order to expand its service coverage into other regions and states. Shortly thereafter it made a major expansion into Southern California with the purchase of Dominguez Services Corp. for $53 million, incorporating its subsidiaries Antelope Valley Water Co. and Kern River Valley Water Co. into Cal Water's service districts.

== Districts ==
Cal Water service areas are broken down into 23 districts:

- Antelope Valley
- Bakersfield
- Bayshore
- Bear Gulch
- Chico
- Dixon
- East Los Angeles
- Kern River Valley
- King City
- Livermore
- Los Altos
- Marysville
- Oroville
- Rancho Dominguez
- Redwood Valley
- Salinas
- Selma
- Stockton
- Tesoro Viejo
- Travis
- Visalia
- Westlake
- Willows

== Water Supplies ==
Cal Water districts employ a wide range of water sources, including surface water diversion, groundwater pumping, and purchase from other water suppliers such as the San Francisco Public Utilities Commission's regional water system.

In 2019, a plan for Cal Water's Chico District to purchase water supply from Paradise Irrigation District in the aftermath of the 2018 Camp Fire was cancelled in the study phase.

== Treatment Facilities ==
Cal Water's Willows District installed in 2016 a treatment system to reduce hexavalent chromium in the local water supply using the first strong-base ion exchange treatment system of its type in the United States.
