= Sea View League =

High school athletic league in California, United States

The Sea View League, along with the South Coast League in Orange County, California, make up the ten member high schools of the Coast View Athletic Association, which is part of the California Interscholastic Federation's Southern Section.

For the 2024–25 academic year, the member schools of the Sea View League are:

- Baseball
  - Mission Viejo
  - El Toro
  - San Clemente
  - San Juan Hills
  - Beckman Arnold
- Basketball, Boys
  - Dana Hills
  - El Toro
  - Laguna Hills
  - San Juan Hills
  - Tesoro
- Basketball, Girls
  - Capistrano Valley
  - El Toro
  - Laguna Hills
  - Mission Viejo
  - San Juan Hills
- Cross Country, Boys (2025-2026)
  - Arnold O. Beckman
  - Capistrano Valley
  - Dana Hills
  - El Toro
  - San Clemente
- Cross Country, Girls
  - Arnold O. Beckman
  - Aliso Niguel
  - Laguna Hills
  - San Clemente
  - San Juan Hills
  - Tesoro
- Football (11 man)
  - Aliso Niguel
  - Dana Hills
  - Capistrano Valley
  - El Toro
  - Trabuco Hills
- Golf, Boys
  - Aliso Niguel
  - El Toro
  - Laguna Hills
  - San Juan Hills
  - Trabuco Hills
- Golf, Girls
  - Capistrano Valley
  - El Toro
  - Laguna Hills
  - Mission Viejo
  - Tesoro
- Lacrosse, Boys
  - Aliso Niguel
  - Dana Hills
  - Laguna Hills
  - San Juan Hills
- Lacrosse, Girls
  - Capistrano Valley
  - Dana Hills
  - El Toro
  - Laguna Hills
  - Mission Viejo
- Soccer, Boys
  - Aliso Niguel
  - Dana Hills
  - Laguna Hills
  - Tesoro
  - Trabuco Hills
- Soccer, Girls
  - Capistrano Valley
  - El Toro
  - Laguna Hills
  - Mission Viejo
  - Trabuco Hills
- Softball
  - Capistrano Valley
  - El Toro
  - San Clemente
  - Tesoro
  - Trabuco Hills
- Swimming & Diving, Boys
  - Capistrano Valley
  - El Toro
  - Mission Viejo
  - San Juan Hills
  - Trabuco Hills
- Swimming & Diving, Girls
  - Capistrano Valley
  - El Toro
  - Mission Viejo
  - San Juan Hills
  - Trabuco Hills
- Tennis, Boys
  - Capistrano Valley
  - Laguna Hills
  - Mission Viejo
  - San Juan Hills
  - Trabuco Hills
- Tennis, Girls
  - El Toro
  - Laguna Hills
  - Mission Viejo
  - San Juan Hills
  - Trabuco Hills
- Track & Field, Boys
  - Capistrano Valley
  - Laguna Hills
  - San Clemente
  - San Juan Hills
  - Tesoro
- Track & Field, Girls
  - Capistrano Valley
  - Laguna Hills
  - San Clemente
  - San Juan Hills
  - Tesoro
- Volleyball, Boys
  - Capistrano Valley
  - El Toro
  - Laguna Hills
  - Mission Viejo
  - San Juan Hills
- Volleyball, Girls
  - Capistrano Valley
  - Laguna Hills
  - Mission Viejo
  - San Clemente
  - Tesoro
- Water Polo, Boys
  - Aliso Niguel
  - Capistrano Valley
  - Laguna Hills
  - Mission Viejo
  - Trabuco Hills
- Water Polo, Girls
  - Capistrano Valley
  - Laguna Hills
  - Mission Viejo
  - San Juan Hills
  - Trabuco Hills
- Wrestling
  - Capistrano Valley
  - Mission Viejo
  - San Clemente
  - Tesoro
- Wrestling, Girls
  - Capistrano Valley
  - Mission Viejo
  - San Clemente
  - Tesoro

== Football ==
As of 2022-23, the football membership of the league consists of:

- Aliso Niguel High School
- El Toro High School
- San Juan Hills High School
- Trabuco Hills High School

== Athletic league officers ==
The Sea View League is an athletic conference made up of similar schools located in Orange County, California.

- President: Terri Gusiff, Principal, El Toro High School
- Secretary: Teri Durst, Secretary, El Toro High School
- League Compliance Officer: Chad Addison, athletic director, Capistrano Valley High School
- League Coordinator: Armando Rivas, athletic director, El Toro High School
- Counsel Representative: Craig Collins, Principal, Trabuco Hills High School
