= El Toro High School =

Location
- 25255 Toledo Way; Lake Forest, California 92630; United States; 33°38′15″N 117°41′20″W

Information
- Type: Public high school
- Established: 1973; 53 years ago
- School district: Saddleback Valley Unified School District
- Principal: Dr. Jimmy Martin
- Grades: 9–12
- Enrollment: 1,972 (2023–2024)
- Campus: Suburban
- Colors: Royal Blue; Gold
- Athletics conference: CIF Southern Section; Coast View Athletic Association
- Nickname: Chargers
- Website: www.svusd.org/schools/high-schools/el-toro

El Toro High School is a public high school in Lake Forest, California, United States. It is one of five high schools in the Saddleback Valley Unified School District (SVUSD) and serves Lake Forest as well as its district of Portola Hills and a small portion of east Irvine and northern Mission Viejo. Students living in Foothill Ranch, which is zoned to Trabuco Hills High School may choose to attend El Toro out of convenience. "El Toro" was the name of the community from the 1870s until a referendum in 1991. The school has served the area since 1973.

== History ==
El Toro began participating in the International Baccalaureate Program in 2004. The program was scheduled to end in 2011 because of district and state budget cuts, but it was slated to continue into 2012 school year.

During the 2007 California wildfires, more specifically the Santiago Fire, Governor Arnold Schwarzenegger made a speech at El Toro High School It was also used as an evacuation center.

During the 2020 California wildfires, more specifically during the Silverado Fire, El Toro High School was again used as an evacuation center for those that were impacted in Foothill Ranch, Lake Forest, and Portola Hills.

The high school is also the home of the "El Toro 20 Stair," which became a notable spot for skateboarding, and many high-profile tricks were filmed at the stairs.

== Notable alumni ==
- Christina Smith (1975), Playmate Playboy Centerfold for March 1978
- Diane Murphy (1981), Actress, best known for her role in Bewitched
- Erin Murphy (1981), Actress, best known for her role in Bewitched
- Robin Holmes-Sullivan (1982), psychologist, president of Lewis & Clark College
- Mike Piel (1983), former NFL defensive end
- Scott Miller (1986), former NFL wide receiver
- Brian Krause (1987), actor
- Scott Ross (1987), former NFL linebacker
- Marc Stein (1987), sports reporter who covers the NBA
- Kristy Swanson (1987), actress known for Buffy the Vampire Slayer
- Adrien Beard (1988), Storyboard Artist and Voice actor on South Park
- Ryan Tinsley (1989), former MLS player
- Steve Stenstrom (1990), former NFL quarterback
- Rob Johnson (1991), former NFL quarterback
- Horse the Band (1998), Metalcore band
- Lauren Hanson (1999), former USWNT soccer player and college coach
- Kaitlin Sandeno (2001), Olympic Gold Medal winning swimmer
- Austin Romine (2007), former MLB catcher
- Nolan Arenado (2009), MLB All-Star third baseman for the Arizona Diamondbacks
- Lauren Chamberlain (2011), former WPF softball player
- Matt Chapman (2011), MLB All-Star third baseman for the San Francisco Giants
- Jordan Faison (2012), basketball player who plays overseas
- Mikenna McManus (2017), NWSL soccer player
- Nathan Church (2018), MLB outfielder for the St. Louis Cardinals
- Erik Tolman (2018), MLB pitcher for the Washington Nationals
- Paul Skenes (2020), MLB All-Star pitcher for the Pittsburgh Pirates
