= Capistrano Valley High School =

Coordinates: 33°32′29″N 117°40′11″W

Location
- 26301 Via Escolar; Mission Viejo, California 92692; United States

Information
- Type: Public
- Established: 1977
- School district: Capistrano Unified School District
- Staff: 94.72 (FTE)
- Grades: 9-12
- Enrollment: 1,981 (2023-2024)
- Student to teacher ratio: 20.91
- Colors: Black & Gold
- Athletics conference: CIF Southern Section; Coast View Athletic Association
- Nickname: Cougars
- Newspaper: Capistrano Valley High School Times
- Website: www.cvhs.com

Capistrano Valley High School (often called CVHS or Capo) is a public high school at the southern border of Mission Viejo, California, USA, that is run by the Capistrano Unified School District. It is set on a hilltop overlooking the San Diego Freeway (I-5) corridor and Saddleback Mountain. It is located on Via Escolar, off the Avery exit of the I-5. The school attendance boundaries primarily serve students from eastern, southern and northern Mission Viejo (the entire portion of the city in CUSD) and a small northern portion of San Juan Capistrano.

CVHS is a California Distinguished School, National Blue Ribbon Finalist, and was ranked as number 488 in Newsweek's 2008 list of the top 1,300 high schools in the USA. By this standard, CVHS falls in the top 2.5% of US high schools. It is the highest ranked for the school district and second highest rank between both Saddleback Valley and Capistrano Unified that serve south Orange County.

== History ==
CVHS opened in 1977 with one main building and a series of portable buildings that served as temporary classrooms, and 1,326 students. It was the third high school to be opened in Capistrano Unified School District after San Clemente and Dana Hills. The campus and buildings have since expanded; notable additions include two wings attached to the original main building, a pool, a gym, theater and a two-story M Building.

CVHS experienced several population shifts as the district opened the new schools of Aliso Niguel and Tesoro with the building boom in southern Orange County. Student attendance shifted between these schools as district boundaries were re-drawn with each new school addition. The 2006-2007 school year was the last year that San Juan Capistrano freshmen students enrolled at CVHS. In the 2007-2008 school year, most SJC freshmen attended the district's new San Juan Hills High School. A few San Juan Capistrano students who live close to the Mission Viejo/San Juan city borders continue to attend CVHS.

There was controversy over the addition of San Juan Hills High School which would serve San Juan Capistrano, and CVHS would serve solely Mission Viejo with the new boundaries the district settled on. In the 2005-2006 school year, over 2,800 students attended CVHS. The freshman class that entered in 2006 was the largest ever.

Due to ongoing problems at San Juan Hills High School, Capistrano Unified appointed CVHS Principal Tom Ressler to that campus after 22 years at Capistrano Valley. Ressler began his job at SJHHS in fall 2008. The current principal is Mr. John Misustin.

The average class size is 34 students. There are 93 teachers and 90 have a full credential. 4.3% of the teachers hold doctorates, 52% hold a master's degree.

== Facilities ==
Capistrano Valley has a type of brick architecture, seldom seen in the stucco pop up buildings that cover most of Southern California. There is a main building that has two story wings projecting from the main indoor quad area known as the "mall". From the mall are the administration offices, the food service area, the teachers' lounge, all centered by a stage where music and games are played during events like spirit week or before a school dance.

CVHS' second wings branch from an open area that is centered on a two-story library and career center. The Activities office is located in this hall. The school has six computer labs and 400 desktop computers for student use.

Arrangements of Main Building: Off the main mall/quad of the school are the A, B, and C wings. The A wing is to the left of the main entrance and is home to the administration, guidance, and attendance offices. The B wing is located to the right of the main entrance and has all fine art classrooms and music rooms. The C wing has eight classrooms that are electives and ROP courses like auto shop, photography, dance, and drama. Adjacent to the mall is an open area with a career center in the center. Off this area are the D, J, and E wings. The D wing has eight science classrooms and a greenhouse. The J wing has foreign language classes and a computer lab. The E wing consists of six math classrooms and a computer lab. On the lower level surrounding the library are the H, K, F, and G wings. The H wing has twelve social science classrooms, the K wing has foreign language classrooms, and the F wing has thirteen English classrooms. The G wing is for special education and is in a more separate area with individualized rooms. The K wing is often considered "rave-like" because of how busy it is due to sharp turns in the internal architecture.

Arrangement of Outside Buildings: In addition to the main building, a two-story brick building was built in 2006 called the "M Building". It replaced sixteen older portable classrooms. The M Building has social science classrooms, four state of the art science rooms, and math classrooms. Next to the M building and towards the main school building, there is a large, well maintained theater for performing arts (built in 2013). Off the upper level "senior parking lot" are 20 portable classrooms. These rooms are primarily English classrooms, but there is a mix of math, science, and ROP classes as well.

There are two gyms, the "large gym" and "small gym", that were newly remodeled in 2006. Capistrano Valley has 180, 768 square feet (71.3 m^{2}) in permanent buildings and 19, 680 square feet (63 m^{2}) in relocatable buildings. There are 200, 448 square feet (41.6 m^{2}) of buildings on the entire campus. Capistrano Valley has the least amount of square footage in portable buildings of the district high schools, and also the least amount of total square footage (though this school has the lowest enrollment in the district).

CVHS also boasts one of the largest high school swimming pools at 50 meters long. There are three soccer fields, six tennis courts, two softball fields, two baseball fields and a turf football field and track in the stadium.

== Academics ==
CVHS is one of two high schools in Capistrano Unified School District and one of 180 in the USA and Canada to be an International Baccalaureate School. Since 1995, it is also home to the Academy of Technology, Math, and Science (ATMS), a challenging program intended to serve and promote students who have demonstrated exceptional ability, interest, and/or aptitude in the areas of mathematics, science, or technology.

Elective choices at CVHS are include 4-year elective sequences in Environmental Engineering, Product Design and Development, Spanish for Spanish Speakers, and AVID, among others.

CVHS, in collaboration with other high schools in the Capistrano Unified School District such as Dana Hills High School and San Juan Hills High School, competes in the FIRST Robotics Competition as Team 5199, the "Robot Dolphins From Outer Space".

The school has a strong Model United Nations program that functions as a student-operated club and an elective class. MUN emulates the activities of the real United Nations, with students representing delegates from nations all over the world who discuss, debate, and propose solutions to international issues.

Counselors work with students to help them stay college bound if that is their desire. Strong emphasis is put on both career and college preparatory courses. CVHS is part of the AAA (Accelerated Academic Achievement) Program. The school's API is 843, making it a CA Exemplary High School.

CVHS is the district's northern magnet campus due to the presence of the International Baccalaureate (IB) program and the most established AP programs in the northern portion of the district. CVHS has had a pass rate of 96% for IB.

18 AP courses are offered in: English Language and Composition, English Literature and Composition, Biology, Chemistry, Environmental Science, Physics, World History, European History, American History, American Government and Politics, Economics, History of Art, Psychology, Statistics, Calculus, French, German, and Spanish.

15 IB courses are offered as: English III SL, English IV HL, Biology HL, Physics SL, History of the Americas HL, Math Studies SL, Mathematics SL, Mathematics HL, French SL, German SL, Spanish ScL, Spanish HL, Psychology SL, and Visual Arts SL.

Capistrano Valley is accredited by the Western Association of Schools and Colleges (WASC).

== Fine arts department ==
The Capistrano Valley Marching Band, known throughout Southern California as the Black and Gold Brigade, participates in competitive field tournaments, parades and home football games. The ensemble consists of woodwind, brass, colorguard, pit and drumline.

The Black and Gold Brigade currently competes in the SCJA (Southern California Judges Association) 3A division and has qualified for all SCJA championships since 2002. The marching band earned first place in the 2A division in 2002. It also won first place in the 1A division in 2006 for colorguard, band, visual, and percussion categories.

The Black and Gold Brigade has back to back SCJA state championships, taking 2009 State Champs, as well as Most Outstanding Solosit (Jeremy Burciaga, Trumpet), High Music, and High Overall. The Black and Gold Brigade also has taken 2010 State Champs, with High (Best) Music, High (Best) Visual, High (Best) General (Overall Effect), and High (Best) Percussion.

The winter guard team placed first in division AA at the Winter Guard Association of Southern California contest at Tesoro High School in February 2007. In the championships, the team placed sixth in "Intermediate Yellow A" at CVHS in April 2007.

On October 13, 2007, the Black and Gold Brigade came in first place for Auxiliary, Music, and Drumline categories at the prestigious Poway Marching Band Invitational in Division 2A. On October 11, 2008, the Black and Gold Brigade came in first place for Percussion, Visual, and Drum Major categories at the Fullerton High School Marching Band Competition. Also during the event, they won 1st place in their division

This year, Capistrano Valley High School has two wind bands and three string orchestras. The top band and top orchestra also double as an IB music class, exposing the students to ethnomusicology and music theory. There is also a blog for CVHS music and all of the classes included in that category at . It offers CVHS students or anybody in general to talk about the musical classes held at Capistrano Valley High School and any interests that those people might have about music in general. The Drama Department is accompanied by Capo Valley's two choirs. The chamber choir or top group is called Madrigals. The other is CV Choir, which is the entry level choir, turning down no applicants.

Students can join a variety of other music classes like jazz band. Also in the spring is the spring musical where the orchestra, the band, the choir, and drama are combined to perform a popular musical. CVHS also has an active ComedySportz team, which competes with other local schools in improvisation-based games.

== Notable alumni ==
- Don August, former Major League Baseball pitcher for the Milwaukee Brewers
- Brandon Brennan, Major League Baseball pitcher for the Seattle Mariners
- Ian Calderon, member of the California State Assembly
- Heather Cox, American Sportscaster
- Brad Davis, Former MLB catcher for the Florida Marlins
- Delacey, American singer and songwriter
- Eric Fox, former Major League Baseball player (Oakland Athletics, Texas Rangers)
- Kina Grannis, singer/songwriter whose songs have been played during the Super Bowl and episodes of General Hospital.
- Jordan Harvey, Defender for LAFC. Professional soccer player
- Kyle Hendricks, Major League Baseball pitcher.
- Olja Knežević, Montenegrin novelist
- Jack Larsen, Major League Baseball player (Seattle Mariners)
- Malaefou MacKenzie, former University of Southern California and NFL running back
- Todd Marinovich, former University of Southern California and Los Angeles Raiders quarterback
- Tyler Matzek, Major League Baseball pitcher.
- Jennifer Muñoz, former professional soccer player
- Brandon Puffer, former Major League Baseball player (Houston Astros, San Diego Padres, San Francisco Giants)
- Michael Ramirez, Pulitzer Prize-winning editorial cartoonist. Ramirez illustrated the school's 1979 class yearbook.
- Matt Scoggin, (Class of 1981), University of Texas swimmer, 1992 Barcelona Olympic 10 meter Platform diving competitor, and 30 year diving coach for the University of Texas.
- William Tell, musician (Something Corporate and solo)
- Randy Torres, Guitarist for the band Project 86
- Zach Kennedy, Bass player for the band Saosin
- Sandun Wijemanne Nissanka, music & tech entrepreneur
- Rachael Cantu, musician

== Controversy ==
=== Litigation ===
Capistrano Valley has figured in several notable legal controversies over its history.

=== Peloza vs. Capistrano Unified School District ===
In a case that drew national media attention, biology teacher John Peloza was accused of proselytizing and teaching creationism instead of evolution, in violation of the state curriculum. Peloza gave a student a Bible and told another Jewish student that she would go to hell if she did not convert to Christianity.

Peloza was not fired, but was reprimanded by the principal and ordered to teach evolution and refrain from proselytizing. Peloza sued the school district in federal court, as well as several teachers and administrators, including principal Thomas R. Anthony; vice-principal Ross Velderraine, history teachers James Corbett and Paul Pflueger, and science teachers Ray Panici and William Redding. In addition to state tort claims, Peloza alleged that the school district unconstitutionally required him to teach "evolutionism" and that evolutionism is a religious belief system. He also alleged that the defendants attempted by harassment and intimidation to force him to teach evolutionism because of a class-based animus against practicing Christians in violation of 42 U.S.C. § 1985(3). Peloza asked for 5 million dollars in damages. Peloza received assistance from the Rutherford Institute and the American Center for Law and Justice.

Finding the lawsuit frivolous, a United States district court judge dismissed Peloza's lawsuit on January 16, 1992, awarding attorney's fees to the defendants. Peloza was reassigned to teach physical education instead of science. On October 4, 1994 the Ninth Circuit Court of Appeals upheld the dismissal of Peloza's lawsuit, but reversed the award of attorney's fees. The Supreme Court of the United States refused to hear Peloza's appeal in 1995. Peloza was relocated to teach physical education in the Capistrano Unified School District at Newhart Middle School. He later retired due to an injury among other reasons.

=== Farnan vs. Capistrano Unified School District ===
In another case that has drawn national media coverage, on December 12, 2007 Chad Farnan, a student, represented by the Advocates for Faith and Freedom, a conservative Christian legal advocacy group, filed suit against 19-year AP European History teacher Dr. James Corbett. The suit alleges that Corbett had violated the First Amendment's Establishment Clause that prohibits government from advancing religion or promoting hostility toward religion.

The lawsuit, which seeks unspecified damages and attorney fees, alleges that Corbett typically spent "a large portion of class time propagating his personal views to a captive audience," including criticism of Christianity and traditional Christian viewpoints on topics such as birth control, teenage sex, homosexuality and erectile dysfunction. In response to the lawsuit, numerous former students of Corbett defended him, holding a protest at the school and forming support groups.

In March, U.S. District Court Judge James Selna denied the district's motion to dismiss. Shortly after the suit was filed, the California Teachers Association intervened as defendants under FRCP 24(b). On August 19, 2011, the Federal Ninth Circuit of Appeals vacated the lower court's finding against Corbett and the school district. The plaintiffs appealed to the US Supreme Court, which declined to hear the case. Corbett continued to teach at Capistrano Valley High School until his retirement in 2016.
