= Blake Sabol =

American baseball player (born 1998)

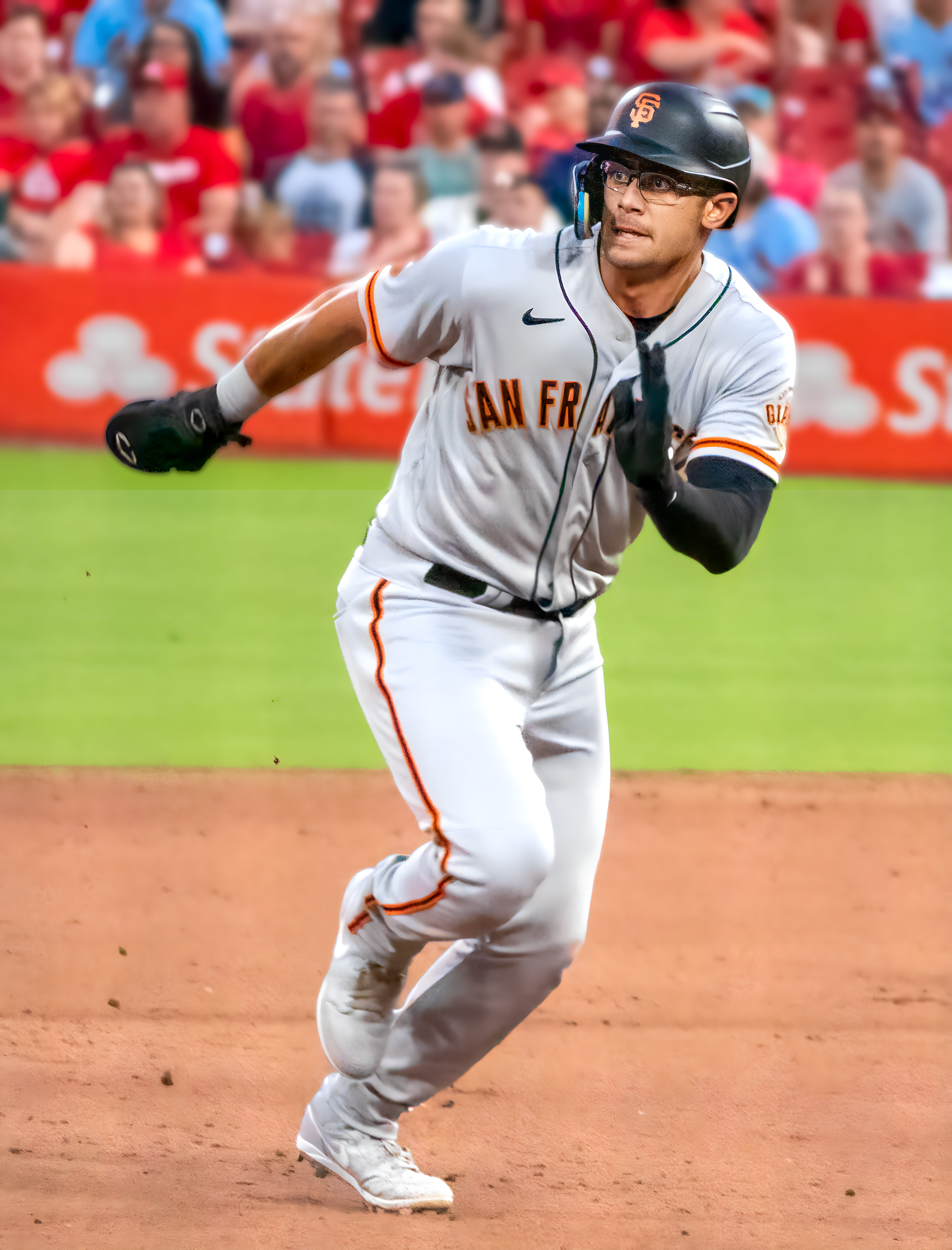
- Sabol with the Giants in 2023

Free agent
- Catcher / Outfielder
- Born: January 7, 1998 (age 28); Aliso Viejo, California, U.S.
- Bats: Left Throws: Right

MLB debut
- March 30, 2023, for the San Francisco Giants

MLB statistics (through 2025 season)
- Batting average: .237
- Home runs: 13
- Runs batted in: 46
- Stats at Baseball Reference

Teams
- San Francisco Giants (2023–2024); Boston Red Sox (2025)

Blake Joseph Sabol (born January 7, 1998) is an American professional baseball catcher and outfielder who is a free agent. He has previously played in Major League Baseball (MLB) for the San Francisco Giants and Boston Red Sox. He played college baseball at the University of Southern California. The Pittsburgh Pirates selected Sabol in the seventh round of the 2019 MLB draft. He made his MLB debut in 2023.

== Early life ==
Sabol was born and raised in Aliso Viejo, California, to Carmalita Brown and Rob Sabol. His father played college baseball at California State University, Long Beach. Sabol's older brother, Stefan, played catcher in college baseball at the University of Oregon and in the New York Mets organization.

Sabol's mother is from American Samoa, and Sabol grew up among a Samoan community in California. Troy Polamalu, a member of the Pro Football Hall of Fame, is his second cousin; his mother used to babysit Polamalu.

== Amateur career ==
Sabol attended Aliso Niguel High School ('16) in Aliso Viejo. In high school he batted .338/.418/.498 with 11 home runs, 73 RBIs, and 43 stolen bases in 44 attempts in 126 games, playing catcher, outfield, and first base. He also played basketball and football in high school. He ran a 6.77 second 60-yard dash (in the 94th percentile for his class), and as a catcher had a 1.89 second pop time.

Sabol was named 2013 and 2014 All-Sea View League, and 2016 South Coast All-League. In 2013 he won a gold medal with the Team USA U15 National Team at the Pan Am Games, in 2015 Perfect Game USA rated him the No. 64 player in the nation in his class and seventh-best catcher, and Perfect Game named him a 2015 First Team Underclass All-American, and in 2016 Max Preps rated him the 23rd-best player in the nation for his class.

The Cleveland Indians selected Sabol in the 33rd round of the 2016 Major League Baseball draft, but he did not sign and instead enrolled at the University of Southern California (USC) to play college baseball for the USC Trojans. In 2017, he played collegiate summer baseball with the Wareham Gatemen of the Cape Cod Baseball League, and returned to the league in 2018 with the Chatham Anglers where he was named a league all-star after batting .340(4th in the league)/.445(7th)/.573(4th) in 103 at bats with 28 runs (5th), seven home runs (3rd), 21 walks (5th), and 14 stolen bases (2nd). As a junior in 2019, he played in 55 games and batted .268/.346/.368 in 231 at bats with 37 runs, three home runs, and 22 RBIs. In college on defense he played 70 games in left field, 55 games at catcher, and 12 in center field.

== Professional career ==
=== Pittsburgh Pirates ===
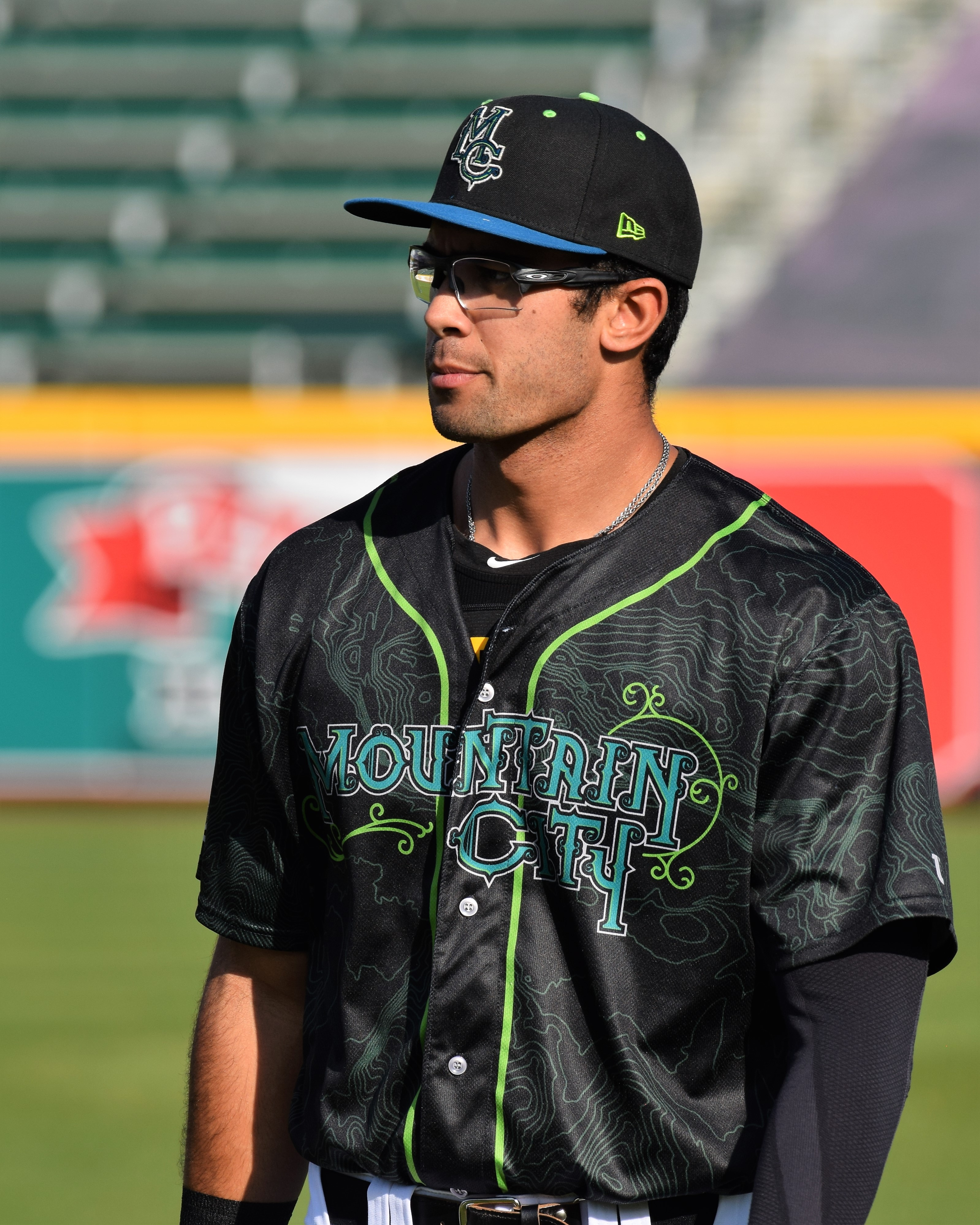
Sabol with the Altoona Curve in 2022.

The Pittsburgh Pirates selected Sabol in the seventh round of the 2019 Major League Baseball draft. He signed with the Pirates for a signing bonus of $247,500, and made his professional debut with the Low-A West Virginia Black Bears with whom he hit .245/.350/.351 in 208 at bats with two home runs and 22 RBIs over 57 games. On defense, he played 20 games in right field, 13 in left field, and 8 in center field.

He split the 2021 season between the Single-A Bradenton Marauders and the High-A Greensboro Grasshoppers, slashing .310/.406/.551 in 245 at bats with 13 home runs and 45 RBIs over 66 games. Between the two teams, he played 28 games at catcher, 12 in left field, and two in right field.

He opened the 2022 season with the Double-A Altoona Curve, and was promoted to the Triple-A Indianapolis Indians in late August. Over 123 games between the two teams, he slashed .284/.363/.497 in 447 at bats with 74 runs, 26 doubles, 19 home runs, and 75 RBIs. He was 5th in the Eastern League with five triples. Between the two teams, he played 66 games at catcher, 34 at DH, and 21 in left field. He played in the Arizona Fall League for the Surprise Saguaros after the season.

=== San Francisco Giants ===
On December 7, 2022, Sabol was selected by the Cincinnati Reds with the fourth overall pick in the Major League phase of the Rule 5 draft. He was then traded 90 minutes later to the San Francisco Giants in exchange for right-hander Jake Wong and cash considerations. Sabol joked: "Cincinnati Reds legend. Never lost a game in a Reds uniform."

The Giants were not able to send Sabol to the minor leagues in 2023 without offering him back to the Pirates. On March 26, 2023, after he batted .348 with a 1.105 OPS in spring training, it was announced that Sabol made San Francisco's Opening Day roster. In 110 games for San Francisco, Sabol hit .236/.301/.394 with 13 home runs and 44 RBI.

Sabol was optioned to the Triple–A Sacramento River Cats to begin the 2024 season. He made 11 appearances for San Francisco, slashing .313/.421/.375 with no home runs and one RBI. On January 11, 2025, Sabol was designated for assignment following the signing of Justin Verlander.

=== Boston Red Sox ===
On January 15, 2025, the Giants traded Sabol to the Boston Red Sox in exchange for international bonus pool space. He was optioned to the Triple-A Worcester Red Sox to begin the season. On April 8, Sabol was called up to the Red Sox after starting catcher Connor Wong was placed on the 10-day injured list. In eight appearances for Boston, he went 2-for-16 (.125) with one RBI and one walk. On June 1, Sabol was designated for assignment by the Red Sox. He cleared waivers and was sent outright to Triple-A Worcester on June 5.

=== Chicago White Sox ===
On July 12, 2025, Sabol was traded to the Chicago White Sox in exchange for cash considerations; he was subsequently assigned to the Triple-A Charlotte Knights. He made 23 appearances for Charlotte, batting .216/.326/.378 with three home runs and 13 RBI. Sabol was released by the White Sox organization on November 5.

=== Tampa Bay Rays ===
On January 7, 2026, Sabol signed a minor league contract with the Tampa Bay Rays. He spent the 2026 season with the Triple-A Durham Bulls and batted .244 with 11 home runs and 41 RBI over 101 games. He elected free agency on November 2.

== See also ==
- Rule 5 draft results
