= South Coast League (California) =

High school athletic league in California

The South Coast League, along with the Sea View League in Orange County, California, make up the ten member high schools of the Coast View Athletic Association, which is part of the California Interscholastic Federation's Southern Section (CIF Southern Section). For the 2017-18 academic year, the member schools of the South Coast League are:

== Sports ==
- Baseball
  - Capistrano Valley
  - Dana Hills
  - El Toro
  - Mission Viejo
  - Tesoro
- Basketball, Boys
  - Aliso Niguel
  - Capistrano Valley
  - Mission Viejo
  - San Clemente
  - Trabuco Hills
- Basketball, Girls
  - Aliso Niguel
  - Dana Hills
  - San Clemente
  - Tesoro
  - Trabuco Hills
- Cross Country, Boys
  - Alison Niguel
  - Dana Hills
  - El Toro
  - Mission Viejo
  - San Juan Hills
- Cross Country, Girls
  - Capistrano Valley
  - Dana Hills
  - El Toro
  - Mission Viejo
  - Trabuco Hills
- Football (11 man)
  - San Juan Hills
  - Mission Viejo
  - San Clemente
  - Tesoro
- Golf, Boys
  - Capistrano Valley
  - Dana Hills
  - Mission Viejo
  - San Clemente
  - Tesoro
- Golf, Girls
  - Aliso Niguel
  - Dana Hills
  - San Clemente
  - San Juan Hills
  - Trabuco Hills
- Lacrosse, Boys
  - El Toro
  - Mission Viejo
  - San Clemente
  - Tesoro
  - Trabuco Hills
- Lacrosse, Girls
  - Aliso Niguel
  - San Clemente
  - San Juan Hills
  - Tesoro
  - Trabuco Hills
- Soccer, Boys
  - Capistrano Valley
  - El Toro
  - Mission Viejo
  - San Clemente
  - San Juan Hills
- Soccer, Girls
  - Aliso Niguel
  - Dana Hills
  - San Clemente
  - San Juan Hills
  - Tesoro
- Softball
  - Aliso Niguel
  - Dana Hills
  - Laguna Hills
  - Mission Viejo
  - San Juan Hills
- Swimming & Diving, Boys
  - Aliso Niguel
  - Dana Hills
  - Laguna Hills
  - San Clemente
  - Tesoro
- Swimming & Diving, Girls
  - Aliso Niguel
  - Dana Hills
  - Laguna Hills
  - San Clemente
  - Tesoro
- Tennis, Boys
  - Aliso Niguel
  - Dana Hills
  - El Toro
  - San Clemente
  - Tesoro
- Tennis, Girls
  - Aliso Niguel
  - Capistrano Valley
  - Dana Hills
  - San Clemente
  - Tesoro
- Track & Field, Boys
  - Aliso Niguel
  - Dana Hills
  - El Toro
  - Mission Viejo
  - Trabuco Hills
- Track & Field, Girls
  - Aliso Niguel
  - Dana Hills
  - El Toro
  - Mission Viejo
  - Trabuco Hills
- Volleyball, Boys
  - Aliso Niguel
  - Dana Hills
  - San Clemente
  - Tesoro
  - Trabuco Hills
- Volleyball, Girls
  - Aliso Niguel
  - Dana Hills
  - El Toro
  - San Juan Hills
  - Trabuco Hills
- Water Polo, Boys
  - Dana Hills
  - El Toro
  - San Clemente
  - San Juan Hills
  - Tesoro
- Water Polo, Girls
  - Aliso Niguel
  - Dana Hills
  - El Toro
  - San Clemente
  - Trabuco Hills
- Wrestling
  - Aliso Niguel
  - Dana Hills
  - El Toro
  - Laguna Hills
  - Trabuco Hills
- Wrestling, Girls
  - Aliso Niguel
  - Dana Hills
  - El Toro
  - Laguna Hills
  - Trabuco Hills

== Football ==
As of 2022-23, the football membership of the league consists of:

- Capistrano Valley High School
- Mission Viejo High School
- San Clemente High School
- Tesoro High School

== Athletic league officers ==
The South Coast League is an athletic conference made up of similar schools located in Orange County, California.

- President: Terri Gusiff, Principal, El Toro High School
- Secretary: Chad Addison, Athletic Director, Capistrano Valley High School
- League Coordinator: Armando Rivas, Athletic Director, El Toro High School
- Compliance Officer: Andrew Mashburn, Athletic Director, Aliso Niguel High School
- Counsel Representative: Chris Carter, Principal, San Clemente Hills High School
