= Coast View Athletic Association =

High school athletic league in California, United States

The Coast View Athletic Association is a high school athletic league that is part of the CIF Southern Section. It is an amalgamation of the Sea View League and the South Coast Leagues.

== Members ==
- Aliso Niguel High School
- Beckman High School
- Capistrano Valley High School
- Dana Hills High School
- El Toro High School
- Mission Viejo High School
- San Clemente High School
- San Juan Hills High School
- Tesoro High School
- Trabuco Hills High School
