= Lake Forest, California =

City in California, United States

- City
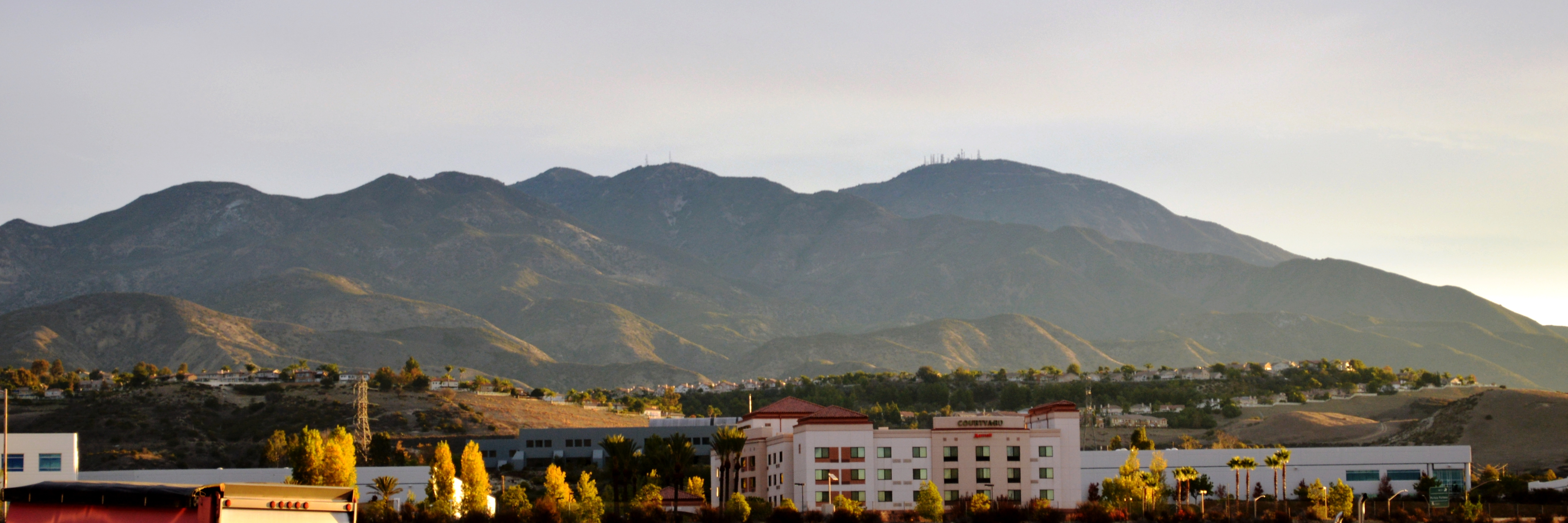
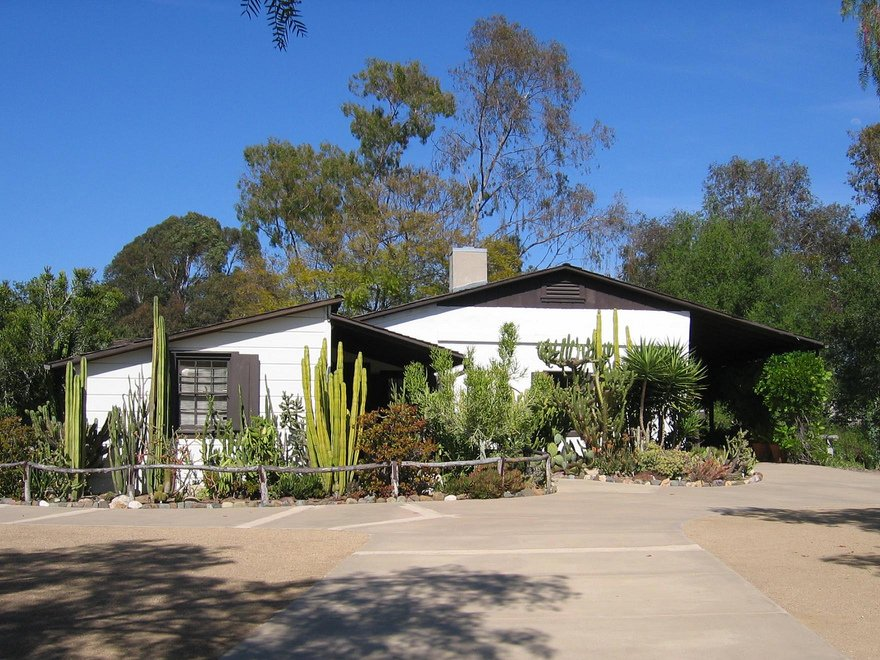
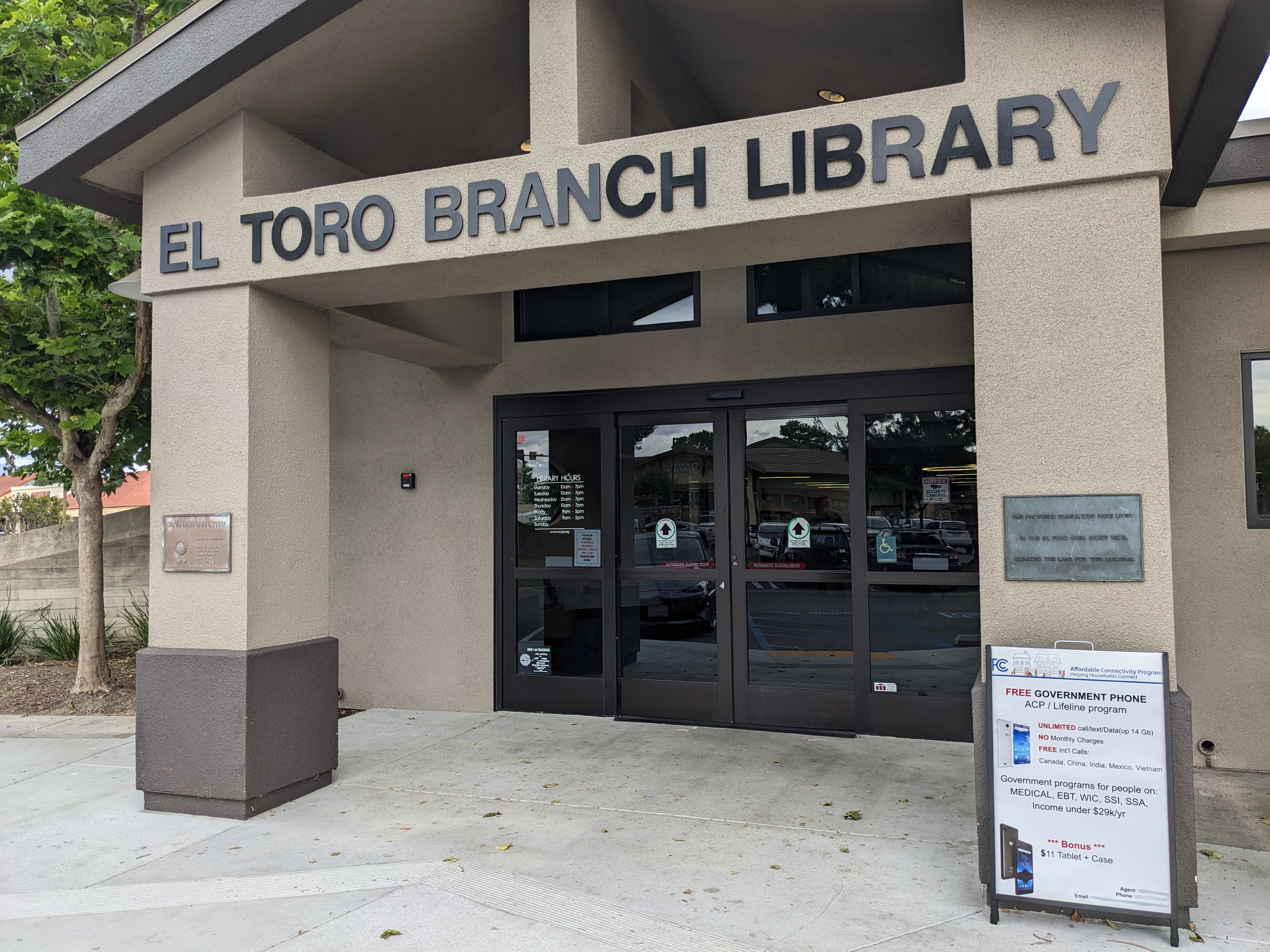
- View of Lake Forest José Serrano Adobe El Toro Library

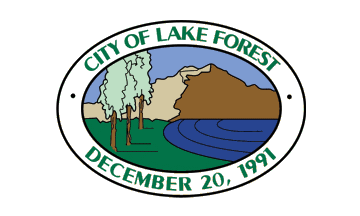
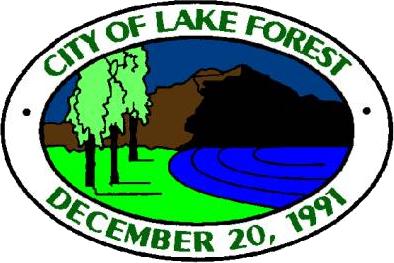
- Flag Seal
- Interactive map of Lake Forest, California
- Location in the United States
- Coordinates: 33°38′30″N 117°41′27″W
- Country: United States
- State: California
- County: Orange
- Incorporated: December 20, 1991

Government
  - Type: Council–manager
  - Mayor: Scott Voigts
  - Mayor Pro Tem: Robert Pequeno
  - City Council: Doug Cirbo; Benjamin Yu; Mark Tettemer
  - City Manager: Debra D. Rose
  - Assistant City Manager: Keith Neves

Area
  - Total: 16.79 sq mi (43.49 km^{2})
  - Land: 16.71 sq mi (43.29 km^{2})
  - Water: 0.077 sq mi (0.20 km^{2}) 0.47%
- Elevation: 486 ft (148 m)

Population (2020)
  - Total: 85,858
  - Rank: 94th in California
  - Density: 5,137/sq mi (1,983/km^{2})
- Time zone: UTC-8 (PST)
  - Summer (DST): UTC-7 (PDT)
- ZIP codes: 92609, 92610, 92630, 92679
- Area code: 949
- FIPS code: 06-39496
- GNIS feature IDs: 1656503, 2411602
- Website: lakeforestca.gov

Lake Forest is a city in Orange County, California, United States. The population was 85,858 at the 2020 census.

Lake Forest incorporated as a city on December 20, 1991. Before incorporation, the community had been known as El Toro (in Spanish, "the bull"). In 2000, Lake Forest voted to expand its city limits to include the master-planned developments of Foothill Ranch and Portola Hills. This expansion brought new homes and commercial centers to the city's northeastern boundary.

Lake Forest has two lakes from which the city gets its name. The lakes are man-made, and condominiums and custom homes ranging from large to small line their shores. Neighborhood associations manage the lakes (Lake 1, known as the Lake Forest Beach and Tennis Club, and Lake 2, the Sun and Sail Club.) Each facility features tennis courts, gyms, basketball courts, barbecue pits, volleyball courts, multiple swimming pools, saunas, hot tubs and club houses for social events.

The "forest" for which the city is also named lies in the area between Ridge Route, Jeronimo, Lake Forest and Serrano roads, and consists mostly of eucalyptus trees. It is also man-made, and was created in the first decade of the 1900s when a local landowner, Dwight Whiting, planted 400 acres (1.6 km^{2}) of eucalyptus groves in the vicinity of Serrano Creek as part of a lumber operation intended to draw development to the area. In the late 1960s, the Occidental Petroleum company developed a residential community in and around the eucalyptus groves, which had long since expanded and grown much denser.

== History ==
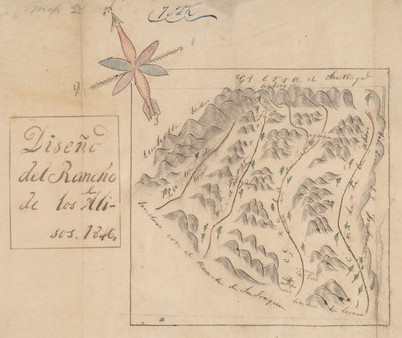
Lake Forest's origins lie in Rancho Cañada de los Alisos, granted in 1842 to José Antonio Serrano. By 1863, the community that grew up in Serrano's rancho came to be known as El Toro.

From 1863, the community had been known as El Toro. In 1847 José Serrano and his family occupied 11,000 acres of the Rancho Cañada de los Alisos that had been granted to them by the Government of Mexico, and that eventually reached the hands of Dwight Whiting. Whiting was instrumental in bringing the Santa Fe rail line through the region. The Rancho Niguel was granted to Juan B. Alvarado, Juan Avila and his sister Conception, the widow of one Pedro Sánchez. From them it passed to other owners and was divided into plots, including Yorba. In 1874, most of it was owned by Cyrus B. Rawson. Jonathan E. Bacon also owned 1,600 acres. In addition to the Serranos, established in Aliso Canyon, there was a group of pioneers who lived in the foothills and several miles above El Toro, many of whom were among the first settlers of this neighborhood.

El Toro Road at the Interstate 5 freeway was the epicenter of the Saddleback Valley from the late 19th century to around 2000. However, the area gradually deteriorated, and most of the shops closed or moved to other cities. After years of planning, the city has worked with the property owners of some aging strip malls and developed the "Arbor at Lake Forest" commercial district. The new center now competes with large shopping centers in cities that surround Lake Forest.

In 1991, residents chose to incorporate, and chose the name "Lake Forest" in a referendum. Controversy ensued for months, as residents of the newer subdivisions argued that "Lake Forest" sounded better than "El Toro", while long-time residents complained that the name change aimed to erase the town's history in favor of an artificial name that referred to man-made lakes. El Toro High School kept its name and continues to do so to this day. In subsequent years as the city came to be referred to as Lake Forest, mentions of "El Toro" in the press usually referred to the Marine Corps Air Station El Toro, decommissioned in 1999 and later repurposed.

== Geography ==
According to the United States Census Bureau, the city has an area of 16.8 square miles (44 km^{2}), of which 16.7 square miles (43 km^{2}) is land and 0.08 square miles (0.21 km^{2}) (0.47%) is water.

Lake Forest is bordered by Irvine on the west and northwest, Laguna Hills and Laguna Woods on the southwest, Mission Viejo on the southeast, Trabuco Canyon and Silverado Canyon on the east, and Limestone Canyon Regional Park on the north.

Lake Forest is in the heart of the Saddleback Valley, with the northeastern end in the foothills of the Santa Ana Mountains. It is also in the northern section of South Orange County.

It has two man-made lakes identified by the clubhouses on the lakes—the Beach and Tennis Club (Hidden Lakes, formerly Lake I) and the Sun and Sail Club (Lake II).

== Infrastructure ==
=== Transportation ===
==== Highways ====
Interstate 5 travels along the western border of Lake Forest, forming the border with Laguna Hills. I-5 has two interchanges in the city: Lake Forest Drive and El Toro Road (Highway S18).

California State Route 241 passes through the Foothill Ranch community of Lake Forest, in close proximity to several residential and commercial areas. SR 241 has three interchanges in Lake Forest: Alton Parkway, Lake Forest Drive (a partial interchange with a southbound exit and northbound entrance only), and Portola Parkway.

County Route S18, also known as El Toro Road, travels the entire length and width of the city, about 10.5 miles. The road passes through numerous communities, such as Portola Hills. At Live Oak Canyon Road, El Toro becomes Santiago Canyon Road, forming the far northeast boundary of Lake Forest, before heading through the Santa Ana Mountains and becoming Chapman Avenue in northern Orange County.

== Demographics ==
Historical population
| Census | Pop. | Note | %± |
|---|---|---|---|
| 1970 | 8,654 | | — |
| 1980 | 38,153 | | 340.9% |
| 1990 | 62,685 | | 64.3% |
| 2000 | 58,707 | | −6.3% |
| 2010 | 77,264 | | 31.6% |
| 2020 | 85,858 | | 11.1% |
U.S. Decennial Census; 1850–1870 1880-1890; 1900 1910 1920; 1930 1940 1950; 1960 1970 1980; 1990 2000 2010

Most of the community was listed as an unincorporated area under the name El Toro in the 1970 U.S. census; and designated a census designated place in the 1980 United States census. Before the 2000 U.S. census most of the area of the CDP was used to form the city of Lake Forest with a small portion annexed to Mission Viejo.

=== Racial and ethnic composition ===
Lake Forest city, California – Racial and ethnic composition Note: the US Census treats Hispanic/Latino as an ethnic category. This table excludes Latinos from the racial categories and assigns them to a separate category. Hispanics/Latinos may be of any race.
| Race / Ethnicity (NH = Non-Hispanic) | Pop 1980 | Pop 1990 | Pop 2000 | Pop 2010 | Pop 2020 | % 1980 | % 1990 | % 2000 | % 2010 | % 2020 |
|---|---|---|---|---|---|---|---|---|---|---|
| White alone (NH) | 33,575 | 49,309 | 39,161 | 44,177 | 40,506 | 88.00% | 78.66% | 66.71% | 57.18% | 47.18% |
| Black or African American alone (NH) | 350 | 1,051 | 998 | 1,158 | 1,312 | 0.92% | 1.68% | 1.70% | 1.50% | 1.53% |
| Native American or Alaska Native alone (NH) | 158 | 211 | 143 | 195 | 153 | 0.41% | 0.34% | 0.24% | 0.25% | 0.18% |
| Asian alone (NH) | 1,560 | 5,598 | 5,647 | 9,985 | 16,650 | 4.09% | 8.93% | 9.62% | 12.92% | 19.39% |
| Native Hawaiian or Pacific Islander alone (NH) | 1,560 | 5,598 | 113 | 172 | 144 | 4.09% | 8.93% | 0.19% | 0.22% | 0.17% |
| Other race alone (NH) | 20 | 52 | 102 | 166 | 450 | 0.05% | 0.08% | 0.17% | 0.21% | 0.52% |
| Mixed race or Multiracial (NH) | x | x | 1,630 | 2,387 | 4,698 | x | x | 2.78% | 3.09% | 5.47% |
| Hispanic or Latino (any race) | 2,490 | 6,464 | 10,913 | 19,024 | 21,945 | 6.53% | 10.31% | 18.59% | 24.62% | 25.56% |
| Total | 38,153 | 62,685 | 58,707 | 77,264 | 85,858 | 100.00% | 100.00% | 100.00% | 100.00% | 100.00% |

=== 2020 census ===
As of the 2020 census, Lake Forest had a population of 85,858. The population density was 5,136.9 inhabitants per square mile (1,983.4/km^{2}).

The census reported that 99.5% of the population lived in households, 0.3% lived in non-institutionalized group quarters, and 0.2% were institutionalized. The census also reported that 100.0% of residents lived in urban areas, while 0.0% lived in rural areas.

There were 29,728 households, out of which 34.9% included children under the age of 18, 59.2% were married-couple households, 5.6% were cohabiting couple households, 21.3% had a female householder with no partner present, and 13.9% had a male householder with no partner present. 17.9% of households were one person, and 7.2% were one person aged 65 or older. The average household size was 2.87. There were 22,421 families (75.4% of all households).

The age distribution was 21.3% under the age of 18, 8.3% aged 18 to 24, 27.8% aged 25 to 44, 28.1% aged 45 to 64, and 14.5% who were 65 years of age or older. The median age was 39.5 years. For every 100 females, there were 97.1 males, and for every 100 females age 18 and over there were 95.0 males age 18 and over.

There were 30,570 housing units at an average density of 1,829.0 units per square mile (706.2 units/km^{2}), of which 29,728 (97.2%) were occupied. Of the occupied units, 68.7% were owner-occupied and 31.3% were occupied by renters. Of all housing units, 2.8% were vacant. The homeowner vacancy rate was 0.9% and the rental vacancy rate was 3.5%.

=== 2023 ACS estimates ===
In 2023, the US Census Bureau estimated that the median household income was $131,378, and the per capita income was $58,506. About 5.7% of families and 8.3% of the population were below the poverty line.

=== 2010 census ===
The 2010 United States census reported that Lake Forest had a population of 77,264. The population density was 4,315.9 inhabitants per square mile (1,666.4/km^{2}). The racial makeup of Lake Forest was 54,341 (70.3%) White, 1,295 (1.7%) African American, 384 (0.5%) Native American, 10,115 (13.1%) Asian, 191 (0.2%) Pacific Islander, 7,267 (9.4%) from other races, and 3,671 (4.8%) from two or more races. Hispanic or Latino of any race were 19,024 persons (24.6%).

The Census reported that 76,749 people (99.3% of the population) lived in households, 299 (0.4%) lived in non-institutionalized group quarters, and 216 (0.3%) were institutionalized.

There were 26,224 households, out of which 10,407 (39.7%) had children under the age of 18 living in them, 15,603 (59.5%) were married couples, 2,710 (10.3%) had a female householder with no husband present, 1,299 (5.0%) had a male householder with no wife present. There were 1,217 (4.6%) unmarried partnerships, and 201 (0.8%) same-sex couples. 4,883 households (18.6%) were made up of individuals, and 1,432 (5.5%) had someone living alone who was 65 years of age or older. The average household size was 2.93. There were 19,612 families (74.8% of all households); the average family size was 3.30.

The population was spread out, with 19,115 people (24.7%) under the age of 18, 6,775 people (8.8%) aged 18 to 24, 22,099 people (28.6%) aged 25 to 44, 22,184 people (28.7%) aged 45 to 64, and 7,091 people (9.2%) who were 65 years of age or older. The median age was 37.2 years. For every 100 females, there were 98.7 males. For every 100 females age 18 and over, there were 96.5 males.

There were 27,088 housing units at an average density of 1,513.1 units per square mile (584.2 units/km^{2}), of which 18,579 (70.8%) were owner-occupied, and 7,645 (29.2%) were occupied by renters. The homeowner vacancy rate was 1.3%; the rental vacancy rate was 4.3%. 54,082 people (70.0% of the population) lived in owner-occupied housing units and 22,667 people (29.3%) lived in rental housing units.

== Economy ==
The city is home to the headquarters of eyewear manufacturer Oakley, Inc.; in-flight entertainment provider Panasonic Avionics; Karem Aircraft an aircraft company developing UAVs; telecommunications software developer Greenlight Wireless Corp.; barbecue retailer Barbeques Galore; restaurant chains Johnny Rockets and Del Taco; medical equipment maker Apria Healthcare; reverse mortgage lender Access Home Lending; and skateboarding companies Sole Technology, Inc., Etnies, Autism Behavior Services Inc., and Tilly's.

=== Top employers ===
According to the city's 2020 Comprehensive Annual Financial Report, its top employers are:

| # | Employer | # of employees |
|---|---|---|
| 1 | Panasonic Avionics Corporation | 2,290 |
| 2 | LoanDepot | 2,049 |
| 3 | Oakley | 1,400 |
| 4 | Schneider Electric (Invensys) | 500 |
| 5 | Spectrum Brands | 494 |
| 6 | Cox Communications | 491 |
| 7 | Bal Seal Engineering | 423 |
| 8 | The Home Depot | 348 |
| 9 | Walmart | 340 |
| 10 | Alcon Research | 315 |

== Arts and culture ==
Lake Forest is served by two branches of the Orange County Public Library system known as OC Public Libraries: the El Toro branch and the Foothill Ranch branch.

The city is the location of Rick Warren's megachurch, Saddleback Church, the sixth-largest evangelical church in the United States.

The city of Lake Forest puts on an annual summer concert at Pittsford Park. Other public events include the Fourth of July 5K run and fireworks display over the lake at the Sun & Sail Club. On Wednesdays at 4 pm, there is a farmers market at the Sports Park and Recreation Center, where locals can go and buy products from the local farmers and vendors.

In 2020, the classical music organization Chamber Music | OC moved its headquarters from Chapman University in Orange, California to the Lake Forest Business Center.

== Parks and recreation ==
Lake Forest Sports Park and Recreation Center opened on November 1, 2014, across the street from Saddleback Church. The 86.2-acre Sports Park, built with fees collected from developers for a "study" that led to the rezoning of surrounding areas, is one of Orange County's largest sports parks. The Recreation Center houses classrooms/activities rooms and a gymnasium, hosting many education and recreation programs that have previously been hosted at the rented City Hall facility.

Lake Forest is also home to two county parks. Whiting Ranch Wilderness Park in the eastern part of the city was the site of an infamous mountain lion mauling in 2004 that captured the attention of the West Coast news media.

Heritage Hill Historical Park and Museum is home to some of Orange County's oldest buildings, including the Jose Serrano Adobe, an adobe home and settlement built in 1863; El Toro's first school, the old El Toro School House; El Toro's first church, St. George's Episcopal Church; and the Harvey Bennett Ranch House, built in 1908, from which the Bennett Ranch development in Lake Forest derives its name. The Bennetts raised oranges for Sunkist, and owned the state-deeded water rights to Aliso Creek, which was very rare in California and instrumental to their success. It is also the location of "Ritchie's Park", per signs along the creek–a naturally set childhood playground along the stream where the Bennett children and grandchildren played. Frequently, the children found Indian artifacts along the banks, and met relatives of the Indians whose ancestors had lived there, including "Al" and "Cy", older Indians working for the Bennetts. The park is named for Richard Bennett Harvey, the grandchild whom Harvey and Frances Bennett raised, their seventh and last "child" who grew up on the ranch and lived there later in early marriage, working there until it was sold. The Bennetts' son Richard Beach Bennett was educated in Animal Husbandry at California Polytechnic State University, Pomona, and grew replacement trees for farmers before starting his own ranch in Balcom Canyon in Ventura County.

Lake Forest also has etnies Skatepark, the largest public skatepark with over 40,000 square feet (3,700 m^{2}).

== Government ==
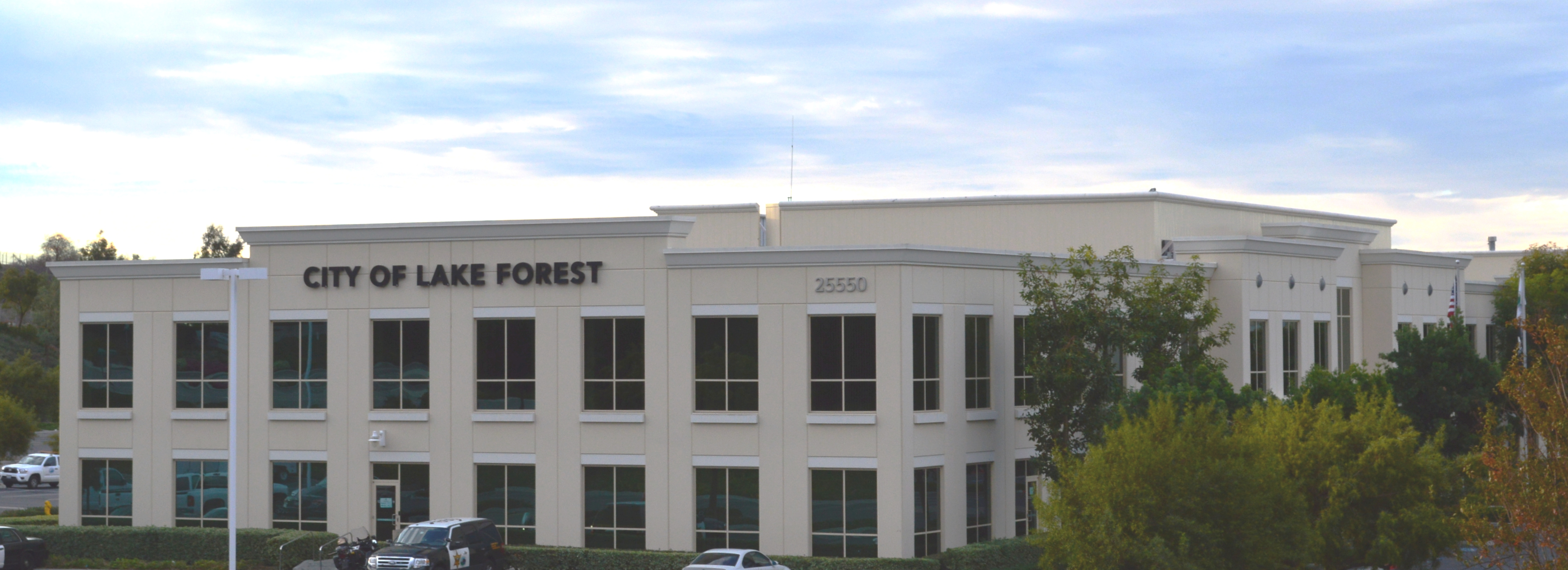
Former Lake Forest City Hall

Marine Corps Air Station El Toro was one mile (1.6 km) from Lake Forest, in Irvine. At one time, El Toro was considered a military town, but the city blossomed independently in the 1980s and 1990s before the base closed in 1999.

Doug Cirbo serves as Lake Forest's mayor and Mark Tettemer serves as mayor pro tempore. In addition to Cirbo and Tettemer, the City Council members are Robert Pequeno, Scott Voigts, and Benjamin Yu.

=== State and federal representation ===
Lake Forest city vote by party in presidential elections
| Year | Democratic | Republican | Third Parties |
|---|---|---|---|
| 2024 | 50.07% 21,519 | 46.44% 19,955 | 3.49% 1,500 |
| 2020 | 52.38% 23,810 | 45.40% 20,638 | 2.21% 1,006 |
| 2016 | 46.00% 16,221 | 46.76% 16,488 | 7.24% 2,553 |
| 2012 | 40.72% 13,307 | 56.57% 18,484 | 2.71% 885 |
| 2008 | 44.23% 14,937 | 53.40% 18,034 | 2.37% 802 |
| 2004 | 34.71% 11,200 | 64.11% 20,691 | 1.18% 381 |
| 2000 | 36.13% 10,968 | 60.56% 18,386 | 3.31% 1,005 |
| 1996 | 34.19% 7,511 | 54.94% 12,069 | 10.87% 2,389 |
| 1992 | 27.58% 6,908 | 45.76% 11,464 | 26.66% 6,680 |

In the California State Legislature, Lake Forest is in the 37th senatorial district, represented by Republican Steven Choi, and in the 72nd Assembly district, represented by Republican Diane Dixon.

In the United States House of Representatives, Lake Forest is in California's 40th congressional district, represented by Republican Young Kim.

According to the Secretary of State of California, as of February 10, 2019, Lake Forest has 46,014 registered voters. Of those, 17,329 (37.66%) are registered Republicans, 13,402 (29.13%) are registered Democrats, and 13,080 (28.43%) have no political party preference/are independents.

Historically, Lake Forest has, like most of southern Orange County, been a Republican fortress in presidential elections. Changing demographics and the intensely polarizing urban/rural divide, however, has made Lake Forest more fertile footing for Democrats, who in recent elections have been trimming the GOP margins in the city. In 2020, Joe Biden became the first Democratic presidential nominee to win Lake Forest since its incorporation.

== Education ==
Lake Forest has one high school, El Toro High School, which opened in 1973, and one high school on the border of Lake Forest and Mission Viejo, Trabuco Hills High School. The city also has eight elementary schools and a middle school. The mascot is a bull and its teams are known as the Chargers; its school colors are blue and gold. Lake Forest is served entirely by the Saddleback Valley Unified School District, or SVUSD.

== Notable people ==
- Nolan Arenado, MLB All-Star, St. Louis Cardinals
- Creighton Braun, soccer player
- Michael Bryant, soccer player
- Brad Bufanda, actor
- Lauren Chamberlain, professional softball player for USSSA Pride, holds record for most career home runs in NCAA
- Matt Chapman (baseball), MLB third baseman, San Francisco Giants
- Paul Skenes, MLB pitcher
- Jake Ellenberger, UFC fighter in welterweight division
- Ekaterina Gordeeva, 1988 and 1994 Olympic gold medalist in pair skating (married to Ilia Kulik)
- HORSE the Band, hardcore music act
- Ilia Kulik, 1998 Olympic gold medalist in men's single skating (married to Ekaterina Gordeeva)
- Ryan Lasch, ice hockey player
- Mark Muñoz, UFC fighter in middleweight division
- Eddie Paskey, "Lieutenant Leslie" from Star Trek: The Original Series
- Brandi Passante, TV personality
- Ginger Reyes, rock bassist with the bands The Smashing Pumpkins and Halo Friendlies
- Austin Romine, catcher for El Toro High School's baseball team, drafted by New York Yankees in 2007
- Kaitlin Sandeno, Olympic swimming champion, El Toro High School grad
- Lindsay Soto, football broadcaster
- Christine Woods, actress in ABC television show FlashForward
- Elaine Youngs, Olympic volleyball champion
- Sydney "SYNJ" Jarvis, singer and TV personality

=== Former ===
- Florence Griffith Joyner – athlete, Olympic gold medalist, laid to rest at El Toro Memorial Park.
- Diane Murphy - actress on Bewitched - El Toro High School graduate.
- Erin Murphy - actress on Bewitched - El Toro High School graduate.
- Nicole Brown Simpson - deceased former wife of O. J. Simpson, laid to rest at Ascension Cemetery.
- Jonathan Thulin - contemporary Christian singer and recording artist.
