= Trabuco Hills High School =

Location
- 27501 Mustang Run; Mission Viejo, California 92691; United States; 33°39′18″N 117°39′07″W

Information
- School type: Public, Comprehensive High School
- Founded: 1985
- School district: Saddleback Valley Unified School District
- Principal: Alicia Foulk
- Teaching staff: 107.48 (FTE)
- Grades: 9–12
- Enrollment: 2,475 (2024-2025)
- Student to teacher ratio: 23.03
- Campus: Suburban
- Colors: Navy Blue & Gray
- Athletics conference: CIF Southern Section; Coast View Athletic Association
- Mascot: Monty and Millie the Mustangs
- Nickname: Mustangs
- Accreditation: Blue Ribbon 2002
- Communities served: Rancho Santa Margarita, Lake Forest, Mission Viejo, Foothill Ranch, Trabuco Canyon, and Portola Hills
- Feeder schools: Rancho Santa Margarita Intermediate School; Los Alisos Intermediate School; Serrano Intermediate School
- Website: www.svusd.org/schools/high-schools/trabuco-hills

Trabuco Hills High School is a high school in Mission Viejo, California, United States. It is in the Saddleback Valley Unified School District.

== Demographics ==
14.0% of the students were eligible for free or reduced-cost lunch.

== Extracurricular programs ==
=== Instrumental music ===
During their 2010 and 2013 season, the drumline placed first in the Percussion Scholastic A Class at the Southern California Percussion Alliance (SCPA) Championships.

== Athletics ==
=== Cross Country ===
==== Boys ====
The boys' cross country program competes in the South Coast league. In 2006 and 2011, they finished first in the Division 1 California State Championship.

== Notable alumni ==
- Patrick Barnes (1993) - NFL quarterback
- Jake Breeland (2016) - NFL player
- Jonathon Blum (2007) - National Hockey League player, 2018 Winter Olympian
- Randy Josselyn (1992) - actor
- Josh Fuentes (2011) - Major League Baseball player, Colorado Rockies
- Jarah Mariano (2002) - supermodel
- Nick Punto (1996) - Major League Baseball player
- Andrew Romine (2004) - Major League Baseball player
- Josh Scherer (2010) - chef and internet personality
- Alec Sundly (2010) - soccer player and coach
- Josh Todd (1989) - lead singer of bands including Buckcherry
