= Kyle Molnar =

American baseball player (born 1996)

- Pitcher
- Born: November 14, 1996 (age 28); Upland, California, U.S.
- Bats: Right Throws: Right

Kyle Steven Molnar is an American former professional baseball pitcher.

== Amateur career ==
Molnar was born in Upland, California, to David and Kristin Molnar, and his hometown is Aliso Viejo, California. He attended and graduated from Aliso Niguel High School. As a freshman he was 5-3 with a 1.44 ERA, as a sophomore he was 8-3 record with a 2.25 ERA, as a junior he was 10-2 with a 1.81 ERA, and as a senior he was 7-4 with a 1.57 ERA; he threw a mid-90s fastball regularly. He also played the outfield. He was named 2013 and 2014 Perfect Game USA Underclass First Team All-American, Cal-Hi Sports All-State Second Team, and 2014 All-CIF Southern Section Division II First Team, to the 2014 Rawlings Top Prospect team at the Perfect Game USA National Showcase, and to the All-Tournament Team at the 17U Perfect Game USA World Series. He was also ranked No. 47 on Baseball America’s Top 50 Prospects for the 2015 MLB Draft, No. 23 on Baseball America’s 2015 Top 100 High School Prospects, a 2015 Perfect Game USA first team All-American, a 2015 Perfect Game USA California Region first team All-American, ranked No. 8 on Perfect Game USA’s 2015 list of Top 500 High School prospects in California, and competed for the gold-medal winning U.S. 18U National Team at the 18U COPABE Pan American Championship, where he threw back-to-back one-hitters against Panama and Mexico.

He then enrolled at the University of California, Los Angeles (UCLA), where he played college baseball for the UCLA Bruins, for whom he was 6-5 with a 3.27 ERA in 14 games (13 starts). In 2016 his 72 strikeouts were ninth in the Pac-12 and second among Pac-12 freshmen, and he was named a Louisville Slugger Freshman All-American and honorable mention All-Pac-12. Due to a torn elbow ligament that resulted in Tommy John surgery, he did not play in 2017, and pitched only one inning in 2018. He had a second elbow ligament reconstruction in May 2018.

== Professional career ==
The Los Angeles Angels selected him in the 26th round, with the 781st overall selection, of the 2019 Major League Baseball draft. Molnar did not play in a game in 2020 due to the cancellation of the minor league season because of the COVID-19 pandemic.

In 2021, Molnar made his professional debut, splitting time between the High-A Tri-City Dust Devils and Double-A Rocket City Trash Pandas. In 25 appearances between the two affiliates, Molnar struggled to a 2-3 record and 7.14 ERA with 43 strikeouts and 2 saves in 40.1 innings pitched. Hs split the 2022 season between Tri-City and the Single-A Inland Empire 66ers, posting a combined 5-0 record and 2.31 ERA with 47 strikeouts across 28 appearances. On August 25, 2022, Molnar was released by the Angels organization.

== International career ==
Molnar is Jewish, and was called up to the Israel national baseball team for the 2023 World Baseball Classic. He pitched in it against the Dominican Republic national baseball team.

== See also ==
- List of baseball players who underwent Tommy John surgery
