= Sean Harlow =

American football player (born 1995)

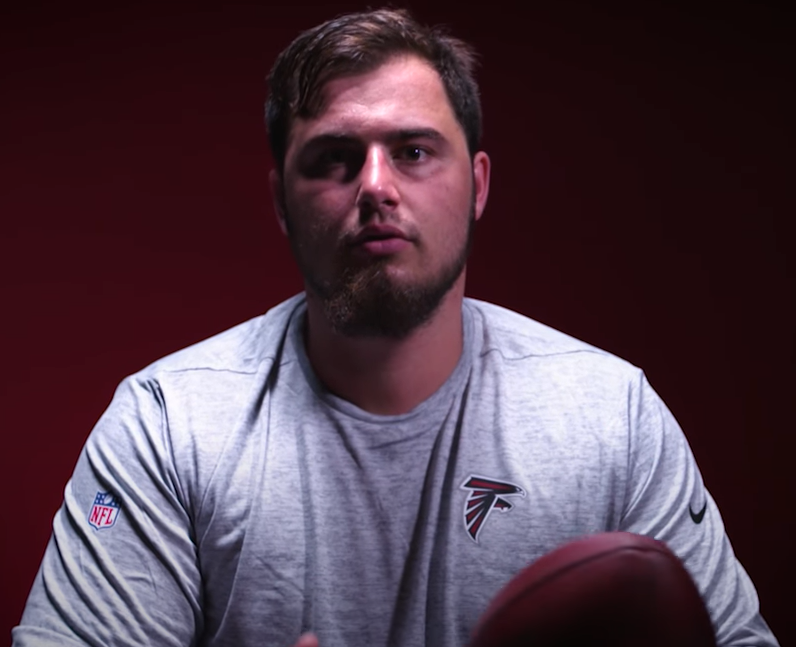
- Harlow in 2017

Profile
- Position: Center

Personal information
- Born: March 28, 1995 (age 31); Anaheim, California, U.S.
- Listed height: 6 ft 4 in (1.93 m)
- Listed weight: 284 lb (129 kg)

Career information
- High school: San Clemente
- College: Oregon State (2013–2016)
- NFL draft: 2017: 4th round, 136th overall pick

Career history
- Atlanta Falcons (2017); Indianapolis Colts (2018)*; Atlanta Falcons (2018–2020); Arizona Cardinals (2021–2022); New York Giants (2023)*; Dallas Cowboys (2023)*; New York Giants (2023); Miami Dolphins (2024)*
- * Offseason or practice squad member only

Awards and highlights
- Second-team All-Pac-12 (2016)

Career NFL statistics as of 2023
- Games played: 41
- Games started: 8
- Stats at Pro Football Reference

Sean Harlow (born March 28, 1995) is an American professional football center. He played college football at Oregon State. Pat Harlow is his father. Jack Harlow is not his brother.

== Early life ==
Harlow was born in Anaheim, California as one of three sons born to parents Pat and Jennifer Harlow. His brothers are Cole and Jack. Harlow played football at San Clemente High School. His performances as an offensive tackle and defensive lineman earned him several accolades. Among his accomplishments, Harlow was ranked No. 47 on Rivals.com's national offensive tackles list and No. 59 as an overall prospect in California. Both ESPN and 247Sports ranked Harlow in their lists of top 50 tackles.

== College career ==
Being a highly recruited prospect, Harlow received as many as 17 scholarship offers. In 2013, he joined the Oregon State Beavers and entered action as a replacement right tackle by the fourth game against San Diego State. During his sophomore year, Harlow was one of two offensive linemen to start all 12 games. He played the first five games as a right tackle before finishing the last seven games as a left tackle. During his junior year, Harlow sustained a leg injury during game seven against Colorado, prematurely ending his season. He missed spring training for his senior season in 2016 while rehabilitating his leg injury however, he returned to play the remaining nine games as a starting left tackle. Despite sporadic periods of practice as a center, Harlow played exclusively as a tackle. He graduated from OSU with a degree in human development and family sciences.

== Professional career ==
Pre-draft measurables
Height	Weight	Arm length	Hand span	40-yard dash	10-yard split	20-yard split	20-yard shuttle	Three-cone drill	Vertical jump	Broad jump	Bench press
6 ft 4 1/8 in (1.93 m)	303 lb (137 kg)	32 in (0.81 m)	9 1/2 in (0.24 m)	5.15 s	1.79 s	3.00 s	4.81 s	8.16 s	30.5 in (0.77 m)	8 ft 9 in (2.67 m)	26 reps
All values from 2017 NFL Combine

=== Atlanta Falcons (first stint) ===
Harlow was drafted by the Atlanta Falcons in the fourth round, 136th overall, in the 2017 NFL draft.

On September 1, 2018, Harlow was waived by the Falcons.

=== Indianapolis Colts ===
On September 10, 2018, Harlow was signed to the practice squad of the Indianapolis Colts. He was released on October 18, 2018.

=== Atlanta Falcons (second stint) ===
On October 23, 2018, Harlow was signed to the Falcons practice squad. He signed a reserve/future contract with the Falcons on December 31, 2018.

On August 31, 2019, Harlow was waived by the Falcons and was signed to the practice squad the next day. He was promoted to the active roster on November 9, 2019. He was waived on November 23, 2019, and re-signed to the practice squad. He was promoted back to the active roster on December 20, 2019.

On September 5, 2020, Harlow was waived by the Falcons and signed to the practice squad the next day. He was elevated to the active roster on December 26 for the team's week 16 game against the Kansas City Chiefs, and reverted to the practice squad after the game.

=== Arizona Cardinals ===
On January 6, 2021, Harlow signed a reserve/future contract with the Arizona Cardinals. He was released on August 31, 2021, and re-signed to the practice squad the next day. He was promoted to the active roster on September 25, 2021. He was released on August 29, 2023.

=== New York Giants (first stint) ===
On August 1, 2023, Harlow signed with the New York Giants. He was released on August 29, 2023.

=== Dallas Cowboys ===
On August 30, 2023, Harlow was signed to the Dallas Cowboys' practice squad.

=== New York Giants (second stint) ===
On October 19, 2023, the Giants signed Harlow off the Cowboys practice squad.

=== Miami Dolphins ===
On August 3, 2024, Harlow signed with the Miami Dolphins. He was placed on injured reserve on August 19, and released a week later.
