= Evan Fitterer =

Free agent
- Pitcher
- Born: June 26, 2000 (age 26); Mission Viejo, California, U.S.
- Bats: Right Throws: Right

Evan Otto Fitterer (born June 26, 2000) is an American professional baseball pitcher who is a free agent.

== Amateur career ==
Fitterer attended Aliso Niguel High School in Aliso Viejo, California. As a senior in 2019, he went 9–1 with a 0.97 ERA and 82 strikeouts over 65 innings alongside batting .375.

== Professional career ==
Fitterer was selected by the Miami Marlins in the fifth round of the 2019 Major League Baseball draft. He signed with the team, forgoing his commitment to play college baseball for the UCLA Bruins.

Fitterer made his professional debut with the Gulf Coast League Marlins, posting a 2.38 ERA and 19 strikeouts over 22 2/3 innings. He did not play a game in 2020 due to the cancellation of the minor league season caused by the COVID-19 pandemic. He pitched only 30 1/3 innings in 2021 due to injury between the Gulf Coast League Marlins and the Jupiter Hammerheads, but did pitch seven innings in the Arizona Fall League for the Mesa Solar Sox. Fitterer pitched for the Beloit Sky Carp in 2022, starting 22 games and going 4–7 with a 4.28 ERA and eighty strikeouts over 107 1/3 innings. He returned to Beloit to open the 2023 season and was promoted to the Pensacola Blue Wahoos in late April. Over 26 starts between the two teams, Fitterer went 9–8 with a 4.26 ERA and 118 strikeouts over 122 2/3 innings. Fitterer was assigned to Pensacola to open the 2024 season and went 6–6 with a 4.17 ERA and 85 strikeouts over 95 innings and 19 starts. He also briefly spent time with Jacksonville Jumbo Shrimp, posting a 7.71 ERA in six starts.

Fitterer was assigned back to Pensacola to open the 2025 season and was named Southern League Pitcher of the Month in April. He made 33 appearances (10 starts) for the Blue Wahoos, compiling a 7–6 record and 3.42 ERA with 94 strikeouts and one save across 94 2/3 innings pitched. Fitterer elected free agency following the season on November 6, 2025.

On December 8, 2025, Fitterer signed a minor league contract with the San Diego Padres. He was assigned to the El Paso Chihuahuas for the 2026 season and pitched in 28 games in which he had a 4–8 record, a 4.06 ERA, and 64 strikeouts over 95 1/3 innings. He elected free agency on November 2.
