= Rancho Cañada de los Alisos =

Coordinates: 33.640°N 117.690°W

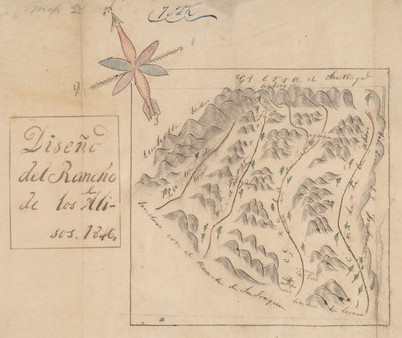
Rancho Cañada de los Alisos was granted in 1842 to José Antonio Serrano. By 1863, the community that grew up in Serrano's rancho came to be known as El Toro. Nearly 150 years later, in 1991, El Toro incorporated and changed its name to Lake Forest.

Rancho Cañada de los Alisos was a 10,668-acre (43.17 km^{2}) Mexican land grant in present-day Orange County, California given by Governor Juan Bautista Alvarado to Jose Antonio Fernando Serrano in 1842, and enlarged by a second grant by Pio Pico in 1846. The name means "Glen of the Alders" in Spanish, after the native White Alder (Alnus rhombifolia) trees growing there. The rancho included the present day cities of Lake Forest (formerly El Toro), and the Marine Corps Air Station El Toro—Orange County Great Park site in Irvine.

== History ==
Jose Antonio Fernando Serrano (1804-1870) was granted Rancho Cañada de Los Alisos in 1842. Serrano married Maria Petra Avila. Serrano and his sons raised crops to sell, however, their principal industry was cattle, from which hides and tallow were sold.

With the cession of California to the United States following the Mexican-American War, the 1848 Treaty of Guadalupe Hidalgo provided that the land grants would be honored. As required by the Land Act of 1851, a claim for Rancho Cañada de los Alisos was filed with the Public Land Commission in 1852, and the grant patented to Jose Antonio Fernando Serrano in 1871.

A series of droughts, beginning in 1863 and lasting intermittently through 1883, forced the Serrano family to divide the ranch and mortgage several sections. Unfortunately, the drought of 1863 and 1864 caused the death of Serrano's herds, forcing foreclosure of the ranch to Los Angeles banker J.S. Slauson. Slauson divided the ranch into ten parcels, the largest being 10,000 acres (40 km^{2}). Bostonian Dwight Whiting purchased most of the rancho in 1884. Whiting developed it as an English village named Aliso City. Whiting encouraged development by subdividing level land, bringing the railroad through, and by planting olive trees, grape vineyards and some 400 acres (1.6 km^{2}) of eucalyptus trees. However, due to the arid climate and poor soil, agricultural use was unsuccessful. In 1959, the remaining Whiting properties were sold to V.P. Baker and Associates, and residential development has since ensued. The Bakers sold to Deane Bros./Occidental Petroleum, who developed Lake Forest.

== Historic sites of the Rancho ==
- Jose Serrano Adobe. The Serrano Adobe was built by Jose Antonio Fernando Serrano in about 1863. It is the second of five adobes built by the Serranos on this Mexican land grant and the only one still remaining.
