= José Serrano Adobe =

Historic house in California, United States

- U.S. National Register of Historic Places
- California Historical Landmark
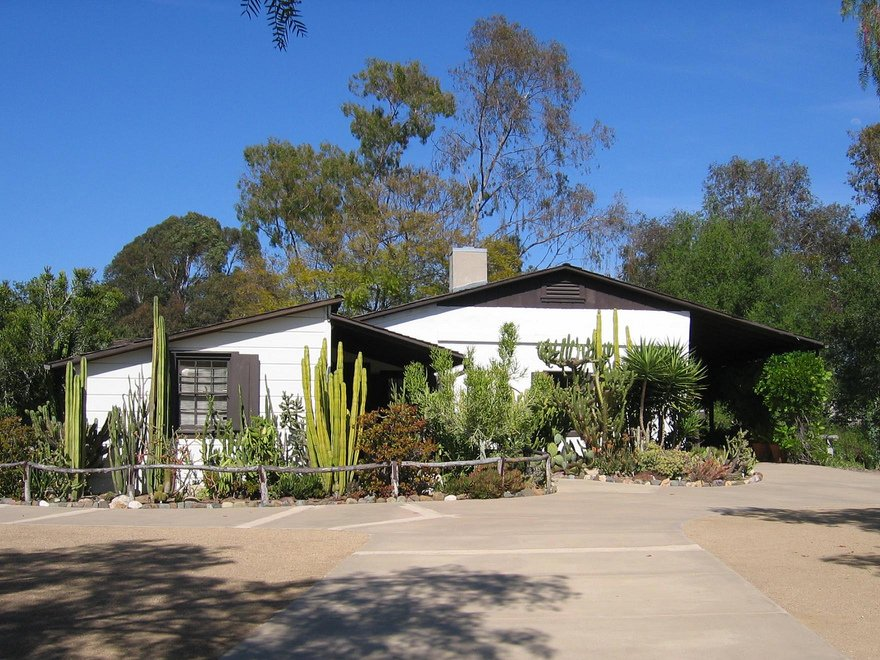

- Location within California Location within the United States
- Location: 25151 Serrano Road, Lake Forest, California
- Coordinates: 33°38′50″N 117°41′21″W
- Built: 1863
- NRHP reference No.: 76000505
- CHISL No.: 199
- Added to NRHP: May 24, 1976

The José Serrano Adobe is a historic 1863 adobe house in Lake Forest, Orange County, California. The property is one of four historic buildings at Heritage Hill Historic Park. It was listed on the National Register of Historic Places on May 24, 1976.

== History ==
The adobe was built by José Serrano in 1863, on the 10,688-acre (4,325 ha) Rancho Canada de los Alisos granted by Governor Juan B. Alvarado in 1842 and Governor Pio Pico in 1846. It is the second of five adobe structures built by the Serranos on the rancho. Serrano and his family lived in the adobe raising longhorn cattle until a series of droughts, beginning in 1863 and continuing intermittently through 1883, forced the family to divide the ranch and mortgage several sections.

Dwight Whiting, who played a major role in the development of El Toro (Lake Forest), purchased the Serrano Adobe and a significant area of the rancho in 1884. His son, George Whiting, made extensive additions to the dwelling in 1932, adding a dining room, bedroom, and kitchen. Shortly after George Whiting's restoration effort, the Serrano Adobe was nominated and accepted as California State Landmark #199. The extensive gardens include two pepper trees, both over a hundred years old.

The last private owner, V.P. Baker, used the home from 1958 to 1969, restoring and refurnishing the house as a vacation home and a meeting place for the Aliso Water Company. The Bakers sold the 5,000-acre (2,000 ha) Baker Ranch to Occidental Petroleum in 1969 for $11 million with the requirement that the new owners donate the Serrano Adobe to a public agency for preservation. In 1974, Deane Brothers, a development subsidiary of Occidental Petroleum, proceeded to donate 55.9 acres (22.6 ha) round the Serrano Adobe and Serrano Creek to the County of Orange.

== Heritage Hill Historical Park ==
Orange County set aside 4.1 acres (1.7 ha) surrounding the Serrano Adobe for the development of a historical park, now dedicated to interpreting the early history of the Saddleback Valley and El Toro area.

The Saddleback Area Historical Society formed in 1973 and supported the preservation of El Toro's first church, St. George's Episcopal Mission, and the first schoolhouse, the El Toro Grammar School, by moving these buildings to the Serrano Adobe site in 1976. The Harvey Bennett Ranch House, built in 1908, was moved to the site in 1978 with the cooperation of the developers of the Bennett Ranch subdivision, the William Lyon Company.

The José Serrano Adobe site opened as Orange County's first historical park under the name Heritage Hill Historical Park in May 1981. After the completion of the Bennett House restoration, the County rededicated the park in September 1985.

== Marker ==
- State of California Historic Landmark No. 199, La Casa de Adobe de Jose Serrano, Home of Jose Serrano, original grantee of Rancho Canada de los Alisos Restored A.D. 1932 (Marker Number 199.)

== See also ==
- National Register of Historic Places listings in Orange County, California
- California Historical Landmarks in Orange County, California
