= Dana Hills High School =

Coordinates: 33°28′40″N 117°42′02″W

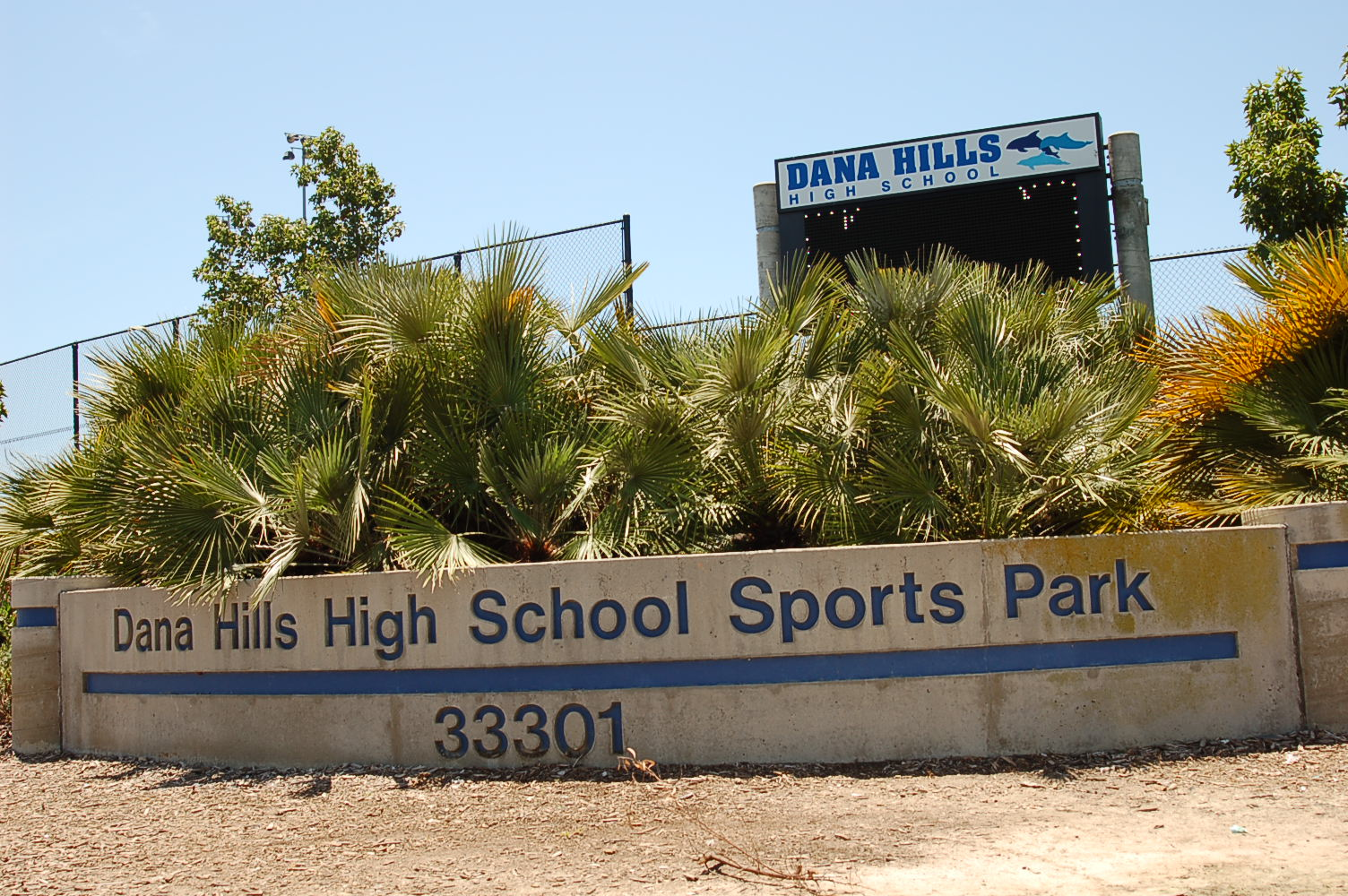

Location
- 33333 Golden Lantern; Dana Point, California 92629; United States

Information
- Type: Public School
- Established: 1972
- School district: Capistrano Unified School District
- Teaching staff: 79.99 (FTE)
- Grades: 9-12
- Enrollment: 1,725 (2024-2025)
- Student to teacher ratio: 21.57
- Colors: Blue & Silver
- Athletics conference: CIF Southern Section; Coast View Athletic Association
- Nickname: Dolphins
- Newspaper: Dolphin Dispatch
- Yearbook: The Mast
- Website: https://danahills.capousd.org/

Dana Hills High School is a high school in Dana Point, California opened in 1973. The school's enrollment of roughly 2,000 students is drawn from the nearby communities of Laguna Niguel, Dana Point, Capistrano Beach, and San Juan Capistrano.

When Dana Hills was built in 1972–73, the area was an unincorporated area of Orange County. The school was named for its hilltop location over the unincorporated village of Dana Point, as well as the tip of the hill projecting south into the Pacific Ocean as the Dana Point headland. The school later became a part of the City of Dana Point, when the city was incorporated in 1989.

Dana Hills now has over 236,758 square feet (21,995.5 m^{2}) in permanent buildings.

== History ==
By 2024, the school created a program to encourage students to avoid illegal usage of drugs. This was in response to several students' deaths via fentanyl.

In 2025, a new building was opened after several years of construction. The building holds sixteen classrooms, replacing the seventeen portable classrooms that were there prior to the construction.

Currently, plans are being made for more buildings to be constructed, eventually replacing all classrooms in the main building (the 'mall') and moving them. This is in order to change the main building into an athletics building.

== STAR Testing ==
Dana Hills' Academic Performance Index (API) for the year of 2007 was 824.

STAR testing was retired in 2013.

=== Recent scores ===
Year	API	Growth
2011	855	58
2010	848	8
2009	839	0
2008	899	9
2007	824	8
2006	816	5
2005	811	43
2004	768	18
2003	749	0

== HMO ==
Dana Hills has its own junior medical program, the Health and Medical Occupations Academy. The academy is for those who wish to study or pursue a career in medicine, as it prepares students for higher education in the medical field. Participants are involved in field trips, hospital duties, and even view medical procedures as they are performed.

== SOCSA ==
The South Orange County School of the Arts (SOCSA), a part of Dana Hills High School, is a visual and performing arts academy for students within the Capistrano Unified School District. Conceived in 1989 by a group of parents, teachers and administrators, the academy was chartered by the District on November 20, 1995. The pilot program at Dana Hills High School was launched in the Spring semester of 1996.

In October 2000, the SOCSA Foundation was formed to raise funds to support the SOCSA Academy. In the fall of 2015, the Friends of SOCSA was formed as a replacement non-profit to support the SOCSA Academy.

SOCSA website

== Marine Ecology Program ==
One of Dana Hills' science courses is the Marine Ecology program, which offers a full year of marine science covering both the physical and biological sciences of the ocean and how they work together to form a working Ecosystem. Examples of some of the subjects taught during the class include plate tectonics, waves and tides, ocean currents, sand, algae, plankton, marine mammals, echinoderms, and fish. One of the most well-known traditions of the class is the annual Baja field study. In this field study, students, parents, teachers, and past alumni of the class travel down to Baja, California for a week, usually in May. The purpose of this field study is to apply what the students have learned that year in the class and see it in its natural environment, outside of a conventional laboratory setting. The Baja field study is unique only to that of Dana Hills, and essentially offered nowhere else in the United States.

== Notable alumni ==
- Nicole Brown Simpson, former wife of ex-NFL player and actor O. J. Simpson
- Erik Apple, professional MMA fighter and from the movie Warrior (2011), formerly competing in Strikeforce (mixed martial arts)
- Dana Brown, filmmaker
- Melinda Clarke of The O.C.
- Jose Cortez, center for Greek Team Athens 2003–2009
- Scott Covington, NFL quarterback for the St. Louis Rams and Cincinnati Bengals
- Hans Crouse, Major League Baseball pitcher for the Philadelphia Phillies
- Anthony Cumia, one half of the former Opie and Anthony radio show and host of The Anthony Cumia Show on Compound Media.
- Charlotte Drury, national and international champion trampolinist, Olympic Alternate (Tokyo 2020)
- Jennifer Kessy (1994), professional volleyball player, silver medalist 2012 London Olympics
- Ian McCall, wrestler; professional mixed martial artist, retired UFC Flyweight contender
- Fredy Montero professional soccer player
- Kevin Page (1999) bassist of Something Corporate
- Brian Ireland (1998) drummer of Something Corporate
- Andrew McMahon (2000), lead singer of Something Corporate, Jack's Mannequin, and Andrew McMahon In the Wilderness
- Josiah Johnson, founding member and former vocalist, guitarist, percussionist of The Head and the Heart
- Seth Etherton, Major League Baseball pitcher for the Anaheim Angels and Cincinnati Reds
- Bao Quach, wrestler; professional MMA fighter
- Tanner Scheppers, MLB pitcher for Texas Rangers
- Justin South of Augustana
- Kyle Straka of The Growlers
- Mimi Walters, U.S. Congresswoman
- Luke Williams (2015), baseball player for the San Francisco Giants of Major League Baseball
- Pat O'Connell, professional surfer, star of The Endless Summer II
- Lloyd Bryan Molander Adams, Producer, Director, and Founder of the Dana Point Films Festival
- Marisa Pinson, American television writer, producer, actress and Podcaster. Writer and co-executive producer on Angie Trebeca. Co-creator and co-host of On Brand Podcast.
