= Aliso Niguel High School =

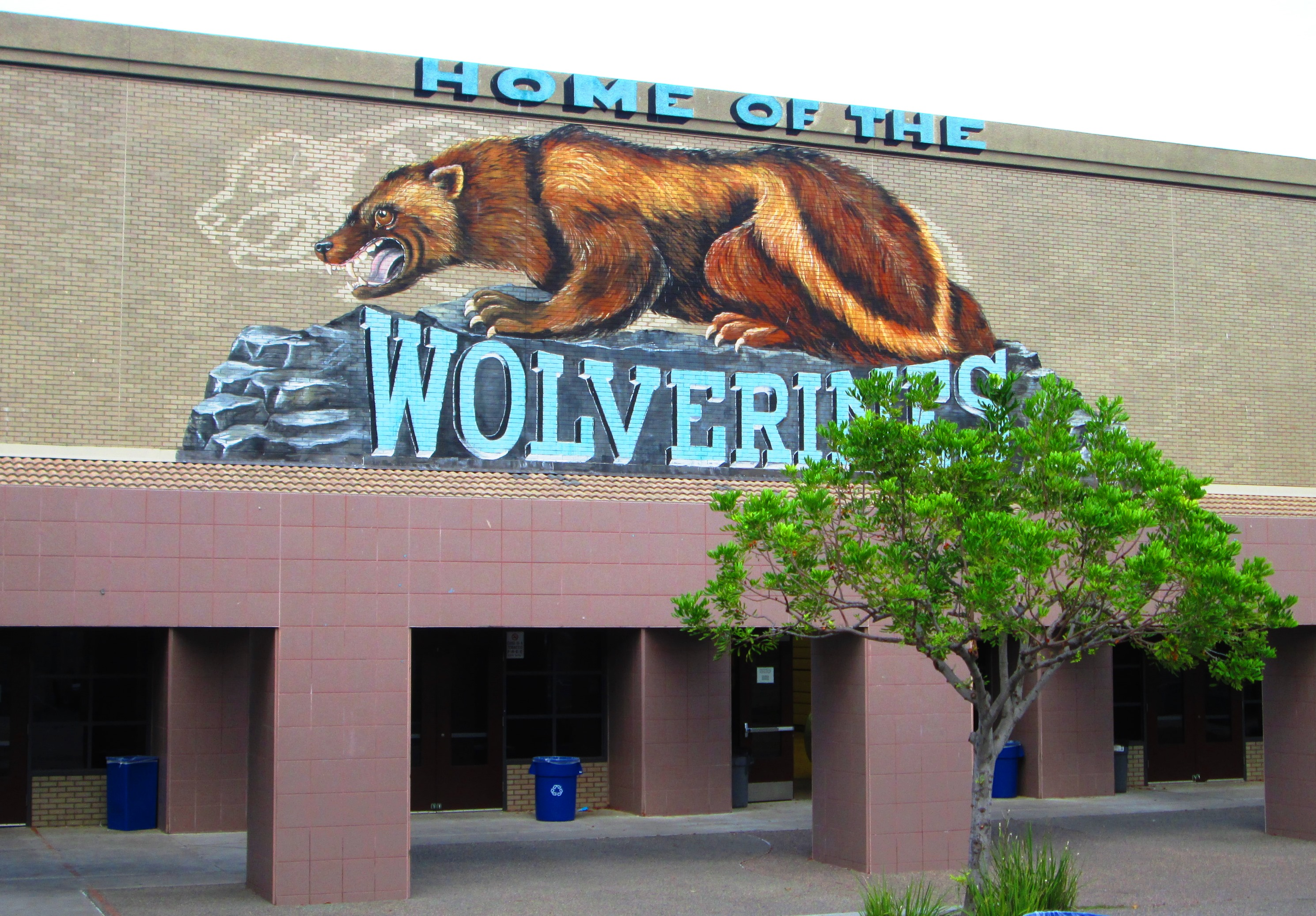

Location
- 28000 Wolverine Way; Aliso Viejo, California 92656; United States; 33°33′40″N 117°43′11″W

Information
- Type: Public high school
- Established: 1993
- School district: Capistrano Unified School District
- Principal: Dr. Manoj Mahindrakar
- Teaching staff: 117.11 (FTE)
- Grades: 9-12
- Enrollment: 2,608 (2023-2024)
- Student to teacher ratio: 22.27
- Campus: Suburban
- Colors: Teal, white, and black
- Athletics conference: CIF Southern Section; Coast View Athletic Association
- Mascot: Wolverine
- Newspaper: The Growling Wolverine
- Yearbook: The Legend
- Website: https://alisoniguel.capousd.org/

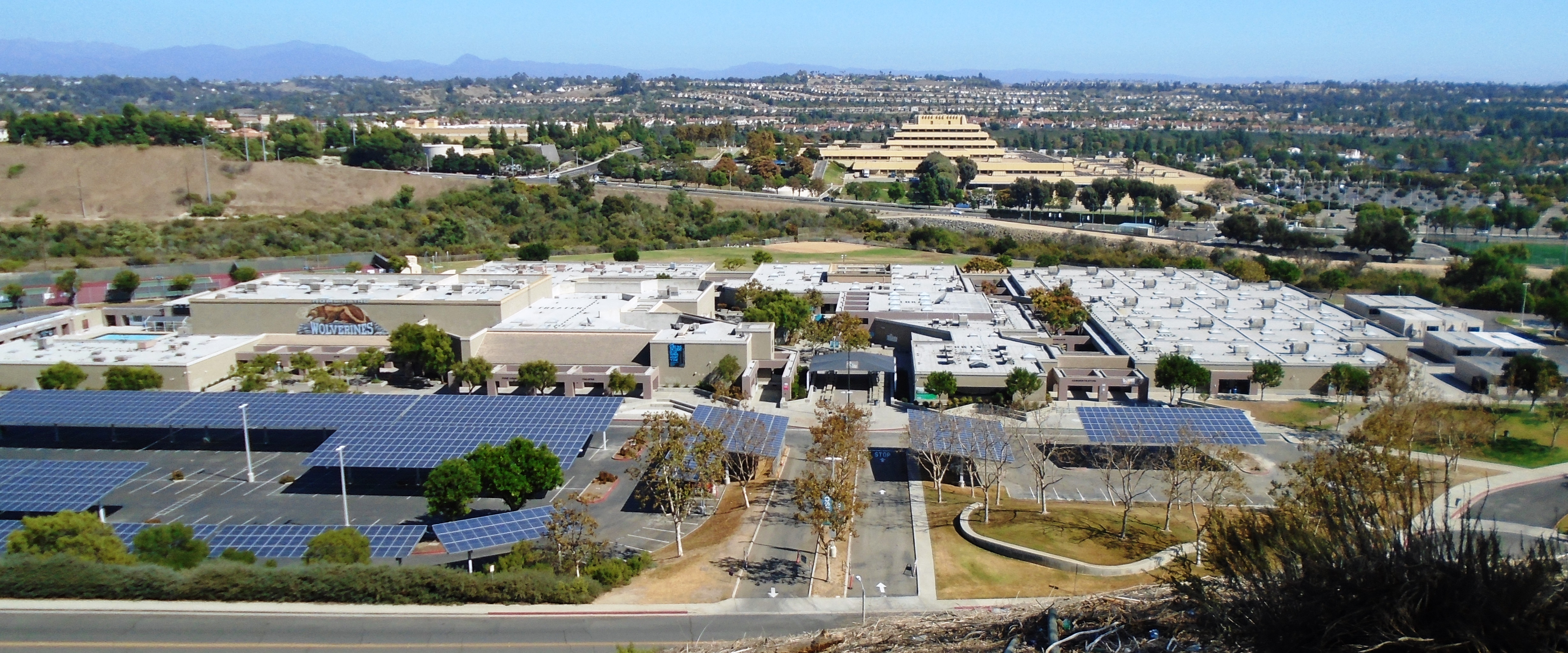
Aliso Niguel High School and Chet Holifield Federal Building from Hillview Park

Aliso Niguel High School (ANHS), which is part of the Capistrano Unified School District, is located in the city of Aliso Viejo, California. Most of its students reside in the communities of Aliso Viejo and Laguna Niguel. The school is a California Distinguished School, a National Blue Ribbon School, and a New American High School.

== History ==
Opening its doors in 1993 with a student body of 1600, ANHS became the fourth high school in the Capistrano Unified School District.

In 1996, Aliso Niguel was selected as a California Distinguished School, the youngest school ever to be recognized as such by the State Department of Education. In 2000, Aliso Niguel High School received national recognition as a Blue Ribbon School and New American High School. In 2004, The Western Association of Schools and Colleges granted Aliso Niguel a six-year term of accreditation, which it renewed for an additional six-year period in 2010, and again in 2016.

== Facilities ==
Although the high school started small (with about 1,400 students) in their first year, the high school grew rapidly over the years, and it still continues to grow to this present day. Currently, the school has 26 portable classrooms in its southern parking lot adding to 22,080 square feet (2,051 m^{2}), and 100 permanent classrooms. The permanent buildings are 200,000 square feet (19,000 m^{2}) forming a grand total of 222,080 square feet (20,632 m^{2}) on the campus, making Aliso the largest school in the district. The campus also includes a stadium, Wolverine Stadium, with a track and multipurpose field. Wolverine Stadium, which opened in 1994, seats 2,675 people, it includes a visitor side and a larger home side for seating.

== Sports ==
Aliso Niguel's sports teams are known as the Wolverines and compete in the Sea View League and South Coast League of the California Interscholastic Federation's Southern Section. From 1998 to 2005, they were members of the Sea View League, and in the Pacific Coast League before 1998.

- In 1996, the Aliso Niguel Varsity Football team went undefeated and won the CIF-SS Division VIII championship.
- In 2005, The Aliso Niguel Boys Basketball team won the CIF-Southern Section Division I-A championship.
- In 2012, the Aliso Niguel Girls Soccer team won the CIF Southern Section Division 1 championship. They were also named National Champions by ESPN and MaxPreps.
- In 2014, the Aliso Niguel Girls Volleyball team won the CIF Southern Section championship.

== Notable Alumni ==
Name	Year	Description
Sasha Cohen	2002	Olympic silver medalist figure skate (did not graduate)
Madelyn Desiano	2017	Soccer player
Josh Partington	1999	Lead guitarist for Something Corporate
Kathryn Plummer	2016	Olympic silver medalist and volleyball player for NCAA Champion Stanford Cardinal women's volleyball in 2016, 2018, 2019, current pro player for Eczacıbaşı Dynavit
Sammy Jo Prudhomme	2012	Professional soccer player
Grant Ginder	2001	Author of The People We Hate at the Wedding
Michelle Giuda	2003	Businesswoman
Michael Roll	2005	Professional basketball player
Robb MacLean	1997	Guitar and lead vocals for Limbeck
Patrick Carrie	1997	Guitar and backing vocals for Limbeck
Kyla Ross	2015	Olympic gold medalist gymnast
Marco Morante	1998	Co-owner of fashion brand Marco Marco and contestant on Netflix's Next in Fashion
Blake Sabol	2016	MLB player for the San Francisco Giants
Skip Schumaker	1998	MLB outfielder and second baseman and manager of the Miami Marlins and the Texas Rangers
Drew Westling	2005	Football player
Jon Wayne Freeman	1998	Spokesperson for Bug-A-Salt and surfing comedian
Zaneta Wyne	2008	Professional soccer player
Julian Jones	1999	Assistant and "Babysitter to the Stars" for the Maloof Family
Nicky Youre	2017	Singer and songwriter
Adam Foroughi	1998	Co-founder and CEO of AppLovin
Eric Wagaman	2015	MLB player for the Miami Marlins
Joe Turpel	1999	Commentator for the World Surf League known as "the voice of surfing"
Rachel Wood	2007	Professional soccer player
Charlie Wehan	2017	Professional soccer player
Kyle Molnar	2015	Professional baseball player
Quinn Mathews	2019	MLB pitcher for the St. Louis Cardinals
Evan Fitterer	2019	Professional baseball player
Cooper Flemming	2025	Professional baseball player
Tasha Ames	1996	Actress in Apple & Onion and Little Fires Everywhere

== Notable staff ==
- Drew Westling
