= Portola Hills, California =

- District of Lake Forest
- Location of Portola Hills within Orange County, California.
- Coordinates: 33°41′01″N 117°37′58″W
- Country: United States
- State: California
- County: Orange
- City: Lake Forest

Area
  - Total: 1.3 sq mi (3.4 km^{2})
  - Land: 1.3 sq mi (3.4 km^{2})
  - Water: 0.0 sq mi (0 km^{2})

Population (2000)
  - Total: 6,391
  - Density: 5,063.6/sq mi (1,955.1/km^{2})
- Time zone: UTC-8 (PST)
  - Summer (DST): UTC-7 (PDT)

Portola Hills is a district in the city of Lake Forest, California in Orange County, United States. It was an unincorporated community and census-designated place before it was fully annexed into Lake Forest. The population was 6,391 at the 2000 census. Portola Hills lies near Whiting Ranch Wilderness Park and Cleveland National Forest. Foothill Ranch is to the west, Rancho Santa Margarita in the southeast, Mission Viejo in the south, and the unincorporated regions of Silverado and Santiago Canyon to the north and northeast.

== History ==
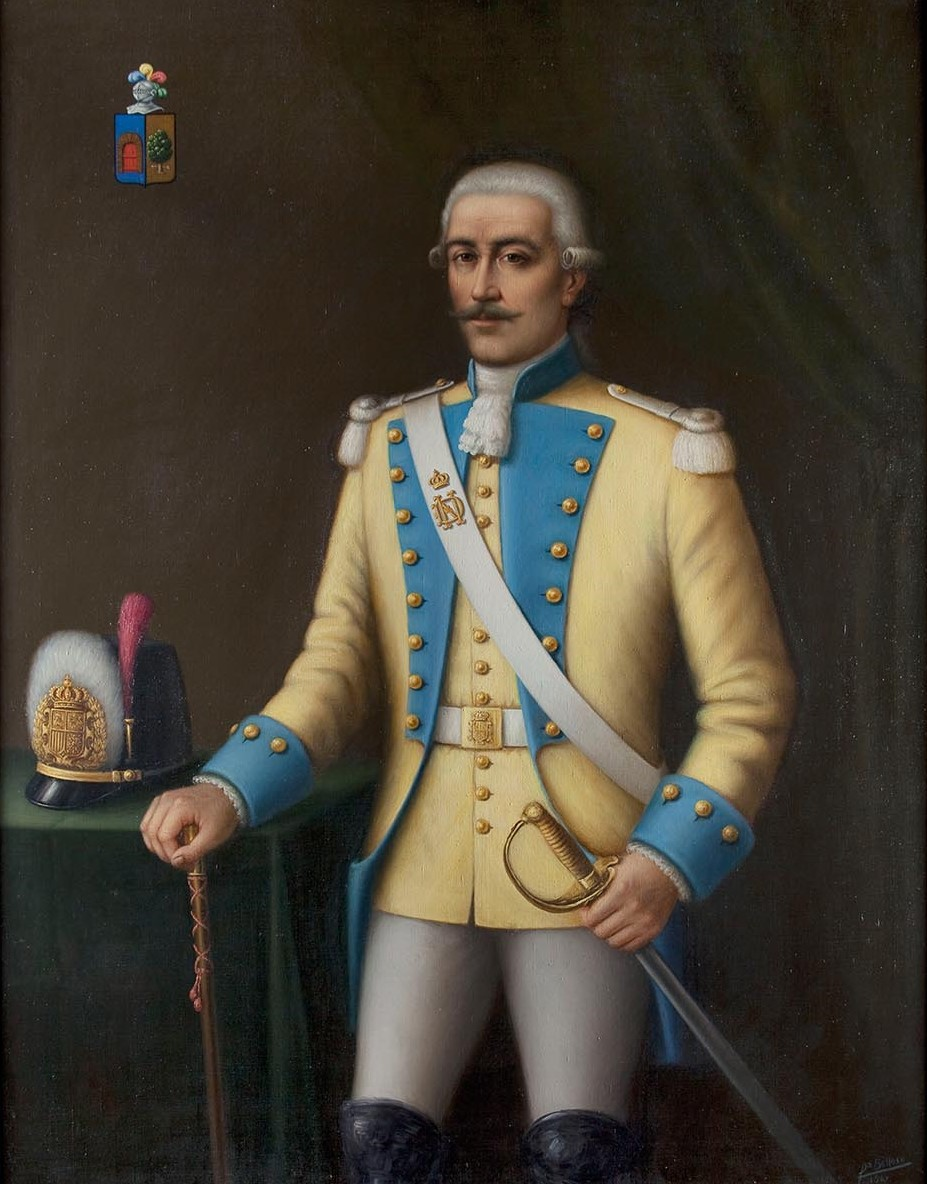
Portola Hills is named after Gaspar de Portolá, first Governor of the Californias.

The tracts were developed in the late 1980s through the early 1990s. The development was named after Gaspar de Portolá, California's first terrestrial Spanish explorer, who passed through the vicinity in 1769. (Nearby Trabuco Canyon is named for a blunderbuss which was lost by expedition members.)

== Geography ==
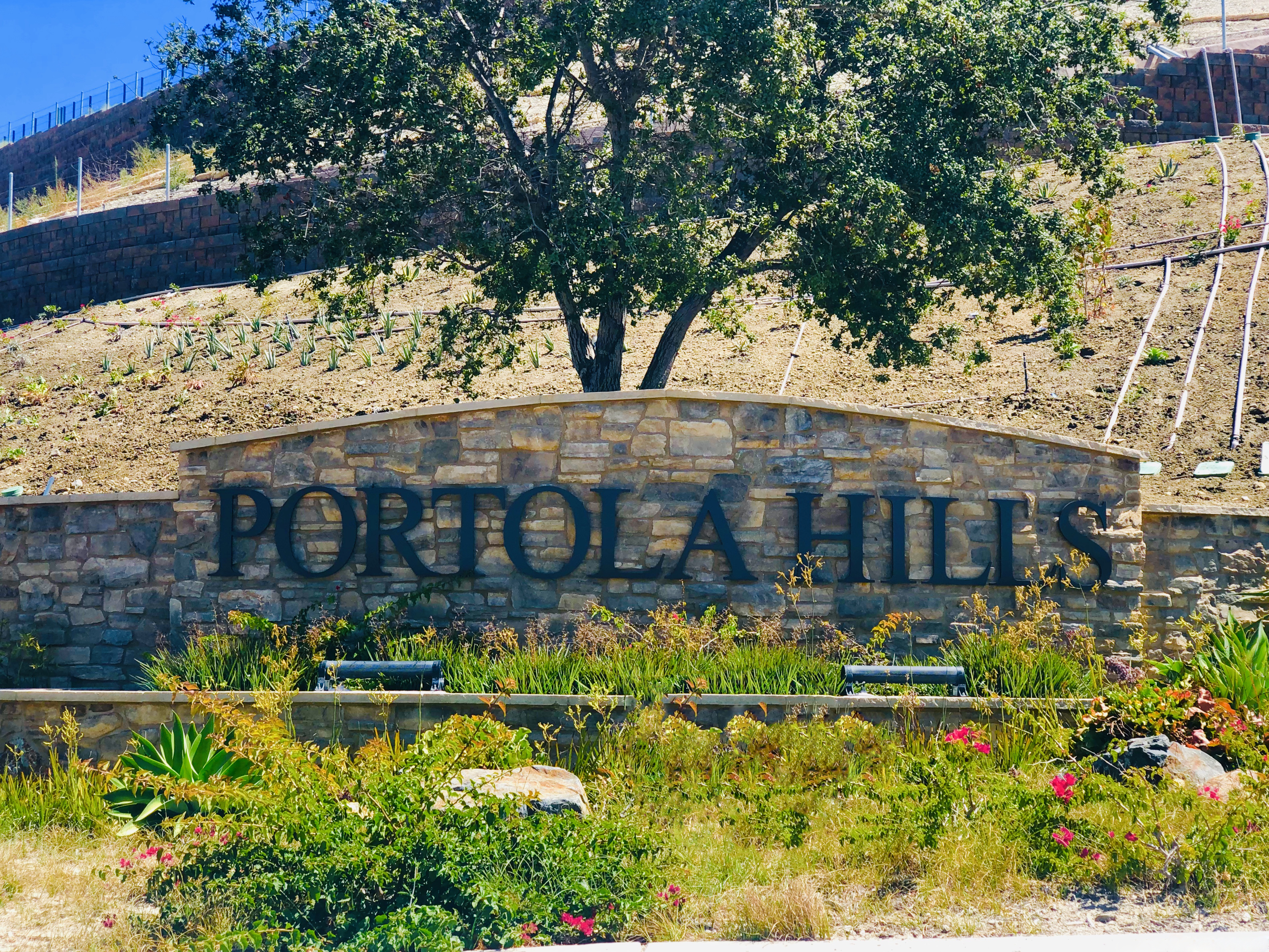
Entrance to Portola Hills

According to the United States Census Bureau, the CDP has a total area of 1.3 square miles (3.4 km^{2}), all land. It is built on the foothills of the Santa Ana Mountains, and is the highest elevated region of Lake Forest.

== Demographics ==
Historical population
Census	Pop.	Note	%±
2000	6,391		—
U.S. Decennial Census; 1850–1870 1880-1890; 1900 1910 1920; 1930 1940 1950; 1960 1970 1980; 1990 2000 2010

Portola Hills first appeared as a census designated place in the 2000 U.S. census; and was deleted after being annexed by the city of Lake Forest prior to the 2010 U.S. census.

Portola Hills CDP, California – Racial and ethnic composition Note: the US Census treats Hispanic/Latino as an ethnic category. This table excludes Latinos from the racial categories and assigns them to a separate category. Hispanics/Latinos may be of any race.
Race / Ethnicity (NH = Non-Hispanic)	Pop 2000	% 2000
White alone (NH)	4,998	78.20%
Black or African American alone (NH)	101	1.58%
Native American or Alaska Native alone (NH)	14	0.22%
Asian alone (NH)	425	6.65%
Native Hawaiian or Pacific Islander alone (NH)	8	0.13%
Other race alone (NH)	13	0.20%
Mixed race or Multiracial (NH)	191	2.99%
Hispanic or Latino (any race)	641	10.03%
Total	6,391	100.00%

As of the census of 2000, there were 6,391 people, 2,164 households, and 1,729 families residing in the CDP. The population density was 5,063.6 inhabitants per square mile (1,955.1/km^{2}). There were 2,181 housing units at an average density of 1,728.0 per square mile (667.2/km^{2}). The racial makeup of the CDP was 84.60% White, 1.63% African American, 0.30% Native American, 6.76% Asian, 0.13% Pacific Islander, 2.64% from other races, and 3.94% from two or more races. Hispanic or Latino of any race were 10.03% of the population.

There were 2,164 households, out of which 52.4% had children under the age of 18 living with them, 69.4% were married couples living together, 8.1% had a female householder with no husband present, and 20.1% were non-families. 14.0% of all households were made up of individuals, and 1.4% had someone living alone who was 65 years of age or older. The average household size was 2.95 and the average family size was 3.30.

In the CDP, the age distribution of the population shows 32.9% under the age of 18, 4.9% from 18 to 24, 41.4% from 25 to 44, 18.0% from 45 to 64, and 2.9% who were 65 years of age or older. The median age was 33 years. For every 100 females, there were 97.4 males. For every 100 females age 18 and over, there were 92.2 males.

Estimated median household income in 2016: $126,434 (it was $90,874 in 2000) Estimated per capita income in 2016: $50,437 (it was $34,057 in 2000)

== Politics ==
In the state legislature Portola Hills is located in the 37th Senate District, represented by Republican John Moorlach, and in the 68th Assembly District, represented by Republican Steven Choi. Federally, Portola Hills is located in California's 45th congressional district, which is represented by Democrat Katie Porter.

== Housing ==
The community of Portola Hills has 2,181 housing units on 348.8 acres (141.2 ha) of land with an average housing density of 6.25 per acre (15.4/ha).

There are 15 tracts of housing built in single and multi-family configurations that can be classified as Condominium, Townhouse, Mix use, Semi-Detached and Detached:

- Condominium – 2 tracts (Canyon View and Canyon View West) with a total of 225 units (18.5 units/acre) featuring 1 and 2 bedroom floorplans (644 to 1038 sqft);
- Townhouse – 3 tracts (Bella Palermo, Canyon Rim, and Montecido) with a total of 657 units (9.6 to 13.3 units/acre) featuring 2 and 3 bedroom floorplans (940 to 1378 sqft);
- Semi Detached – 2 tracts (Serenado and Sycamore Ridge) with a total of 378 units (5.1 to 8.9 units/acre) featuring 2 and 3 bedroom floorplans (1139 to 1891 sqft); and
- Detached – 7 tracts (Alderwood, Antiqua, J.M. Peters Portola, Crestmont, Crown Pointe, Live Oak Estates, Portola Hills Estates, and The Oaks) with a total of 921 units (3.1 to 7.4 units/acre) featuring 3 to 6 bedroom floorplans (1273 to 3584 sqft).
- Mix Use – 1 tract with a total of 54 units featuring 1 bedroom floorplans.

== Schools ==
Children living in the area attend Portola Hills Elementary.

Built in the mid-1990s, Portola Hills Elementary was subject to litigation between the SVUSD school district and the developer concerning land movement at the school site. The litigation was dismissed due to procedural issues regarding the statute of limitations. In 2004, three buildings were vacated for safety reasons due to damage potentially caused by the land movement and the students relocated in portable/temporary classrooms until a permanent solution could be made. As of mid-2008, the developer (USA Portola Center, LLC) entered into a School Facilities Funding and Mitigation Agreement with the school district for development originally known as "Portola Hills South" and now known as "Portola Center." That agreement requires the developer to pay the district $2,900,000 (in addition to any other new development mitigation fees), solely for use in the repair of the school. As of June 2008, the district is moving forward with plans to repair two buildings and potentially demolish/rebuild the third provided approval is obtained from the Department of State Architecture.
