= San Juan Hills High School =

Location
- 29211 Stallion Ridge; San Juan Capistrano, California 92675; United States; 33°30′5″N 117°37′21″W

Information
- Type: Public High School
- Established: 2007
- School district: Capistrano Unified School District
- Principal: Cina Abedzadeh
- Teaching staff: 124.32 (FTE)
- Grades: 9-12
- Enrollment: 2,768 (2023–2024)
- Student to teacher ratio: 22.27
- Colors: Navy, gold, and white
- Athletics conference: CIF Southern Section; Coast View Athletic Association
- Nickname: Stallions
- Newspaper: The Express
- Yearbook: The Legacy
- Website: sanjuanhills.capousd.org
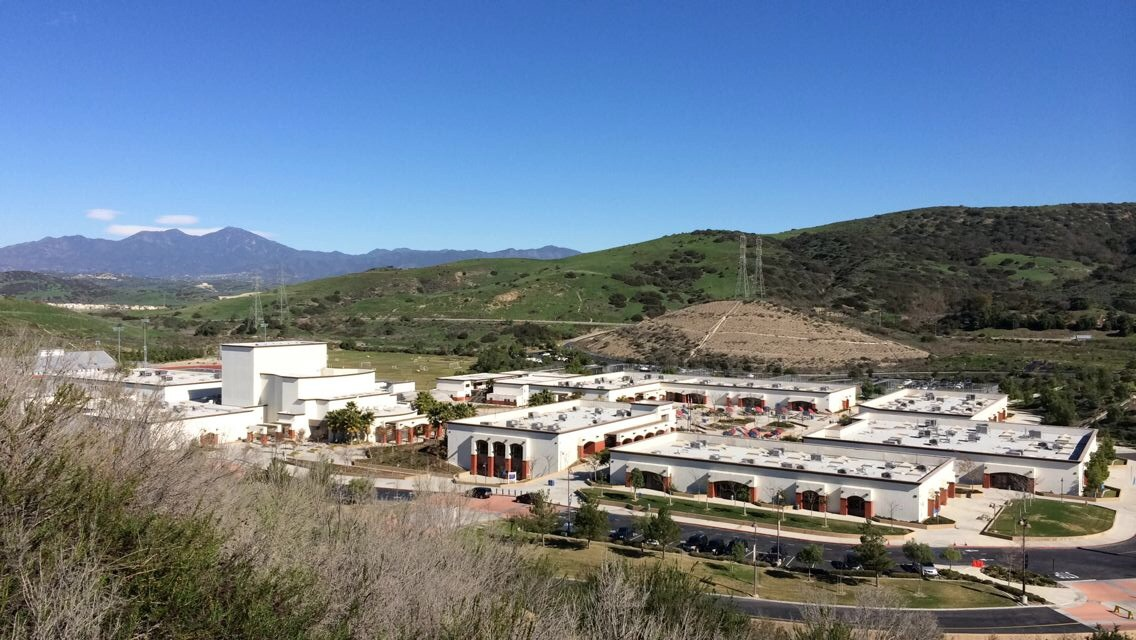

San Juan Hills High School is a high school located in San Juan Capistrano, California, and it is the sixth high school of the Capistrano Unified School District. The school officially opened in the 2007–2008 school year as a new comprehensive high school and it serves the residents of San Juan Capistrano, Talega of San Clemente, Capistrano Beach, and southern Ladera Ranch in Orange County, California.

== Arts and athletics ==
San Juan Hills has: an art program, volleyball, baseball, pep squad, basketball, football, golf, lacrosse, soccer, tennis, water polo, softball, cross country, surfing, swimming, wrestling and track & field teams.

== Notable alumni ==
- Sean Rhyan, NFL player for the Green Bay Packers
