= San Clemente High School (California) =

Public high school in San Clemente, California, United States

Coordinates: 33.4406°N 117.6159°W

Location
- 700 Avenida Pico; San Clemente, California 92673; United States

Information
- Type: Public
- Established: 1964
- School district: Capistrano Unified School District
- Principal: Brad Baker
- Teaching staff: 116.03 (FTE)
- Grades: 9 through 12
- Enrollment: 2,740 (2024-2025)
- Student to teacher ratio: 23.61
- Colors: Black and Red
- Athletics conference: CIF Southern Section; Coast View Athletic Association
- Nickname: Tritons
- Newspaper: Triton Times
- Website: https://sctritons.capousd.org

San Clemente High School is a high school in southern Orange County, California, in the town of San Clemente. San Clemente High's attendance boundaries include the City of San Clemente and parts of Capistrano Beach and San Juan Capistrano. The school has approximately 3000 students.

== History ==
The school opened in 1964, and the first graduating class was the class of 1965. The first class to have attended SCHS all four years graduated in 1967. In 1996, San Clemente High was noted as one of the few remaining “small town” high schools in Southern California. In 1999, the school was nominated as a National Blue Ribbon School by the U.S. Department of Education.

In 2007, San Clemente High School was ranked number 471 by Newsweek magazine. In 2012 it was ranked number 380.

In February 2012, an Orange County Sheriff's Department deputy shot and killed Marine Sergeant Manuel Loggins after Loggins failed to comply with the deputy's instructions while on school grounds. In 2013, the Orange Count Sheriff's Department settled with the Loggins family regarding a wrongful death lawsuit.

San Clemente's Academic Performance Index for the 2011–2012 school year was 844.

== Sports ==
The school offers a variety of athletic teams, which include wrestling, football, boys' and girls' tennis, surf team (national champions), boys' and girls' waterpolo and swim teams, girls' soccer (nationally ranked), boys' soccer (two-time State Champions), girls' and boys' basketball, girls and boys volleyball, cross-country and track, boys' and girls' lacrosse, boys/girls golf, boys' baseball, and girls' softball.

In 2006 the San Clemente Varsity cheer squad brought home a national championship, beating out 22 other teams.

In 2010, the San Clemente baseball team ranked 23rd in California, and 121st in the nation. The baseball team has more players playing at the next level (college) than any other sport in the school.

In 2016, San Clemente baseball team earned a national title after winning first place at the National Highschool Invitational (NHSI).

In 2016, San Clemente football won the CIF-SS Championship along with the State Championship.

In 2014, San Clemente had its first ever state champion in track and field.

== Fine arts ==
The Triton fine arts department includes: Triton Marching Alliance, Jazz Band, color guard, drumline, dance team, Women's Ensemble, Men's Ensemble, Bel Canto, A Capella, Madrigals, String Orchestra, Chamber Orchestra, Advanced Band, Symphony Orchestra, and Wind Ensemble.

The marching band is known as the Triton Marching Alliance. They compete in the 3A division SCJA. The winter guard team took home a second-place title at the WGASC Championship in 2011 creating a winning impression that lasted throughout the season with two first place titles and two 2nd place titles. In 2011, the Triton Marching Alliance was invited by the Governor of California to perform in the National Memorial Day parade in Washington D.C., in which San Clemente was one of two schools that represented California.

The choirs have performed in various venues ranging from New York's Carnegie Hall to the University of Hawaii. The choir department consists of three auditioned choirs (Madrigals, A Capella, and Bel Canto) and two beginner choirs (women's and men's ensemble). In 1999, an alumnus of the SCHS choir department died and left the music department with a donation of $10,000 in his will. That money continues to be used in rewarding students with exceptional talents in music in a manner that encourages their continuance of music in college.

The string and band department has played in venues across Europe and in New York and Hawaii.

The dance team in 2013 came home with three national champion titles for medium dance, intermediate dance, and best overall choreographed dance, marking its 14th national title in the last 10 years.

The drama department, which consists of hundreds of students as well as the parent booster club, was recognized with a Macy Award for the play Curtains.

== Notable alumni ==
- Kolby Allard, professional baseball pitcher for Texas Rangers
- Coby Bell, television actor, Third Watch, The Game
- Tiffany Brissette, actress, Small Wonder
- Lauren Brzykcy, professional soccer player
- Sam Darnold, Super Bowl LX-winning NFL quarterback for the Seattle Seahawks
- Brian de la Puente (born 1985), former NFL player
- Connor De Phillippi, race car driver
- Jorge Garcia, actor, Lost
- Gabriel Gardner, member of 2008 Beijing Olympics men's volleyball team, gold medalist
- Sean Harlow, NFL guard for the New York Giants
- Megan Henderson, news anchor/reporter for KTLA television in Los Angeles
- Eric Hester, film composer
- Jackson Hinkle, co-founder of the American Communist Party, political commentator, conspiracy theorist and social media influencer
- Trevor Insley, former NFL wide receiver, Indianapolis Colts, 2000–2003
- Rian Johnson, director and screenwriter, notably Star Wars: The Last Jedi; most of his 2006 film Brick was filmed on and around school grounds
- Dean Karnazes, ultra-marathoner
- Masafumi Kawaguchi, football player, International Federation of American Football 1999 World Cup
- Tessa Keller, star of MTV's Laguna Beach: The Real Orange County
- Bill Kenney, quarterback, Kansas City Chiefs, 1980–1988
- Kian Lawley, YouTuber and actor
- Colin McPhillips, professional long boarder
- Wayne Miller, guitarist for metal band “Bleed The Sky”
- Kyle Murphy, offensive tackle for Green Bay Packers
- Edith Ramirez, chairwoman, Federal Trade Commission
- Isaac Rex, college football player
- Chase Rettig, quarterback, Boston College and Green Bay Packers
- David Roditi, tennis player and coach
- Ryan Sheckler, professional skateboarder
- Katie Vernola, Playboy Playmate, June 2010
- Rachel York, Broadway, film and television actress, original name Rachel Lemanski
- Danielle Weatherholt, professional footballer
