= Foothill Ranch, California =

Human settlement in California, United States of America

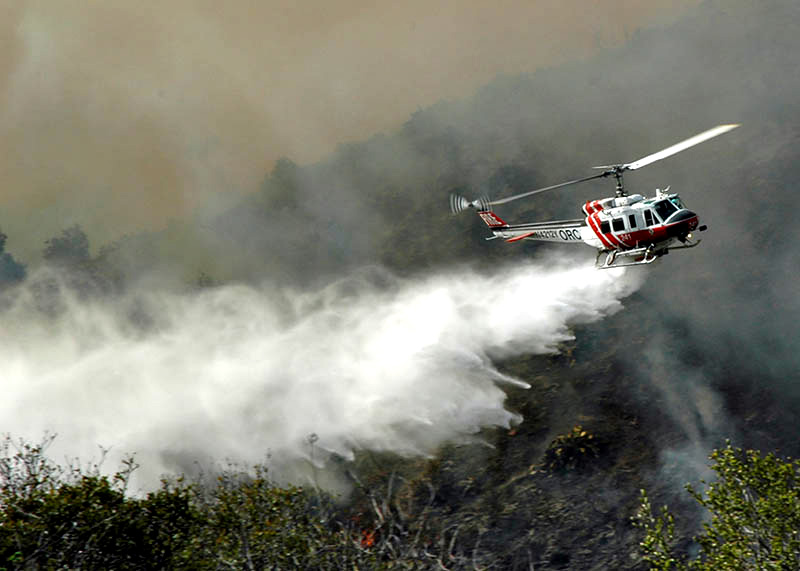
The Santiago Fire being sprayed by a helicopter in Foothill Ranch

Foothill Ranch is a neighborhood of the city of Lake Forest in Orange County, California, United States. The population was 10,899 at the 2000 census. The master planned community was a census-designated place prior to being incorporated into the city in 2000.

Foothill Ranch is notable for being the headquarters of Oakley, Inc., and ProBoards. Other companies such as Nike, Kaiser Aluminum, Kawasaki, and TAE Technologies also have offices in Foothill Ranch. It is also the home of Saddleback Church.

== Geography ==
Foothill Ranch is located at 33°41′19″N 117°39′51″W. According to the United States Census Bureau, the CDP has a total area of 2.8 square miles (7.3 km^{2}), all of it land. The ZIP Code for Foothill Ranch is 92610.

== Demographics ==
As of the census of 2000, there were 10,899 people, 3,816 households, and 2,976 families residing in the CDP. The population density was 3,858.8 inhabitants per square mile (1,489.9/km^{2}). There were 3,873 housing units at an average density of 1,371.2 per square mile (529.4/km^{2}). The racial makeup of the CDP was 74.38% White, 1.92% Black or African American, 0.29% Native American, 14.96% Asian, 0.28% Pacific Islander, 3.38% from other races, and 4.78% from two or more races. 10.85% of the population were Hispanic or Latino of any race.

There were 3,816 households, out of which 49.9% had children under the age of 18 living with them, 69.2% were married couples living together, 5.9% had a female householder with no husband present, and 22.0% were non-families. 16.3% of all households were made up of individuals, and 0.7% had someone living alone who was 65 years of age or older. The average household size was 2.86 and the average family size was 3.27.

In the CDP, the population was spread out, with 31.5% under the age of 18, 4.1% from 18 to 24, 47.5% from 25 to 44, 14.6% from 45 to 64, and 2.3% who were 65 years of age or older. The median age was 32 years. For every 100 females, there were 99.5 males. For every 100 females age 18 and over, there were 96.9 males.

The median income for a household in the CDP was $89,038, and the median income for a family was $97,897. Males had a median income of $67,791 versus $41,786 for females. The per capita income for the CDP was $36,013. About 1.4% of families and 1.6% of the population were below the poverty line, including 2.0% of those under age 18 and none of those age 65 or over. Foothill Ranch was completed in 1996 and was annexed to Lake Forest in 2000.

== Politics ==
In the state legislature, Foothill Ranch is located in the 37th Senate District, represented by Republican Steven Choi, and in the 72nd Assembly District, represented by Republican Diane Dixon (politician).

In the United States House of Representatives, Foothill Ranch is in California's 40th congressional district, represented by Republican Young Kim.
