= Kovic =

Kovic may be a shortened form of South Slavic surnames ending with -ković as well as a surname by itself. Notable people with the surname include:

- Biana Kovic, Cvetkovic, Serbian cellist and film maker
- Kajetan Kovič (1931–2014) Slovene poet, writer, translator, and journalist
- Miloš Ković (born 1969), Serbian historian and university professor
- Ron Kovic (born 1946), American anti-war activist

== Fictional characters ==
- PFC Ković, a Serbian soldier in a video game Quake 4
- Lazlo Ković, a character in a video games Battlefield 3, and Battlefield 4
