= Novaković =

Novaković (Serbian Cyrillic: Новаковић) is a Serbian, Montenegrin and Croatian surname, a patronymic derived from the male given name Novak (meaning "the new one"). It is rendered as Novakovič in Slovenian, and historically anglicized as Novakovich. It may refer to:

- Aleksandar Novaković, Serbian writer
- Bojana Novakovic, Serbian-Australian actress
- Borislav Novaković, Serbian politician
- Damjan Novaković (born 1966), Slovenian basketball player and coach
- Eveline Novakovic, British video game music composer
- Igor Novaković, Croatian footballer
- Josip Novakovich, Croatian-American writer
- Lola Novaković, Serbian singer
- Milivoje Novaković, Slovenian footballer
- Mitar Novaković, Montenegrin footballer
- Nebojša Novaković, Swedish retired footballer
- Nenad Novaković, Serbian football goalkeeper
- Phebe Novakovic, American businesswoman
- Stojanka Novaković Stoja, Serbian pop-folk singer

== See also ==
- Kovic (disambiguation)
