= Plava Voda =

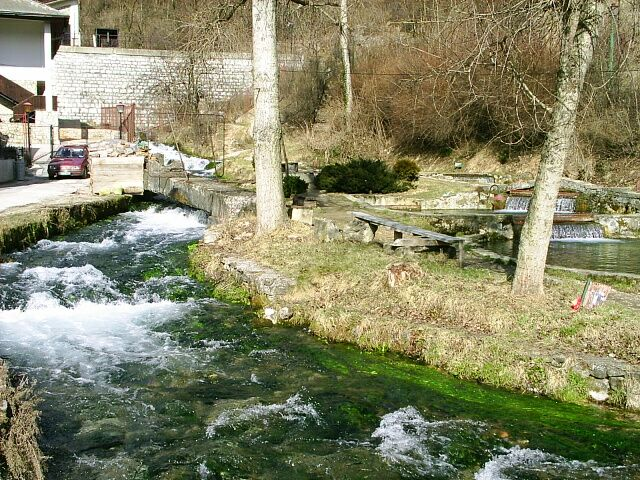
- Plava Voda wellspring, main outlet hidden behind an old stone wall as seen in upper center-left corner

- Location within Bosnia and Herzegovina

Location
- Country: Bosnia and Herzegovina
- Municipality: Travnik

Physical characteristics
- Source: Plava Voda
  - location: Old Town of Travnik
  - coordinates: 44.230751°N 17.671659°E
  - elevation: 450 m (1,480 ft)
- Mouth: Lašva
  - location: Travnik, the eastern town gate
  - coordinates: 44.229221°N 17.673901°E
  - elevation: 400 m (1,300 ft)
- Length: 350 m (1,150 ft)
- Discharge
  - minimum: 2,000 L/s (71 cu ft/s)
  - maximum: 3,000 L/s (110 cu ft/s)

Basin features
- Progression: Lašva→ Bosna→ Sava→ Danube→ Black Sea
- River system: Black Sea
- Landmarks: Travnik Castle
- Waterbodies: 2 fish farm basins

Plava Voda (Blue Water) is a large spring, which creates approximately 350 metres long eponymous river, in Travnik, Bosnia and Herzegovina. It rises under Vlašić mountain, just below Travnik Castle, in the centre of Old Town of Travnik.

== Geography ==
The Plava Voda springs out of a large slit at the bottom of a mountainside, which is situated within the narrow depression in Travnik's Old Town (Ćaršija) neighborhood, in the heart of the city. Immediately above the wellspring rises an old Travnik's citadel, the Travnik Castle. The river runs through part of an Old Town Travnik, and after roughly 300 metres it reaches and spills into the Lašva river near the eastern town's gate.

== Utilization and protection ==
Wellspring of Plava Voda is a city's main source of potable water. It is also one of the main attractions of Travnik's rich natural and cultural-historic heritage. Areal around the wellspring, comprising Old Town is declared National Monument of Bosnia and Herzegovina on 26 April 2013.

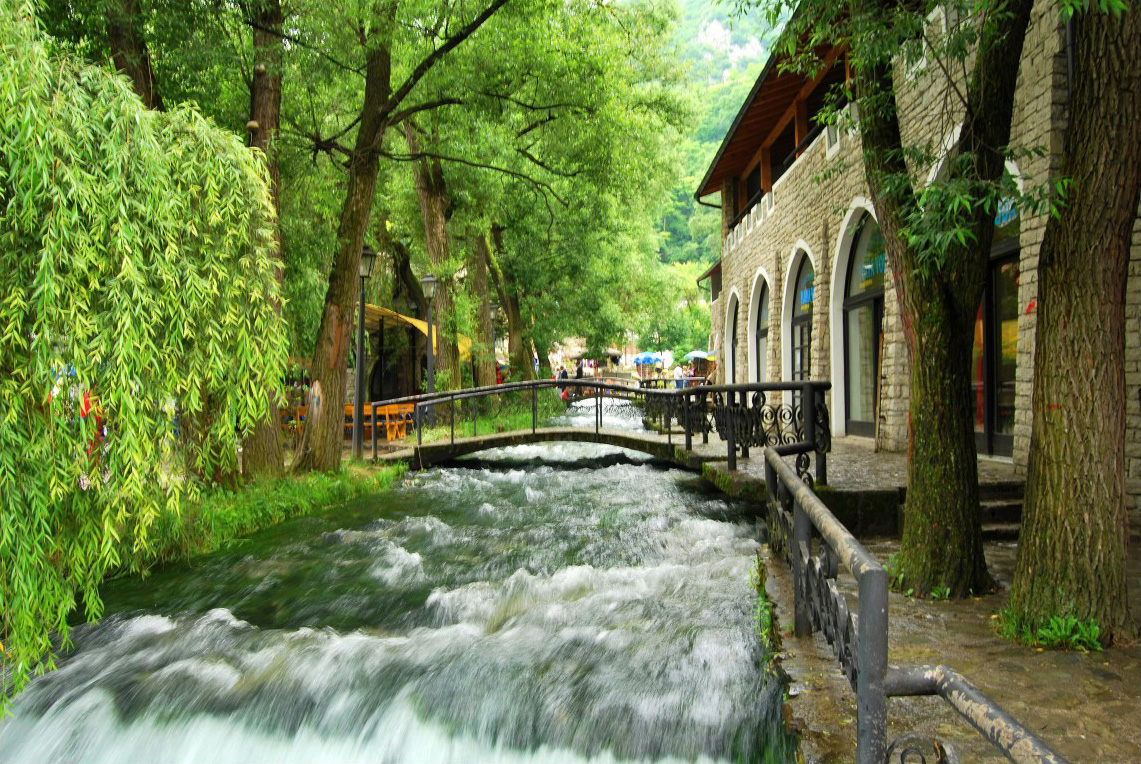
The Plava Voda runs through part of an Old Town Travnik stacked with cafe-bars and restaurants, frequently visited by locals and tourists alike.

The Plava Voda runs through part of an Old Town Travnik stacked with cafe-bars and restaurants, popular with both locals and tourists.

Recently, fear have been growing in Travnik that spring's discharge could be significantly depleted, while natural and cultural ambient of entire areal spoiled, as plans for further development of water utilization have gained political backings at local and state levels.
