= Olja Knežević =

Montenegrin novelist

- Born: Olja Raičević; 10 April 1968 (age 58); Titograd, SR Montenegro, SFR Yugoslavia
- Occupation: Author

Olja Raičević Knežević (born 10 April 1968) is a Croatia-based Montenegrin novelist.

Her 2019 novel Katarina, velika i mala, which received that year's V.B.Z. Award, was translated into English the following year as Catherine the Great and the Small; it is considered the first contemporary novel by a Montenegrin woman author to be published in English translation.

== Biography ==
Olja Knežević was born in Podgorica, Montenegro, in 1968. After spending her childhood in Montenegro, she moved as a teenager to California, where she graduated from Capistrano Valley High School.

In the 1990s, she participated in humanitarian work during the Yugoslav Wars, and worked as a journalist, editor, and interpreter on a radio ship in international waters. Having studied English language and literature at the University of Belgrade, she received a master's degree in creative writing from Birkbeck College in London in 2008. After living in London for 10 years, Knežević moved to Zagreb, Croatia, where she is currently based.

She has published three novels and one book of autobiographical short stories. Her first novel, Milena & Other Social Reforms, was originally written in English as an adaptation of Knežević's master's thesis and later self-published. It was then translated into Montenegrin as Milena & druge društvene reforme and published by an independent publisher in Montenegro. Despite its subversive message that drew opposition from the Montenegrin government, it quickly sold out its first pressing and has since been reprinted, and published in other countries of the region like Croatia and Serbia. Milena & druge društvene reforme was followed by the autobiographical short story collection Londonske priče juga in 2013 and the novel Gospođa Black in 2015.

Her short stories were honored by the advocacy group Amnesty International.

Her fourth book, Katarina, velika i mala, won a major regional prize, the Croatian publishing house V.B.Z.'s annual V.B.Z. Award, in 2019. Katarina, velika i mala was translated into English as Catherine the Great and the Small by Paula Gordon and Ellen Elias-Bursać, and published in 2020.

It is thought to be the first contemporary novel by a Montenegrin woman author to be published in English translation.

In 2022, this novel was translated into German, as Katharina die Grosse und die Kleine, which also makes Knežević the first woman novelist from Montenegro to be translated into German and published in Germany.

Knežević's writing is rooted in Montenegrin culture and history, through a feminist and, often, immigrant lens.

== Selected works ==
- Milena & Other Social Reforms (novel, 2011)
  - Milena & druge društvene reforme (Montenegrin translation, 2011)
- Londonske priče juga (stories, 2013)
- Gospođa Black (novel, 2015)
- Katarina, velika i mala (novel, 2019)
  - Catherine, Great and Small (English translation, 2020)
  - Katharina die Grosse und die Kleine (German translation, 2022)
