= V.B.Z. =

Croatian publishing company

V.B.Z. d.o.o. is a Croatian publishing company including bookstores and online sale.

== About ==
The publishing company was founded in 1991 and includes bookstores and online sale with branches in Bosnia and Herzegovina (2003), Slovenia (2002) and Serbia (2007). Store headquarter is located in Zagreb. The publishing assortment consists of publications on health, alternative medicine, esoteric literature, popular psychology, cooking, household and garden, popular science, natural science, economics, informatics, atlases, dictionaries, travel guide books, linguistics, literary theory, poetry as well as prose of contemporary authors and English-speaking editions. Currently, the Croatian company is owner of bookstores in Zagreb, Velika Gorica, Rijeka, Slavonski Brod, Čakovec, Split, Solin and Zadar. The founder and proprietor of the publishing house was the well respected entrepreneur Boško Zatežalo who died in 2014.

The publishing house encourages, supports and promotes young or partially unknown writers with this literary prize, which has been awarded annually (excepting 2012, 2013 and 2017) for the Best Unpublished Novel of the Year since 2002. The submitted manuscript must be written in Croatian or Shtokavian as well as the Chakavian and Kajkavian literary language.

Laureates

- 2002 Josip Mlakić for Živi i mrtvi (Living and Dead).
- 2003 Jelena Marković for Escajg za teletinu (Cutlery For Veal) and Marinko Koščec for Wonderland.
- 2004 Davor Špišić for Koljivo (Wheat).
- 2005 Nura Bazdulj-Hubijar for Kad je bio juli (When It Was Juli).
- 2006 Hrvoje Šalković for Pravi se da ovo nisi vidio (Pretend You Didn't See That).
- 2007 Svjetlana Gjoni for Nula nemo (Zero Nothing).
- 2008 Predrag Crnković for Beograd za pokojnike(Belgrade For Deadones).
- 2009 Dragan Pavelić for Proljeće u Karolinentalu (Spring in Karlin).
- 2010 Aleksandar Novaković for Vođa (Water).
- 2011 Ankica Tomić for Naročito ljeti (Summer Special).
- 2014 Ivica Prtenjača for Brdo (Hill).
- 2015 Marina Vujčić for Susjed (The Neighbour).
- 2016 Lada Vukić for Specijalna potreba (Special Need) and Ivica Ivanišević for Knjiga žalbe (Military Commands Compendium).
- 2018 Marina Šur Puhlovski for Divljakuša (Savage).
- 2019 Olja Raičević-Knežević for Katarina, velika i mala (Katherine, Big and Small).
- 2020 Žarko Jovanovski, Pizzeria Europa.
- 2021 Ivica Prtenjača, Sine, idemo Kući (Son, let's go Home).
- 2022, Dragan Jurak, Peléov Priručnik (Pele's Notebook).
- 2023, Nebojša Lujanović, Tvornica Hrvata (Croatian Factory).
- 2024, Goran Samardžić, Grobar pasa (Gravediggerdog).
