= Marinko Koščec =

Croatian writer

Marinko Koščec (born 29. December 1967 in Zagreb, Yugoslavia) is a Croatian academic, novelist, and professor of French literature. He holds a PhD on Michel Houellebecq’s work, has served as honorary chairman of the Croatian Writers’ Society since 2008, and is the author of seven novels.

== Life and work ==
Koščec studied English and French languages and their literatures at the Faculty of Humanities and Social Sciences in Zagreb, completing a diploma thesis titles Man In Search Of His Double - the world seen through the work of J. M. G. Le Clézio (L'Homme en quête de son double – le monde vu à travers l’oeuvre de J. M. G. Le Clézio, 1992). He continued his education at Ohio State University (1989) and the Institut Catholique de Paris (1990), and completed a magister degree thesis on Figuration of Unsaid in Contemporary Novel (Figuration du non-dit dans le roman contemporaine, 1995) at Diderot University Paris. His PhD was completed with a thesis on the Poetry of Michel Houellebecq, Narrative, Stylistics and Contextual Study of Opus (Poetika Michela Houellebecqa. Naratološka, stilistička i kontekstualna studija opusa, 2005) in Zagreb. Koščec is a Professor of French literature at the department of Romance studies, Faculty of Humanities and Social Sciences; since 2008 he has been the honorary chairman of the Croatian Writers' Society, which advocates for literary artists and trade union protection. Author of seven novels and laureate of V.B.Z. Award (2003), and Croatian translator of the novels Whatever and Atomised, his novels A Handful of Sand and Centimetre of Happiness has been published in English (2013) and Dutch (2014).

== Bibliography ==
- Otok pod morem (Island Under Sea), Feral Tribune, Split 1999, ISBN 953-635930-8.
- Netko drugi (Someone Else), Konzor, Zagreb 2001, ISBN 953-6317-78-8.
- Wonderland, VBZ, Zagreb 2003, ISBN 953-201-330-X.
- To malo pijeska na dlanu (A Handful Of Sand), Profil international, Zagreb 2005, ISBN 953-120-159-5.
- Michel H. : mirakul, mučenik, manipulator? (Michel H.: Miraculus, Martyr, Manipulator?), Izdanja Antibarbarus, Zagreb 2007, ISBN 978-953-249-036-7.
- Centimetar od sreće (Centimetre Of Happiness), Profil international, Zagreb 2008, ISBN 978-953-120907-6.
- Četvrti čovjek (The Fourth Man), Algoritam, Zagreb 2011, ISBN 978-953-316-534-9.
- A Handful Of Sand, Istros Books & Peter Owen Publishers, London 2013, ISBN 978-1-908236-07-4.
- Een centimeter vanaf het geluk (Centimetre of Happiness), KLIN, Amsterdam 2014, ISBN 978-94-9216000-3.
- U potrazi za početkom kruga (In Pursuit Of The Beginning Of Circle), Sandorf, Zagreb 2016, ISBN 978-953-7715-89-2.
