= Aleksandar Novaković =

Serbian writer and playwright (born 1975)

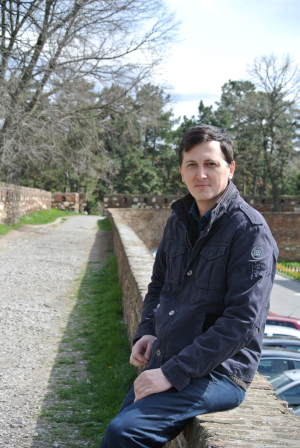

Aleksandar Novaković (Serbian-Cyrillic: Александар Новаковић; born 9 January 1975 in Belgrade, Yugoslavia) is a Serbian writer, playwright, historian, musician and political activist.

== Life and work ==
Aleksandar Novaković grew up in his hometown and attended the XII Belgrade Gymnasium in Voždovac city quarter, graduating with a maturity diploma in 1994. He then began studying at the department of history of the Philosophical Faculty of Belgrade’s University and graduated in 2002 with diploma. He changed to the University of Arts and continued his education in theater studies and dramaturgy. In 2007, Novaković (magister since 2006) was supported by John McGrath scholarship of the University of Edinburgh. In 2012, he obtained his doctorate with thesis on Strangers as dramatis personae in Serbian drama 1734-1990 (Stranci kao dramatis personae u srpskoj drami 1734-1990). Novaković has been lecturing on theater history and dramatic theory at the New Academy of Arts since 2014. The writer published profiles on LinkedIn as well as Facebook, he uploaded different videos as Alasdair MacFearnua to YouTube (Alasdair means Alexander; MacFearnua is a composition of prefix Mac, fear means man and nua means new: an obvious allusion to the meaning of his surname Novaković), edits the blog Nowakowsky - My Life, My Writing and his personal website is focused on his multifaceted literary work. He has also been writing for Radio Belgrade for some years and his personal selection of recorded broadcasts is available on Mixcloud. The artist has also been creative as a guitarist in bands for many years and some of the musical tastings can be heard on Bandcamp. He is (shrowded with monicker Setanta) guitarist and lyricist of two-piece electronic-rock band Afterparty whose music is also presented on Bandcamp.

The author of eight novels is also a member of the editorial board of the Serbian web magazine Eckermann, named after the close confidant of Goethe, the author of the work Dichtung und Wahrheit (Poetry and Truth). The German word Dichtung can be used synonymously for fiction or falsehood. Reading Novaković's novels is a time travel into the past, the future or the present, but in any case they usually include stories of people and their personal way to falsehood and truth of own life in search of happiness and authentic self-fulfillment. No matter, whether a reader is accompanying the Serbian journalist on his trip to Scotland like in the novel Celtic tales or meeting a young playwright like in the novel Glacier, studying a future despot and his power politics in the year 2030 in the book Novo Smederevo or getting told the story about the Glorious One Duško Popović, a volunteer of Spanish Civil War with biographical details from the real life of Božidar Petrović, all works of the writer are worth to be discovered. The award-winning novel The Leader tells about an unscrupulous and inhumane officer of the Royal Serbian Army and his handling of his recent past (Balkan Wars). The historian Novaković concentrates the plot to a certain day: the Vidovdan of the year 1914, when the assassination of the Austrian heir apparent took place in Sarajevo. The content of the novel is a rejection of justifying arguments by representatives of Greater Serbian ideology as well as of violence and war as political means and exposes various arguments of nationalist conspiracy theorists as stereotypical absurdity. The manuscript of his unpublished novel Regulator has been nominated for the final selection of the Miroslav Dereta Award of the same named publishing house in 2007. It would be desirable for the writer to be presented to a wider reading public in Europe with translations in various languages. Aleksandar Novaković's short stories, satires, poems, reviews, political articles and essays has also been published in newspapers and magazines such as NIN, Književne vertikale, Koraci, Lipar, Reč, Polja, Zbornik Matice srpske, Afirmator, Beton, Povelja, Kvartal, Braničevo and some others. An aphorism of the artist, multiple laureate of twelve literary awards and former member of Aphoristic Circle Belgrade (Beogradski aforističarski krug) shall be cited finally: The truth is somewhere between, just that it is much closer to our side (Istina je negde između, samo što je mnogo bliža našoj strani).

Novaković was an active member of Serbian DiEM25 from June 2016 to June 2021 when he left the movement. In Serbia, Novaković was also one of the prominent members of leftist Partija radikalne levice (Party of Radical Left) and has held several high ranking functions in PRL before he left it in March 2021. He is one of the signatories of a petition in support of the former director of the National Library of Serbia, who was removed from office in 2012 because of political reasons. Among the signatories were personalities such as Filip David, Nenad Prokić, Mirko Đorđević and Biljana Srbljanović. The writer is also signatory of the declaration on the common language of the project languages and nationalisms. The declaration is against political separation of four Serbo-Croatian standard variants that leads to a series of negative social, cultural and political phenomena in which linguistic expression is enforced as a criterion of ethno-national affiliation and as a means of political loyalty in successor states of Yugoslavia. He is one of the founders of Društveni pokret Plamen (Social Movement Flame), the leftist organization founded in November 7th 2021 and writes articles for this movement.

== Bibliography (selection) ==
Theater and film studies

- Kako je Tito razbijao "tikve": istorija zabrane pozorišne predstave "Kad su cvetale tikve" Dragoslava Mihailovića (How Tito did smash the "pumpkins": history of the ban on the theater play "When the pumpkins blossomed" by Dragoslav Mihailović), Narodna knjiga–Alfa, Belgrade 2004, ISBN 86-331-0955-7.
- Mentalitet i (ne)istoričnost Slovena kao dramatis personae u dramama engleskog govornog područja (1878–1990) (Mentality and (non)historicity of the Slavs as dramatis personae in English written dramas: 1878-1990), Belgrade 2009.
- Razbijeno slovensko ogledalo ili Sloveni kao dramatis personae u dramama engleskog govornog područja (A broken Slavic mirror or Slavs as dramatis personae in the drama of the English-speaking area), Mali Nemo, Pančevo 2010, ISBN 978-86-7972-048-1.
- Nemci i Austrijanci u srpskoj drami: 1734–1990 (Germans and Austrians in Serbian drama), Požarevac 2016.
- Crnogorci u dramama srpskih autora: 1734-1990 (Montenegrins in the dramas of Serbian authors), Zbornik Matice srpska, Novi Sad 2016
- Srbi u američkom filmu (Serbs in American cinema (1925–2023)) Presing Belgrade, 2023
- Stranci u srpskoj drami(1734-1990) (Foreigners in Serbian theatrical plays (1734-1990) Presing Belgrade, 2023

Theater plays

- Sistem (The System), Premiere at National Theater Užice, 2001.
- Zubi (Teeth), Premiere at Serbian National Theater Novi Sad, 2004.
- Aladinova čarobna lampa (Aladdin's Magic Lamp), Premiere at Puppet theatre Pinokio Belgrade, 2007.
- Naš čovjek (Our Man; co-author), Premiere at Hercegnovsko pozorište, Herceg Novi, 2008.

Books of plays

- Bliskost : drame Matrijoška i Zubi (Closeness: dramas Matrioška and Teeth), Matična biblioteka "Svetozar Marković", Zaječar 2007, ISBN 86-86305-03-2.

Black Four - Crna četvorka (Zona satire, electronic book, 2007)

- Posle Utopije (After Utopia), Kulturni centar "Ribnica", Kraljevo 2009, ISBN 978-86-87783-02-7.

Books of aphorisms

- Pij Sokrate, država časti (Drink Socrates, A Toast to the State), Matica srpska, Novi Sad 1998.
- Neće moći (It Won't Work), Alma, Belgrade 2006, ISBN 86-84023-46-3.
- Malo li je (It's A Little Bit), Alma, Belgrade 2011, ISBN 978-86-7974-252-0.

Poetry

- Gitarista na Titaniku (Guitarist on board of RMS Titanic), Društvo za afirmaciju kulture Presing, Mladenovac 2013, ISBN 978-86-6341-006-0.

Troknjižje (with Marko Bačanović and Patrik Weiss), (Književne vertikale, Belgrade, 2020) Alkatrazi (Alcatrases) Presing, 2022

- Večnost i jedan dan (Eternity Plus One Day), UNKPS, 2023

Novels

- Glečer (Glacier), Dereta, Belgrade 2007, ISBN 978-86-7346-604-0.
- Keltska priča (Celtic tale), Mali Nemo, Pančevo 2008, ISBN 978-86-7972-036-8.
- Dva u jednom (Two in One), Mali Nemo, Pančevo 2009, ISBN 978-86-7972-042-9.
- Vođa (The Leader), VBZ, Zagreb 2010, ISBN 978-86-7998-197-4.
- Novo Smederevo (New Smederevo), KRR, Belgrade 2016, ISBN 978-86-6351-022-7.
- Gloriosa (The Glorious One), KRR, Belgrade 2017, ISBN 978-86-6351-036-4.
- Anfarwoldeb (The Immortality), KRR, Belgrade 2018, ISBN 978-86-6351-042-5.
- Rada Bayin (Udruženje nezavisnih pisaca Srbije, Belgrade, 2020)ISBN 978-86-81192-22-1.
- Dobro nam došle, drugarice iz trikotaže! (We welcome you, comradesses from the sportswear department!) (Udruženje nezavisnih pisaca Srbije, Belgrade, 2021.)
- "Šetnja Central Parkom" (A Walk Through Central Park) (Udruženje nezavisnih pisaca Srbije, Belgrade, 2023)
- "Statista" (An Extra) (co-author with Vuk Bogdanović) (Udruženje nezavisnih pisaca Srbije, Belgrade,2024)
- Znaš koga samo sreo? (Do You Know Whom I Just Met) (Neos izdavaštvo, Belgrade, 2024)
- Kako uloviti demona (How To Catch The Demon) (Udruženje nezavisnih pisaca Srbije, Belgrade, 2025)

Book of short stories:

Domino efekat (The Domino Effect, Eckermann, e-books, 2023) Surovina (Crude thing) (Presing, 2023)

== Filmography (selection) ==
- Parobrod Srbija (Steamship Serbia), RTS, screenwriter, political satire, season 2003-2004.
- Get Up You Lazy Bastard, short film, MKC Sistem, Belgrade 2006.
- Oralno doba, screenwriter, season 2008.
- Srušeni grad (Ruined City), short film, Belgrade, 2019

== Awards (selection) ==
- Golden Helmet Award (Zlatna kaciga) 1997 for satire
- Politika's Vib Award 1999 for aphorisms, he did not accept the prize at first; he subsequently accepted it in 2001.
- Radio Belgrade's second prize 2003 for radio play
- Josip-Kulundžić-Award 2004 for dramaturgy.
- Mali Nemo Award 2008 for Keltska priča (Celtic tale)
- VBZ Award 2010 for Vođa (The Leader)
- Radio Belgrade's first prize 2011 for radio documentary
- Festival Award of Belgrade's Aphoristic Circle 2017 for best satirical short story
