= Nura Bazdulj-Hubijar =

Bosnian writer, poet and playwright

- Born: Nura Bazdulj; 20 August 1951; Foča, PR Bosnia and Herzegovina, Yugoslavia
- Occupations: Writer, poet and playwrigh

Nura Bazdulj-Hubijar (born 20 August 1951) is a Bosnian writer, poet and playwright. Born near Foča, she attended school and medical college in Sarajevo after which she moved to Travnik. In addition to her work in medical microbiology, she has published many novels, poems and plays. She also contributes to children's magazines. She received the VBZ Award 2005.

== Bibliography ==
- Ja, slavni Ja (1988)
- Ruža (1990) ISBN 978-86-21-00447-8
- Ljubav je sihirbaz babo (1994)
- Naše međutim je rat (1995)
- Rosa canina (1996)
- Okrutnost raja (1997)
- Braća (1998) ISBN 978-9958-9421-1-2
- Amanet (1999) ISBN 978-9958-41-035-2
- Baš mi je žao (1999) ISBN 978-9958-731-03-7
- Kako sam ribu učio da pliva (2000) ISBN 978-9958-43-050-3
- Šta te muči, Tamaguči (2000) ISBN 978-9958-9768-0-3
- Bizarne storije (2001) ISBN 978-9958-10-408-4
- Čekajući Tahira: Ruža II (2002) ISBN 978-3-933263-94-0
- Sablja i pero (2002) ISBN 978-9958-39-013-5
- Priče o slovima (2002) ISBN 978-9958-10-443-5
- Duša i cvijet (2003) ISBN 978-9958-39-027-2
- Noć u brelima (2003) ISBN 978-9958-39-022-7
- Nevjestinski ponor (2004) ISBN 978-9958-666-59-9
- Kad je bio juli (2005) ISBN 978-953-201-527-0
- Više ne čekam Tahira: Ruža III (2008) ISBN 978-9958-41-287-5
- Smrt je došla prekasno (2008) ISBN 978-9958-41-246-2
- Priča o Zlatanu i vili izvorkinji (2008) ISBN 978-953-282-009-6
- Doba nevinosti (2008) ISBN 978-9958-38-394-6
- Plavi kombi (2009) ISBN 978-9958-41-355-1
- I ja njega volim: Plavi kombi II (2010)
- Sjećanje na plava brda (2010) ISBN 978-9958-41-416-9
- Spavaj Anđela (Amanet II) (2011) ISBN 978-9958-41-443-5
- Noć u brelima (2012) ISBN 978-9958-41-458-9
- Osluhni zašto plače (2013) ISBN 978-9958-41-503-6
