= Travnik =

- Town and municipality
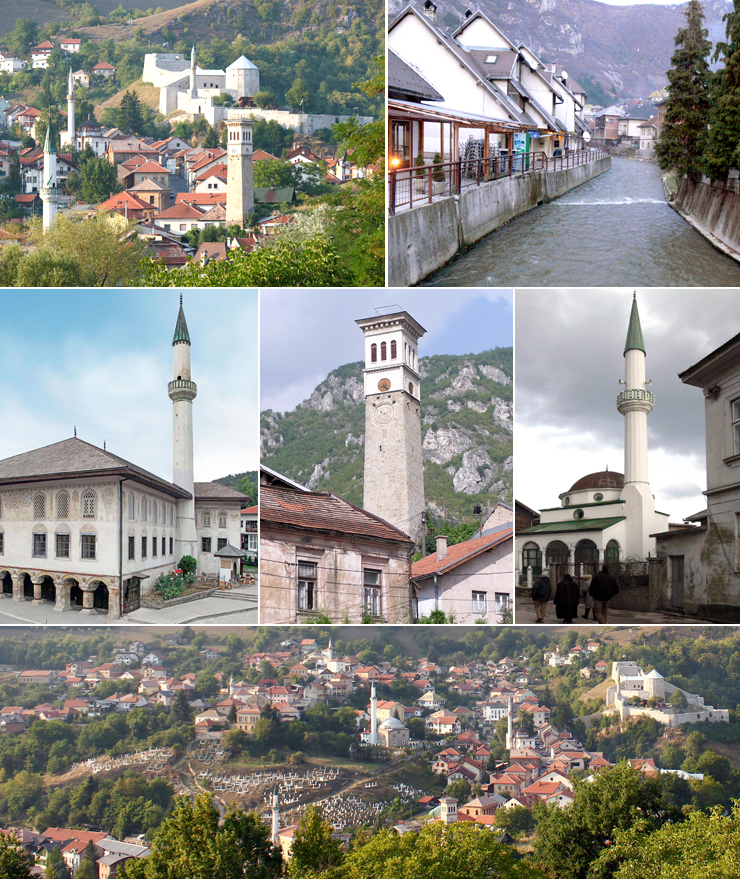
- Travnik

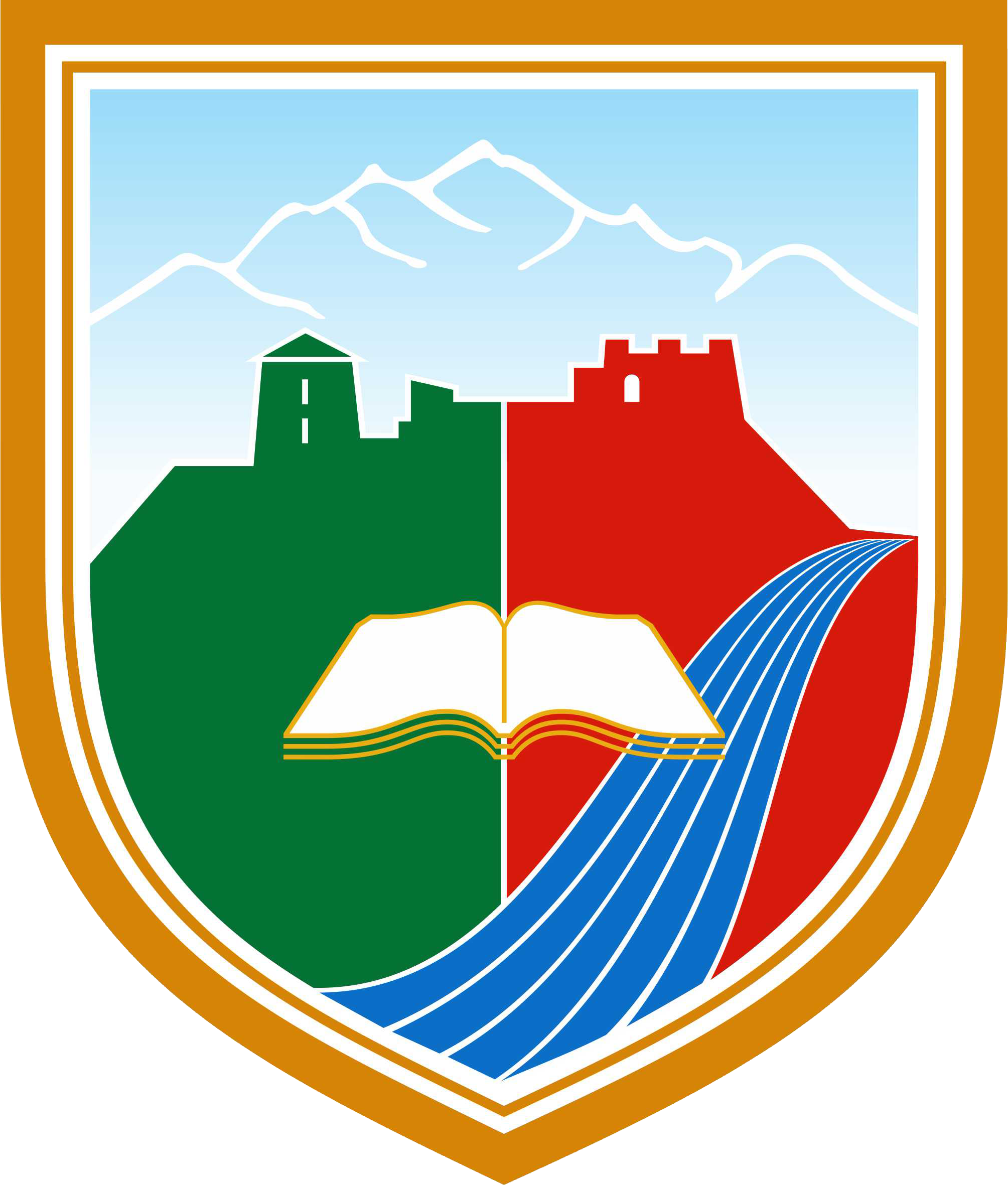
- Coat of arms

- Location of Travnik Municipality within Bosnia and Herzegovina.

- Location of Travnik within Bosnia and Herzegovina
- Coordinates: 44°13′35″N 17°39′35″E
- Country: Bosnia and Herzegovina
- Entity: Federation of Bosnia and Herzegovina
- Canton: Central Bosnia

Government
  - Municipal mayor: Kenan Dautović (SDA)

Area
  - Town and municipality: 529 km^{2} (204 sq mi)
- Elevation: 514 m (1,686 ft)

Population (2013 census)
  - Density: 101.1/km^{2} (262/sq mi)
  - Urban: 15,344
  - Municipality: 53,482
- Time zone: UTC+1 (CET)
  - Summer (DST): UTC+2 (CEST)
- Postal code: 72270
- Area code: +387 30
- Website: www.opcinatravnik.com.ba

Travnik is a town and a municipality in Bosnia and Herzegovina. It is the administrative center of the Central Bosnia Canton of the Federation of Bosnia and Herzegovina. It is situated in central Bosnia and Herzegovina, 90 kilometres (56 miles) west of Sarajevo. As of 2013, the town had a population of 15,344 inhabitants, while the municipality had 53,482 inhabitants.

Historically, it was the seat of the governors of Bosnia Eyalet from 1699 to 1850, for which it was also called Vizirtravnik during the Ottoman era. Travnik has a rich cultural and architectural heritage dating from that period.

== Geography ==
Travnik is located near the geographic center of Bosnia and Herzegovina at 44°14′N 17°40′E. The river Lašva passes through the town, flowing from west to east before joining the Bosna. Travnik itself is built in the large Lašva valley, which connects the Bosna river valley in the east with the Vrbas river valley in the west.

Travnik is found 514 metres (1,686 feet) above sea level. Its most distinguishing geographic feature are its mountains, Vilenica and Vlašić. Vlašić, named after the Vlachs, is one of the tallest mountains in the country at 1,933 metres (6,342 feet).

A large karst spring, the Plava Voda wellspring, rises under Vlašić mountain, just below Travnik Castle, in the very center of the Old Town of Travnik.

=== Climate ===
Travnik has a continental climate, located between the Adriatic sea to the South and Pannonia to the North. Average July temperature is 19.0 °C (66.2 °F). Average January temperature on the other hand is −1.0 °C (30.2 °F). It snows in Travnik every year.

Climate data for Travnik
Month	Jan	Feb	Mar	Apr	May	Jun	Jul	Aug	Sep	Oct	Nov	Dec	Year
Daily mean °C (°F)	−1.0 (30.2)	0.6 (33.1)	3.9 (39.0)	8.6 (47.5)	13.3 (55.9)	17.0 (62.6)	19.0 (66.2)	18.9 (66.0)	14.3 (57.7)	9.6 (49.3)	4.8 (40.6)	−0.2 (31.6)	9.1 (48.3)
Average precipitation mm (inches)	63.9 (2.52)	68.9 (2.71)	59.3 (2.33)	76.8 (3.02)	94.9 (3.74)	91.2 (3.59)	87.5 (3.44)	69.6 (2.74)	106.8 (4.20)	94.4 (3.72)	111.4 (4.39)	106.2 (4.18)	1,030.9 (40.58)
Average rainy days	6	7	11	16	15	13	10	11	10	12	10	8	129
Average snowy days	10	9	7	3	0	0	0	0	0	1	4	9	43
Average dew point °C (°F)	−4 (25)	−2 (28)	0 (32)	2 (36)	7 (45)	11 (52)	12 (54)	11 (52)	10 (50)	6 (43)	0 (32)	−2 (28)	4 (40)
Source 1: Climate Charts(temperatures-precipitation 1993-2022)
Source 2: unipage.net(Rain and snow days-dew point)

== History ==
Although there is evidence of some settlement in the region dating back to the Bronze Age, the true history of Travnik begins during the first few centuries AD. Dating from this time there are numerous indications of Roman settlement in the region, including graves, forts, the remains of various other structures, and early Christian basilicas. In the town itself, Roman coins and plaques have been found. Some writing found indicates the settlement is closely connected to the known Roman colony in modern-day Zenica, 30 km (19 mi) away.

In the Middle Ages the Travnik area was known as the župa Lašva, a province of the medieval Bosnian Kingdom. The area is first mentioned by Bela IV of Hungary in 1244. Travnik itself was one of a number of fortified towns in the region, with its fortress Kaštel becoming today's old town sector. The town itself is first mentioned by the Ottomans during their conquest of nearby Jajce.

After the Ottoman conquest of Bosnia in the 15th century, much of the local population converted to Islam as part of the Islamization policy by the Ottoman Empire. The town quickly grew into one of the more important settlements in the region, as the authorities constructed mosques, marketplaces, and various infrastructures. During 1699 when Sarajevo was set afire by the soldiers of Field-Marshal Prince Eugene of Savoy, Travnik became the capital of the Ottoman province of Bosnia and residence of the Bosnian viziers. The town became an important center of government in the entire western frontier of the empire, and consulates were established by the governments of France and Austria-Hungary.

The period of Austrian occupation brought westernization and industry to Travnik, but also a reduction of importance. While cities such as Banja Luka, Sarajevo, Tuzla, and Zenica grew rapidly, Travnik changed so little that during 1991 it had a mere 30,000 or so people, with 70,000 in the entire municipality.

A large fire started by a spark from a locomotive in September 1903 destroyed most of the town's buildings and homes, leaving only some hamlets and the fortress untouched. The cleanup and rebuilding took several years.

From 1922 to 1929, Travnik was the capital of the Travnik Oblast. From 1929 to 1941, Travnik was part of the Drina Banovina of the Kingdom of Yugoslavia.

During the Bosnian War, the town mostly escaped damage from conflict with Serbian forces, hosting refugees from nearby Jajce, but the area experienced fighting between local Bosniak and Croat factions before the Washington Agreement was signed in 1994. After the war, Travnik was made the capital of the Central Bosnia Canton.

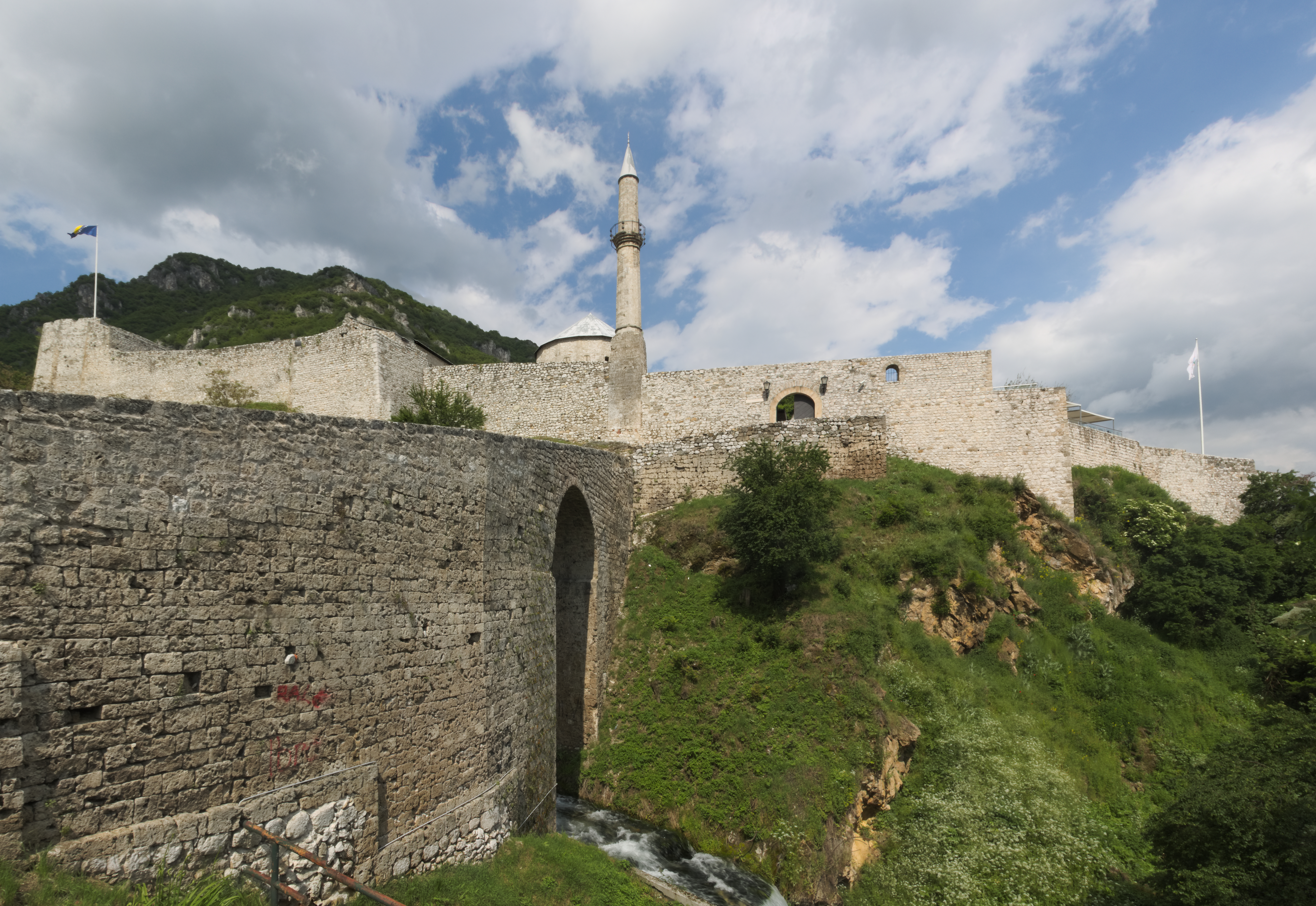
Travnik Fortress

== Administration ==
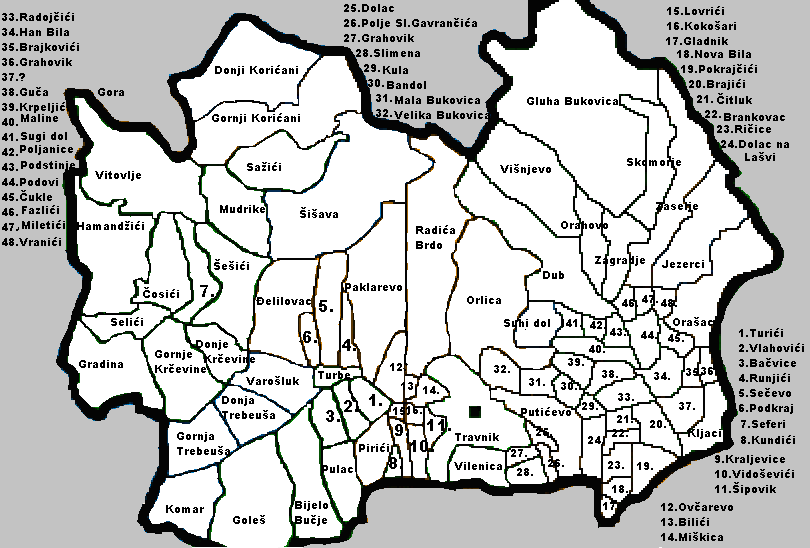
Villages within the Travnik municipality

The Travnik Municipality within the Central Bosnia Canton

Travnik is the administrative centre of the Municipality of Travnik, whose area of jurisdiction covers the town of Travnik itself and 89 other rural settlements. Travnik is also the capital of the Central Bosnia Canton, one of the ten Cantons of Bosnia. The municipal government has various agencies dedicated to the operations of the region, ranging from the bureau of urbanization and construction, to the bureau of refugees and displaced persons.

Party	Number of representatives				Current number of representatives
Party	2000.	2004.	2008.	2012.	Current number of representatives
SDA		14 / 31	15 / 31	11 / 31	
SDP BiH	6 / 25	2 / 25	2 / 25	5 / 25	
HDZ BiH	7 / 31	6 / 31	8 / 31	4 / 31	
SBB BiH				4 / 31	
HDZ 1990			0 / 31	2 / 31	
HSS-NHI	2 / 31	1 / 31	1 / 31	1 / 31	
HSS SR				1 / 31	
LDS BiH		1 / 31	0 / 31	1 / 31	

== Economy ==
The economy of the Travnik region suffered greatly during the war period of the early 1990s. In 1981 Travnik's GDP per capita was 63% of the Yugoslav average.

Nowadays, most of the region deals with typical rural work such as farming and herding. As for the urban industry, Travnik has several factories producing everything from matches to furniture. Food processing is also a strong industry in the region, especially meat and milk companies.

== Tourism ==
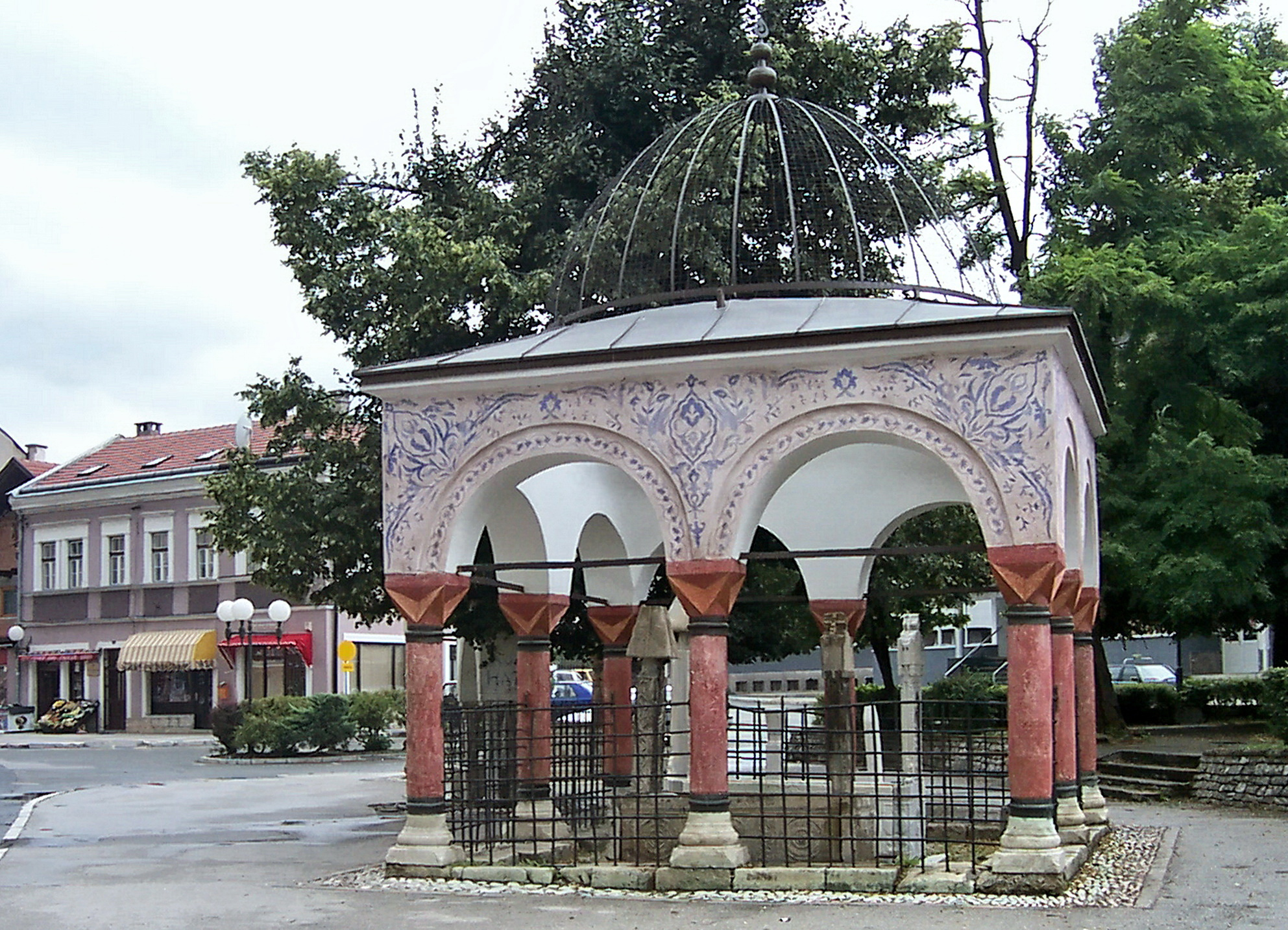
A vizier's grave (turbe) in Travnik.

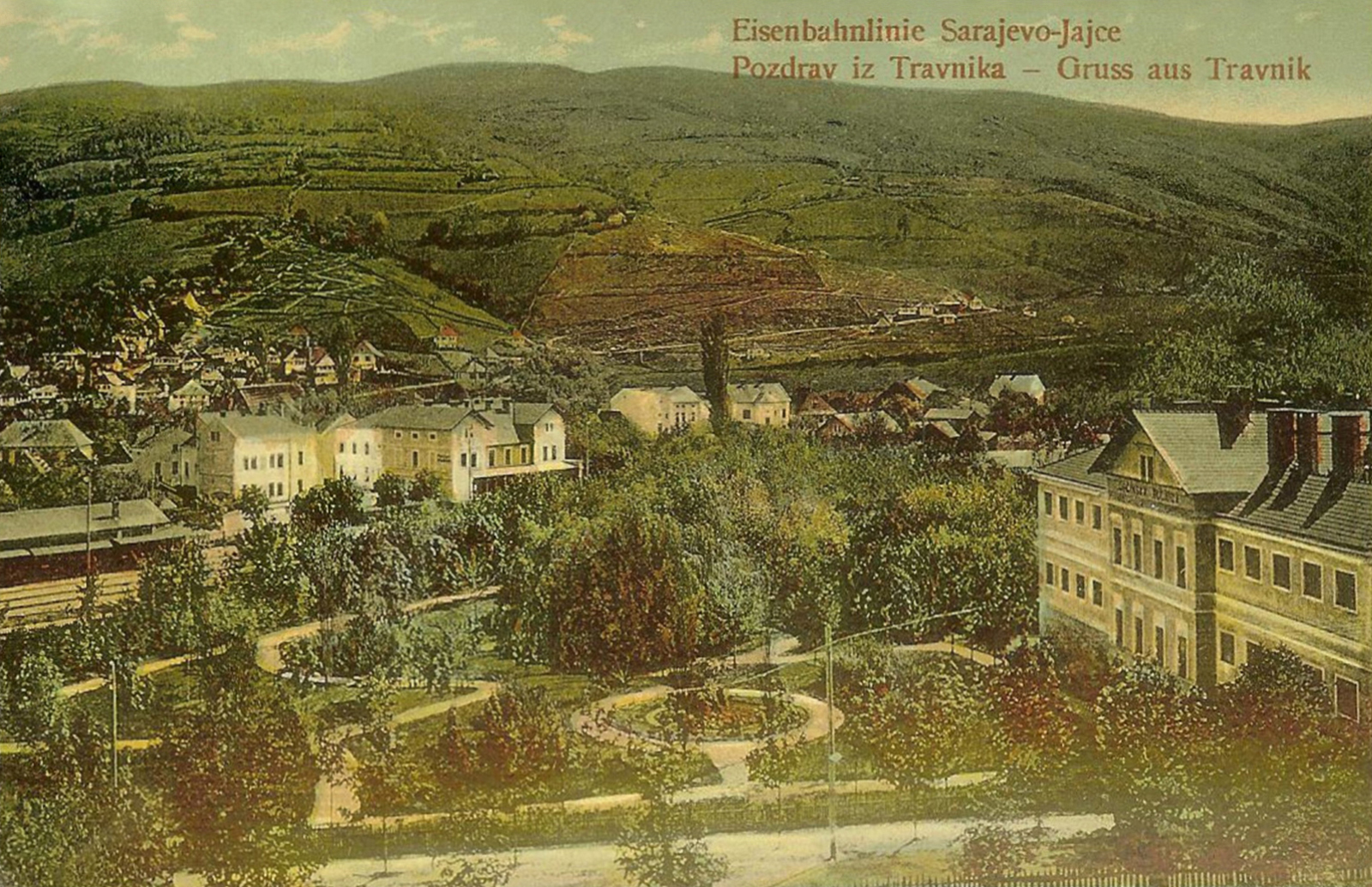
A 1910 postcard of the now abandoned Travnik railway station during the Austro-Hungarian rule (circa 1910)

Like many Bosnian towns, Travnik's tourism is based largely on its history and geography. Nearby Mount Vlašić is one of the tallest peaks in Bosnia and Herzegovina, and a popular spot for skiing, hiking and sledding.

Numerous structures dating to the Ottoman era have survived in near perfect condition, such as numerous mosques, oriental homes, two clock towers (sahat kula; Travnik is the only town in Bosnia and Herzegovina to have two clock towers) and fountains. The old town dates back to the early 15th century, making it one of the most popular and widely accessible sites from that time.

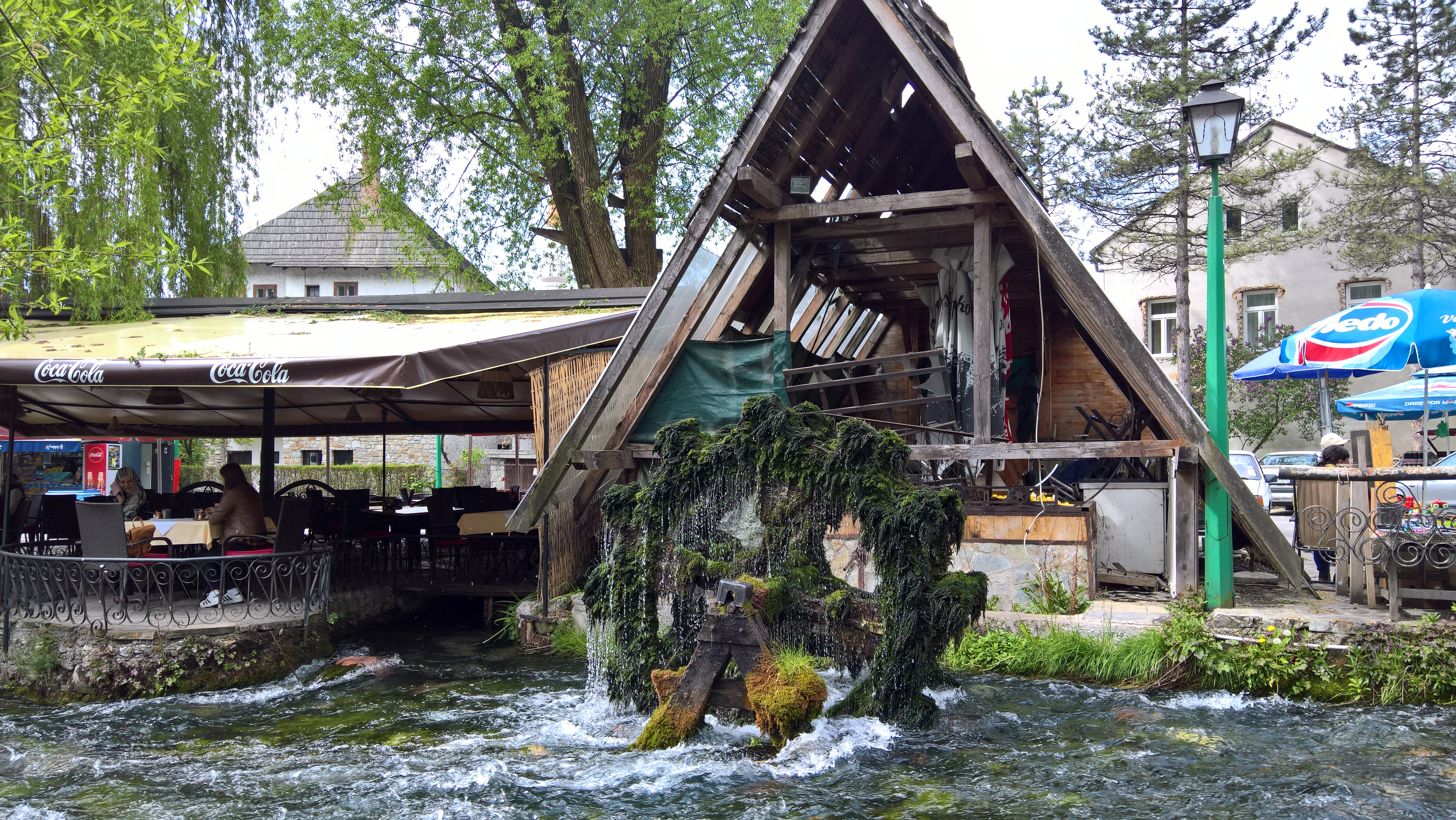
An old watermill by Plava voda

== Demographics ==
=== Population ===
Population of settlements – Travnik municipality
	Settlement	1971	1981	1991	2013
	Total	55,822	64,100	70,747	53,482
1	Bačvice			747	574
2	Bijelo Bučje			924	707
3	Bilići			335	287
4	Brajići			625	628
5	Brajkovići			521	394
6	Brankovac			298	255
7	Čosići			683	433
8	Čukle			1,348	524
9	Đelilovac			1,229	777
10	Dolac			700	480
11	Dolac na Lašvi			504	456
12	Donje Krčevine			497	317
13	Dub			962	988
14	Gladnik			330	332
15	Gluha Bukovica			1,041	878
16	Goleš			1,081	425
17	Gornje Krčevine			759	576
18	Gradina			609	383
19	Grahovčići			1,215	403
20	Grahovik			342	277
21	Guča Gora			847	511
22	Hamandžići			501	256
23	Han Bila			682	655
24	Jezerci			643	338
25	Kljaci			739	634
26	Krpeljići			722	629
27	Kula			450	528
28	Maline			1,483	1,095
29	Mosor			319	265
30	Mudrike			748	550
31	Nova Bila			770	692
32	Orahovo			399	328
33	Ovčarevo			564	496
34	Paklarevo			1,258	975
35	Podkraj			462	507
36	Podovi			1,039	1,076
37	Podstinje			722	538
38	Pokrajčići			1,378	1,540
39	Poljanice			296	250
40	Polje Slavka Gavrančića			415	344
41	Pulac			498	417
42	Putićevo			1,523	1,193
43	Radića Brdo			315	230
44	Radojčići			293	312
45	Ričice			653	584
46	Seferi			527	417
47	Selići			448	302
48	Šipovik			352	202
49	Slimena			934	1,231
50	Suhi Dol			576	482
51	Travnik	12,977	15,888	19,041	16,534
52	Turbe			4,549	3,890
53	Turići			795	650
54	Varošluk			736	693
55	Višnjevo			967	958
56	Vitovlje			708	576
57	Vlahovići			344	309
58	Zagrađe			631	447

=== Ethnic composition ===
Ethnic composition – Travnik town
	2013	1991	1981	1971
Total	15,344 (100,0%)	19,041 (100,0%)	15,888 (100,0%)	12,977 (100,0%)
Bosniaks	10,899 (71,03%)	7,373 (38,72%)	5,822 (36,64%)	5,730 (44,16%)
Croats	2,847 (18,55%)	6,043 (31,74%)	5,026 (31,63%)	4,538 (34,97%)
Others	1,276 (8,316%)	694 (3,645%)	89 (0,560%)	122 (0,940%)
Serbs	322 (2,09%)	2,131 (11,19%)	1,901 (11,97%)	1,894 (14,60%)
Yugoslavs		2,800 (14,71%)	2 867 (18,05%)	486 (3,745%)
Montenegrins			89 (0,560%)	102 (0,786%)
Albanians			48 (0,302%)	30 (0,231%)
Slovenes			30 (0,189%)	44 (0,339%)
Macedonians			9 (0,057%)	21 (0,162%)
Hungarians			7 (0,044%)	10 (0,077%)

Ethnic composition – Travnik municipality
	2013	1991	1981	1971
Total	53,482 (100,0%)	70,747 (100,0%)	64,100 (100,0%)	55,822 (100,0%)
Bosniaks	35,648 (66,65%)	31,813 (44,97%)	27,691 (43,20%)	24,480 (43,85%)
Croats	15,102 (28,24%)	26,118 (36,92%)	24,411 (38,08%)	22,645 (40,57%)
Others	2,092 (3,912%)	1,296 (1,832%)	325 (0,507%)	246 (0,441%)
Serbs	640 (1,197%)	7,777 (10,99%)	7,487 (11,68%)	7,554 (13,53%)
Yugoslavs		3,743 (5,291%)	3,920 (6,115%)	626 (1,121%)
Montenegrins			126 (0,197%)	133 (0,238%)
Albanians			63 (0,098%)	36 (0,064%)
Slovenes			32 (0,050%)	49 (0,088%)
Macedonians			22 (0,034%)	25 (0,045%)
Roma			16 (0,025%)	18 (0,032%)
Hungarians			7 (0,011%)	10 (0,018%)

== Culture ==
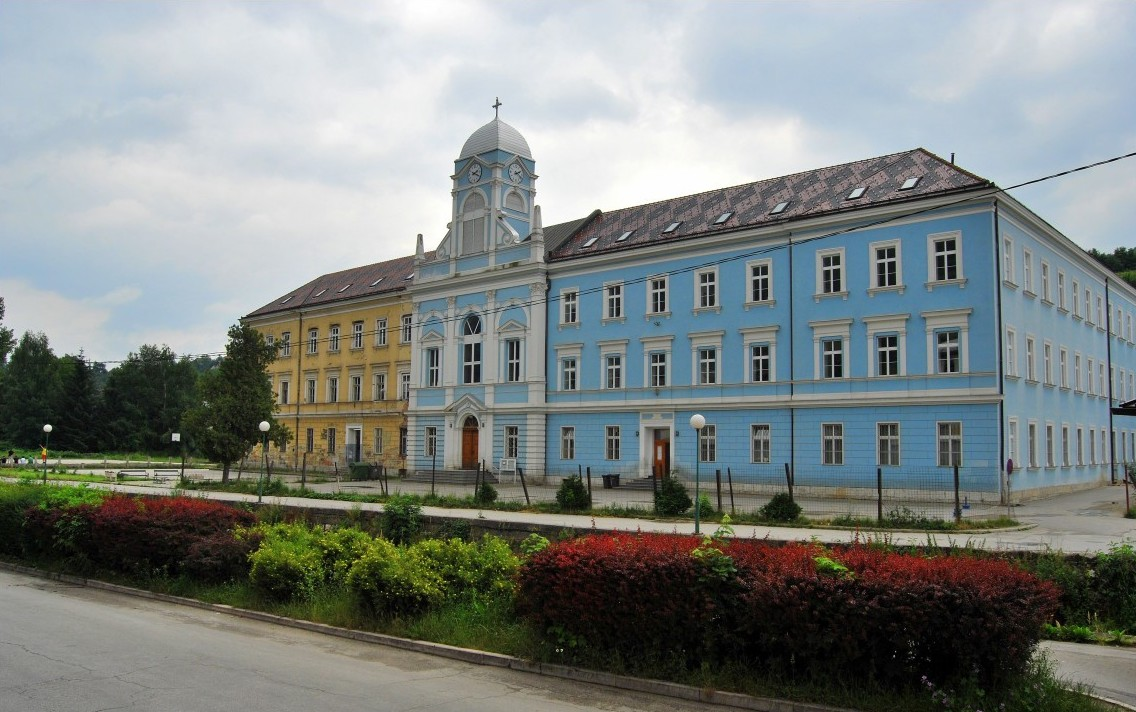
Travnik's gymnasium is a classic example of the "Two schools under one roof" system. The right side of the building hosts the Croatian-curriculum high school and was renovated with funds from the Republic of Croatia. The left side of the building hosts the Bosnian-curriculum high school and is dilapidated. The courtyard is separated by a fence.

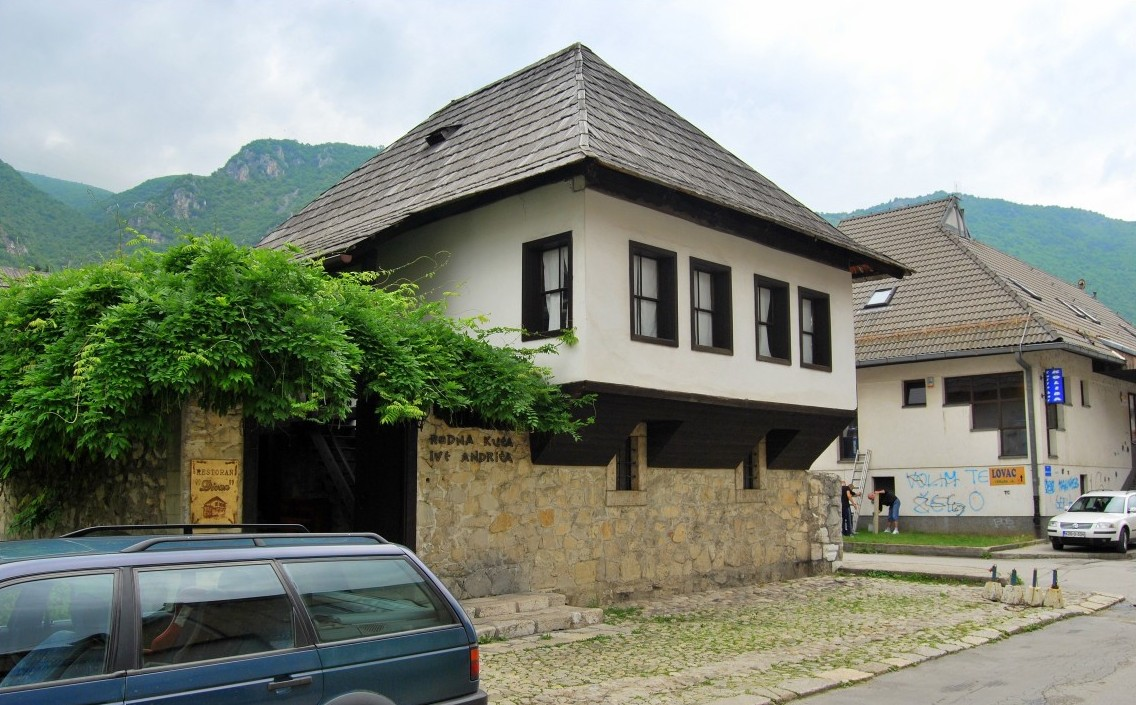
The birthplace of Ivo Andrić

Travnik has a strong culture, mostly dating back to its time as the center of the local government in the Ottoman Empire. Travnik has a popular old town district, which dates back to the period of Bosnian independence during the first half of the 15th century. Numerous mosques and churches exist in the region, as do tombs of important historical figures and excellent examples of Ottoman architecture. The town museum, built in 1950, is one of the most impressive cultural institutions in the region.

One of the main works of Ivo Andrić, a native of Travnik, is the Travnik Chronicle (or the Bosnian Chronicle), depicting life in Travnik during the Napoleonic Wars and written during World War II.

The Bosnian Tornjak, one of Bosnia's two major dog breeds and a national symbol, originated in the area, and can be found around the Vlašić mountain.

=== Sports ===
The local football team is NK Travnik, founded in 1922.

== Notable people ==
- Ivo Andrić, writer and the 1961 winner of the Nobel Prize in Literature
- Derviš Korkut, scholar
- Miroslav Ćiro Blažević, professional football manager and player
- Muharem Bazdulj, novelist and journalist.
- Nura Bazdulj-Hubijar, poet and novelist.
- Brothers Josip and Zlatko Pejaković, artists, actors, and musicians
- Davor Džalto, artist, art historian, theologian, and philosopher
- Nikša Bratoš, composer and arranger of contemporary music
- Vjekoslav Kramer, chef
- Sena Jurinac, operatic soprano
- Solomon Gaon, Sephardic Rabbi and Hakham
- Mirosław Ferić, fighter pilot
- Nikola Mandić, politician
- Zlata Bartl, scientist and is the creator of Vegeta
- Frano Zubić, Bosnian Franciscan
- Larisa Cerić, judoka
- Mladen Solomun, DJ and music producer
- Vildana Selimbegović, journalist

== Twin towns – sister cities ==
Travnik is twinned with:

- İzmit, Turkey
- Karpoš, North Macedonia
- Kırıkkale, Turkey
- Leipzig, Germany
- Makarska, Croatia
- Pendik, Turkey
- Police nad Metují, Czech Republic
- Yalova, Turkey

== Gallery ==
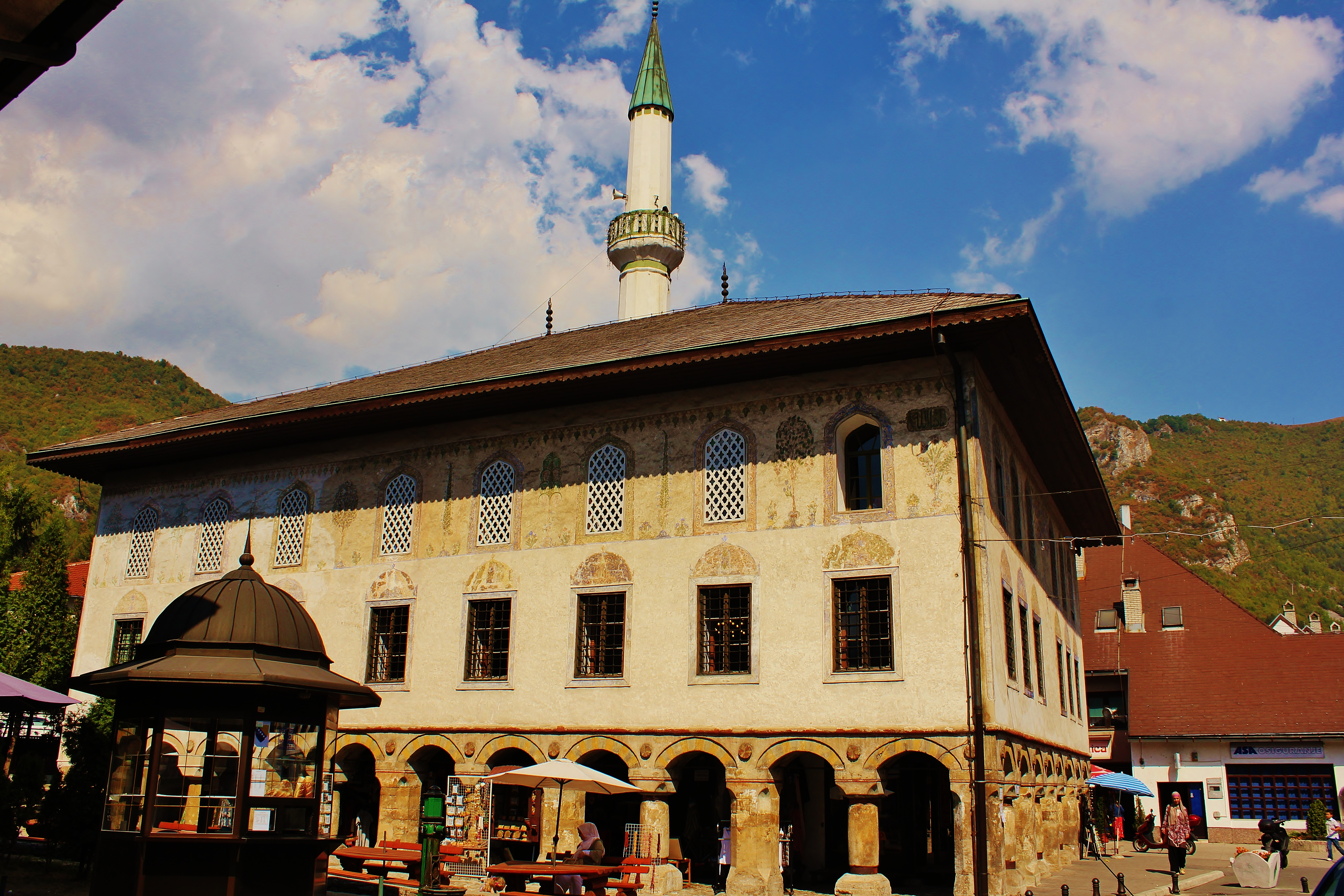
Sulejmanija Mosque

Sulejmanija Mosque

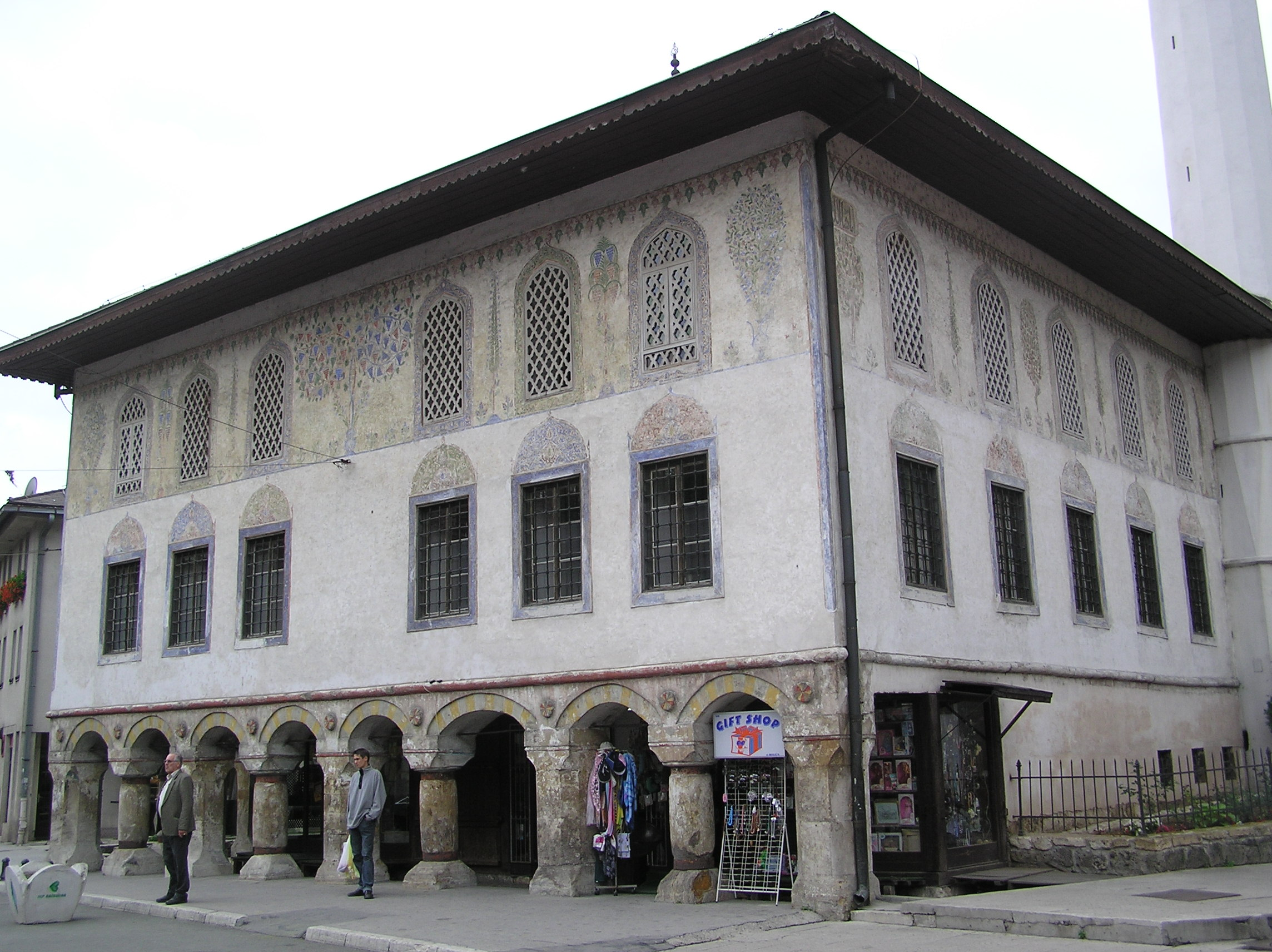
Sulejmanija Mosque

Sulejmanija Mosque

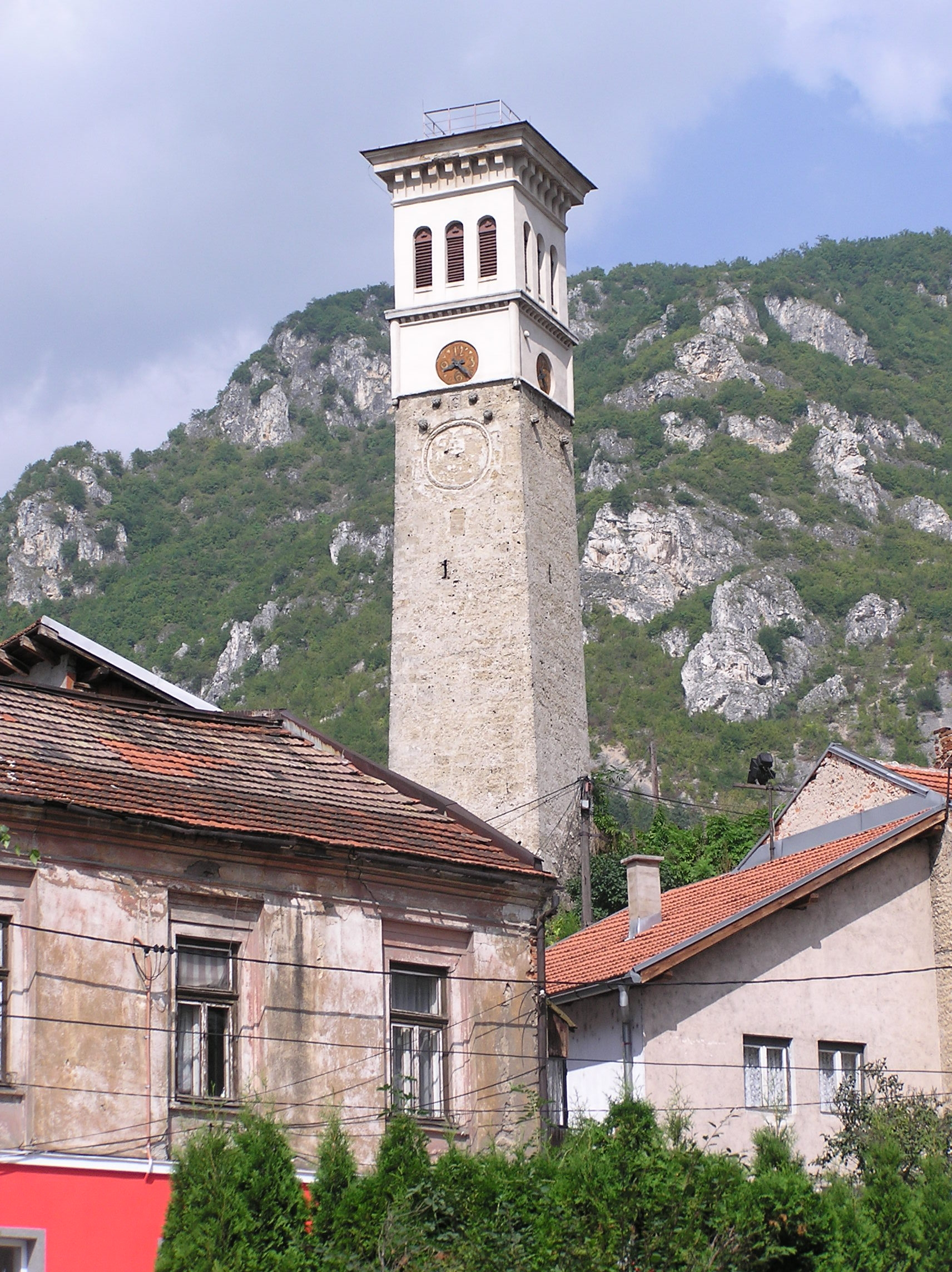
Sahat Kula, Clock Tower

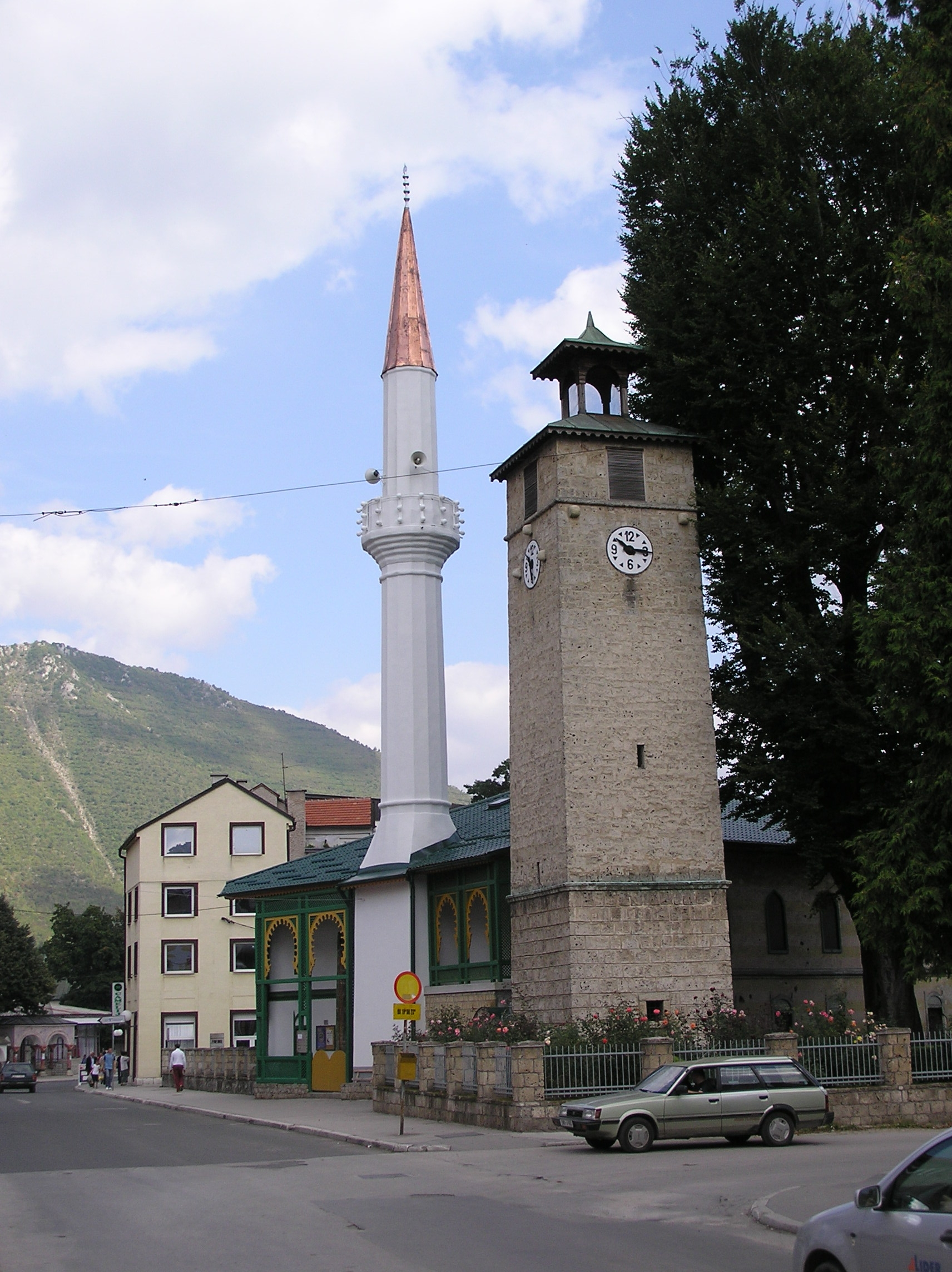
Another Clock Tower

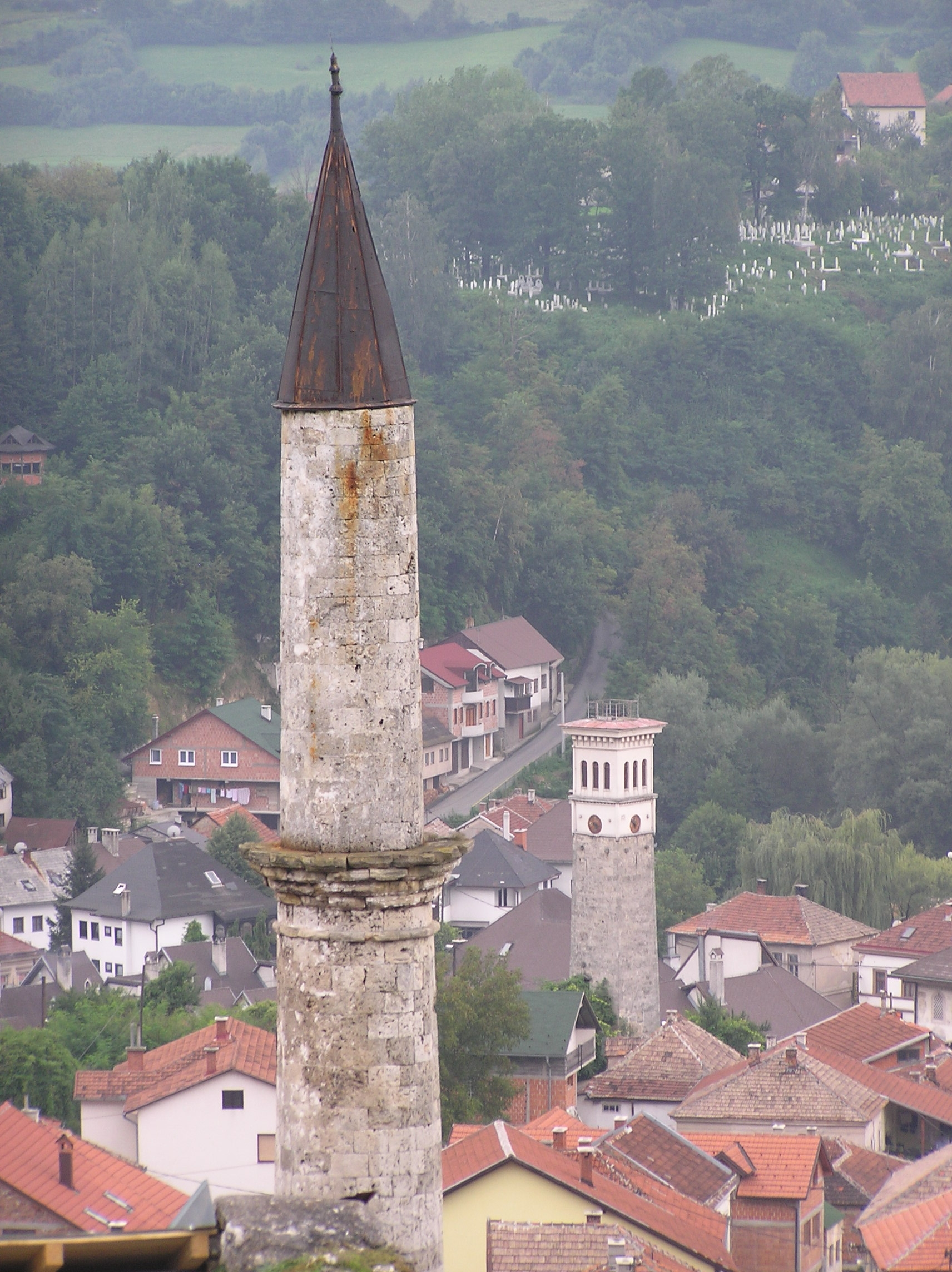
View from Travnik Castle

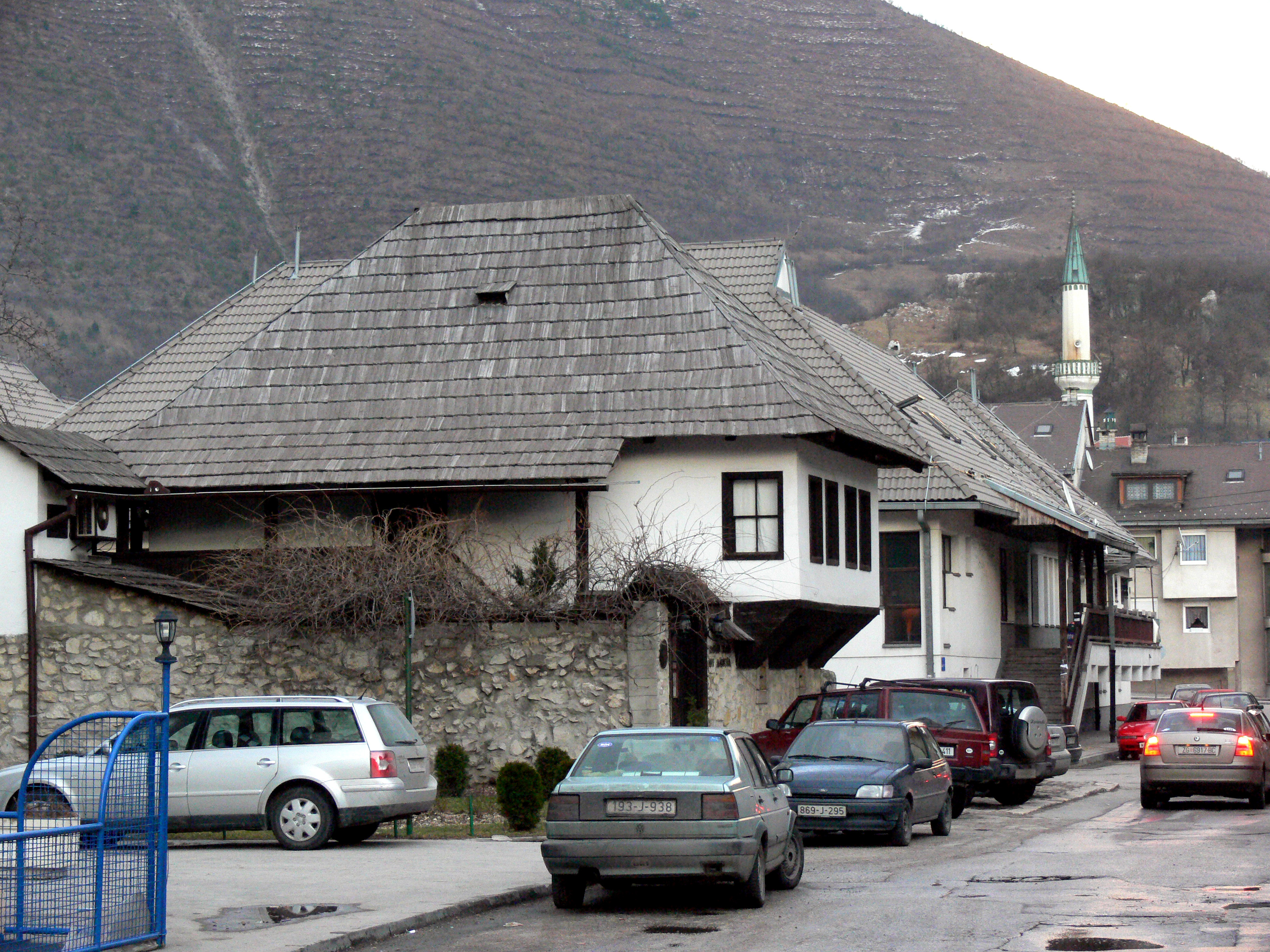
Birthplace (home) of Ivo Andrić

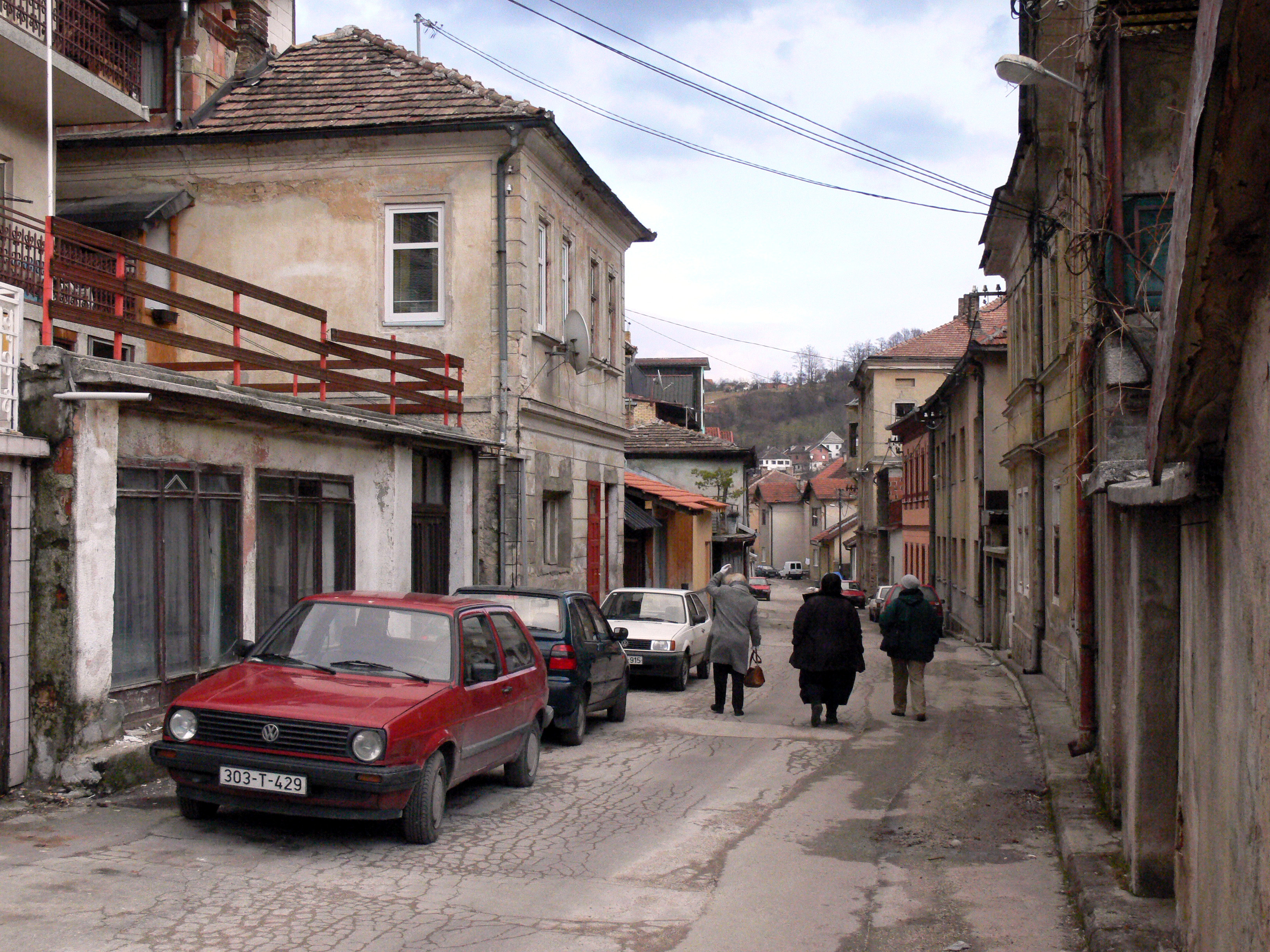
Poturmahala

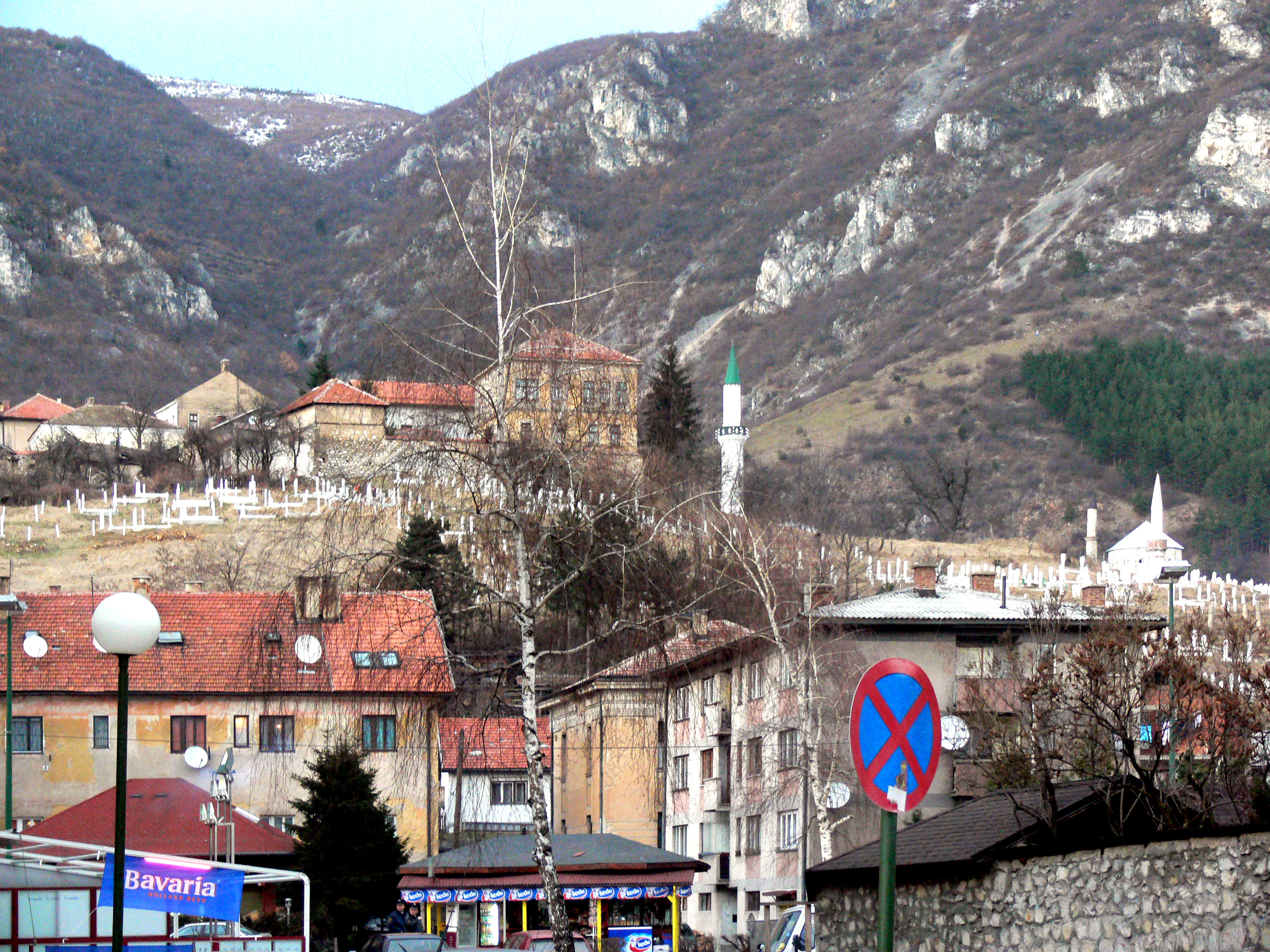
Old Town

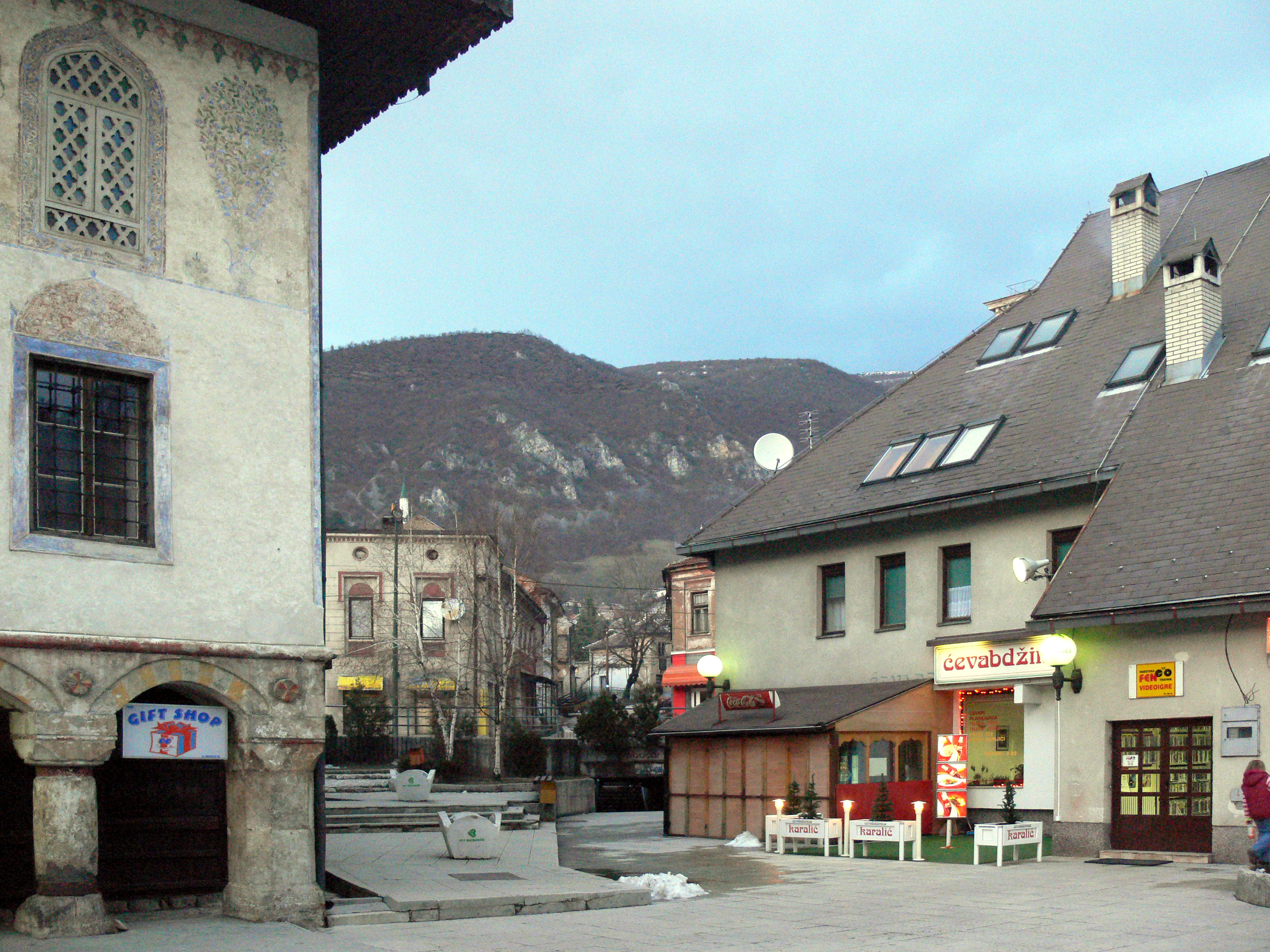

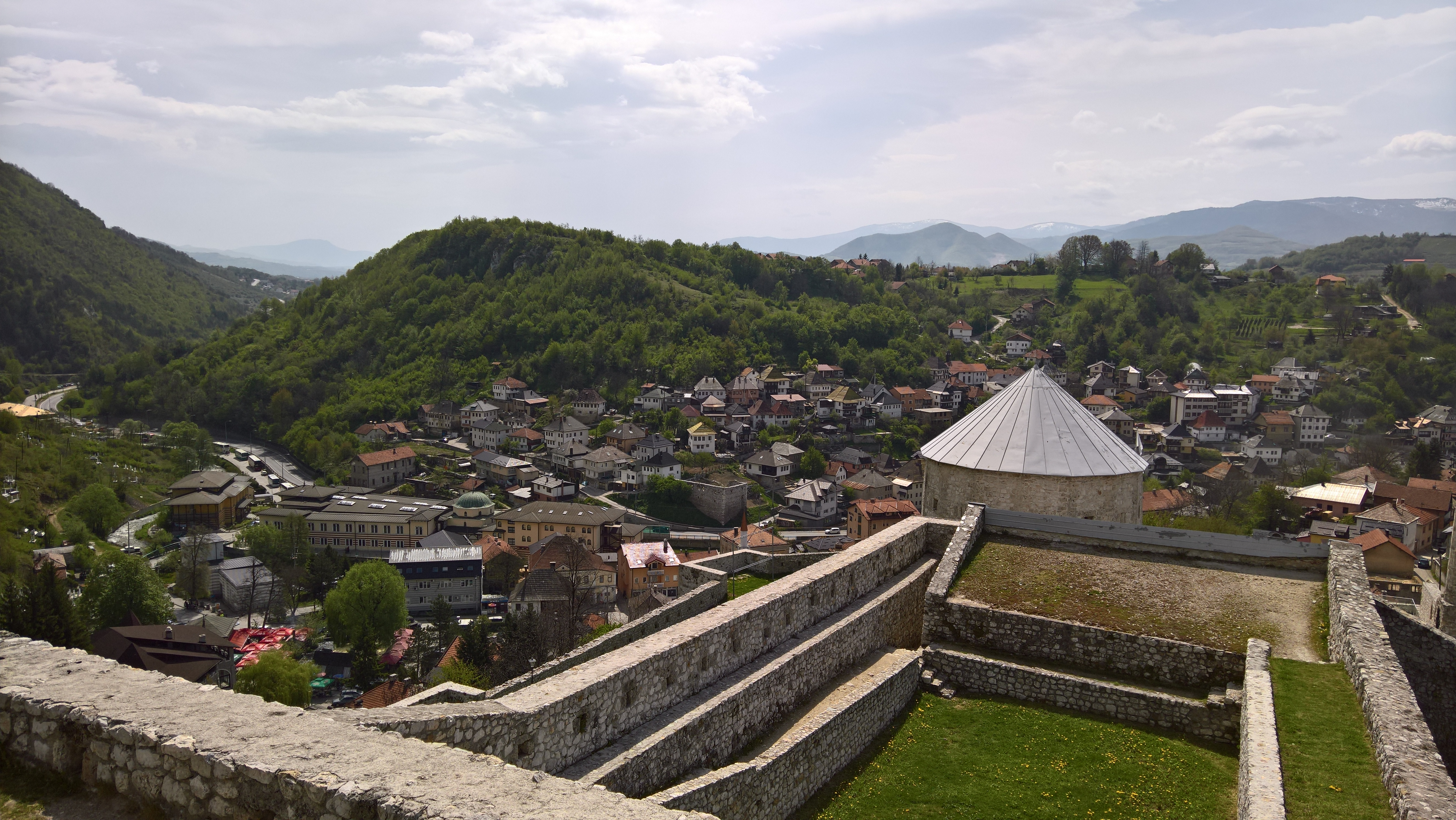
Entry to Travnik from the eastern side

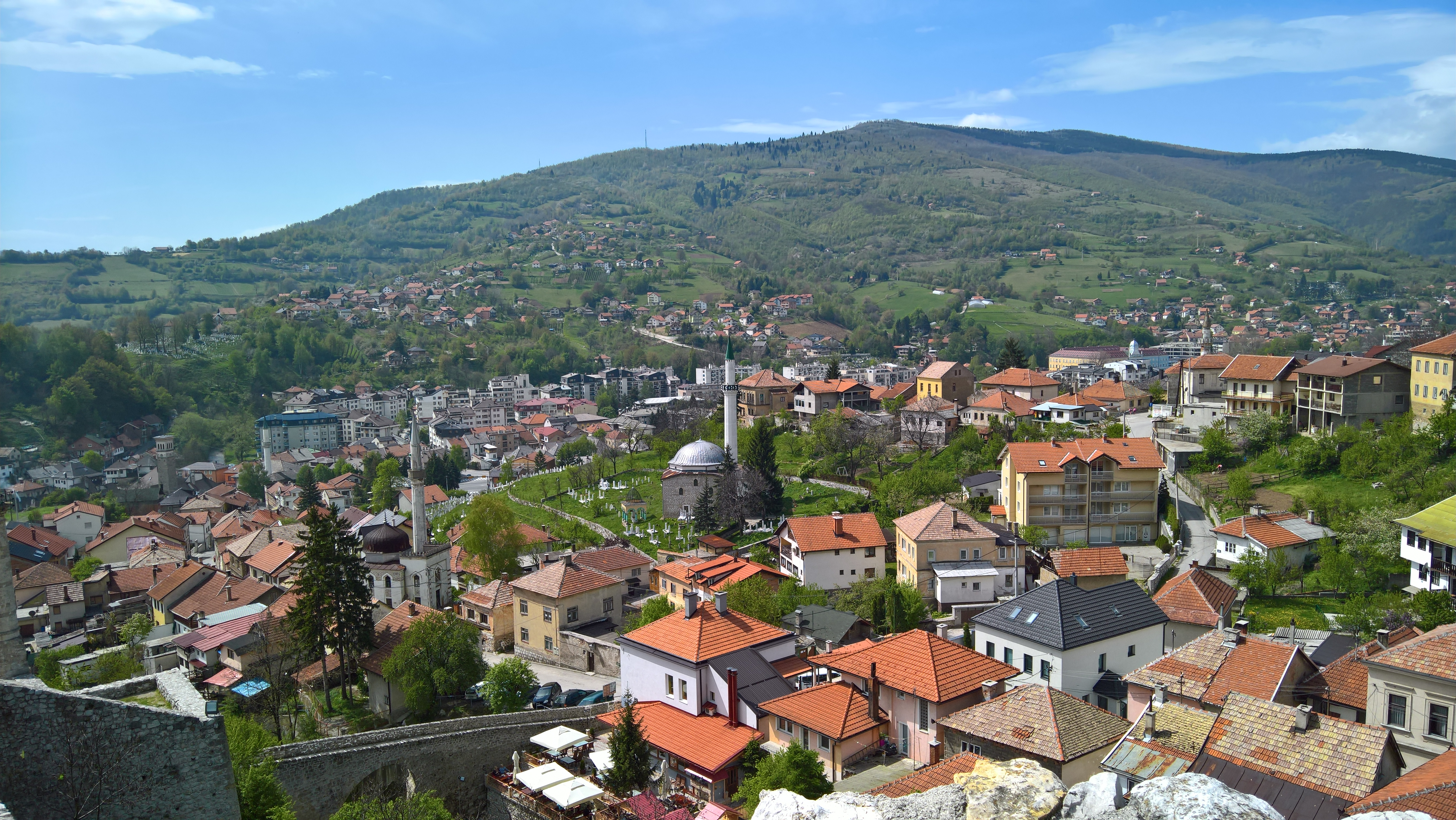
Travnik downtown from castle
