= Biana Kovic =

Biana Kovic (also Biana Cvetkovic) is a professional cellist and educator, specialized in teaching adolescents and adults to play the cello. Kovic's film company is Fullmoon Productions. In 2006, Kovic created a documentary film about Matty Kahn who learned to play a cello at age 89. Kovic is a founder of It's Never 2 Late, Inc., based in NY.

== Filmography ==
- 2007 Virtuoso - short documentary. Director, producer, editor, and as herself.
