= Miloš Ković =

Serbian historian

- Милош Ковић
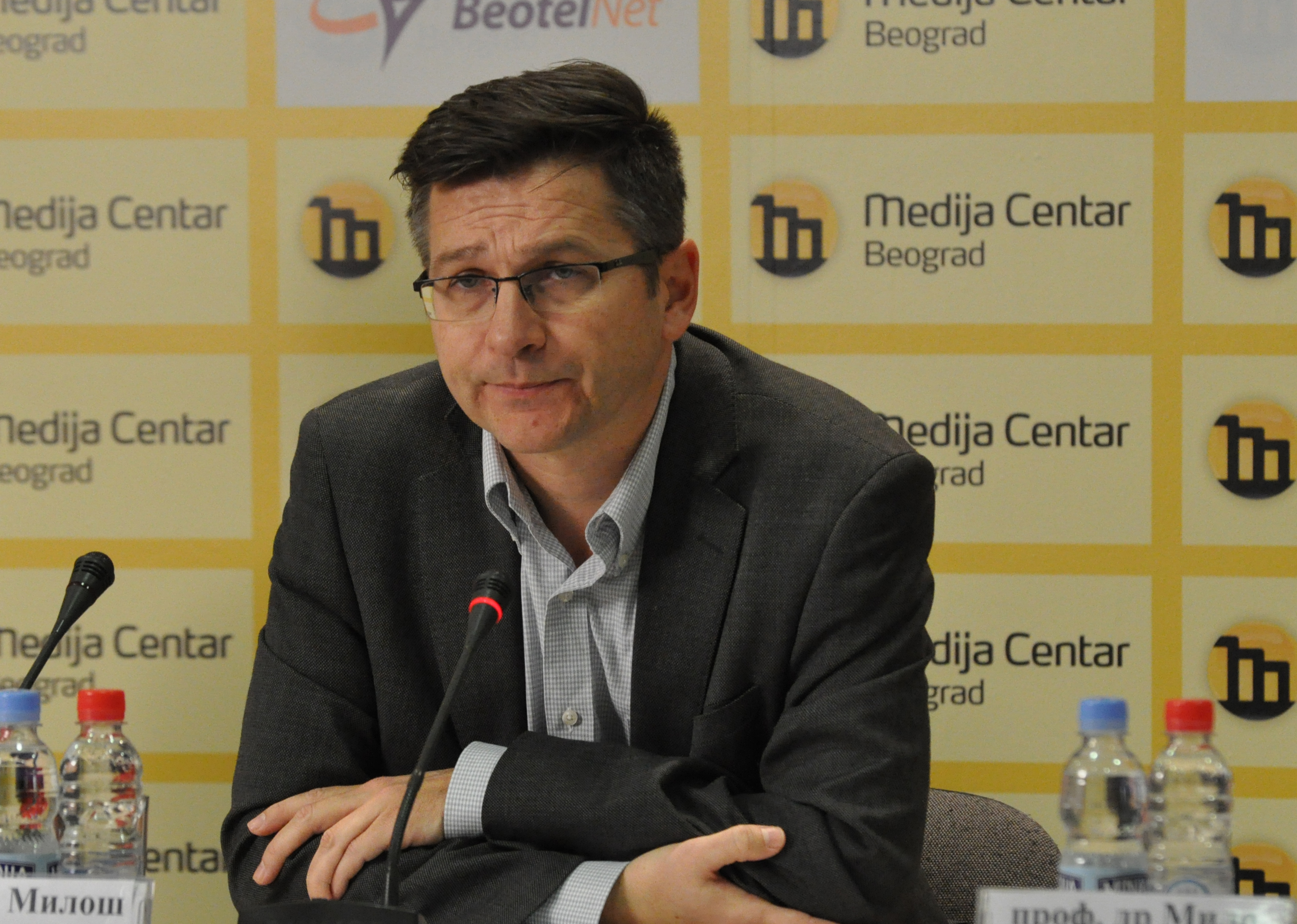
- Ković in 2018
- Born: 13 May 1969 (age 57); Šabac, SFR Yugoslavia
- Known for: Disraeli and the Eastern Question; Srbi 1903-1914: Istorija ideja
- Awards: Ilarion Ruvarac Award
- Scientific career
- Fields: History
- Workplaces: University of Belgrade

Miloš Ković (Serbian Cyrillic: Милош Ковић; born 13 May 1969) is a Serbian historian and university professor at Faculty of Philosophy, University of Belgrade.

== Biography ==
Ković spent one year of his postgraduate studies at University of Oxford. In 2015 Ković won the Ilarion Ruvarac award of the Matica Srpska.

Aside from his work at University of Belgrade, Ković taught at University of Banja Luka and a number of societies and organisation in Serbia and the region.

During the trial of Ratko Mladić, Ković appeared as witness of defence at the ICTY. According to Ković, ICTY's main task is not to condemn criminals, but to "rewrite Serbian history" and "to imprint a mark of collective guilt on Serbs."

Areas of his research are International Relations (late 18th to early 20th century) and History of Political Ideas (late 18th to early 20th century).

== Views ==
In March 2022, Ković was returned from the border by the Bosnian authorities on his way to a lecture in East Sarajevo, based on the assessment that he was a "threat to the security of BiH." Soume sources have claimed that Ković advocates strengthening of the Russian and Chinese influence in the Balkans and promotes anti-Western and anti-NATO rhetoric.

In April 2022, Ković signed a petition calling for Serbia not to impose sanctions on Russia after it invaded Ukraine.

== Works ==
Books

- Ković, Miloš. Disraeli and the Eastern Question. Oxford: Oxford University Press, 2011. XX, 339 pp., Ill. ISBN 978-0-19-957460-5 [COBISS.SR-ID 520123543]
- Ković, Miloš. Dizraeli i istočno pitanje. Belgrade: Clio, 2007. 509 pages, illustrations. ISBN 978-86-7102-284-2 [COBISS.SR-ID 144919052]
- Ković, Miloš. (2015). Srbi 1903-1914: Istorija ideja. Clio. ISBN 978-86-7102-499-0.
- Jedini put: sile Antante i odbrana Srbije 1915. godine. Belgrade, Filip Višnjić, 2016
- Uporišta. Belgrade: Catena Mundi, 2016
- Pravo Na Istoriju, co-author with Drago Mastilović. Belgrade: Catena Mundi, 2018
- Zaveti, Belgrade: Catena Mundi, 2019
- Velike sile i Srbi 1496–1833 – Miloš Ković. Belgrade: Catena Mundi, 2021
- Četiri Revolucije: Evropa i svet 1774-1799. Belgrade: Filip Višnjić, 2021
- Istorija i predanje. Belgrade: Catena Mundi, 2023

Editor

- Srbi 1903-1914: Istorija ideja, Clio, 2015
- Gavrilo Princip – dokumenti i sećanja, 2014

Selected articles

- Ković, Miloš. Jovan Skerlić's political ideas: a view from 2014. Letopis Matice srpske, ISSN 0025-5939, okt. 2014, vol. 494, vol. 4, pp. 465–472. [COBISS.SR-ID 290550279]
- Ković, Miloš. Imagining the Serbs: revisionism in the recent historiography of nineteenth-sentury Serbian history. Balcanica, ISSN 0350-7653, 2012, vol. 43, pp. 325–346. [COBISS.SR-ID 522464663]
- Ković, Miloš. The Beginning of the 1875 Serbian Uprising in Herzegovina: the British Perspective. Balcanica, ISSN 0350-7653, 2010, vol. \ 41, pp. 55–71. [COBISS.SR-ID 520562583]
- Ković, Miloš. Robert Lloyd-Lynch's mission in Serbia in 1876. Historical Journal, ISSN 0350-0802, 2011, vol. 60, pp. 377–391. [COBISS.SR-ID 521065367]
- Ković, Miloš. The British and Haxhi-Loja's Revolution: Consul Edward Freeman on the 1878 Uprising and Occupation of Sarajevo. Mixed materials, ISSN 0350-5650, 2011, vol. 32, pp. 381–414. [COBISS.SR-ID 521064855]
- Ković, Miloš. A contribution to the history of the Serbian left: romanticism and patriotism of Jovan Skerlić. Law & Society, ISSN 1821-4118, 2011. 3, no. 3/4, pp. 85–98. [COBISS.SR-ID 189029132]
- Ković, Miloš. Knowledge or intention: contemporary world historiography on Serbs in the 19th century. Sociology, ISSN 0038-0318, 2011, 53, 4, pp. 401–416. [COBISS.SR-ID 521619351]
- Ković, Miloš. Great Britain and Bosnia and Herzegovina in the Eastern Crisis: (1875-1878). Zbornik za istoriju Bosne i Hercegovine, ISSN 0354-9461, 2009, 6, pp. 159–173. [COBISS.SR-ID 521595543]
- Ković, Miloš. The press as a source of knowledge and as a political tool: party papers of the Kingdom of Serbia on Raška (1903-1907). Mileševski zapisi, ISSN 0354-6926, 1996, no. 2, pp. 257–274. [COBISS.SR-ID 51711170]
