= Travnik Castle =

Medieval fortress in Bosnia and Herzegovina

- Travnik, Central Bosnia Canton in Bosnia and Herzegovina
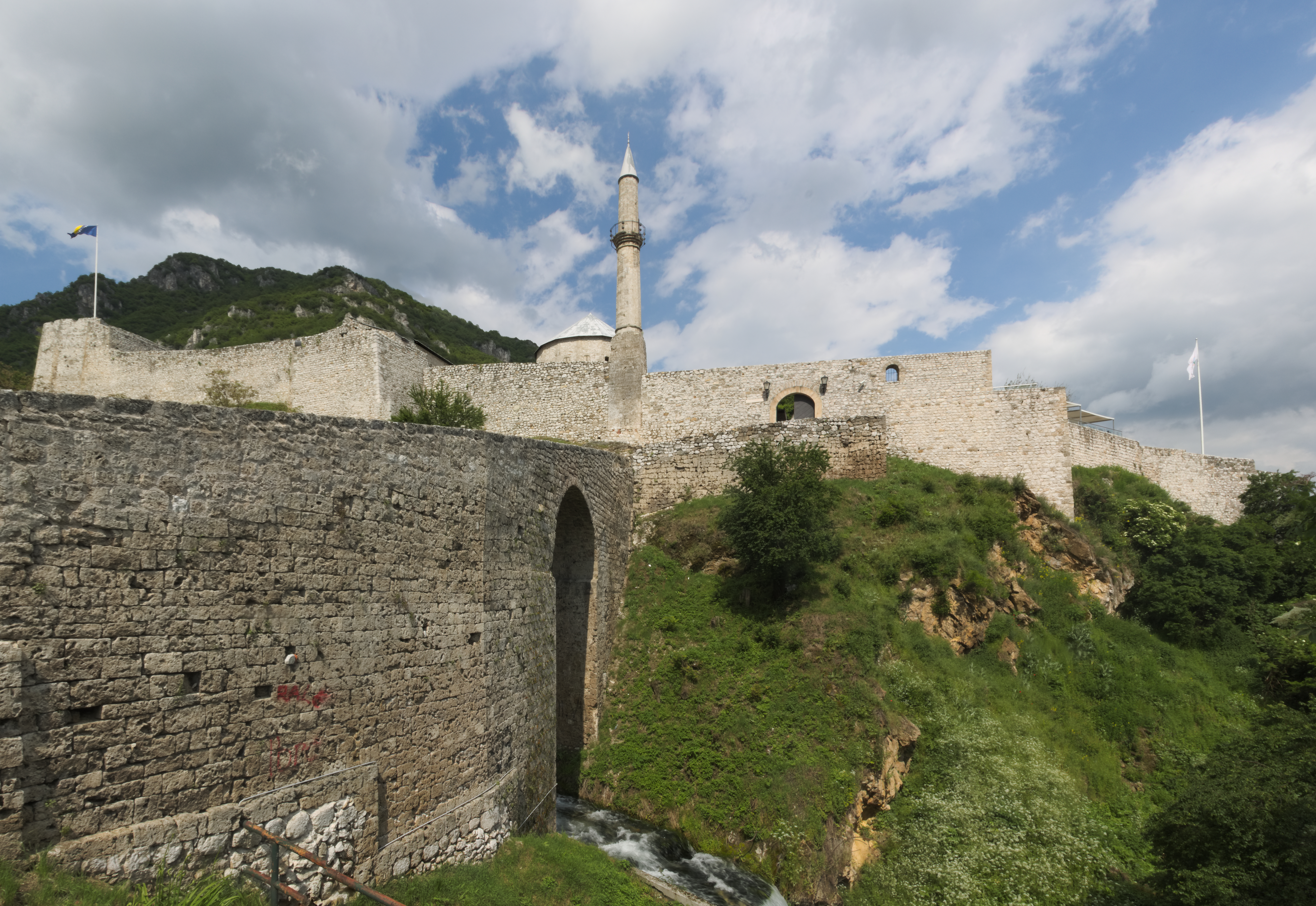
- Travnik Fortress

Site information
- Type: Castle
- Owner: The Government of Bosnia and Herzegovina
- Controlled by: Regional Museum of Travnik
- Condition: Preserved

Location
- Coordinates: 44.1335°N 17.3935°E

Site history
- Built: 15th century
- Built by: (unknown) possibly King Tvrtko II, Batalo of Lašva or King Ostoja
- In use: Until 1918
- Materials: hewn stone (ashlar)
- Battles/wars: Siege of Jajce (1463)

Garrison information
- Designations

KONS of Bosnia and Herzegovina
- Official name: Old Travnik fortress, the architectural ensemble
- Type: Category II cultural and historical property
- Criteria: A, B, C i.iii.iv., D ii.iv., E v., F ii.iii., G v.vii, I iii.iv.
- Designated: 25 January 2005 (?th session)
- Reference no.: 2529
- Decision no.: 05.2-2-268/04-6
- State: National Monuments of Bosnia and Herzegovina

Travnik Castle, locally known as Stari Grad Castle (old town castle), is a medieval town-fortress complex in the town of Travnik, Central Bosnia Canton, Bosnia and Herzegovina.

== Location ==
The fortress is located in the Plava Voda neighbourhood of the town, overlooking the northbound side E661.

== History ==
Dating back to pre-Ottoman Bosnia when the former Christian Kingdom ruled the region, there is no historical data as to the construction date of the Medieval fortress. However, the construction type and other characteristics indicate that it was built sometime in the second half of the 14th century or in the first half of the 15th century. As a result, It was probably built during the time of the Bosnian Kings Tvrtko II or Ostoja, and then rebuilt and expanded during the time of Stephen Thomas. The Travnik fortress was erected before the arrival of the Ottoman Turks for the purpose of defence as the Ottomans penetrated deeper into Bosnia. Travnik itself was one of a number of fortified towns in the region built for this purpose but was built too late to stem the Ottoman advance.

In 1462 King Stephen Tomašević was accepted as a vassal of Hungary and thereafter refused to pay tribute to the Porte. As a consequence, both Ottoman and Christian sides began war preparations. Sultan Mehmed II gathered an army of 150,000 soldiers in Adrianopolis and departed for the Lower Danube area in April 1463. As a part of a diversion attack, he commanded Ali Bey Mihaloğlu to invade southern lands of the Kingdom of Hungary. The Bey crossed into Syrmia, but was pushed back by Andrew Pongrácz, Master of the cupbearers. He then made a flanking move to the heart of Hungary until he reached Temesvár, where he encountered John Pongrác Voivode of Transylvania and was defeated in a fierce battle. Meanwhile, Mehmet II had advanced on Travnik, which he besieged and took. That year the Bosnian Kingdom fell to the Ottomans.

From 1463, until 1878, Travnik was under Ottoman rule, becoming part of the Sanjak of Bosnia. The conquering Ottomans saw the significance this strategic location represented for the military, later developing and expanding the castle, transforming it into a fortress with watchtowers. Today's walls represent that result.

In 1878, Travnik (as with the rest of Bosnia) came under Austro-Hungarian control. During the period of the First World War, Travnik was behind the front lines and the fortress saw no action; however military activities were carried out within its walls. The town was a military garrison of the Austro-Hungarian army as Travnik was in central Bosnia and very well connected by rail. The old train was used for the transportation of soldiers, officers and wounded soldiers, while military equipment, weapons, and ammunition were brought in and distributed.

== Protection and management ==
Today, the castle is one of the best preserved in Bosnia. It has a small museum dedicated to its history and an ethnographic section inside. The Old Fortress of Travnik is inscribed by KONS into a register of the National Monuments of Bosnia and Herzegovina on 25 January 2005.
