= List of Belgian Athletics Championships winners =

The Belgian Athletics Championships (Dutch: Belgische kampioenschappen atletiek; French: Championnats de Belgique d'athlétisme) is an annual outdoor track and field competition organised by the Royal Belgian Athletics League, which serves as the national championship for the sport in Belgium. It was first held in 1889 and introduced events for women in 1921. The competition was not held in the years from 1915 to 1918 due to World War I and also did not take place in 1940 and 1944 due to World War II. While most of the winners have been Belgian nationals, a small number of invited foreign athletes have won at the event.

== Men ==
=== 100 metres ===
- 1960: Paul Robijns
- 1961: Frank Roos
- 1962: Édouard Leroy
- 1963: Paul Poels
- 1964: Paul Poels
- 1965: Ignace Van der Cam
- 1966: Paul Poels
- 1967: Paul Poels
- 1968: Bernard Rossignol
- 1969: Paul Poels
- 1970: Paul Poels
- 1971: Jean-Pierre Borlée
- 1972: Mario Demarchi
- 1973: Guy Stas
- 1974: Lambert Micha
- 1975: Fons Brydenbach
- 1976: Frank Verhelst
- 1977: Lambert Micha
- 1978: Ronald Desruelles
- 1979: Ronald Desruelles
- 1980: Frank Verhelst
- 1981: Jacques Borlée
- 1982: Ronald Desruelles
- 1983: Jacques Borlée
- 1984: Ronald Desruelles
- 1985: Ronald Desruelles
- 1986: Ronald Desruelles
- 1987: Ronald Desruelles
- 1988: Patrick Stevens
- 1989: Patrick Stevens
- 1990: Patrick Stevens
- 1991: Patrick Stevens
- 1992: Patrick Stevens
- 1993: Patrick Stevens
- 1994: Patrick Stevens
- 1995: Patrick Stevens
- 1996: Erik Wijmeersch
- 1997: Patrick Stevens
- 1998: Erik Wijmeersch
- 1999: Patrick Stevens
- 2000: Patrick Stevens
- 2001: Bongelemba Bongelo
- 2002: Erik Wijmeersch
- 2003: Xavier De Baerdemaker
- 2004: Patrick Stevens
- 2005: Anthony Ferro
- 2006: Anthony Ferro

=== 200 metres ===
- 1960: Jean-Pierre Barra
- 1961: Romain Poté
- 1962: Adhémar Schoufs
- 1963: Jacques Pennewaert
- 1964: Paul Poels
- 1965: Paul Poels
- 1966: Paul Poels
- 1967: Paul Poels
- 1968: Guy Stas
- 1969: Paul Poels
- 1970: Paul Poels
- 1971: Jean-Pierre Borlée
- 1972: Freddy Lucq
- 1973: Guy Stas
- 1974: Fons Brydenbach
- 1975: Fons Brydenbach
- 1976: Reno Roelandt
- 1977: Lambert Micha
- 1978: Reno Roelandt
- 1979: Jacques Borlée
- 1980: Frank Verhelst
- 1981: Jacques Borlée
- 1982: Kris Poté
- 1983: Jacques Borlée
- 1984: Jacques Borlée
- 1985: Ronald Desruelles
- 1986: Jeroen Fischer
- 1987: Jeroen Fischer
- 1988: Patrick Stevens
- 1989: Patrick Stevens
- 1990: Patrick Stevens
- 1991: Jeroen Fischer
- 1992: Patrick Stevens
- 1993: Patrick Stevens
- 1994: Patrick Stevens
- 1995: Erik Wijmeersch
- 1996: Patrick Stevens
- 1997: Erik Wijmeersch
- 1998: Erik Wijmeersch
- 1999: Erik Wijmeersch
- 2000: Patrick Stevens
- 2001: Erik Wijmeersch
- 2002: Cédric Van Branteghem
- 2003: Cédric Van Branteghem
- 2004: Anthony Ferro
- 2005: Kristof Beyens
- 2006: Cédric Van Branteghem

=== 400 metres ===
- 1960: Louis De Clerck
- 1961: Louis De Clerck
- 1962: Louis De Clerck
- 1963: Jacques Pennewaert
- 1964: Jacques Pennewaert
- 1965: Willy Vandenwyngaerden
- 1966: Willy Vandenwyngaerden
- 1967: Willy Vandenwyngaerden
- 1968: Jacques Pennewaert
- 1969: Willy Vandenwyngaerden
- 1970: Gabriel De Geyter
- 1971: Willy Vandenwyngaerden
- 1972: Gabriel De Geyter
- 1973: Fons Brydenbach
- 1974: Mario De Marchi
- 1975: Christian Allemeersch
- 1976: Fons Brydenbach
- 1977: Fons Brydenbach
- 1978: Fons Brydenbach
- 1979: Fons Brydenbach
- 1980: Eddy De Leeuw
- 1981: Fons Brydenbach
- 1982: Jacques Borlée
- 1983: Eddy De Leeuw
- 1984: Dany Roelandt
- 1985: René Hermans
- 1986: Peter Pieters
- 1987: Roland Moens
- 1988: Jeroen Fischer
- 1989: Jeroen Fischer
- 1990: Jeroen Fischer
- 1991: Bart Carlier
- 1992: Bart Carlier
- 1993: Marc Dollendorf
- 1994: Frédéric Masson
- 1995: Olivier Melchior
- 1996: Frédéric Masson
- 1997: Olivier Melchior
- 1998: Kjell Provost
- 1999: Kjell Provost
- 2000: Kjell Provost
- 2001: Cédric Van Branteghem
- 2002: Peter Haesaerts
- 2003: Christophe Lumen
- 2004: Xavier De Baerdemaker
- 2005: Cédric Van Branteghem
- 2006: Jonathan Borlée

=== 800 metres ===
- 1960: Roger Moens
- 1961: Roger Moens
- 1962: Jos Lambrechts
- 1963: Willy Mertens
- 1964: Jacques Pennewaert
- 1965: Willy Mertens
- 1966: André De Hertoghe
- 1967: Willy Mertens
- 1968: Gilbert Van Manshoven
- 1969: Tony Govaerts
- 1970: Eric Reygaert
- 1971: René Bervoets
- 1972: Herman Mignon
- 1973: Johan Van Wezer
- 1974: Johan Van Wezer
- 1975: Ivo Van Damme
- 1976: Guy Tondeur
- 1977: Tony Govaerts
- 1978: Guy Tondeur
- 1979: Julien Michiels
- 1980: Rudi De Wyngaert
- 1981: Julien Michiels
- 1982: Julien Michiels
- 1983: Walter Desmet
- 1984: Marnix Mabbe
- 1985: Philippe Detallenaere
- 1986: Marc Cortsjens
- 1987: Luc Bernaert
- 1988: Marnix Mabbe
- 1989: Luc Bernaert
- 1990: Not held
- 1991: Luc Bernaert
- 1992: Luc Bernaert
- 1993: Nathan Kahan
- 1994: Patrick Grammens
- 1995: Patrick Grammens
- 1996: Nathan Kahan
- 1997: Ben Quintelier
- 1998: Nathan Kahan
- 1999: Tim Rogge
- 2000: Nathan Kahan
- 2001: Joeri Jansen
- 2002: Joeri Jansen
- 2003: Joeri Jansen
- 2004: Tom Omey
- 2005: Tom Vanchaze
- 2006: Thomas Matthys

=== 1500 metres ===
- 1960: Daniel Allewaert
- 1961: Jos Lambrechts
- 1962: Jos Lambrechts
- 1963: Gaston Roelants
- 1964: Eugène Allonsius
- 1965: Eugène Allonsius
- 1966: Paul Roekaerts
- 1967: André De Hertoghe
- 1968: Rudi Simon
- 1969: André De Hertoghe
- 1970: André De Hertoghe
- 1971: André De Hertoghe
- 1972: Herman Mignon
- 1973: Herman Mignon
- 1974: Léon Schots
- 1975: Léon Schots
- 1976: Ivo Van Damme
- 1977: Marc Nevens
- 1978: Marc Nevens
- 1979: Marc Nevens
- 1980: Jean-Pierre Paumen
- 1981: Bob Verbeeck
- 1982: Bob Verbeeck
- 1983: Eddy Stevens
- 1984: Rudi De Wyngaert
- 1985: Vincent Rousseau
- 1986: Vincent Rousseau
- 1987: Eddy Stevens
- 1988: Vincent Rousseau
- 1989: Gino Van Geyte
- 1990: Marc Cortsjens
- 1991: Christophe Impens
- 1992: Kris Sabbe
- 1993: Christophe Impens
- 1994: Christophe Impens
- 1995: Christophe Impens
- 1996: Christophe Impens
- 1997: Christophe Impens
- 1998: Wouter Van Den Broeck
- 1999: Mohammed Mourhit
- 2000: Luc Bernaert
- 2001: Jurgen Vandewiele
- 2002: Jurgen Vandewiele
- 2003: Tim Clerbout
- 2004: Ridouane Es-Saadi
- 2005: Joeri Jansen
- 2006: Matthieu Vandiest

=== 5000 metres ===
- 1960: Eugène Allonsius
- 1961: Eugène Allonsius
- 1962: Eugène Allonsius
- 1963: Eugène Allonsius
- 1964: Eugène Allonsius
- 1965: Eugène Allonsius
- 1966: Eugène Allonsius
- 1967: Johnny Dumon
- 1968: Johnny Dumon
- 1969: Gaston Roelants
- 1970: Emiel Puttemans
- 1971: Emiel Puttemans
- 1972: Emiel Puttemans
- 1973: Emiel Puttemans
- 1974: Léon Schots
- 1975: Léon Schots
- 1976: Willy Polleunis
- 1977: Paul Thijs
- 1978: Léon Schots
- 1979: Willy Polleunis
- 1980: Emiel Puttemans
- 1981: Emiel Puttemans
- 1982: Jef Gees
- 1983: Jean-Pierre N'Dayisenga
- 1984: Vincent Rousseau
- 1985: Eddy De Pauw
- 1986: Willy Goddaert
- 1987: Vincent Rousseau
- 1988: Jean-Pierre N'Dayisenga
- 1989: Vincent Rousseau
- 1990: Raymond Van Paemel
- 1991: Ivo Claes
- 1992: Gino Van Geyte
- 1993: Ruddy Walem
- 1994: Gino Van Geyte
- 1995: Ruddy Walem
- 1996: Gino Van Geyte
- 1997: Gino Van Geyte
- 1998: Mark Thompson (AUS)
- 1999: Guy Fays
- 2000: Koen Allaert
- 2001: Tom Compernolle
- 2002: Tom Compernolle
- 2003: Christian Nemeth
- 2004: Tom Compernolle
- 2005: Stefen Van Den Broek
- 2006: Abdi Nagassa (ETH)

=== 10,000 metres ===
- 1960: Hedwig Leenaert
- 1961: Aurèle Vandendriessche
- 1962: Rik Clerckx
- 1963: Rik Clerckx
- 1964: Rik Clerckx
- 1965: Gaston Roelants
- 1966: Gaston Roelants
- 1967: Robert Folie
- 1968: Eugène Allonsius
- 1969: Gaston Roelants
- 1970: Eric Gyselinck
- 1971: Willy Polleunis
- 1972: Gaston Roelants
- 1973: Karel Lismont
- 1974: Emiel Puttemans
- 1975: Marc Smet
- 1976: Marc Smet
- 1977: Frank Grillaert
- 1978: Léon Schots
- 1979: Léon Schots
- 1980: Alex Hagelsteens
- 1981: Roger Devogel
- 1982: Léon Schots
- 1983: Erik De Beck
- 1984: Alex Hagelsteens
- 1985: Alex Hagelsteens
- 1986: Alex Hagelsteens
- 1987: Eddy De Pauw
- 1988: Jean-Pierre Paumen
- 1989: Jean-Pierre N'Dayisenga
- 1990: Ben Debognies
- 1991: Jos Maes
- 1992: Raf Wijns
- 1993: William Van Dijck
- 1994: Ivo Claes
- 1995: Ruddy Walem
- 1996: Peter De Vocht
- 1997: Gino Van Geyte
- 1998: Gino Van Geyte
- 1999: Koen Van Rie
- 2000: Koen Allaert
- 2001: Stefen Van Den Broek
- 2002: Guy Fays
- 2003: Hans Janssens
- 2004: Tom Van Hooste
- 2005: Guy Fays
- 2006: Guy Fays

=== Half marathon ===
- 1992: Rony Ligneel
- 1993: Eddy Hellebuyck
- 1994: Raf Wijns
- 1995: Ivo Claes
- 1996: Herman De Coux
- 1997: Gino Van Geyte
- 1998: Gino Van Geyte
- 1999: Koen Allaert
- 2000: Christian Nemeth
- 2001: Koen Allaert
- 2002: Wim De Keyser
- 2003: Rik Ceulemans
- 2004: Rik Ceulemans
- 2005: Rik Ceulemans

=== Marathon ===
The marathon championship was held on a short course in 1960, 1964, and 1980, but national titles were still awarded.

- 1960: Aurèle Vandendriessche
- 1961: Aurèle Vandendriessche
- 1962: Aurèle Vandendriessche
- 1963: Aurèle Vandendriessche
- 1964: Aurèle Vandendriessche
- 1965: Maurice Peiren
- 1966: Rik Clerckx
- 1967: Maurice Peiren
- 1968: Willy Vernisson
- 1969: Maurice Peiren
- 1970: Karel Lismont
- 1971: Karel Lismont
- 1972: Walter Van Renterghem
- 1973: Marnix Stevens
- 1974: Karel Lismont
- 1975: Henri Schoofs
- 1976: Henri Schoofs
- 1977: Eric Gyselinck
- 1978: Marc Smet
- 1979: Marc Smet
- 1980: Herman Parmentier
- 1981: Marc De Blander
- 1982: Fred Vandervennet
- 1983: Fred Vandervennet
- 1984: Johan Geimaert
- 1985: Fred Vandervennet
- 1986: Dirk Vanderherten
- 1987: Dirk Vanderherten
- 1988: Dirk Vanderherten
- 1989: Willy Vanhuylenbroeck
- 1990: Rony Ligneel
- 1991: Peter Daenens
- 1992: Francis Meirens
- 1993: Vincent Rousseau
- 1994: Vincent Rousseau
- 1995: Marc Verrydt
- 1996: Peter De Vocht
- 1997: Gino Van Geyte
- 1998: Gino Van Geyte
- 1999: Guy Fays
- 2000: Peter De Vocht
- 2001: Chris Verbeeck
- 2002: Rik Ceulemans
- 2003: Rik Ceulemans
- 2004: Rik Ceulemans
- 2005: Eric Gerome

=== 3000 metres steeplechase ===
- 1960: Gaston Roelants
- 1961: Gaston Roelants
- 1962: Gaston Roelants
- 1963: Gaston Roelants
- 1964: Gaston Roelants
- 1965: Gaston Roelants
- 1966: Gaston Roelants
- 1967: Gaston Roelants
- 1968: Eddy Van Butsele
- 1969: Eddy Van Butsele
- 1970: Paul Thijs
- 1971: Paul Thijs
- 1972: Paul Thijs
- 1973: Paul Thijs
- 1974: Paul Thijs
- 1975: Paul Thijs
- 1976: Paul Thijs
- 1977: Paul Thijs
- 1978: Paul Thijs
- 1979: Paul Thijs
- 1980: Johan Van Leirsberghe
- 1981: Paul Thijs
- 1982: Peter Daenens
- 1983: William Van Dijck
- 1984: Peter Daenens
- 1985: William Van Dijck
- 1986: William Van Dijck
- 1987: William Van Dijck
- 1988: William Van Dijck
- 1989: Jos Maes
- 1990: William Van Dijck
- 1991: William Van Dijck
- 1992: William Van Dijck
- 1993: Graeme Croll (GBR)
- 1994: William Van Dijck
- 1995: Jos Maes
- 1996: Maarten Vergote
- 1997: Maarten Vergote
- 1998: Martin Dent (AUS)
- 1999: Maarten Vergote
- 2000: Hilaire Ntirampeba (BDI)
- 2001: Maarten Vergote
- 2002: Maarten Vergote
- 2003: Krijn Van Koolwyk
- 2004: Pieter Desmet
- 2005: Koen Wilssens
- 2006: Koen Wilssens

=== 110 metres hurdles ===
- 1960: Georges Salmon
- 1961: Léo Marien
- 1962: Wilfried Geeroms
- 1963: Wilfried Geeroms
- 1964: Léo Marien
- 1965: Luc Legros
- 1966: Wilfried Geeroms
- 1967: Wilfried Geeroms
- 1968: Wilfried Geeroms
- 1969: Wilfried Geeroms
- 1970: Wilfried Geeroms
- 1971: Freddy Herbrand
- 1972: Freddy Herbrand
- 1973: Wilfried Geeroms
- 1974: Wilfried Geeroms
- 1975: Marc Heck
- 1976: Joseph Leseque
- 1977: André Friedenberg
- 1978: Yves Lahaye
- 1979: André Friedenberg
- 1980: André Friedenberg
- 1981: André Friedenberg
- 1982: André Friedenberg
- 1983: Dirk Vandenbosch
- 1984: Rok Folens
- 1985: Serge Liègeois
- 1986: Roland Marloye
- 1987: Serge Liègeois
- 1988: Hubert Grossard
- 1989: Hubert Grossard
- 1990: Wim Van de Ven
- 1991: Hubert Grossard
- 1992: Hubert Grossard
- 1993: Hubert Grossard
- 1994: Jonathan Nsenga
- 1995: Johan Lisabeth
- 1996: Sven Pieters
- 1997: Jonathan Nsenga
- 1998: Sven Pieters
- 1999: Jonathan Nsenga
- 2000: Hubert Grossard
- 2001: Jonathan Nsenga
- 2002: Jonathan Nsenga
- 2003: Marcel van der Westen (NED)
- 2004: Damien Broothaerts
- 2005: Jonathan Nsenga
- 2006: Jonathan Nsenga

=== 200 metres hurdles ===
- 1963: Étienne D'Heye
- 1964: Léo Marien

=== 400 metres hurdles ===
- 1960: Marcel Lambrechts
- 1961: Marcel Lambrechts
- 1962: Marcel Lambrechts
- 1963: Wilfried Geeroms
- 1964: Wilfried Geeroms
- 1965: François Van Cauwenberghe
- 1966: Théo Van Moer
- 1967: Wilfried Geeroms
- 1968: Karel Brems
- 1969: Karel Brems
- 1970: Théo Van Moer
- 1971: Wilfried Geeroms
- 1972: René Ravets
- 1973: Henri Lessire
- 1974: Willy Vandenwyngaerden
- 1975: Willy Vandenwyngaerden
- 1976: Jean-Luc Clinquart
- 1977: Jacques Borlée
- 1978: Patrick Himschoot
- 1979: Michel Zimmerman
- 1980: Michel Zimmerman
- 1981: Michel Zimmerman
- 1982: Michel Zimmerman
- 1983: Rik Tommelein
- 1984: Michel Zimmerman
- 1985: Rik Tommelein
- 1986: Rik Tommelein
- 1987: Michel Zimmerman
- 1988: Alain Cuypers
- 1989: Alain Cuypers
- 1990: Koen Verlinde
- 1991: Alain Cuypers
- 1992: Jean-Paul Bruwier
- 1993: Jean-Paul Bruwier
- 1994: Jean-Paul Bruwier
- 1995: Marc Dollendorf
- 1996: Jean-Paul Bruwier
- 1997: Jean-Paul Bruwier
- 1998: Jean-Paul Bruwier
- 1999: Jean-Paul Bruwier
- 2000: Jean-Paul Bruwier
- 2001: Stijn Verleyen
- 2002: Stijn Verleyen
- 2003: Hennie Botha (RSA)
- 2004: Rachid Malki
- 2005: Piet Deveughele
- 2006: Pieter De Schepper

=== High jump ===
- 1960: Jean Van Slype
- 1961: Charles Timmermans
- 1962: Charles Timmermans
- 1963: Charles Timmermans
- 1964: Freddy Herbrand
- 1965: Freddy Herbrand
- 1966: Yves Theisen
- 1967: Freddy Herbrand
- 1968: Yves Theisen
- 1969: Paul Dumont
- 1970: Freddy Herbrand
- 1971: Bruno Brokken
- 1972: Paul De Preter
- 1973: Guy Moreau
- 1974: Guy Moreau
- 1975: Guy Moreau
- 1976: Guy Moreau
- 1977: Guy Moreau
- 1978: Guy Moreau
- 1979: Guy Moreau
- 1980: Guy Moreau
- 1981: Peter Soetewey
- 1982: William Nachtegael
- 1983: Eddy Annys
- 1984: Marc Borra
- 1985: Eddy Annys
- 1986: Patrick Steemans
- 1987: Marc Hallemeersch
- 1988: Dimitri Maenhout
- 1989: Gerolf De Backer
- 1990: Gerolf De Backer
- 1991: Dimitri Maenhout
- 1992: Dimitri Maenhout
- 1993: Geoff Parsons (GBR)
- 1994: Dominique Sandron
- 1995: Carl Van Roeyen
- 1996: Livio Baggio
- 1997: Carl Van Roeyen
- 1998: Carl Van Roeyen
- 1999: Patrick De Paepe
- 2000: Patrick De Paepe
- 2001: Stijn Stroobants
- 2002: Stijn Stroobants
- 2003: Benoît Braconnier
- 2004: Stijn Stroobants
- 2005: Stijn Stroobants
- 2006: Stijn Stroobants

=== Pole vault ===
- 1960: Raymond Van Dijck
- 1961: Raymond Van Dijck
- 1962: Paul Coppejans
- 1963: Paul Coppejans
- 1964: Paul Coppejans
- 1965: Paul Coppejans
- 1966: Paul Coppejans
- 1967: Paul Coppejans
- 1968: Paul Coppejans
- 1969: Roger Lespagnard
- 1970: Roger Lespagnard
- 1971: Emile Dewil
- 1972: Roger Lespagnard
- 1973: Robert Jacqmain
- 1974: Emile Dewil
- 1975: Emile Dewil
- 1976: Elie Van Vlierberghe
- 1977: Elie Van Vlierberghe
- 1978: Patrick Desruelles
- 1979: Patrick Desruelles
- 1980: Patrick Desruelles
- 1981: Patrick Desruelles
- 1982: Jean-Marc Jacques
- 1983: Patrick Desruelles
- 1984: Patrick Desruelles
- 1985: Chris Rotiers
- 1986: Kris De Ridder
- 1987: Dirk Ledegen
- 1988: Marc Maes
- 1989: Peter Moreels
- 1990: Domitien Mestré
- 1991: Alan De Naeyer
- 1992: Peter Moreels
- 1993: Alan De Naeyer
- 1994: Alan De Naeyer
- 1995: Domitien Mestré
- 1996: Rens Blom
- 1997: Peter Moreels
- 1998: Wesley Rombaut
- 1999: Thibaut Duval
- 2000: Thibaut Duval
- 2001: Kevin Rans
- 2002: Thibaut Duval
- 2003: Thibaut Duval
- 2004: Kevin Rans
- 2005: Kevin Rans
- 2006: Kevin Rans

=== Long jump ===
- 1960: Walter Herssens
- 1961: Georges Salmon
- 1962: Jean Debroux
- 1963: Georges Salmon
- 1964: Willy De Rijcke
- 1965: Yves Theisen
- 1966: Yves Theisen
- 1967: Yves Theisen
- 1968: Yves Theisen
- 1969: Philippe Houseaux
- 1970: Yves Theisen
- 1971: Freddy Herbrand
- 1972: Freddy Herbrand
- 1973: Yves Theisen
- 1974: Yves Theisen
- 1975: Ronald Desruelles
- 1976: Ronald Desruelles
- 1977: Ronald Desruelles
- 1978: Ronald Desruelles
- 1979: Ronald Desruelles
- 1980: Roland Marloye
- 1981: Ronald Desruelles
- 1982: Ronald Desruelles
- 1983: Ronald Desruelles
- 1984: Ronald Desruelles
- 1985: Eric Adère
- 1986: Ronald Desruelles
- 1987: Jeroen Fischer
- 1988: Eric Van de Vijver
- 1989: Laurent Broothaerts
- 1990: Laurent Broothaerts
- 1991: Rudi Van Lancker
- 1992: Rudi Van Lancker
- 1993: Tom Hofmans
- 1994: Erik Nys
- 1995: Erik Nys
- 1996: Hugues Branle
- 1997: Erik Nys
- 1998: Jai Taurima (AUS)
- 1999: Erik Nys
- 2000: David Branle
- 2001: David Branle
- 2002: Jan Guns
- 2003: Jan Guns
- 2004: Gert Messiaen
- 2005: Gert Messiaen
- 2006: Michael Velter

=== Triple jump ===
- 1960: Walter Herssens
- 1961: Jacques Septon
- 1962: Guy Lukowski
- 1963: Freddy Herbrand
- 1964: Freddy Herbrand
- 1965: Freddy Herbrand
- 1966: Jacques Septon
- 1967: Albert Van Hoorn
- 1968: Albert Van Hoorn
- 1969: Albert Van Hoorn
- 1970: Leopold Van Hamme
- 1971: Leopold Van Hamme
- 1972: Albert Van Hoorn
- 1973: Albert Van Hoorn
- 1974: Albert Van Hoorn
- 1975: Luc Carlier
- 1976: Luc Carlier
- 1977: Luc Carlier
- 1978: Luc Carlier
- 1979: Luc Carlier
- 1980: Didier Falise
- 1981: Didier Falise
- 1982: Didier Falise
- 1983: Benoît Lambert
- 1984: Didier Falise
- 1985: Didier Falise
- 1986: Didier Falise
- 1987: Didier Falise
- 1988: Didier Falise
- 1989: Didier Falise
- 1990: Didier Falise
- 1991: Bert Tomme
- 1992: Bert Tomme
- 1993: Kedjeloba Mambo
- 1994: Djeke Mambo
- 1995: Kedjeloba Mambo
- 1996: Djeke Mambo
- 1997: Kedjeloba Mambo
- 1998: Kedjeloba Mambo
- 1999: Kedjeloba Mambo
- 2000: Djeke Mambo
- 2001: Djeke Mambo
- 2002: Michael Velter
- 2003: Michael Velter
- 2004: Michael Velter
- 2005: Gert Brijs
- 2006: Djeke Mambo

=== Shot put ===
- 1960: Édouard Szostak
- 1961: Édouard Szostak
- 1962: Édouard Szostak
- 1963: Édouard Szostak
- 1964: Roland Borrey
- 1965: Bertrand De Decker
- 1966: Roland Borrey
- 1967: Bertrand De Decker
- 1968: Bertrand De Decker
- 1969: François Hoste
- 1970: Bertrand De Decker
- 1971: Bertrand De Decker
- 1972: Georges Schroeder
- 1973: Georges Schroeder
- 1974: Georges Schroeder
- 1975: Georges Schroeder
- 1976: Georges Schroeder
- 1977: Robert Van Schoor
- 1978: Georges Schroeder
- 1979: Georges Schroeder
- 1980: Georges Schroeder
- 1981: Georges Schroeder
- 1982: Noël Legros
- 1983: Georges Schroeder
- 1984: Noël Legros
- 1985: Noël Legros
- 1986: Noël Legros
- 1987: Noël Legros
- 1988: Noël Legros
- 1989: Stephan Ulrich
- 1990: Noël Legros
- 1991: Stephan Ulrich
- 1992: Christoph Dupont
- 1993: Ioav Sherf (ISR)
- 1994: Kurt Boffel
- 1995: Peter Van Den Eyden
- 1996: Wim Blondeel
- 1997: Wim Blondeel
- 1998: Wim Blondeel
- 1999: Wim Blondeel
- 2000: Filip Eeckhout
- 2001: Wim Blondeel
- 2002: Filip Eeckhout
- 2003: Wim Blondeel
- 2004: Wim Blondeel
- 2005: Wim Blondeel
- 2006: Wim Blondeel

=== Discus throw ===
- 1960: Édouard Szostak
- 1961: Édouard Szostak
- 1962: Édouard Szostak
- 1963: Édouard Szostak
- 1964: Bertrand De Decker
- 1965: Édouard Szostak
- 1966: Marcel Hertogs
- 1967: Bertrand De Decker
- 1968: Bertrand De Decker
- 1969: Robert Van Schoor
- 1970: Georges Schroeder
- 1971: Georges Schroeder
- 1972: Georges Schroeder
- 1973: Georges Schroeder
- 1974: Georges Schroeder
- 1975: Robert Van Schoor
- 1976: Georges Schroeder
- 1977: Georges Schroeder
- 1978: Georges Schroeder
- 1979: Georges Schroeder
- 1980: Georges Schroeder
- 1981: Georges Schroeder
- 1982: Robert Van Schoor
- 1983: Georges Schroeder
- 1984: Robert Van Schoor
- 1985: Georges Schroeder
- 1986: Robert Van Schoor
- 1987: Georges Schroeder
- 1988: Jordy Beernaert
- 1989: Jordy Beernaert
- 1990: Jo Van Daele
- 1991: Herman Van Uytven
- 1992: Jordy Beernaert
- 1993: Jo Van Daele
- 1994: Jo Van Daele
- 1995: Jo Van Daele
- 1996: Jo Van Daele
- 1997: Jo Van Daele
- 1998: Jo Van Daele
- 1999: Jo Van Daele
- 2000: Jo Van Daele
- 2001: Kris Coene
- 2002: Jo Van Daele
- 2003: Jo Van Daele
- 2004: Jo Van Daele
- 2005: Jo Van Daele
- 2006: Milosz Tomanek

=== Hammer throw ===
- 1960: Henri Haest
- 1961: Henri Haest
- 1962: Henri Haest
- 1963: Henri Haest
- 1964: Henri Haest
- 1965: Marcel Hertogs
- 1966: Marcel Hertogs
- 1967: Marcel Hertogs
- 1968: Marcel Hertogs
- 1969: Marcel Hertogs
- 1970: Édouard Van der Bleeken
- 1971: Jacques Mortier
- 1972: Marcel Hertogs
- 1973: Édouard Van der Bleeken
- 1974: Édouard Van der Bleeken
- 1975: Édouard Van der Bleeken
- 1976: Jacques Mortier
- 1977: Jacques Mortier
- 1978: Jacques Mortier
- 1979: Jacques Mortier
- 1980: Hugo Ciroux
- 1981: Guy Pierre
- 1982: Marnix Verhegghe
- 1983: Marnix Verhegghe
- 1984: Marnix Verhegghe
- 1985: Marnix Verhegghe
- 1986: Marnix Verhegghe
- 1987: Marnix Verhegghe
- 1988: Marnix Verhegghe
- 1989: Marnix Verhegghe
- 1990: Marnix Verhegghe
- 1991: Marnix Verhegghe
- 1992: Marnix Verhegghe
- 1993: Alex Malachenko
- 1994: Alex Malachenko
- 1995: Alex Malachenko
- 1996: Alex Malachenko
- 1997: Alex Malachenko
- 1998: Alex Malachenko
- 1999: Alex Malachenko
- 2000: Walter De Wyngaert
- 2001: Jelle Degraeuwe
- 2002: Walter De Wyngaert
- 2003: Walter De Wyngaert
- 2004: Walter De Wyngaert
- 2005: Walter De Wyngaert
- 2006: Walter De Wyngaert

=== Javelin throw ===
- 1960: Guy Van Zeune
- 1961: Guy Van Zeune
- 1962: Guy Van Zeune
- 1963: Charles De Backere
- 1964: Guy Van Zeune
- 1965: Guy Van Zeune
- 1966: Jacques Claessen
- 1967: Lode Wijns
- 1968: Guy Van Zeune
- 1969: Lode Wijns
- 1970: Louis Fortamps
- 1971: Lode Wijns
- 1972: Lode Wijns
- 1973: Lode Wijns
- 1974: Lode Wijns
- 1975: Lode Wijns
- 1976: Lode Wijns
- 1977: Lode Wijns
- 1978: Anton Duchateau
- 1979: Lode Wijns
- 1980: Luc Carlier
- 1981: Anton Duchateau
- 1982: Paul Deroo
- 1983: Anton Duchateau
- 1984: Jean-Paul Schlatter
- 1985: Jean-Paul Schlatter
- 1986: Frank Stockmans
- 1987: Jean-Paul Schlatter
- 1988: Jean-Paul Schlatter
- 1989: Frank Stockmans
- 1990: Jerome Putzeys
- 1991: Jean-Paul Schlatter
- 1992: Frank Stockmans
- 1993: Jean-Paul Schlatter
- 1994: Marc Van Mensel
- 1995: Johan Kloeck
- 1996: Marc Van Mensel
- 1997: Johan Kloeck
- 1998: Andrew Martin (AUS)
- 1999: Johan Kloeck
- 2000: Marc Van Mensel
- 2001: Marc Van Mensel
- 2002: Marc Van Mensel
- 2003: Marc Van Mensel
- 2004: Marc Van Mensel
- 2005: Marc Van Mensel
- 2006: Loïc Lemaître

=== Decathlon ===
- 1960: Léo Marien
- 1961: Georges Salmon
- 1962: Léo Marien
- 1963: Adhémar Schoufs
- 1964: Jozef Kloeck
- 1965: Daniel Borrey
- 1966: Roger Lespagnard
- 1967: Roger Lespagnard
- 1968: Freddy Herbrand
- 1969: Roger Lespagnard
- 1970: Freddy Herbrand
- 1971: Freddy Herbrand
- 1972: Régis Ghesquière
- 1973: Freddy Herbrand
- 1974: Régis Ghesquière
- 1975: Régis Ghesquière
- 1976: Roger Lespagnard
- 1977: Régis Ghesquière
- 1978: André Friedenberg
- 1979: André Friedenberg
- 1980: Piet Van Vaerenbergh
- 1981: Roland Marloye
- 1982: Piet Van Vaerenbergh
- 1983: Piet Van Vaerenbergh
- 1984: Roland Marloye
- 1985: Roland Marloye
- 1986: Roland Marloye
- 1987: Erwin Van Nieuwenhove
- 1988: Roland Marloye
- 1989: Erwin Van Nieuwenhove
- 1990: Vincent Verleye
- 1991: Vincent Verleye
- 1992: Bert Van Opstel
- 1993: Vincent Verleye
- 1994: Raf Coomans
- 1995: Serge De Smet
- 1996: Serge De Smet
- 1997: Wim Van Meerbeeck
- 1998: Raf Coomans
- 1999: Serge De Smet
- 2000: Steve De Baer
- 2001: Serge De Smet
- 2002: Frank Vandaele
- 2003: Frédéric Xhonneux
- 2004: François Gourmet
- 2005: Hans Van Alphen
- 2006: Loïc Lemaître

=== 20 kilometres walk ===
The event was held on a track from 1987 to 1989, 1994–6, 1999, and 2003.

- 1960: Joël Vanderhaeghen
- 1961: Robert Schoukens
- 1962: Joël Vanderhaeghen
- 1963: Robert Rinchard
- 1964: Robert Schoukens
- 1965: Robert Schoukens
- 1966: Maurice Van Liedekerke
- 1967: Maurice Van Liedekerke
- 1968: Robert Rinchard
- 1969: Robert Rinchard
- 1970: Maurice Van Liedekerke
- 1971: Léon Peeters
- 1972: Godfried Dejonckheere
- 1973: Godfried Dejonckheere
- 1974: Godfried Dejonckheere
- 1975: Godfried Dejonckheere
- 1976: Godfried Dejonckheere
- 1977: Godfried Dejonckheere
- 1978: Godfried Dejonckheere
- 1979: Marc Musiaux
- 1980: Marc Musiaux
- 1981: Gérard Goujon
- 1982: Donald Debel
- 1983: Donald Debel
- 1984: Eric Ledune
- 1985: Eric Ledune
- 1986: Jos Martens
- 1987: Jos Martens
- 1988: Godfried Dejonckheere
- 1989: Godfried Dejonckheere
- 1990: Godfried Dejonckheere
- 1991: Gérard Goujon
- 1992: Godfried Dejonckheere
- 1993: ?
- 1994: Benjamin Leroy
- 1995: Benjamin Leroy
- 1996: Benjamin Leroy
- 1997: Dirk Nicque
- 1998: Benjamin Leroy
- 1999: Benjamin Leroy
- 2000: Dirk Bogaert
- 2001: Benjamin Leroy
- 2002: Christophe Humé
- 2003: Christophe Humé
- 2004: Frank Buytaert
- 2005: Frank Buytaert
- 2006: Loïc Lemaître

=== 50 kilometres walk ===
- 1960: Joël Vanderhaeghen
- 1961: Robert Schoukens
- 1962: Robert Schoukens
- 1963: Louis Schenk
- 1964: Robert Schoukens
- 1965: Gérard Cnockaert
- 1966: Robert Rinchard
- 1967: René Timmermans
- 1968: Robert Schoukens
- 1969: Robert Rinchard
- 1970: Pierre Bellanger
- 1971: Robert Rinchard
- 1972: Léon Peeters
- 1973: Godfried Dejonckheere
- 1974: Christian Halloy
- 1975: Godfried Dejonckheere
- 1976: Godfried Dejonckheere
- 1977: Gérard Goujon
- 1978: Christian Halloy
- 1979: Gérard Goujon
- 1980: Gérard Goujon
- 1981: Gérard Goujon
- 1982: Donald Debel
- 1983: Gérard Goujon
- 1984: Not held
- 1985: Godfried Dejonckheere
- 1986: Eric Ledune
- 1987: Godfried Dejonckheere
- 1988: Godfried Dejonckheere
- 1989: Godfried Dejonckheere
- 1990: Godfried Dejonckheere
- 1991: Godfried Dejonckheere
- 1992: Godfried Dejonckheere
- 1993: ?
- 1994: Luc Nicque
- 1995: Dirk Nicque
- 1996: Dirk Nicque
- 1997: Luc Nicque
- 1998: ?
- 1999: ?
- 2000: ?
- 2001: ?
- 2002: Christophe Humé
- 2003: Christophe Humé
- 2004: Frank Buytaert
- 2005: Dirk Nicque
- 2006: Loïc Lemaître

=== Cross country (long course) ===
- 1960: Hedwig Leenaert
- 1961: Gaston Roelants
- 1962: Gaston Roelants
- 1963: Gaston Roelants
- 1964: Gaston Roelants
- 1965: Rik Clerckx
- 1966: Gaston Roelants
- 1967: Gaston Roelants
- 1968: Gaston Roelants
- 1969: Gaston Roelants
- 1970: Gaston Roelants
- 1971: Willy Polleunis
- 1972: Gaston Roelants
- 1973: Willy Polleunis
- 1974: Erik De Beck
- 1975: Emiel Puttemans
- 1976: Erik De Beck
- 1977: Karel Lismont
- 1978: Willy Polleunis
- 1979: Léon Schots
- 1980: Karel Lismont
- 1981: Emiel Puttemans
- 1982: Léon Schots
- 1983: Léon Schots
- 1984: Vincent Rousseau
- 1985: Jef Gees
- 1986: Eddy De Pauw
- 1987: Vincent Rousseau
- 1988: Vincent Rousseau
- 1989: Jos Maes
- 1990: Vincent Rousseau
- 1991: Vincent Rousseau
- 1992: Vincent Rousseau
- 1993: Vincent Rousseau
- 1994: Vincent Rousseau
- 1995: Vincent Rousseau
- 1996: William Van Dijck
- 1997: Mohammed Mourhit
- 1998: Mohammed Mourhit
- 1999: Mohammed Mourhit
- 2000: Jerry Van Den Eede
- 2001: Tom Van Hooste
- 2002: Tom Van Hooste
- 2003: Tom Van Hooste
- 2004: Tom Compernolle
- 2005: Tom Van Hooste
- 2006: Pieter Desmet

=== Cross country (short course) ===
- 1992: Christophe Impens
- 1993: Bert Meganck
- 1994: Rudy Vlasselaer
- 1995: Rudy Vlasselaer
- 1996: Frédéric Desmedt
- 1997: François Carpentier
- 1998: Wouter Van Den Broeck
- 1999: Luc Bernaert
- 2000: Patrick Grammens
- 2001: Jurgen Vandewiele
- 2002: Ridouane Es-Saadi
- 2003: Ridouane Es-Saadi
- 2004: Ridouane Es-Saadi
- 2005: Mario Van Waeyenberge
- 2006: Mario Van Waeyenberge

== Women ==
=== 100 metres ===
- 1960: Hilde De Cort
- 1961: Therese Schueremans
- 1962: Doreete Van de Broeck
- 1963: Therese Schueremans
- 1964: Therese Schueremans
- 1965: Monique Vanherck
- 1966: Monique Vanherck
- 1967: Monique Vanherck
- 1968: Rozika Verberck
- 1969: Rita Jacobs
- 1970: Francine Van Assche
- 1971: Francine Van Assche
- 1972: Lea Alaerts
- 1973: Lea Alaerts
- 1974: Véronique Colonval
- 1975: Lea Alaerts
- 1976: Lea Alaerts
- 1977: Lea Alaerts
- 1978: Katrien Hoeree
- 1979: Lea Alaerts
- 1980: Lea Alaerts
- 1981: Liliane Meganck
- 1982: Liliane Meganck
- 1983: Karin Verguts
- 1984: Ingrid Verbruggen
- 1985: Ingrid Verbruggen
- 1986: Tonia Oliviers
- 1987: Ingrid Verbruggen
- 1988: Ingrid Verbruggen
- 1989: Ingrid Verbruggen
- 1990: Anne Carrette
- 1991: Katrien Maenhout
- 1992: Valérie Denis
- 1993: Aileen McGillivary (GBR)
- 1994: Sandrine Hennart
- 1995: Sandrine Hennart
- 1996: Kim Gevaert
- 1997: Nancy Callaerts
- 1998: Kim Gevaert
- 1999: Kim Gevaert
- 2000: Kim Gevaert
- 2001: Kim Gevaert
- 2002: Kim Gevaert
- 2003: Kim Gevaert
- 2004: Kim Gevaert
- 2005: Kim Gevaert
- 2006: Kim Gevaert
- 2007:
- 2008:
- 2009:
- 2010:
- 2011:
- 2012:
- 2013:
- 2014:
- 2015:
- 2016:
- 2017:
- 2018: Manon Depuydt
- 2019: Manon Depuydt

=== 200 metres ===
- 1960: Adelhaid Denorme
- 1961: Jannine Knaepen
- 1962: Therese Schueremans
- 1963: Therese Schueremans
- 1964: Louise Fricq
- 1965: Annie-Paule Knipping
- 1966: Louise Fricq
- 1967: Rozika Verberck
- 1968: Godelieve Ducatteeuw
- 1969: Godelieve Ducatteeuw
- 1970: Francine Van Assche
- 1971: Francine Van Assche
- 1972: Véronique Colonval
- 1973: Rosine Wallez
- 1974: Rosine Wallez
- 1975: Lea Alaerts
- 1976: Lea Alaerts
- 1977: Lea Alaerts
- 1978: Katrien Hoeree
- 1979: Lea Alaerts
- 1980: Lea Alaerts
- 1981: Edith De Maertelaere
- 1982: Liliane Meganck
- 1983: Karin Verguts
- 1984: Karin Verguts
- 1985: Ingrid Verbruggen
- 1986: Tonia Oliviers
- 1987: Ingrid Verbruggen
- 1988: Ingrid Verbruggen
- 1989: Ingrid Verbruggen
- 1990: Sylvia Dethier
- 1991: Sylvia Dethier
- 1992: Sylvia Dethier
- 1993: Aileen McGillivary (GBR)
- 1994: Sylvia Dethier
- 1995: Kim Gevaert
- 1996: Kim Gevaert
- 1997: Kim Gevaert
- 1998: Kim Gevaert
- 1999: Kim Gevaert
- 2000: Katleen De Caluwé
- 2001: Kim Gevaert
- 2002: Audrey Rochtus
- 2003: Audrey Rochtus
- 2004: Kim Gevaert
- 2005: Kim Gevaert
- 2006: Kim Gevaert

=== 400 metres ===
- 1960: Marie-Louise Wirix
- 1961: Marie-Louise Wirix
- 1962: Marie-Louise Wirix
- 1963: Godelieve Roggeman
- 1964: Godelieve Roggeman
- 1965: Annie-Paule Knipping
- 1966: Marie-Claire Clerbout
- 1967: Annie-Paule Knipping
- 1968: Danielle Leveque
- 1969: Francine Peyskens
- 1970: Annie-Paule Knipping
- 1971: Marina Bruynooghe
- 1972: Godelieve Ducatteeuw
- 1973: Lea Alaerts
- 1974: Rosine Wallez
- 1975: Rosine Wallez
- 1976: Regine Berg
- 1977: Rosine Wallez
- 1978: Rosine Wallez
- 1979: Anne Michel
- 1980: Rosine Wallez
- 1981: Rosine Wallez
- 1982: Rosine Wallez
- 1983: Regine Berg
- 1984: Regine Berg
- 1985: Regine Berg
- 1986: Regine Berg
- 1987: Anne Carrette
- 1988: Sonja Van Renterghem
- 1989: Anne Carrette
- 1990: Katrien Maenhout
- 1991: Katrien Maenhout
- 1992: Martine Meersman
- 1993: Katrien Maenhout
- 1994: Katrien Maenhout
- 1995: Katrien Maenhout
- 1996: Bieke Masselis
- 1997: Yelena Golesheva (RUS)
- 1998: Katrien Maenhout
- 1999: Sandra Stals
- 2000: Sandra Stals
- 2001: Sandra Stals
- 2002: Sandra Stals
- 2003: Marleen Baggerman
- 2004: Sandra Stals
- 2005: Sandra Stals
- 2006: Kristine Strackx

=== 800 metres ===
- 1960: Marie-Louise Wirix
- 1961: Marie-Louise Wirix
- 1962: Marie-Louise Wirix
- 1963: Godelieve Roggeman
- 1964: Anne-Marie Deffernez
- 1965: Anne-Marie Deffernez
- 1966: Marie-Claire Clerbout
- 1967: Marie-Claire Decroix
- 1968: Francine Peyskens
- 1969: Francine Peyskens
- 1970: Francine Peyskens
- 1971: Francine Peyskens
- 1972: Marleen Verheuen
- 1973: Anne-Marie Van Nuffel
- 1974: Anne-Marie Van Nuffel
- 1975: Rita Thijs
- 1976: Bernadette Van Roy
- 1977: Bernadette Van Roy
- 1978: Anne-Marie Van Nuffel
- 1979: Anne-Marie Van Nuffel & Betty Van Steenbroek
- 1980: Betty Van Steenbroek
- 1981: Viviane Depre
- 1982: Anne-Marie Van Nuffel
- 1983: Rosine Wallez
- 1984: Isabelle De Bruycker
- 1985: Isabelle De Bruycker
- 1986: Isabelle De Bruycker
- 1987: Regine Berg
- 1988: Regine Berg
- 1989: Anneke Matthys
- 1990: Anneke Matthys
- 1991: Sonja Van Renterghem
- 1992: Anneke Matthys
- 1993: Anneke Matthys
- 1994: Anneke Matthys
- 1995: Sandra Stals
- 1996: Anneke Matthys
- 1997: Anneke Matthys
- 1998: Sandra Stals
- 1999: Sigrid Vanden Bempt
- 2000: Ludivine Michel
- 2001: Mieke Geens
- 2002: Mieke Geens
- 2003: Sandra Stals
- 2004: Shanna Major
- 2005: Shanna Major
- 2006: Lieselot Matthys

=== 1500 metres ===
- 1969: Marie-Claire Decroix
- 1970: Lutgarde Van Brempt
- 1971: Joske Van Santberghe
- 1972: Bernadette Van Roy
- 1973: Sonja Castelein
- 1974: Sonja Castelein
- 1975: Sonja Castelein
- 1976: Bernadette Van Roy
- 1977: Gertrude Meersseman
- 1978: Anne-Marie Van Nuffel
- 1979: Anne-Marie Van Nuffel
- 1980: Anne-Marie Van Nuffel
- 1981: Betty Van Steenbroek
- 1982: Betty Van Steenbroek
- 1983: Betty Van Steenbroek
- 1984: Betty Van Steenbroek
- 1985: Corinne Debaets
- 1986: Corinne Debaets
- 1987: Corinne Debaets
- 1988: Corinne Debaets
- 1989: Tania Merchiers
- 1990: Rita Thijs
- 1991: Anja Smolders
- 1992: Anja Smolders
- 1993: Anja Smolders
- 1994: Anja Smolders
- 1995: Tania Merchiers
- 1996: Anja Smolders
- 1997: Anja Smolders
- 1998: Anja Smolders
- 1999: Anja Smolders
- 2000: Veerle Dejaeghere
- 2001: Veerle Dejaeghere
- 2002: Veerle Dejaeghere
- 2003: Veerle Dejaeghere
- 2004: Veerle Dejaeghere
- 2005: Veerle Dejaeghere
- 2006: Veerle Dejaeghere

=== 3000 metres ===
- 1973: Marleen Mols
- 1974: Sonja Castelein
- 1975: Sonja Castelein
- 1976: Marleen Mols
- 1977: Sonja Castelein
- 1978: Daniele Justin
- 1979: Leen Van Brempt
- 1980: Mimi Steels
- 1981: Christel Jennis
- 1982: Corinne Debaets
- 1983: Francine Peeters
- 1984: Corinne Debaets
- 1985: Betty Van Steenbroek
- 1986: Ria Van Landeghem
- 1987: Marleen Renders
- 1988: Corinne Debaets
- 1989: Tania Merchiers
- 1990: Corinne Debaets
- 1991: Ingrid Delagrange
- 1992: Maria Van Gestel
- 1993: Anja Smolders
- 1994: Anne-Marie Danneels

=== 5000 metres ===
- 1995: Marleen Renders
- 1996: Marleen Renders
- 1997: Anne-Marie Danneels
- 1998: Anne-Marie Danneels
- 1999: Fatiha Baouf
- 2000: Anja Smolders
- 2001: Stefanija Stakuvienė (LTU)
- 2002: Mounia Aboulahcen
- 2003: Sigrid Vanden Bempt
- 2004: Fatiha Baouf
- 2005: Nathalie De Vos
- 2006: Anja Smolders

=== 10,000 metres ===
- 1984: Ria Van Landeghem
- 1985: Magda Ilands
- 1986: Magda Ilands
- 1987: Magda Ilands
- 1988: Marleen Renders
- 1989: Véronique Collard
- 1990: Maria Van Gestel
- 1991: Maria Van Gestel
- 1992: Véronique Collard
- 1993: Véronique Collard
- 1994: Marleen Renders
- 1995: Anne-Marie Danneels
- 1996: Isabelle Collier
- 1997: Marleen Renders
- 1998: Marleen Renders
- 1999: Marleen Renders
- 2000: Marleen Renders
- 2001: Mounia Aboulahcen
- 2002: Mounia Aboulahcen
- 2003: Marleen Renders
- 2004: Mounia Aboulahcen
- 2005: Anja Smolders
- 2006: Mounia Aboulahcen

=== Half marathon ===
- 1992: ?
- 1993: Véronique Collard
- 1994: Marleen Renders
- 1995: Marleen Renders
- 1996: Sonja Deckers
- 1997: Sonja Deckers
- 1998: Marleen Renders
- 1999: Marleen Van Bael
- 2000: Ann Parmentier
- 2001: Ann Parmentier
- 2002: Ann Parmentier
- 2003: Catherine Lallemand
- 2004: Nathalie De Vos
- 2005: Nathalie Loubele

=== Marathon ===
- 1983: Marie-Christine Deurbroeck
- 1984: Marie-Christine Deurbroeck
- 1985: Agnes Pardaens
- 1986: Agnes Pardaens
- 1987: Nelly Aerts
- 1988: Magda Ilands
- 1989: Nelly Aerts
- 1990: Christel Rogiers
- 1991: Christel Rogiers
- 1992: Viviane Van Buggenhout
- 1993: Françoise Maton
- 1994: Françoise Maton
- 1995: Françoise Maton
- 1996: Virginie Van Droogenbroeck
- 1997: Françoise Maton
- 1998: Catharina Seghers
- 1999: Katja Merlin
- 2000: Katja Merlin
- 2001: Katja Merlin
- 2002: Mounia Aboulahcen
- 2003: Marijke Guillemyn
- 2004: Mounia Aboulahcen
- 2005: Veerle D'Haese

=== 3000 metres steeplechase ===
- 2001: Sigrid Vanden Bempt
- 2002: Sigrid Vanden Bempt
- 2003: Sigrid Vanden Bempt
- 2004: Stephanie De Croock
- 2005: Sigrid Vanden Bempt
- 2006: Veerle Dejaeghere

=== 80 metres hurdles ===
- 1960: Hilde De Cort
- 1961: Gerarda Lambrechts
- 1962: Gerarda Lambrechts
- 1963: Hilde De Cort
- 1964: Hilde De Cort
- 1965: Roswitha Emonts-Gast
- 1966: Roswitha Emonts-Gast
- 1967: ?
- 1968: ?

=== 100 metres hurdles ===
- 1969: Anne Van Rensbergen
- 1970: Roswitha Emonts-Gast
- 1971: Anne Van Rensbergen
- 1972: Roswitha Emonts-Gast
- 1973: Carine De Bode
- 1974: Anne Van Rensbergen
- 1975: Anne-Marie Pira
- 1976: Anne-Marie Pira
- 1977: Anne-Marie Pira
- 1978: Lea Alaerts
- 1979: Anne-Marie Pira
- 1980: Anne-Marie Pira
- 1981: Myriam Wery
- 1982: Christa Vandercruyssen
- 1983: Sylvia Dethier
- 1984: Christa Vandercruyssen
- 1985: Sylvia Dethier
- 1986: Sylvia Dethier
- 1987: Sylvia Dethier
- 1988: Sylvia Dethier
- 1989: Véronique Storme
- 1990: Sylvia Dethier
- 1991: Sylvia Dethier
- 1992: Sylvia Dethier
- 1993: Caroline Delplancke
- 1994: Sylvia Dethier
- 1995: Nadine Grouwels
- 1996: Ann Mercken
- 1997: Myriam Tschomba
- 1998: Myriam Tschomba
- 1999: Myriam Tschomba
- 2000: Nadine Grouwels
- 2001: Nadine Grouwels
- 2002: Élodie Ouédraogo
- 2003: Judith Vis (NED)
- 2004: Elisabeth Davin
- 2005: Elisabeth Davin
- 2006: Eline Berings

=== 200 metres hurdles ===
- 1969: Nora Mommens
- 1970: Rozika Verberck
- 1971: ?
- 1972: ?
- 1973: ?
- 1974: Rozika Verberck
- 1975: Rozika Verberck

=== 400 metres hurdles ===
- 1976: Rozika Verberck
- 1977: Lea Alaerts
- 1978: Lea Alaerts
- 1979: Christiane Van Landschoot
- 1980: Martine Vandeweyer
- 1981: Anne Michel
- 1982: Christa Vandercruyssen
- 1983: Christiane Van Landschoot
- 1984: Jacqueline Hautenauve
- 1985: Françoise Dethier
- 1986: Nathalie Nisen
- 1987: Nathalie Nisen
- 1988: Ann Maenhout
- 1989: Ann Maenhout
- 1990: Ann Maenhout
- 1991: Françoise Dethier
- 1992: Ann Maenhout
- 1993: Françoise Dethier
- 1994: Mélanie Moreels
- 1995: Ann Mercken
- 1996: Ann Mercken
- 1997: Mélanie Moreels
- 1998: Ann Mercken
- 1999: Ann Mercken
- 2000: Ann Mercken
- 2001: Ann Mercken
- 2002: Ann Mercken
- 2003: Nele Van Doninck
- 2004: Joke Mortier
- 2005: Carole Kaboud Mebam (CMR)
- 2006: Carole Kaboud Mebam (CMR)

=== High jump ===
- 1960: Lieve Brys
- 1961: Jannine Knaepen
- 1962: Lieve Brys
- 1963: Gillaine Depauw
- 1964: Anita Van der Aa
- 1965: Rita Vanherck
- 1966: Rita Vanherck
- 1967: Rita Vanherck
- 1968: Rita Vanherck
- 1969: Helga Deprez
- 1970: Rita Vanherck
- 1971: Roswitha Emonts-Gast
- 1972: Hilde Van Dijck
- 1973: Hilde Van Dijck
- 1974: Christiane Van Landschoot
- 1975: Hilde Van Dijck
- 1976: Anne-Marie Pira
- 1977: Anne-Marie Pira
- 1978: Anne-Marie Pira
- 1979: Christine Soetewey
- 1980: Christine Soetewey
- 1981: Françoise Van Poelvoorde
- 1982: Christine Soetewey
- 1983: Christine Soetewey
- 1984: Christine Soetewey
- 1985: Christine Soetewey
- 1986: Christine Soetewey
- 1987: Christine Soetewey
- 1988: Natalja Jonckheere
- 1989: Sabine De Wachter
- 1990: May Verheyen
- 1991: Natalja Jonckheere
- 1992: Sabrina De Leeuw
- 1993: Sabrina De Leeuw
- 1994: Natalja Jonckheere
- 1995: Natalja Jonckheere
- 1996: Sabrina De Leeuw
- 1997: Sabrina De Leeuw
- 1998: Heidi Paesen
- 1999: Sabrina De Leeuw
- 2000: Tia Hellebaut
- 2001: Sabrina De Leeuw
- 2002: Tia Hellebaut
- 2003: Tia Hellebaut
- 2004: Sabrina De Leeuw
- 2005: Tia Hellebaut
- 2006: Sabrina De Leeuw

=== Pole vault ===
- 1995: Sophie Zubiolo
- 1996: Sophie Zubiolo
- 1997: Sophie Zubiolo
- 1998: Christie Elwin (AUS)
- 1999: Iréna Dufour
- 2000: Liesbet Van Roie
- 2001: Caroline Goetghebuer
- 2002: Iréna Dufour
- 2003: Karen Pollefeyt
- 2004: Iréna Dufour
- 2005: Iréna Dufour
- 2006: Karen Pollefeyt

=== Long jump ===
- 1960: Gerarda Lambrechts
- 1961: Doreete Van de Broeck
- 1962: Doreete Van de Broeck
- 1963: Doreete Van de Broeck
- 1964: Rose-Marie De Bruycker
- 1965: Rose-Marie De Bruycker
- 1966: Monique Vanherck
- 1967: Monique Vanherck
- 1968: Roswitha Emonts-Gast
- 1969: Monique Vanherck
- 1970: Monique Vanherck
- 1971: Marleen Van Aerden
- 1972: Maritia De Voeght
- 1973: Rosine Wallez
- 1974: Maritia De Voeght
- 1975: Maritia De Voeght
- 1976: Maritia De Voeght
- 1977: Nadine Marloye
- 1978: Maritia De Voeght
- 1979: Rosanne Corneille
- 1980: Anne-Marie Pira
- 1981: Myriam Duchateau
- 1982: Brigitte Butaeye
- 1983: Myriam Duchateau
- 1984: Myriam Duchateau
- 1985: Hilda Vervaet
- 1986: Hilda Vervaet
- 1987: Hilda Vervaet
- 1988: Jacqueline Hautenauve
- 1989: Veerle Jennes
- 1990: Veerle Jennes
- 1991: Sandrine Hennart
- 1992: Hilda Vervaet
- 1993: Sandrine Hennart
- 1994: Sandrine Hennart
- 1995: Sandrine Hennart
- 1996: Sandrine Hennart
- 1997: Annelies De Meester
- 1998: Sandrine Hennart
- 1999: Sandrine Hennart
- 2000: Sandrine Hennart
- 2001: Sandra Swennen
- 2002: Chantal Brunner (NZL)
- 2003: Sandra Swennen
- 2004: Caroline Lahaye
- 2005: Jessica Van de Steene
- 2006: Tia Hellebaut

=== Triple jump ===
- 1991: Heidi Van Collie
- 1992: Jacqueline Muyls
- 1993: Karen Hambrook (GBR)
- 1994: Sandra Swennen
- 1995: Heidi Van Collie
- 1996: Sandra Swennen
- 1997: Sandra Swennen
- 1998: Sandra Swennen
- 1999: Sandra Swennen
- 2000: Sandra Swennen
- 2001: Sandra Swennen
- 2002: Sandra Swennen
- 2003: Sandra Swennen
- 2004: Jessica Van de Steene
- 2005: Jessica Van de Steene
- 2006: Jolien Van Brempt

=== Shot put ===
- 1960: Simone Saenen
- 1961: Simone Saenen
- 1962: Simone Saenen
- 1963: Hilde De Cort
- 1964: Hilde De Cort
- 1965: Simone Saenen
- 1966: Marcella Coremans
- 1967: Marcella Coremans
- 1968: Marcella Coremans
- 1969: Helga Deprez
- 1970: Helga Deprez
- 1971: Helga Deprez
- 1972: Genevieve Van Driessche
- 1973: Genevieve Van Driessche
- 1974: Helga Deprez
- 1975: Brigitte De Leeuw
- 1976: Brigitte De Leeuw
- 1977: Brigitte De Leeuw
- 1978: Brigitte De Leeuw
- 1979: Brigitte De Leeuw
- 1980: Brigitte De Leeuw
- 1981: Brigitte De Leeuw
- 1982: Brigitte De Leeuw
- 1983: Brigitte De Leeuw
- 1984: Brigitte De Leeuw
- 1985: Brigitte De Leeuw
- 1986: Marie-Paule Geldhof
- 1987: Brigitte De Leeuw
- 1988: Marie-Paule Geldhof
- 1989: Brigitte De Leeuw
- 1990: Brigitte De Leeuw
- 1991: Greet Meulemeester
- 1992: Greet Meulemeester
- 1993: Greet Meulemeester
- 1994: Greet Meulemeester
- 1995: Greet Meulemeester
- 1996: Greet Meulemeester
- 1997: Greet Meulemeester
- 1998: Greet Meulemeester
- 1999: Greet Meulemeester
- 2000: Veerle Blondeel
- 2001: Veerle Blondeel
- 2002: Sophie Verlinden
- 2003: Veerle Blondeel
- 2004: Veerle Blondeel
- 2005: Veerle Blondeel
- 2006: Veerle Blondeel

=== Discus throw ===
- 1960: Simone Saenen
- 1961: Simone Saenen
- 1962: Simone Saenen
- 1963: Rita Beyens
- 1964: Rita Beyens
- 1965: Simone Saenen
- 1966: Julia Heck
- 1967: Monique Goeffers
- 1968: Rita Beyens
- 1969: Maggy Wauters
- 1970: Maggy Wauters
- 1971: Maggy Wauters
- 1972: Maggy Wauters
- 1973: Maggy Wauters
- 1974: Maggy Wauters
- 1975: Maggy Wauters
- 1976: Maggy Wauters
- 1977: Maggy Wauters
- 1978: Maggy Wauters
- 1979: Rita Beyens
- 1980: Ingrid Engelen
- 1981: Marie-Paule Geldhof
- 1982: Marie-Paule Geldhof
- 1983: Marie-Paule Geldhof
- 1984: Ingrid Engelen
- 1985: Ingrid Engelen
- 1986: Ingrid Engelen
- 1987: Marie-Paule Geldhof
- 1988: Marie-Paule Geldhof
- 1989: Marie-Paule Geldhof
- 1990: Marie-Paule Geldhof
- 1991: Marie-Paule Geldhof
- 1992: Griet Maes
- 1993: Brigitte De Leeuw
- 1994: Marie-Paule Geldhof
- 1995: Veerle Blondeel
- 1996: Veerle Blondeel
- 1997: Veerle Blondeel
- 1998: Veerle Blondeel
- 1999: Veerle Blondeel
- 2000: Veerle Blondeel
- 2001: Veerle Blondeel
- 2002: Marie-Paule Geldhof
- 2003: Beatrice Faumuina (NZL)
- 2004: Veerle Blondeel
- 2005: Veerle Blondeel
- 2006: Veerle Blondeel

=== Hammer throw ===
- 1995: Laurence Reckelbus
- 1996: Laurence Reckelbus
- 1997: Jennifer Petit
- 1998: Jennifer Petit
- 1999: Jennifer Petit
- 2000: Hannelore Poissonnier
- 2001: Sarah Luyimi Mbala
- 2002: Sarah Luyimi Mbala
- 2003: Inès Boujanfa (TUN)
- 2004: Patricia Blondeel
- 2005: Irina Sustelo
- 2006: Irina Sustelo

=== Javelin throw ===
- 1960: Ghislaine D'Hollander
- 1961: Ghislaine D'Hollander
- 1962: Ghislaine D'Hollander
- 1963: Ghislaine D'Hollander
- 1964: Ghislaine D'Hollander
- 1965: Ghislaine D'Hollander
- 1966: Ghislaine D'Hollander
- 1967: Ghislaine D'Hollander
- 1968: Ghislaine D'Hollander
- 1969: Ghislaine D'Hollander
- 1970: Leen Wuyts
- 1971: Leen Wuyts
- 1972: Leen Wuyts
- 1973: Leen Wuyts
- 1974: Leen Wuyts
- 1975: Françoise Lheureux
- 1976: Françoise Lheureux
- 1977: Leen Wuyts
- 1978: Gaby Lebeau
- 1979: Gaby Lebeau
- 1980: Nicole Broeckx
- 1981: Gaby Lebeau
- 1982: Martine Florent
- 1983: Martine Florent
- 1984: Gaby Lebeau
- 1985: Martine Florent
- 1986: Martine Florent
- 1987: Martine Florent
- 1988: Martine Florent
- 1989: Martine Florent
- 1990: Martine Florent
- 1991: Ingrid Didden
- 1992: Isabelle Vermeiren
- 1993: Ingrid Didden
- 1994: Ingrid Didden
- 1995: Leen Wuyts
- 1996: Cindy Stas
- 1997: Cindy Stas
- 1998: Cecilia McIntosh (AUS)
- 1999: Cindy Stas
- 2000: Cindy Stas
- 2001: Heidi Marien
- 2002: Cindy Stas
- 2003: Cindy Stas
- 2004: Cindy Stas
- 2005: Cindy Stas
- 2006: Sofie Schoenmaekers

=== Pentathlon ===
- 1960: Jannine Knaepen
- 1961: Jannine Knaepen
- 1962: Therese Schueremans
- 1963: Roswitha Emonts-Gast
- 1964: Roswitha Emonts-Gast
- 1965: Hilde De Cort
- 1966: Rita Vanherck
- 1967: Roswitha Emonts-Gast
- 1968: Rita Vanherck
- 1969: Rita Vanherck
- 1970: Roswitha Emonts-Gast
- 1971: Roswitha Emonts-Gast
- 1972: Roswitha Emonts-Gast
- 1973: Martine Lambrecht
- 1974: Christiane Van Landschoot
- 1975: Christiane Van Landschoot
- 1976: Anne-Marie Pira
- 1977: Anne-Marie Pira
- 1978: Rosanne Corneille
- 1979: Anne-Marie Pira
- 1980: Marie-Christine Caron

=== Heptathlon ===
- 1981: Marie-Christine Caron
- 1982: Christiane Van Landschoot
- 1983: Christiane Van Landschoot
- 1984: Christiane Van Landschoot
- 1985: Marie-Christine Caron
- 1986: Jacqueline Hautenauve
- 1987: Jacqueline Hautenauve
- 1988: Jacqueline Hautenauve
- 1989: Ervjin Hilde
- 1990: Ingrid Didden
- 1991: Ingrid Didden
- 1992: Mélanie Moreels
- 1993: Ingrid Didden
- 1994: Annelies De Meester
- 1995: Sabine De Wachter
- 1996: Annelies De Meester
- 1997: Mélanie Moreels
- 1998: Annelies De Meester
- 1999: Tia Hellebaut
- 2000: Tia Hellebaut
- 2001: Joke Visser
- 2002: Tia Hellebaut
- 2003: Isabel Poelmans
- 2004: Sara Aerts
- 2005: Sara Aerts

=== 5000 metres walk ===
The race was held as a road event in 1977, 1997, 1998 and 2002.

- 1977: Christel Velghe
- 1978: Claudine Hoogstoel
- 1979: Claudine Hoogstoel
- 1980: Claudine Hoogstoel
- 1981: Claudine Hoogstoel
- 1982: Claudine Hoogstoel
- 1983: Claudine Hoogstoel
- 1984: Claudine Hoogstoel
- 1985: Claudine Hoogstoel
- 1986: Not held
- 1987: Not held
- 1988: Not held
- 1989: Not held
- 1990: Not held
- 1991: Not held
- 1992: Christa Ceulemans
- 1993: ?
- 1994: Christa Ceulemans
- 1995: Frieda De Wolf
- 1996: Christel Schenk
- 1997: Christel Schenk
- 1998: Christel Schenk
- 1999: Godelieve Hoogewijs
- 2000: Liesbet Desmet
- 2001: Liesbet Desmet
- 2002: Liesbet Desmet
- 2003: Liesbet Desmet
- 2004: Frieda De Wolf
- 2005: ?

=== 10,000 metres walk ===
The race was held as a road event from 1995 to 1997.

- 1986: Christel Schenk
- 1987: Sabine Desmet
- 1988: Christa Ceulemans
- 1989: Christa Ceulemans
- 1990: ?
- 1991: Christa Ceulemans
- 1992: ?
- 1993: ?
- 1994: ?
- 1995: Christel Schenk
- 1996: Christel Schenk
- 1997: Christel Schenk

=== 20 kilometres walk ===
- 2004: Frieda De Wolf

=== Cross country (long course) ===
- 1970: Marie-Claire Decroix
- 1971: Joske Van Santberghe
- 1972: Joske Van Santberghe
- 1973: Joske Van Santberghe
- 1974: Joske Van Santberghe
- 1975: Magda Ilands
- 1976: Viviane Van Emelen
- 1977: Marleen Mols
- 1978: Marleen Mols
- 1979: Francine Peeters
- 1980: Magda Ilands
- 1981: Marie-Christine Deurbroeck
- 1982: Magda Ilands
- 1983: Francine Peeters
- 1984: Francine Peeters
- 1985: Betty Van Steenbroek
- 1986: Corinne Debaets
- 1987: Véronique Collard
- 1988: Véronique Collard
- 1989: Véronique Collard
- 1990: Véronique Collard
- 1991: Lieve Slegers
- 1992: Lieve Slegers
- 1993: Véronique Collard
- 1994: Lieve Slegers
- 1995: Lieve Slegers
- 1996: Anne-Marie Danneels
- 1997: Anja Smolders
- 1998: Anja Smolders
- 1999: Anja Smolders
- 2000: Anja Smolders
- 2001: Anja Smolders
- 2002: Anja Smolders
- 2003: Fatiha Baouf
- 2004: Anja Smolders
- 2005: Mounia Aboulahcen
- 2006: Nathalie De Vos

=== Cross country (short course) ===
- 1992: Linda Berghman
- 1993: Laurence Roobaert
- 1994: Maria Byczkowska
- 1995: Els Van Collie
- 1996: Els Van Collie
- 1997: Els Verthé
- 1998: Els Van Collie
- 1999: Els Van Collie
- 2000: Véronique Collard
- 2001: Véronique Collard
- 2002: Véronique Collard
- 2003: Veerle Dejaeghere
- 2004: Mieke Geens
- 2005: Liesbeth Van de Velde
- 2006: Sylvie Verthé
