= Golden Spike (Belgium) =

Gouden Spike
- Native name: Gouden Spike
- Description: Athletics prize awarded to the best Belgian athletes and young talents of the year
- Country: Belgium

The Gouden Spike (English: Golden Spike) is the most important athletics prize in Belgium, first awarded in 1954.

Until 1987, the prize was alternated between track and field disciplines to the athlete with the best performance of the last two years among the athletes who never won the prize; because it was only possible to win the prize once. Since 1974, for the first time an award for female athletes was also added.

Since 1988 the best male and female athlete and also the best male and female Belgian young talent of the year are elected. From that year on, in the main categories there is also an award for the second and third place (respectively called Zilveren Spike (English: Silver Spike) and Bronzen Spike (English: Bronze Spike).

This Belgian athletics prize is not to be confused with the award given at the Gouden Spike competition held annually in Leiden, Netherlands.

== Winners ==
=== Athlete with best performance ===
Year	Winner (Male)	Winner (Female)
1954	Lucien De Muynck	not awarded
1955	Walter Herssens	not awarded
1956	Roger Moens	not awarded
1957	Henri Haest	not awarded
1958	Roger Verheuen	not awarded
1959	Edouard Szostak	not awarded
1960	Gaston Roelants	not awarded
1961	Georges Salmon	not awarded
1962	Aureel Vandendriessche	not awarded
1963	Paul Coppejans	not awarded
1964	Eugene Allonsius	not awarded
1965	Leo Mariën	not awarded
1966	André Dehertoghe	not awarded
1967	Roger Lespagnard	not awarded
1968	Willy Polleunis	not awarded
1969	Philippe Housiaux	not awarded
1970	Miel Puttemans	not awarded
1971	Freddy Herbrand	not awarded
1972	Karel Lismont	not awarded
1973	Régis Ghesquière	not awarded
1974	Marc Smet	Sonja Castelein
1975	Bruno Brokken	Hilde Van Dyck
1976	Ivo Van Damme	Bernadette Van Roy
1977	Patrick Desruelles & Elie Van Vlierberghe	Anne-Marie Pira
1978	Fons Brydenbach	Lea Alaerts
1979	Ronald Desruelles	Chris Soetewey
1980	Leon Schots	Magda Ilands
1981	Eddy Annys	Françoise Van Poelvoorde
1982	Alex Hagelsteens	Anne Michel
1983	Jean-Marc Jacques & Jan Van Hocht	Chris Van Landschoot
1984	William Van Dijck	Marie-Christine Deurbroeck
1985	Marc Borra	Jacqueline Hautenauve
1986	Vincent Rousseau	Lieve Slegers
1987	Didier Falise	Hilde Vervaet

=== Best athlete ===
Year	Winner (Male)	Winner (Female)	Talent (Male)	Talent (Female)
1988	William Van Dijck	Sylvia Dethier	Patrick Stevens	Ann Maenhout
1989	Godfried Dejonckheere	Véronique Collard	Gino Van Geyte	Anneke Matthijs
1990	Patrick Stevens	Lieve Slegers	Stefaan Allemeersch	Sandrine Hennart
1991	Godfried Dejonckheere	Sylvia Dethier	Yassin Guellet	Anja Smolders
1992	William Van Dijck	Lieve Slegers	Benjamin Leroy	Sabrina De Leeuw
1993	Vincent Rousseau	Sabrina De Leeuw	Nathan Kahan	Kathleen Van Hove
1994	Vincent Rousseau	Lieve Slegers	Erik Nijs	Annelies Demeester
1995	Patrick Stevens	Lieve Slegers	Sven Pieters	Kim Gevaert
1996	Patrick Stevens	Ann Mercken	Kjell Provost	Cindy Stas
1997	Mohammed Mourhit	Marleen Renders	Ben Quintelier	Ludivine Michel
1998	Jonathan N'Senga	Marleen Renders	Johan Kloek	Catherine Lallemand
1999	Mohammed Mourhit	Marleen Renders	Thibaut Duval & Hans Janssens	Veerle Dejaeghere
2000	Mohammed Mourhit	Veerle Dejaeghere	Matthieu Van Diest	Mieke Geens
2001	Mohammed Mourhit	Kim Gevaert	Kevin Rans	Sigrid Vanden Bempt
2002	Cédric Van Branteghem	Kim Gevaert	Michael Velter	Elfje Willemsen
2003	Cédric Van Branteghem	Kim Gevaert	Xavier De Baerdemaeker	Olivia Borlée
2004	Joeri Jansen	Kim Gevaert	Pieter Desmet	Lien Huyghebaert
2005	François Gourmet	Kim Gevaert	Frédéric Xhonneux	Eline Berings
2006	Kristof Beyens	Tia Hellebaut	Jonathan Borlée	Annelies Peetroons
2007	Hans Van Alphen	Kim Gevaert	Adrien Deghelt	Anne Zagré
2008	Kevin Borlée	Tia Hellebaut	Kevin Borlée	Hannelore Desmet
2009	Jonathan Borlée	Eline Berings	Jeroen D'hoedt & Thomas Van der Plaetsen	Lindsey De Grande
2010	Kevin Borlée	Svetlana Bolshakova	Julien Watrin	Hanne Van Hessche
2011	Kevin Borlée	Élodie Ouédraogo	Stef Vanhaeren	Marjolein Lindemans
2012	Hans Van Alphen	Tia Hellebaut	Dario De Borger	Nafissatou Thiam
2013	Jonathan Borlée	Nafissatou Thiam	Pieter-Jan Hannes	Justien Grillet
2014	Thomas Van der Plaetsen	Nafissatou Thiam	Mathias Broothaerts	Chloë Beaucarne
2015	Philip Milanov	Nafissatou Thiam	Isaac Kimeli	Louise Carton
2016	Thomas Van der Plaetsen	Nafissatou Thiam	Ben Broeders	Renée Eykens
2017	Philip Milanov	Nafissatou Thiam	Simon Debognies	Hanne Maudens
2018	Koen Naert	Nafissatou Thiam	Jonathan Sacoor	Elise Vanderelst
2019	Bashir Abdi	Nafissatou Thiam	Thomas Carmoy	Paulien Couckuyt
2020	not awarded due to COVID-19			
2021	Bashir Abdi	Nafissatou Thiam	Jente Hauttekeette	Rani Rosius
2022	Bashir Abdi	Nafissatou Thiam	Mimoun Abdoul Wahab	Helena Ponette
2023	Bashir Abdi	Cynthia Bolingo	Clément Labar	Delphine Nkansa
