= Lotto Cross Cup de Hannut =

- Date: January/February
- Location: Hannut, Belgium
- Event type: Cross country
- Distance: 8 km for men & women
- Website: Lotto Cross Cup

The Lotto Cross Cup de Hannut is an annual cross country running competition that takes place in Hannut in the Belgian province of Liège. It holds permit meeting status from the European Athletic Association and attracts top athletes from Europe and Africa.

Typically held in January or February, the competition was created as a men's only event in 1941 and in its first decade a number of Belgian champions competed, including Gaston Reiff and Marcel Vandewattyne. It became increasingly international in nature and the 1950s saw Olympic medallists top the podium, such as Derek Ibbotson, Gordon Pirie and Franjo Mihalić. Despite the growth of foreign competition, Gaston Roelants (the 1964 Olympic steeplechase champion) was dominant at the competition in the 1960s and two more Belgian Olympians, Emiel Puttemans and Vincent Rousseau, extended the national-level success from the mid-1970s through to the 1990s. A women's race was introduced in 1977 and attracted high level foreign competition from 1990 onwards.

The quality of the competition at the race declined in the 1990s, but this trend was reversed when it became part of the Lotto Cross Cup series of Belgian races, which also includes an international meeting in Brussels. Having been held every year since 1941, bar 1945–1946, the Lotto Cross Cup de Hannut is one of the longest running competitions of its type in Belgium. Since 2000, the senior races have seen an increase in participation from (and victories by) Kenyan and Ethiopian runners in both the men's and women's sections.

The event currently holds four principal races each year: a men's race of 10.5 km, a women's race of 6 km, a junior men's race of 6.5 km, and a junior women's race of 4.5 km. There are also a series of younger age-category races, masters races for older runners. Aside from these, there are two further recreational events bearing the names of top Belgian runners of the past: the "5 km Véronique Collard" for women and the "10 km Leon Schots" for men. The courses for the competition take place on a series of three loops of vary lengths, which are set in the grounds surrounding the Stade Lucien Gustin (the stadium of the local athletics club FC Hannut Athlétisme). It is usually a flat and grassy course, although occasionally muddy in wet weather. The current race director is Jos Van Roy.

== Past senior race winners ==
=== Early men's race ===
Edition	Year	Men's winner	Time (m:s)
1st	1941	P Willems (BEL)	
2nd	1942	Eduard Schroeven (BEL)	
3rd	1943	Gaston Reiff (BEL)	
4th	1944	Eduard Schroeven (BEL)	
Not held due to World War II
5th	1947	Gaston Reiff (BEL)	
6th	1948	Emile Renson (BEL)	
7th	1949	Raphaël Pujazon (FRA)	
8th	1950	Lucien Theys (BEL)	
9th	1951	Marcel Vandewattyne (BEL)	34:02
10th	1952	Marcel Vandewattyne (BEL)	
11th	1953	Marcel Vandewattyne (BEL)	
12th	1954	Ken Norris (GBR)	
13th	1955	Gordon Pirie (GBR)	43:05
14th	1956	Derek Ibbotson (GBR)	
15th	1957	Ken Norris (GBR)	36:29
16th	1958	Franjo Mihalić (YUG)	33:52.8
17th	1959	Marcel Vandewattyne (BEL)	32:38
18th	1960	Hedwig Leenaert (BEL)	35:51
19th	1961	Rhadi Ben Abdesselam (FRA)	39:27
20th	1962	Gaston Roelants (BEL)	37:48.2
21st	1963	Tim Johnston (GBR)	32:07.7
22nd	1964	Gaston Roelants (BEL)	32:41.2
23rd	1965	Gaston Roelants (BEL)	31:49.0
24th	1966	Gaston Roelants (BEL)	32:20
25th	1967	Gaston Roelants (BEL)	26:38.4
26th	1968	Lachlan Stewart (GBR)	27:08
27th	1969	Gaston Roelants (BEL)	27:25
28th	1970	René Goris (BEL)	26:56
29th	1971	Willy Polleunis (BEL)	
30th	1972	Gaston Roelants (BEL)	
31st	1973	Emiel Puttemans (BEL)	24:10
32nd	1974	Emiel Puttemans (BEL)	24:04
33rd	1975	Emiel Puttemans (BEL)	24:33
34th	1976	Eddy Van Mullem (BEL)	28:13

=== Men's and women's race ===
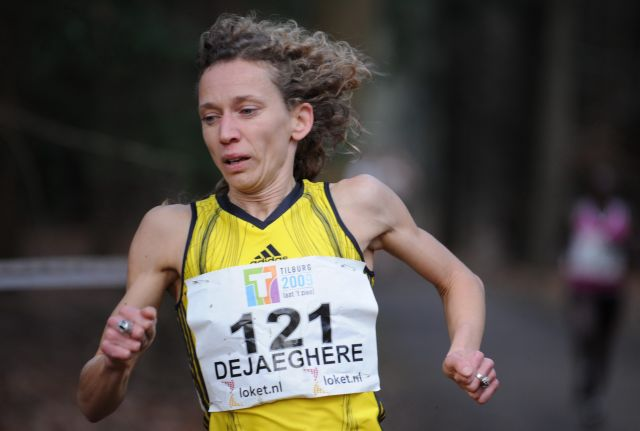
Belgium's Veerle Dejaeghere was the women's winner in 2000.

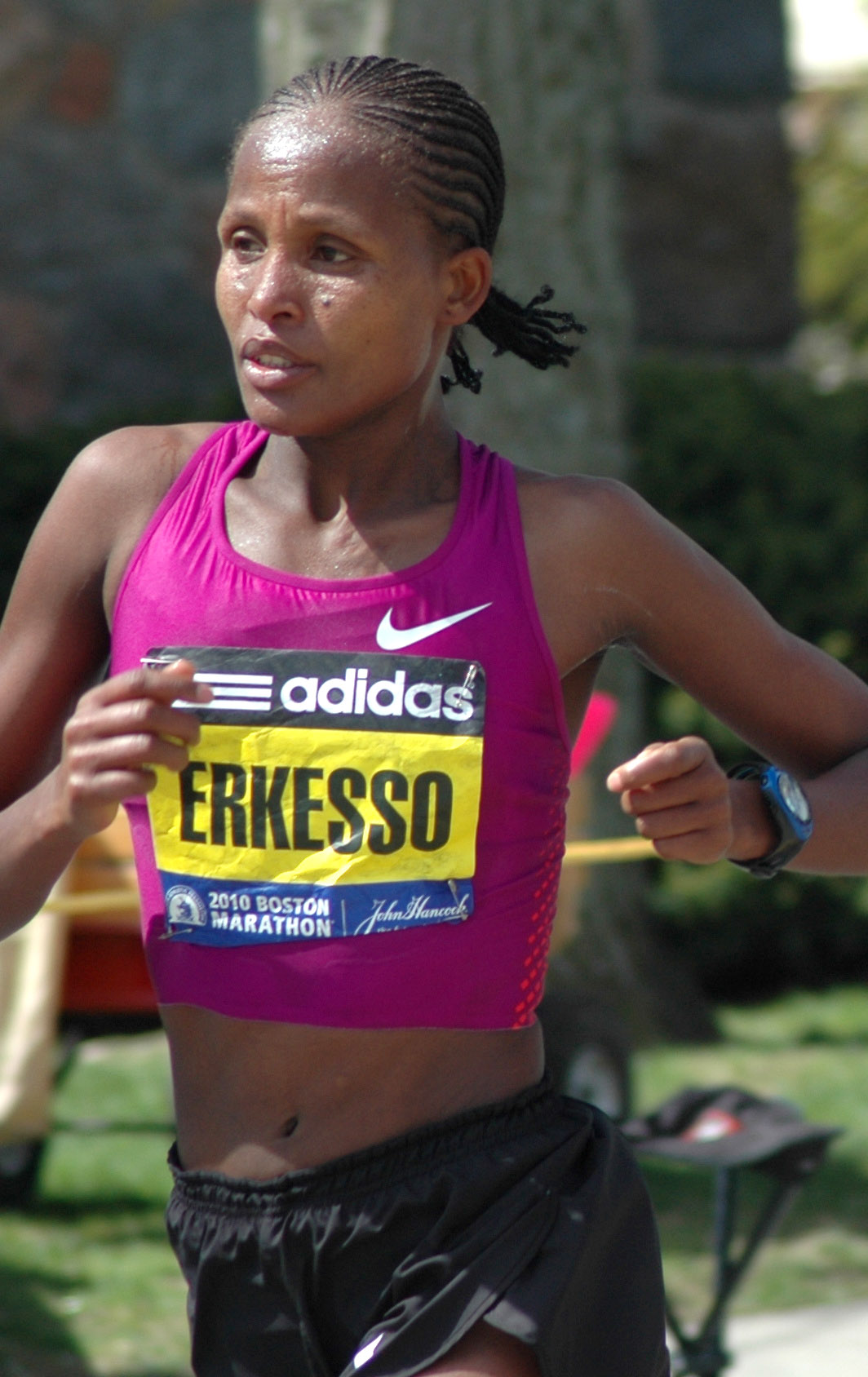
Teyba Erkesso of Ethiopia won in 2004.

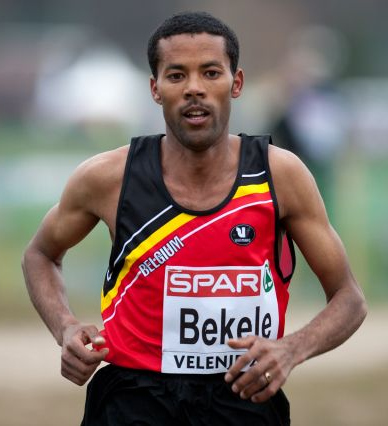
Atelaw Yeshetela of Belgium won in 2011 and went on to win the European title.

Edition	Year	Men's winner	Time (m:s)	Women's winner	Time (m:s)
35th	1977	Detlef Uhlemann (FRG)	21:22	Sonja Castelein (BEL)	
36th	1978	Valdur Koha (FRG)		?	
37th	1979	Alex Hagelsteens (BEL)		Lucienne Michaux (BEL)	
38th	1980	Fernando Mamede (POR)	26:23.3	Maria Steels (BEL)	
39th	1981	Léon Schots (BEL)		Véronique Collard (BEL)	
40th	1982	Jacques Boxberger (FRA)		?	
Not held in 1983 as fixture moved from November to February^{†}
41st	1984	Eddy De Pauw (BEL)	35:06.1	Francine Peeters (BEL)	
42nd	1985	Nathaniel Muir (GBR)		Betty Van Steenbroeck (BEL)	
43rd	1986	Vincent Rousseau (BEL)		Betty Van Steenbroeck (BEL)	
44th	1987	Roger Hackney (GBR)	39:29	Ria Van Landeghem (BEL)	17:35
45th	1988	Vincent Rousseau (BEL)		Véronique Collard (BEL)	
46th	1989	António Pinto (POR)	32:12	Marleen Renders (BEL)	21:06.0
47th	1990	Richard Nerurkar (GBR)	33:39	Véronique Collard (BEL)	20:01
48th	1991	Vincent Rousseau (BEL)		Marcianne Mukamurenzi (RWA)	
49th	1992	Vincent Rousseau (BEL)	27:35	Lieve Slegers (BEL)	16:54
50th	1993	Vincent Rousseau (BEL)		Ingrid Delagrange (BEL)	
51st	1994	Ruddy Walem (BEL)		Ingrid Delagrange (BEL)	
52nd	1995	Laban Chege (KEN)		Selina Chirchir (KEN)	
53rd	1996	Benoît Zwierzchiewski (FRA)	34:12	Elena Fidatov (ROM)	19:34
54th	1997	Mohammed Mourhit (BEL)	35:15	Getenesh Urge (ETH)	20:22
55th	1998	Mohammed Mourhit (BEL)	29:56	Elena Fidatov (ROM)	18:38
56th	1999	Ovidiu Tat (ROM)	33:12	Anja Smolders (BEL)	18:45
57th	2000	Tom Compernolle (BEL)	33:44	Veerle Dejaeghere (BEL)	19:17
58th	2001	Tom Van Hooste (BEL)	36:31	Anja Smolders (BEL)	19:29
59th	2002	Shadrack Kosgei (KEN)	36:49	Liz Yelling (GBR)	19:59
60th	2003	Shadrack Kosgei (KEN)	37:56	Lenah Cheruiyot (KEN)	20:24
61st	2004	Wilson Chemweno (KEN)	35:15	Teyba Erkesso (ETH)	18:46
62nd	2005	Luke Kipkosgei (KEN)	34:53	Benita Johnson (AUS)	18:34
63rd	2006	Mike Kigen (KEN)	32:51	Girma Chaltu (ETH)	17:49
64th	2007	Simon Arusei (KEN)	35:11	Florence Kiplagat (KEN)	18:53
65th	2008	Leonard Komon (KEN)	33:42	Linet Masai (KEN)	18:09
66th	2009	Dino Sefir (ETH)	32:57	Margaret Muriuki (KEN)	18:15
67th	2010	Onèsphore Nkunzimana (BDI)	31:06	Almensh Belete (ETH)	19:25
68th	2011	Atelaw Yeshetela (BEL)	32:17	Gemma Steel (GBR)	19:58
69th	2012	Conseslus Kipruto (KEN)	31:22	Valentine Kipketer (KEN)	21:17
70th	2013	Aweke Ayalew (BHR)	30:16	Sofia Assefa (ETH)	20:40
71st	2014	Titus Mbishei (KEN)	26:43	Birtukan Adamu (ETH)	20:16
72nd	2015	Dame Tasama (ETH)	32:52	Louise Carton (BEL)	22:04
73rd	2016	Dame Tasama (ETH)	28:27	Birtukan Fente (ETH)	18:53
74th	2017	Andy Vernon (GBR)	26:54	Birtukan Adamu (ETH)	20:17
75th	2018	Soufiane Bouchikhi (BEL)	29:11	Birtukan Adamu (ETH)	22:02
76th	2019	Thomas Ayeko (UGA)	25:27	Anna Gosk (POL)	19:30
77th	2020	Samuel Fitwi (GER)	30:07	Anna Gosk (POL)	23:27
78th	2022	Samuel Fitwi (GER)	28:51	Peruth Chemutai (UGA)	20:43
79th	2023	Yann Schrub (FRA)	28:29	Rahel Daniel (ERI)	28:41
80th	2024	Yves Nimubona (RWA)	28:29	Edinah Jebitok (KEN)	31:01
81st	2025	Rogers Kibet (UGA)	27:03	Sheila Jebet (KEN)	31:01
82nd	2026	Keneth Kiprop (UGA)	24:21	Jana Van Lent (BEL)	27:30

- Note that times are not comparable due to the variance of the race distance over the competition's history (from 7 km up to 14 km) and the effects of weather conditions.
- ^{†} Note: the event was held in February between 1941 and 1975. Held once in March in 1976, it was rescheduled for November from 1978 to 1982. It reverted to its February timing in 1984, skipping 1983 altogether. It has been mostly held in late January since 1993.
