= Desruelles =

Desruelles is a French surname. Notable people with the surname include:

- Félix-Alexandre Desruelles (1865–1943), French sculptor
- Patrick Desruelles (born 1957), Belgian pole vaulter
- Ronald Desruelles (1955–2015), Belgian long jumper and athlete
