= 1971 European Athletics Indoor Championships – Men's long jump =

The men's long jump event at the 1971 European Athletics Indoor Championships was held on 14 March in Sofia.

== Results ==
Rank	Name	Nationality	#1	#2	#3	#4	#5	#6	Result	Notes
1st place, gold medalist(s)	Hans Baumgartner	West Germany	7.43	7.91	8.00	8.12			8.12	NR
2nd place, silver medalist(s)	Igor Ter-Ovanesyan	Soviet Union		7.91					7.91	
3rd place, bronze medalist(s)	Vasile Sărucan	Romania							7.88	NR
4	Valeriu Jurcă	Romania							7.72	
5	Philippe Housiaux	Belgium							7.70	
6	Andreas Gloerfeld	West Germany							7.70	
7	Jan Kobuszewski	Poland							7.66	
8	Jaroslav Brož	Czechoslovakia							7.66	
9	Alan Lerwill	Great Britain							7.61	
10	Mikhail Bariban	Soviet Union							7.58	
11	Valeriy Podluzhniy	Soviet Union							7.54	
12	Kari Palmen	Finland							7.51	
13	Georgi Marin	Bulgaria							7.51	
14	Jesper Tørring	Denmark							7.46	
15	Milan Spasojević	Yugoslavia							7.23	
16	Salih Mercan	Turkey							6.98	
17	Henrik Kalocsai	Hungary							5.67	
