= Athletics at the 1976 Summer Olympics – Women's 1500 metres =

Women's 1500 metres at the Games of the XXI Olympiad
- Venue: Olympic Stadium
- Date: 28–30 July 1976
- Competitors: 36 from 19 nations
- Winning time: 4:05.48

Medalists
1st place, gold medalist(s)		Tatyana Kazankina	Soviet Union
2nd place, silver medalist(s)		Gunhild Hoffmeister	East Germany
3rd place, bronze medalist(s)		Ulrike Bruns	East Germany

The Women's 1500 metres competition at the 1976 Summer Olympics in Montreal, Quebec, Canada was held at the Olympic Stadium on 26–30 July.

== Competition format ==
The Women's 1500m competition consisted of heats (Round 1), Semifinals and a Final. The four fastest competitors from each race in the heats plus the next two fastest overall qualified for the Semifinals. The four fastest competitors from each of the Semifinal races plus the next fastest overall advanced to the Final.

== Records ==
Prior to the competition, the existing World and Olympic records were as follows.

World record	Tatyana Kazankina (URS)	3:56.0	Podolsk, Soviet Union	28 June 1976
Olympic record	Lyudmila Bragina (URS)	4:01.4	Munich, West Germany	9 September 1972

== Results ==
=== Round 1 ===
Qual. rule: first 4 of each heat (Q) plus the next two fastest times (q) qualified.

==== Heat 1 ====
Rank	Athlete	Nation	Time	Notes
1	Gabriella Dorio	Italy	4:10.84	Q
2	Raisa Smekhnova	Soviet Union	4:10.88	Q
3	Jan Merrill	United States	4:10.92	Q
4	Mary Stewart	Great Britain	4:11.10	Q
5	Maricica Puică	Romania	4:12.62	
6	Rositsa Pekhlivanova	Bulgaria	4:13.11	
7	Judy Amoore	Australia	4:14.22	
8	Bernadette Van Roy	Belgium	4:16.27	
9	Magdolna Lázár	Hungary	4:23.30	
—N/a	Maria Ritter	Liechtenstein	DNS	

==== Heat 2 ====
Rank	Athlete	Nation	Time	Notes
1	Lyudmila Bragina	Soviet Union	4:07.11	Q
2	Christiane Wartenberg	East Germany	4:07.13	Q
3	Nina Holmén	Finland	4:07.14	Q
4	Grete Waitz	Norway	4:07.20	Q
5	Ellen Wellmann	West Germany	4:07.20	q
6	Francie Larrieu Smith	United States	4:07.21	q
7	Dianne Rodger	New Zealand	4:12.81	
8	Thelma Wright	Canada	4:15.23	
9	Ndew Niang	Senegal	4:44.64	

==== Heat 3 ====
Rank	Athlete	Nation	Time	Notes
1	Ulrike Bruns	East Germany	4:11.62	Q
2	Tatyana Kazankina	Soviet Union	4:12.10	Q
3	Vesela Yatsinska	Bulgaria	4:12.72	Q
4	Sonja Castelein	Belgium	4:12.95	Q
5	Penny Yule	Great Britain	4:13.36	
6	Ileana Silai	Romania	4:13.61	
7	Margherita Gargano	Italy	4:15.94	
8	Carmen Valero	Spain	4:17.65	
9	Penny Werthner	Canada	4:18.19	

==== Heat 4 ====
Rank	Athlete	Nation	Time	Notes
1	Brigitte Kraus	West Germany	4:07.79	Q
2	Gunhild Hoffmeister	East Germany	4:08.23	Q
3	Natalia Mărăşescu	Romania	4:08.31	Q
4	Nikolina Shtereva	Bulgaria	4:08.38	Q
5	Mary Tracey-Purcell	Ireland	4:08.63	
6	Cyndy Poor	United States	4:08.89	
7	Anne Audain	New Zealand	4:10.68	
8	Silvana Cruciata	Italy	4:16.78	
9	Lilja Guðmundsdóttir	Iceland	4:20.27	

=== Semifinals ===
==== Heat 1 ====
Rank	Athlete	Nation	Time	Notes
1	Ulrike Bruns	East Germany	4:02.13	Q
2	Nikolina Shtereva	Bulgaria	4:02.33	Q
3	Lyudmila Bragina	Soviet Union	4:02.41	Q
4	Gunhild Hoffmeister	East Germany	4:02.45	Q
5	Jan Merrill	United States	4:02.61	q
6	Raisa Smekhnova	Soviet Union	4:03.20	
7	Brigitte Kraus	West Germany	4:04.21	
8	Grete Waitz	Norway	4:04.80	
9	Sonja Castelein	Belgium	4:13.46	

==== Heat 2 ====
Rank	Athlete	Nation	Time	Notes
1	Tatyana Kazankina	Soviet Union	4:07.37	Q
2	Nina Holmén	Finland	4:07.53	Q
3	Ellen Wellmann	West Germany	4:07.54	Q
4	Gabriella Dorio	Italy	4:07.61	Q
5	Mary Stewart	Great Britain	4:07.65	
6	Vesela Yatsinska	Bulgaria	4:07.89	
7	Natalia Mărăşescu	Romania	4:07.92	
8	Christiane Wartenberg	East Germany	4:08.28	
9	Francie Larrieu Smith	United States	4:09.07	

=== Final ===
Rank	Athlete	Nation	Time	Notes
1st place, gold medalist(s)	Tatyana Kazankina	Soviet Union	4:05.48	
2nd place, silver medalist(s)	Gunhild Hoffmeister	East Germany	4:06.02	
3rd place, bronze medalist(s)	Ulrike Bruns	East Germany	4:06.09	
4	Nikolina Shtereva	Bulgaria	4:06.57	
5	Lyudmila Bragina	Soviet Union	4:07.20	
6	Gabriella Dorio	Italy	4:07.27	
7	Ellen Wellmann	West Germany	4:07.91	
8	Jan Merrill	United States	4:08.54	
9	Nina Holmén	Finland	4:09.55	
