= Orietta Mancia =

Italian long-distance runner

Personal information
- Full name: Tullia Orietta Mancia
- National team: Italy (2 caps 1989-1965)
- Born: 29 October 1968 (age 57) Rome, Italy

Sport
- Country: Italy
- Sport: Athletics
- Events: Long-distance running; Cross country running
- Club: G.S. Forestale

Achievements and titles
- Personal bests: 1500 m: 4:19.25 (1988); 3000 m: 9:04.68 (1993); 5000 Mm: 15:37.59 (1989); 10,000 m: 34:37.33 (1998); Half marathon: 1:16:41 (1989)

Orietta Mancia (born 29 October 1968) is a former Italian female long-distance runner and cross-country runner who competed at individual senior level at the World Athletics Cross Country Championships (1991, 1992, 1995).

== Biography ==
Mancia won two national championships at individual senior level and was 5th in the final of 10,000 at the 1986 World Junior Championships.

== Achievements ==
Year	Competition	Venue	Position	Event	Time
1986	World Junior Championships	(Greece) Athens	5th	10,000 m	35:16.96
1991	Cross Internacional de la Constitución	(Spain) Alcobendas	1st	6 km	19:22
1995	World Military Cross Country Championships	(United States) Mayport	1st	5 km	17:14

== National titles ==
- Italian Athletics Championships
  - 10,000 m: 1990, 1992
