= Nelly Aerts =

Belgian marathon runner

Nelly Aerts (born 30 September 1962) is a Belgian former long-distance runner who competed in the marathon. She represented Belgium at the 1990 European Athletics Championships and won marathons in Rotterdam and Brussels. Her personal bests of 1:11:32 for the half marathon and 2:33:33 hours for the marathon are former national records.

She won the 1987 Rotterdam Marathon in a time of 2:41:24 hours, then won her first Belgian marathon title two months later. In September she broke the Belgian record with a winning run of 2:33:33 hours at the Brussels Marathon. She was invited to November's New York City Marathon and came tenth in a time of 2:38:18 hours.

Her second marathon season came in 1989. Aerts began the year with a Belgian record of 1:11:32 hours in the half marathon – a time that won her the women's race at the City-Pier-City Half Marathon. This record stood for five years, until it was beaten by Marleen Renders in 1994. She was third at the Paris Marathon in a near-personal best time of 2:33:58 hours and won a second title in Brussels, which was also the national championship race that year. Her last marathon outing that year was the Carpi Marathon in October and she again reached the podium, taking third place.

Aerts made three international appearances for Belgium: she was seventeenth in the marathon at the 1990 European Athletics Championships and competed at the IAAF World Cross Country Championships in 1989 and 1990.
