= Lilja Guðmundsdóttir =

Icelandic athlete

Personal information
- Nationality: Icelandic
- Born: 3 January 1955 (age 71)

Sport
- Sport: Middle-distance running
- Event: 800 metres

Lilja Guðmundsdóttir (born 3 January 1955) is an Icelandic middle-distance runner. She competed in the women's 800 metres and 1500 metres at the 1976 Summer Olympics.
