= Georges Salmon =

Belgian long jumper and hurdler (1933–2023)

Personal information
- Citizenship: Belgian
- Born: 1 June 1933
- Died: 8 November 2023 (aged 90)

Sport
- Sport: Athletics
- Event(s): Long jump Hurdling

Georges Salmon (1 June 1933 – 8 November 2023) was a Belgian long jumper and hurdler affiliated with RFC Liège Athlétisme. He once participated in the European Athletics Championships and ten times in the Belgian Athletics Championships, winning ten national titles in four different events.

== Biography ==
Born on 1 June 1933, Salmon was a five-time Belgian champion in long jump and set the national record on multiple occasions. His personal best, a jump of 7.63 meters, stood for six years until it was broken by Philippe Housiaux. He took part in the 1958 European Athletics Championships in Stockholm in long jump and 110 metres hurdles. He was Belgian champion in triple jump in 1952. In 1961, he won the Golden Spike. In 2003, he was awarded the Prix de l'éthique de la ville de Liège.

Georges Salmon died on 8 November 2023, at the age of 90.
