= 1986 World Junior Championships in Athletics – Women's 10,000 metres =

The women's 10,000 metres event at the 1986 World Junior Championships in Athletics was held in Athens, Greece, at Olympic Stadium on 18 July.

== Medalists ==
Gold	Kathrin Kley; East Germany
Silver	Norah Maraga; Kenya
Bronze	Marleen Renders; Belgium

== Results ==
=== Final ===
18 July

Rank	Name	Nationality	Time	Notes
1st place, gold medalist(s)	Kathrin Kley	East Germany	33:19.67	
2nd place, silver medalist(s)	Norah Maraga	Kenya	33:57.99	
3rd place, bronze medalist(s)	Marleen Renders	Belgium	33:59.36	
4	Nadezhda Tatarenkova	Soviet Union	34:28.35	
5	Orietta Mancia	Italy	35:16.96	
6	Olivia Grüner	West Germany	35:26.98	
7	Saori Terakoshi	Japan	35:54.43	
8	Jennifer Christiansen	Canada	36:23.46	
9	Anzhela Madrakhimova	Soviet Union	36:35.07	
10	María del Carmen Díaz	Mexico	36:53.83	
11	Alison Evanoff	Canada	37:13.69	
12	Lisa Rizzo	United States	38:38.16	
13	Rowena Monton	Philippines	40:53.50	
14	Gabi Morejón	Bolivia	44:51.32	
	Kim Widener	United States	DNF	

== Participation ==
According to an unofficial count, 15 athletes from 12 countries participated in the event.

- Belgium (1)
- Bolivia (1)
- Canada (2)
- East Germany (1)
- Italy (1)
- Japan (1)
- Kenya (1)
- Mexico (1)
- Philippines (1)
- Soviet Union (2)
- United States (2)
- West Germany (1)
