= Philippe Housiaux =

Belgian sprinter

Personal information
- Nationality: Belgian
- Born: Philippe Georges Albert Alexis Fernand Housiaux; 10 December 1947 (age 78) Ixelles, Belgium

Sport
- Events: 100 metres, 200 metres, long jump

Philippe Georges Albert Alexis Fernand Housiaux (born 10 December 1947) is a Belgian long jumper and sprinter. Housiaux competed at the 1968 Summer Olympics in the men's 100 metres, 200 metres, and long jump, though did not advance to the finals of any of the events. He became the 1969 Belgian National Champion in the long jump and was awarded the Golden Spike. He also qualified for the 1972 Summer Olympics but had to resign to take a law exam to complete his Doctor of Laws.

He has remained active in sport as a commentator for a broadcasting network. He had also led Brussels' bids for the 2004 Summer Olympics and 2005 World Championships in Athletics.

== Biography ==
Philippe Georges Albert Alexis Fernand Housiaux was born on 10 December 1947 in Ixelles, Belgium. Regionally, Housiaux had represented the Royal Excelsior Sports Club. He had competed at the 1968 Summer Olympics in Mexico City, Mexico as part of the Belgian team. He first competed in the preliminaries of the men's 100 metres on 13 October against six other athletes. He ran in a time of 10.94 seconds, ranked last in his heat, and did not advance further.

Housiaux competed in the preliminaries of the men's 200 metres two days later against six other athletes. He ran a time of 21.41 seconds and ranked fifth in his heat, and did not advance further. His final event was the men's long jump. In qualifications on 17 October, he jumped a distance of 7.44 metres and once again did not advance further. In the same year he had set a new personal best in the 100 metres with a time of 10.40 seconds.

Housiaux became the 1969 Belgian National Champion in the long jump and set a new personal best of 7.75 metres. He was also awarded the Golden Spike in the same year due to his performance. He competed in his first European Championships at the 1969 European Athletics Championships in Athens, Greece. In the men's long jump, he had jumped a distance of 7.07 metres in the qualifying round and did not advance further. The following year he competed at the 1970 European Athletics Indoor Championships in Vienna in the men's long jump. He had jumped a distance of 7.33 metres and placed sixteenth overall. He again competed at the European Athletics Indoor Championships the following year, doing so at the 1971 European Athletics Indoor Championships in the men's long jump. He jumped a distance of 7.70 metres and placed fifth overall. The same year he had broken his personal best in the 200 metres, running in a time of 21 seconds.

He had initially qualified for the 1972 Summer Olympics but had to resign to take a law exam to complete his Doctor of Laws. In his later years, he remained active in sport as an athletics commentator for VRT and the vice-chairman for the Belgian Olympic and Interfederal Committee. He also headed Brussels' bids for the 2004 Summer Olympics and 2005 World Championships in Athletics.
