= Raymond Van Dijck =

Belgian pole vaulter

Personal information
- Nationality: Belgian
- Born: 12 April 1935 Deurne, Belgium
- Died: 18 May 1997 (aged 62) Wommelgem, Belgium

Sport
- Sport: Athletics
- Event: Pole vault

Raymond Van Dijck (12 April 1935 – 18 May 1997) was a Belgian athlete. He competed in the men's pole vault at the 1960 Summer Olympics.
