= Maurice Peiren =

Belgian long-distance runner

Personal information
- Nationality: Belgian
- Born: 11 December 1937 Nieuwkapelle, Belgium
- Died: 6 January 2011 (aged 73)

Sport
- Sport: Long-distance running
- Event: Marathon

Maurice Peiren (28 December 1937 – 6 January 2011) was a Belgian long-distance runner. He competed in the marathon at the 1968 Summer Olympics.
