= Godfried Dejonckheere =

Belgian race walker

Godfried Dejonckheere (born 1 July 1952) is a retired Belgian race walker.

He was born in Roeselare and represented the club KKS Kortrijk. He finished 25th at the 1976 Olympic Games (20 km), tenth at the 1987 World Championships (50 km), 35th at the 1988 Olympic Games (20 km), and ninth at the 1991 World Championships (50 km). He was disqualified at the 1992 Olympic Games (50 km) and the 1993 World Championships (50 km).

He became Belgian champion 21 times. He was given the Golden Spike award in 1989 and 1991.
