= Marnix Verhegghe =

Belgian hammer thrower

Personal information
- Nationality: Belgian
- Born: 25 September 1961 (age 64) Belgium
- Height: 1.84 m (6 ft 1/2 in)

Sport
- Country: Belgium
- Sport: Athletics
- Event: Hammer throw
- Club: KAA Gent

Achievements and titles
- Personal best: Hammer throw: 71.76 m (1989)

Marnix Verhegghe (Palmanova, 25 September 1961) is a Belgian hammer thrower.

== Biography ==
He is the national record holder of the hammer throw.

== Achievements ==
Year	Competition	Venue	Position	Event	Performance	Notes
1987	European Cup (C Final)	(Greece) Athens	3rd	Hammer throw	68.34 m	

== National championships ==
- 2 wins in hammer throw (1984, 1988)
