= Maggy Wauters =

Belgian athlete

Personal information
- Nationality: Belgian
- Born: 5 September 1953 (age 72)

Sport
- Sport: Athletics
- Event: Discus throw

Maggy Wauters (born 5 September 1953) is a Belgian athlete. She competed in the women's discus throw at the 1972 Summer Olympics.
