= Guy Moreau =

Belgian high jumper

Personal information
- Nationality: Belgian
- Born: 15 October 1954 (age 71) Forest, Belgium

Sport
- Sport: Athletics
- Event: High jump

Guy Moreau (born 15 October 1954) is a Belgian athlete. He competed in the men's high jump at the 1976 Summer Olympics and the 1980 Summer Olympics.
