= Roswitha Emonts-Gast =

Belgian hurdler

Personal information
- Nationality: Belgian
- Born: 13 November 1944 (age 81) Schreiberhau, Germany

Sport
- Sport: Track and field
- Event: 80 metres hurdles

Roswitha Emonts-Gast (born 13 November 1944) is a Belgian hurdler. She competed in the women's 80 metres hurdles at the 1968 Summer Olympics.
