= Georges Schroeder =

Belgian athlete

Personal information
- Nationality: Belgian
- Born: 17 February 1950 (age 76) Sint-Truiden, Belgium

Sport
- Sport: Athletics
- Event(s): Shot put Discus

Georges Schroeder (born 17 February 1950) is a Belgian athlete. He competed in the men's shot put and the men's discus throw at the 1976 Summer Olympics.
