= Willy Polleunis =

Belgian long-distance runner

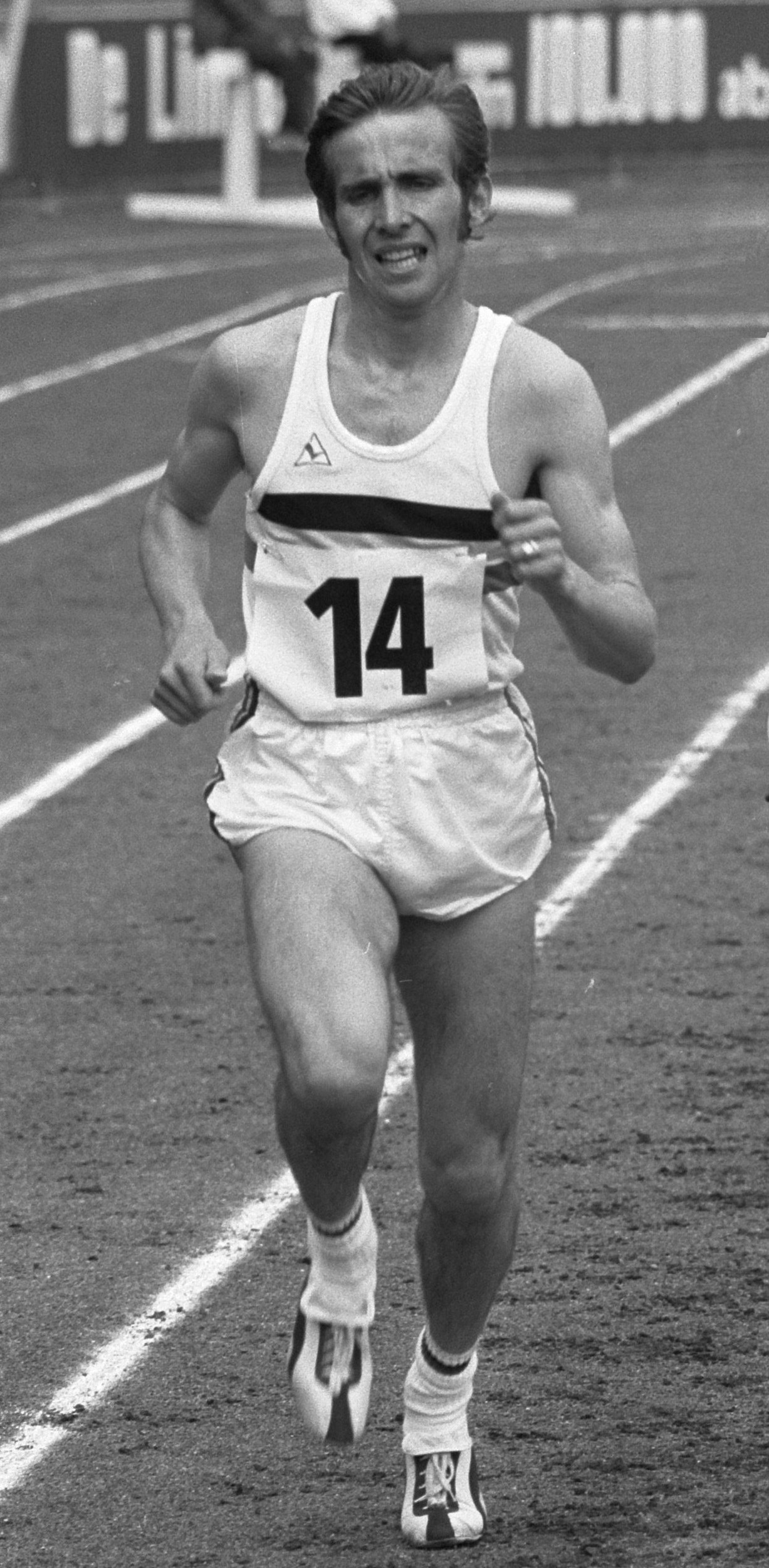
- Willy Polleunis in 1973

Personal information
- Nationality: Belgian
- Born: 27 December 1947 (age 78) Hasselt, Belgium
- Height: 1.68 m (5 ft 6 in)
- Weight: 54 kg (119 lb)

Sport
- Country: Belgium
- Sport: Long-distance running
- Club: F.C. Liège; DCLA
Medal record
Representing Belgium
European Indoor Championships
| Silver medal – second place | 1973 Rotterdam | 3000 m |

Willy Polleunis (born 27 December 1947) is a Belgian former long-distance runner who won the silver medal in the 3000 metres at the 1973 European Indoor Championships, behind his clubmate Emiel Puttemans. He also ran a world record on the 10 miles in 1972. He competed in the 5000 and 10000 metres events at the 1968, 1972 and 1976 Olympics with the best achievement of sixth place in the 5000 metres in 1976. At the start of the final lap, he was in tenth place, but he accelerated, and possibly ran the final lap even faster than the winner, Lasse Viren. Polleunis also won team gold medals at the 1973 and 1977 IAAF World Cross Country Championships, and a team silver in 1976.
