= Paul Coppejans =

Belgian pole vaulter (1933–2018)

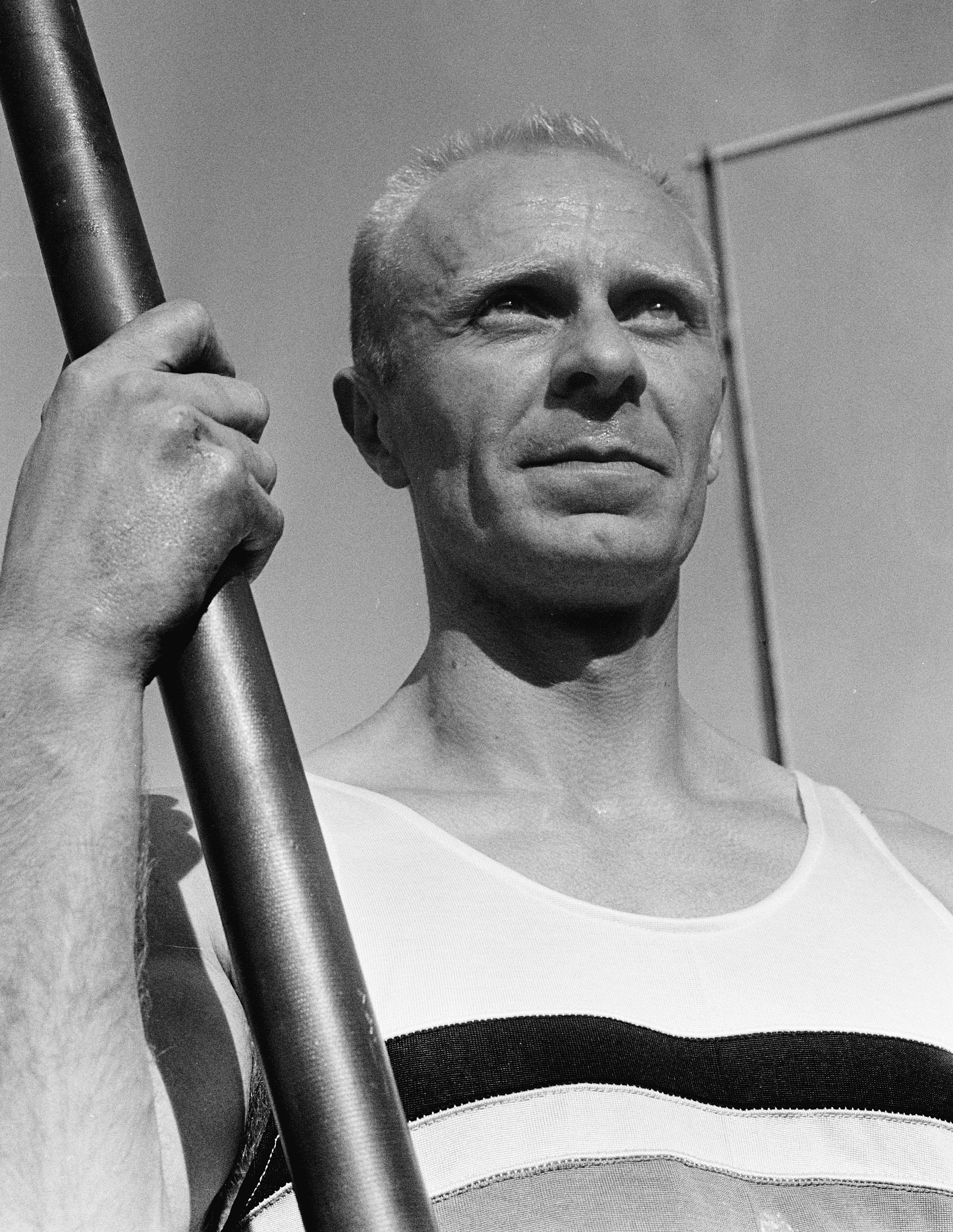
- Paul Coppejans in 1964

Personal information
- Nationality: Belgian
- Born: 28 September 1933 Ixelles, Brussels, Belgium
- Died: 13 August 2018 (aged 84) Ganshoren, Belgium
- Height: 183 cm (6 ft 0 in)
- Weight: 72 kg (159 lb)

Sport
- Sport: Pole vault
- Club: CA Schaerbeek

Paul Coppejans (28 September 1933 – 13 August 2018) was a Belgian pole vaulter. He competed at the 1964 Olympics and finished in 27th place with a jump of 4.20 m. His personal best is 4.73 m (1966).

Coppejans finished second behind Allah Ditta in the pole vault event at the British 1959 AAA Championships.
