= Freddy Herbrand =

Belgian decathlete

Freddy Herbrand (born 1 June 1944 Malmedy, Belgium) is a former Belgian decathlete.

Herbrand finished sixth at the 1972 Summer Olympics in Munich.

Herbrand became Belgian champion in the 110 metres hurdles in 1971 and 1972; high jump in 1964, 1965, 1967 and 1970; long jump in 1971 and 1972; triple jump in 1963, 1964 and 1965; and decathlon in 1968, 1970, 1971, and 1973.
