= Tom Compernolle =

Belgian middle-distance runner

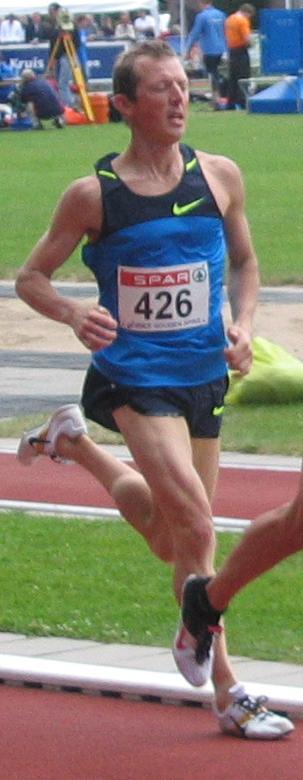
- Tom Compernolle in 2008

Personal information
- Born: 13 November 1975
- Died: 16 June 2008 (aged 32)

Tom Compernolle (13 November 1975 – 16 June 2008) was a Belgian runner, who specialized in the 5000 metres. He was born in Bruges.

Compernolle finished thirteenth at the 2002 European Championships and tenth at the 2006 European Championships. He also competed with less success at the 2001 World Championships, the 2004 Olympic Games as well as three editions of the World Cross Country Championships. He also competed in Belgium's domestic cross country series, the Lotto Cross Cup, and won the series in the 1999–2000 season.

He died on 16 June 2008 after an army truck, on which Compernolle was a passenger, crashed in Aartrijke, Belgium.

== Personal bests ==
- 1500 metres - 3:40.50 min (2005)
- Mile run - 4:06.21 min (2002)
- 3000 metres - 7:50.32 min (2002)
- 5000 metres - 13:14.75 min (2004)
- 10,000 metres - 29:15.96 min (2006)
