= Bernadette Van Roy =

Belgian middle-distance runner

Personal information
- Nationality: Belgian
- Born: 10 September 1948 (age 77)

Sport
- Sport: Middle-distance running
- Event: 1500 metres

Bernadette Van Roy (born 10 September 1948) is a Belgian middle-distance runner. She competed in the women's 1500 metres at the 1976 Summer Olympics. Van Roy also competed at the Praha European Championships in Praha and 6th IAAF World Cross Country Championships in Glasgow.
