= Léon Schots =

Belgian long-distance runner

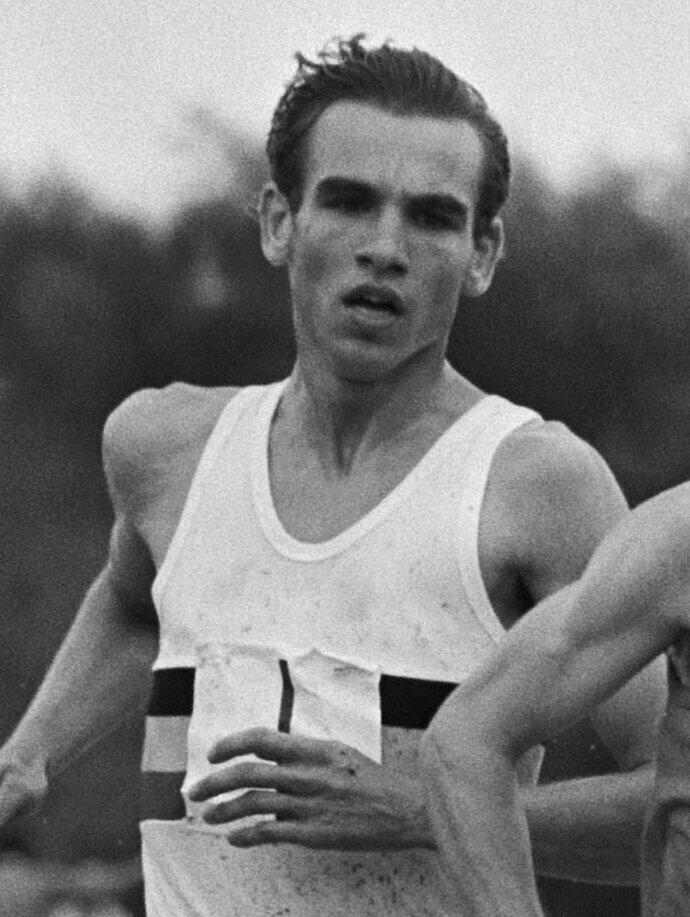
- Schots in 1974

Medal record

Men's athletics

Representing Belgium

IAAF World Cross Country Championships
Gold medal – first place	1977 Düsseldorf	Long race
Gold medal – first place	1977 Düsseldorf	Team race
Bronze medal – third place	1980 Paris	Team race

Léon Schots (born 11 June 1952) is a Belgian former long-distance runner who competed in track and cross country running competitions. His greatest achievement was a gold medal at the 1977 IAAF World Cross Country Championships, where he also led Belgium to the team title.

He was an eleven time national champion, with victories from 1500 metres to 10,000 metres on the track in addition to three Belgian cross country titles. He twice represented Belgium at the European Athletics Championships (1974 and 1978). He also placed fourth at the 1980 IAAF World Cross Country Championships, sharing in the team bronze, and was a three-time champion at the World Military Cross Country Championships.

== Career ==
Born in Halen, he began training with the R.F.C. de Liège running club and made his first appearance at the International Cross Country Championships in 1971, coming 32nd in the junior category. He returned the following year and placed sixteenth. At the 1973 IAAF World Cross Country Championships (the debut of the IAAF event) he won his first international medal in the form of the junior bronze medal.

In his first year as a senior athlete he won a double at the Belgian Championships, taking the 1500 metres and 5000 metres national titles. Later that year he competed at the 1974 European Athletics Championships in the longer event, but failed to finish the race. Schots repeated his Belgian double the following year. He endured a groin injury in early 1976, which interrupted his training. He hoped to make the team for the 1976 Olympic Games, but his injury and the presence of many other top quality Belgian long-distance runners meant he did not make the team. The 1970s was a historic high point for Belgian men's athletics, with Ivo Van Damme, Karel Lismont and Emiel Puttemans all winning Olympic medals and Erik De Beck becoming the world champion in cross country.

Despite missing the Olympics, he returned in top form in the next year and won the gold medal at the 1977 IAAF World Cross Country Championships, leading the Belgians to the team title in the process. He did not return to defend his title in 1978 but instead focused on the track, where he claimed a 5000/10,000 metres double at the national championships. He could only managed twelfth place in the latter event at the 1978 European Athletics Championships, however.

The 1979 IAAF World Cross Country Championships saw him attempt to win a second title and he held the lead briefly, before being overtaken by eventual winner John Treacy and ending up in fifth overall. Having entered as the national champion, he was the best of the Belgian team that year, which came fifth in the rankings. He retained his 10,000 m national title with a personal best run of 27:47.01 minutes. His career best came later that season in the IAAF Golden 10,000 m hosted at the Memorial Van Damme. Schots ran 27:41.34 minutes to place third behind Britain's Mike McLeod and Brendan Foster.

Schots performed well on the cross country circuit at the start of 1980. He came fourth at the 1980 IAAF World Cross Country Championships and led Belgium to the team bronze medals. He won the European Champion Clubs Cup Cross Country title that year, with R.F.C. Liège beating Sporting CP to the title. An Achilles injury that season again ruled him out of Olympic competition, as he missed the 1980 Moscow Games.

He only returned from injury after 1981 and he entered the 1982 IAAF World Cross Country Championships, but finished way down the field in 109th place. He did, however, manage to take the Belgian cross country and 10,000 metres titles that year. The Lotto Cross Cup debuted in Belgium that year and a series of good performances at Belgian cross country races saw him crowned the inaugural champion of the event. Schot's win at the 1983 Belgian Cross Country Championships was the last of the eleven national titles that he won over the course of his career. He attempted to make the team for the 1984 Los Angeles Olympics but injury again (this time his heel) thwarted his chances.

Among his other accolades were three short course titles at the World Military Cross Country Championships from 1978 to 1980. He won both the Campaccio and the Trofeo Alasport cross country races in 1983 and was a two-time winner of the Cinque Mulini (1979 and 1980).
