= Marc Smet =

Belgian long-distance runner

Personal information
- Nationality: Belgian
- Born: 5 February 1951 (age 75) Antwerp, Belgium

Sport
- Sport: Long-distance running
- Event: Marathon

Marc Smet (born 5 February 1951) is a retired Belgian long-distance runner. He competed in the marathon at the 1980 Summer Olympics.
