= Eugène Allonsius =

Belgian runner

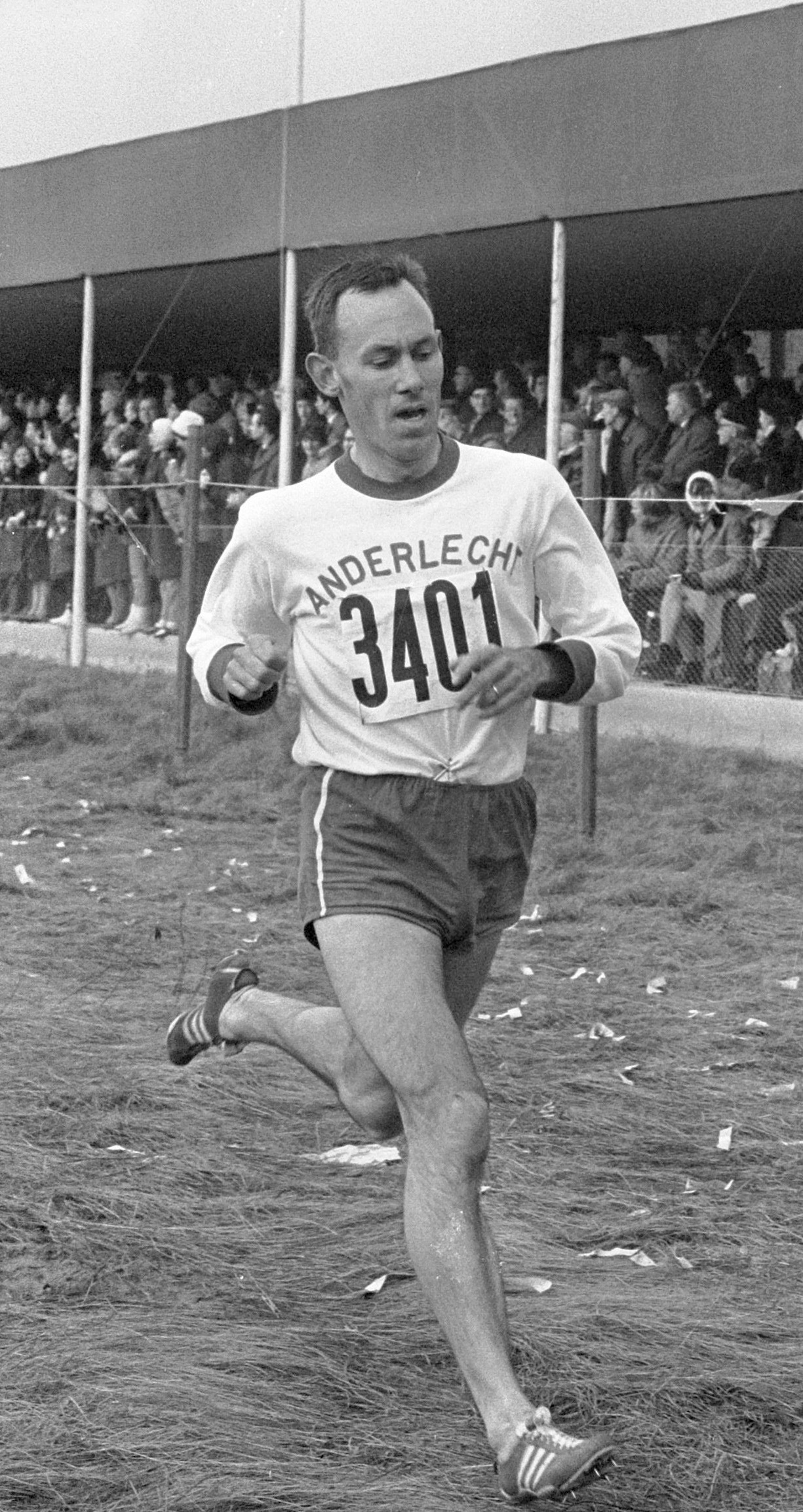
- Eugène Allonsius in 1966

Personal information
- Born: 12 December 1937 (age 88) Westdorpe, the Netherlands
- Height: 1.75 m (5 ft 9 in)
- Weight: 64 kg (141 lb)

Sport
- Sport: Middle- and long-distance running
- Club: SC Anderlechtois

Eugène Allonsius (born 12 December 1937) is a retired Belgian middle- and long-distance runner. He competed at the 1960 and 1964 Summer Olympics in the 1500 metres and 5000 metres events, but failed to reach the finals.

During his career Allonsius set five national records. He was a two-time Belgian champion in the 1500 m, won the 5000 m national title at nine times, and was also the 1968 national champion in the 10,000 metres. In addition to this, he competed as a guest athlete in the mile run at the 1966 South African championships and won that race.

He won the long race at the 1963 World Military Cross Country Championships. He was the victor at the 1966 Volkscross in Brussels. In 1966 he established Allonsius Sport, a company specializing in athletics training and supplies.
