= Michael Velter =

Belgian triple jumper

Michael Velter (born 20 March 1980) is a Belgian triple jumper.

He finished eighth at the 2005 European Indoor Championships. He also competed at the 2002 European Championships, the 2005 World Championships and the 2006 European Championships without reaching the final.

His personal best jump is 17.00 metres, achieved in May 2006 in Vilvoorde.

== Anti-doping rule violations ==
Velter tested positive for cannabis in 2006 and was subsequently handed a 3-month ban from sports. In 2011 he tested positive for cannabis again, and as it was his second anti-doping rule violation he received a 21-month ban.
