= Anne-Marie Pira =

Belgian heptathlete

Personal information
- Born: 6 February 1955 (age 71) Brussels, Belgium

Sport
- Sport: Track and field

Anne-Marie Pira (born 6 February 1955) is a retired Belgian heptathlete who excelled in the hurdles and jumping events.

She was born in Brussels. Pira became Belgian heptathlon champion in 1976, 1977 and 1979. She also won the 100 metres hurdles in 1975, 1976, 1977, 1979 and 1980; the high jump in 1976, 1977 and 1978; and the long jump in 1980.

In the high jump she finished 17th at the 1976 Olympic Games and competed at the 1978 European Championships without reaching the final. At the 1980 European Indoor Championships she finished eleventh in the long jump and competed in the 60 metres hurdles.

Her personal best high jump was 1.92 metres, achieved in 1977. She became Belgian Sportswoman of the Year in 1976 and 1977.
