= Christine Soetewey =

Belgian high jumper

Maria-Christine Soetewey (married Van Vlierberghe) (born 19 August 1957 in Kapellen) is a retired Belgian high jumper.

She finished ninth at the 1980 European Indoor Championships, twelfth at the 1980 Olympic Games, ninth at the 1982 European Indoor Championships, sixth at the 1983 European Indoor Championships, fifteenth at the 1983 World Championships, fourth at the 1984 European Indoor Championships, seventh at the 1985 World Indoor Games, and fourteenth at the 1987 European Indoor Championships. She also competed at the 1984 Olympic Games without reaching the final.

She became Belgian champion in 1979, 1980 and from 1982 to 1987.

Her personal best jump was 1.94 metres, achieved in July 1983 in Brussels.
