= Bruno Brokken =

Belgian high jumper

Bruno Brokken (born 9 May 1953 in Wilrijk) is a former Belgian high jumper. In 1976 he got the bronze medal at the European Indoor Championships with a jump of 2.19 metres.

== Biography ==
Bruno Brokken was the 1975 Belgian Sportsman of the year, ending the six consecutive titles for Eddy Merckx.

He tried his hand at other sports like soccer, basketball and especially judo before starting with athletics. He quit as a judoka when he was 15 years old with a brown belt when his father founded Wilrijk Atletiek Club, an athletics club. After trying his hand at the javelin, he switched to the high jump. A year later, he jumped over 2.04 metres using the straddle technique.

Only seventeen years old, he won the Belgian Championships in 1971. He finished in 8th place in the final of the 1974 European Championships in Athletics in Rome. 1975 saw him break the Belgian indoor record with 2.21 metres and the Belgian outdoor record with 2.24 metres. After winning bronze at the 1976 European Indoors, he was selected for the 1976 Summer Olympics in Montreal, but did not compete due to a last minute knee injury. An operation on his knee failed, and his sports career was over when he was only 23 years old.
