= Henri Haest =

Belgian hammer thrower

Personal information
- Nationality: Belgian
- Born: 2 November 1926
- Died: 20 June 1997 (aged 70)

Sport
- Sport: Athletics
- Event: Hammer throw

Henri Haest (2 November 1926 – 20 June 1997) was a Belgian athlete. He competed in the men's hammer throw at the 1952 Summer Olympics.
