= Jacqueline Hautenauve =

Belgian heptathlete

Jacqueline Hautenauve (born 11 July 1962) is a former Belgian heptathlete.

Born in Mons, Belgium, Jacqueline competed for her country at the 1988 Summer Olympics in Seoul, where she finished twentieth in the heptathlon.
