= Ria Van Landeghem =

Belgian runner (born 1957)

Maria ("Ria") Van Landeghem (born 19 July 1957) is a senior grand masters level female long-distance runner from Belgium, who competed in road race and marathons. She represented her native country at the 1984 Summer Olympics, finishing in 21st place in the women's marathon. She was born in Sint-Niklaas, East Flanders.

Van Landeghem is a one-time winner (1984) of the Stockholm Marathon. Her personal best is 2:28:11, winning the Twin Cities Marathon in 1988. She won the Boilermaker 15K Race that year.

In 2019, she set the World Masters Athletics record for 60-64 women for the marathon, timing a 3:02:05 (gantry to gantry, not gun time) to defeat Joan Benoit Samuelson, who started ahead and had beaten van Landeghem by seven seconds on the gun time, but was 16 seconds slower on the net time (3:02:21), at the BMW Berlin Marathon.

== Achievements ==
Year	Competition	Venue	Position	Event	Notes
Representing Belgium
1984	Stockholm Marathon	Stockholm, Sweden	1st	Marathon	2:34:13
1984	Olympic Games	Los Angeles, United States	21st	Marathon	2:37:11
1988	Twin Cities Marathon	Minneapolis, United States	1st	Marathon	2:28:11
