= Mohammed Mourhit =

Belgian athletics competitor

Personal information
- Born: 10 October 1970 (age 55)
Medal record
Men's Athletics
Representing Belgium
World Championships
Bronze medal – third place	1999 Seville	5000 m
World Indoor Championships
Silver medal – second place	2001 Lisbon	3000 m
World Cross Country Championships
Gold medal – first place	2000 Vilamoura	Long Course
Gold medal – first place	2001 Ostend	Long Course

Mohammed Mourhit (Arabic: محمد مُرحيت; born 10 October 1970 in Khouribga, Morocco) is a retired Belgian cross country, middle- and long-distance runner. He is also a former European 3000 m, 5000 m and 10000 m record holder. He won a bronze medal at the 1999 World Championships in the 5000 metres and a silver medal at the 2001 IAAF World Indoor Championships in the 3000 metres behind Hicham El Guerrouj. Mourhit was also a two-time winner of the IAAF World Cross Country Championships in the long course in 2000 and 2001. He also won the Lisbon Half Marathon in 1997.

He attained Belgian citizenship in 1997 by marriage. He competed in Lotto Cross Cup cross country meetings and won the domestic series in 1996–97 and 1997–98.

He was suspended for the use of EPO in 2002. He returned to competition in 2004, after seeing his ban reduced, and qualified for the World Championships in Helsinki 2005.

== Personal bests ==
- 3000 m – 7:26.62
- 5000 m – 12:49.71
- 10000 m – 26:52.30

== See also ==
- List of doping cases in athletics

Records
Preceded by António Pinto	Men's 10,000 m European Record Holder; 3 September 1999–3 June 2011	Succeeded by Mo Farah
Preceded by Dieter Baumann	Men's 5000 m European Record Holder; 26 August 2000 – 10 June 2021	Succeeded by Jakob Ingebrigtsen
Preceded by Isaac Viciosa	Men's 3000 m European Record Holder; 18 August 2000 –	Succeeded by Incumbent
Sporting positions
Preceded by Worku Bikila	Men's Zevenheuvelenloop Winner (15 km); 1999	Succeeded by Felix Limo
