= Sonja Castelein =

Belgian middle-distance runner

Personal information
- Nationality: Belgian
- Born: 10 June 1954 (age 72)

Sport
- Sport: Middle-distance running
- Event: 1500 metres

Sonja Castelein (born 10 June 1954) is a Belgian middle-distance runner. She competed in the women's 1500 metres at the 1976 Summer Olympics.
