= Véronique Collard =

Belgian long-distance runner

Personal information
- Nationality: Belgian
- Born: 9 June 1963 (age 63) Libramont-Chevigny, Province of Luxembourg, Belgium
- Home town: Brussels, Belgium

Sport
- Sport: Long-distance running
- Event: 10,000 metres

Véronique Collard (born 9 June 1963) is a Belgian long-distance runner. She competed in the women's 10,000 metres at the 1992 Summer Olympics.
