= Vincent Rousseau =

Belgian long-distance runner

Medal record
Men's athletics
Representing Belgium
European Championships
Silver medal – second place	1994 Helsinki	10,000 m
Half Marathon World Championships
Gold medal – first place	1993 Brussels	Half marathon

Vincent Rousseau (born 29 July 1962 in Mons, Hainaut) is a Belgian former long-distance runner, who competed in three consecutive Summer Olympics for his native country, starting in 1984.

== Career ==
In 1993, he had his biggest success by winning the IAAF World Half Marathon Championships in Brussels, the next year followed by the first place in the Rotterdam Marathon.

He had much success at the Lotto Cross Cup (Belgium's annual cross country running series) and was the overall season winner five times consecutively between 1983–88 and he earned a further three consecutive wins between 1990 and 1993.

Among his other wins on the circuit were the Dam tot Damloop in 1987, Eurocross in 1990, and the 20 km of Brussels in 1995.

== Awards ==
Rousseau was twice named Belgian Sportsman of the Year in 1985 and 1993.

He won the Belgian National Sports Merit Award in 1993.

== Achievements ==
Year	Competition	Venue	Position	Event	Notes
Representing Belgium
1986	European Championships	Stuttgart, West Germany	13th	5000 m	13:51.69
1987	World Championships	Rome, Italy	5th	5000 m	13:28.56
1990	European Championships	Split, Yugoslavia	21st (h)	5000 m	13:53.90
1993	Rotterdam Marathon	Rotterdam, Netherlands	5th	Marathon	2:13:09
1993	Reims Marathon	Reims, France	1st	Marathon	2:09:13
1994	Tokyo Marathon	Tokyo, Japan	2nd	Marathon	2:09:08
1994	European Championships	Helsinki, Finland	2nd	10,000 m	28:06.63
1994	Rotterdam Marathon	Rotterdam, Netherlands	1st	Marathon	2:07:51
1994	Brussels Marathon	Brussels, Belgium	1st	Marathon	2:12:59
1995	20 km of Brussels	Brussels, Belgium	1st	20 km	56:30
1995	Berlin Marathon	Berlin, Germany	2nd	Marathon	2:07:20
1996	London Marathon	London, United Kingdom	2nd	Marathon	2:10:26

== Personal bests ==
Event	Time	Date	Location
1500 metres	3:36.38	25 August 1985	Köln
Mile	3:54.69	14 August 1985	Hechtel
3000 metres	7:39.41	10 July 1989	Nice
5000 metres	13:10.99	10 July 1993	Oslo
10,000 metres	27:23.18	3 September 1993	Brussels
Half marathon	1:00:23	23 January 1994	Tokyo
Marathon	2:07:20	24 September 1995	Berlin
