= Patrick Desruelles =

Belgian pole vaulter

Personal information
- Nationality: Belgian
- Born: 24 April 1957 (age 69) Antwerp, Belgium
- Height: 1.88 m (6 ft 2 in)
- Weight: 78 kg (172 lb)

Sport
- Sport: Athletics
- Event: Pole vault
- Club: Beerschot VAC

Patrick Desruelles (born 24 April 1957) is a Belgian athlete. He competed in the men's pole vault at the 1980 Summer Olympics.

Desruelles finished second behind Mike Tully in the pole vault event at the British 1979 AAA Championships.

He is a brother of fellow former athlete, Ronald Desruelles.
