= Marleen Renders =

Belgian long-distance runner

Personal information
- Born: 24 December 1968 (age 57) Diest, Vlaams-Brabant, Belgium
- Height: 1.63 m (5 ft 4 in)
- Weight: 47 kg (104 lb; 7.4 st)

Sport
- Country: Belgium
- Club: AV Toekomst

Achievements and titles
- Olympic finals: 1988, 10,000 m, 21st 1996, Marathon, 25th 2000, Marathon, DNF
- World finals: 1987, 10,000 m, 12th 1994, Half Marathon, 8th 1995, 10,000 m, 17th 1995, Half Marathon, 13th 1997, 10,000 m, DNF; 1999, 10,000 m, 9th 2001, Marathon, 18th 2002, Half Marathon, 8th
- Personal bests: 3000 m: 9:03.64; 5000 m: 15:19.20; 10,000 m: 31:03.60; Half Marathon: 1:08:56; Marathon: 2:23:05
- Updated on 12-01-2013

Marleen Renders (born 24 December 1968, in Diest) is a retired female long-distance runner from Belgium, who represented her native country thrice at the Summer Olympics: in 1988, 1996 and 2000. In 1995 she won the Antwerp Marathon, in 1998 the Berlin Marathon, and she triumphed twice in the Paris Marathon in 2000 and 2002 (with a personal best of 2:23:05).

She was victorious at the Berlin Half Marathon in 1997 and 1998 and was the 2003 winner of the City-Pier-City Loop half marathon in the Hague. She won the 20 km of Brussels nine times consecutively from 1996 to 2004, which included a course record run of 1:07:46 in 2002.

Renders also competed in cross country running and won Belgium's 1996–97 Lotto Cross Cup series.

== Achievements ==
Year	Competition	Venue	Position	Event	Notes
Representing Belgium
1986	World Junior Championships	Athens, Greece	3rd	10,000m	33:59.36
1987	World Championships	Rome, Italy	12th	10,000 m	32:12.51
1988	Olympic Games	Seoul, South Korea	21st (h)	10,000 m	32:11.49 (h)
1994	European Championships	Helsinki, Finland	10th	10,000m	32:11.18
1995	Antwerp Marathon	Antwerp, Belgium	1st	Marathon	2:31:26
1995	Reims Marathon	Reims, France	3rd	Marathon	2:28:57
1996	Olympic Games	Atlanta, United States	25th	Marathon	2:36:27
1996	Berlin Marathon	Berlin, Germany	3rd	Marathon	2:27:42
1997	Rotterdam Marathon	Rotterdam, Netherlands	2nd	Marathon	2:25:56
1997	Berlin Marathon	Berlin, Germany	3rd	Marathon	2:26:18
1998	London Marathon	London, United Kingdom	4th	Marathon	2:27:30
1998	European Championships	Budapest, Hungary	5th	Marathon	2:29:43
1998	Berlin Marathon	Berlin, Germany	1st	Marathon	2:25:22
2000	Paris Marathon	Paris, France	1st	Marathon	2:23:43
2000	Olympic Games	Sydney, Australia	—	Marathon	DNF
2001	London Marathon	London, United Kingdom	11th	Marathon	2:28:31
2001	World Championships	Edmonton, Canada	18th	Marathon	2:33:25
2001	Amsterdam Marathon	Amsterdam, Netherlands	2nd	Marathon	2:29:31
2002	Paris Marathon	Paris, France	1st	Marathon	2:23:05
2002	European Championships	Munich, Germany	—	Marathon	DNF
2003	City-Pier-City Loop	The Hague, Netherlands	1st	Half Marathon	1:09:54
2003	Hamburg Marathon	Hamburg, Germany	4th	Marathon	2:28:31
2005	Frankfurt Marathon	Frankfurt, Germany	2nd	Marathon	2:26:26

Sporting positions
Preceded by (Kenya) Hellen Kimaiyo	Zevenheuvelenloop Women's Winner (15km); 1996	Succeeded by (Republic of Ireland) Catherina McKiernan
