= Emiel Puttemans =

Belgian runner

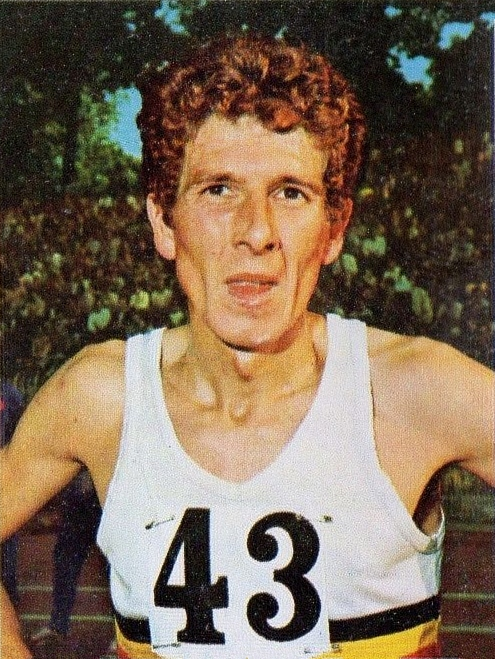

Personal information
- Born: 8 October 1947 (age 78) Vossem, Belgium
- Height: 1.75 m (5 ft 9 in)
- Weight: 68 kg (150 lb)

Sport
- Sport: Athletics
- Events: 1500 m – 10000 m, steeplechase
- Club: White Star AC/DC Leuven

Achievements and titles
- Personal bests: 3000 m – 7:39.2(1973); 3000 mS – 8:27.8 (1972); 5000 m – 13:13.0 (1972); 10000 m – 27:39.58 (1972)
Medal record
Representing Belgium
Olympic Games
Silver medal – second place	1972 Munich	10,000 m
European Indoor Championships
Gold medal – first place	1973 Rotterdam	3000 m
Gold medal – first place	1974 Gothenburg	3000 m
Silver medal – second place	1978 Milan	3000 m

Emiel Adrien "Miel" Puttemans (born 8 October 1947) is a Belgian former middle- and long-distance runner who set world records for 3000 metres (7 minutes 37.6 seconds) in 1972, for 2 miles (8 minutes 17.8 seconds) in 1971, for 5000 metres (13 minutes 13 seconds) in 1972, and 3 miles in 1972 (12:47.8). He won two European Indoor Championships titles in the 3000 m, in 1973 and 1974, and finished second in 1978.

At the 1972 Summer Olympics, Puttemans won a silver medal in the 10,000 metres and finished in fifth place in the 5000 metres. He then set a world record in the 5000 metres six days after the 1972 games. He also competed in these events at the 1968, 1976 and 1980 Games, but with less success.

In 1982, Puttemans won the first edition of the Rome Marathon.

Records
Preceded by Kipchoge Keino	Men's 3000 m World Record Holder; 14 September 1972 – 3 August 1974	Succeeded by Brendan Foster
Preceded by Lasse Virén	Men's 5000 m World Record Holder; 20 September 1972 – 5 July 1977	Succeeded by Dick Quax
Sporting positions
Preceded by Bernd Diessner	Men's 3000 m Best Year Performance; 1971–1972	Succeeded by Brendan Foster
Preceded by Dave Bedford	Men's 5000 m Best Year Performance; 1972–1973	Succeeded by Ben Jipcho
Preceded by Ben Jipcho	Men's 5000 m Best Year Performance; 1975	Succeeded by Dick Quax
