= Turtle Rock =

Turtle Rock may refer to:

- Turtle Rock, Irvine, California
- Turtle Rock Elementary School, an elementary school in southern Irvine, California
- Turtle Rock Light is a lighthouse on the Schuylkill River near Philadelphia, Pennsylvania
- Turtle Rock Studios, an independent video game developer founded in March 2002 by Michael Booth
- "Turtle Rock", a song by Béla Fleck and the Flecktones from their 1991 album Flight of the Cosmic Hippo
- Turtle Rock (Antarctica), a small island in Erebus Bay, Antarctica
