= Top of the World =

Top of the World may refer to the Roof of the World mountain ranges, or:

== Film ==
- The Top of the World (film), a lost 1925 American silent film directed by George Melford
- Top of the World (1955 film), an American film directed by Lewis R. Foster
- Top of the World (1997 film), an American film directed by Sidney J. Furie
- Top of the World (2026 film), an American documentary short direct by Julie Cohen and Betsy West

== Literature ==
- The Top of the World (novel), a 1920 novel by Ethel M. Dell
- Top of the World, a 1950 novel by Hans Ruesch

== Music ==
=== Albums ===
- Top of the World (Jimmy Sturr album), 2002
- Top of the World (Lynn Anderson album) or the title song (see below), 1973
- Top of the World (Slightly Stoopid album) or the title song, 2012

=== Songs ===
- "Top of the World" (Brandy song), 1998
- "Top of the World" (Bridgit Mendler song), 2013
- "Top of the World" (The Carpenters song), 1972; covered by Lynn Anderson, 1973
- "Top of the World" (The Cataracs song), 2011
- "Top of the World" (D'banj song), 2012
- "Top of the World" (Dixie Chicks song), 2004
- "Top of the World" (Khwezi song), 2015
- "Top of the World" (Kimbra song), 2017
- "Top of the World" (Rascalz song), 2000
- "Top of the World" (Tim McGraw song), 2015
- "Top of the World" (Van Halen song), 1991
- "Top of the World" (The Wildhearts song), 2003
- "Top of the World (Olé, Olé, Olé)", by Chumbawamba, 1998
- "Top of the World", by Ace Hood from Gutta, 2008
- "Top of the World", by The All-American Rejects from Move Along, 2006
- "Top of the World", by Ansol and Dyro, 2012
- "Top of the World", by Big Bang from Big Bang, 2009
- "Top of the World", by Diana Ross from Baby It's Me, 1977
- "Top of the World", by Five Finger Death Punch from And Justice for None, 2018
- "Top of the World", by Gotthard from Human Zoo, 2003
- "Top of the World", by Greek Fire, 2013
- "Top of the World", by James from Gold Mother, 1990
- "Top of the World", by Jill Johnson from Baby Blue Paper, 2008
- "Top of the World", by Mai Kuraki from Touch Me!, 2009
- "Top of the World", by Mandy Moore from the soundtrack for Stuart Little 2, 2002
- "Top of the World", by Mike Posner, 2013
- "Top of the World", by Owl City from The Midsummer Station, 2012
- "Top of the World", by Papa Roach from Who Do You Trust?, 2019
- "Top of the World", by Powerman 5000 from Transform, 2003
- "Top of the World", by the Pussycat Dolls from Doll Domination, 2008
- "Top of the World", by Raghav from The Phoenix, 2012
- "Top of the World", by Shawn Mendes from the Lyle, Lyle, Crocodile film soundtrack, 2022
- "Top of the World (The Glass Bead Game)", by Jon Anderson from In the City of Angels, 1988

=== Other ===
- Top of the World Tour, a 2003 Dixie Chicks concert tour
  - Top of the World Tour: Live, an album of the above tour
  - Top of the World Tour: Live (DVD), a video of the above tour
- Top of the World International Piano Competition, an event in Tromsø, Norway

== Places ==
- Top-of-the-World, Arizona, US, a census-designated place
- Top of the World, Tennessee, US, an unincorporated community
- Top of the World, another name for Alta Laguna Park in Laguna Beach, California, US
- Top of the World Reservoir, an artificial lake in Laguna Beach, California, US
- Top of the World Provincial Park, British Columbia, Canada

== Other uses ==
- Top of the World (ride), an amusement ride in Freizeit-Land Geiselwind, Germany
- Top of the World (Wadsworth), a 1943 painting by Edward Wadsworth
- Top of the World Highway, which connects Alaska, US, with The Yukon, Canada
- Top of the World Trade Center Observatories, a former observation deck in New York City, New York, US
- Top of the World Windpower Project, a proposed wind farm in Wyoming, US
- Top of the World, a restaurant in The Strat, Las Vegas, Nevada, US

== See also ==
- On Top of the World (disambiguation)
- Sitting on Top of the World (disambiguation)
- Roof of the World (disambiguation)
