= Temple Hill =

Temple Hill may refer to:

== Places ==
- Temple Hill, where the Oakland California Temple sits
- Temple Hill (County of Warner No. 5), a hill in County of Warner No. 5, Alberta, Canada
- Temple Hill (Hong Kong), a hill in Hong Kong (Chinese: 慈雲山)
- Temple Hill (Ireland), a 783 m hill in County Limerick, Ireland
- Temple Hill, Kent, a suburb of Dartford in England
- Temple Hill, Kentucky, a community in Barren County, southern Kentucky
- Temple Hill Cemetery, a cemetery in Geneseo, New York
- Temple Hill (Orange County, California), a named peak of the San Joaquin Hills
- Temple Hill, a hill in Cardston, Alberta, Canada, on which the Cardston Alberta Temple was constructed
- Temple Hill, a hill in Snowflake, Arizona, on which the Snowflake Arizona Temple was constructed
- Temple Hill, a place in Jones County, Iowa
- Temple Hill, a hill in Manti, Utah, on which the Manti Utah Temple was constructed
- Temple Hill, a hill in Provo, Utah, on which Brigham Young University was constructed
- Temple Hill, a nickname for the Oak Lawn estate in Washington, D.C.
- Temple Hill Japanese Internment Camp, the World War II site is in the present day Temple Hill township of Zhifu (Chefoo), in Yantai, Shandong, China (Chinese: 毓璜頂)
- Temple Hills, Maryland, an unincorporated area in Prince George's County, Maryland
- Temple Mount, a religious site in Jerusalem
- Tsz Wan Shan, a residential area of Hong Kong located at the base of Temple Hill, named after "Temple Hill" in Chinese (Chinese: 慈雲山)

== Other uses ==
- "Temple Hill", an Irish dance song incorporated into "Molly on the Shore" by Percy Aldridge Grainger
- Temple Hill (novel), a 2001 Forgotten Realms novel by Drew Karpyshyn
- Temple Hill Entertainment, a film production company which produced The Twilight Saga films

== See also ==
- Weedon Lois
- Weedon Bec
