= Culver Drive (Irvine, California) =

Road in Orange County, California, US

Culver Drive is a major arterial road in Irvine, Orange County, California, running approximately 9 miles (14 km) from southwest to northeast. Its southwest end is at its junction with Anteater Drive and Shady Canyon Drive, at the meeting point of the Turtle Rock, Turtle Ridge, and University Hills neighborhoods of Irvine. However, the road continues to the southwest under different names, Bonita Canyon Drive and then Ford Road, through a junction with California State Route 73 and into Newport Beach. At its northwest end, Culver Drive ends at its junction with Furrow in the Orchard Hills neighborhood of Irvine. Its length is split roughly into thirds by its junctions with Interstate 405 towards its southwest end and with Interstate 5 towards its northeast end. For much of its length, it parallels California State Route 261, which runs to its northwest.

Culver Drive is named after Fred "Humpy" Culver, a local farmer who leased a large amount of land from the Irvine Ranch and built a large house with a windmill in 1910 at what came to be known as "Culver's Corner". At the time this corner was the junction of Culver Drive, Trabuco Road, and U.S. Route 101; now it is where Culver Drive has its junction with Interstate 5.

When the University Park neighborhood of Irvine was first developed in the mid-1960s (five years before Irvine's incorporation in 1971), Interstate 405 had yet to be built near the neighborhood. Culver, then a two-lane road, formed the main route into and out of the neighborhood. As the later neighborhoods or "villages" of Irvine formed, Culver Drive became a natural boundary for many of them.
