= Sitting on Top of the World (disambiguation) =

"Sitting on Top of the World" is a 1930 folk-blues song.

Sitting on Top of the World (or Sittin' on Top of the World) may also refer to:

== Albums ==
- Sittin' on Top of the World (Dean Martin album), 1973
- Sittin' on Top of the World (LeAnn Rimes album), 1998
- Sitting on Top of the World (Nightlosers album), 1995

== Songs ==
- "Sitting on Top of the World" (Liverpool F.C. song), 1986
- "Sittin' on Top of the World" (Da Brat song), 1996
- "Sitting on Top of the World" (Delta Goodrem song), 2012
- "Sittin' on Top of the World" (Burna Boy song), 2023
- "Sittin' on Top of the World", a song by Lenny Kravitz from the 1989 album Let Love Rule
- "Sitting on Top of the World", a song by The Pogues from their 1993 album Waiting for Herb
- "Sitting on Top of the World", a song by Amanda Marshall from her album Amanda Marshall, 1996
- "Sitting on Top of the World", a song by Alexandra Burke from her album Heartbreak on Hold, 2012

== See also ==
- "I'm Sitting on Top of the World", a 1925 popular song
- On Top of the World (disambiguation)
- Top of the World (disambiguation)
