= Signal Peak (Orange County, California) =

Mountain in Orange County, California

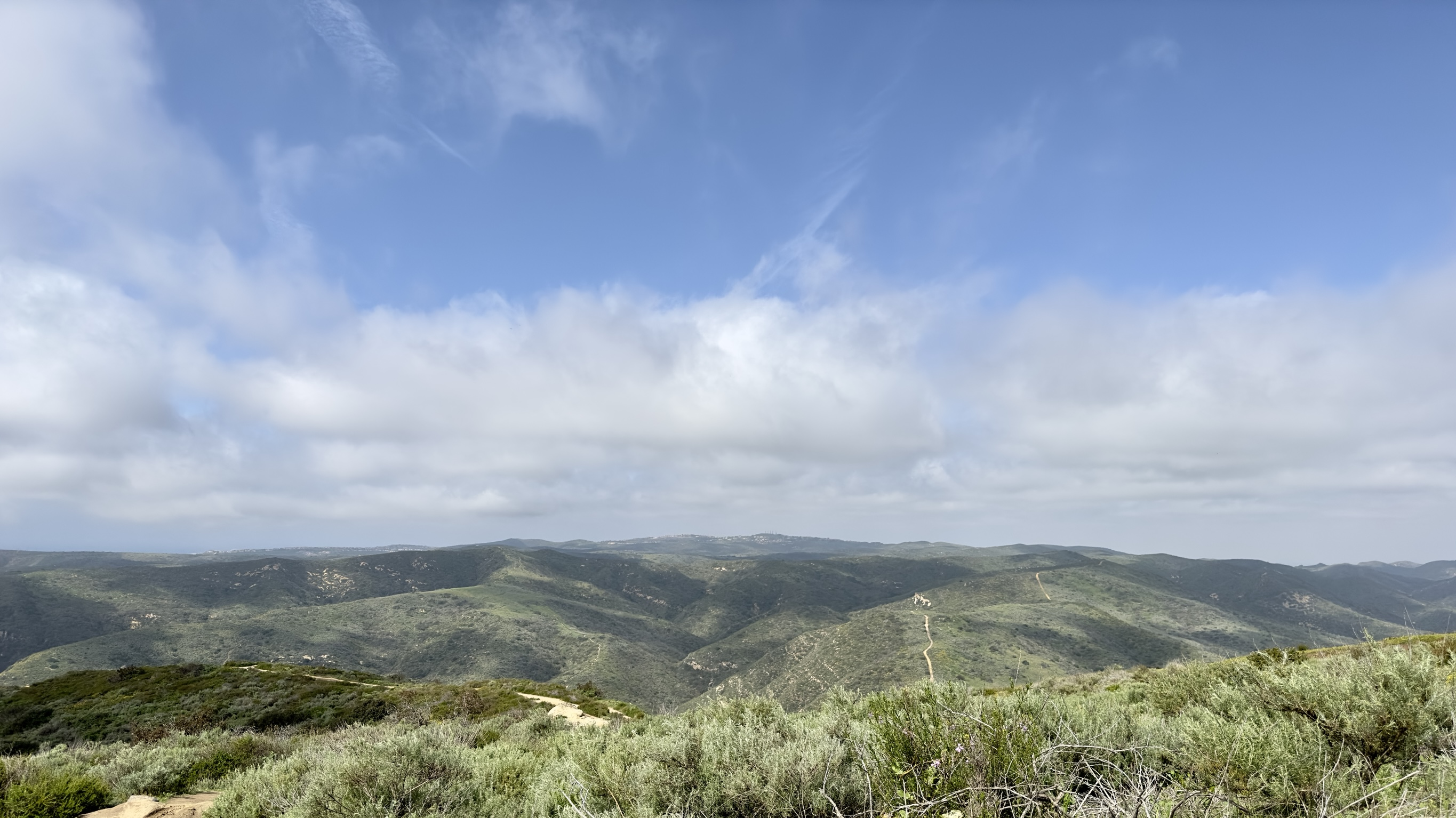
- Signal Peak visible from Temple Hill over Laguna Canyon

Highest point
- Elevation: 1,168 ft (356 m) NAVD 88
- Prominence: 794 ft (242 m)
- Coordinates: 33°36′22″N 117°48′43″W

Geography
- Location within California
- Location: Orange County, California, U.S.
- Parent range: San Joaquin Hills
- Topo map: USGS Laguna Beach

Signal Peak is the highest point in the San Joaquin Hills area of Orange County, California, United States. Its elevation is 1,168 ft (356 m). The peak is visible over the southern horizon from most of northern Orange County, and from far-southern Los Angeles County. Signal Peak overlooks the University of California, Irvine, to the north and Crystal Cove State Park to the south and southeast. It is the first and highest peak that one encounters traveling southbound on State Route 73. It is a major two-way radio site for Orange County.

Signal Peak also serves as a visual reporting checkpoint for incoming private aircraft from the south, inbound to land at John Wayne Airport.
