= IUSD =

IUSD may refer to:

- Indiana University School of Dentistry
- Irvine Unified School District
