= University Hills, Irvine, California =

Housing development on the UC Irvine campus

Coordinates: 33.64°N 117.84°W

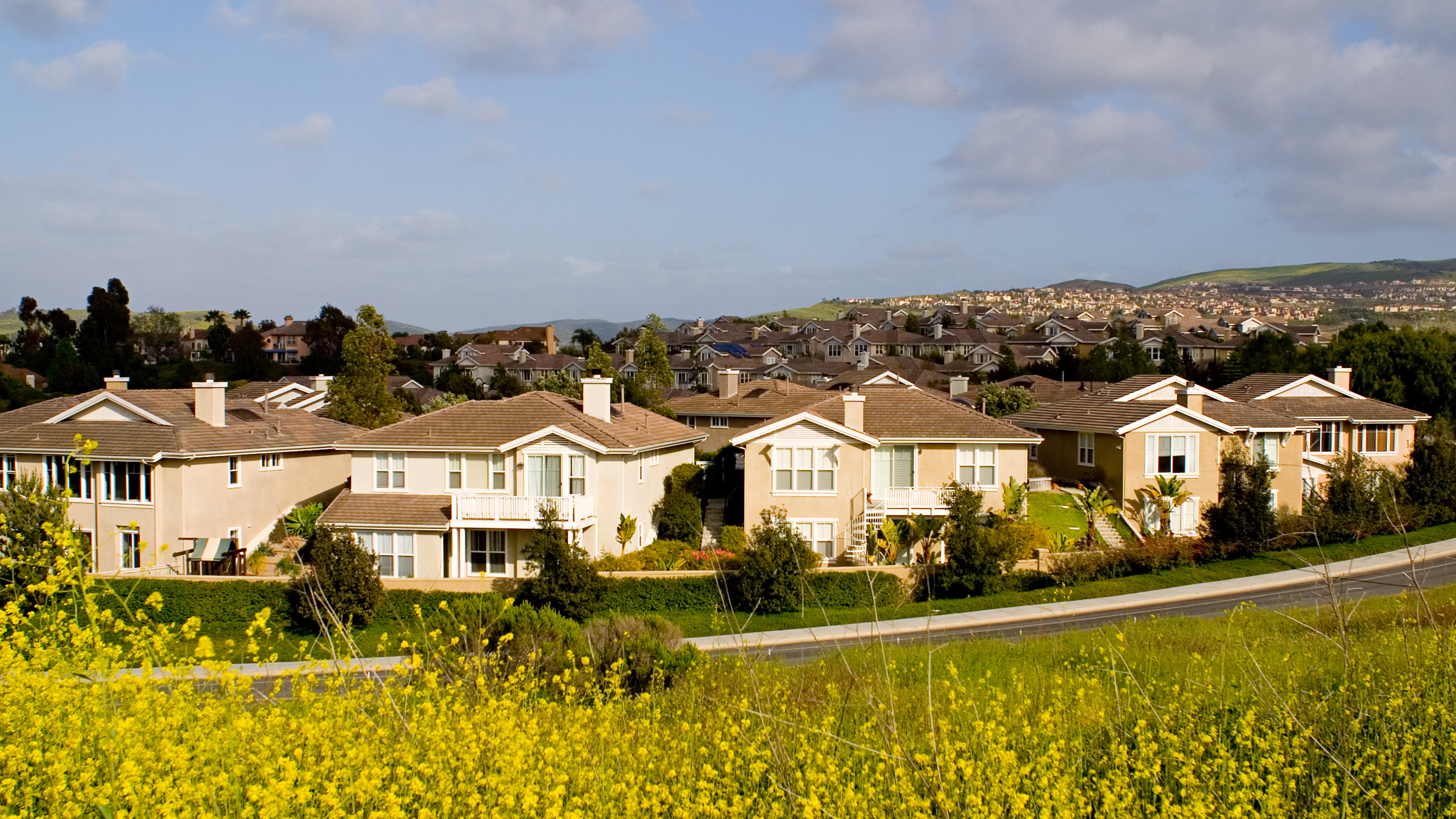
University Hills, from above California Ave

University Hills is a housing development on the campus of the University of California, Irvine (UCI) in southern Irvine, California, United States, consisting of 1226 for-sale homes and 384 rental units. University Hills was developed by the Irvine Campus Housing Authority, a not-for-profit corporation under the control of the university. UC Irvine developed the area as "a way to compensate for high Orange County housing costs that can keep a recruit from accepting a job at the university."

The land in University Hills is owned by the University of California and leased to homeowners; terms in the lease limit home ownership to university employees and restrict resale prices so that the homes remain affordable. Approximately 2/3 of the UCI faculty live in this neighborhood.

== Geography ==
University Hills, as its name suggests, lies on hilly ground. Both University Hills and the UCI Ecological Preserve along its western boundary occupy one of the northernmost and westernmost hills of the San Joaquin Hills, and reach a maximum elevation of 346.5 feet (105.6 m) above sea level.

== History ==
Although UCI had looked into creating faculty housing since 1969, no on-campus faculty-housing was built until the completion of the Las Lomas Apartments in 1982. Las Lomas, located on what would become the northwest end of University Hills, offered apartments to faculty members for rent. Soon after the completion of Las Lomas, the Irvine Campus Housing Authority (ICHA) was created and began construction on University Hills proper. The very first houses, completed in 1986, included a mixture of townhomes and detached houses; in addition, 13 lots were made available for custom-built homes. Construction on University Hills has proceeded in a number of small phases, consisting of a few streets each.

Beginning in 1987, University Hills residents became involved with a dispute with the Orange County tax assessor over their property taxes; the residents claimed that, since the land they lived on was owned by and part of a tax-exempt educational institution, they should only be assessed on the value of the buildings and not on the total value of the property. However, in 1992 the California Supreme Court ruled that the homes in the community did not meet the conditions of the tax exemption on land used for educational purposes.

In 2014, UCI demolished its campus observatory in order to build more housing at University Hills.

In 2026, the Irvine Campus Housing Authority (ICHA) Board rescinded the Homeowner Review Board's (HRB) authority to allow variances to original paint colors in the neighborhood. The new policy limits house colors to a selection that match the original as-built shades. ICHA has also pursued a homeowner to force repainting to an as-built color palette.

== Facilities ==
Apartments, condominiums, townhomes, and detached houses are available in sizes ranging from 800 to 3,200 square feet (300 m^{2}). Community amenities include Los Trancos Playground and Pool, located near the Las Lomas Apartments; Vista Bonita Park; the Garden Park; Reines Vista (named after Nobel physicist Frederick Reines); Urey Pool, Playground and Tennis Court; Gabrielino Pool; Gabrielino Community Park; Indy 500 Dog Park, and the Petite Paws Small Dog Park. In 1997, the Garden Park was awarded as an outstanding "Neighborhood Place in the Public Realm" by the American Institute of Architects. The Tierney University House, built in 2001, is a meeting site and home for the university chancellor, located in the southwest corner of University Hills. The University Hills Community Center, constructed in May 2010, provides places for the community to gather, hold meetings, and stage events. The community is also adjacent to a nature preserve traversed by many trails.

The University Montessori School, within University Hills, serves students up to the first grade. Although Vista Verde School is closer, the official Irvine Unified School District schools for University Hills are Turtle Rock Elementary School, Rancho San Joaquin Middle School, and University High School. The school district provides buses that carry the students approximately 2 miles (3.2 km) to Turtle Rock Elementary and approximately 3.5 miles (5.6 km) to Rancho.

== Street names ==
The main cross streets of University Hills are Los Trancos Drive, Gabrielino Drive, Vista Bonita Drive, and California Avenue. All other streets in University Hills are named after famous scientists, writers, artists, or musicians. In the initial phases of the community these names were assigned alphabetically, and included Alcott, Blake, Curie (named after both Pierre and Marie Curie), Dickens, Gibbs, Harvey, Locke, Mendel, Newton, Owen, and Perkins, Russell, Schubert, and Thompson, Urey, Virgil, Whitman, Whistler, Young, and Zola. Later names are not alphabetical, and include Bartok, Eliot, Handel, McClintock, Joyce, Murasaki, Fuertes, O'Keeffe, Frost, Twain, Brontë, Turing, Cervantes, Graham, and Angelou.

== Governing ==
University Hills is governed by the Irvine Campus Housing Authority (ICHA) Board and administered by the ICHA management. There is a Homeowners Representative Board (HRB) which acts as an advocate for residents' concerns, but whose only formal license is architectural review, subject to ICHA veto of HRB recommendations.
