= Creekside High School =

Creekside High School may refer to:

- Creekside High School (Irvine, California), a high school in Irvine Unified School District in Irvine, California
- Creekside High School, a high school in Murrieta, California
- Creekside High School (Florida), a high school in St. Johns County, Florida, near Jacksonville
- Creekside High School (Fairburn, Georgia)
- Creekside High School, a former high school in Murray School District in Murray, Utah
