= Portola High School =

Portola High School most commonly refers to:

- Portola High School, located in Portola, California
- Portola High School, located in Irvine, California

== See also ==
- List of high schools in California
