= Branden & James =

Voice and Cello Duo

- Also known as: Branden James, James Clark
- Years active: 2015–present
- Website: brandenjames.com

Branden & James is a duo composed of vocalist Branden James with James Clark on cello and background vocals. The two met when James, who performed in season 8 of America's Got Talent, was appearing in a charity concert in the Los Angeles area, and Clark was hired as the music director. They continued to make music together, and were married in January 2018.

== Career ==
=== 2015–present ===
James, who performed in season 8 of America's Got Talent, was appearing in a charity concert in the Los Angeles area, when Clark was hired as the music director. Clark was a classically trained pianist and cellist, who had worked as a music teacher in Adelaide, Australia for five years before moving to the US for his master's degree in cello performance at Cal State, Long Beach. The two became friends, and soon James engaged Clark to arrange songs for him, which evolved into playing together, vocal and cello. Clark went with James to a surprise gig he was offered at Vanessie, in Santa Fe, New Mexico. James’ five-week gig became seven months for both of them.

Describing their style, Clark comments "Everything is so fused with everything, there are so many mashups of everything—like this Steve Jobs opera [at the Santa Fe Opera] is EDM fused with classical. We fuse Bach with Elton John or Vivaldi with a Disney song; we're just trying to acknowledge our backgrounds in classical music, but play what we prefer, which is pop, rock and jazz."

Their popularity soon grew, and they were booked worldwide, and repeat resident artists, with about 50% of their work on several upscale cruise ship lines. "At this point," says Clark, "I think about 40% of our audience is gay and the rest are just people who have come across us and enjoyed the music. We are both well-versed in the harmonic language of choral music. We tend to choose songs that are very melodic and lend themselves to a classical singing style."

"I think audiences sometimes expect that because I play cello, it's going to be sad, slow music, which isn't the case at all," he adds. "A lot of pop bands have been incorporating cello on their recordings over the past ten years or so. The timbre and tone production is similar to the human voice."

In March 2020, during the COVID-19 pandemic, the duo performed for a livestream by Seniorly, a series of live arts performances tailored for seniors, especially those who are unable to enjoy performances in typical venues. They commented, "There are a lot of people suffering right now, and we feel it's our calling as artists to entertain the public in times of crisis. Now is our chance to soothe and to help people escape from this unprecedented reality." During this time, Branden & James were also offering a series of their own livestreams, available on StageIt. These were made up of many of the offerings they had performed in their shows, as well as new material. In July the duo's new CD Chasing Dreams was released, to much acclaim. As Broadway World noted, "BRANDEN & JAMES are bringing a soulful new sound to fans with the long-awaited release of their debut album, Chasing Dreams."

For 2021, still caught in the pandemic, Branden & James had a limited touring schedule, with an extended run at The Front Porch in Ogunquit, Maine, followed by The Pilgrim House in Provincetown, Massachusetts, Palm Springs, California and New Hope, Pennsylvania. Largely barred from traveling internationally, later in the year they planned a 40-city US tour.

== Discography ==
=== Singles ===
- You Belong (2016)
- Wicked Game (2017)
- Silent Night (2018)
- Shallow (2019)
- Mad World (2020)
- Going Home (2020, feat. Amanda Forsyth)
- Dancing on My Own (2020)
- Till We See (2020)
- Wild Horses (2021)
- Drivers License (2021)

=== Albums ===
- Hallelujah EP (2018)
- Chasing Dreams (2020)

== See also ==
- Branden James
