= Rosary Academy (Fullerton, California) =

High school in the United States

Location
- 1340 North Acacia Avenue; Fullerton, (Orange County), California 92831; United States; 33°53′2.5″N 117°53′53″W

Information
- Type: Private, all-female
- Motto: Forward. Thinking. Women.
- Religious affiliation: Roman Catholic
- Established: 1965
- CEEB code: 051007
- Head teacher: Shawna Pautsch
- Grades: 9–12
- Enrollment: 370 (2018-2019)
- Campus: Two-story
- Colors: Red and gold
- Athletics conference: CIF Southern Section; Pacific Coast Conference (California)
- Mascot: Royals (Crown)
- Team name: Royals
- Accreditation: Western Association of Schools and Colleges
- Newspaper: The Royal Reporter
- Tuition: $16,385 (registered in Catholic parish); $17,315 (other students); $23,835 (International Rate)
- Website: www.rosaryacademy.org

Rosary Academy is a Roman Catholic all-girls college-preparatory high school located in Fullerton, California, United States.

Owned and operated by the Diocese of Orange, it is accredited by the Western Catholic Educational Association and the Western Association of Schools and Colleges, and is a member of the National Catholic Educational Association. Rosary's brother school is Servite High School. Both schools had links to the now-defunct Cornelia Connelly High School.

Rosary offers a needs-based scholarship program as well as scholarships in various areas to incoming freshman students.

== History ==
The school was opened as Rosary High School in 1965 by the Roman Catholic Archdiocese of Los Angeles, and was originally administered by the Sisters of St. Joseph of Orange. In 1976 it came under the direction of the Diocese of Orange upon its creation.

The school began significant reorganization starting the 2014-15 school year, including a new organizational structure, new curricular and marketing programs, and the renaming of the institution as Rosary Academy the following year.

=== Stage collapse ===
On March 8, 2014, the theater stage in the associate Servite High School collapsed during the performance of Red and Gold, injuring 25 young students. The group of Rosary actors were performing the comedy Theatrical at the time the collapse. 250 persons had been on the platform.

== Notable alumnae ==
- Tayshia Adams (class of 2008) - is an American television personality. She received national recognition after appearing as a contestant on season 23 of The Bachelor, the sixth season of Bachelor in Paradise. On November 5, 2020, Adams replaced Clare Crawley as the Bachelorette on season 16 of The Bachelorette.
- Ashleigh Aitken, politician
- Stephanie J. Block, actress, singer, and podcaster, best known for her work on the Broadway stage
- Tara Campbell (class of 2011) - Mayor of Yorba Linda, California from 2018–2019, youngest elected female mayor in California history.
- Kaitlin Cochran (class of 2005) - softball four-time NCAA All-American, United States women's national softball team World Cup of Softball gold medalist
- Natalie Golda (class of 2000) - United States women's national water polo team two-time Olympic medalist, two-time World Champion, Pan-American Games gold medalist, two-time NCAA All-American, Peter J. Cutino Award winner
- Chelsea Gonzales (class of 2013) played infield for the Mexican National Softball Team in the 2020 Olympics in Tokyo (played in 2021).

== Notable staff ==
- Maureen O'Connor - Former mayor of San Diego
