= Branden James =

American singer (born 1978)

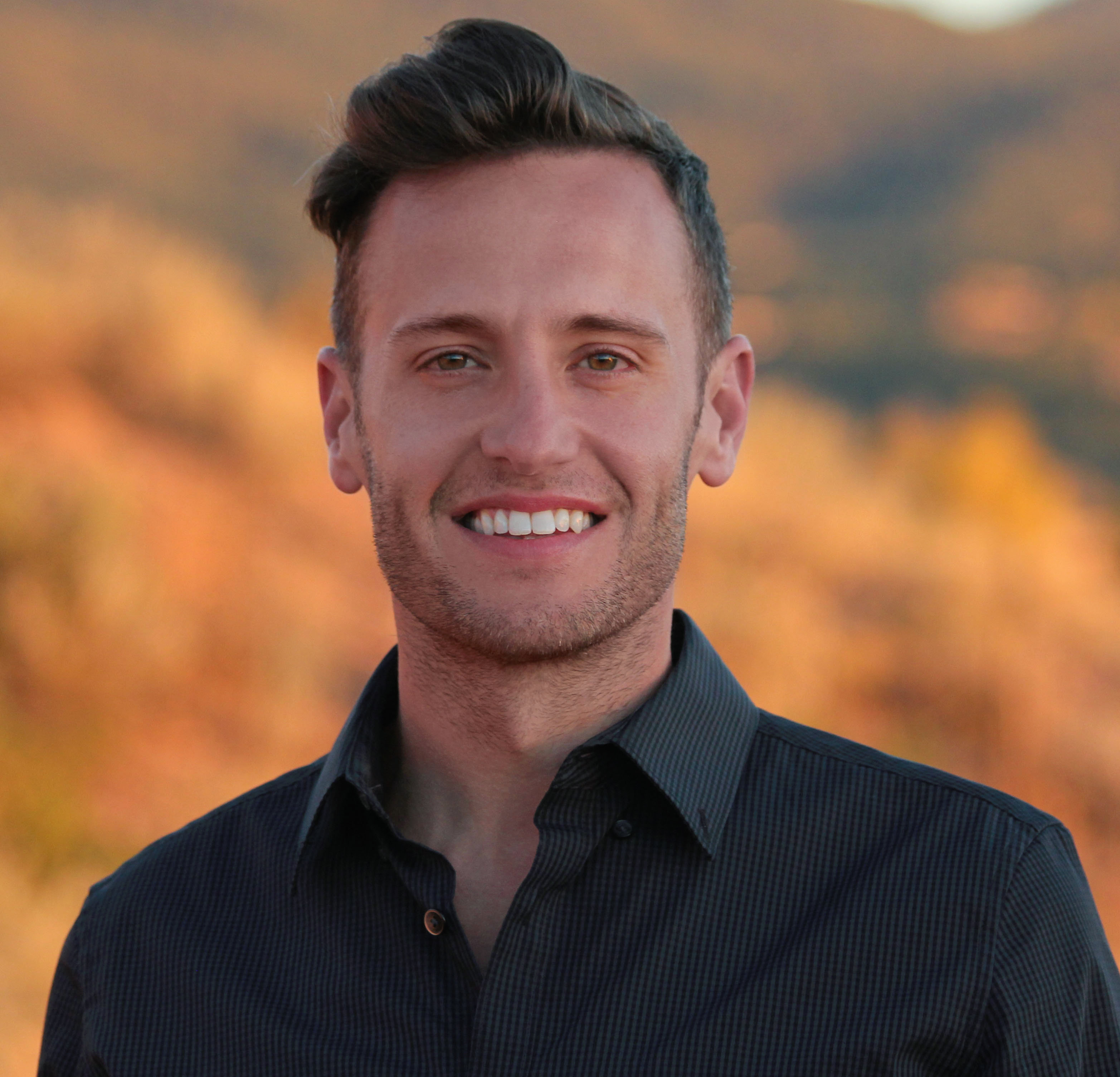

Background information
- Born: Branden James Smith; June 19, 1978 (age 48); Anaheim, California
- Origin: Los Angeles, California, United States
- Genres: Opera, Classical Crossover
- Instrument: Vocals
- Website: brandenjames.com

Branden James Smith (born June 19, 1978), known as Branden James, is an American tenor who has performed as a soloist with American symphony orchestras. James came to prominence as a contestant on America's Got Talent during the show's eighth season.

James has been a "regular soloist" for the Los Angeles Lakers at the Staples Center in Los Angeles, California and has also performed "The Star-Spangled Banner" for the Chicago Bulls, the Chicago Cubs, and the Chicago Whitesox in Chicago, Illinois. He also sang "The Star-Spangled Banner" at the 2014 Gay Games held in Cleveland and Akron, Ohio. In 2007, he "appeared in concert at St. Peter’s Basilica in Vatican City, Rome for Pope Benedict XVI celebrating the occasion of his 80th birthday." He also performed for Nelson Mandela's family in South Africa, and has made television appearances in Denmark, Norway, Romania, South Africa, Sweden, the United Kingdom, and the United States. He has also performed around the world as part of the 12 Tenors.

As a judge on the eighth season of America's Got Talent, Heidi Klum praised James: "I love Branden James. I feel like he has that natural gift, you know, he has that beautiful, beautiful voice that gives me chills."

== Early life ==
James was born in Anaheim, California. His grandfather was country music artist Jimmy Smith; Smith collaborated with Elvis Presley and Johnny Cash. James' interest in performance began at the age of 17 when a friend heard him singing along to an Amy Grant Christmas album and suggested he audition for choir. He attended Irvine High School in Irvine, California, where his audition led to part with The Irvine Singers. At Irvine High School he was also active in theater.

While a member of The Irvine Singers, a "choir mentor" suggested James' voice had a "natural, classical sound" and recommended a teacher, suggesting he fine-tune his voice and recommending that he make singing his "craft." This same mentor suggested a focus on classical music, which James took up as a professional foundation until later, when he eventually embraced a "crossover" presence as a performer in New York City.

Following his graduation from Irvine High School in 1996, James was accepted and went to study at The San Francisco Conservatory of Music. While a student at The San Francisco Conservatory of Music, James worked as a singing waiter in Switzerland during a summer break. Following his time at The San Francisco Conservatory of Music, James moved to New York City to pursue a career as an opera singer.

== New York City, Las Vegas, and Chicago ==
In New York City, James developed a fondness for pop music and "became influenced by the styles of: Whitney Houston, Michael Jackson, Elton John, and Aretha Franklin." He lived in New York City for nine years, auditioning for opera and Broadway theater and performing for two seasons in the chorus at The Metropolitan Opera at Lincoln Center in New York City. In 2007, in the midst of a rising career in New York City, James "performed before Pope Benedict XVI at St. Peter's Basilica in Vatican City" as the member of a chorus.

In the summer of 2012, James was given the opportunity to headline a production: David King's "The Spirit of Dance" at the New York-New York Hotel and Casino in Las Vegas, Nevada

By 2013, James was living in Chicago, Illinois (in the city's Lincoln Park neighborhood) singing in the chorus of the Lyric Opera of Chicago, in local venues including Chicago wine bars The Twisted Vine and Chicago City Winery, as well as at larger-scale events such as the Northalsted Market Days. In Chicago, he auditioned for America's Got Talent. Previously, James had auditioned for the "producer's table" at American Idol and The Voice.

== America's Got Talent ==
James had been nudged by friends to audition for America's Got Talent but had not seen the show when the opportunity to test in Chicago presented itself. Despite jet lag, (having flown in from a performance in Sydney the night before), James auditioned for season eight of America's Got Talent, during episode 805, and sang "Nessun dorma" (the aria in the final act of Turandot, the Giacomo Puccini opera), receiving an affirmative vote from all four judges (Howard Stern, Heidi Klum, Mel B, and Howie Mandel). On his success with America's Got Talent relative to American Idol and The Voice, James stated: "I consider myself very lucky and grateful that people paid attention this time around and realized that there was something that they could do with me."

Having advanced to the Las Vegas, Nevada round (season eight, episode 808), James coasted into the New York City quarterfinals without performing. During the quarterfinals (season eight, episode 810), James performed "You Raise Me Up" (the Josh Groban piece) and advanced to the semi-finals (season eight, episode 811). During the second week of semi-finals (season eight, episode 822) he sang Heart's song "Alone." James advanced to the finals during this season of America's Got Talent (episode 823). During the top 12 finals (episode 824), James performed Leonard Cohen's "Hallelujah" but did not advance to the season finale.

In the time James participated as a contestant on America's Got Talent, he addressed a number of personal issues. Having grown up "in a very conservative and traditional family," Branden was forthcoming about the struggles he faced due to his sexual orientation; although his mother, Lynda Smith, disapproved of his sexuality she has been openly supportive of James' efforts and attended his America's Got Talent audition and performances. James' parents (Lynda and Jim Smith) "found out he was gay while he was in college" and "disapproved," unable to reconcile "his sexuality with their Christian values" but finding common ground with their son.

Regarding social media comments in response to his openness and to his performances, James stated: "Here’s something where I also changed my thinking. I stopped reading them... I just stopped reading them because I realized that, even though I can kind of laugh some things off — there’s a lot of controversial things in there — I don’t need that to be in my subconscious, and I feel like it is whether you choose to acknowledge it on a conscious level or not. It’s still in your subconscious and it can really play games with you. It gets in the room artistically. So honestly, I don’t know what’s out there right now and I’m kind of happy just to be in my own zone."

During the competition, Howard Stern praised James "for his 'emotion, power, (and) talent.'"

== Present ==
James returned to Chicago to perform at the Auditorium Theatre of Roosevelt University on September 24, 2015.

James was featured in the lineup for Tim Janis' "The American Christmas Carol" on December 4, 2015, at Carnegie Hall in New York City. The event, which featured a full orchestra and a 200 voice choir, was held in celebration of the show's 10th year at Carnegie Hall. James was joined by special guests Neil Sedaka, Sarah McLachlan, Zachary Levi, Ioan Gruffudd and other performers. All proceeds from the show were earmarked for both Kate Winslet's Golden Hat Foundation, "which aims to change the way people with autism are perceived," as well as for Sarah McLachlan's School of Music, "which provides no cost music instruction to at-risk children and youths."

James is co-host of Afterbuzz TV network. He also plays in a vocal and cello duo with James Clark; the duo's name is a combination of both musicians' names: Branden James. The duo has now partnered with Scott Page, of Supertramp, Toto, and Pink Floyd fame in Page's Ignited Network; through the Ignited Network partnership the duo is recording a full-length album. He is also a regular solo performer on Crystal, Princess, and Holland America Cruise lines.

James is founding an organization called "You Belong" to nurture "the common principle that we're all the same." James has explained the effort will emphasize the concept that everyone "has a place in this world because we're all human and one day we'll find that place through love and acceptance."

In April 2020, responding to the isolation of the coronavirus pandemic, James & his partner James Clark began live-streaming concerts directly to their followers. In September, James memoir "Lyrics of my Life" was released. In sharing all the details of his life, James hopes to continue the example for healing for young gays that he began with his honest conversations on America's Got Talent. As stated by WGN Radio "The book : "Lyrics of My Life: My Journey with Family, HIV, and Reality TV,” is Branden’s life story but it is so much more. It's filled with inspiration for so many others who may be struggling with similar issues while being raised in a very conservative religious environment."

== Personal life ==
Currently, James is based in New York City. James had once stated one of the toughest things about being on the road is missing his dog, which he acquired while living in Chicago, Illinois.

In the early part of 2015, James disclosed he was diagnosed HIV positive in his mid-20s. James stated: "I formed a major complex about what people would think of me. I kept it a deep dark secret to everyone except the trusted few." Regarding the response to this news, he stated "It was liberating actually, and I was shocked to see that people took it a lot less harsh than I ever anticipated." James had planned to go public about being HIV positive when he competed on America's Got Talent in 2013 but his partner at the time was afraid of the backlash.

James remains very close to his family, including extended relatives: "Since James started singing, music has become a bigger part of his extended family," according to his uncle Fred de Avila: "a change of pace for the sports-centric de Avilas/Smith's." James has 3 siblings in total, 2 brothers and a sister. Ashley Smith, James sister who shares a passion for singing and is also fond of singing with him; she has followed him into music, learning the piano and singing from him. His cousin, Joe de Avila, 23, plays guitar and piano and was also influenced by James.

Since 2012, James’ extended family has gathered every year at William R. Mason Regional Park in Irvine, California to host the "De Avila Dash," which consists of a one-mile walk or run "honoring the memory of the de Avila patriarch, Fred de Avila Sr."

James is newly married to cellist James Clark. They play together in the duo Branden & James, named after both musicians.

== Discography ==
- David Conte – Gift of the Magi (2001)
- Repo! The Genetic Opera (2002)
- Songs of Freedom and Inspiration (2007)
- The Voice of Christmas (2013)
- Crossover (2015)
- Hallelujah duo Branden & James (2018)
- Chasing Dreams duo Branden & James (2020)

== Sources ==
- Daly, Sean; Majeski, Ashley (2013). Inside AGT: The Untold Stories of America's Got Talent (1st US paperback ed.). CreateSpace Independent Publishing Platform. ISBN 978-1492203605.
- Gitner, Seth (2015). Multimedia Storytelling for Digital Communicators in a Multiplatform World (1st ed.). Routledge. ISBN 978-0765641328.

== See also ==
- Branden & James
