= 2015 European Athletics U23 Championships – Women's 5000 metres =

The women's 5000 metres event at the 2015 European Athletics U23 Championships was held in Tallinn, Estonia, at Kadriorg Stadium on 12 July.

== Medalists ==
Gold	Liv Westphal; France
Silver	Louise Carton; Belgium
Bronze	Viktoriya Kalyuzhna; Ukraine

== Results ==
=== Final ===
12 July

Rank	Name	Nationality	Time	Notes
1st place, gold medalist(s)	Liv Westphal	France	15:30.61	NUR PB
2nd place, silver medalist(s)	Louise Carton	Belgium	15:32.75	NUR PB
3rd place, bronze medalist(s)	Viktoriya Kalyuzhna	Ukraine	15:38.38	NUR PB
4	Monica Madalina Florea	Romania	15:38.45	PB
5	Calli Thackery	United Kingdom	15:47.71	
6	Bethan Knights	United Kingdom	15:51.49	PB
7	Nina Savina	Belarus	15:54.97	PB
8	Yelizaveta Pakhomova	Russia	15:57.26	PB
9	Camilla Richardsson	Finland	15:57.95	PB
10	Imana Truyers	Belgium	15:59.93	PB
11	Nataliya Soltan	Ukraine	16:01.29	PB
12	Anežka Drahotová	Czech Republic	16:03.18	PB
13	Carolin Kirtzel	Germany	16:05.91	
14	Anne Luijten	Netherlands	16:29.60	
15	Meropi Panagiotou	Cyprus	16:31.78	NUR
16	Karoline Egeland Skatteboe	Norway	16:41.60	
17	Anna Fyodorova	Russia	17:05.76	

== Participation ==
According to an unofficial count, 17 athletes from 13 countries participated in the event.

- Belarus (1)
- Belgium (2)
- Cyprus (1)
- Czech Republic (1)
- Finland (1)
- France (1)
- Germany (1)
- Netherlands (1)
- Norway (1)
- Romania (1)
- Russia (2)
- Ukraine (2)
- United Kingdom (2)
