= Viktoriia Kaliuzhna =

Ukrainian long-distance runner

Personal information
- Nationality: Ukrainian
- Born: 11 July 1994 (age 32)

Sport
- Sport: Athletics
- Event: Long-distance running
Medal record
Women's athletics
Representing Ukraine
European U23 Championships
Bronze medal – third place	2015 Tallinn	5000 m

Viktoriia Kaliuzhna (born 11 July 1994) is a Ukrainian long-distance runner. She competed in women's marathon at the 2020 Summer Olympics, but did not finish.
