= Roof of the World (disambiguation) =

Roof of the World is a metaphoric description of the high region in the world, also known as High Asia.

Roof of the World may also refer to:

- The Roof of the World, a Doctor Who audio drama
- "The Roof of the World", first episode of the 1964 Doctor Who serial Marco Polo

== See also ==
- Top of the World (disambiguation)
- Mount Imeon, an ancient name for the Central Asian complex of mountain ranges comprising the present Hindu Kush, Pamir and Tian Shan
