= Irvine High School =

Location
- 4321 Walnut Ave; Irvine, California 92604; United States; 33°42′09″N 117°46′57″W

Information
- School type: Public Secondary
- Motto: Integrity, Honor, Social Responsibility (IHS Values)
- Established: 1974
- School board: Irvine Unified School District
- Superintendent: Cassie Parham
- School number: 30 73650 303152
- Principal: Jeffrey Hernandez
- Faculty: 75.95 (on FTE basis)
- Grades: 9–12
- Enrollment: 1,951 (2025-2026)
- Student to teacher ratio: 26:1
- Language: English
- Area: Unknown
- Colors: Green, light blue, and white
- Athletics conference: Pacific Coast League
- Mascot: Vaquero
- Team name: Vaqueros
- Rival: Other High School in Irvine
- Newspaper: El Vaquero
- Yearbook: Citadel
- Television: iTV Public
- Website: irvinehigh.iusd.org

Irvine High School is a public high school, located in the city of Irvine in Orange County, California, United States. It is part of the Irvine Unified School District. The school is located in the El Camino Real neighborhood in the north-central part of the city.

As of the 2025–2026 school year, the school had an enrollment of 1,951 students and 76 classroom teachers (on an FTE basis), for a student-teacher ratio of 26:1

== Awards and recognition ==
During the 1988–89 school year, Irvine High School was recognized with the Blue Ribbon School Award of Excellence by the United States Department of Education, the highest award an American school can receive.

It was named a California Distinguished School by the California State Board of Education in both 1988 and 2007.

Additionally, in 2000 and again in 2006, the Accrediting Commission for the Western Association of Schools and Colleges awarded Irvine High a full six-year term of accreditation under the Pursuing Excellence format.

Irvine High School has also been named a Grammy “Signature Gold” for its instrumental and choral music departments.

The High School provided facilities for the 2010 Pan Pacific Swimming Championships in August 2010.

== History ==
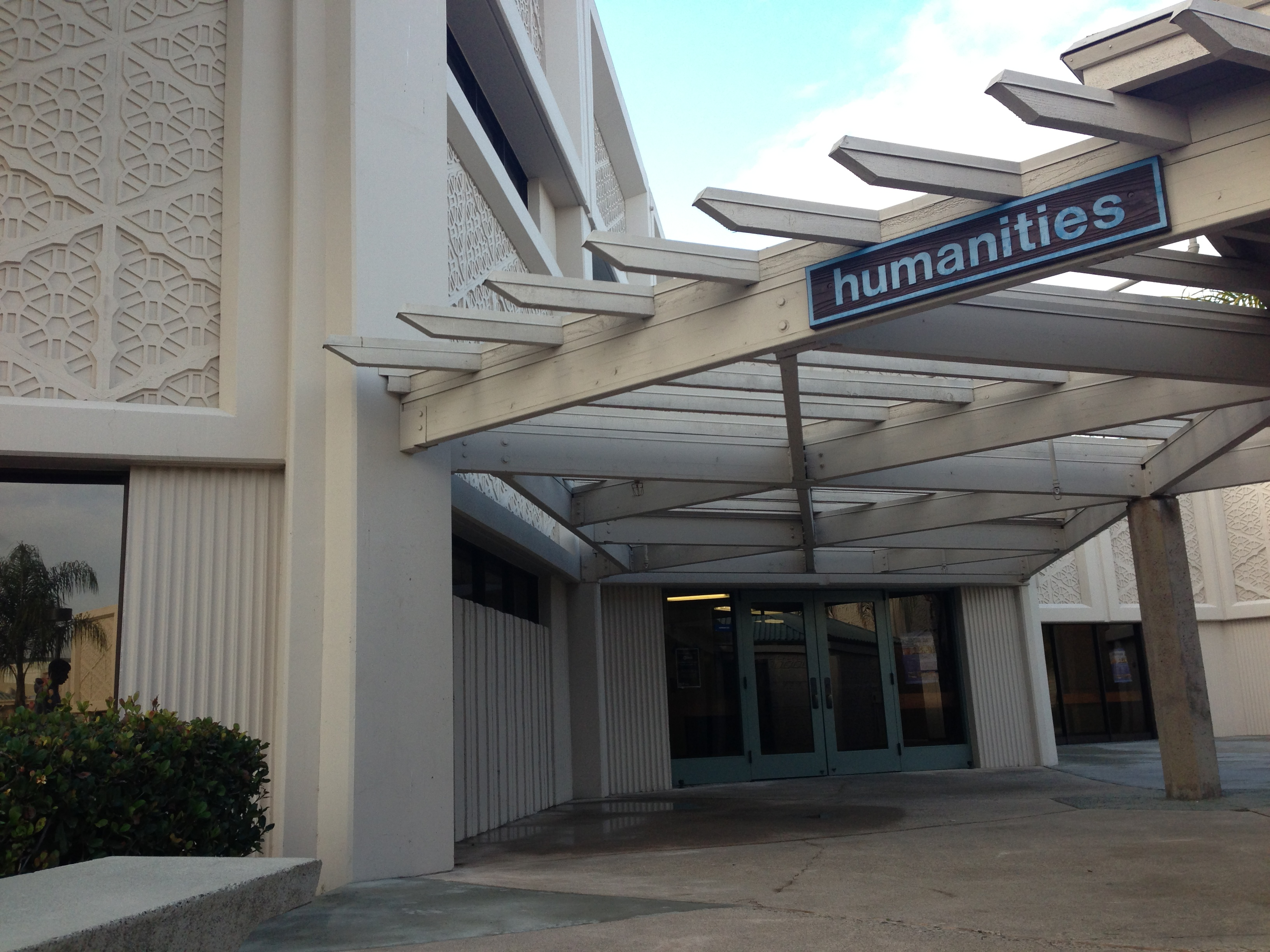
Exterior of Humanities Building

Soon after it opened in 1970, University High School, the first high school in Irvine, began to get too crowded from the influx of residents moving to Irvine's fast-developing housing tracts. The school district had already planned for a second high school to be built on what was then the extreme north side of the city across Walnut Avenue from the Greentree residential tract which was completed in 1973. Dr. Dean Waldfogel was chosen to be the first principal of Irvine High School; Waldfogel selected his faculty of a dozen teachers from a large number of applicants. The fledgling organization accepted its first class of 300 freshmen in September 1975. Because the high school's buildings were still under construction and not ready for occupation, the new high school was housed in extra classrooms and portable buildings at Rancho San Joaquin Middle School, sharing facilities such as sports, music and the library with the younger students there. The new Irvine High School campus opened its doors in September 1976, taking in as sophomores the former class of "Rancho" ninth graders as well as a new class of freshmen. Each successive year added another class of freshmen and in September, 1978, the high school finally had all four classes of students. Construction continued on campus during this time, with the theater and the main gym becoming available in 1977, the football-track field in 1978 and the aquatic center in 1979. The first class graduated in June, 1979.

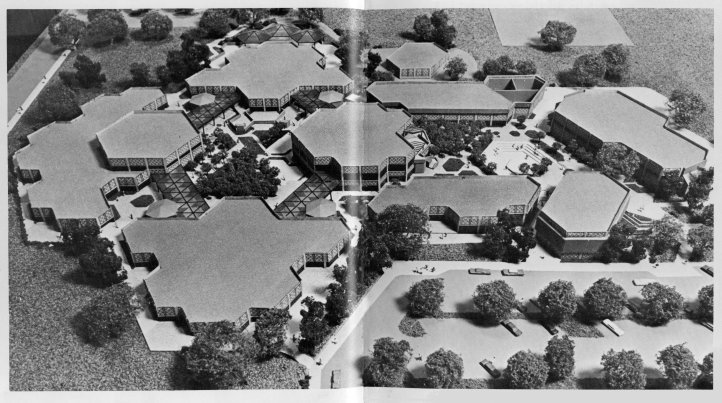
Early architectural model of Irvine High School as published in the 1976 yearbook, showing the hexagonal design scheme which extends throughout the plan.

The campus itself is notable for its architecture. It was designed by architect Ron D. Young in the Brutalist architecture style, and built largely of tilt up concrete slabs featuring distinctive cast geometric inlays. The shapes and angles of floor plans and design motifs were based on the hexagon. The initial layout of the Humanities building envisioned two or three teachers and their respective students sharing a single open plan hexagonal room, but this quickly proved too distracting. Portable office dividers were placed in a line to define classroom boundaries, but noise was still a problem. After two years of such conditions, walls were erected to close off the large, open hexagons. Soon the Math building was also added in as well as the new gym.

Irvine High School's alma mater is inspired by Jean Sibelius's composition Finlandia and arranged by Eugene Davis, a member of the class of 1980. In 2014, the History Building was added into the edge of the school and in 2024, the Irvine High School Theatre and Performing Arts Center Building was added.

== Academic teams ==
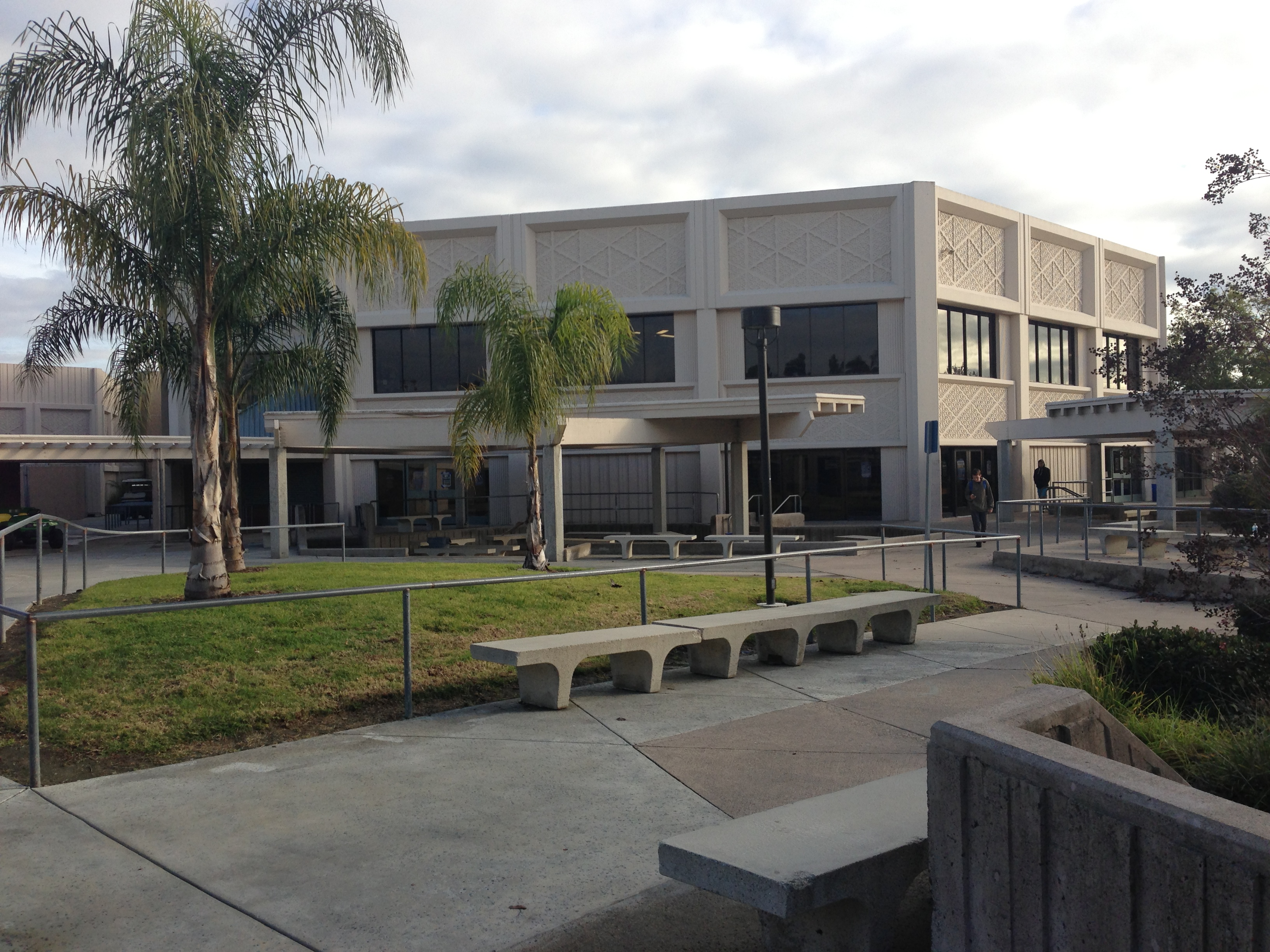
Exterior of Irvine High School, with Student Center in the background

Irvine High has several distinguished academic teams. The Science Olympiad team placed first in Orange County and third in California in the 1986-1987 Science Olympiad competitions, and second in Orange County and fourth in Southern California in the 2010–2011 Science Olympiad competitions. In the American Chemical Society National Chemistry Olympiad, Irvine High School students qualified as national finalists by placing in the top twenty of the nation in 1986 (You Chun Yang), 1991 (Navin Jani), and 1992 (Ashish Kalthia), sending them to the U.S. Air Force Academy Study Camp to prepare for competition in the International Chemistry Olympiad. At the time, Irvine High School was the only high school in the nation to have had three different students qualify as finalists. The Quiz Bowl team, begun in the 2010–2011 school year, informally ranked in the top 15 schools in Southern California that season. It tied for second in the regular division of the Triton Spring Quiz Bowl Competition. In the 2011–12 season, the Irvine Team placed sixth place at the UCSD Triton Fall Tournament, qualifying them for the 2012 PACE NSC Quiz Bowl Tournament in St. Louis. Irvine's newspaper, the El Vaquero, is regarded as the best high school newspaper publication in the nation, having won the first place prize in 2014.Irvine High School is also a founding high school in the Irvine CubeSat STEM Program, and is in charge of developing and working on microsatellite propulsion methods.

== Notable alumni ==
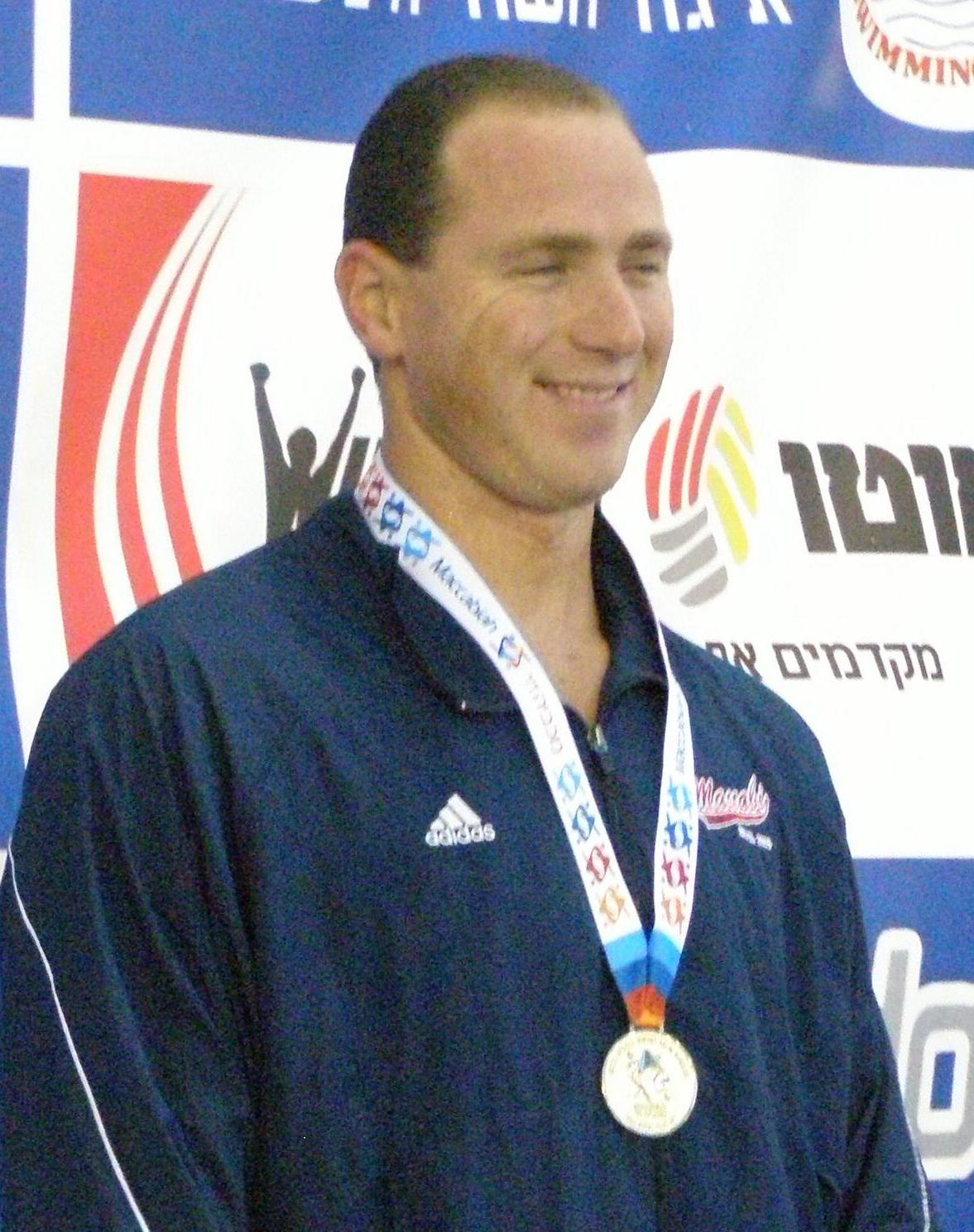
Jason Lezak

- Eric Anderson, musical theatre actor
- Amanda Beard, U.S. Olympic Women's swimmer
- Jennifer Brundage, US Olympic Women's Softball team
- Jack DeSena, actor on All That and Avatar: The Last Airbender
- Sameer Gadhia, main vocalist with Young the Giant
- Bob Hamelin, former Major League Baseball player
- Georgia Hardstark, comedian and co-host of the podcast My Favorite Murder
- Branden James, crossover opera singer and America's Got Talent finalist
- Dustin Kensrue, solo artist and band member of Thrice
- Jason Lezak, US Men's four-time Olympic swimming champion
- Chris Mandeville, former National Football League player
- Beverly Oden, U.S. Olympic Women's volleyball player
- Elaina Oden, U.S. Olympic Women's volleyball player
- Kim Oden, U.S. Olympic Women's volleyball player
- Jason Peoples, winner on television show Average Joe
- Jimmy Raye, former National Football League player, senior advisor-front office Cleveland Browns
