= San Joaquin Hills, Newport Beach =

Neighborhood in Newport Beach, California, United States

San Joaquin Hills is a neighborhood in Newport Beach, Orange County, California As of the 2000 census, the population was 2,959. San Joaquin Hills was annexed into Newport Beach on January 1, 2002. Prior to 2002, it was a census-designated place.

There is an eponymous San Joaquin Hills neighbourhood to the east of the hills in Laguna Niguel.

== Geography ==
San Joaquin Hills is located at 33°36′44″N 117°50′12″W, in the San Joaquin Hills of Orange County.

According to the United States Census Bureau, San Joaquin Hills has a total area of 1.3 square miles (3.4 km^{2}). 1.2 square miles (3.2 km^{2}) of it is land and 0.1 square miles (0.3 km^{2}) of it (8.27%) is water.

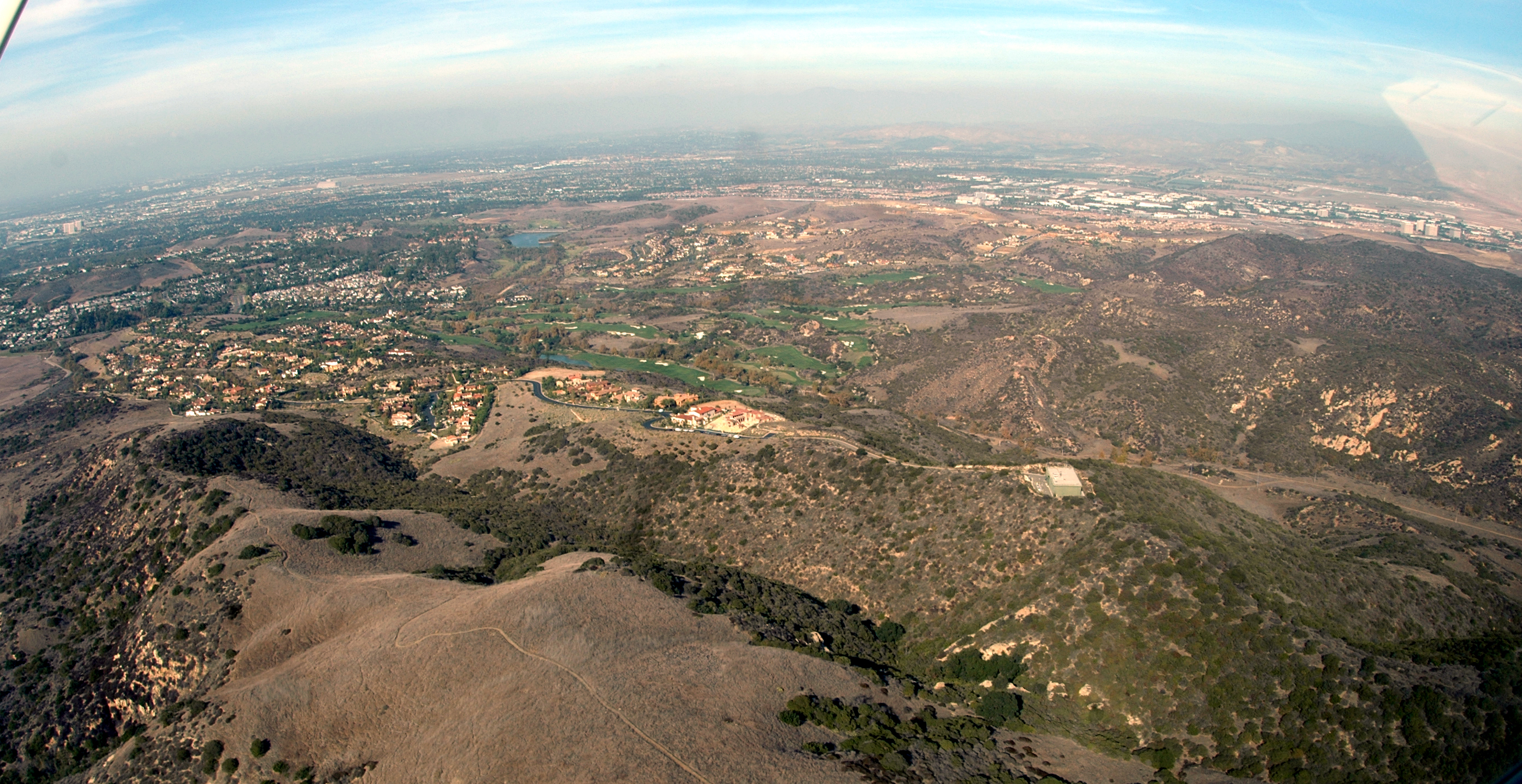
San Joaquin Hills, Newport Beach CA.

== Demographics ==
As of the census of 2000, there were 2,959 people, 1,376 households, and 769 families residing in the CDP. The population density was 2,427.8 inhabitants per square mile (937.4/km^{2}). There were 1,479 housing units at an average density of 1,213.5 per square mile (468.5/km^{2}). The racial makeup of the CDP was 85.97% White, 0.61% African American, 0.07% Native American, 9.53% Asian, 0.14% Pacific Islander, 1.39% from other races, and 2.30% from two or more races. Hispanic or Latino of any race were 3.31% of the population.

There were 1,376 households, out of which 28.0% had children under the age of 18 living with them, 49.8% were married couples living together, 4.1% had a female householder with no husband present, and 44.1% were non-families. 35.5% of all households were made up of individuals, and 3.3% had someone living alone who was 65 years of age or older. The average household size was 2.15 and the average family size was 2.87.

In the CDP, the population was spread out, with 21.7% under the age of 18, 3.4% from 18 to 24, 44.6% from 25 to 44, 24.6% from 45 to 64, and 5.6% who were 65 years of age or older. The median age was 37 years. For every 100 females, there were 94.0 males. For every 100 females age 18 and over, there were 96.1 males.

The median income for a household in the CDP was $132,879, and the median income for a family was $147,286. Males had a median income of $86,744 versus $70,497 for females. The per capita income for the CDP was $66,544. None of the families and 0.8% of the population were living below the poverty line, including no under eighteens and none of those over 64.

== Government ==
In the California State Legislature, San Joaquin Hills is in the 37th senatorial district, represented by Republican Steven Choi, and in the 74th Assembly district, represented by Republican Laurie Davies.

In the United States House of Representatives, San Joaquin Hills is in California's 48th congressional district, represented by Republican Darrell Issa.
