= Pacific Coast Conference (California) =

The Pacific Coast Conference is an American high school sports league in Orange County, California and is affiliated with CIF Southern Section. The schools are located in South and Central Orange County, California.

== History ==
In 2019, Dana Hills High School and Laguna Hills High School announced their re-league. After votes failed, the two schools re-leagued into the Pacific Coast Conference. The Pacific Coast Conference became an 8-team conference for the first time in 2019.

Sage Hill School joined the Pacific Coast Conference in the 2022-2023 academic year.

As part of the 2024-2026 league re-alignment cycle, Beckman High School and Laguna Hills High School left the Pacific Coast Conference, with Beckman joining the Coast View Athletic Association and Laguna Hills joining the Golden Empire Conference. In that same re-alignment cycle, Laguna Beach High School, St Margaret's Episcopal School, and Rosary Academy (girls sports only) joined the Pacific Coast Conference, expanding the conference into 9 teams for girls sports and 8 teams for boys sports.

== Schools ==
- Irvine High School Vaqueros
- Laguna Beach High School Breakers
- Northwood High School Timberwolves
- Portola High School Bulldogs
- Rosary Academy Royals
- Sage Hill School Lightning
- St. Margaret's Episcopal School Tartans
- University High School Trojans
- Woodbridge High School Warriors

== Future ==
In May 2025, new league alignments for the 2026-27 and 2027-28 School years were approved by Orange County principals. St. Margaret's Episcopal School and Laguna Beach High School were among the schools that appealed to re-league, which would place St. Margaret's into the Trinity League and Laguna Beach into a new North County conference with schools in Anaheim, La Habra, Garden Grove, Fullerton, Yorba Linda, Brea, Placentia and Orange. Both appeals were approved by the CIF-SS Executive Committee. These new alignments would reduce the Pacific Coast Conference into a 6-team league for boys sports and 7-team league for girls sports.
