= Turtle Rock, Irvine, California =

Neighborhood of Irvine, California, United States

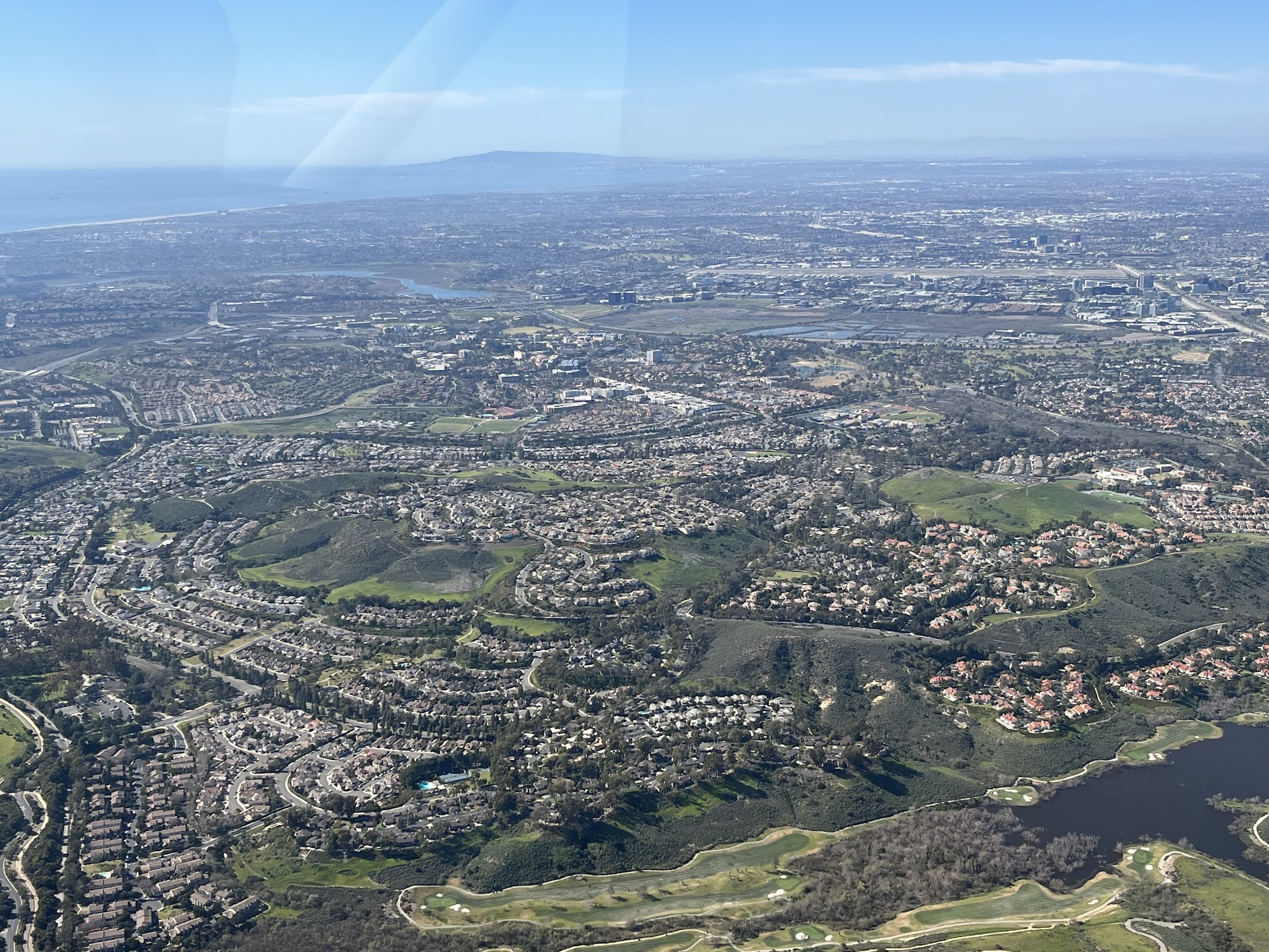
The Turtle Rock neighborhood from the air, looking west.

Turtle Rock is a neighborhood in the south part of Irvine, California, near Concordia University, Irvine and the University of California, Irvine. It is bounded to the north by University Drive and Mason Regional Park, to the east by the Strawberry Farms Golf Club and Ridgeline Drive, to the south by Shady Canyon Drive, and to the west by Culver Drive. Turtle Rock is one of the five "villages" originally forming Irvine; its 1967 founding is commemorated by a sculpture of a turtle in Turtle Rock Community Park, at the corner of Turtle Rock and Sunnyhill Drives. A two-lane internal loop road, Turtle Rock Drive, encircles the village and carries traffic between housing developments and the city's main streets.

Geographically, Turtle Rock lies in the San Joaquin Hills. The tallest point is a hill called "Sunset Point". Originally a nameless point, it was referenced as a part of Chaparral Park. It is often referred to as "Suicide Hill" online, due to the usage of the hill's steepest slope to perform the "Suicide" exercise routine. In 2021, the City Of Irvine conducted surveys and consulted with indigenous leaders, before officially naming the hill "Sunset Point". The highest point of Sunset Point is 161m tall. A lower peak to the north, also within the neighborhood, is called French Hill, with a peak of 128 meters. While it is not entirely clear where the name "Turtle Rock" comes from, there is a rocky outcropping on Rockview Drive at the northern end of the neighborhood (33°39′15″N 117°49′01″W) that is now maintained as part of an association park. This rock has the shape of the front of a turtle's carapace, and is sacred to the Gabrieleño Native Americans. It is often locally considered to be the origin of the name "Turtle Rock".

Overview of Turtle Rock at sunset

Schools within Turtle Rock include Turtle Rock Preschool, Turtle Rock Elementary School, Bonita Canyon Elementary School, University High School, and Concordia University.

Planning and housing issues within Turtle Rock have been discussed regularly in Southern California newspapers. Henry Irving uses Turtle Rock as one of several test cases for analysis of urban communication.

== Parks ==
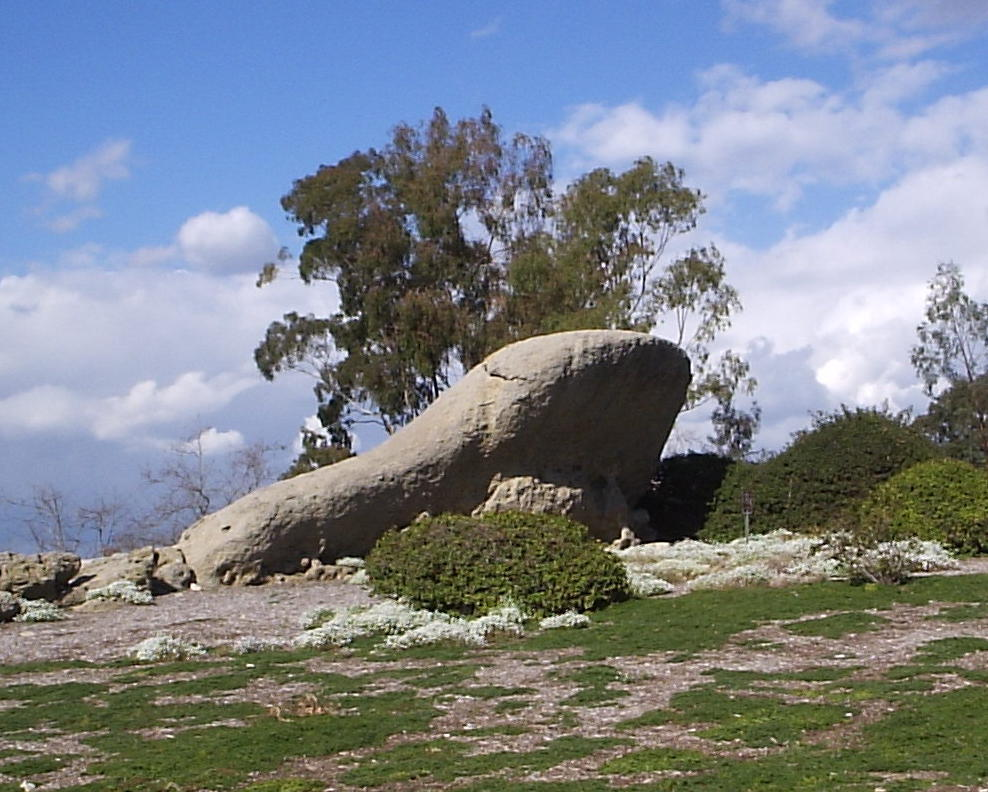
This is the outcropping often referred to as "Turtle Rock". It is held sacred by the Gabrieleño Native Americans, and is located in the northern part of the Turtle Rock neighborhood, near Concordia University, Irvine.

Turtle Rock features two community parks Turtle Rock Community Park and Chapparral Park. Turtle Rock Community Park sits in the intersection of Turtle Rock Drive and Sunnyhill Drive. Chapparral Park is Parrell to Bonita Canyon Elementary School and is a small open area with play structures and a small, paved trail.

== In popular culture ==
- In the 2003 video game Warcraft III: The Frozen Throne, one of the multiplayer maps is named Turtle Rock. This is because Blizzard Entertainment, the developer of the game, is headquartered near Turtle Rock.
