= Bethan Knights =

British-American long-distance runner (born 1985)

Personal information
- Nationality: British-American
- Born: 28 September 1995 (age 30) Bristol, England
- Height: 5 ft 5 in (165 cm)
- Weight: 105 lb (48 kg)

Sport
- Country: United States / United Kingdom
- Sport: Athletics
- Event(s): 5,000 m, 10,000 m
- College team: California Bears
- Coached by: Tony Sandoval

Achievements and titles
- Personal best(s): 5000 m: 15:45.94 1500 m: 4:19.60; 3200 m: 9:54.89 2 miles: 9:53.54

Bethan Knights (born 28 September 1995) is a British-American long-distance runner.

== University of Cal Berkeley highlights ==
In 2014, Bethan Knights ran in the Pac-12 Conference. Her 5th place at Pre-NCAA on October 18, 2014 was the highest of any Pac-12 runner. Knights achieved All Conference (3rd place), All Region (4th place), and All American honors (25th place) in her California Golden Bears Cross country freshman campaign.

In 2015, Knights opened her outdoor campaign by winning Cal Open 1500m in 4:21. She did not score in the 1500 m against Stanford University in their dual big meet but ran a pb in 4:19.60. She did not score in a 9th place 10,000 m finish in the Pac-12 Conference at UCLA. Knights ended her outdoor ncaa season as a 2nd team all-American 5000 meters runner by placing 16th.

In summer 2015 Knights placed 6th in 2015 European Athletics U23 Championships – Women's 5000 metres in 15:51.49.

On September 26, 2015 Knights won the Roy Griak Invitational in Minneapolis with a time of 20:53.8, edging Boise State freshman Allie Ostrander by 15 seconds.

On February 13, 2016, Knights set the best time in Cal Bears history with her 4:39.70 mile.

On February 27, 2016, Knights earned a silver medal at the 2016 Mountain Pacific Sports Federation Indoor Track and Field Championships in 3000 metres and won gold medal in the Distance medley relay in 2nd best time in Cal Bears history.

In 2016, Knights opened her outdoor campaign as a runner-up Big Ten - Pac 12 Invitational 1500m in 4:20.83. She ran 5000 m at Stanford University Invitational in 15:52.91. She raced 3000 m against Stanford University in their dual big meet finished second in 9:18.55. She scored in a 3rd place 5,000 m finish in the Pac-12 Conference at University of Washington. Knights ended her season as a 28th place in 5000 meters at NCAA Women's Division I Outdoor Track and Field Championships.

== High School highlights ==
In high school, Knights won the 2013 California state cross country title and the 2014 CIF California State Meet title at 3200 meters after finishing second in 2012 and the 2013 CIF California State Meet title at 3200 meters while running for Northwood High School in Irvine, California. She also competed in the Foot Locker Cross Country Championships as a senior of her prep career. She is signed to run for the University of California, Berkeley under coaches Tony Sandoval and Shayla Houlihan.

She improved upon Aisling Cuffe's listed U.S. high school record in the Girl's 2 mile 9:53.54 while winning the 2014 Brooks PR Meet in Seattle, Washington

== High School Awards and rankings ==
Orange County Girls cross country runner of the year
Orange County Varsity Girls track AOW June 9
Orange County Championships 2014 Varsity Girls track athlete of the meet
2014 Orange County Athletic Directors Association Pacific Coast League MVP
2014 FloTrack Girls 2 mile national record

United States High School Outdoor 2014 Rankings
1600 metres: 3rd
Mile: 24th
3000 metres: 7th
3200 metres: 1st
2 Mile: 1st

=== 2015 World Rankings ===
Women's 5000m 140th
Women's 10,000m 247th

== Personal life ==
Knights is an alumna of Northwood High School (Irvine, California) located in Irvine, California. She runs collegiately for the University of California, Berkeley. While currently a British citizen, she has stated she intends to apply for U.S. citizenship.
