= Sage Hill School =

Location
- 20402 Newport Coast Drive; Newport Coast, California 92657; United States; 33°37′5″N 117°49′33″W

Information
- Type: Private, secondary school, high school, middle school
- Opened: 2000
- Head of school: Patricia Merz
- Teaching staff: 57 (on an FTE basis)
- Grades: 7-12
- Enrollment: 595 (2025-26)
- Student to teacher ratio: 7:1
- Color
- Athletics: CIF Southern Section
- Athletics conference: Pacific Coast Conference (California)
- Nickname: Lightning
- Accreditation: Western Association of Schools and Colleges California Association of Independent Schools
- Newspaper: The Bolt
- Yearbook: The Storm
- Website: www.sagehillschool.org

Sage Hill School is an independent, co-educational college preparatory day school for students in grades 7–12, located in Newport Coast, California. The school first opened in September 2000 with a freshman and sophomore class of 120 students.

== About ==
Sage Hill has been accredited by the California Association of Independent Schools (CAIS) and the Western Association of Schools and Colleges since 2003. In 2026, Sage Hill School ranked 12th in Niche's Best Private High Schools in California, and 30th in the United States.

The school has an average enrollment of 700 students with an 8:1 student-teacher ratio, and class size of 14 students. It offers more than 40 advanced placement (AP), honors, and post-AP classes. The school's student to college counselor ratio is 37:1 The Lisa Argyros and Family Science Center houses learning and teaching space for biology, chemistry, physics, interdisciplinary study of science, and long-term research, and the 30,000 square-foot studio features the Kazu Fukuda Black Box Theater.

== Middle school ==
In 2023, Sage Hill announced its plan to develop a middle school and expand to grades 7 and 8, set to become the first 7-12 independent school in Orange County. The opening date for the middle school is August 2026. Sage Hill announced that it would start accepting applications for its inaugural middle school classes during the 2025–2026 school year.

On December 7, 2023, Newport Beach Planning Commission unanimously voted to approve the development of Sage Hill's middle school, allowing construction of the three-story middle school building and increasing Sage Hill's maximum student enrollment from 600 to 750 students. The project will also add a second gymnasium a seating capacity of over 1,000.

Effective July 1, 2024, Joseph Moody was named as the inaugural director of the middle school. The school sold approximately $54 million of municipal bonds to finance the building of the middle school as well as athletic facilities.

In March 2026, Sage Hill announced it accepted students for seventh, eighth and ninth grade for the first time.

== Athletics ==
The school offers 22 interscholastic sports totaling 54 teams at all levels of competition.
