= The Gift of the Magi (Conte opera) =

- Opera by David Conte
- Librettist: Nicholas Giardini
- Language: English
- Based on: "The Gift of the Magi" by O. Henry
- Premiere: December 7, 1997 (piano version); San Francisco Conservatory of Music

The Gift of the Magi is a chamber opera in four scenes with music by David Conte and libretto by Nicholas Giardini. Based on the 1905 short story of the same title by O. Henry, the opera focuses on Jim and Della, who are a poor married couple and cannot afford to buy each other presents for Christmas. It premiered on December 7 and 8, 1997 with a workshop production to the accompaniment of two pianos at the San Francisco Conservatory of Music. The orchestral version was premiered at the conservatory on December 3, 2000.

== Roles ==
- Jim (baritone)
- Della (soprano)
- Henry (bass-baritone)
- Maggie (mezzo-soprano)
- Magi (three voices)

== Synopsis ==
Jim and Delia's small flat. Christmas Eve.

Scene One: Della prepares for Christmas before Jim returns home. She lets her hair down and sings of her love and happiness. When Jim comes home, he briefly tries to entice her, then announces he has an errand to run. Being poor, Della reminds Jim, he should not get her a present for Christmas. Jim shrugs it off until she begs him to promise, then he leaves.

Scene Two: Della calls her friend Maggie to help figure out how to buy Jim a Christmas present, since they are poor and have no money. When Della reminds Maggie that she once received a generous offer for her hair from Madame Sophranie, the local beautician, Maggie becomes upset and begs Della not to sell her hair. Della tries to cut her hair herself, but when she realizes she can't do it, asks Maggie to do it for her. When Maggie can't do it either, Della convinces her to go with her to Madame Sophranie for moral support. They leave to sell Della's hair.

Scene Three: Jim arrives back home with his friend, Henry, who is helping him carry in a Christmas tree he found for free. As Henry prepares to leave, Jim shows him the gift he has gotten for Della - a set of combs that she had long coveted. Knowing Jim’s financial situation, Henry asks how he purchased them. Jim evades the question at first but eventually tells Henry he sold the watch that had once belonged to his father. Henry gets upset with Jim, reminding him that the watch had been in his family for years and calling him foolish. Jim sings of his love for both his father and his wife and Henry relents. As Henry leaves, Della arrives home and greets him.

Scene Four: Jim and Della reunite in their flat. Each admits having broken their promise and gives the other a gift. Della gives Jim his gift: A gold watch fob, purchased with the money she earned by selling her hair. Jim tries to hide that he no longer has the watch, but when Della discovers the watch is missing, Jim has no choice but to admit he sold it to buy her gift. He then gives Della her gift: the hair combs she had coveted for so long. When she sees them, she tearfully admits to Jim that she sold her hair to buy his gift. The couple reflect on their love for each other as well as their willingness to sacrifice for each other, and realize true love and selflessness are more valuable than any gift or material possession.

== Arias ==
Both "Della's Aria" and "Jim Soliloquy" can be found in E. C. Shirmer's Opera Aria Anthology vol. 1 Soprano and vol. 4 Baritone respectively.

== Recording ==
- Conte: The Gift of the Magi – Aimee Puentes (Della), Elena Bocharova (Maggie), Tim Krol (Jim), Chad Runyon (Henry), Branden Smith, Aaron DiPiazza, Gary Sorenson (Magi); San Francisco Conservatory New Music Ensemble; Nicole Paiement (conductor). Label: Arsis Records

== See also ==
- List of Christmas operas

== Sources ==
- American Record Guide (May 2002). "Conte: The Gift of the Magi
- Eidemiller, Maryann Gogniat (December 3, 2005). "'Magi' gets operatic treatment". Pittsburgh Tribune-Review
- Gerbrandt, Carl (2006). Sacred Music Drama: The Producer's Guide, 2nd edition. AuthorHouse. ISBN 1-4259-6847-3
