= Alta Laguna Park =

- Location within California Location within the United States
- Interactive map of Alta Laguna Park
- Location: Laguna Beach, California
- Coordinates: 33.55587°N 117.7588°W
- Elevation: 1,036 ft (316 m)

Alta Laguna Park is a community park atop Temple Hill, the second highest peak of the San Joaquin Hills, in Laguna Beach, California. It is located at the north end of the Top of the World neighborhood.

The neighborhood is named for its elevation of about 1,027 ft (313 m) above sea level, overlooking Saddleback Valley and the Pacific Ocean. Visitors can see most of Orange County from the park on a particularly clear day. The park provides a hiking and biking trailhead for the Aliso and Wood Canyons Wilderness Park. The Top of the World Reservoir is in a tank underneath the park.
