= Jimmy Raye III =

American football player, coach, executive, and administrator (born 1968)

Cleveland Browns
- Title: Senior Personnel Executive

Personal information
- Born: November 24, 1968 (age 57); Fayetteville, North Carolina, U.S.
- Listed height: 5 ft 9 in (1.75 m)
- Listed weight: 165 lb (75 kg)

Career information
- Position: Wide receiver (No. 18)
- High school: Irvine (CA)
- College: San Diego State
- NFL draft: 1991: undrafted

Career history

Playing
- Los Angeles Rams (1991); San Diego Chargers (1992)*; Houston Oilers (1993)*
- * Offseason or practice squad member only

Coaching
- Kansas City Chiefs (1995) Offensive quality control coach

Operations
- San Diego Chargers (1996–1999) Scout; San Diego Chargers (2000–2007) Director of college scouting; San Diego Chargers (2008–2012) Director of player personnel; Indianapolis Colts (2013–2016) Vice president of football operations; Houston Texans (2017) Vice president of player personnel/assistant general manager; Detroit Lions (2018–2021) Senior Personnel Executive; Cleveland Browns (2022–present); Senior Executive Advisor to the GM (2022-2025); Senior Personnel Executive (2026-present)

Career NFL statistics
- Receptions: 1
- Receiving yards: 19
- Return yards: 57
- Stats at Pro Football Reference

Jimmy Arthur Raye III (born November 24, 1968) is an American professional football executive and former player who is a senior personnel executive for the Cleveland Browns of the National Football League (NFL). He played in the NFL as a wide receiver for the Los Angeles Rams.

== Early life ==
Raye is the son of Jimmy Raye II, who was the offensive coordinator for seven different NFL teams, most recently the San Francisco 49ers. He attended Irvine High School in Irvine, California during his high school years.

== College career ==
A wide receiver for the Aztecs of San Diego State University (SDSU) from 1986 to 1990, Raye earned a bachelor's degree in public administration. He left SDSU tied for eighth on the school's all-time receiving list with 111 catches.

== Professional career ==
Raye's National Football League career began when he signed a free agent contract with the Los Angeles Rams in 1991. He ended up playing in the final two games of the season.

He was the offensive quality control coach for the Kansas City Chiefs in 1995. He joined the San Diego Chargers as a scout from 1996 to 1999, and served as the team's director of college scouting from 2000 to 2007. He was the Chargers' director of player personnel from 2008 to 2012.

In 2012, Chicago Bears general manager Jerry Angelo was fired, and Raye was one of four candidates for the job.

In 2013, Raye was hired as VP of Football Operations for the Indianapolis Colts, and held the post from 2013 to 2016.

In 2017, he was hired as VP of player personnel/assistant general manager for the Houston Texans.

In 2018, Raye was hired as Senior Personnel Executive for the Detroit Lions. On March 5, 2021, Raye parted ways with the Lions.

On June 16, 2022, Raye was hired by the Cleveland Browns as a senior executive advisor to the general manager.
