= Northwood High School (Irvine, California) =

Location
- 4515 Portola Parkway; Irvine, California 92620; United States; 33°44′02″N 117°45′02″W

Information
- School type: High School
- Motto: For the Good of the Pack
- Founded: 1999
- School district: Irvine Unified School District
- Superintendent: Cassie Parham
- Principal: Eric Keith
- Staff: 86.49 (FTE)
- Grades: 9-12
- Enrollment: 2,310 (2023–2024)
- Average class size: 29.2
- Student to teacher ratio: 26.71
- Area: Northwood
- Colors: White, silver, navy
- Athletics conference: Pacific Coast League
- Mascot: Timberwolf
- Team name: Timberwolves
- Rival: Portola High School
- Newspaper: The Northwood Howler
- Yearbook: The Element
- Feeder schools: Sierra Vista Middle School
- Website: northwoodhigh.iusd.org

Northwood High School is a public high school located in the northernmost part of Irvine, California, United States, in the Orchard Hills neighborhood. It opened in 1999, and its first graduating class graduated in 2002. In 2016, Northwood was ranked 25 nationally in Newsweek's list of top public high schools.

== Academics ==
The school operates on an alternating block schedule, in which students attend odd-period classes (1, 3, 5, and 7) on one day, and even-period classes (2, 4, 6, and 8) the following day. Classes are 90 minutes long, and meet for either 18 weeks (semester) or 36 weeks (year-long). On Tuesdays and Thursdays, students attend a tutorial session, which lasts for 35 minutes between the first and second classes of the day, and can be used at the students' discretion. Every Wednesday is designated a "late-start," in which classes start an hour later than the regular schedule. All students, with the exception of seniors, are required to take a minimum of six classes per semester. Seniors are required to enroll in a minimum of five classes for the fall and spring semester with the option of enrolling in local community college courses.

In 2005, 2009, 2013, 2021, and 2024, the school was recognized as a California Distinguished School and in 2006 was also named a Blue Ribbon School.

== Location and layout ==
Northwood High School sits at the foothills of the Santa Ana Mountains, and was surrounded by working avocado groves at its founding. The surrounding land is now Orchard Hills, a residential community extending north from the existing community of Northwood Pointe. Northwood High School's site had been designated for a high school from the very beginning as part of the Irvine Company's master plan, which was drafted in 1960.

== Student activities ==
The music program has received the Grammy Signature School award multiple times, the latest in 2015.

In 2006, the Northwood Marching Band won 1st in 5A division at The Huntington Beach High School Surf City Open. In 2008, the band placed 1st in 5A division at the Newport Beach Open.

Northwood's Speech and Debate team has won the title of #1 Speech and Debate Team in Orange County. In 2018, Northwood students won the title of State Runner-Up Champions at the California High School Speech Association Championships.

In 2018, Northwood's Boys Swim Team won the title of CIF and State Champions.

In 2021, Northwood's Football team won the Pacific Valley League Championship before capturing the CIF Southern Section D11 Championship. This was Northwood football's first Southern Section Championship.

In 2022, Northwood Football again won a CIF Southern Section Championship, this time D8, after winning the Pacific Hills League Championship. The most accomplished football team in school history went on to win the 2022 CIF 4-AA Regional Bowl game and play in the CIF 4-AA finals.

In 2024, Northwood's Flag Football team won the CIF Southern Section championship in the inaugural Division 2 championship game.

== Notable alumni ==
- Steve Birnbaum, Major League Soccer player
- Benny Feilhaber, U.S. Men's National Soccer Team midfielder
- Bethan Knights, British-American long-distance runner
- CJ Stretch, professional hockey player
- Zack Weiss (born 1992), American-Israeli Major League Baseball player
- Tabitha Yim, U.S. Women's National Gymnastics team member
- Young the Giant, rock band

== Links ==
- Official website
- Northwood High School Water Polo
- Northwood athletic websites
- The Northwood Television Show
- The Northwood Howler Online student newspaper
