= San Joaquin Hills (Laguna Niguel, California) =

Gated community in Laguna Niguel, California

Coordinates: 33°36′42″N 117°50′10″W

San Joaquin Hills is a guard-gated planned community in the city of Laguna Niguel, California in the San Joaquin Hills of Orange County, California. The community is set in the northernmost foothills of the city of Laguna Niguel, and construction began in 1997 after a 1994 approval from the city council to construct the development. It is composed of four community subdivisions, or enclaves of smaller subdivisional units. Each neighborhood within San Joaquin Hills has about 250 homes within its limits, and parks, as well as a community recreation and pool. There are a total of 910 homes in the development, and an estimated population of around 2,750 residents. It maintains its own Community Association, which maintains all the community centers and pools, as well as the landscaping. There are two entrances into the development from two separate gates. Its general boundaries begin at the Moulton Parkway and Aliso Creek Road intersection.

There is an eponymous San Joaquin Hills neighbourhood in Newport Beach to the west of the hills.

== The Communities ==
Many communities lie within San Joaquin Hills. Those communities include Crestview, Glen Cove, Knolls, and Somerset, and now The Summit (with a new final community coming Mar of 06). Each of these communities have smaller subdivisions within them of approximately 2 housing tracts per community. The majority of these housing tracts and communities were created by S&S construction company over the last decade of its building phase.

=== Knolls ===
Knolls is a community created by S&S construction company, and is the southernmost community within the San Joaquin Hills neighborhood. It surrounds the main community center, which comprises a single pool and patio area.

=== Crestview ===
Is a community created by S&S construction company, and is the center-most community within the San Joaquin Hills neighborhood. It is located adjacent to the main community center. It comprises 245 homes, all of which are detached and between 2,100 and 3,300 square feet (310 m^{2}) in size.

=== Glen Cove ===
Glen Cove is the largest community within San Joaquin Hills with 315 homes. It is central to Laguna Niguel Elementary School, and is entirely composed of detached homes.

=== Somerset ===
Like the Crestview, it is located in the center of the community. This community is sold out and has been replaced with The Summit.

=== The Summit ===
(S&S) This community was released September 2006 and is the high end homes with great city light view lots.

== External Links and Resources ==
- Community of San Joaquin Hills: Community Association Main Page
