= Louise Carton =

Belgian athlete

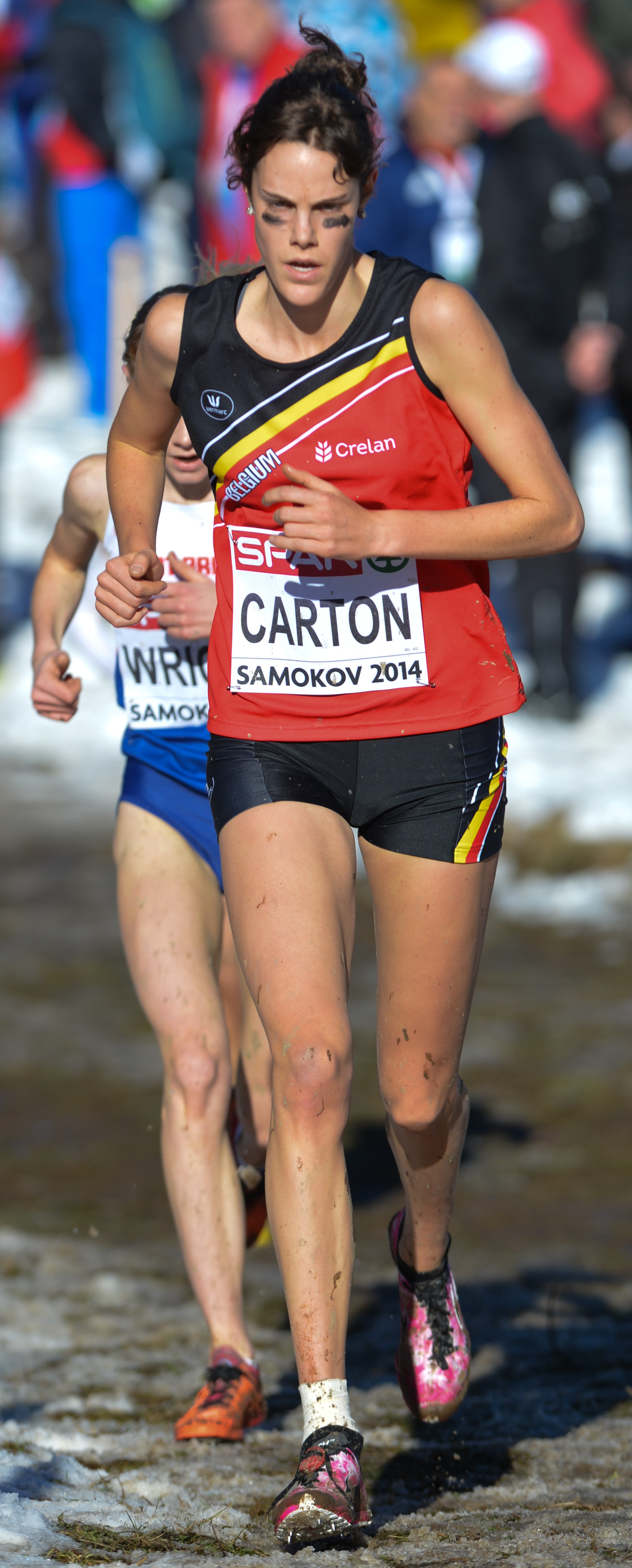
- Carton at the 2014 European Cross Country Championships

Personal information
- Born: 16 April 1994 (age 32)

Sport
- Country: Belgium
- Sport: Athletics
Medal record
European Cross Country Championships
Gold medal – first place	2015 Hyères	U23
U23 European Championships
Silver medal – second place	2015 Tallinn	5000 m

Louise Carton (born 16 April 1994) is a Belgian athlete who competes in cross-country long-distance running.

== Cross-country career ==
In 2014-15 she won the Lotto Cross Cup title. This victory included multiple wins on the circuit.

In 2015, 2016 and 2017, she won the Belgian cross country national championship.

Additionally, she won the U23 championship at the 2015 European Cross Country Championships with the narrowest victory in race history, winning by a fraction of a second.

== Track career ==
She was runner-up in the 5000 meter at the 2015 European Athletics U23 Championships.

She finished 8th at the 2015 KBC Night of Athletics in the 5000 meters with a time of 15:23.82 and this time was lower than the qualifying standard for the 2016 Olympics by .18 seconds.

At the 2016 Olympics, she finished 11th in her heat and did not advance.

== Awards ==
All these accomplishments in 2015 lead to her winning the Golden Spike award as the most promising female athlete in Belgium.
