= Top of the World Reservoir =

Artificial lake in California

Richard Jahraus Top of the World Reservoir
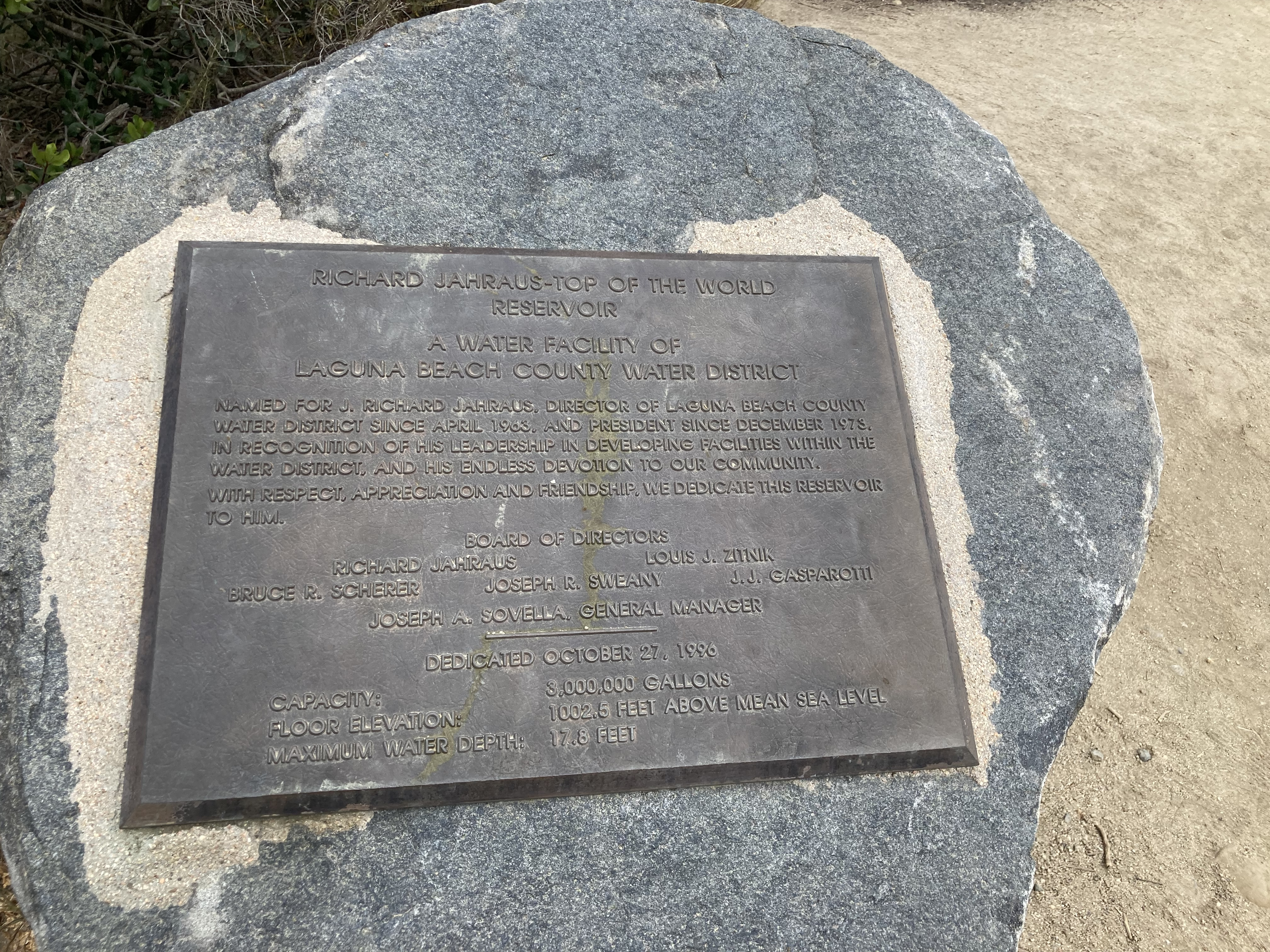
- Plaque on the hill above the reservoir

- Location within the Los Angeles metropolitan area Location within California Location within the United States
- Location: Laguna Beach, California
- Coordinates: 33.5581°N 117.7610°W
- Type: Reservoir
- Etymology: Director and president of Laguna Beach Water District
- Built: August 16, 1996
- Surface area: 3.5 acres (1.4 ha)
- Max. depth: 17.8 ft (5.4 m)
- Surface elevation: 1,002.5 ft (305.6 m)

The Top of the World Reservoir, officially the Richard Jahraus Top of the World Reservoir is an artificial lake in Laguna Beach, California. Dedicated on October 27, 1996, it was named after J. Richard Jahraus, the current Director and President of the Laguna Beach County Water District at the Time. It has a capacity of 3,000,000 US gal (2,500,000 imp gal). Its main use is to supply water for authorities to fight against wildfires, with the high elevation allowing water circulation despite power outages. The lake is underground in a tank, below the Alta Laguna Park.

== History ==
Construction began on the lake in early August 1995, costing $3.9 million at the time. The water district board awarded the contract on July 14, and the planning commission previously approved construction in September 1994. The project was set into action after the Laguna Beach Fire, which destroyed 441 homes. Firemen were unable to stop it sooner due to a lack of water available. It was completed a year later, in August 1996.

== Controversy ==
The project was objected to by environmentalists who complained about the loss of open space, as the neighborhood the reservoir was being built in, the Top of the World, had to close a few hiking trails in its Alta Laguna Park due to construction occurring.
