= Portola High School (Irvine, California) =

Public high school in Irvine, California

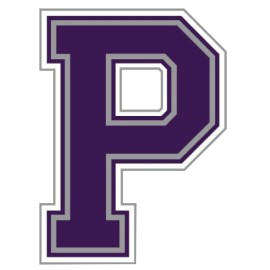
- The Portola "P"

Location
- 1001 Cadence; Irvine, Orange County, California 92618; United States
- Coordinates: 33.6729°N 117.7132°W

Information
- School type: High school
- Established: August 25, 2016
- Status: Open
- School district: Irvine Unified School District
- NCES District ID: 0684500
- Superintendent: Cassie Parham
- CEEB code: 050266
- Principal: John Pehrson
- Teaching staff: 95.37 (FTE)
- Grades: 9-12
- Enrollment: 2,503 (2023-2024)
- Student to teacher ratio: 26.25
- Language: English
- Hours in school day: 7-7.5 Hours
- Campus size: 43 acres (0.17 km^{2})
- Colors: Purple, black, silver
- Athletics conference: Pacific Coast League
- Mascot: Buster the Bulldog
- Nickname: Bulldogs
- Rival: Northwood High School
- Newspaper: Portola Pilot
- Website: portolahigh.iusd.org
- Last updated: December 16th, 2023

Portola High School (PHS) is one of five public high schools in the Irvine Unified School District (IUSD) and is located in Irvine, California. The groundbreaking ceremony was held in October 2014 and the school opened in August 2016. The campus is situated on 42 acres (0.17 km^{2}) of land and can accommodate approximately 2,600 students.

== Student body ==
The school opened in August 2016 with 400 ninth-grade students. In each successive year, a new grade level was added, ninth and tenth grade students attending in 2017–2018, grades 9–11 in 2018–2019, and grades 9–12 starting in the 2019–2020 school year.

== Campus ==
Portola's campus is located on land formerly occupied by the Irvine Ranch and Marine Corps Air Station El Toro. It was constructed to meet criteria established by the Collaborative for High Performance Schools.

== Physical features ==
PHS contains specialized buildings outside of normal classrooms. These features come in part from IUSD's Educational Specifications.

=== Innovation Lab ===
The Innovation Lab, a.k.a. The Student Commons, is run through the staff in the library and contains multiple methods and machines to produce products using multiple formats such as plastic, metal, wood, etc.

=== Layout ===
The school is laid out in groups of buildings:

- Visual and Performing Arts
- Theater
- Stadium and associated buildings
- Science Building
- Math Building
- English and foreign language classes
- Administration and food services

Classroom building groups are linked on the second story by walkways.

Many spaces have multiple uses; the cost savings allowed for the construction of a theater, a multipurpose stadium, and an aquatics center in the first phase rather than in a later expansion.

=== Learning Commons ===
The Learning Commons functions as the school library, containing databases that students can use for research, multimedia resources including two TVs, and also provides a study space. It is separated from the Student Union by a retractable glass wall; they can be combined to provide space for events.

== Athletics ==
Portola High School's athletic teams, known as the Bulldogs, compete in the California Interscholastic Federation/Southern Section. Portola participates in the following sports: baseball, basketball, cross country, gridiron football, golf, lacrosse, pep squad, soccer, softball, swimming/diving, tennis, track and field, volleyball, water polo, and wrestling. Portola competes in the Pacific Coast League in all sports, except for gridiron football, in which they compete in the Pacific Hills conference of Pacific Coast League. On April 17, 2020, the athletics program received the "1st Team Safe Sports School Award" from the National Athletic Trainers’ Association for "...excellence in athlete safety". Portola was the first and, as of 2020, only school in IUSD to acquire the title.

== Student life ==
=== Sports ===
Lacking a traditional inter-class competitiveness, the Portola staff established a house system. There were four houses, which compete for points: Orion, Poseidon, Hercules, and Pegasus. The Associated Student Body (ASB) of Portola High School was in charge of creating and hosting competitions and events which give students the opportunity to earn house points. During the 2020–2021 school year, Portola High School decided to get rid of the house system and establish traditional grade-level competitions in which students were split into Freshmen, Sophomores, Juniors, and Seniors.

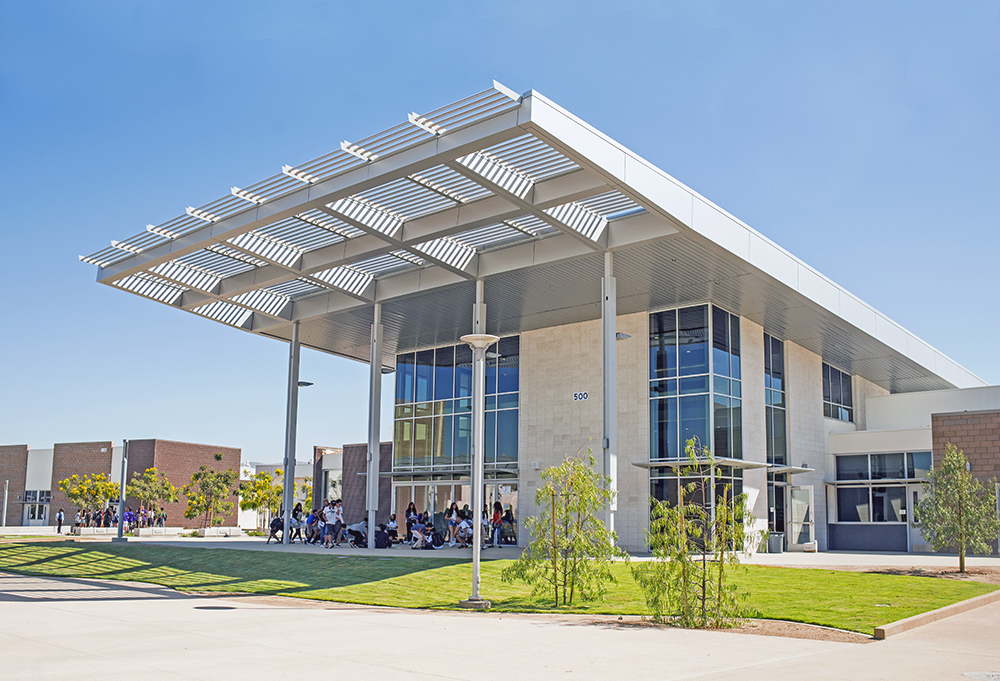
Student Union building at Portola High School in Irvine

=== PNN Broadcasts ===
Portola News Network (PNN) is a biweekly broadcast that informs students about school and community events and entertains an audience of over 2000 people with various student features and other stories.

=== Portola Pilot Newspaper ===
Established in 2016 alongside the school, the Portola Pilot is the school's newspaper. Every month, it prints, publishes, and distributes newspapers to students for free during advisement period. The Portola Pilot is a nationally and locally awarded and recognized paper, as well as serving as Portola High School's official student journalism program. Articles are uploaded multiple times a week on the Pilot's website, portolapilot.com.

== Planning areas served ==
Portola High School serves the northeastern portion of Irvine, California. It serves the planning areas of Woodbury and Portola Springs.

== Awards ==
- "Best of the Best K-12 Education Award" – California – January 30, 2018
- "Best of the Best K-12 Education Award" – National – January 30, 2018
