= Vista Verde School =

Coordinates: 33.6297°N 117.8275°W

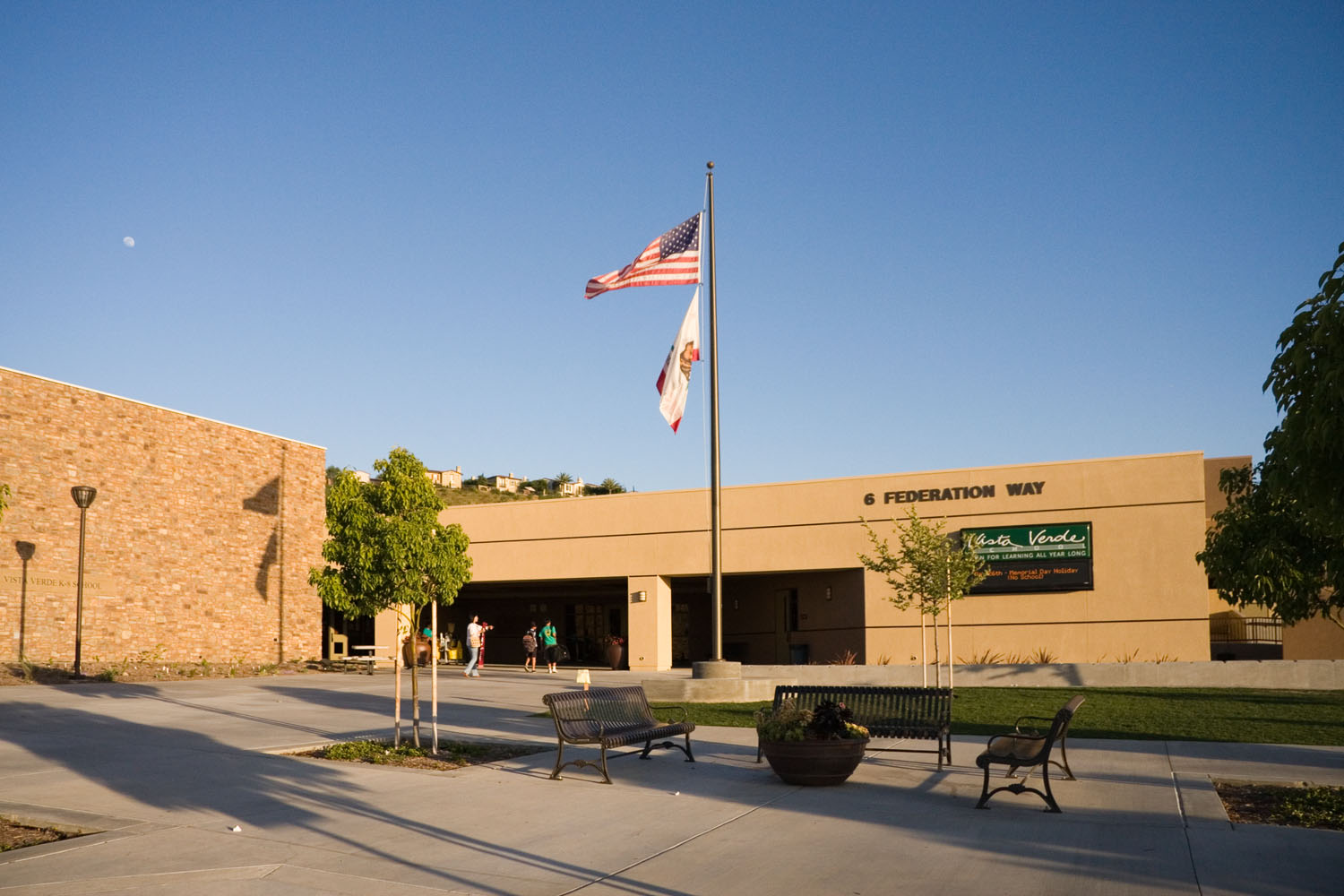

Location
- 6 Federation Way; Irvine, California 92603

Information
- School type: Elementary and Middle
- Founded: 1974
- School board: Irvine Unified School District
- Superintendent: Terry Walker
- Principal: Jerry Vlasic
- Grades: K-5 (Elementary), 6-8 (Middle)year round
- Enrollment: 1048
- Language: English
- Area: Turtle Ridge
- Colors: Green, white, and yellow
- Mascot: Viking
- Team name: Vista Verde Vikings
- Website: Vista Verde School Website

Vista Verde School is a year-round, K-8 school located in the Turtle Ridge neighborhood of Irvine, California, United States. Vista Verde belongs to the Irvine Unified School District but is not a neighborhood school; rather, it is open to all Irvine residents with a preference for Turtle Ridge residents, and is one of four year-round schools in the Irvine district.

== Academic distinctions ==
In 1992, Vista Verde was the highest-scoring school in Orange County, California in the CAP tests. Vista Verde has been recognized multiple times as a Blue Ribbon School of Excellence.

The school was a pioneer in teaching computer literacy; it bought its first computers for student use as early as 1978, and was introducing students to the internet by 1994.

== History ==
Vista Verde opened in 1974 as an elementary school and later became a magnet school. It was originally located in the University Park neighborhood of Irvine. Rosa Drew Lane, a street in Irvine that passes the former campus site in University Park, is named after Rosa Drew, who had been a teacher at Vista Verde for 30 years.

The University Park campus closed and the school moved to the Turtle Ridge campus in 2006. In 2012, the old Vista Verde School site and buildings were sold to a home builder for $17 million. The company subsequently demolished the old school in late 2012 to make room for new homes.
