= On Top of the World =

"On top of the world" is an idiom which means 'exceptionally pleased, happy, or satisfied'. It may also refer to:

== Music ==
=== Albums ===
- On Top of the World (album) or the title song, by 8Ball & MJG, 1995
- On Top of the World, a Pink Floyd bootleg recording, 1970
- On Top of the World, an EP by Milburn, 2002

=== Songs ===
- "(How Does It Feel to Be) On Top of the World", by England United, 1998
- "On Top of the World" (Imagine Dragons song), 2013
- "On Top of the World", by Ari Koivunen, 2007
- "On Top of the World", by Boys Like Girls from Boys Like Girls, 2006
- "On Top of the World", by Cheap Trick from Heaven Tonight, 1978
- "On Top of the World", by Edsilia Rombley representing Netherlands in the Eurovision Song Contest 2007
- "On Top of the World", by Jett Rebel from Venus & Mars, 2014
- "On Top of the World", by John Mayall & the Blues Breakers, recorded in 1966 but not officially released until 2006 on the 40th Anniversary Edition of Blues Breakers with Eric Clapton; covered by the La De Da's, 1966
- "On Top of the World", by T.I. from Paper Trail, 2008

== Other uses ==
- On Top of the World, Florida, US, a census-designated place
- On Top of the World (film), a 1936 British film directed by Redd Davis
- On Top of the World, a 1987 play by Michael Gow

== See also ==
- Top of the World (disambiguation)
