= San Joaquin Hills =

Range of hills in Orange County, California, United States

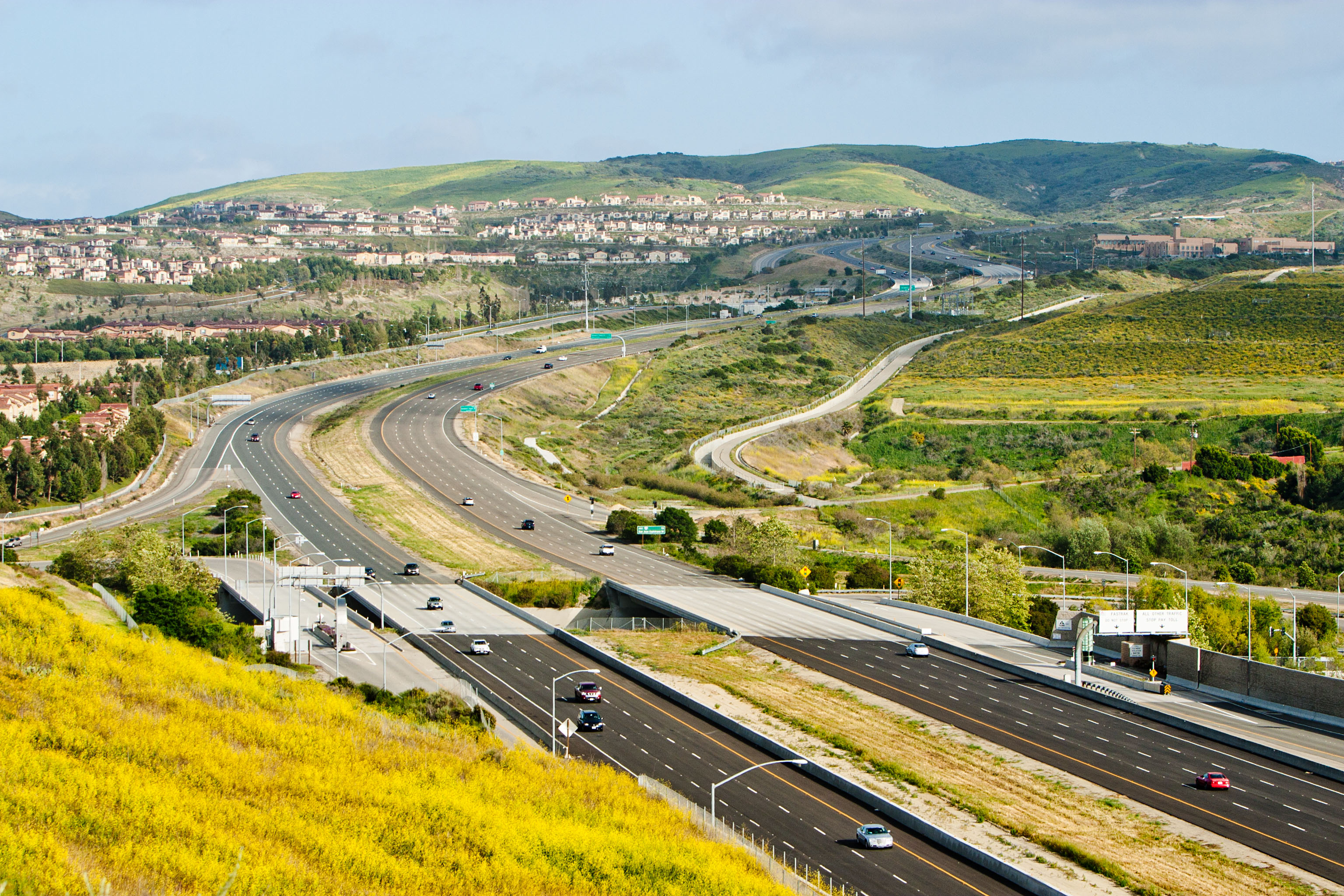
- State Route 73 climbs into the San Joaquin Hills, as seen looking southward from University Hills, Irvine

Highest point
- Peak: Signal Peak
- Elevation: 1,168 ft (356 m)

Geography
- Location within California Location within the United States
- Country: United States
- State: California
- Region: Peninsular Ranges
- District: Orange County
- Range coordinates: 33°36′42.081″N 117°48′33.198″W
- Borders on: Santa Ana Mountains
- Topo map: USGS Laguna Beach

The San Joaquin Hills are a low mountain range of the Peninsular Ranges System, located in coastal Orange County, California.

They extend in a northwest–southeast direction, starting in the northwest in Newport Beach at the southern edge of the Los Angeles Basin, and extending southeast to San Juan Capistrano.

== Geography ==
=== Geology ===
The main ridge of the San Joaquin Hills runs southeast from the Upper Newport Bay area, attaining its maximum height of roughly 1,000 feet (300 m) near Laguna Beach. Many of the high ridges exceed 600 to 800 feet (180 to 240 m) in height. The hills stretch over a distance of about 16 miles (26 km) and can be up to 3 to 4 miles (4.8 to 6.4 km) broad. In many places, the San Joaquin Hills drop directly into the Pacific Ocean, creating the steep sea cliffs that characterize the region.

Streams that originate on the west slope of the range include Buck Gully, Los Trancos Creek, Muddy Creek, El Moro Creek, Emerald Creek, Prima Deshecha Cañada, Segunda Deshecha Cañada, and Christianitos Canyon. The east side is drained by Bonita Creek, Sand Canyon Wash, San Joaquin Wash, and La Cañada Wash. Cities bordering the range include Newport Beach, Irvine, Laguna Hills, Aliso Viejo, Laguna Beach, Laguna Niguel, Dana Point, San Juan Capistrano, and San Clemente.

Scientists have suggested that the San Joaquin Hills have been formed by uplift from a blind thrust fault line lying eight miles below the hills similar to the one that produced the 1994 Northridge Earthquake.

Because of erosion phenomena during the previous Ice Age, the San Joaquin Hills are not one continuous mountain range, but instead are bisected by numerous water gaps cut by rivers flowing southwest from the Santa Ana Mountains. In the north, Newport Bay was formed by the Santa Ana River switching its course to the south, cutting across the northern part of the range. Laguna Canyon was formed by San Diego Creek, but eventually the larger creek changed course and left a wind gap through the hills. The largest canyon by far is Aliso Canyon, cut by Aliso Creek. Further south, the hills dissipate into smaller ridges and are bisected by the canyon of Salt Creek. The southern extent of the hills are cut by San Juan Creek.

==== Named summits ====
Named summits in the San Joaquin Hills include (from north to south) French Hill in Turtle Rock, Irvine; Signal Peak and Pelican Hill, both of which are near the Newport Coast neighborhood of Newport Beach; Temple Hill in Laguna Beach, more commonly known as "Top of the World" after the neighborhood on its peak; and Niguel Hill in Laguna Niguel.

=== Flora and fauna ===
The native vegetation of the hills is in the California coastal sage and chaparral and California chaparral and woodlands ecoregions, largely coastal sage scrub, but other habitat types include grasslands, oak woodlands, wetlands, and riparian habitats along several streams.

In past ages the land that is now the San Joaquin Hills lay under the ocean: construction for the San Joaquin Hills Toll Road unearthed a number of artifacts and more than 40,000 fossils, up to 35 million years old, including 5-million-year-old fossilized whales.

== History ==
Prior to the arrival of Europeans in the area, residents of the nearby Tongva and Acjachemen village of Genga frequented the hills.

The hills take their name from Rancho San Joaquin, owned by Jose Andres Sepulveda. Formed in 1842 by the merger of two smaller ranches, this ranch included the northern part of the hills and likely had Laguna Canyon as its southeastern boundary. Rancho San Joaquin later became part of the Irvine Ranch. Mexican Rancho Niguel was located in the southeastern section of the hills.

The San Joaquin Hills blind thrust may be the source of the earliest recorded earthquake in California, a large earthquake felt in what is now northern Orange County on July 28, 1769, by Gaspar de Portolá.

== Development ==
Two neighborhoods within the San Joaquin Hills take the name of the hills for their own: San Joaquin Hills in Newport Beach, a former census-designated place annexed by that city, and San Joaquin Hills in Laguna Niguel, a master-planned community in that city. Other neighborhoods set in and named after hills in this range include University Hills and Turtle Rock in Irvine.

State Route 73, also called the San Joaquin Hills Toll Road, extends through the length of the hills from Newport Beach to San Juan Capistrano. State Route 133 crosses the hills through Laguna Canyon in Laguna Beach, and they are also crossed in several other places by less major roads.

== See also ==
- Mountain ranges of Orange County, California
- Peninsular Ranges−related topics
