= Temple Hill (Orange County, California) =

Mountain in Orange County, California

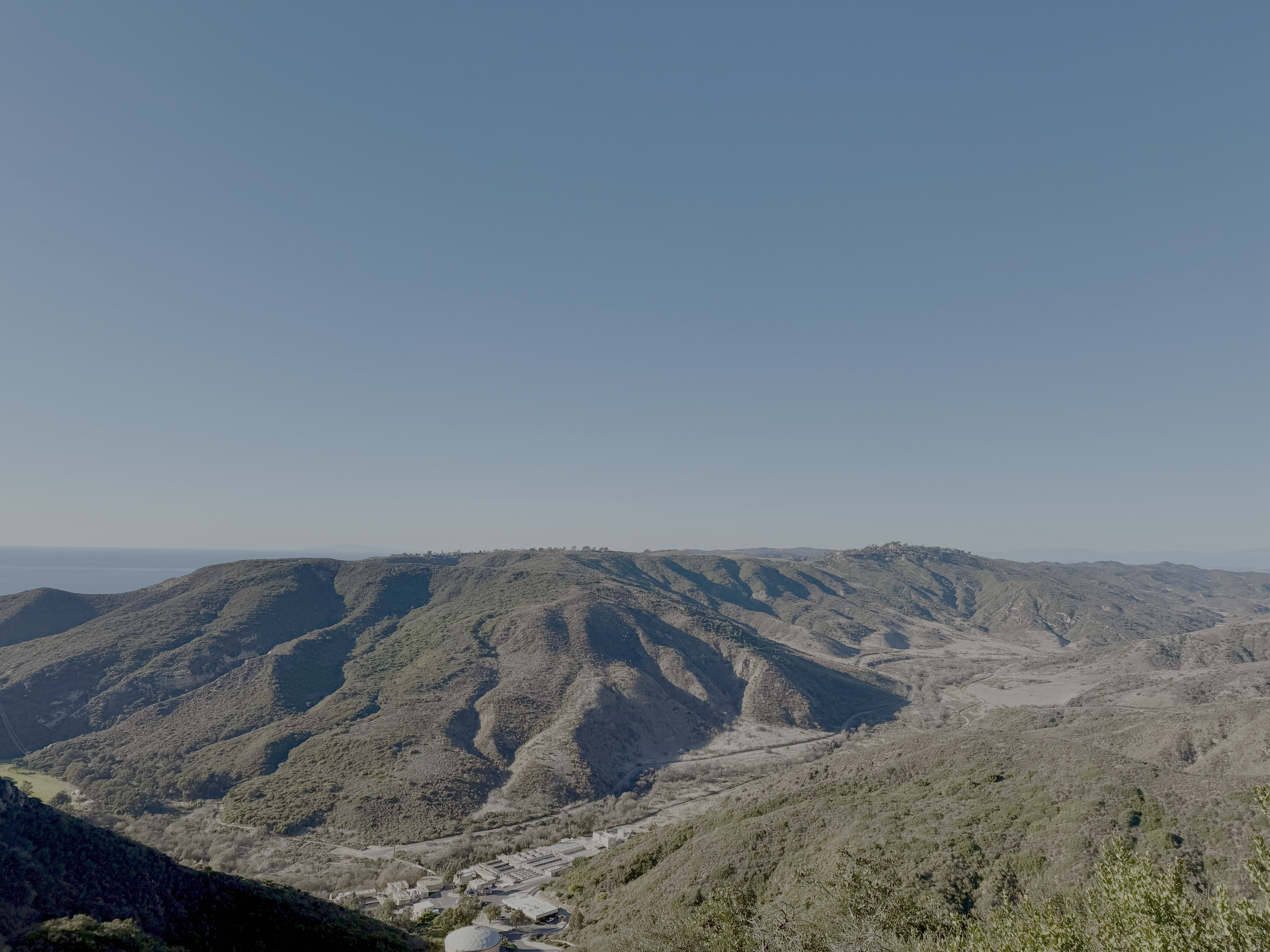

Highest point
- Elevation: 1,038 ft (316 m) NAVD 88
- Prominence: 27,465 ft (8,371 m)
- Coordinates: 33°33′01″N 117°45′17″W

Geography
- Location within California
- Location: Laguna Beach, California, U.S.
- Parent range: San Joaquin Hills
- Topo map: USGS Laguna Beach

Temple Hill is the second-highest peak in the San Joaquin Hills area of Orange County, California, United States. Its elevation is 1,038 ft (316 m). The hill is bordered on the west by Laguna Canyon and on the east by Aliso and Wood Canyons Wilderness Park, to which it provides hiking and biking trailheads. It dominates the southern portion of Laguna Beach between downtown and Aliso Creek. The summit provides views of Saddleback Valley to the east, the Pacific Ocean to the south, and most of Orange County up to the San Gabriel Mountains to the north.

Temple Hill has 7 amateur radio repeaters and a beacon at its summit that are maintained by South Orange Amateur Radio Association
