= Irvine Unified School District =

School district in California, United States

Location
- Irvine, California Orange County United States

District information
- Type: Public
- Established: 1972; 54 years ago
- Superintendent: Cassie Parham

Students and staff
- Students: 38,000
- Teachers: 1,271
- Staff: 838

Other information
- Website: www.iusd.org

Irvine Unified School District is a school district in Irvine, California, United States, that serves most portions of the city of Irvine as well as some parts of Tustin and unincorporated areas of Orange County. Established on June 6, 1972, IUSD serves approximately 36,000 K-12 students at twenty-four elementary schools, six middle schools, five K-8 schools, two virtual academies, and six comprehensive high schools.

Irvine has been frequently recognized among the top school systems in California and the United States. On the state's latest Academic Performance Index, which measures overall achievement on a scale of 200 to 1,000, IUSD posted a districtwide score of 921, marking a five-point increase over the previous year.

Irvine schools have earned the state's highest honor – the label of California Distinguished School – 48 times since 1986, and all four comprehensive high schools have been recognized at least once. All four comprehensive high schools have also earned the distinction as Blue Ribbon Schools, the nation's highest level of recognition for K-12 campuses. In all, IUSD has produced 13 Blue Ribbon schools since 1983.

== Schools ==
=== Elementary schools ===
- Alderwood Elementary School
- Bonita Canyon Elementary School
- Brywood Elementary School
- Canyon View Elementary School
- College Park Elementary School
- Culverdale Elementary School
- Cypress Village Elementary School
- Deerfield Elementary School
- Eastshore Elementary School
- Eastwood Elementary School
- Greentree Elementary School
- Loma Ridge Elementary School
- Meadow Park Elementary School
- Northwood Elementary School
- Oak Creek Elementary School
- Portola Springs Elementary School
- Santiago Hills Elementary School
- Springbrook Elementary School
- Stone Creek Elementary School
- Stonegate Elementary School
- Turtle Rock Elementary School
- University Park Elementary School
- Westpark Elementary School
- Woodbury Elementary School

=== K-8 schools ===
- Beacon Park School
- Cadence Park School
- Plaza Vista School
- Solis Park School
- Vista Verde School

=== Middle schools ===
- Jeffrey Trail Middle School
- Lakeside Middle School
- Rancho San Joaquin Middle School
- Sierra Vista Middle School
- South Lake Middle School
- Venado Middle School

=== High schools ===
- Creekside High School (continuation)
- Irvine High School
- Northwood High School
- Portola High School
- University High School
- Woodbridge High School

=== Other Schools ===
- Early Childhood Learning Center
- Irvine Adult School
- Irvine Adult Transition Program
- Irvine Home School
- Irvine Virtual Academy

== See also ==
- List of school districts in Orange County, California
