= Belgian Cross Country Championships =

- Date: February/March
- Location: Various, Belgium
- Event type: Cross country
- Distance: 12 km and 4 km for men 8 km and 4 km for women
- Established: 1896

The Belgian Cross Country Championships (Dutch: Belgische kampioenschappen veldlopen) is an annual cross country running organised by the Royal Belgian Athletics League that serves as the national championship for the sport in Belgium. It was usually held in February or March until 2023 but from there on out, the championships are organized in the autumn, usually in November.

It was first held in 1896 for men only. A separate women's championship was created in 1970 and the national championship races for both sexes were held in conjunction from 1988 onwards. A short race was added to the programme in 1992, which served as with national selection for that section at the IAAF World Cross Country Championships from 1998 to 2006.

Guest athletes from other nations occasionally compete at the competition, but are not eligible for the national title. Several guests have gone on to place first in the race. In the men's long race New Zealand's Gavin Thorley in 1971, Burundi's Hilaire Ntirampeba in 2000 and Ethiopia's Faisa Dame Tasama in 2007 and 2013. In the women's long race, Lithuania's Stefanija Statkuvienė in 1996 and Ethiopia's Mimi Belete in 2008. The 2012 men's short race was won by Morocco's Abdellah Dacha.

== Editions ==
=== Men's championship ===
Year	Date	Location	Winner
1896	26 April	Ter Kameren	Charles Van der Beeken
1897	18 April	Ter Kameren	Jules Lesage
1898	13 March	Ter Kameren	Jules Lesage
1899	23 April	Ter Kameren	Jules Lesage
1900	18 March	Ter Kameren	Jules Lesage
1901		Ter Kameren	Jules Lesage
1902	16 March	Ter Kameren	Charles Mertens
1903	29 March	Ter Kameren	Jules Lesage
1904	6 March	Ter Kameren	Charles Mertens
1905	5 March	Ter Kameren	Charles Mertens
1906	4 March	Ter Kameren	Antoine Doyen
1907	10 March	Brussels	François Delloye
1908	8 March	Brussels	François Delloye
1909	14 March	Uccle (Ganzenvijver)	François Delloye
1910	20 March	Uccle (Ganzenvijver)	François Delloye
1911	2 April	Antwerp	François Delloye
1912	3 March	Liège	François Delloye
1913	2 March	Gentbrugge	François Delloye
1914	1 March	Karreveld	Isidore Vignol
1919	13 April	Schaerbeek	Julien Van Campenhout
1920	14 March	Stokkel	Auguste Broos
1921	6 March	Bosvoorde	Marcel Alavoine
1922	19 March	Bosvoorde	Auguste Broos
1923	4 March	Bosvoorde	Georges Vandenbroele
1924	2 March	Bosvoorde	Julien Van Campenhout
1925	1 March	Bosvoorde	Alfred De Fleurquin
1926	14 March	Stokkel	Leon Degrande
1927	13 March	Stokkel	Leon Degrande
1928	11 March	Stokkel	Leon Degrande
1929	17 March	Stokkel	Leon Degrande
1930	9 March	Stokkel	René Geeraert
1931	15 March	Stokkel	René Geeraert
1932	28 February	Stokkel	Maurice Maréchal
1933	12 March	Stokkel	Jan Linsen
1934	11 March	Stokkel	Victor Honorez
1935	10 March	Stokkel	Victor Honorez
1936	8 March	Stokkel	Eduard Schroeven
1937	7 March	Stokkel	Oscar Van Rumst
1938	20 March	Stokkel	Oscar Van Rumst
1939	12 March	Stokkel	Jan Chapelle
1940	3 March	Bosvoorde	Jan Chapelle
1941	30 March	Forest	Eduard Schroeven
1942	12 April	Bosvoorde	Eduard Schroeven
1943	21 March	Bosvoorde	Gaston Reiff
1944	19 March	Bosvoorde	Gaston Reiff
1945	11 March	Bosvoorde	Jan Chapelle
1946	3 March	Bosvoorde	Jan Chapelle
1947	1 March	Bosvoorde	Gaston Reiff
1948	13 March	Bosvoorde	Marcel Vandewattyne
1949	12 March	Bosvoorde	Marcel Vandewattyne
1950	4 March	Bosvoorde	Lucien Theys
1951	10 March	Laeken	Marcel Vandewattyne
1952	9 March	Waregem	Marcel Vandewattyne
1953	8 March	Waregem	Lucien Theys
1954	14 March	Waregem	Lucien Hanswijk
1955	6 March	Waregem	Marcel Vandewattyne
1956	4 March	Bosvoorde	Frans Herman
1957	10 March	Waregem	Marcel Vandewattyne
1958	2 March	Waregem	Raymond Vandenborre
1959	1 March	Waregem	Gaston Roelants
1960	28 February	Waregem	Hedwig Leenaert
1961	5 March	Waregem	Gaston Roelants
1962	11 March	Waregem	Gaston Roelants
1963	3 March	Waregem	Gaston Roelants
1964	8 March	Waregem	Gaston Roelants
1965	7 March	Ostend	Rik Clerckx
1966	6 March	Waregem	Gaston Roelants
1967	5 March	Waregem	Gaston Roelants
1968	3 March	Waregem	Gaston Roelants
1969	9 March	Waregem	Gaston Roelants
1970	8 March	Waregem	Gaston Roelants
1971	7 March	Waregem	Willy Polleunis
1972	5 March	Waregem	Gaston Roelants
1973	4 March	Waregem	Willy Polleunis
1974	3 March	Waregem	Erik De Beck
1975	2 March	Waregem	Emiel Puttemans
1976	15 February	Waregem	Erik De Beck
1977	6 March	Waregem	Karel Lismont
1978	5 March	Waregem	Willy Polleunis
1979	4 March	Waregem	Léon Schots
1980	24 February	Waregem	Karel Lismont
1981	8 March	Hechtel	Emiel Puttemans
1982	28 February	Waregem	Léon Schots
1983	27 February	Hechtel	Léon Schots
1984	4 March	Hechtel	Vincent Rousseau
1985	10 March	Heusden-Zolder	Jef Gees
1986	9 March	Waregem	Eddy De Pauw
1987	1 March	Mol	Vincent Rousseau

=== Women's championship ===
Year	Date	Location	Winner
1921	6 March	Bosvoorde	Elvire Berlémont
1922	26 March	Molenbeek-Saint-Jean	Louise Gits
1923	4 March	Bosvoorde	Ida Degrande
1924	9 March	Molenbeek-Saint-Jean	Ida Degrande
1925	15 March	Laeken	Ida Degrande
1926			Ida Degrande
1927	27 March	Uccle	Ida Degrande
1928	26 February	Leopold Park	Ida Degrande
1929	24 March	Ganshoren	Ida Degrande
1930	9 March	Ter Kameren	Julia Vandevelde
1931	8 March	Laeken	Julia Vandevelde
1932	13 March	Dilbeek	José Mariani
1933	19 March	Dilbeek	Julia Vandevelde
1934	18 March	Dilbeek	Julia Vandevelde
1935	31 March	Dilbeek	Jeanne Pousset
1936	5 April	Woluwe-Saint-Pierre	Jeanne Pousset
1937	4 April	Schaerbeek	Helene Van Mol
1938	6 March	Dilbeek	Jeanne Pousset
1939	26 March	Dilbeek	Jeanne Pousset
1940	10 March	Dilbeek	Mimi Simon
1941	9 March	Dilbeek	Jenny Van Gerdinge
1944	19 March	Dilbeek	Aimée Knaepen
1945	25 March	Dilbeek	Augusta Burlet
1946	17 March	Dilbeek	Aimée Knaepen
1947	23 March	Dilbeek	Georgette Grumiaux
1948	14 March	Dilbeek	Georgette Grumiaux
1949	13 March	Berchem-Sainte-Agathe	Marie Vissers
1970	22 February	Vilvoorde	Marie-Claire Decroix
1971	28 February	Vilvoorde	Joske Van Santberghe
1972	27 February	Vilvoorde	Joske Van Santberghe
1973	25 February	Vilvoorde	Joske Van Santberghe
1974	24 February	Vilvoorde	Joske Van Santberghe
1975	23 February	Vilvoorde	Magda Ilands
1976	8 February	Vilvoorde	Viviane Van Emelen
1977	27 February	Sint-Katelijne-Waver	Marleen Mols
1978	26 February	Wingene	Marleen Mols
1979	25 February	Wingene	Francine Peeters
1980	17 February	Vorselaar	Magda Ilands
1981	1 March	Vorselaar	Marie-Christine Deurbroeck
1982	21 February	Waregem	Magda Ilands
1983	20 February	Vorselaar	Francine Peeters
1984	11 March	Heusden-Zolder	Francine Peeters
1985	24 February	Woluwe-Saint-Lambert	Betty Vansteenbroek
1986	2 March	Woluwe-Saint-Lambert	Corinne Debaets
1987	8 March	Woluwe-Saint-Lambert	Véronique Collard

=== Combined championship ===
Year	Date	Location	Men's long race winner	Women's long race winner	Men's short race winner	Women's short race winner	Ref
1988	28 February	Ostend	Vincent Rousseau	Véronique Collard	—N/a	—N/a	
1989	12 February	Waregem	Jos Maes	Véronique Collard	—N/a	—N/a	
1990	11 March	Amay	Vincent Rousseau	Véronique Collard	—N/a	—N/a	
1991	3 March	Antwerp	Vincent Rousseau	Lieve Slegers	—N/a	—N/a	
1992	8 March	Averbode	Vincent Rousseau	Lieve Slegers	Christophe Impens	Linda Berghmans	
1993	14 March	Mechelen	Vincent Rousseau	Véronique Collard	Bart Meganck	Laurence Robaert	
1994	6 March	Monceau-sur-Sambre	Vincent Rousseau	Lieve Slegers	Rudy Vlasselaer	Maria Byczkowska	
1995	5 March	Waregem	Vincent Rousseau	Lieve Slegers	Rudy Vlasselaer	Els VanCollie	
1996	3 March	Monceau-sur-Sambre	William Van Dijck	Anne-Marie Danneels	Frederic Desmedt	Els VanCollie	
1997	2 March	Averbode	Mohammed Mourhit	Anja Smolders	Francois Carpentier	Els Verthé	
1998	8 March	Ostend	Mohammed Mourhit	Anja Smolders	Wouter Van den Broek	Els VanCollie	
1999	14 March	Ostend	Mohammed Mourhit	Anja Smolders	Luc Bernart	Els VanCollie	
2000	12 March	Ostend	Jerry Van den Eede	Anja Smolders	Patrick Grammens	Véronique Collard	
2001	18 March	Ostend	Tom Van Hooste	Anja Smolders	Jurgen Vandewiele	Véronique Collard	
2002	10 March	Ostend	Tom Van Hooste	Anja Smolders	Ridouane Es Saadi	Véronique Collard	
2003	9 March	Ostend	Tom Van Hooste	Fatiha Baouf	Ridouane Es Saadi	Veerle Dejaeghere	
2004	7 March	Ostend	Tom Compernolle	Anja Smolders	Ridouane Es Saadi	Mieke Geens	
2005	27 February	Ostend	Tom Van Hooste	Mounia Aboulahcen	Mario Van Waeyenberge	Liesbeth Van de Velde	
2006	12 March	Ostend	Pieter Desmet	Nathalie De Vos	Mario Van Waeyenberge	Sylvie Verthé	
2007	11 March	Ostend	Rik Ceulemans	Nathalie De Vos	Dries Busselot	Sigrid Vanden Bempt	
2008	9 March	Ostend	Tom Van Hooste	Elke Van Hoeymissen	Kim Ruell	Barbara Maveau	
2009	1 March	Ostend	Atelaw Yeshetela Bekele	Veerle Dejaeghere	Kim Ruell	Veerle Van Linden	
2010	14 March	Ostend	Pieter Desmet	Veerle Dejaeghere	Wesley De Kerpel	Sigrid Vanden Bempt	
2011	13 March	Ostend	Atelaw Yeshetela Bekele	Veerle Dejaeghere	Wesley De Kerpel	Anne-Sophie Maréchal	
2012	11 March	Ostend	Bashir Abdi	Veerle Dejaeghere	Pieter-Jan Hannes	Katrijn Vande Riviere	
2013	10 March	Ostend	Koen Naert	Almensh Belete	Pieter-Jan Hannes	Sigrid Vanden Bempt	
2014	9 March	Wachtebeke	Jeroen D'hoedt	Veerle Dejaeghere	Pieter-Jan Hannes	Sophie Van Accom	
2015	15 March	Wachtebeke	Isaac Kimeli	Louise Carton	Ismael Debjani	Zenobie Van Gansbeke	
2016	13 March	Wachtebeke	Jeroen D'hoedt	Louise Carton	Sam Valgaeren	Lisa Rooms	
2017	12 March	Wachtebeke	Isaac Kimeli	Louise Carton	Ali Hamdi	Zenobie Vangansbeke	
2018	25 February	Laeken	Isaac Kimeli	Imana Truyers	Jeroen D'hoedt	Renée Eykens	
2019	24 February	Laeken	Soufiane Bouchikhi	Hanna Vandenbussche	Ali Hamdi	Elise Vanderelst	
2020	1 March	Laeken	Soufiane Bouchikhi	Sofie Van Accom	Robin Hendrix	Jenna Wyns	
2021	28 February	Laeken	John Heymans	Mieke Gorissen	Ruben Querinjean	Lotte Scheldeman	
2022	6 March	Laeken	Michael Somers	Mieke Gorissen	Ruben Querinjean	Elise Vanderelst	
2023	26 February	Brussel	Isaac Kimeli	Lisa Rooms	Stijn Baeten	Marie Bilo	
2023-2024	19 November	Hulshout	Isaac Kimeli	Chloé Herbiet	Ruben Verheyden	Elise Vanderelst	
2024-2025	17 November	Hulshout	Isaac Kimeli	Jana Van Lent	Antoine Sénard	Eline Dalemans	
2025-2026	30 November	Hulshout	Ruben Querinjean	Lisa Rooms	Antoine Sénard	Laure Bilo	
