= Lotto Cross Cup =

The Lotto Cross Cup is an annual series of international cross country running competitions in Belgium. The inaugural season was in 1982–1983. The series comprises Belgium's foremost cross country competitions, including the IAAF permit meeting in Brussels (Lotto Cross Cup Brussels) and the European Athletics sanctioned meeting in Roeselare (Lotto Cross Cup van West-Vlaanderen) – Belgium's only world and European level meetings.

The series previously featured six meetings (legs), but this expanded after 2003 and by 2009 the series had eight competitions in its schedule. The series typically begins in October and concludes in March. Throughout the series, athletes can earn points based on their performance, ranging from 25 points for first place and one point for fifteenth place. These points are then combined at the end of the series and the male and female athletes with the greatest totals are declared the winners.

In addition to the main men's and women's senior races, there are junior, masters and student competitions, as well as an under-23s competition sponsored by EuroMillions. There are also short-course cross country competitions, which are worth half the prize money of the longer races.

The series attracts mainly Belgian athletes, although British athlete Roger Hackney won the men's series in the 1988–89 edition. Furthermore, the meetings in Brussels, Roeselare and Hannut often attract many high-calibre international athletes.

== Competitions ==
Lotto Cross Cup 2009–10 calendar
Leg	Date	Meeting	Location	City	Status
1st	25 October	Lotto Cross Cup Gent	Blaarmeersen	Ghent	
2nd	7 November	Lotto Cross Cup Mol	Provinciaal Domein Zilvermeer	Mol	
3rd	29 November	Lotto Cross Cup van West-Vlaanderen	Schiervelde Stadion	Roeselare	EAA meeting
4th	20 December	Lotto Cross Cup Brussels	Park van Laken	Brussels	IAAF permit meeting
5th	3 January	Lotto Cross Cup Hulshout	Sportcentrum Sportiva	Hulshout	
6th	14 February	Lotto Cross Cup Hannut	Stade Lucien Gustin	Hannut	
7th	27 February	Lotto Cross Cup Dour	Site de la Machine à Feu	Dour	
8th	14 March	Lotto Cross Cup Ostend	De Schorre (Quartier Stene)	Ostend	Lotto Cross Cup Final/ Belgian Cross Country Championships

Past meetings
Meeting	Location	City	Years
Lotto Cross Cup Wachtebeke	Provinciaal Domein Puyenbroeck	Wachtebeke	2005, 2006

== Past series winners ==
Season	Men's winner	Women's winner	Men's short race winner	Women's short race winner	Men's U-23 winner
1982–83	(Belgium) Leon Schots	—	—	—	—
1983–84	(Belgium) Vincent Rousseau	(Belgium) Francine Peeters	—	—	—
1984–85	(Belgium) Vincent Rousseau	(Belgium) Betty van Steenbroek	—	—	—
1985–86	(Belgium) Vincent Rousseau	(Belgium) Betty van Steenbroek	—	—	—
1986–87	(Belgium) Vincent Rousseau	(Belgium) Ingrid Delagrange	—	—	—
1987–88	(Belgium) Vincent Rousseau	(Belgium) Véronique Collard	—	—	—
1988–89	(United Kingdom) Roger Hackney	(Belgium) Véronique Collard	—	—	—
1989–90	(Belgium) Ruddy Walem	(Belgium) Ingrid Delagrange	—	—	—
1990–91	(Belgium) Vincent Rousseau	(Belgium) Véronique Collard	—	—	—
1991–92	(Belgium) Vincent Rousseau	(Belgium) Lieve Slegers	—	—	—
1992–93	(Belgium) Vincent Rousseau	(Belgium) Ingrid Delagrange	—	—	—
1993–94	(Belgium) William Van Dijck	(Belgium) Ingrid Delagrange	—	—	—
1994–95	(Belgium) Ruddy Walem	(Belgium) Lieve Slegers	—	—	—
1995–96	(Belgium) William Van Dijck	(Lithuania) Stefanija Statkuviené	—	—	—
1996–97	(Belgium) Mohammed Mourhit	(Belgium) Marleen Renders	—	—	—
1997–98	(Belgium) Mohammed Mourhit	(Belgium) Veerle Dejaeghere	—	—	—
1998–99	(Belgium) Ruddy Walem	(Belgium) Anja Smolders	—	—	—
1999–2000	(Belgium) Tom Compernolle	(Belgium) Veerle Dejaeghere	—	—	—
2000–01	(Belgium) Tom van Hooste	(Belgium) Anja Smolders	—	—	—
2001–02	(Belgium) Tom van Hooste	(Belgium) Anja Smolders	(Belgium) Tim Clerbout	—	—
2002–03	(Belgium) Tom van Hooste	(Belgium) Fatiha Baouf	(Belgium) Ridouane Es-Saadi	—	—
2003–04	(Belgium) Tom van Hooste	(Belgium) Veerle Dejaeghere	(Belgium) Ridouane Es-Saadi	—	—
2004–05	(Belgium) Tom van Hooste	(Belgium) Veerle Dejaeghere	(Belgium) Tim Clerbout	—	(Belgium) Pieter Desmet
2005–06	(Belgium) Tom van Hooste	(Belgium) Veerle Dejaeghere	(Belgium) Dries Busselot	—	(Belgium) Kristof Mouton
2006–07	(Belgium) Pieter Desmet	(Belgium) Veerle Dejaeghere	(Belgium) Dries Busselot	—	(Belgium) Michael Brandenbourg
2007–08	(Belgium) Pieter Desmet	(Belgium) Veerle Dejaeghere	(Belgium) Kim Ruell	—	(Belgium) Sanne Torfs
2008–09	(Belgium) Pieter Desmet	(Belgium) Veerle Dejaeghere	(Belgium) Kim Ruell	—	(Belgium) Atelaw Yeshetela Bekele
2009–10	(Belgium) Pieter Desmet	(Belgium) Veerle Dejaeghere	(Belgium) Wesley De Kerpel	—	(Belgium) Sanne Torfs
2010–11	(Belgium) Jeroen D'Hoedt	(Belgium) Veerle Dejaeghere	(Belgium) Tom Van Rooy	—	(Belgium) Jeroen D'Hoedt
2011–12	(Belgium) Atelaw Yeshetela Bekele	(Belgium) Veerle Dejaeghere	(Belgium) Maarten Van Steen	—	(Belgium) Koen Naert
2012–13	(Belgium) Koen Naert	(Belgium) Veerle Dejaeghere	(Belgium) Kim Ruell	—	(Belgium) Dries Basemans
2013–14	(Belgium) Jeroen D'Hoedt	(Belgium) Veerle Dejaeghere	(Belgium) Isaac Kimeli	—	(Belgium) Dries Basemans
2014–15	(Belgium) Isaac Kimeli	(Belgium) Louise Carton	(Belgium) Franky Hernould	—	(Belgium) Isaac Kimeli
2015–16	(Belgium) Isaac Kimeli	(Belgium) Louise Carton	(Belgium) Dieter Kersten	—	(Belgium) Isaac Kimeli
2016–17	(Belgium) Isaac Kimeli	(Belgium) Louise Carton	(Belgium) Ismael Debjani	—	(Belgium) Dieter Kersten
2017–18	(Belgium) Souffiane Bouchiki	(Belgium) Imana Truyers	(Belgium) Jeroen D'Hoedt	—	(Belgium) Simon Debognies
2018–19	(Belgium) Isaac Kimeli	(Belgium) Nina Lauwaert	(Belgium) Valère Hustin	—	(Belgium) Dorian Boulvin
2019–20	(Belgium) Dieter Kersten	(Belgium) Hanna Verbruggen	(Belgium) Robin Hendrix	—	(Belgium) Tim Van de Velde
2020–21	(Belgium) John Heymans	(Belgium) Mieke Gorissen	(Belgium) Ruben Querinjean	—	(Belgium) Guillaume Grimard
2021–22	(Belgium) Michael Somers	(Belgium) Mieke Gorissen	(Belgium) Ruben Querinjean	(Belgium) Elise Vanderelst	(Belgium) Arnaud Collard
2022–23	(Belgium) Isaac Kimeli	(Belgium) Lisa Rooms	(Belgium) Maxim Delvoie	(Belgium) Mariska Parewyck	(Belgium) Yorick Van De Kerkhove
2023–24	(Belgium) Guillaume Grimard	(Belgium) Jana Van Lent	(Belgium) Audah Ziad	(Belgium) Charlotte Van Hese	(Belgium) Noah Konteh
2024–25	(Belgium) Ruben Querinjean	(Belgium) Chloé Herbiet	(Belgium) Antoine Sénard	(Belgium) Marie Bilo	(Belgium) Tristan Gevaert
2025–26	(Belgium) Ruben Querinjean	(Belgium) Lisa Rooms	(Belgium) Tibaut Vandelannoote	(Belgium) Laure Bilo	(Belgium) Mathis Lievens
