= Lotto Cross Cup Brussels =

Annual cross country running competition

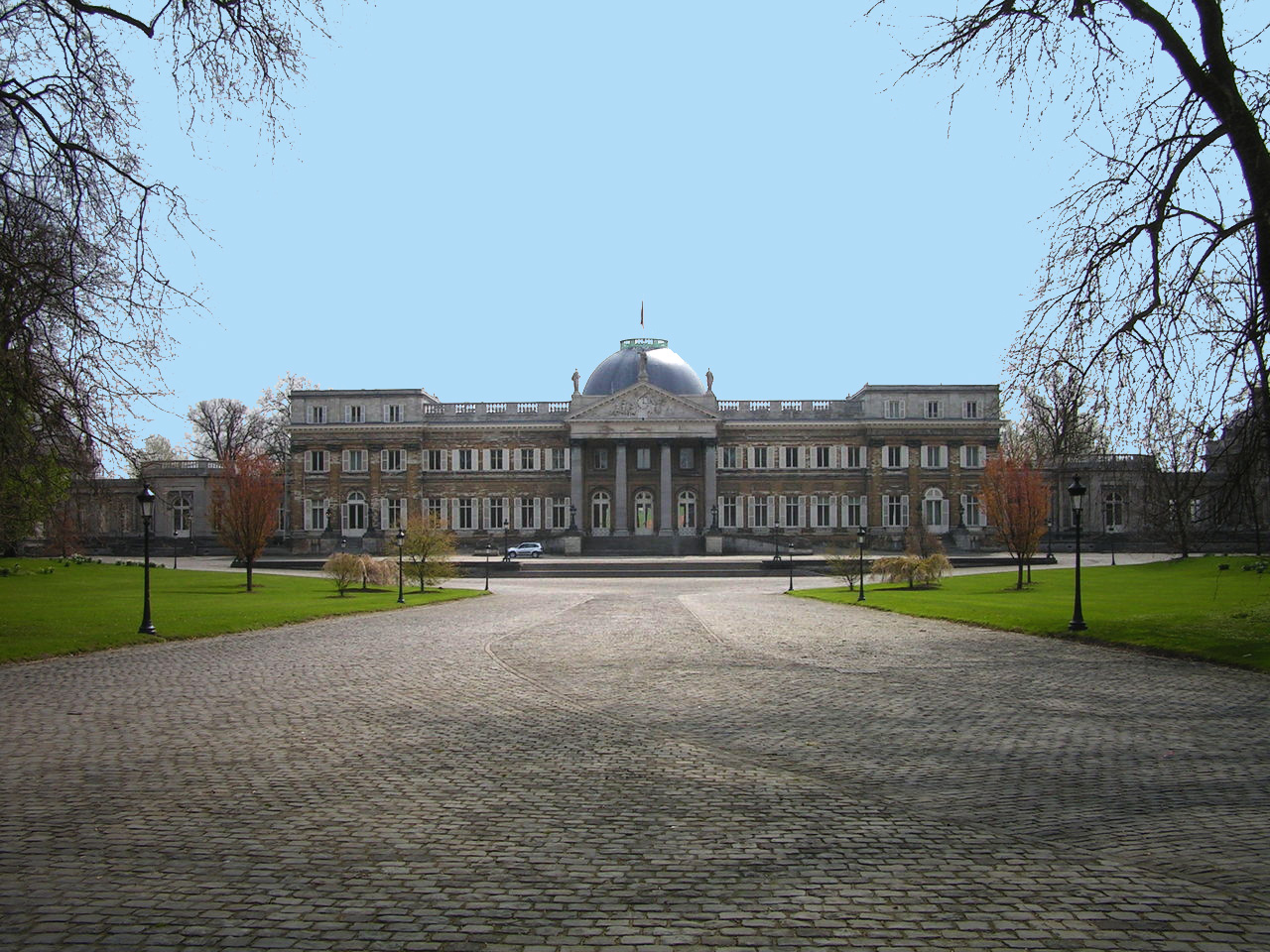
- The course is run in the park grounds near the Royal Palace of Laeken
- Date: Mid-December
- Location: Brussels, Belgium
- Event type: Cross country
- Distance: 10.5 km for men 6 km for women
- Website: Lotto Cross Cup Brussels

The Lotto Cross Cup Brussels, also known as the IRIS Lotto Cross Cup, is an annual cross country running competition that takes place in mid-December in Brussels, Belgium. It is part of the Lotto Cross Cup series of races and is classed as an IAAF permit meeting, making athletes' performances eligible for qualification into the IAAF World Cross Country Championships.

Thousands of runners compete in the meeting each year, based in Laeken Park, and amateur 5K and 10K races take place in addition to the professional races. The meeting was postponed in 2008 because the European Cross Country Championships (previously scheduled to take place in Ostend) had to be moved to the Brussels course following difficulties due to the weather. The quality of the competition is high, with past winners including multiple world champions Paul Tergat and Kenenisa Bekele.

== Past senior race winners ==
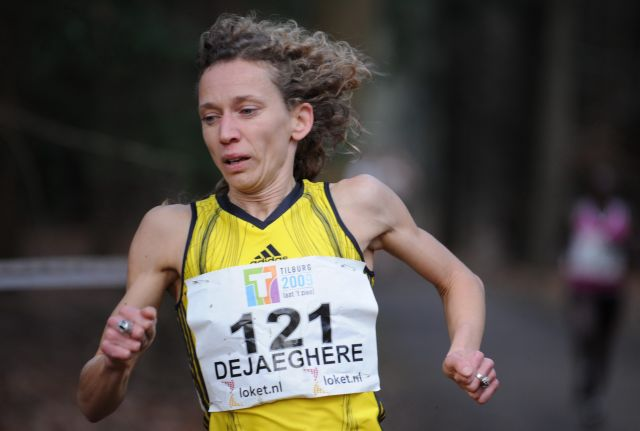
Veerle Dejaeghere took the 2007 women's title.

Year	Men's winner	Time (m:s)	Women's winner	Time (m:s)
2001	Serhiy Lebid (UKR)	?	Edith Masai (KEN)	
2002	Kenenisa Bekele (ETH)	35:14	Galina Bogomolova (RUS)	22:44
2003	Paul Tergat (KEN)	33:50	Gelete Burka (ETH)	21:05
2004	Abebe Dinkesa (ETH)	33:22	Gelete Burka (ETH)	20:46
2005	Abebe Dinkesa (ETH)	35:01	Teyba Erkesso (ETH)	22:18
2006	Bernard Chepkok (KEN)	33:24	Teyba Erkesso (ETH)	21:37
2007	Paul Koech (KEN)	30:31	Veerle Dejaeghere (BEL)	19:41
2008	Not held	—	Not held	—
2009	Andrea Lalli (ITA)	31:37	Adriënne Herzog (NED)	20:23
2010	Serhiy Lebid (UKR)	31:27	Caroline Chepkwony (KEN)	20:35
2011	Isiah Koech (KEN)	32:32	Caroline Chepkwony (KEN)	21:17
2012	Gilbert Kirui (KEN)	33:02	Ruti Aga (ETH)	20:48
2013	Alex Kibet (KEN)	30:40	Sifan Hassan (NED)	19:38
2014	Alex Kibet (KEN)	32:09	Sheila Chepngetich (KEN)	19:57
2015	Dame Tasama (ETH)	32:19	Fionnuala McCormack (IRE)	20:07
2016	Isaac Kimeli (BEL)	26:26	Fionnuala McCormack (IRE)	19:28
2018	Isaac Kimeli (BEL)	29:04	Imana Truyers (BEL)	19:57
