= Pieter Van Havermaet =

Belgian painter (1834–1897)

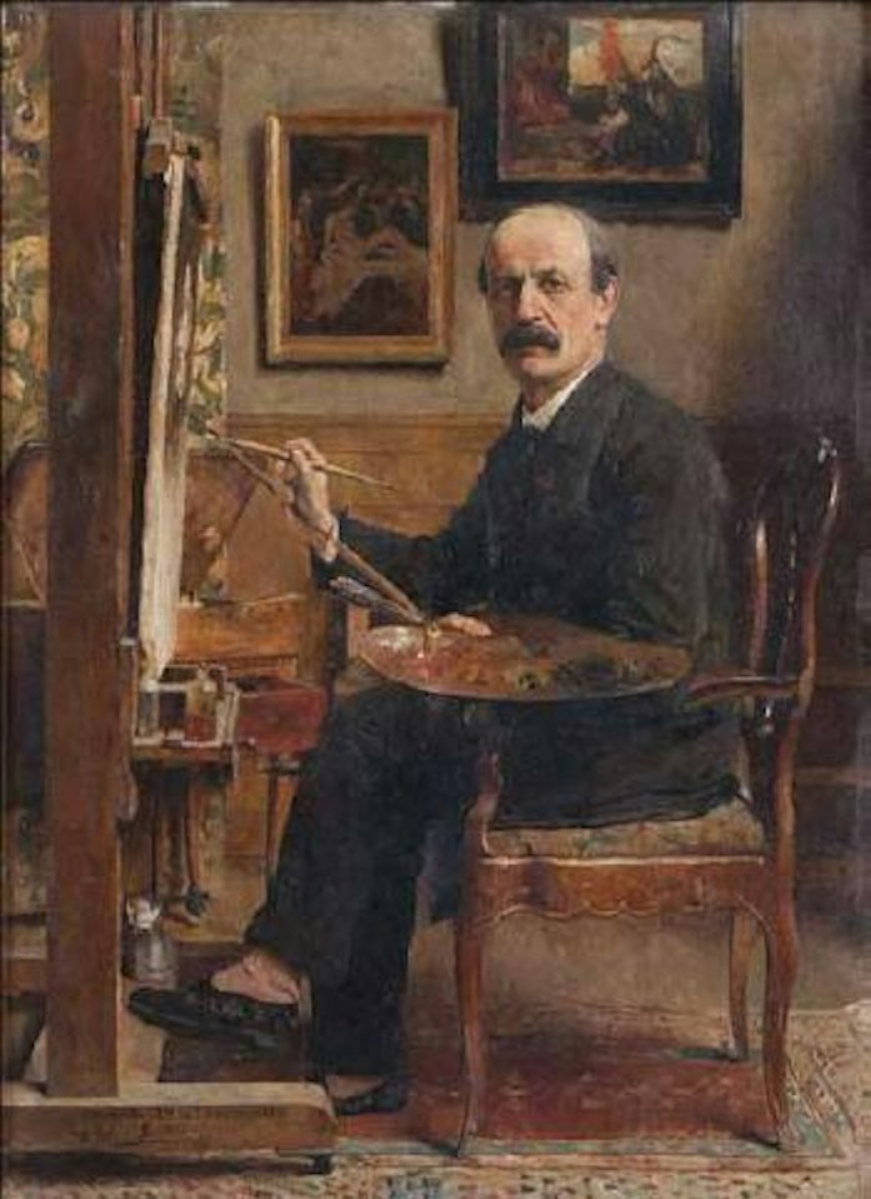
Portrait of Pieter Van Havermaet by Charles Mertens

Pieter Van Havermaet or Petrus Van Havermaet, known in his time as P. Van Havermaet (Sint-Niklaas, 16 January 1834 - Antwerp, 8 May 1897) was a Belgian draughtsman, painter and art educator. He is mainly known for his portraits and genre portraits. After first training in his native Sint-Niklaas he spent the rest of his career in Antwerp with intermittent periods of work in London where he made portraits of prominent individuals such as Benjamin Disraeli and Sir George Elliot.

== Life ==
Van Havermaet was born in Sint-Niklaas. He was the younger brother of the sculptor Frans Van Havermaet. He studied at the Academy of Sint-Niklaas where he attended the painting class of August De Wilde. Later he attended at the Royal Academy of Fine Arts in Antwerp the summer course of 1860 and the winter courses of 1861-1862 and 1864–1865. He attended the painting from nature course there. His teachers were Jozef Van Lerius and Jan Antoon Verschaeren. His fellow students at the academy included Piet Van Der Ouderaa, Karel Ooms and Willem Linnig the Younger. Van Havermaet made his debut at the Antwerp Salon of 1867 where he showed his portrait paintings.

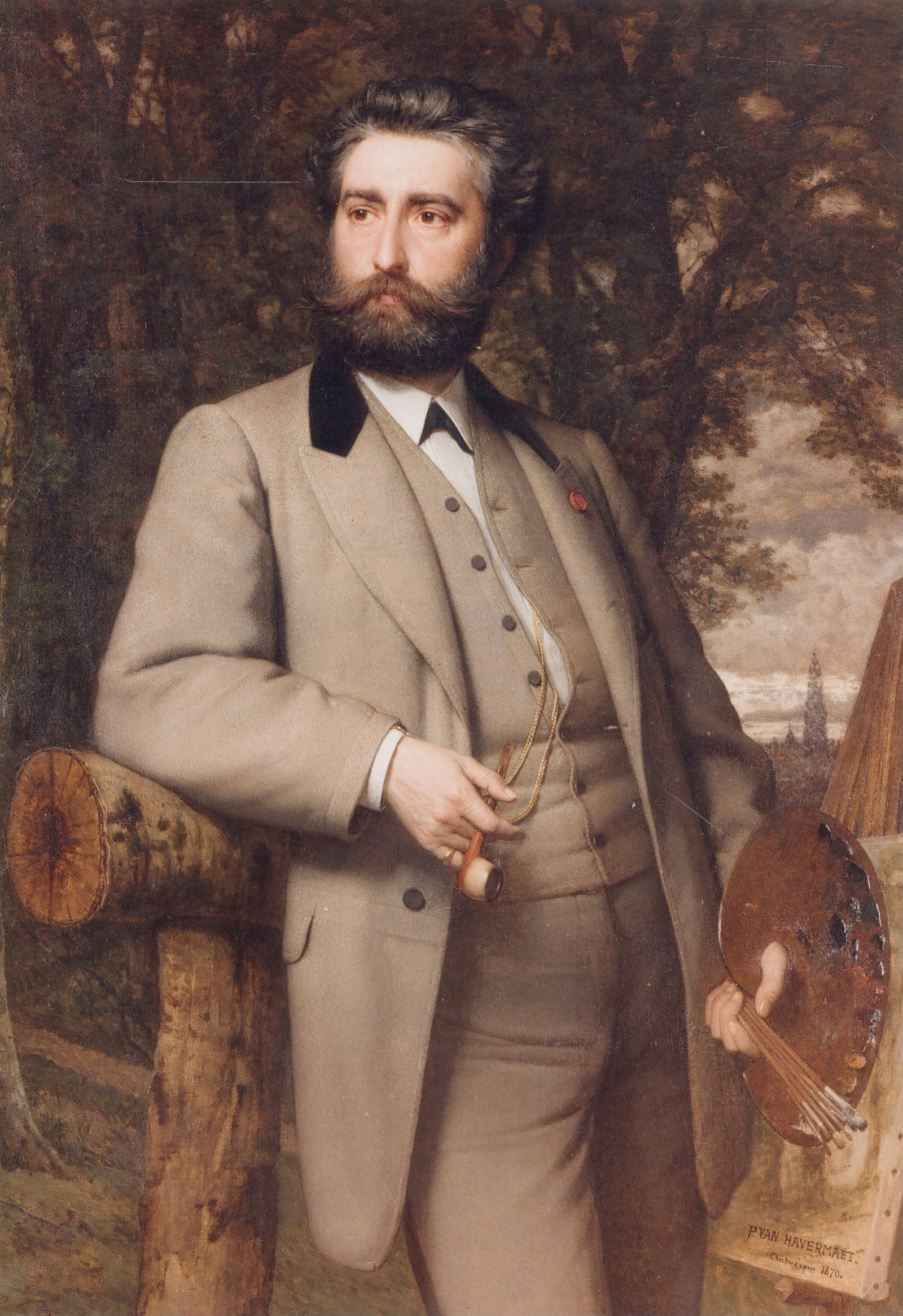
Portrait of François Lamorinière

He married Maria Carolina Joanna Michaelsen on 28 May 1864. The couple had four children: Françiscus Emilius, Waltherus Joannes, Carolus Petrus Maria and Léonia Albina Elisabeth. Carolus known as Charles Van Havermaet became a painter and worked the latter part of his life in London.

In 1886 he was appointed by royal decree as a teacher of the Antwerp Royal Academy of Fine Arts. From 27 September 1886 until his death, Van Havermaet taught the subject 'Drawing of the figure after life and after antiques'. For his role at the Academy of Antwerp, the artist received an annual salary of 3,000 francs.

From the 1895 school year until his death, Van Havermaet was allowed to teach a second course at the same institution, namely the subject of 'shadowed drawing after plaster, bust, etc.'. His annual salary was increased by 1,000 francs at that time. At the time the Antwerp enjoyed an international reputation and attracted students locally and from abroad. Van Havermaet's students included local artists such as Eugeen Van Mieghem, as well as the Englishman Frederick William Elwell and the Dutchmen Hendrik Jan Wolter, Gerard Bos, Antoon van Welie and Jos (Joseph) Schippers.

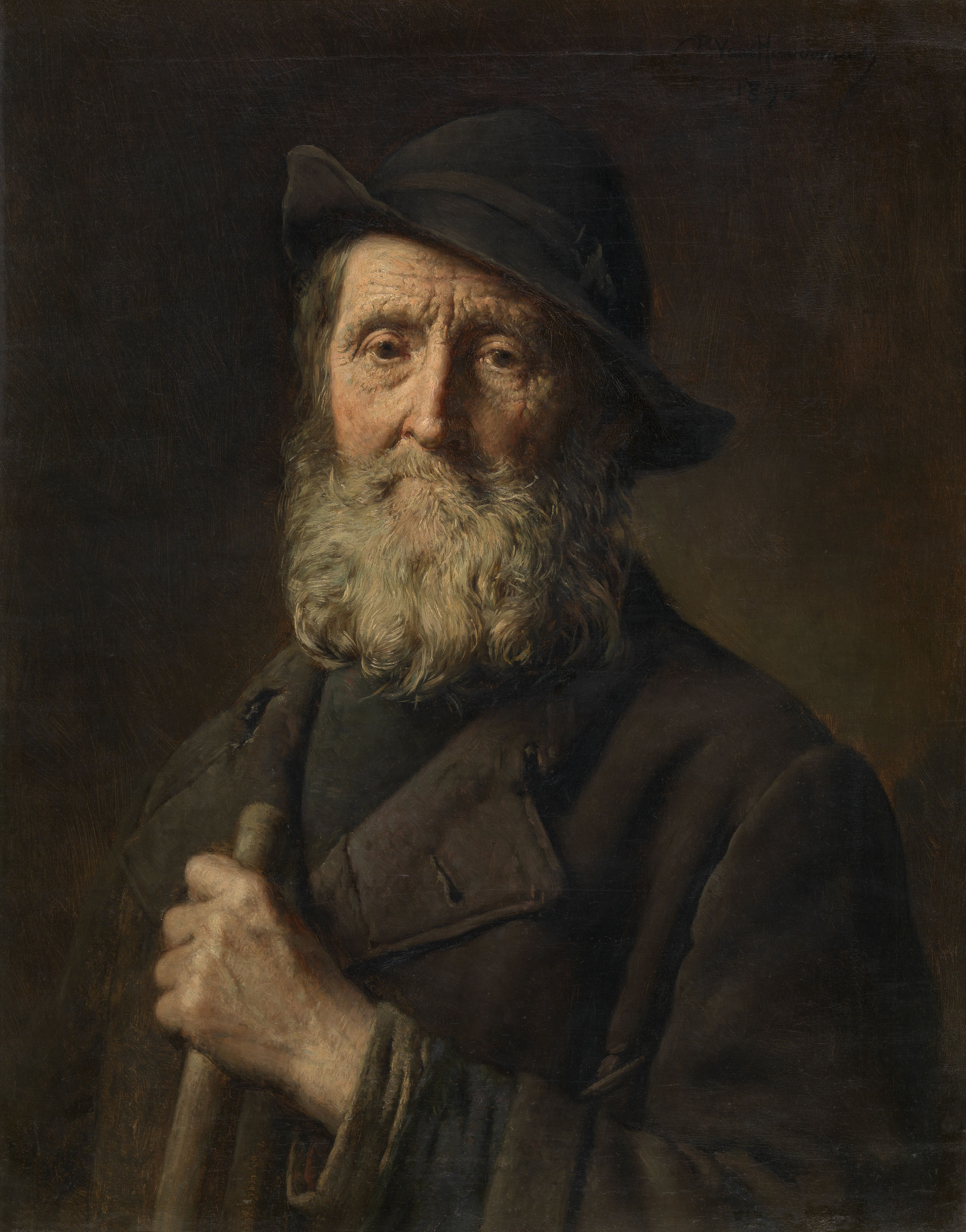
Antwerp street sweeper

Van Havermaet not only taught at the Royal Academy of Antwerp. He also taught a course for female students at his home studio, which was very well attended. The Antwerp painter Charles Mertens painted a large painting of the students attending this course entitled The pupils of P. Van Havermaet. His female students included Marie Antoinette Marcotte and Alice Eckermans.

Besides teaching, Van Havermaet painted many portraits for the well-to-do bourgeoisie. These were so popular that for a long time he was the portrait painter of choice in the Antwerp metropolis. He also painted portraits of fellow artists such as that of the Antwerp landscape painter François Lamorinière, who at one point lived in the same street as the artist. The artist also worked abroad for a period. A notice in the Journal des Beaux-Arts of 1879 states that Pieter Van Havermaet recently moved to London to paint some works there. The exact dates of his residence in London are not clear, but it is assumed that he had arrived in London and painted the portrait of Samuel Laing before 15 January 1879. In the year 1881, he received the Belgian title of Knight in the Order of Leopold. In 1892, he became an Officer in the Order of Leopold.

Van Havermaet was also an amateur hairdresser and barber. His studio became a hair salon on every Saturday and Sunday. His "clients" were all artists and were served free of charge.

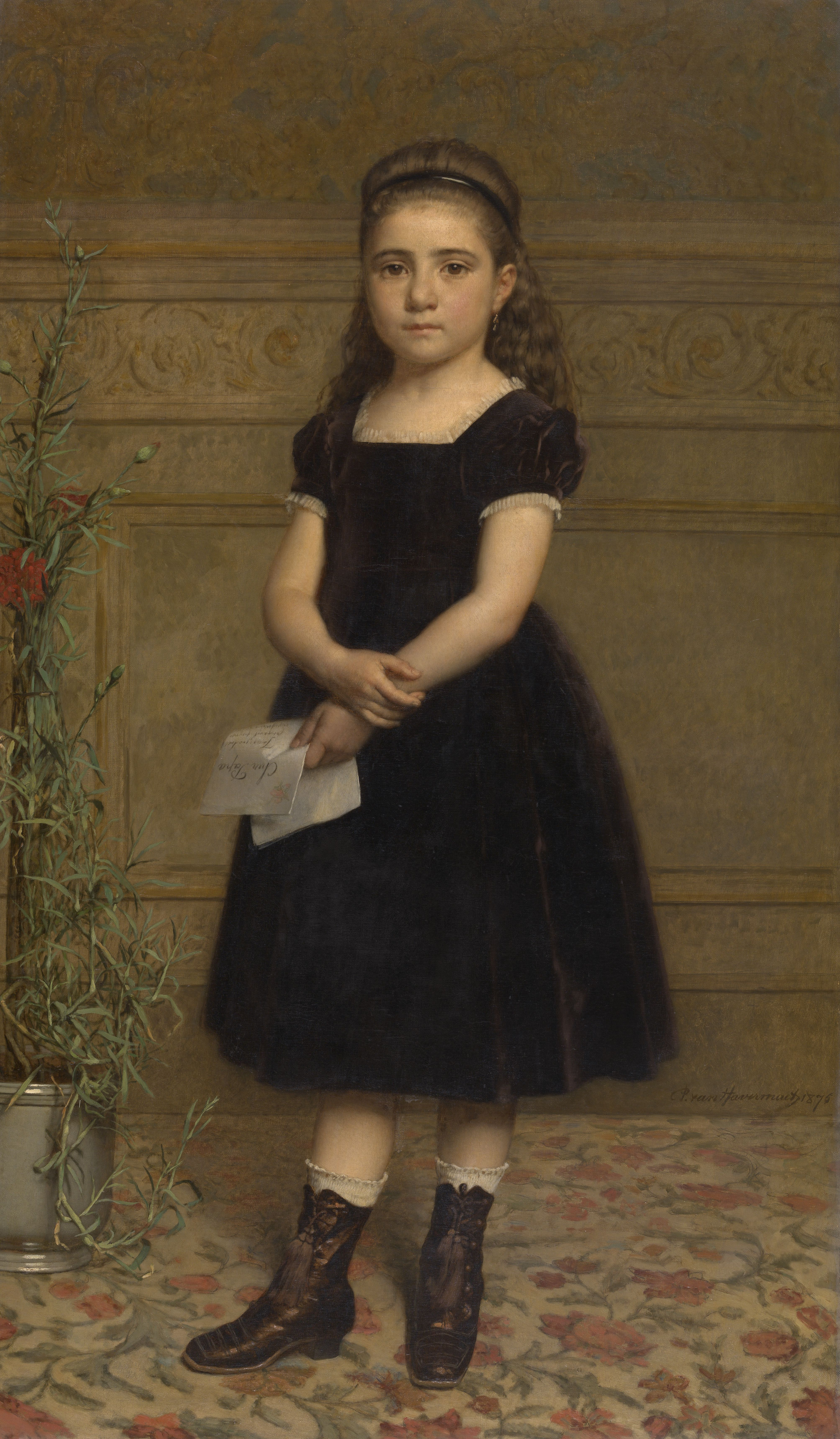
Portrait of Amélie Baschwitz

Van Havermaet died on 8 May 1897 in Antwerp. He was succeeded as a teacher at the Antwerp Academy by Piet Verhaert, who was already a teacher at the academy at that time and who would take over his subjects.

== Work ==
Van Havermaet is mainly known for his portraits and genre portraits. He also painted landscapes but no known works by him in this genre are currently known. His oeuvre is realistic.

He initially painted portraits in the dark style typical of Belgian portrait painters of the time. In these works, the background is very dark and monochromatic and the emphasis is on the face, hands and attributes of the sitter. In later works he lightened his palette, added more contrasts and often used earth pigments. In those works he further paid more attention to the background and the surrounding elements.

Van Havermaet often added some genre elements to his portraits by portraying the sitters engaged in some everyday activity. An example is the child portrait of Amélie Baschwtiz, who is depicted holding a New Year's letter to her father.
