= Charles Van Havermaet =

Belgian painter

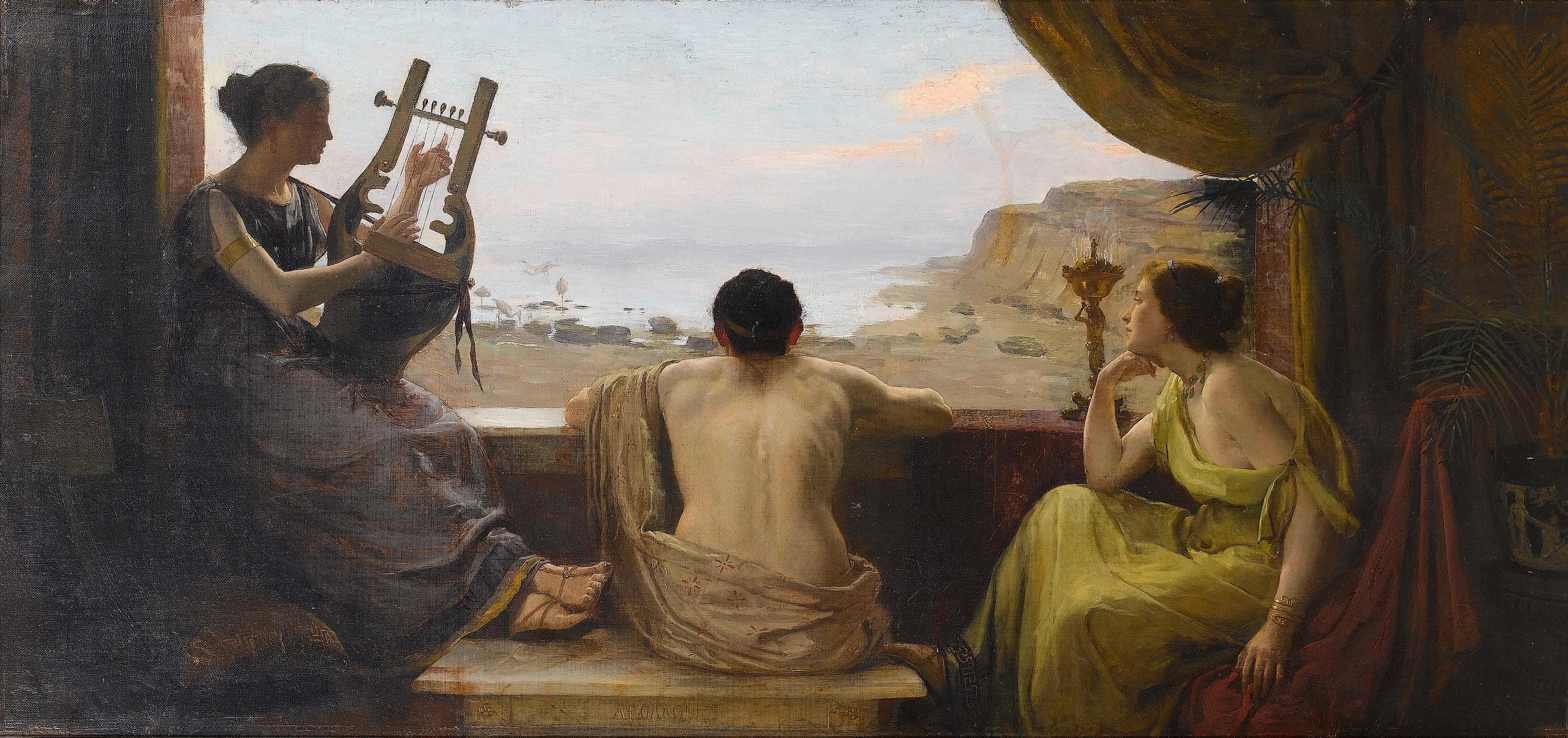
Pensive moment

Charles Van Havermaet or Karel Van Havermaet (Antwerp, 28 May 1868 – after 1911) was a Belgian draughtsman, painter and illustrator.He is mainly known for his genre scenes, portraits, still lifes and allegorical paintings. After training in his native Antwerp he spent the rest of his career in London.

== Life ==
Van Havermaet was born in Antwerp as the third of four children of the painter and art professor Pieter Van Havermaet and Maria Carolina Joanna Michaelsen. His father, originally from Sint-Niklaas was the younger brother of the sculptor Frans Van Havermaet. He had studied at the Academy of Sint-Niklaas and later at the Royal Academy of Fine Arts in Antwerp. In 1886, his father was appointed a teacher at the Antwerp Royal Academy of Fine Arts; he was one of the teachers with whom Vincent van Gogh later came into conflict.

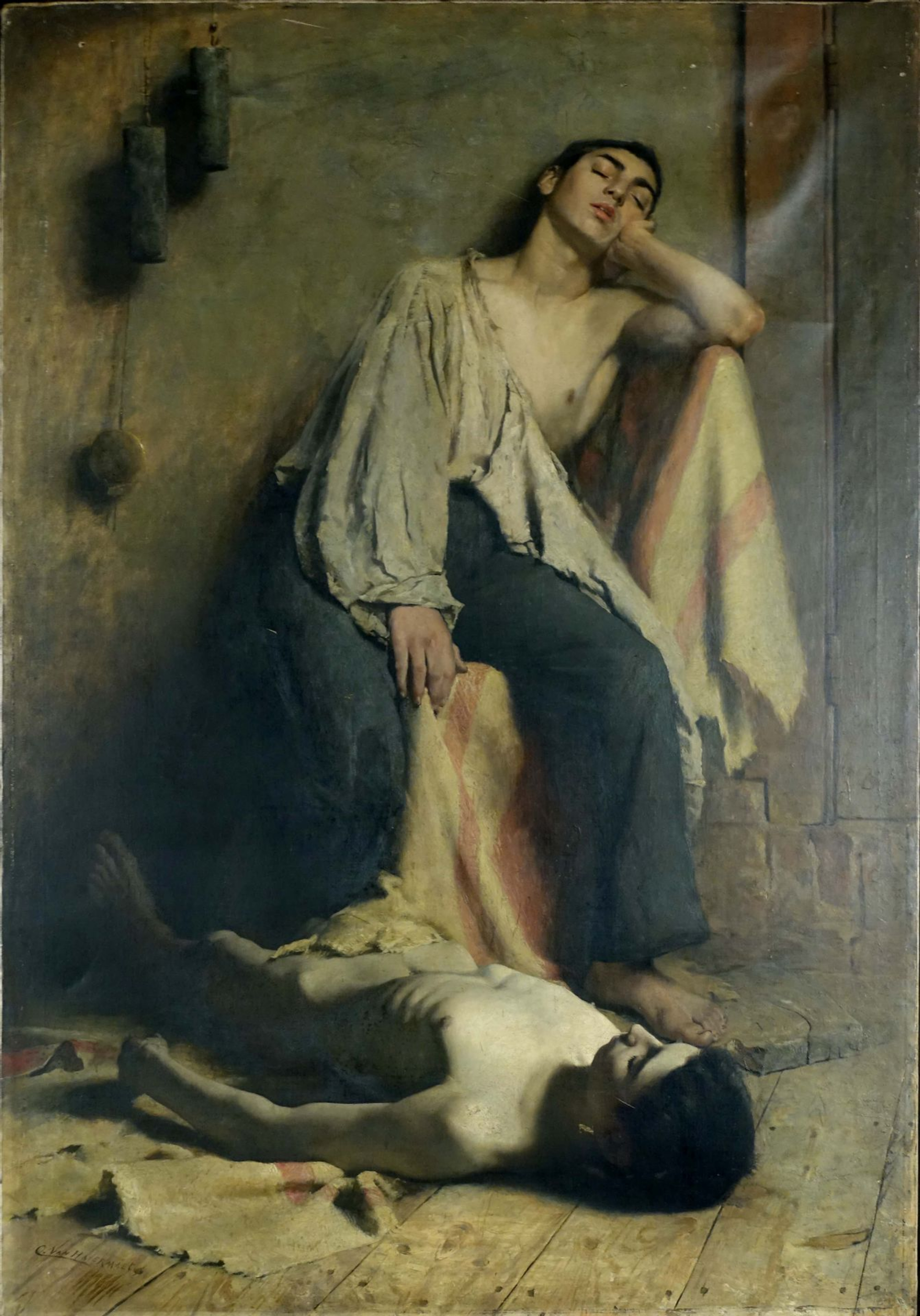
The dream and his brother death

Charles studied at the Royal Academy of Fine Arts in Antwerp. He was a member of the artist group De Scalden founded in 1889 in Antwerp with the medallist Jules Baetes taking on the role of the chairman. The group's two objectives were to organise exhibitions of decorative art and to design public parades. The group existed until the outbreak of World War I in 1914. While in Antwerp Academy British cartoonist, watercolourist, illustrator, and poster designer John Hassall studied with him. He exhibited at the 35th exhibition at the Casino in Ghent in 1892 on the occasion of the 100th anniversary of the Koninklijke Maatschappij ter Aanmoediging van de de Schone Kunsten (Royal Society for the Encouragement of Fine Arts) in Ghent, at the Exposition d'Anvers in 1898 and at the Salon Triennal des Beaux-Arts in Brussels in 1903.

The artist moved to London around 1900. He was registered in the 1901 London census with the following details: he was single, his occupation was that of painter and he resided as a boarder at Linden Gardens, Kensington, London. Together with his former pupil John Hassall he established some time between 1900 and 1905 the New Art School (later renamed Hassall School of Art) at 3 Stratford Road, Kensington, London. His pupils included the British caricaturist and illustrator Henry Mayo Bateman (1904–1907) and the New Zealand-born British painter Owen Merton (1909–10).

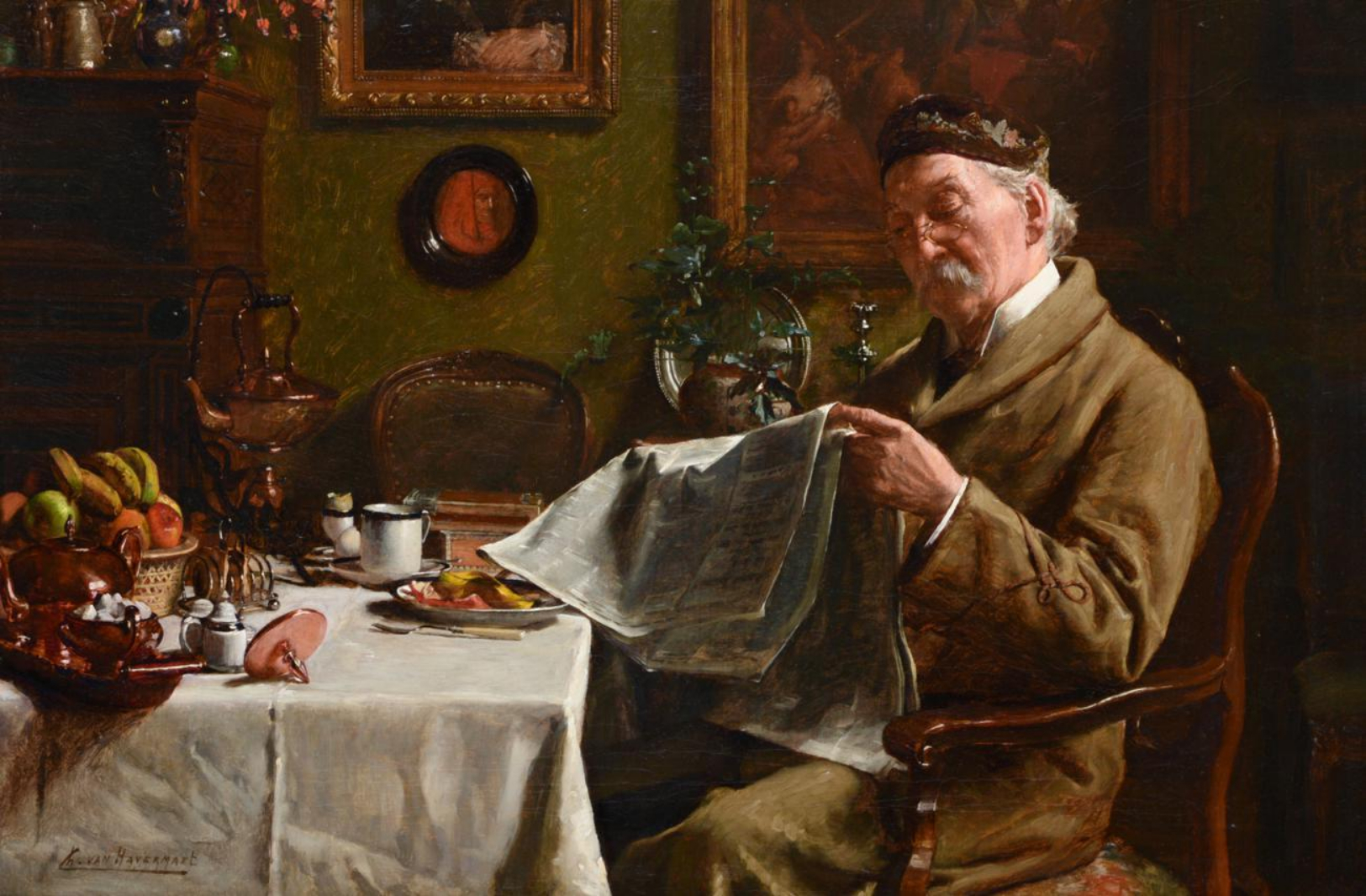
Daily News

Ada Susan Tatham (Molyneux), the founder of an Art Gallery in Pietermaritzburg, Colony of Natal (now in South Africa) collected in 1904 funds from women and children of Natal to commission a copy of Franz Xaver Winterhalter's state coronation portrait of Queen Victoria in St James's Palace, London. Charles van Havermaet was selected to make the copy. King Edward VII granted approval for him to spend six weeks copying the portrait on site. The painting originally hung in the Pietermaritzburg City Council Chamber. In 1995 the painting was moved to the main stairwell of the Tatham Art Gallery located in the Old Supreme Court Building in Pietermaritzburg.

Van Havermaet exhibited paintings at the exhibitions of the Royal Academy of Arts each year from 1901 to 1911 except in 1902. He exhibited in 1901 The children of John Hassall, Esq., in 1903 The restorer, in 1904 The connoisseur, in 1905 a St John and The hours of leisure, in 1906 Sleep and his brother death, in 1907 The nest, in 1908 The morning paper, in 1909 The end of the story, in 1910 The empty chair and in 1911 Something interesting. His registered address in 1901 was 42 Linden Gardens, London and from 1904 it was 22 West Kensington Gardens, London, the location of the art school he had co-founded.

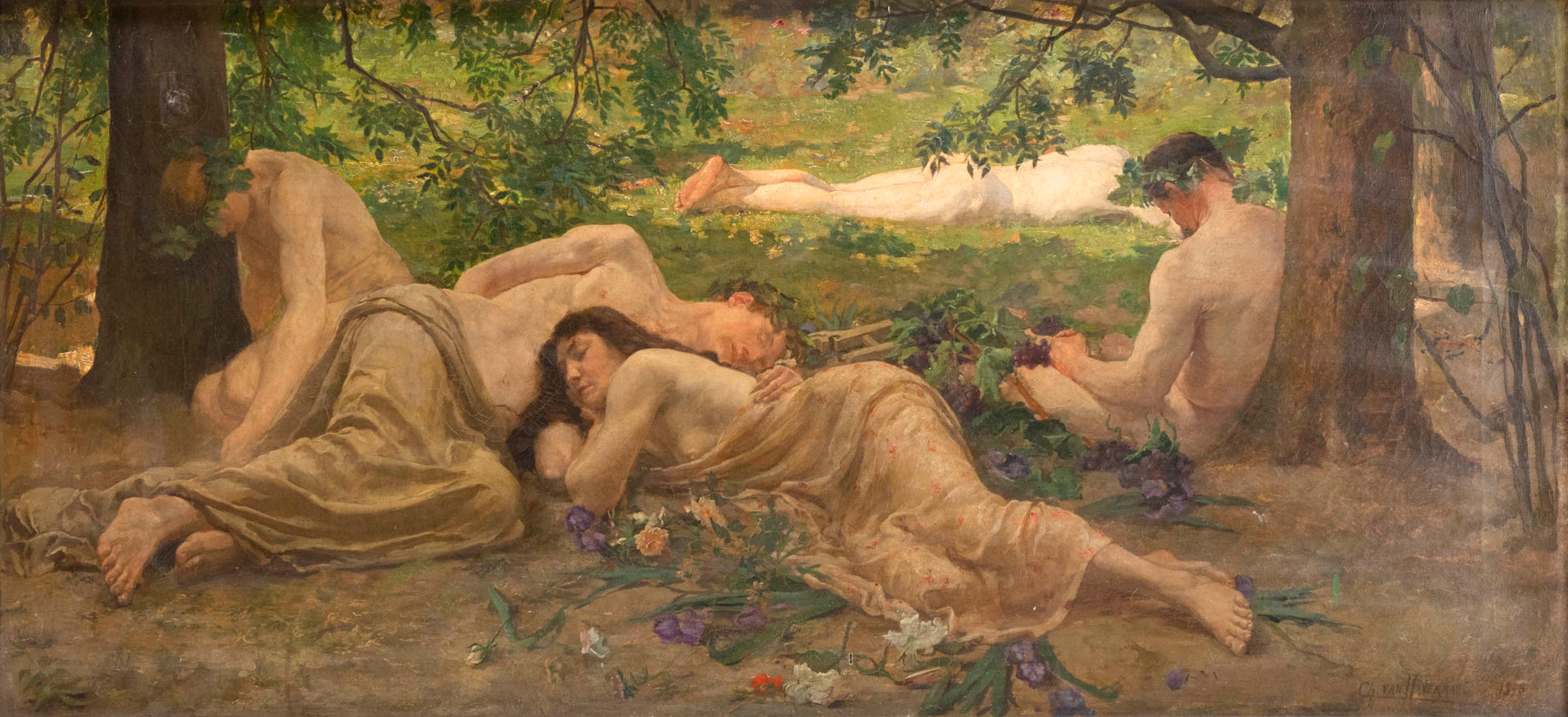
Drunkenness

There are no reports of the activities of the artist after 1911.

== Work ==
Van Havermaet is mainly known for his genre scenes, portraits, still lifes and allegorical paintings. His genre scenes are typically scenes of persons in a closed environment showing one ore more persons engaged in some everyday activity. Examples are a Gentleman with a cigar, The oyster eater and the Boy reading in an interior. These works are executed in a realist style. This is also the case of his portraits, which are in the style of his father Pieter, a well-known portrait artist.
