= Marie Antoinette Marcotte =

French painter

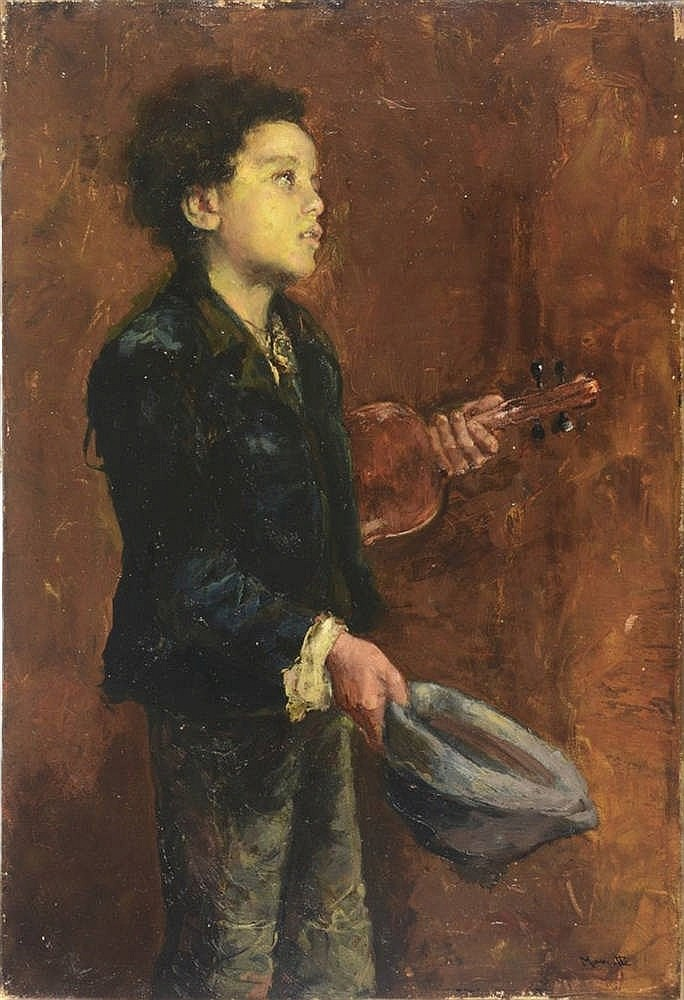
Blind violin player

Marie Antoinette Marcotte (31 May 1867 – 1929) was a French painter who lived and worked mainly in Belgium. She is known for her paintings of gardens and flowers, portraits and genre scenes that show her interest in the living conditions of disadvantaged social classes.

== Life ==
Marie Antoinette Marcotte was born in Troyes. Her mother was member of an aristocratic Toudouze family which included various artists during the 19th century. Her father was at the time of her birth Vice-Consul of France at Ostend and later in Antwerp in 1872. Marie Antoinette moved there too and later received instructions from the prominent painter Emile Claus. After her father died in 1884, her mother married Jules Alexandre Sohr, with whom she had three more children.

At the age of 19 she was allowed to move to Paris to study with Jules Joseph Lefebvre. She later studied at the Académie Royale des Beaux-Arts in Brussels under Jean-François Portaels and Joseph Stallaert. She lived and worked in Antwerp where she also studied in the studio of the portrait painter Pieter Van Havermaet.

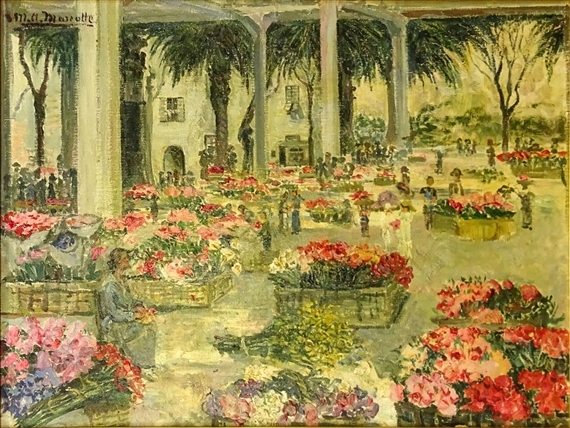
The flower market

She began exhibiting at the Salon of the Société des Artistes Français in 1901. In Paris she began exhibiting at the Salon of the Société des Artistes Français in 1901, and under J. Lefèbvre in Paris.

== Work ==
Her work With the Poor at Home was included in the book Women Painters of the World.
