= H. M. Bateman =

British artist and cartoonist (1887–1970)

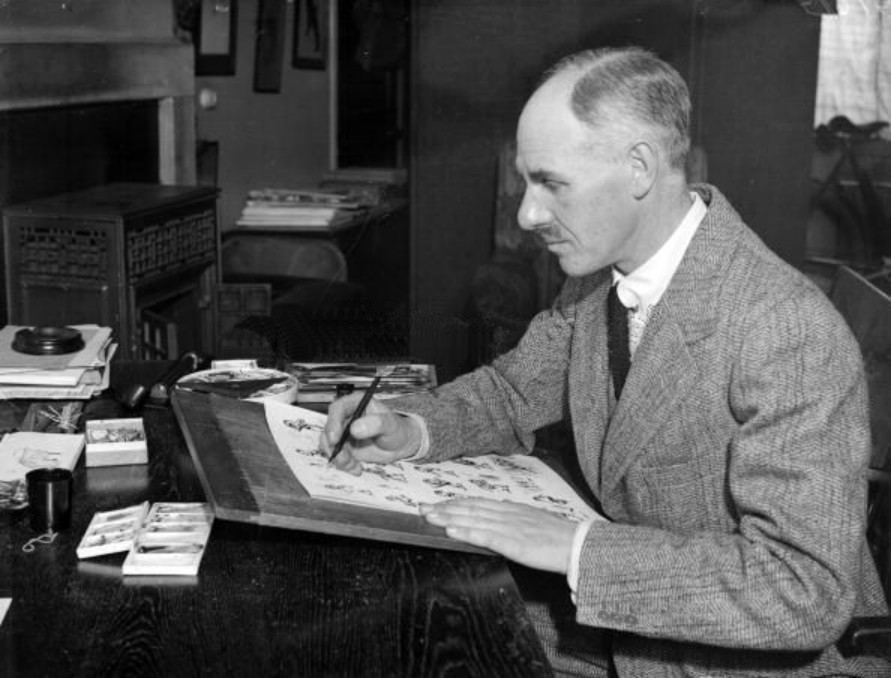
- H. M. Bateman working at his home in Reigate, Surrey, 2 December 1931
- Born: Henry Mayo Bateman; 15 February 1887; Moss Vale, New South Wales, Australia
- Died: 11 February 1970 (aged 82); Mgarr, Malta
- Style: Cartoonist

Henry Mayo Bateman (15 February 1887 – 11 February 1970, Mgarr, Malta) was a British humorous artist and cartoonist.

H. M. Bateman was noted for his "The Man Who..." series of cartoons, featuring comically exaggerated reactions to minor and usually upper-class social gaffes, such as "The Man Who Lit His Cigar Before the Royal Toast", "The Man Who Threw a Snowball at St. Moritz" and "The Boy Who Breathed on the Glass at the British Museum" which appeared in the satirical magazine Punch.

== Early life ==
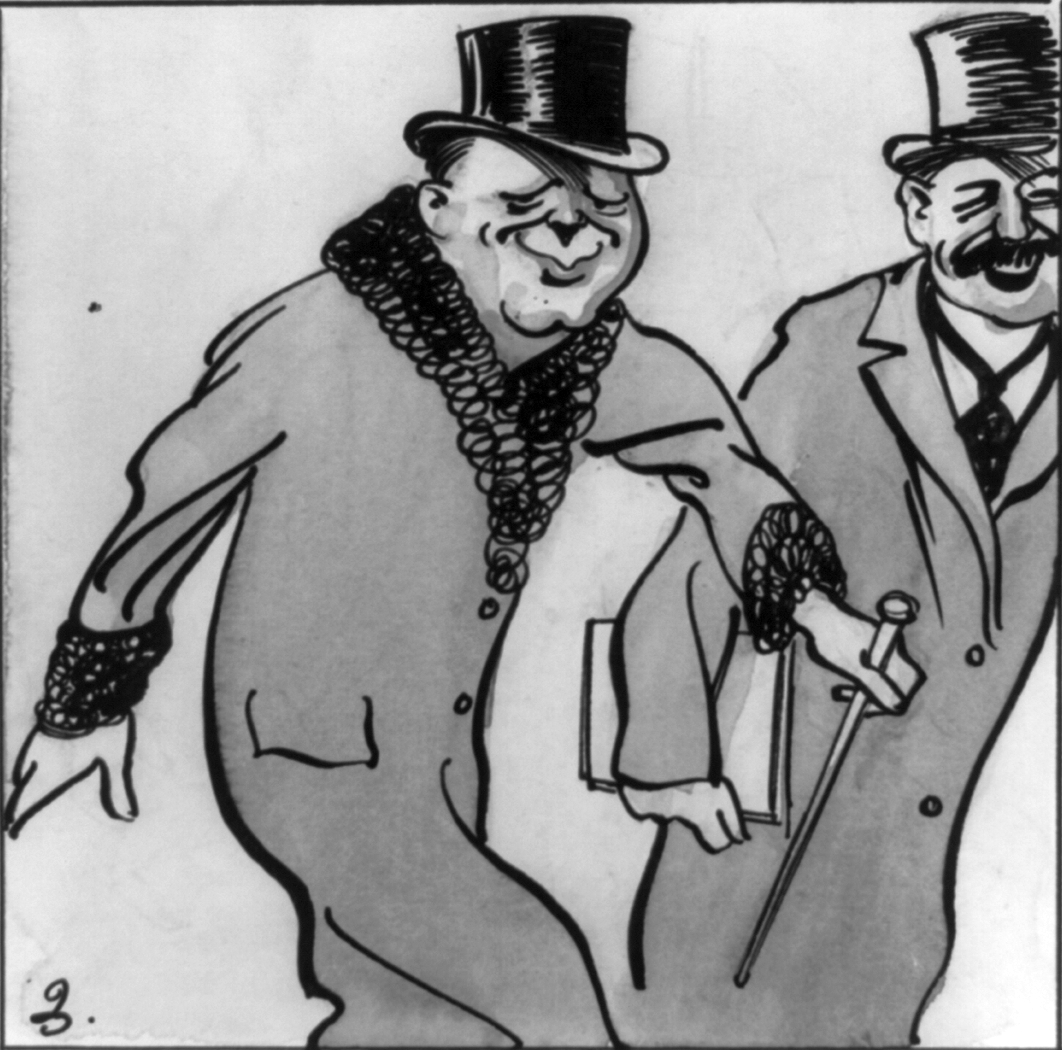
"Winston Churchill smiles at the camera". Cartoon by H. M. Bateman (ca. 1912).

Henry Bateman was born in the small village of Sutton Forest in New South Wales, Australia. His parents were Henry Charles Bateman and Rose Mayo. His father had left England for Australia in 1878, at the age of 21, to seek his fortune. He returned to England briefly in 1885 before going back with an English wife. Soon after Henry was born, the family returned to London. Henry had one sister, Phyllis, three years younger.

From an early age, Bateman was enthusiastic about drawing. At the age of 14, he had already decided had an illustration published. In 1901, the cartoonist Phil May, in response to a letter from Rose, showed interest in his drawings, and in that year, Bateman was inspired by an exhibition of black-and-white art at the Victoria and Albert Museum.

Bateman initially studied at Forest Hill House. His father had initially decided that he should follow him into business, but eventually, after many arguments, financed his study at the Westminster School of Art, which he commenced at the age of 16. Bateman did well but was bored by the lifeless "life" classes and, after qualifying at Westminster, transferred his study to the New Cross Art School. (Note: Later known as the Goldsmith Institute)

He also did some practical work at the studio of Charles Van Havermaet.

== Career ==
Bateman's first published drawing was in Scraps in 1903 and his first contract was in 1904, for ten drawings and two illustrations in a fourpenny monthly magazine called The Royal. He then progressed to a contract with The Tatler and many other magazines besides, including the Illustrated Sporting News and Dramatic News, Pearson's Weekly, Tatler, The Sketch, and Punch, which began publishing his work in 1915.

Although he attempted to join the military and fight in the First World War, he was rejected on medical grounds.

Bateman's first solo exhibition in 1911 was at the Brook Street Gallery, Mayfair. Bateman's work was also part of the painting event in the art competition at the 1928 Summer Olympics.

Bateman was selected by Percy Bradshaw for inclusion in his 1918 The Art of the Illustrator which presented a portfolio for each of twenty illustrators. (Note: The portfolio contained a biography of Bateman, an illustration of him at work in his studio and an explanation of his method of working accompanied by a plate showing a typical example of his work and its preparation stages. Bateman's coloured illustration shows a caricature man in top hat and tails in front of a chorous line of dancing women.) A Book of Drawings was a collection of his cartoons with an introduction by G.K. Chesterton, published in 1921. A bomb destroyed the plates for a luxury edition of the best of The Man Who... cartoons at the beginning of the Second World War.

Bateman greatly influenced the style of American cartoonist Harvey Kurtzman.

== Personal life ==
Bateman married Brenda Collison Wier and they had two children, Diana and Monica, both of whom became artists. Diana was part of a group who later formed the Cartoon Art Trust in 1988.

He separated from his family in 1947 and retired to Devon. In later life, Bateman carried on an increasingly acrimonious battle with the Inland Revenue. His final years were spent on the island of Gozo, Malta, where he died of heart failure in February 1970.

== Commemoration ==
A centenary celebration of his work was exhibited at the Royal Festival Hall on London's South Bank in 1987. An English Heritage blue plaque, unveiled in 1997, commemorates Bateman at 40 Nightingale Lane in Clapham, south London.

== Publications ==
- Bateman, H. M., intr. A. E. Johnson. Burlesques. London: Duckworth, 1916. OCLC 3694458
- Bateman, H. M. A Book of Drawings. London: Methuen, 1921. OCLC 19873491
- Bateman, H. M. Colonels. London: Methuen, 1925. OCLC 29766969
