= 2015 European Athletics U23 Championships – Men's 5000 metres =

The men's 5000 metres event at the 2015 European Athletics U23 Championships was held in Tallinn, Estonia, at Kadriorg Stadium on 11 July.

== Medalists ==
| Gold | Ali Kaya; Turkey |
| Silver | Isaac Kimeli; Belgium |
| Bronze | Carlos Mayo; Spain |

== Results ==
=== Final ===
11 July

| Rank | Name | Nationality | Time | Notes |
|---|---|---|---|---|
| 1st place, gold medalist(s) | Ali Kaya | Turkey | 13:20.16 | |
| 2nd place, silver medalist(s) | Isaac Kimeli | Belgium | 13:54.33 | |
| 3rd place, bronze medalist(s) | Carlos Mayo | Spain | 13:55.19 | |
| 4 | Samuele Dini | Italy | 13:56.65 | |
| 5 | Mykola Nyzhnyk | Ukraine | 13:57.47 | PB |
| 6 | Jonathan Davies | United Kingdom | 13:58.44 | |
| 7 | Alexandre Saddedine | France | 14:01.33 | |
| 8 | Yassine Rachik | Italy | 14:05.00 | |
| 9 | Khalil Rmidi | Spain | 14:05.28 | PB |
| 10 | Steven Casteele | Belgium | 14:07.58 | |
| 11 | Daniele D'Onofrio | Italy | 14:11.27 | |
| 12 | Brandon Hargreaves | Ireland | 14:14.76 | |
| 13 | Yevgeniy Kunts | Russia | 14:15.05 | |
| 14 | Félix Bour | France | 14:25.21 | |
| 15 | Dmitrijs Serjogins | Latvia | 14:46.99 | |
| 16 | István Szögi | Hungary | 14:59.72 | SB |

== Participation ==
According to an unofficial count, 16 athletes from 11 countries participated in the event.

- Belgium (2)
- France (2)
- Hungary (1)
- Ireland (1)
- Italy (3)
- Latvia (1)
- Russia (1)
- Spain (2)
- Turkey (1)
- Ukraine (1)
- United Kingdom (1)
