= François Delloye =

Belgian athlete (1888–1958)

François Delloye (16 December 1888 – 14 November 1958) was a Belgian athlete. He competed at the 1908 Summer Olympics in London. In the 1500 metres, Delloye placed fifth of seven in his initial semifinal heat and did not advance to the final. He also competed at the 1912 Summer Olympics in Stockholm.

== Sources ==
- Cook, Theodore Andrea (1908). The Fourth Olympiad, Being the Official Report. London: British Olympic Association.
- De Wael, Herman (2001). "Athletics 1908". Herman's Full Olympians. Archived from the original on 27 September 2006.
- Wudarski, Pawel (1999). "Wyniki Igrzysk Olimpijskich" (in Polish). Archived from the original on 16 February 2009.
- Evans, Hilary; Gjerde, Arild; Heijmans, Jeroen; Mallon, Bill; et al. "François Delloye". Olympics at Sports-Reference.com. Sports Reference LLC. Archived from the original on 2016-03-19.
- François Delloye at World Athletics
- François Delloye at Olympics.com
- François Delloye at Olympedia
