= August Broos =

Belgian long-distance runner

Personal information
- Nationality: Belgian
- Born: 9 November 1894
- Died: 27 October 1954 (aged 59)

Sport
- Sport: Long-distance running
- Event: Marathon

August Broos (9 November 1894 – 27 October 1954) was a Belgian long-distance runner. He competed at the 1920 and 1924 Summer Olympics.
