= Ida Degrande =

Belgian middle-distance runner

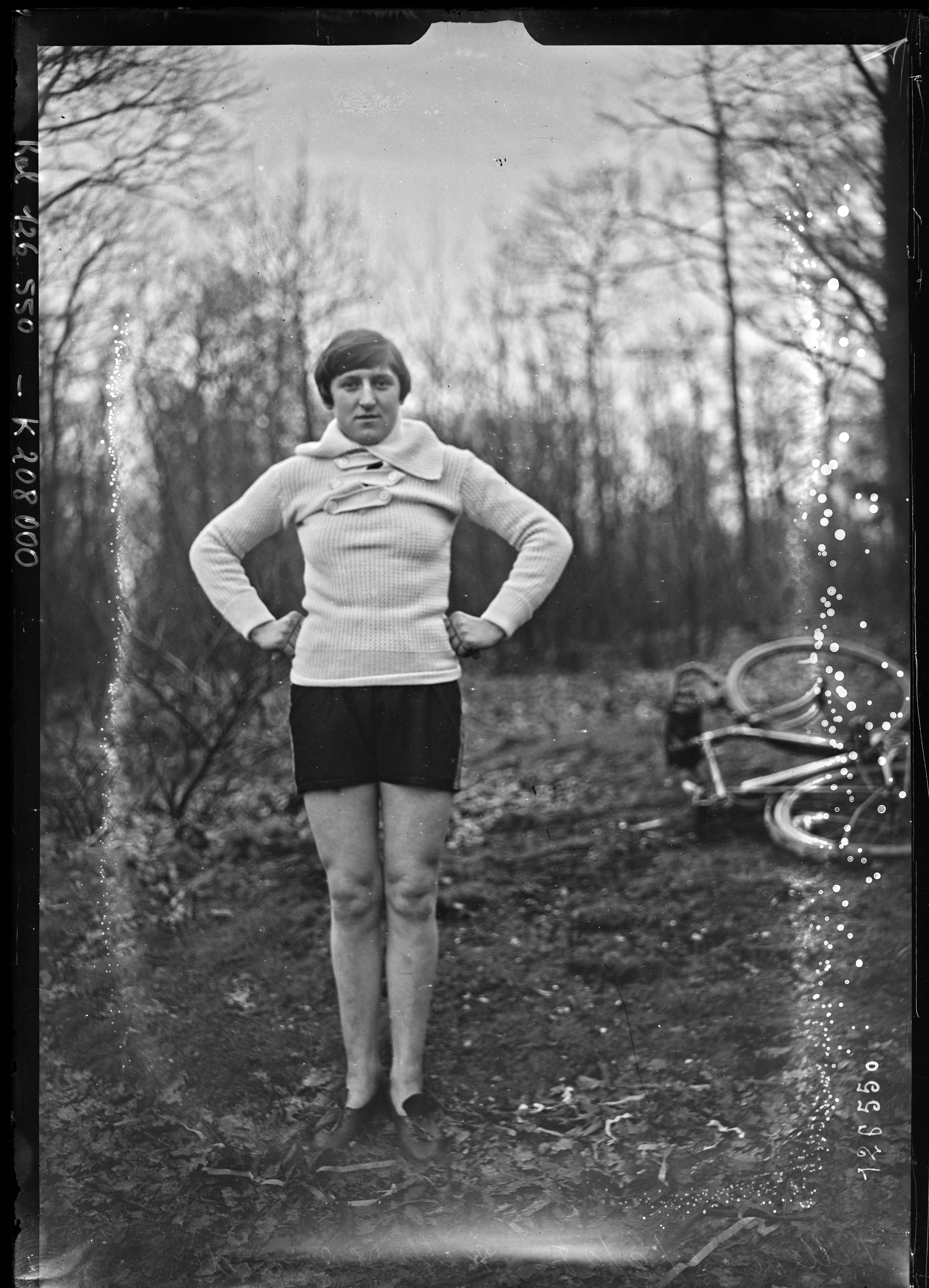
- Ida Degrande in 1928.

Personal information
- Nationality: Belgian
- Born: 5 February 1910
- Died: 16 August 1992 (aged 82)

Sport
- Sport: Middle-distance running
- Event: 800 metres

Ida Degrande (5 February 1910 – 16 August 1992) was a Belgian middle-distance runner. In 1924 the participated in the 1924 Women's Olympiad winning the bronze medal in running 1000 metres. She competed in the women's 800 metres at the 1928 Summer Olympics.
