= Veerle Dejaeghere =

Belgian runner (born 1973)

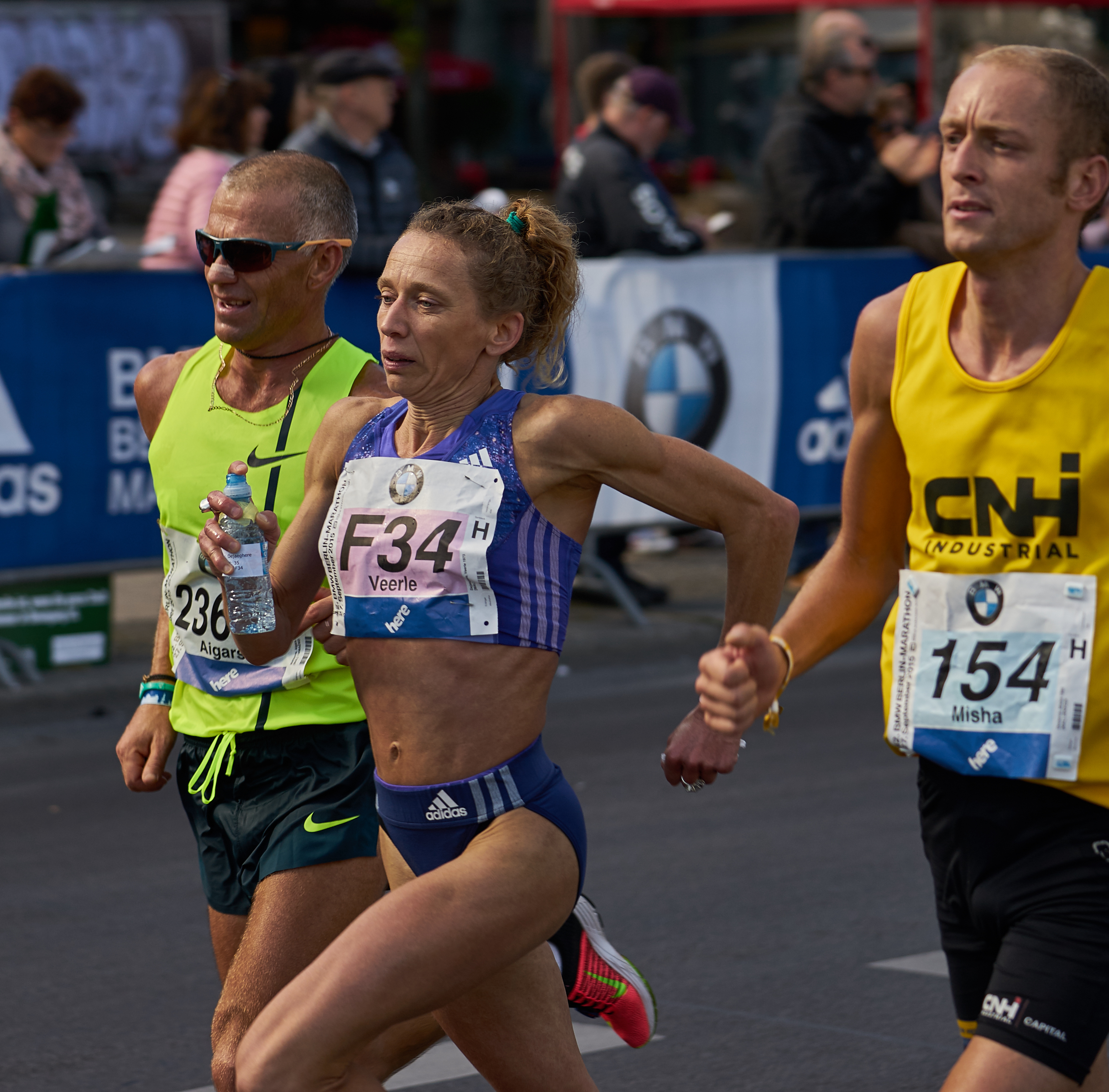
- Dejaeghere at the 2015 Berlin Marathon

Personal information
- Born: 1 August 1973 (age 53) (Belgium) Izegem
- Height: 1.58 m (5 ft 2 in)
- Weight: 46 kg (101 lb)

Sport
- Country: Belgium
- Club: A.C. Hulshout
- Now coaching: Michel Ramboer

Achievements and titles
- Personal best: 9:28.47 min (2007)

Veerle Dejaeghere (born 1 August 1973, in Izegem) is a Belgian runner, who has specialized in the 3000 metres steeplechase. She represented her country at the Summer Olympics in 2000 and 2008.

Dejaeghere formerly specialized in the 1500 metres, reaching the semi-final in this event at the 2000 Summer Olympics.

She has been very successful in the Lotto Cross Cup (Belgium's domestic cross country series), having won the series overall a total of 13 times, including 11 consecutive wins from 2004 to 2014. This included a win at the Lotto Cross Cup Brussels in 2007, in which she finished ahead of Lornah Kiplagat and Emebt Etea. She has also won twice at the Eurocross meeting in Luxembourg.

Dejaeghere missed most of the 2009 and 2010 seasons. She was the runner-up at the Campaccio race in January 2011, but did not compete again until November's Lotto Cross Cup van West-Vlaanderen, where she was again runner-up (this time behind Yuliya Ruban).

== Achievements ==
Year	Competition	Venue	Position	Event	Notes
Representing Belgium
2004	World Indoor Championships	Budapest, Hungary	10th	3000 m	
2005	European Indoor Championships	Madrid, Spain	9th	3000 m	
2006	European Championships	Gothenburg, Sweden	5th	3000 m s'chase	
2007	World Championships	Osaka, Japan	11th	3000 m s'chase	

=== Personal bests ===
- 1500 metres⁣ – 4:05.05 min (2002)
- Mile run⁣ – 4:29.93 min (2003)
- 3000 metres⁣ – 8:49.31 min (2000)
- 3000 metres steeplechase⁣ – 9:28.47 min (2007)
- 5000 metres⁣ – 15:19.73 min (2005)
