= Hulshout =

- Municipality
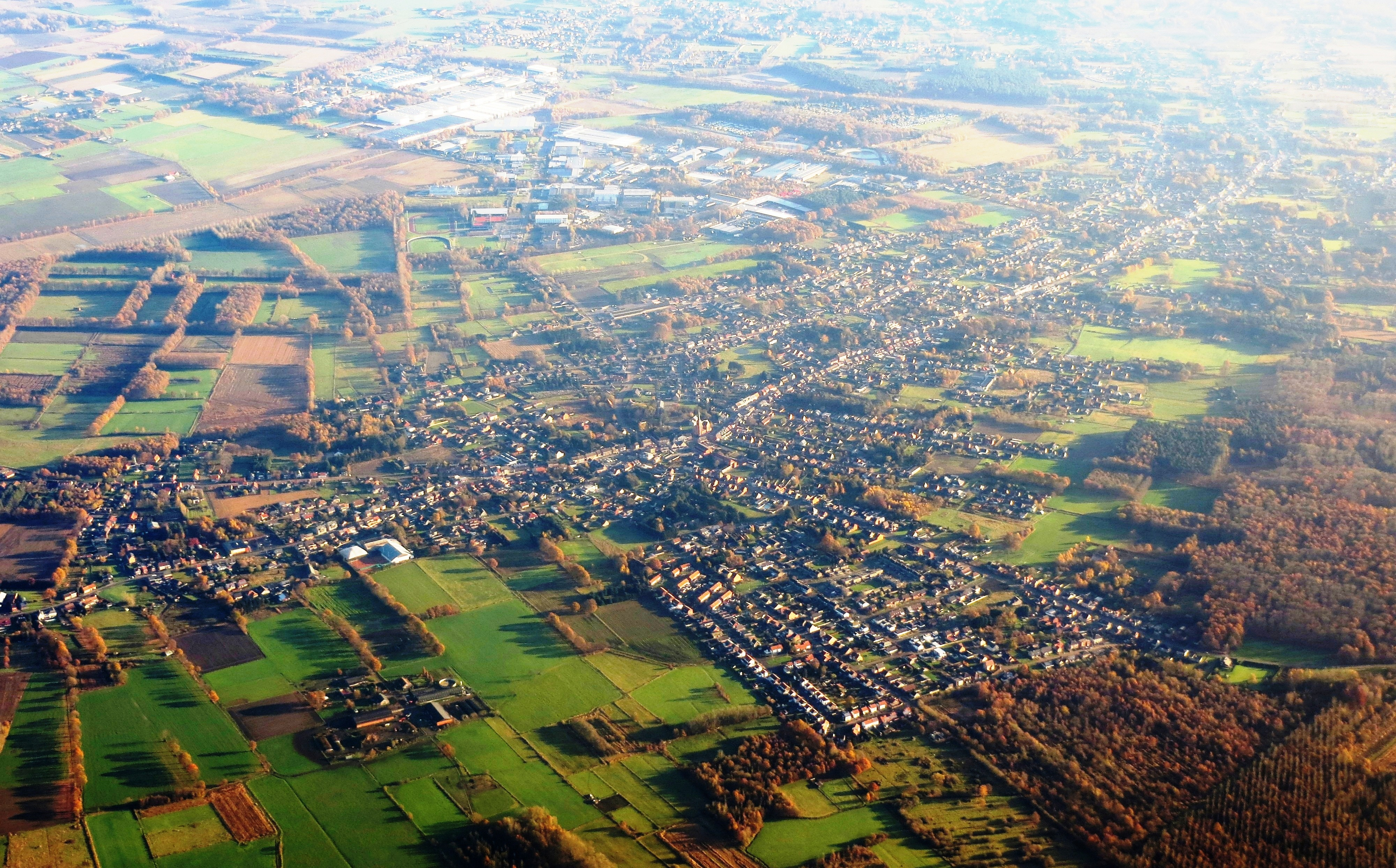

- Flag Coat of arms

- Location of Hulshout in the province of Antwerp
- Interactive map of Hulshout
- Location in Belgium
- Coordinates: 51°05′N 04°47′E
- Country: Belgium
- Community: Flemish Community
- Region: Flemish Region
- Province: Antwerp
- Arrondissement: Turnhout

Government
  - Mayor: Elien Bergmans (HOP)
  - Governing party: HOP

Area
  - Total: 17.38 km^{2} (6.71 sq mi)

Population (2025-01-01)
  - Total: 10,634
  - Density: 611.9/km^{2} (1,585/sq mi)
- Postal codes: 2235
- NIS code: 13016
- Area codes: 016, 015
- Website: www.hulshout.be

Hulshout (Dutch pronunciation: [ˈɦʏlsɦʌut]) is a municipality located in the Belgian province of Antwerp. The municipality comprises the towns of Houtvenne, Hulshout proper and Westmeerbeek. In 2021, Hulshout had a total population of 10,553. The total area is 17.35 km^{2}.

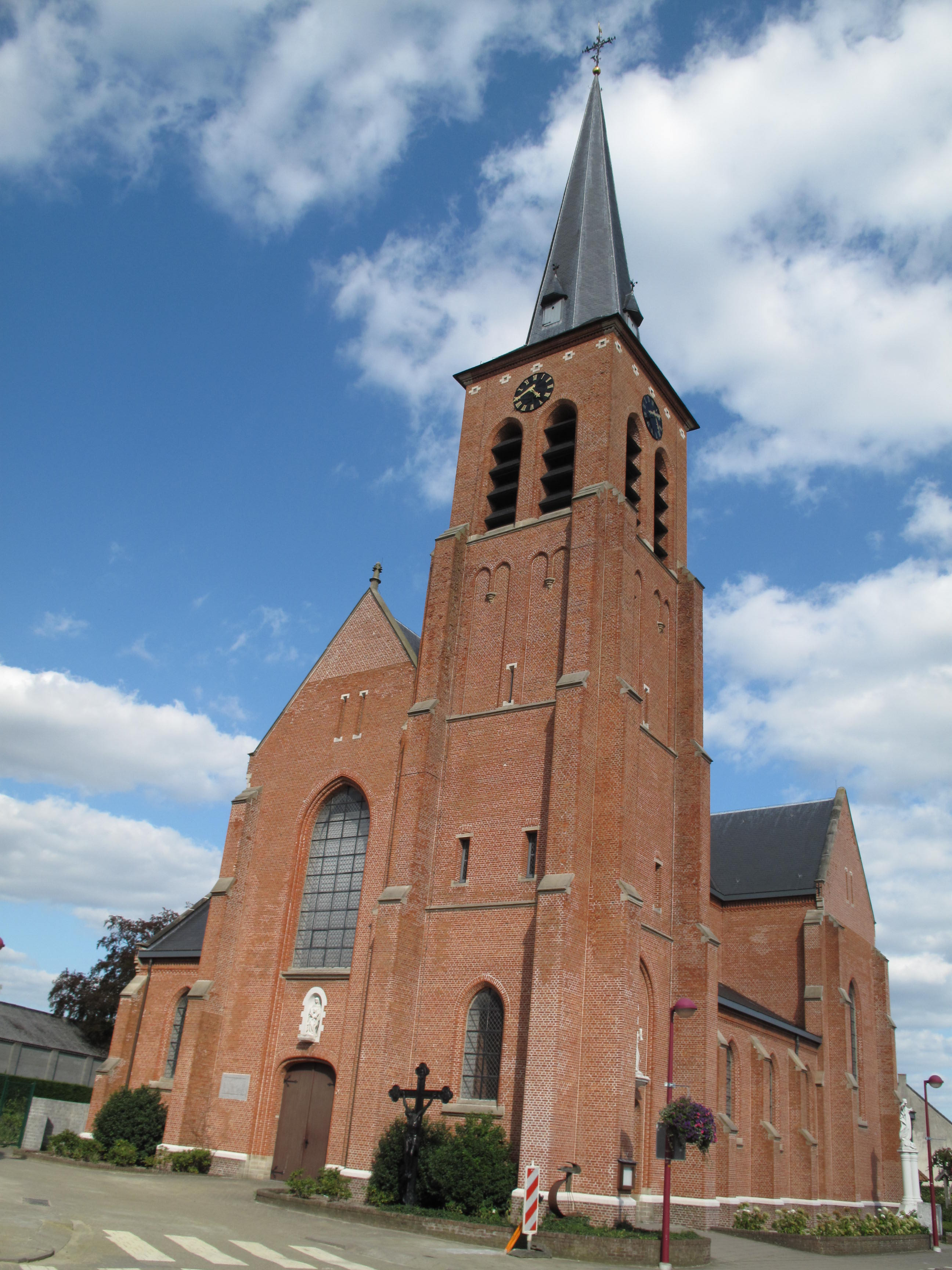
Hulshout church
