= Isaac Kimeli =

Kenyan-Belgian middle-distance runner

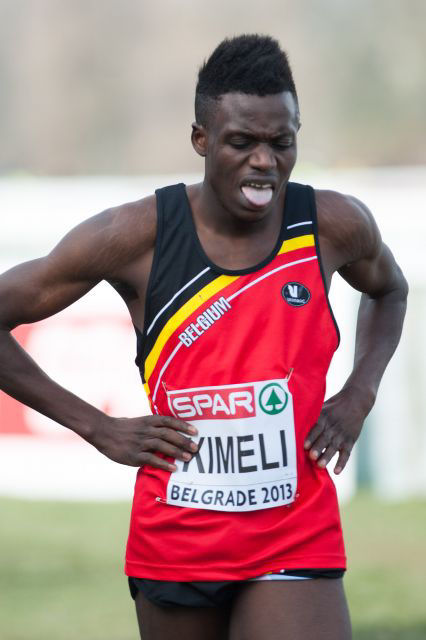
- Kimeli in 2013

Personal information
- Nationality: Kenyan-Belgian
- Born: 9 March 1994 (age 32) Uasin Gishu County, Kenya
- Height: 1.75 m (5 ft 9 in)
- Weight: 59 kg (130 lb)
- Spouse: Jelien Wouters

Sport
- Country: Belgium
- Sport: Athletics
- Events: Middle-, Long-distance running
- Coached by: Tim Moriau (–2024); Ivo Roelandt (2024-)
Medal record
Men's athletics
Representing Belgium
World Athletics Championships
Silver medal – second place	2025 Tokyo	5000 m
European Running Championships
Bronze medal – third place	2025 Brussels	10,000 m
European Indoor Championships
Silver medal – second place	2021 Toruń	3000 m
European U23 Championships
Silver medal – second place	2015 Tallinn	5000 m
European Cross Country Championships
Gold medal – first place	2016 Chia	U23 men
Silver medal – second place	2013 Belgrade	Junior men
Silver medal – second place	2018 Tilburg	Senior men
Silver medal – second place	2019 Lisbon	Senior team
Silver medal – second place	2024 Antalya	Senior team
Bronze medal – third place	2022 Turin	Senior men

Isaac Kimeli (born 9 March 1994 in Uasin Gishu County, Kenya) is a Kenyan born Belgian middle- and long-distance runner.

Kimeli is a 5000m silver medal winner at the World Athletics Championships.

Kimeli won two Diamond League meetings, securing victory in the 5000 m at the 2019 Memorial Van Damme in Brussels (promotional event) with a then personal best of 13:13.02 and six years later at the very rainy 2025 Athletissima meeting in Lausanne, Switzerland also in the 5000m.

== Training and personal life ==
When Kimeli was four years old, his mother migrated from their home county of Uasin Gishu in Kenya to Belgium to work as a nurse. Kimeli was left in the care of his grandparents for ten years. At age 15 he was finally reunited with his mother in Belgium. It was there that his PE teachers encouraged him to join a track club.

== Career ==
In 2011, Kimeli competed in his first international competition at the European Youth Olympic Festival in Trabzon, Turkey.

Two years later, Kimeli won his first international medal by winning a silver at the junior 2013 European Cross Country Championships in Belgrade, Serbia. This was soon followed by a gold medal at the Under-23 2016 European Cross Country Championships in Chia, Italy, and 2 silver medals (one individual, one team) and a bronze at the senior level 2018, 2019 and 2022 European Cross Country Championships resp. He picked up another silver medal with the Belgium men's team at the 2024 European Cross Country Championships in Antalya, Turkey.

On the track, Kimeli earned a silver in the 5000 metres at the 2015 European Athletics U23 Championships and in the 3000 metres at the 2021 European Athletics Indoor Championships.

Kimeli represented Belgium at the 2020 and 2024 Summer Olympics in Tokyo, Japan resp. Paris, France, his best result an 8th place in the final of the men's 5000 metres in Paris.

In September 2025 at the 2025 World Athletics Championships in Tokyo, Japan, Kimeli became the first Belgian athlete since Gaston Reiff won the gold medal in the men's 5000 metres at the 1948 Summer Olympics to win a medal in a 5000m or 10000m event at a senior world athletics championship or Olympic Games.

2026 was not a good year for Kimeli. Having entered the 2026 European Athletics Championships in Birmingham, England after an anonymous outdoor season, he finished a disappointing ninth in the men's 5000 metres and did not cross the finish line in the 10,000 metres. After the race, Kimeli announced that at the end of 2026, he would switch from track to road running and focus on the marathon.

== Achievements ==
=== Competition record ===
Representing Belgium
Year	Competition	Venue	Position	Event	Result
2011	European Youth Olympic Festival	Trabzon, Turkey	9th	1500 m	3:58.80
2012	European Cross Country Championships	Szentendre, Hungary	6th	XC 6.025 km U20	19:00
2013	World Cross Country Championships	Bydgoszcz, Poland	30th	XC 8 km U20	23:15
2013	European Cross Country Championships	Belgrade, Serbia	2nd	XC 6.025 km U20	17:51
2014	European Championships	Zürich, Switzerland	19th (h)	1500 m	3:41.96
2014	European Cross Country Championships	Samokov, Bulgaria	20th	XC 7.782 km U23	26:20
2015	European U23 Championships	Tallinn, Estonia	2nd	5000 m	13:54.33
2015	European Cross Country Championships	Hyères, France	38th	XC 8.087 km U23	24:27
2016	European Championships	Amsterdam, Netherlands	9th	1500 m	3:47.92
2016	European Cross Country Championships	Chia, Italy	1st	XC 7.97 km U23	22:48
2017	World Cross Country Championships	Kampala, Uganda	–	XC 9.858 km	DNF
2018	European Championships	Berlin, Germany	15th (h)	1500 m	3:42.77
2018	European Championships	Berlin, Germany	– (f)	5000 m	DQ
2018	European Cross Country Championships	Tilburg, Netherlands	2nd	XC 10.3 km	28:52
2019	European Team Championships First League	Sandnes, Norway	1st	3000 m	8:09.09
2019	World Championships	Doha, Qatar	18th (sf)	1500 m	3:37.50
2019	World Championships	Doha, Qatar	14th	5000 m	13:44.29
2019	European Cross Country Championships	Lisbon, Portugal	7th	XC 10.3 km	30:46
2019	European Cross Country Championships	Lisbon, Portugal	2nd	Team	38 pts
2021	European Indoor Championships	Toruń, Poland	2nd	3000 m	7:49.41
2021	Olympic Games	Tokyo, Japan	32nd (h)	5000 m	13:57.36
2021	Olympic Games	Tokyo, Japan	18th	10,000 m	28:31.91
2022	World Indoor Championships	Belgrade, Serbia	– (f)	3000 m	DNS
2022	World Championships	Eugene, OR, United States	10th	10,000 m	27:43.50 SB
2022	European Championships	Munich, Germany	11th	5000 m	13:33.39
2022	European Championships	Munich, Germany	– (f)	10,000 m	DNF
2022	European Cross Country Championships	Turin, Italy	3rd	XC 9.572 km	29:45
2023	World Championships	Budapest, Hungary	13th	10,000 m	28:20.77
2024	European Championships	Rome, Italy	14th	10,000 m	28:17.84
2024	Olympic Games	Paris, France	11th (h)	5,000 m	13:19.25
2024	Olympic Games	Paris, France	8th (f)	5,000 m	13:18.10
2024	Olympic Games	Paris, France	19th (f)	10,000 m	27:51.52
2025	European Running Championships	Brussels-Leuven, Belgium	3rd	10 km	27:58
2025	World Championships	Tokyo, Japan	2nd	5000 m	12:58.78
2026	European Championships	Birmingham, United Kingdom	9th	5000 m	13:23.17
2026	European Championships	Birmingham, United Kingdom	–	10,000 m	DNF

=== National titles ===
- Belgian Athletics Championships
  - 1500 metres: 2014
- Belgian Indoor Athletics Championships
  - 3000 metres: 2022
- Belgian Cross Country Championships
  - 2015, 2017, 2018, 2023, 2023, 2024

=== Personal bests ===
- 1500 metres – 3:36.51 (Marseille 2018)
- 3000 metres – 7:47.48 (Rome 2020)
  - 3000 metres indoor – 7:44.17 (Ghent 2021)
- 5000 metres – 12:56.53 (Stockholm 2024)
- 10,000 metres – 27:07.97 (San Juan Capistrano 2024)

Road

- 10 kilometres – 27:10 (Valencia 2025)
