= Charles Mertens =

Belgian painter (1865–1919)

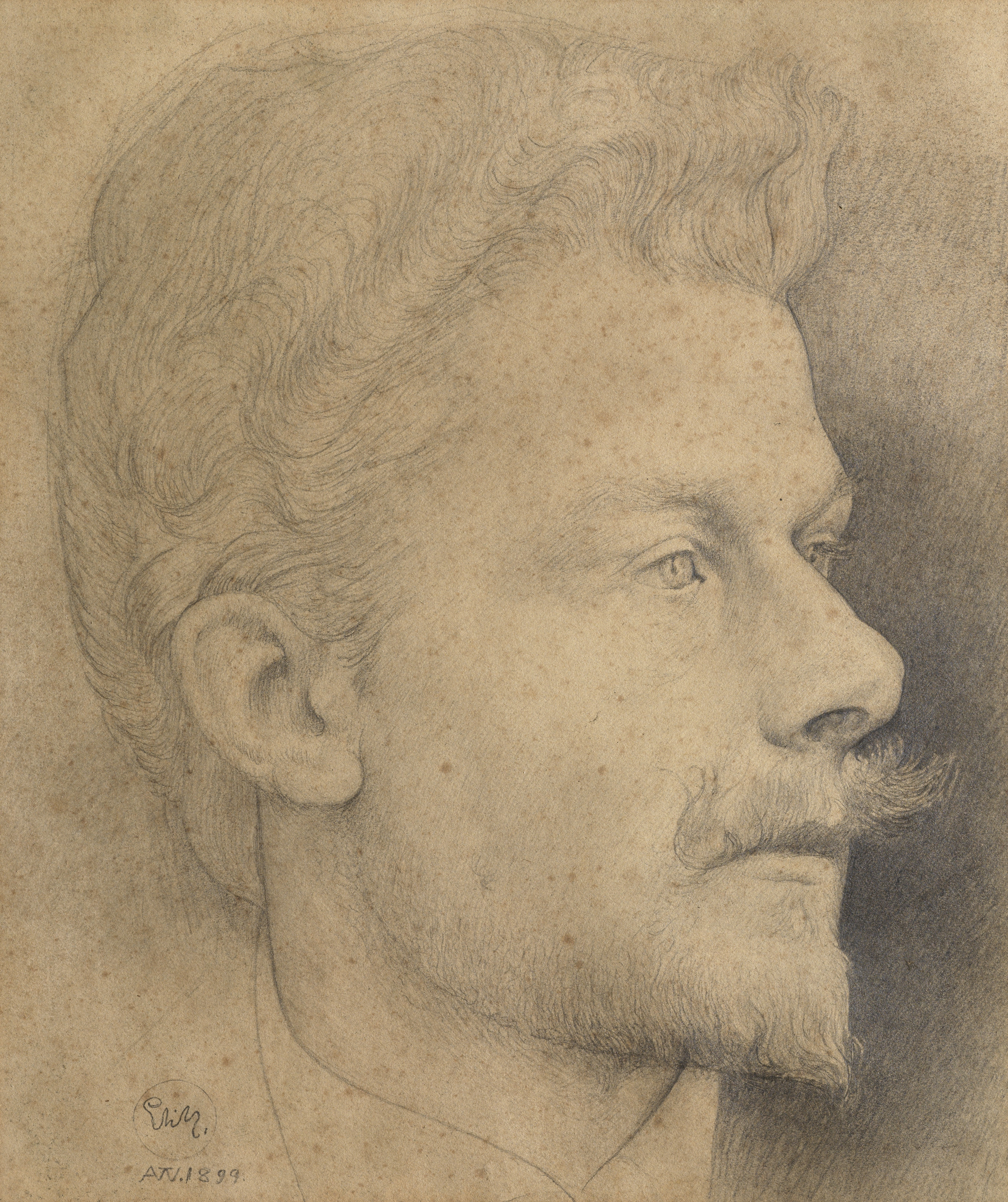
Charles Mertens, Self-portrait

Charles Mertens, Karel Jozef Mertens or Karel Mertens (Antwerp, 14 April 1865 – Calverley, England, 20 February 1919) was a Belgian draughtsman, painter, muralist, etcher and illustrator. He is known for his portraits, landscapes and genre scenes. He painted many scenes with fishermen and fishing boats.

== Life ==
Mertens was born in Antwerp as the son of a goldsmith. His uncle Jozef Mertens was a composer and conductor. After initially training as a goldsmith in his father's workshop, he studied at the Royal Academy of Fine Arts in Antwerp from 1876 to 1885. Charles Verlat was one of his teachers.

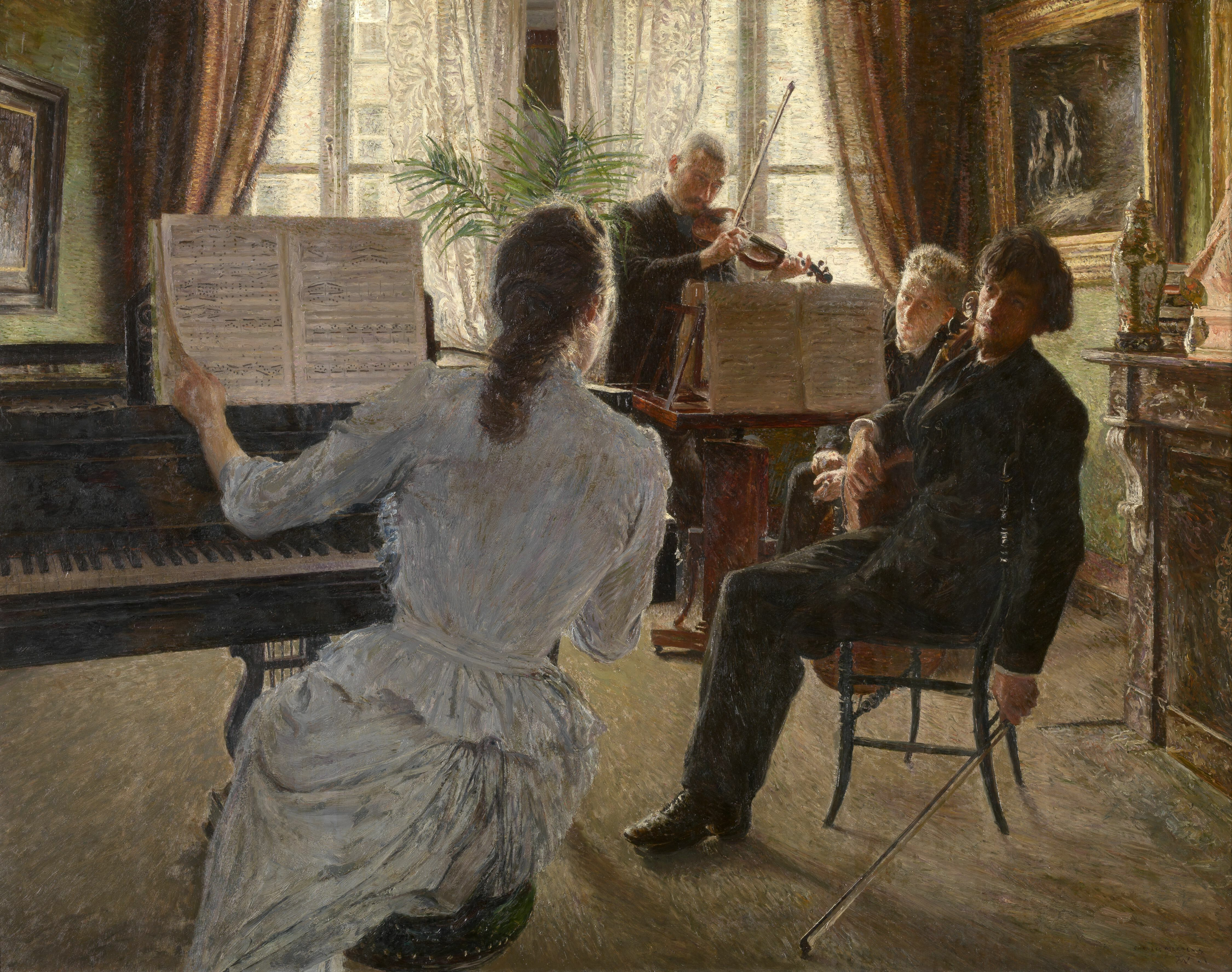
The trio

In 1883 he became a member of the artist group Als Ik Kan of Als ick kan (If I can) in Antwerp. The group had been founded on 25 October 1883 under the name Union Artistique des Jeunes (Artistic Union of Young People), but had become known mainly by its motto Als Ik Kan. The founders, who included the later prominent artist Henry Van de Velde, mainly aimed to create exhibition opportunities for its members, mostly young Antwerp artists, who had not yet entered the local official art exhibition circuit. The group did not include true avant-garde artists, except for Henry Van de Velde. Mertens remained a member of this group until 1892 and participated in all its exhibitions.

From 1886 he was appointed professor at the Academy of Antwerp. He was a founding member of the artist association called De XIII (or Cercle des XIII) established in Antwerp in February. The association was a Secessionist group which aimed to organise annual exhibitions of the work of its members outside the traditional Salons in which mainly Academic art was shown. Other members included artists such as Emile Claus (then still living in Antwerp), Edouard de Jans, Henri De Smeth, Edgar Farasyn, Maurice Hagemans, Frans Hens, Evert Larock, Romain Looymans, Henry Luyten, Henry Rul, Leo Van Aken, Louis Van Engelen, Piet Verhaert and Theodoor Verstraete. De XIII existed until 1899 and only managed to organise three art exhibitions during its existence. In these exhibitions, well-known artists such as Albert Baertsoen, Hubert Bellis, Franz Binjé, Albéric Collin, Adriaan Jozef Heymans, Fernand Khnopff, Max Liebermann, Constantin Meunier, Isidore Meyers, Jan Stobbaerts, Alexander Struys, Gustave Vanaise and Guillaume Van Strydonck participated.

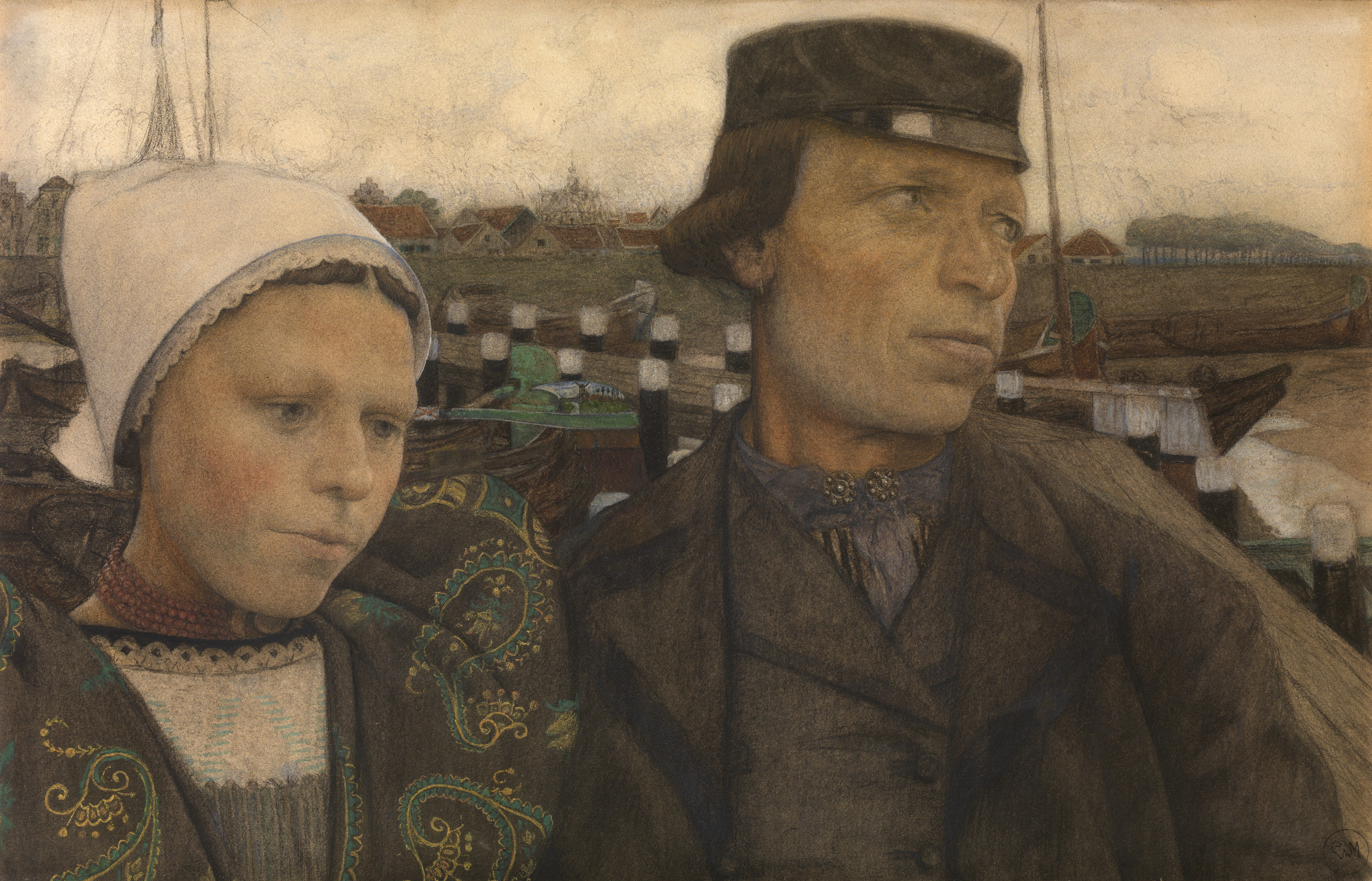
Couple from Zeeland

Mertens won medals at the World's fairs of 1889 and 1892. He submitted three paintings to the 1892 Ghent Salon, one of which entitled On the Scheldt was awarded the gold medal. He was in 1894 mentioned as a corresponding member of the Munich Secession, an association of visual artists who broke away from the mainstream Munich Artists' Association in 1892, to promote and defend their art in the face of what they considered official paternalism and its conservative policies In 1898 he exhibited 4 paintings at the fifth exhibition of the Brussels-based group La Libre Esthétique, an artistic group focused solely on organising exhibitions. He participated with 9 drawings in the 1900 Salon organised in Brussels by the Société des beaux-arts. In 1901 he exhibited 4 paintings at the ninth exhibition of La Libre Esthétique. He was represented in the international section at the Venice Biennale of 1901. On 1 March 1905, he was one of the founders in Antwerp of the association Kunst van Heden/L'Art contemporain, which grouped visual artists, art critics Pol De Mont, Arthur Cornette, Emmanuel de Bom, Paul Buschmann, among others) and art patrons such as Frans, Charles and Louis Franck, H. Fester, Frederic Speth and Cléomir Jussiant.

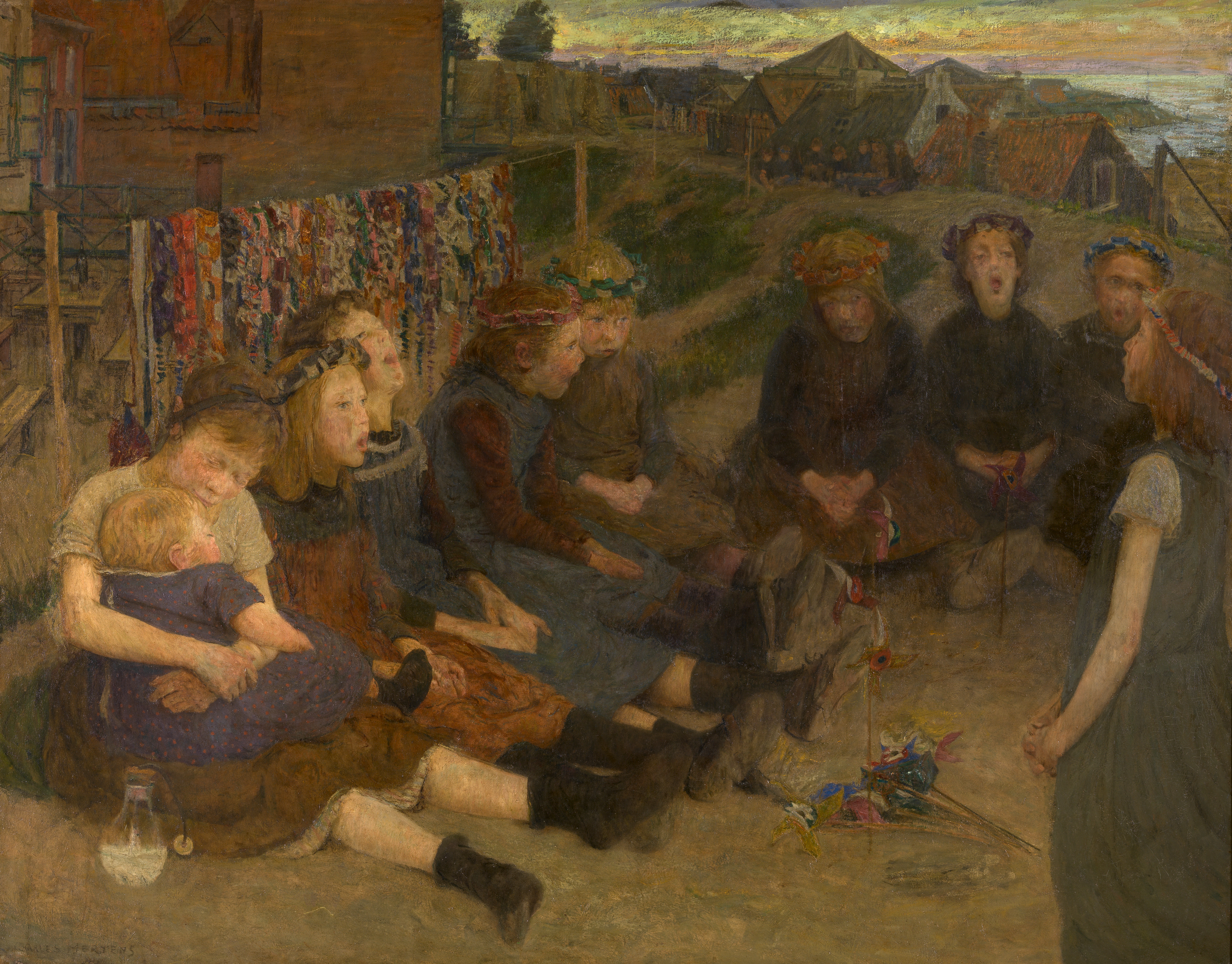
The game of the crown

In 1907 Mertens was commissioned to decorate the ceiling of the Antwerp Opera House.

During World War I, he lived and worked in England, where he resided in Calverley, near Leeds. He died there on 20 February 1919.

== Work ==
Mertens produced landscapes, city views, portraits and genre scenes. In his early period from 1883 to 1890 Mertens found much popular appreciation with mostly small paintings of genre scenes. These were executed in the style and with the technical perfection for which the Antwerp painters Ferdinand de Braekeleer and Henri de Braekeleer had become famous. Under the influence of foreign and domestic artistic developments he later dedicated himself to plein air painting.

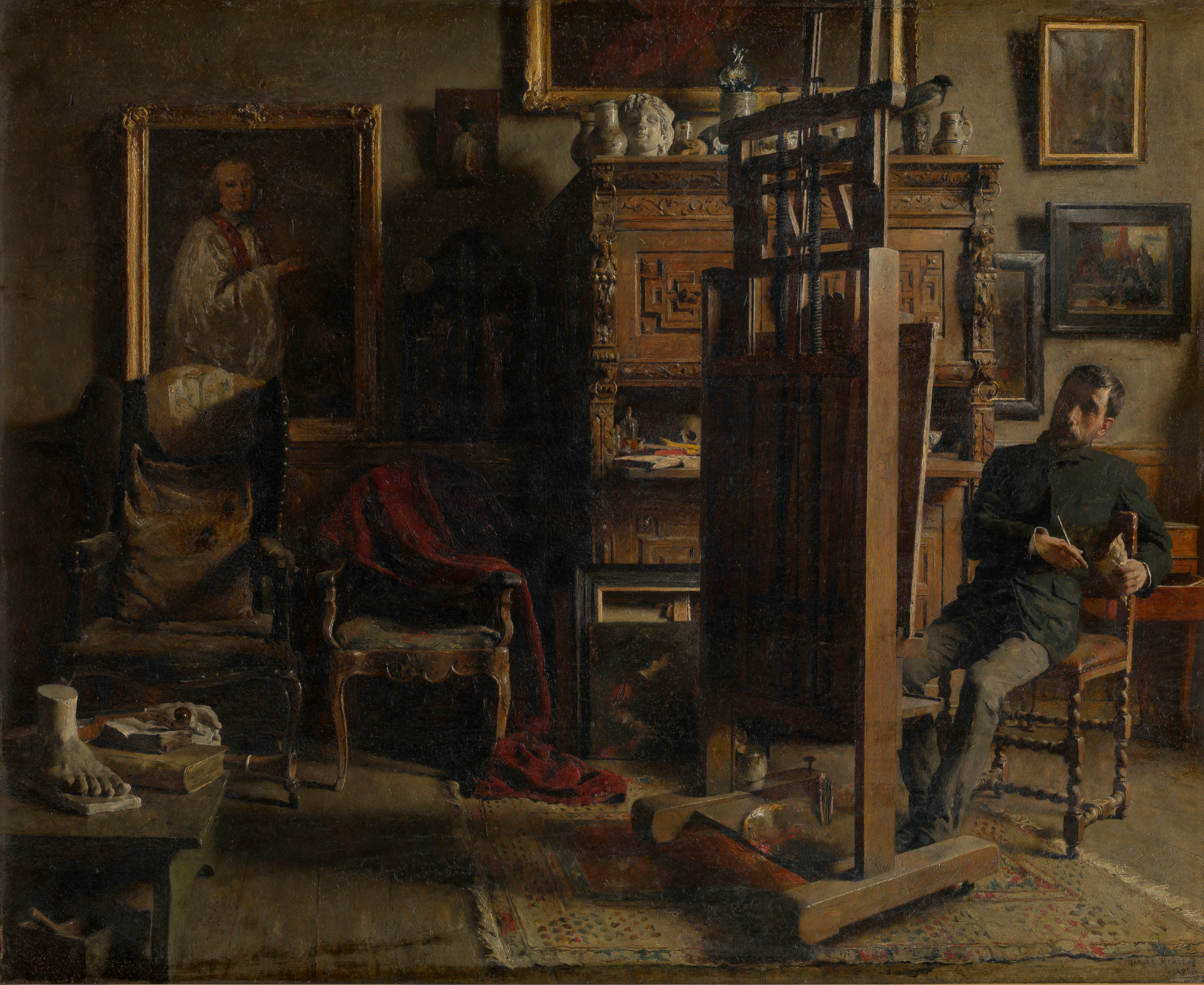
Jules Lambeaux in his atelier

From 1890, light became more important in his work. The attention to detailed representation gave way to a freer concept, based on the natural environment. He finally evolved towards the creation of pure atmosphere in soft tones. He was influenced by the Belgian painters Emile Claus and Théo van Rysselberghe who painted in a late-impressionist or neo-impressionist style which devotes great attention to light effects and is referred to as luminism. He also flirted with pointillism.

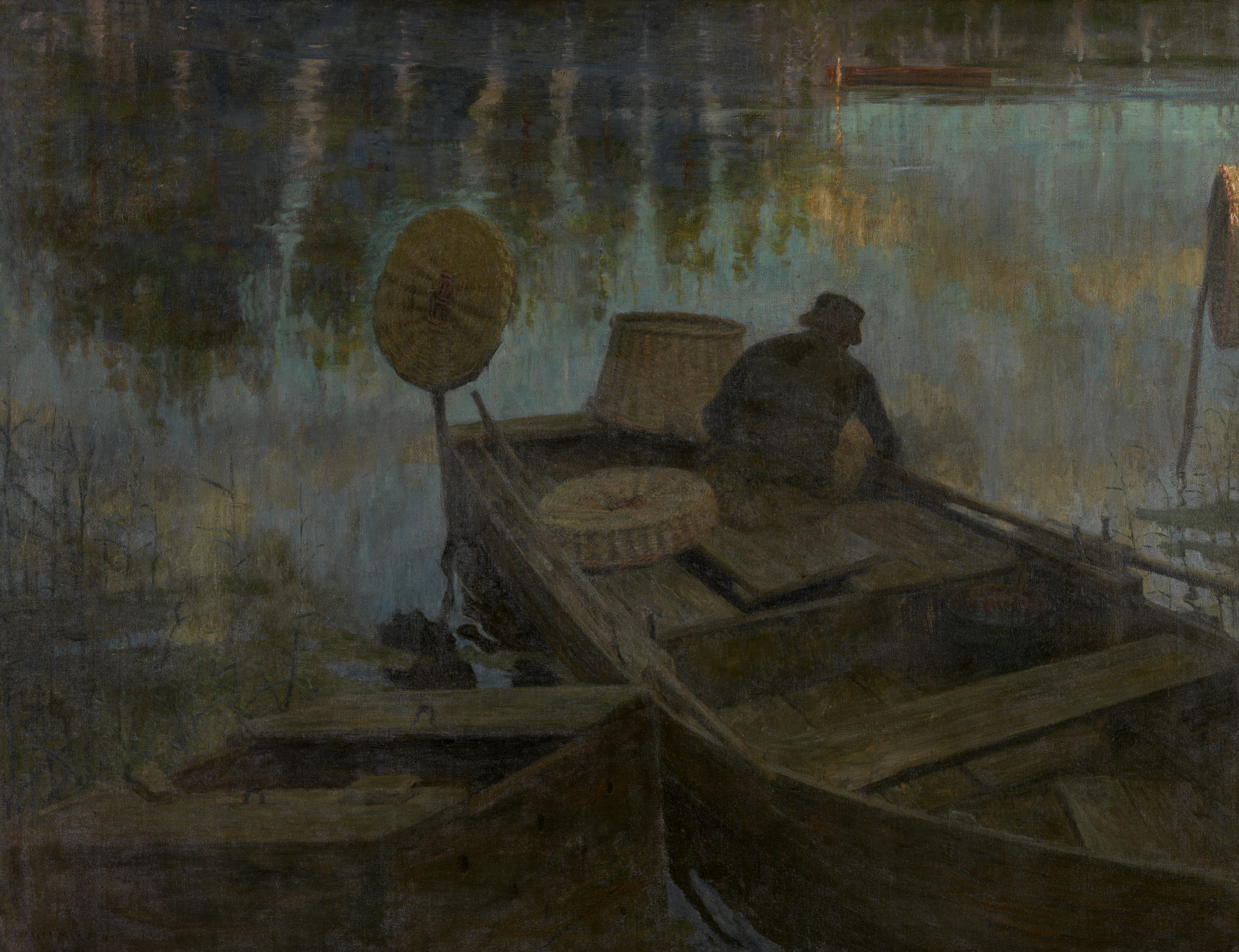
Fisherman in the moonlight

He had a fascination with the life of fishermen, fisher families and sailors and often returned to this subject matter. He painted boats on the Scheldt, the river which flows through Antwerp. He depicted fishermen mending their nets and hauling their boats, mussel fishermen, traditional fisher families of Zeeland in the Netherlands and canal areas. He worked regularly in Zeeland, where very clear works were created. In the painting Couple from Zeeland he combined a double portrait of a simple, dignified couple with a view of their home village and boat sails behind them. Although the couple is placed close to the picture plane, they seem aloof and absorbed in their own thoughts. The composition is dominated by the decorative rhythm of the mooring poles leading into the background and the embroidered jacket and headdress of the stoically resolute female figure.

He executed various portraits, principally of his fellow artists. The portraits are sober, precise, intimate and uncluttered. The almost dry execution is softened by the psychological depth shown in them. He painted two paintings, showing artists at work in their studios, in 1884 and 1885. The works depict the artist at work in his creative space in which the traditional ornaments and utensils of his artistic production are arranged: cabinets with carvings, a skull, a bust, rich fabrics draped over the furniture and a portrait in the style of Rembrandt on the wall. Mertens highlights the individuality of the artist working in a clearly depicted space. This stands in contrast to Henri De Braekeleer who in his studio views produced around the same period shows the painter from the back situated in a work space which is only summarily evoked.

Mertens was also active as an etcher. His etchings are original works used as illustrations for publications or made after his own paintings.
