= Chet Holifield Federal Building =

Building in California, US

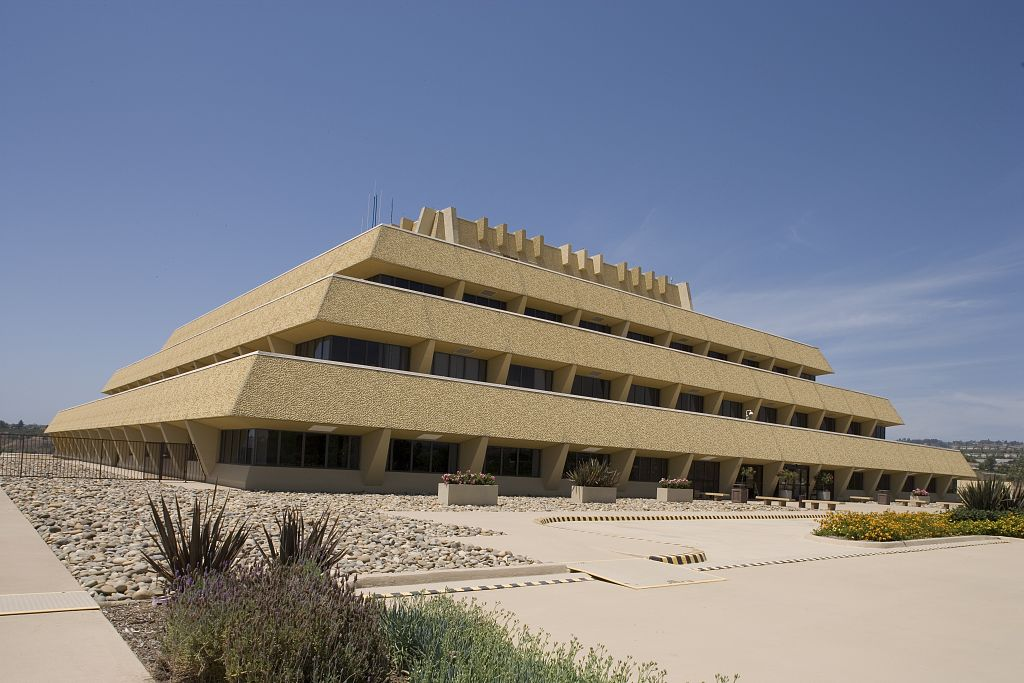
- The "Ziggurat" in 2006.
- Interactive map of the Chet Holifield Federal Building area
- Former names: Rockwell Autonetics, North American Aviation
- Alternative names: "The Ziggurat Building"

General information
- Architectural style: Postmodern
- Location: 24000 Avila Road, Laguna Niguel, California, United States of America
- Coordinates: 33°33′42″N 117°42′48″W
- Construction started: 1968
- Completed: 1971
- Client: Rockwell International
- Owner: General Services Administration

Technical details
- Structural system: Reinforced concrete
- Floor count: 7

Design and construction
- Architect: William L. Pereira & Associates
- Main contractor: Huber, Hunt & Nichols, Inc.

The Chet Holifield Federal Building, colloquially known as "the Ziggurat Building", is a United States government building in Laguna Niguel, California. It was built between 1968 and 1971 for North American Aviation/Rockwell International, and designed by William Pereira.

Since 1974, it has been owned and managed by the General Services Administration. National Archives and Records Administration had holdings for the Pacific region stored here, but has since moved to another location. Primary tenants are now regional offices of the United States Department of Homeland Security and the Internal Revenue Service.

== History ==
The building was designed by William Pereira, who developed a stepped pyramid silhouette that is rare in American architecture. The unusual form refers to ziggurats, which are ancient Mesopotamian temples.

The building was originally constructed in 1968 for North American Aviation, a defense and aerospace industries manufacturer, to house the company's corporate offices on the top floors and an electronics manufacturing plant on the bottom two floors. The building is located in the heart of a shallow valley surrounded by the San Joaquin Hills. The site was chosen in part because, in the mid-1960s, it was a quiet area of southern Orange County. North American Aviation wanted an area that would be private and secure. Construction took nearly three years, and in 1971, the building was completed. Huber, Hunt & Nichols, Inc. was the general contractor.

The building's construction was undertaken at a transformative time in the defense industry: while it was still under construction, North American Aviation merged with Rockwell International, a manufacturing conglomerate that worked in the defense and space industries. But, Rockwell never occupied the building.

There are a couple of accounts as to why this happened: The more common story is that as the Vietnam War was ending, Rockwell's defense contract with the federal government fell through. The company had a large building without enough work to support staff there.

William “Art” Morris, a corporate architect for North American, who contributed to the building's design, told the Orange County Register in 1993 that the building was deemed too fanciful for the defense contractor. “The chairman of the board came to take a tour,” Morris said of a 1969 visit to the building. “He got to the fourth floor and he said one thing, a short sentence: ‘This is far too nice for an electronics firm.’ And everything came to a screeching halt.”

Designed to accommodate 7,000 aerospace employees, after the acquisition by Rockwell the building sat empty for several years. Rockwell eventually offered to trade the building to the United States government in exchange for three surplus government facilities of equal value located near Los Angeles International Airport. In 1974, GSA assumed control of the building.

In 1978, the United States Congress passed a bill to rename the building in honor of Democratic Congressman Chester E. "Chet" Holifield, who had represented California's 19th congressional district from 1943 to 1974. Much of the building continued to be vacant for the next decade.

After GSA attempted to sell the building in the 1980s, it decided to keep it and assign agencies to it. This area of California had undergone rapid development while the building was held and federal agencies had increased staff in the area to serve the population. Today, the building's primary tenants are the United States Department of Homeland Security and the Internal Revenue Service. Holdings of the National Archives and Records Administration for the Pacific region were once located in the building but have since been relocated to a new center in Perris, California.

In 2019, the Chet Holifield Federal Building was one of five California properties on the list of Federal properties recommended for disposal by the Public Buildings Reform Board. In January 2024 it was listed for sale on the GSA auctions website with a starting bid of $70 Million. On June 30, 2026, General Services Administration announced that the building was sold to Hoag Memorial Hospital Presbyterian for $207 million.

== Architecture ==
Perhaps innovative for its time, the building has more recently been described as "appearing to be one part government building and two parts apocalyptic stronghold", and as a "white elephant."

The sculptural Chet Holifield Federal Building is a stepped pyramidal form that has a similar appearance to ancient ziggurats. Architect William L. Pereira designed it. A large portion of the more than one million square foot building is below grade. It is located on a 92-acre (370,000 m^{2}) parcel of land in Laguna Niguel, California, between Los Angeles and San Diego, and approximately 4 miles (6.4 km) from the Pacific coastline.

The building has seven tiers and is constructed of angled, painted, pre-cast concrete panels with reticulation, a textured finish that displays curvilinear forms. The building displays some characteristics of the Brutalist style of Modern architecture, which is distinguished by weighty, massive forms; rough, exposed concrete surfaces; broad, expansive wall planes; and recessed windows.

The building has a concrete frame; the lateral force-resisting system consists of concrete shearwalls and single-level concrete moment frames. It was constructed on spread footings and caissons. Anodized aluminum windows, which are separated by slanting concrete walls with triangular forms, are recessed between the horizontal levels. Evenly spaced windows provide a consistent rhythm to the symmetrical building, which has a sprawling horizontal emphasis. The top tier of the building has a large flat roof with attached protruding vertical elements, providing additional texture to the structure.

The east entrance is trapezoidal in form, referencing the overall shape of the building. A moat of smooth rocks surrounds the building on three sides, alluding to the idea that the massive structure is a modern-day fortress. A formal, classically inspired, symmetrical plaza is located outside of the main entrance. Grass panels, trees, landscaped beds, and planters greet visitors and provide contrast to the massive concrete structure. When the site was developed, more than 2,500 trees and 6,500 shrubs were included in the initial landscape plan. Concrete benches echo the materials and form of the building.

In the lobby, both escalators and elevators provide high-speed vertical movement. Pereira's efficient interior circulation system enabled a maximum travel time of approximately five minutes between any two points in the building. Select walls are covered in wood paneling and some areas contain wooden slat ceilings, several of which are coffered. Vinyl tile and carpet cover the floors. Portions of the interior were redesigned by GSA to accommodate increased office space.

Other buildings on the site include a maintenance warehouse; 500,000-gallon water tank that services the fire protection system; energy plant, cooling tower; a 1,000,000-gallon thermal energy storage tank; and security buildings. A heliport is located on the site and additional landscaped areas are found throughout the large parcel. When constructed, the complex had 6,200 parking spaces, which radiate diagonally along the building axes, in anticipation of the thousands of employees expected to occupy the facility.

In 2003, state-of-the-art upgrades and modifications to the roofing were completed as part of an energy-saving plan that saves $650,000 per year in utility costs. Elevators, critical to efficient circulation in the building, were upgraded in 2005.

=== Asbestos ===
At the time of construction, Asbestos (ACM) materials were commonly used in buildings for fire-proofing and insulation. Regulated ACM at the CHFB consisted primarily of spray-on resistant material applied to the first floor ceiling structure and thermal insulation pipe wrap used in the first, second and third floors. A March 2021 environmental impact report stated that asbestos dust was identified above the ceiling tiles on all floors of the building. The above-ceiling plenum space was designated as a controlled space and access was restricted without permission from building management. Air sampling conducted in all storage rooms, file rooms, common areas and offices in February 2020 indicated there were no health hazards from air-borne asbestos in sampled areas and levels were below USEPA thresholds.

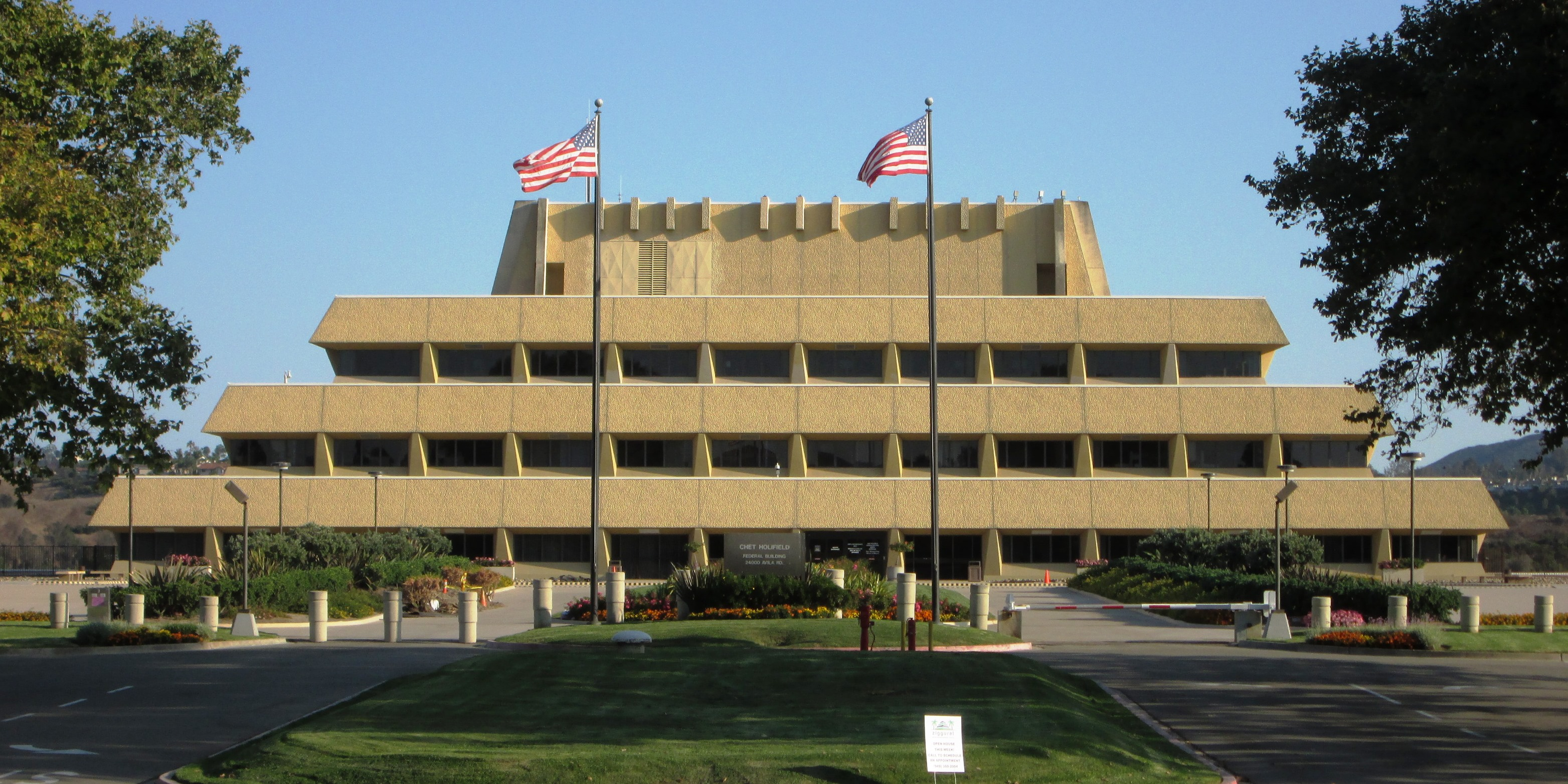
The north entrance in 2013

== Timeline ==
- 1968: Construction commences.
- 1971: Construction completed.
- 1974: GSA assumes ownership of building.
- 1975: Used in filming of Death Race 2000.
- 1978: Building renamed to honor Chet Holifield.
- 1995: Exterior used in filming of movie Outbreak, starring Dustin Hoffman and Rene Russo. Building signage stated USAMRIID.
- 2003: Energy-efficient roofing upgrade completed.
- 2019: Recommended for disposal by the Public Buildings Reform Board.

== In popular culture ==
The building's unique form has been featured in several films, including Death Race 2000 (1975), Coma (1978), Deal of the Century (1983), and Outbreak (1995).

== See also ==
- The Ziggurat, a similar building in Sacramento, California, was constructed for a private corporation. It is now leased by state government offices.
- Ernest Feysplein in Ostend, Belgium.
