= Ziggurat =

Type of massive terraced structure of ancient Mesopotamia

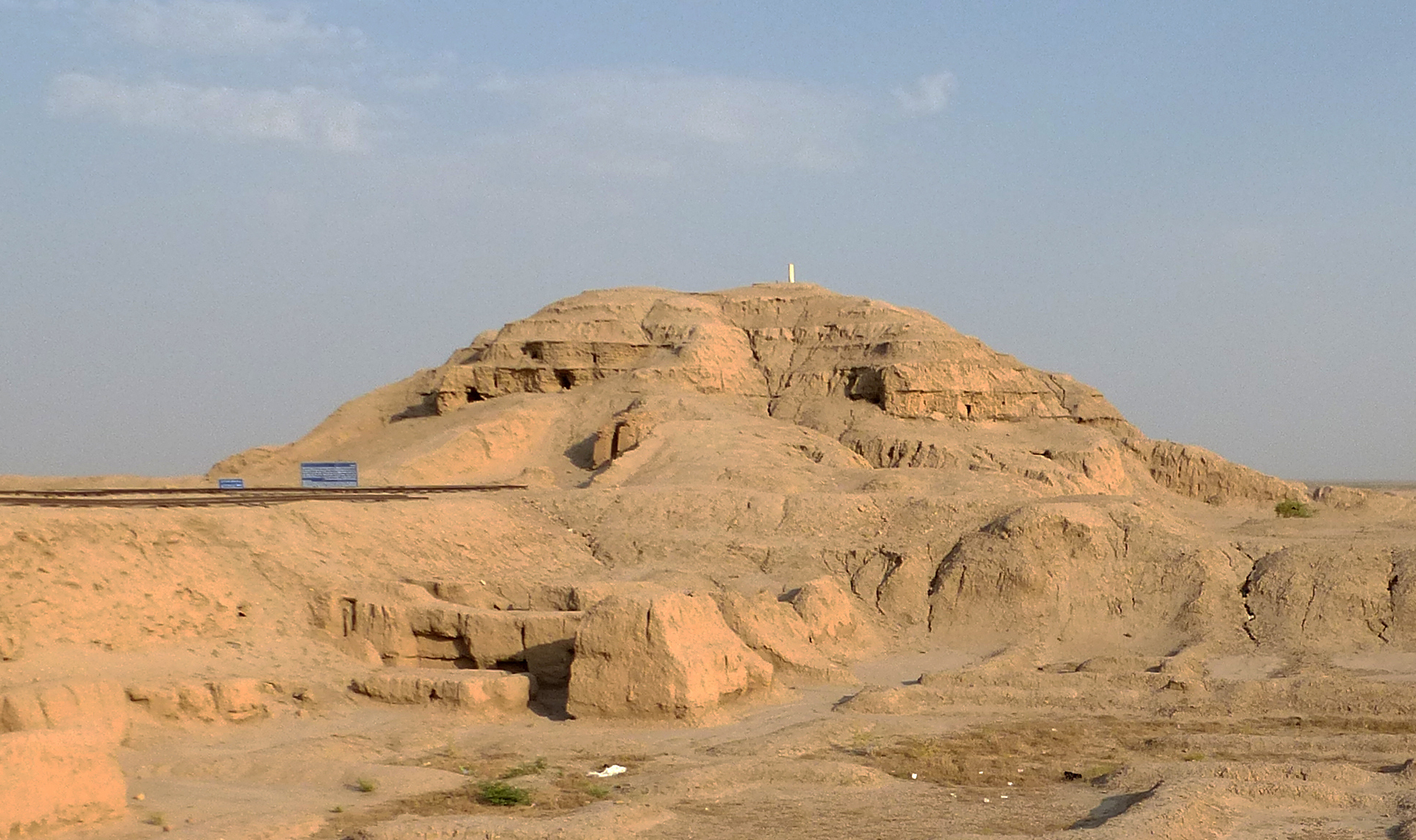
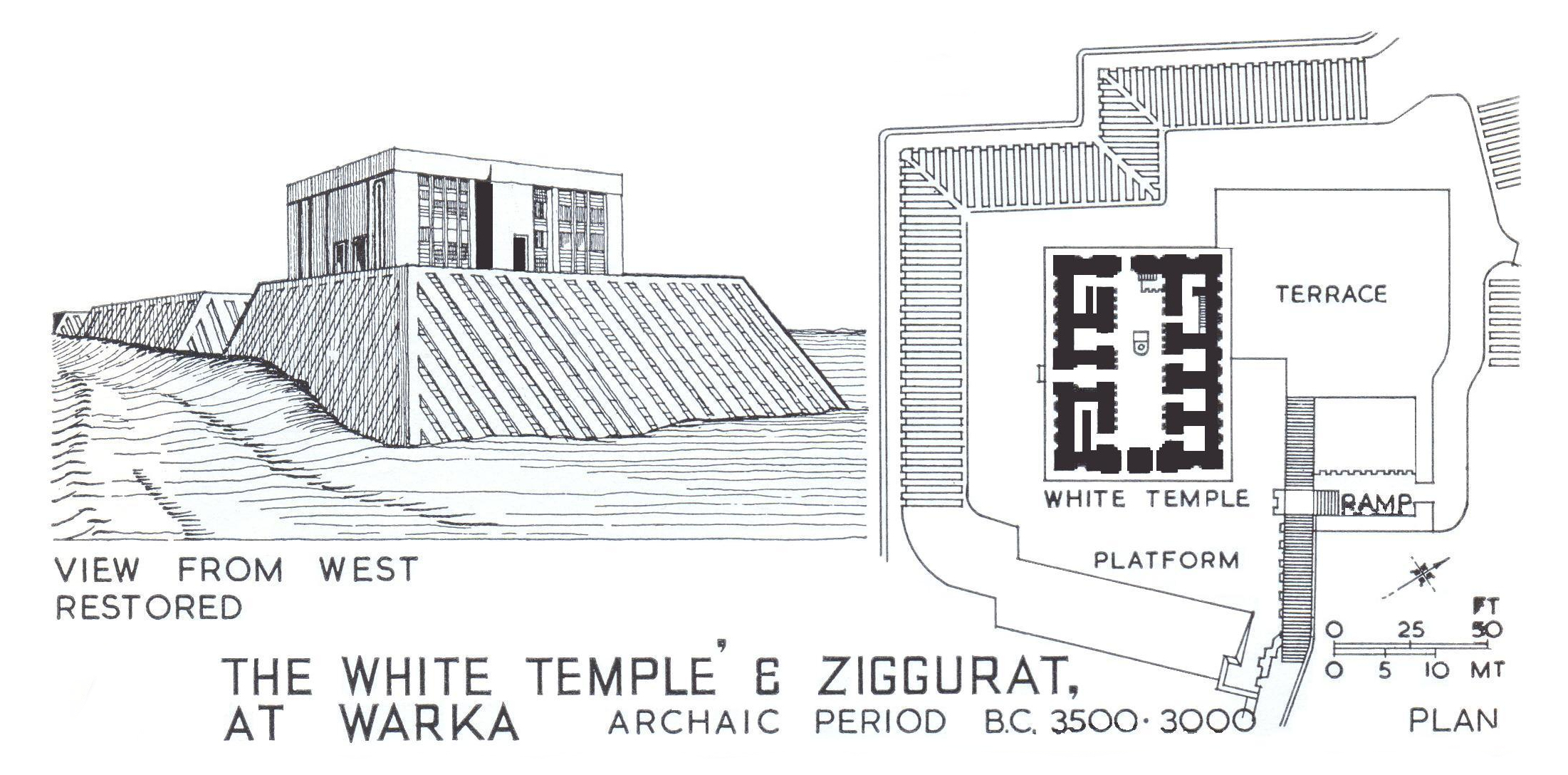
Anu ziggurat and White Temple at Uruk. The original pyramidal structure, the "Anu Ziggurat", dates to the Sumerians around 4000 BC, and the White Temple was built on top of it circa 3500 BC.

A ziggurat (/ˈzɪɡʊˌræt/); Cuneiform: 𒅆𒂍𒉪, is a type of massive structure built in ancient Mesopotamia and Iran. It has the form of a terraced compound of successively receding stories or levels. Notable ziggurats include the Great Ziggurat of Ur near Nasiriyah, the Ziggurat of Aqar Quf near Baghdad, the no longer extant Etemenanki in Babylon, Chogha Zanbil in Khūzestān and Sialk. The Sumerians believed that the gods lived in the temple at the top of the ziggurats, so only priests and other highly-respected individuals could enter. Sumerian society offered these gods such gifts as music, harvested produce, and the creation of devotional statues to entice them to live in the temple.

== Etymology and history ==
The ziggurat comes from Akkadian: ziqqurratum, D-stem of zaqārum 'to protrude, to build high', cognate with other Semitic languages like Hebrew zaqar (זָקַר) 'protrude'). The Ziggurat of Ur is a Neo-Sumerian ziggurat built by King Ur-Nammu, who dedicated it in honor of Nanna/Sîn in approximately the 21st century BC during the Third Dynasty of Ur. Ziggurats are markers of Mesopotamian cities from approximately 2200 until 500 BCE.

== Description ==
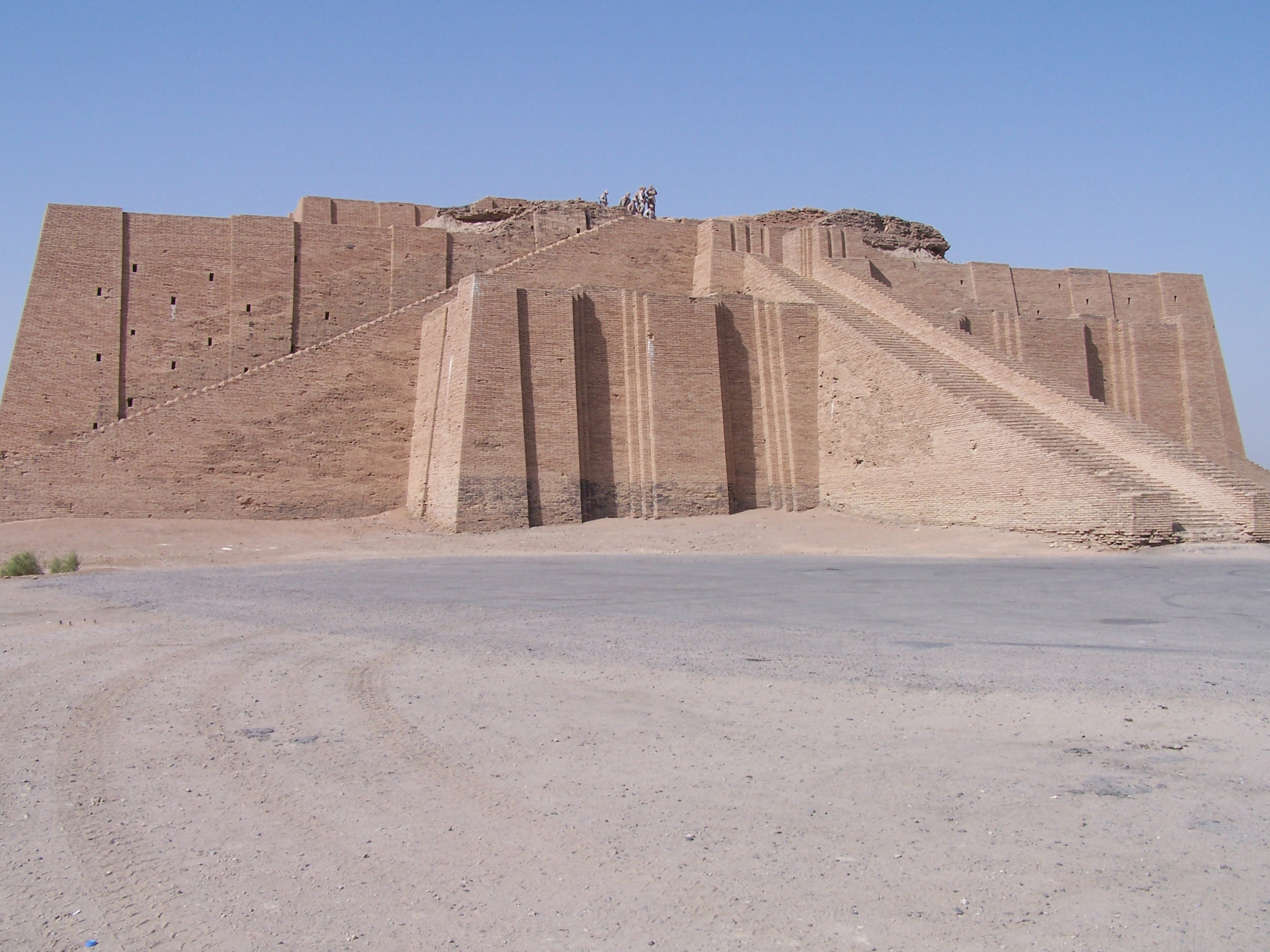
Partially reconstructed facade and access staircase of the Ziggurat of Ur, originally built by Ur-Nammu, circa 2100 BC

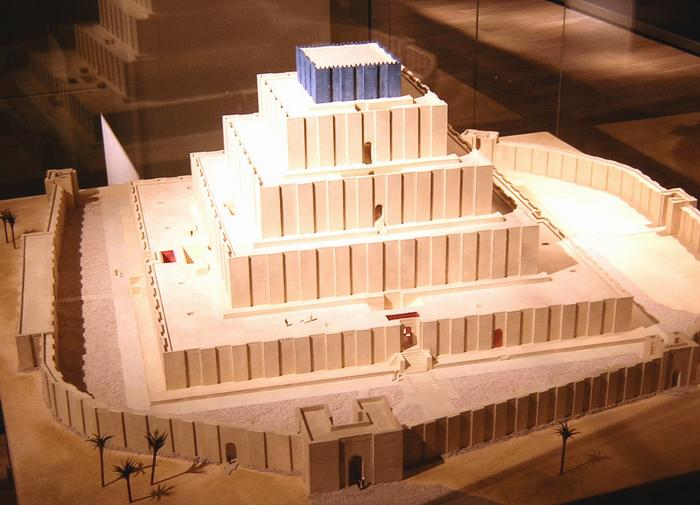
Chogha Zanbil Ziggurat (model). Circa 1300 BC

Ziggurats were built by ancient Sumerians, Akkadians, Kassites, Elamites, Eblaites and Babylonians for local religions. Each ziggurat was part of a temple complex with other buildings. Before the ziggurats there were raised platforms that date from the Ubaid period during the sixth millennium BCE. The ziggurats began as platforms (usually oval, rectangular or square). The ziggurat was a mastaba-like structure with a flat top. The sun-baked bricks made up the core of the ziggurat with facings of fired bricks on the outside. Each step was slightly smaller than the step below it. The facings were often glazed in different colors and may have had astrological significance. Kings sometimes had their names engraved on these glazed bricks. The number of floors ranged from two to seven.

According to archaeologist Harriet Crawford,

It is usually assumed that the ziggurats supported a shrine, though the only evidence for this comes from Herodotus, and physical evidence is non-existent ... The likelihood of such a shrine ever being found is remote. Erosion has usually reduced the surviving ziggurats to a fraction of their original height, but textual evidence may yet provide more facts about the purpose of these shrines. In the present state of our knowledge it seems reasonable to adopt as a working hypothesis the suggestion that the ziggurats developed out of the earlier temples on platforms and that small shrines stood on the highest stages ...

Access to the shrine would have been by a series of ramps on one side of the ziggurat or by a spiral ramp from base to summit. The Mesopotamian ziggurats were not places for public worship or ceremonies. They were believed to be dwelling places for the gods, and each city had its own patron god. Only priests were permitted on the ziggurat or in the rooms at its base, and it was their responsibility to care for the gods and attend to their needs. The priests were very powerful members of Sumerian and Assyro-Babylonian society.

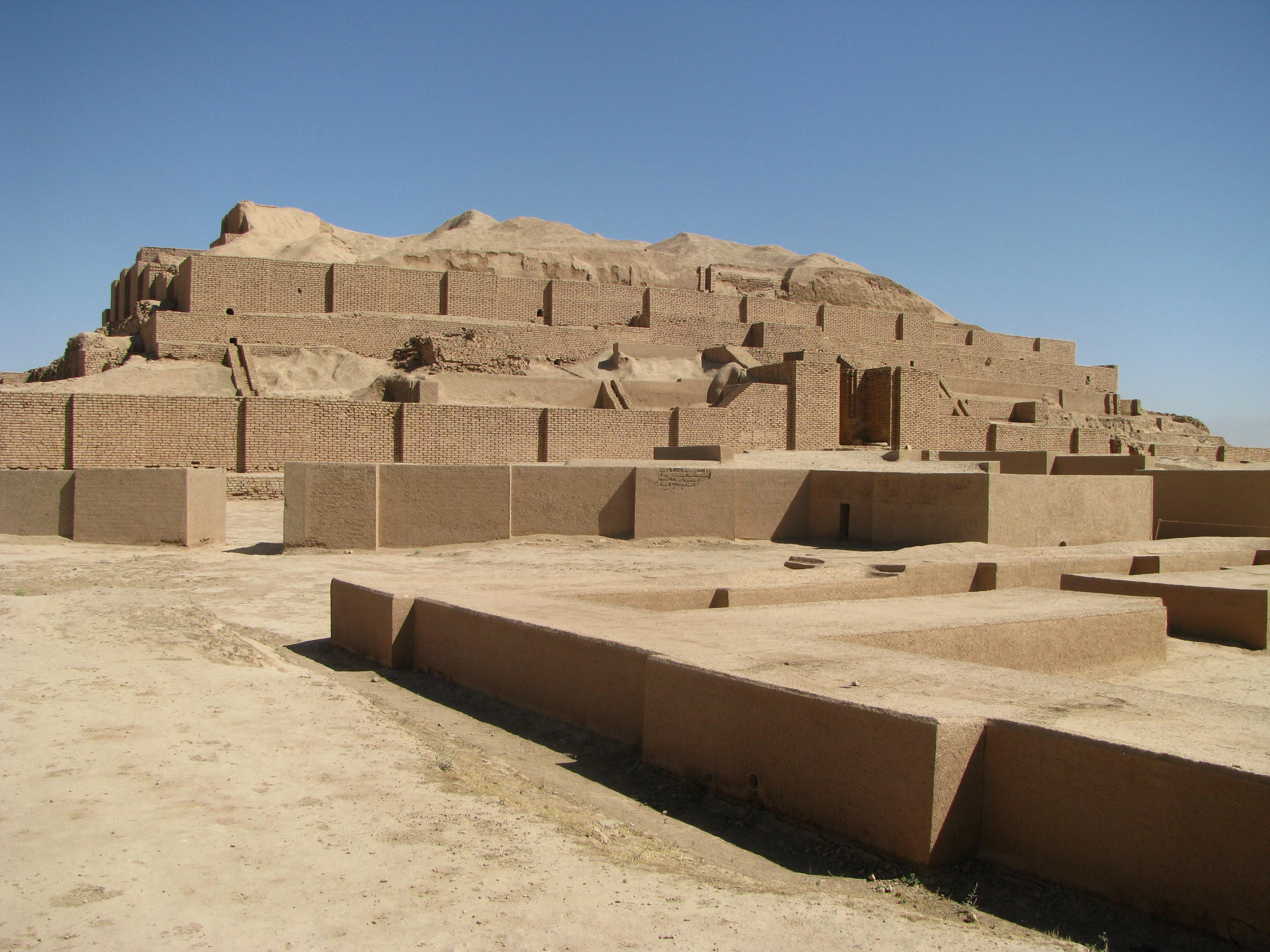
Elamite Ziggurat of Dur Untash in Persian Choqa Zanbil in Khuzestan, Iran, circa 1300 BC

One of the best-preserved ziggurats is Chogha Zanbil in western Iran. Ziggurat designs ranged from simple bases upon which a temple sat, to marvels of mathematics and construction which spanned several terraced stories and were topped with a temple.

An example of a simple ziggurat is the White Temple of Uruk, in ancient Sumer. The ziggurat itself is the base on which the White Temple is set. Its purpose is to get the temple closer to the heavens, and provide access from the ground to it via steps. The Mesopotamians believed that these pyramid temples connected heaven and earth. In fact, the ziggurat at Babylon was known as Etemenanki, which means "House of the foundation of heaven and earth" in Sumerian.

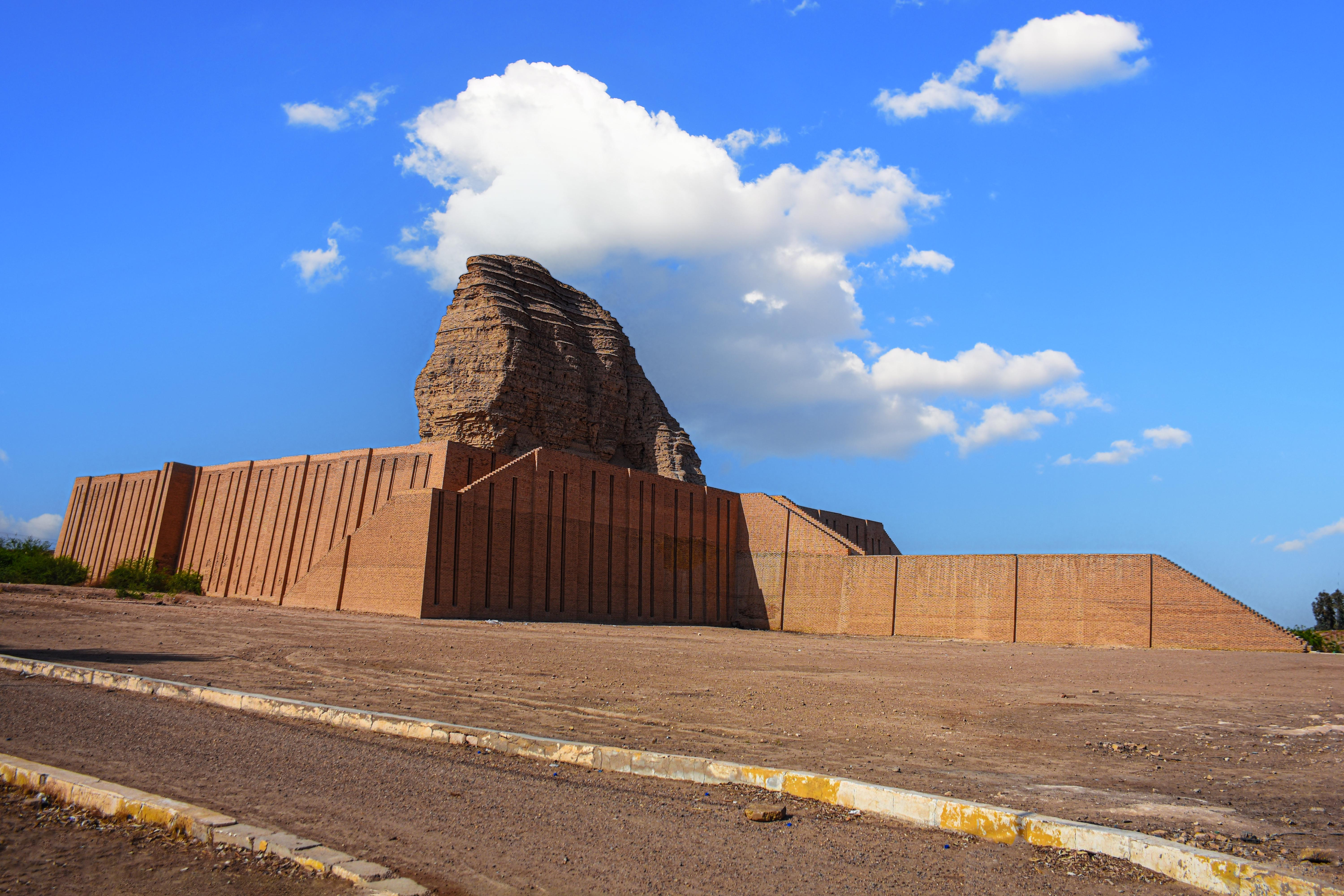
Aqar Quf (Dur-Kurigalzu) ziggurat

The date of its original construction is unknown, with suggested dates ranging from the fourteenth to the ninth century BC, with textual evidence suggesting it existed in the second millennium. Unfortunately, not much of even the base is left of this massive structure, yet archeological findings and historical accounts put this tower at seven multicolored tiers, topped with a temple of exquisite proportions. The temple is thought to have been painted and maintained an indigo color, matching the tops of the tiers. It is known that there were three staircases leading to the temple, two of which (side flanked) were thought to have only ascended half the ziggurat's height.

== Interpretation and significance ==
According to Herodotus, at the top of each ziggurat was a shrine, although none of these shrines have survived. Functionally, ziggurats offered a high place on which priests could escape rising water that annually inundated lowlands and occasionally flooded for hundreds of kilometers. They also offered security; since the shrine was accessible only by way of three stairways, a small number of guards could prevent non-priests from spying on the rituals at the shrine on top of the ziggurat, such as initiation rituals, cooking of sacrificial food and burning of sacrificial animals. Each ziggurat was part of a temple complex that included a courtyard, storage rooms, bathrooms, and living quarters, around which a city spread, as well as a place for the people to worship. It was considered to be a sacred structure.

== Influence ==
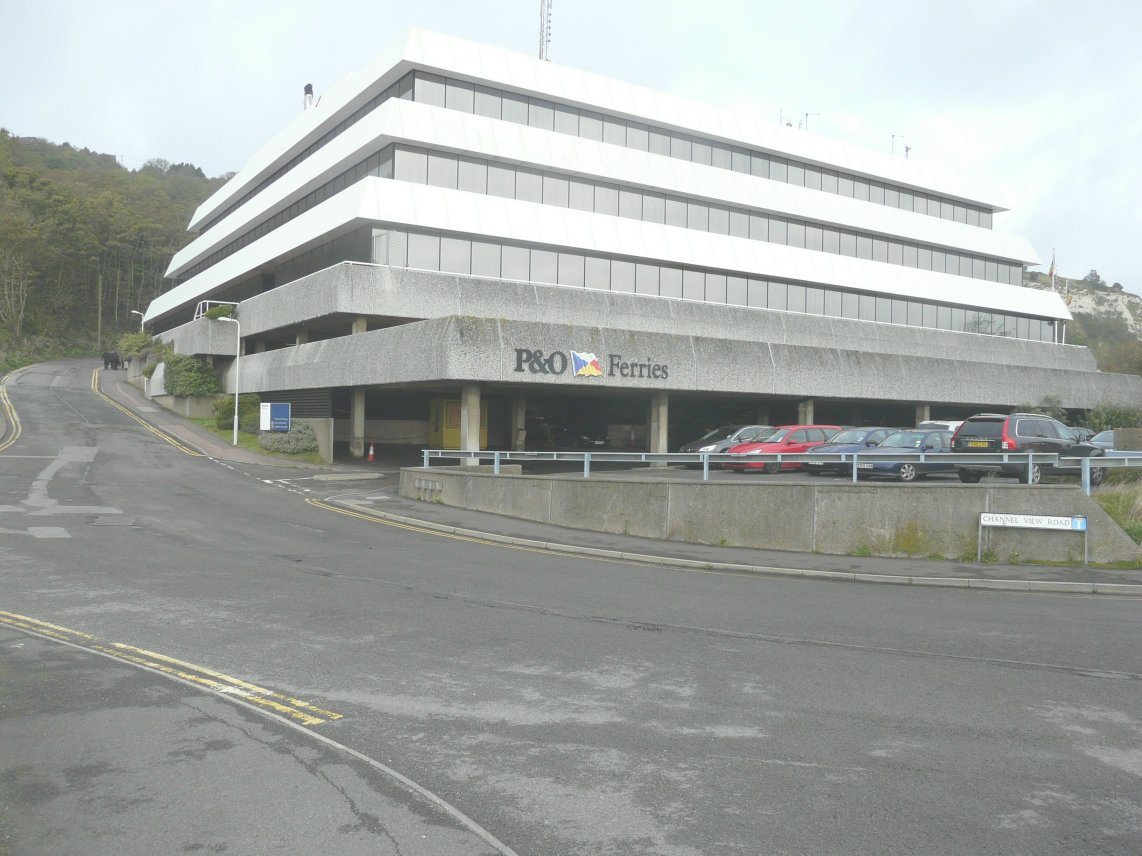
P&O building at the Port of Dover.

The biblical account of the Tower of Babel has been associated by modern scholars to the massive construction undertakings of the ziggurats of Mesopotamia, and in particular to the ziggurat of Etemenanki in Babylon in light of the Tower of Babel Stele describing its restoration by Nebuchadnezzar II.

According to some historians the design of Egyptian pyramids—especially the stepped designs of the oldest pyramids (Pyramid of Zoser at Saqqara, 2600 BCE)—may have been an evolution from the ziggurats built in Mesopotamia. Others say the Pyramid of Zoser and the earliest Egyptian pyramids may have been derived locally from the bench-shaped mastaba tomb.

Although having only crude formal shape, which can be compared to the stepped ziggurats, the shape of the ziggurat experienced a revival in modern architecture and Brutalist architecture starting in the 1970s. The Al Zaqura Building is a government building situated in Baghdad. It serves the office of the prime minister of Iraq. The Babylon Hotel in Baghdad is also inspired by the ziggurat. The Chet Holifield Federal Building is colloquially known as "the Ziggurat" due to its form. It is a United States government building in Laguna Niguel, California, built between 1968 and 1971. Further examples include The Ziggurat in West Sacramento, California, the SIS Building in London, the Residentie Royal Ascot and Ernest Feysplein in Ostend, Belgium, and the Linnahall building in Tallinn, Estonia.

== See also ==
- Category:Ziggurat style modern architecture
- Hanging Gardens of Babylon – One of the Seven Wonders of the Ancient World
- Minoan palace – Ancient Minoan buildings in Crete
- Mound – Heaped pile of earth, gravel, sand, rocks, or debris
- Pagoda – Usually religious tower in Asian countries
- Pyramid – Structure shaped as a geometric pyramid
- Stupa – Domed structure containing Buddhist relics
