= The Money Store (company) =

American-based loan company

Coordinates: 40.78372°N 74.37127°W

MLD Mortgage, Inc. dba The Money Store
- Type: Private
- Industry: Mortgage
- Founded: 1967
- Headquarters: Florham Park, New Jersey, United States
- Number of locations: licensed in 48 states
- Key people: Morton Dear, Chairman Emeritus; Gary Dear, Chairman and CEO
- Products: Mortgage loan
- Services: Mortgage Lending
- Parent: MLD Mortgage, Inc.
- Website: www.themoneystore.com

The Money Store is a U.S. residential mortgage lending brand owned by MLD Mortgage, Inc., a consumer finance company that is based in Florham Park, New Jersey with offices nationwide.

== History ==
The earliest iterations of The Money Store date back to 1967 when Alan Turtletaub operated mortgage lending firms in New Jersey and Pennsylvania. In 1972, "The Money Store" name was trademarked to promote the various firms. The company was based in Union, New Jersey. It specialized in home equity loans and also was a large Small Business Administration lender. Baseball Hall of Famer Phil Rizzuto (with his "holy cow" ads) was a longtime advertising pitchman for the company. He was then followed by Jim Palmer, another Hall of Famer.

Alan was succeeded as president by his son, Marc Turtletaub. In 1991, the company went public, and in 1997 was listed on the New York Stock Exchange. After a major revamping and consolidation effort, most of its corporate employees transferred to the newly built headquarters at The Ziggurat building in West Sacramento, California between 1996 and 1997.

The company was sold to First Union Corp. of Charlotte, N.C., for $2.1 billion in June 1998. First Union, preparing for the Wachovia merger, split The Money Store into four divisions, transferred First Union's bad home equity loans into The Money Store's home equity division, and two years later took a loss provision of $1.7 billion to shut down the business. However, the student loan division, Educaid, and the SBA loan division were retained by First Union.

In 2006, Wachovia (formerly First Union) sold The Money Store name to MLD Mortgage, Inc. Morton Dear, chief financial officer of original The Money Store, is the founder and chairman of the new incarnation.

== Notable people ==
- Marcus Gaither (1961–2020), American-French basketball player
- Jim Palmer (born 1945), spokesman for The Money Store, 1992–1995, and Baseball Hall of Fame pitcher for the Baltimore Orioles
- Phil Rizzuto (1917-2007), spokesman for The Money Store and Hall of Fame shortstop for the New York Yankees
- Alan Turtletaub (1913–2005), founder of The Money Store
- Marc Turtletaub (born 1946), former CEO of The Money Store and film producer
