= California Department of General Services =

California state government agency

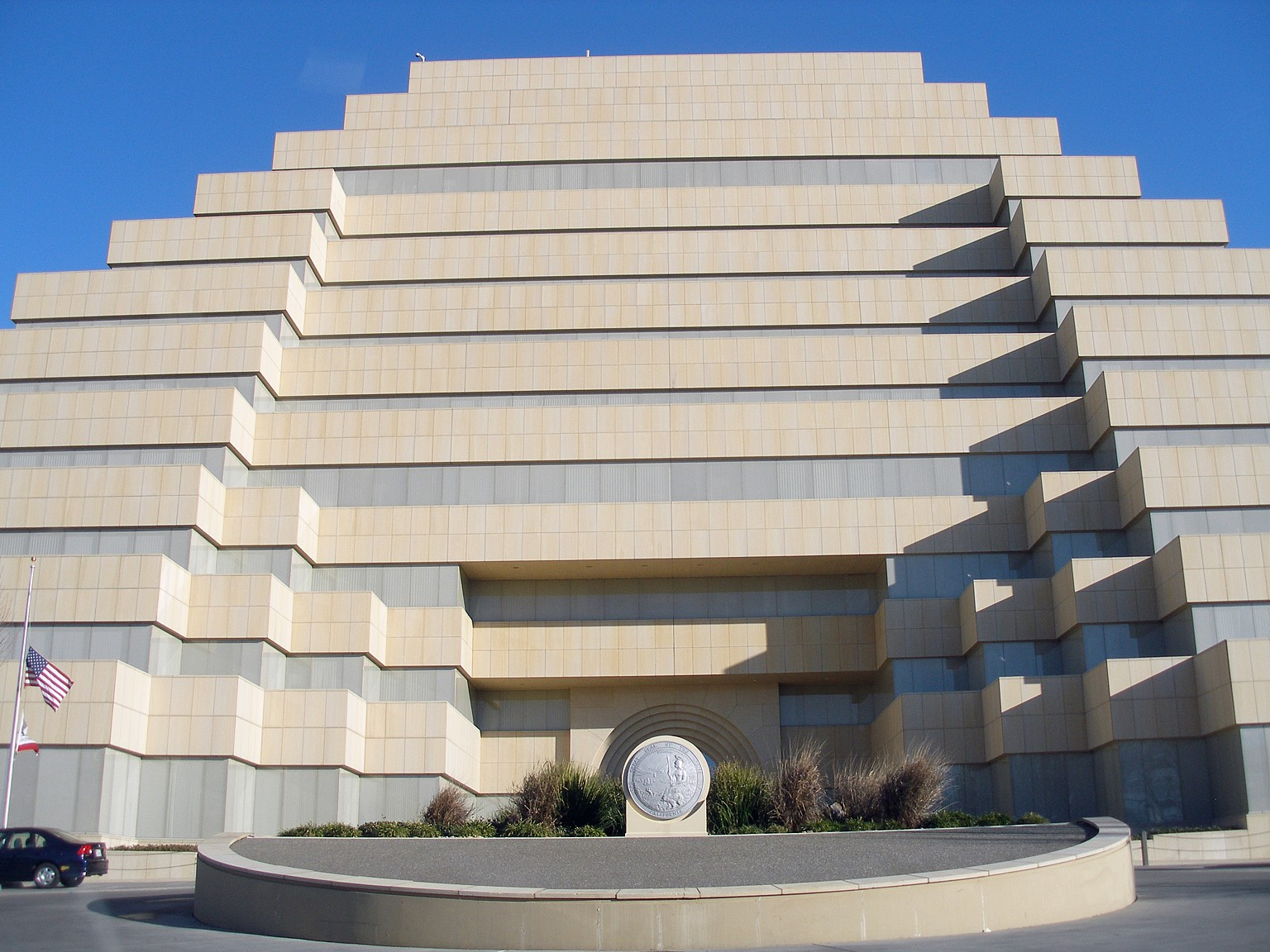
DGS headquarters located at The Ziggurat in West Sacramento

The California Department of General Services (DGS) is a state government agency in the California Government Operations Agency of the executive branch of the government of California in the United States. It provides a large number of services to other agencies in the government of California, playing a role that is similar to that played by the General Services Administration for the federal government of the United States.

In 1951, the California State Assembly's Interim Committee on Governmental Reorganization began to study a proposal to consolidate purchasing, printing, records management, traffic management, building maintenance, grounds maintenance, and information services into a single agency, to be called the Department of General Services. The purpose of this proposal was "to reduce the staggering overhead involved in the present practice of maintaining these functions separately in each State administrative agency".

This proposal was one of several long-running reform ideas floating around Sacramento since the late 1930s which were consolidated by Governor Pat Brown in 1961 into a plan for a dramatic reorganization of the state government. Brown's massive plan touched off an equally massive uproar, and he was unable to get his plan enacted all at once as a single package. That year, the California State Legislature enacted only part of the first part of Brown's plan, to create four so-called "super-agencies" (of eight then planned) headed by secretaries to reduce the number of Cabinet-level direct reports to the governor. (The hyphen was later dropped and they are now called superagencies.) In 1963, after the Little Hoover Commission filed a report recommending the creation of a Department of General Services, Governor Brown formally asked the state legislature to create such a department, and in March, Milton Marks introduced a bill to that effect in the state assembly. By June, the bill had cleared the California State Senate and went back to the assembly for a vote to concur in the senate's minor amendments to the bill, which Marks indicated would follow in due course. By September, Governor Brown had signed the bill into state law and had started to appoint officials to positions in the new department.

Since 2001, DGS headquarters has been located at The Ziggurat in West Sacramento.

== Offices and divisions ==
- Building Standards Commission
- California Commission on Disability Access
- Division of the State Architect
- Facilities Management Division
- Office of Administrative Hearings
- Office of Audit Services
- Office of Business and Acquisition Services
- Office of Fiscal Services
- Office of Fleet and Asset Management
- Office of Human Resources
- Office of Legal Services
- Office of Public School Construction
- Office of Risk and Insurance Management
- Office of State Publishing
- Office of Sustainability
- Office of Training and Administrative Standards
- Procurement Division
- Real Estate Services Division
