= The Ziggurat =

Office building in West Sacramento, California

Coordinates: 38.5829°N 121.5096°W

The Ziggurat, headquarters of the California Department of General Services

The Ziggurat is a ten-story, stepped pyramidal office building and adjacent five-story concrete parking structure located at 707 3rd Street in West Sacramento, California, on the shore of the Sacramento River. Designed by Sacramento architect Edwin Kado to resemble the ancient Mesopotamian ziggurats, the building was built by The Money Store in 1997. Since 2001 it has been leased by the California Department of General Services (DGS) as its headquarters.

Located on more than 7 acres (28,000 m^{2}) adjacent to the Tower Bridge, the unusually designed office building contains more than 373,725 square feet (35,000 m^{2}) of usable office area.

== Architecture ==
Architect Edwin Kado describes the building as follows:

"I originally designed a building that cantilevered toward the river, so it was like a pyramid upside down. It was 12 stories, and so when you got to the top floor, it was 120 feet [37 m] toward the river. When I presented it to the president of the Money Store, he thought it was interesting, but he wanted a symmetrical building... I [then] suggested this shape...because that shape connotes stability, and I thought it would be a good image for the Money Store."

== Structure and exterior ==
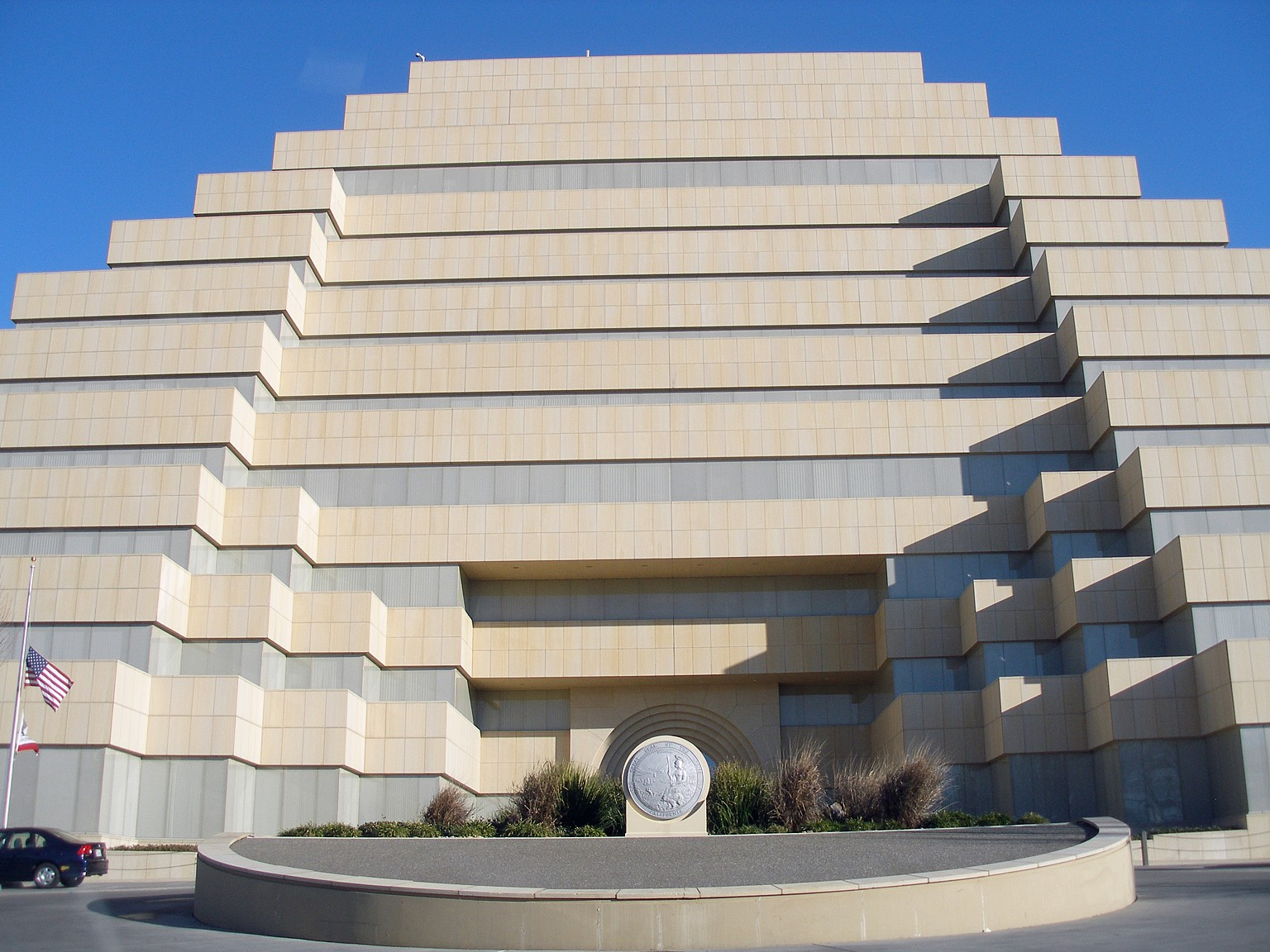
Front entrance of the Ziggurat

The structure of the building is a standard column and beam steel superstructure, set upon a pre-stressed concrete, pile foundation system. The structural steel is designed to resist a seismic event of up to 6.9 on the Richter scale, an extremely high standard for the Sacramento area. The exterior skin of the building consists of Minnesota Gray Buff limestone panels. Each panel weighs over four tons.

The building can be illuminated at night. Since the state has leased the building (since 2001), it turns these lights on only for certain events.

== Technology ==
Critical areas of the building have 75 kW emergency power back-up system and 300 kW UPS (uninterrupted power system). In addition, the building has a dual electric power feed from two separate electrical components. A centralized monitoring facility allows video security surveillance throughout the interior and exterior of the building. The communications center has a dual fiber feed from two local fiber communication companies (four separate fiber connections). In addition to dedicated telephone and computer equipment rooms on each floor, there is a 3,600-square-foot (330 m^{2}) raised floor computer room with isolated Liebert units for controlled temperature and climatic conditions on the third floor. The building has five traction elevators serving all floors, as well as an additional hydraulic elevator that provides service between the basement parking area and the first floor.

== Parking ==
The on-site parking structure contains spaces for 1,649 vehicles. There are also accommodations for secured bicycle parking. All access into and out of the structure is controlled by card key access. The first floor is enclosed by a wrought iron fence. The parking structure is cast-in-place concrete with tensioned decks. It is designed to withstand a 6.8 seismic event. Two traction elevators serve each floor.

== Amenities ==
The building contains an employee fitness center equipped with exercise equipment, showers, and locker facilities.

== See also ==
- The Chet Holifield Federal Building, another Californian "ziggurat", serves as federal offices.
