= Laguna Niguel, California =

City in California, United States

- City
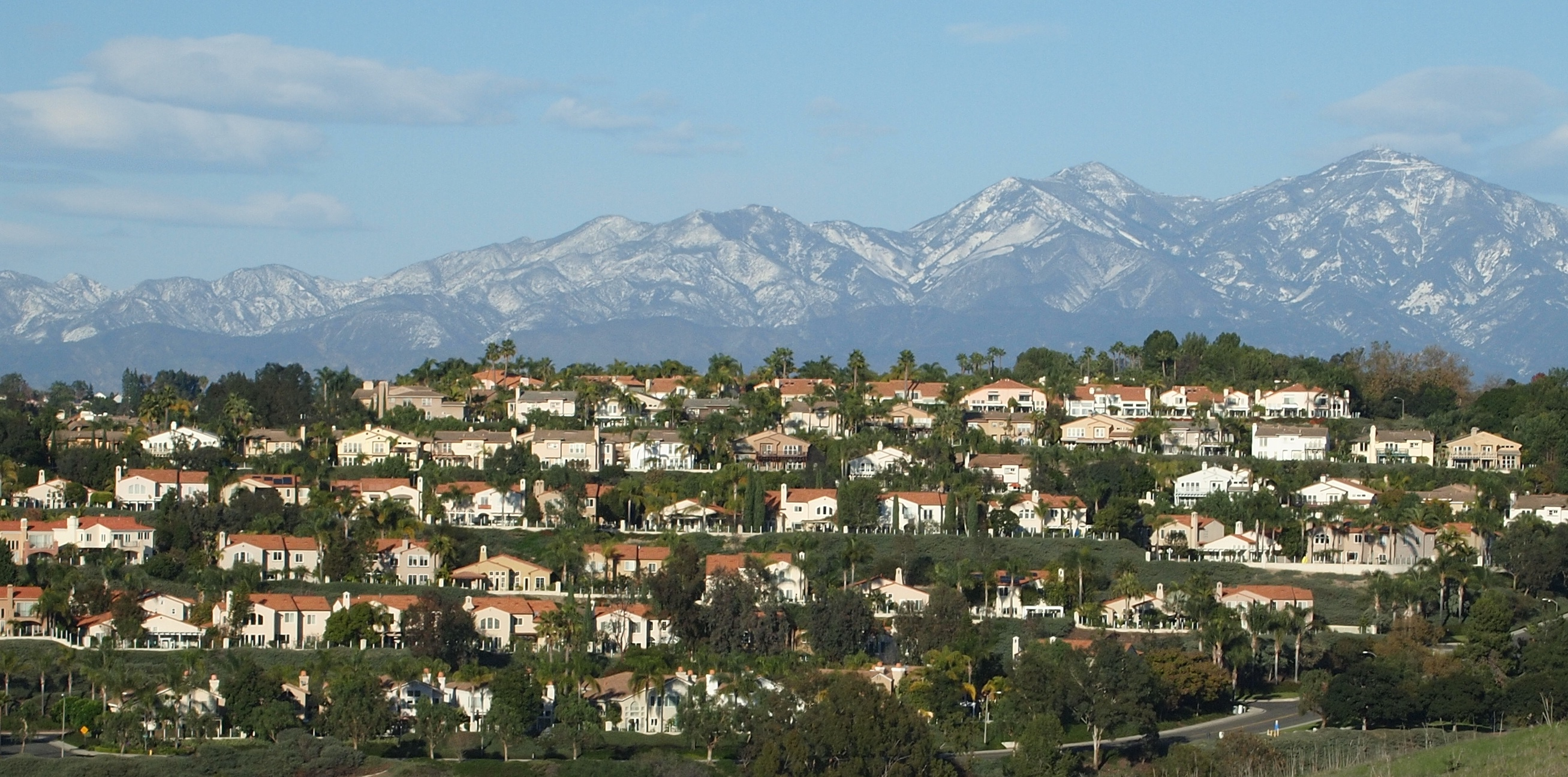
- Suburban homes in Laguna Niguel, 2004

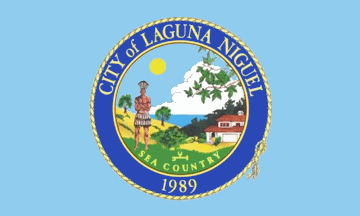
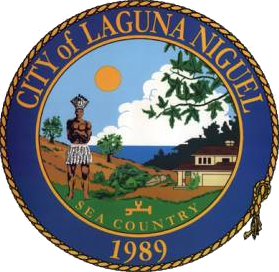
- Flag Seal
- Interactive map of Laguna Niguel, California
- Location in the United States Laguna Niguel (the United States)
- Coordinates: 33°31′55″N 117°42′9″W
- Country: United States
- State: California
- County: Orange
- Incorporated: December 1, 1989

Government
  - Type: Council-Manager
  - Mayor: Ray Gennaway
  - Mayor Pro Tem: Gene Johns
  - City Council: Kelly Jennings; Stephanie Oddo; Stephanie Winstead
  - City Manager: Tamara Letourneau
  - Deputy City Manager: Justin Martin

Area
  - Total: 14.79 sq mi (38.30 km^{2})
  - Land: 14.74 sq mi (38.17 km^{2})
  - Water: 0.050 sq mi (0.13 km^{2}) 0.35%
- Elevation: 400 ft (122 m)

Population (2020)
  - Total: 64,355
  - Density: 4,367/sq mi (1,686/km^{2})
- Time zone: UTC-8 (Pacific)
  - Summer (DST): UTC-7 (PDT)
- ZIP codes: 92607, 92677
- Area code: 949
- FIPS code: 06-39248
- GNIS feature IDs: 1660875, 2411597
- Website: cityoflagunaniguel.org

Laguna Niguel (/ləˈɡuːnə nɪˈɡɛl/ luh-GOO-nuh nih-GEL) is a city in Orange County, California, United States. The name Laguna Niguel is derived from the words "Laguna" (Spanish for "lagoon") and "Niguili" (the name of a Native American village once located near Aliso Creek). It also appeared in Spanish records as Nigüili, Nigüel, or Neuil from Juaneño (Acjachemem) nawil. As of the 2020 census, the population was 64,355. Laguna Niguel is located in the San Joaquin Hills in the southeastern corner of Orange County, close to the Pacific Ocean, and borders the cities of Aliso Viejo, Dana Point, Laguna Beach, Laguna Hills, Mission Viejo, and San Juan Capistrano.

Laguna Niguel has its origins in the Rancho Niguel Mexican land grant, which was acquired in 1959 by the Laguna Niguel Corporation to develop one of California's first master-planned communities. As a predominantly residential city, Laguna Niguel serves as a bedroom community for the job centers of northern and central Orange County. Laguna Niguel has a median household income 31 percent above the Orange County average and nearly double the U.S. average. It is known for its mild coastal climate, low crime rate, and its numerous parks and public trails.

== History ==
=== Early inhabitants and settlers ===
The first recorded inhabitants of the Laguna Niguel area were the Acjachemem Native Americans, who may have had a village called "Niguili" near the confluence of Aliso Creek and Sulphur Creek. Aliso Creek marked the boundary between the Acjachemem and Tongva people. In the 1700s, during the Spanish colonization of the Americas, Spanish missionaries established the nearby Mission San Juan Capistrano to convert the Acjachemem to Christianity. The Mission lands, which included the present-day boundaries of Laguna Niguel, were divided into private land grants in 1821 upon Mexico's independence from Spain.

In 1842, the 13,316-acre (5,389 ha) Rancho Niguel was granted to Juan Avila; he retained ownership of the land through the Mexican–American War (when California became part of the United States) until 1865, when a severe drought forced him into bankruptcy. In 1895 Lewis Moulton and Jean Pierre Daguerre bought the Rancho Niguel and other portions of the surrounding area from farmers who were struggling due to persistent drought conditions. The Moulton Company was established to oversee 19,000 acres (7,700 ha) of local land which was used, mainly for orchards and sheep ranching, well into the mid-20th century. In 1951 the land was divided between the Moulton and Daguerre families, the latter inheriting 8,056 acres (3,260 ha) in the future location of Laguna Niguel. In 1954 the Daguerres sold 7,200 acres (2,900 ha) to the Shumaker Group and

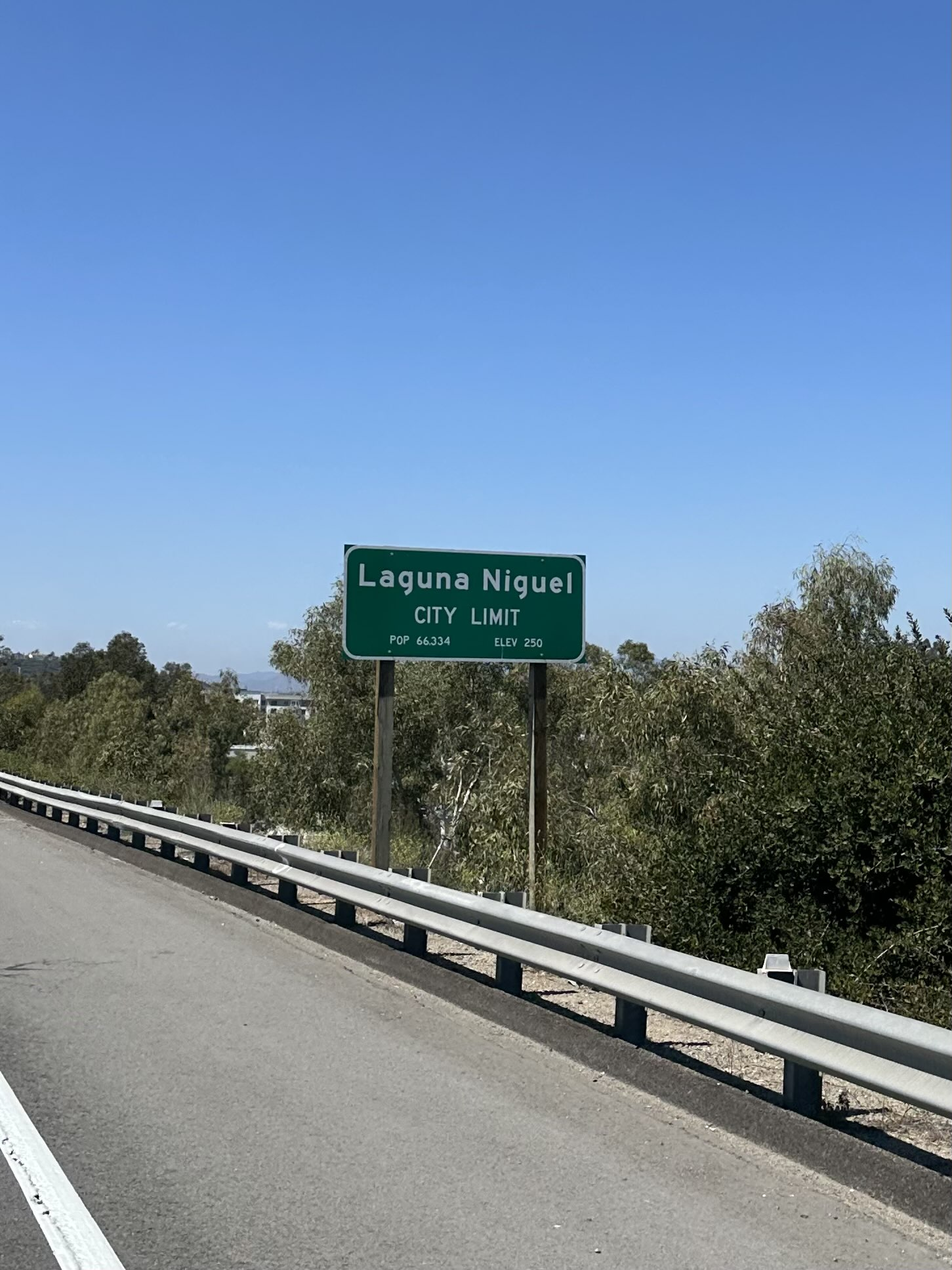
Laguna Nigel City Limit Sign

856 acres (346 ha) of oceanfront to George Capron, a former Major League Baseball player who established the Capron Ranch.

=== Laguna Niguel Corporation ===
The completion of Interstate 5 in 1959 enabled easy access to job centers in Los Angeles County, creating a boom in the Orange County housing market. In 1959, Cabot, Cabot & Forbes and Paine Webber partnered to form the Laguna Niguel Corporation, which purchased the Daguerre land to develop one of California's first master planned communities. Cabot Road and Forbes Road were named in legacy after the company. The initial 7,100-acre (2,900 ha) town plan was created by Viennese architect Victor Gruen and expanded beginning in 1971 by AVCO Community Developers after they acquired the Laguna Niguel Corporation. The name of the city was created from "Laguna", a reference to the tidal lagoon that once formed at the mouth of Aliso Creek, and the name of the Acjachemem village Niguili that once occupied the area. As the city would be developed in stages, ranchers and farmers signed annual leases with the Laguna Niguel Corporation to use the land until the planned communities were built.

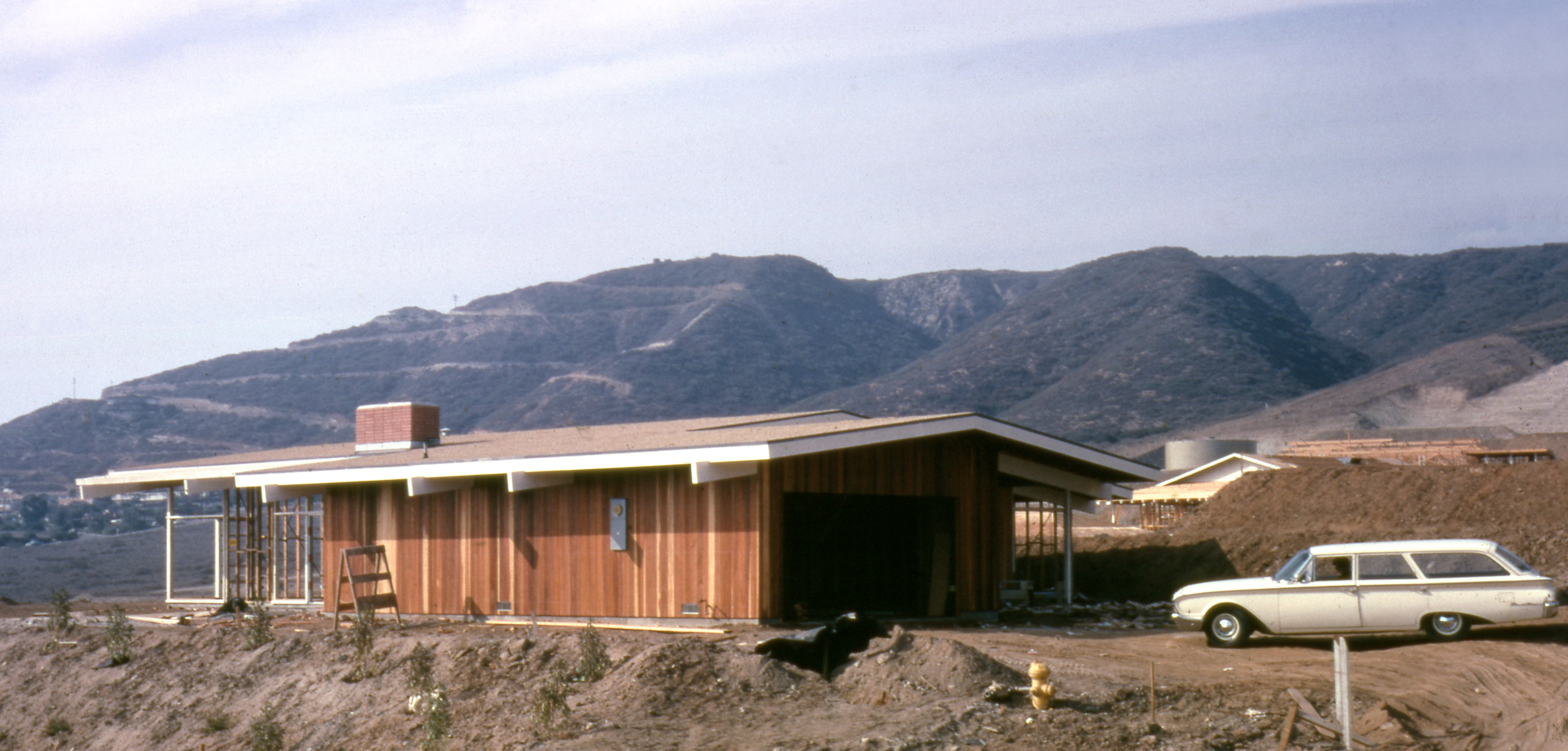
Terrace model home, Laguna Niguel, 1961

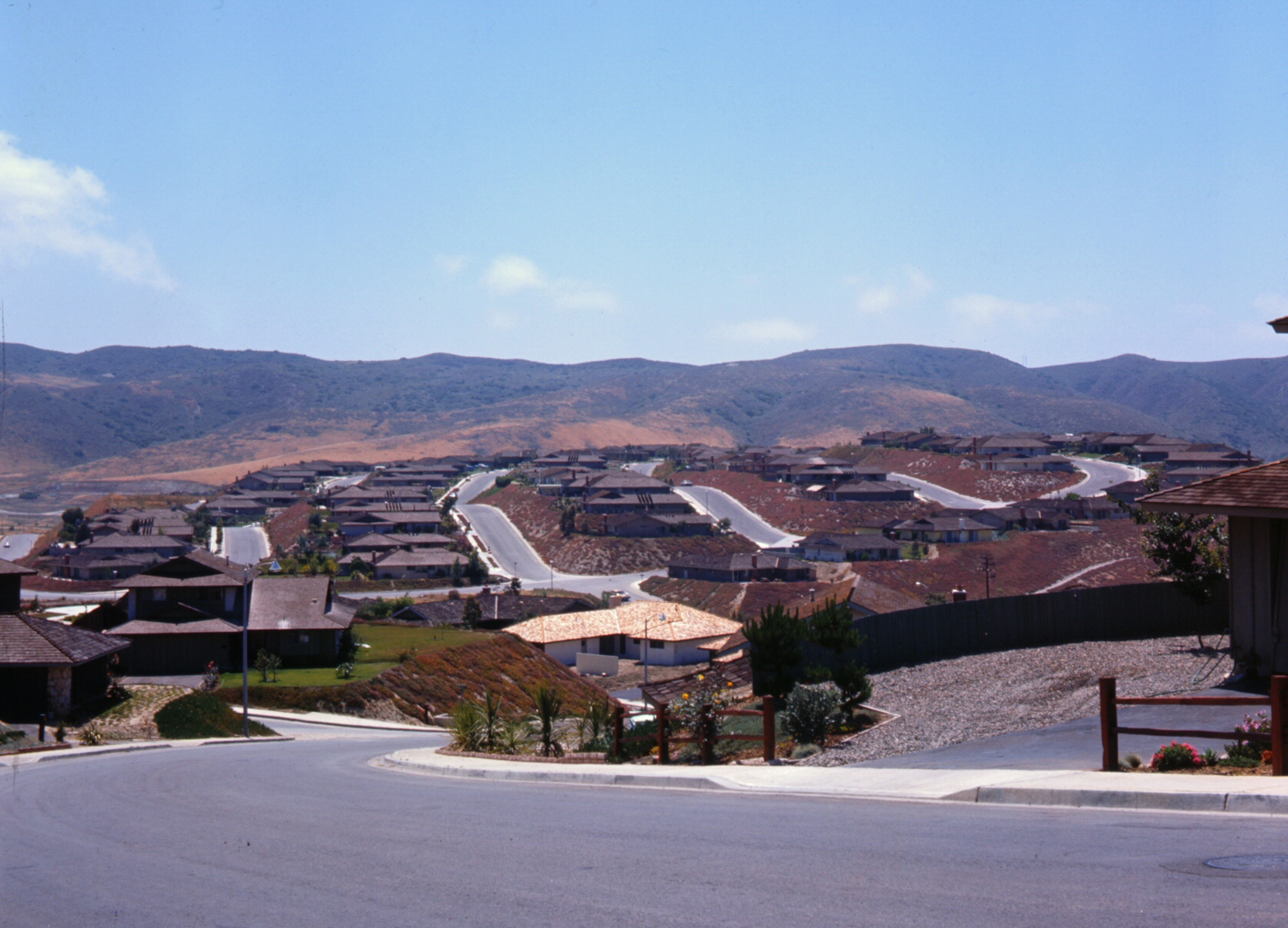
Los Serranos Drive, 1966

In contrast to a traditional bedroom community, Laguna Niguel was designed so that "families should have most of their economic needs and their social and cultural interests met by facilities within the community". The plan was also notable for its emphasis on parks and open space – comprising nearly a third of the land to be developed. The Laguna Niguel Corporation went public in April 1959 and raised an initial $8.2 million from investors. In 1962 the first tracts of Monarch Bay and Niguel Terrace were completed, consisting of 565 homes. In 1960, the Moulton Niguel Water District (which today serves all of Laguna Niguel) was established by a conglomerate of ranchers, to import water from the Colorado River Aqueduct as the area lacked a sufficient natural water supply. In 1964, Crown Valley Parkway was completed from I-5 to the Pacific Coast Highway, facilitating transport through the growing city. By 1965 the population of Laguna Niguel reached 1,000.

The Laguna Niguel Homeowner's Association was formed in 1966 as an advisory to the Orange County Board of Supervisors (which governed the unincorporated community). In 1973 Laguna Niguel Regional Park opened to the public. The Chet Holifield Federal Building (a local landmark popularly known as the "Ziggurat"), designed by William L. Pereira, was constructed for Rockwell International in 1971 and was meant to bring 7,000 jobs to the area. It was traded to the US General Services Administration in exchange for industrial facilities elsewhere.

=== Incorporation and conflict with Dana Point ===
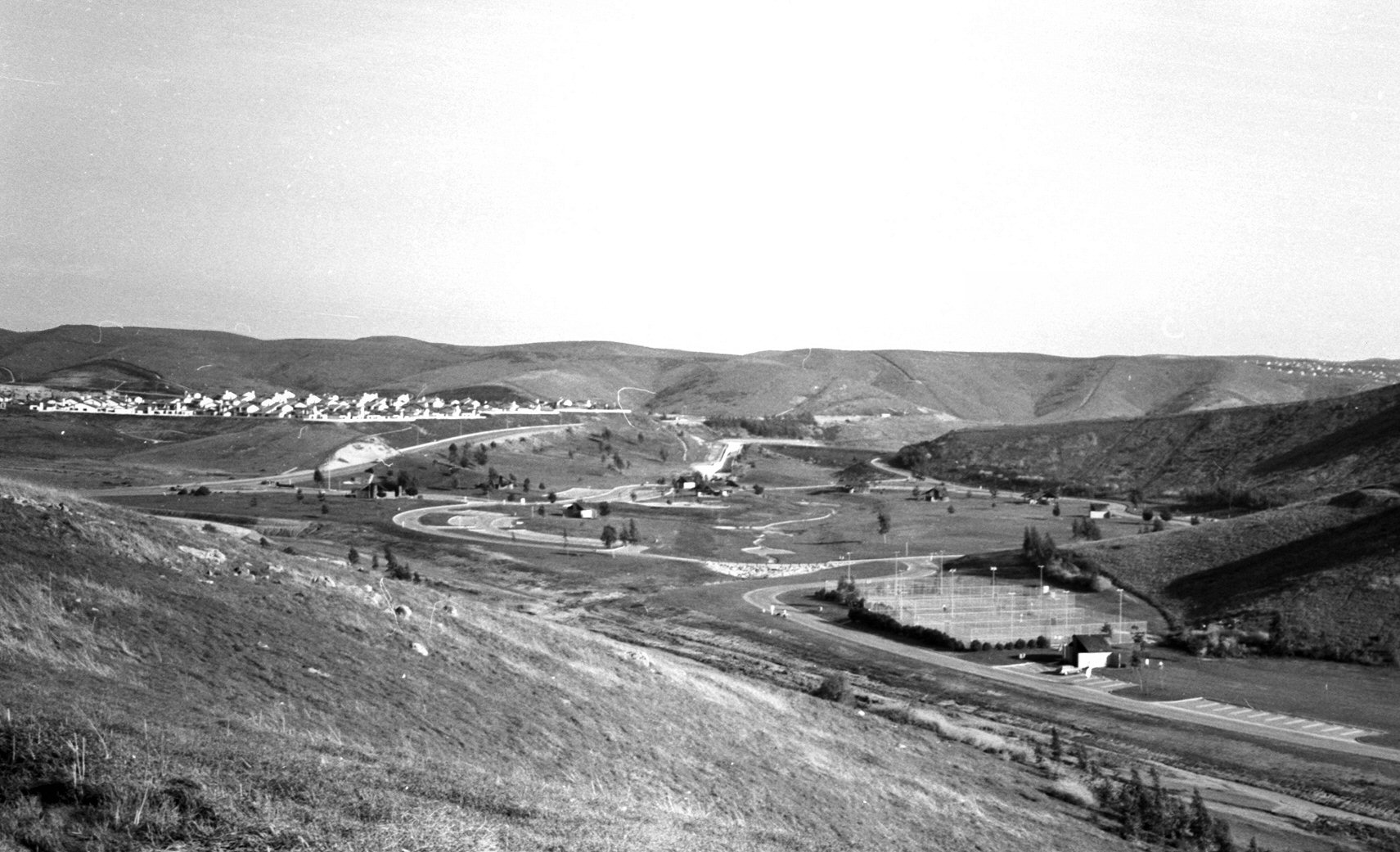
Laguna Niguel Regional Park, 1975

In 1965 the Laguna Niguel Corporation had purchased George Capron's oceanfront property and began to develop the Niguel Shores neighborhood, known in its early days as the "Coastal Strip" and today as Monarch Beach. By the 1970s, unincorporated Dana Point began expressing interest in including the Niguel Shores in a new city. In 1977 Dana Point briefly proposed incorporation with Laguna Niguel as a single city. Both cities submitted incorporation requests in December 1986, when a controversy immediately erupted over the coastal Monarch Beach community. Although Monarch Beach had been developed by the Laguna Niguel Corporation, its residents voted 61 percent in favor of joining with Dana Point. Laguna Niguel filed a lawsuit, which was ultimately turned down by a judge. Laguna Niguel was formally incorporated on December 1, 1989, without the coastal strip, as Orange County's 29th city.

=== Incorporated city ===
The population increased quickly during the last few decades of the 20th century, from 12,237 in 1980 to 61,891 in 2000. Growth since 2000 has been slower, with an estimate of 65,806 in 2015, due to the fact that the city has been fully built out. In 1992, Alicia Parkway was completed to I-5, providing a shorter route for northbound commuters; in 1996 the 73 San Joaquin Hills toll road opened, linking Laguna Niguel to the Interstate 405 in Costa Mesa. The Laguna Niguel City Hall, which had been planned as early as 1989, finally opened on October 15, 2011.

In 1994 local residents first noticed damage to retaining walls and roads near an artificial slope on Via Estoril in the Niguel Summit community, and geologists warned that the area could be subject to a landslide. After heavy rains caused by the 1997–98 Super El Niño, the hill collapsed on March 19, 1998, destroying 5 or 6 homes at the top and five condominium units at the bottom. There were no deaths as the area had been evacuated only a few hours prior to the collapse. An investigation revealed that the company responsible for development, J.M. Peters Inc., had improperly packed and graded the 275,000 tons of fill supporting the Niguel Summit homes. In addition, the project had been plagued by instability throughout its construction, and halted repeatedly "after complaints of mudslides, slope washouts, erosion and dust." The Los Angeles Times reported that "according to county records, the developers were warned that building on "ancient landslides" could be unsafe, but they were able to continue construction after producing their own geological report that persuaded county officials to let the project go forward." However the most recent disaster to the Niguel Summit Subdivision has been the coastal fire in 2022 which flattened 20 homes and damaged many more. This fire started after problems and circuit activity was reported on a Southern California Edison short distance electricity tower in Laguna Beach.

== Geography ==
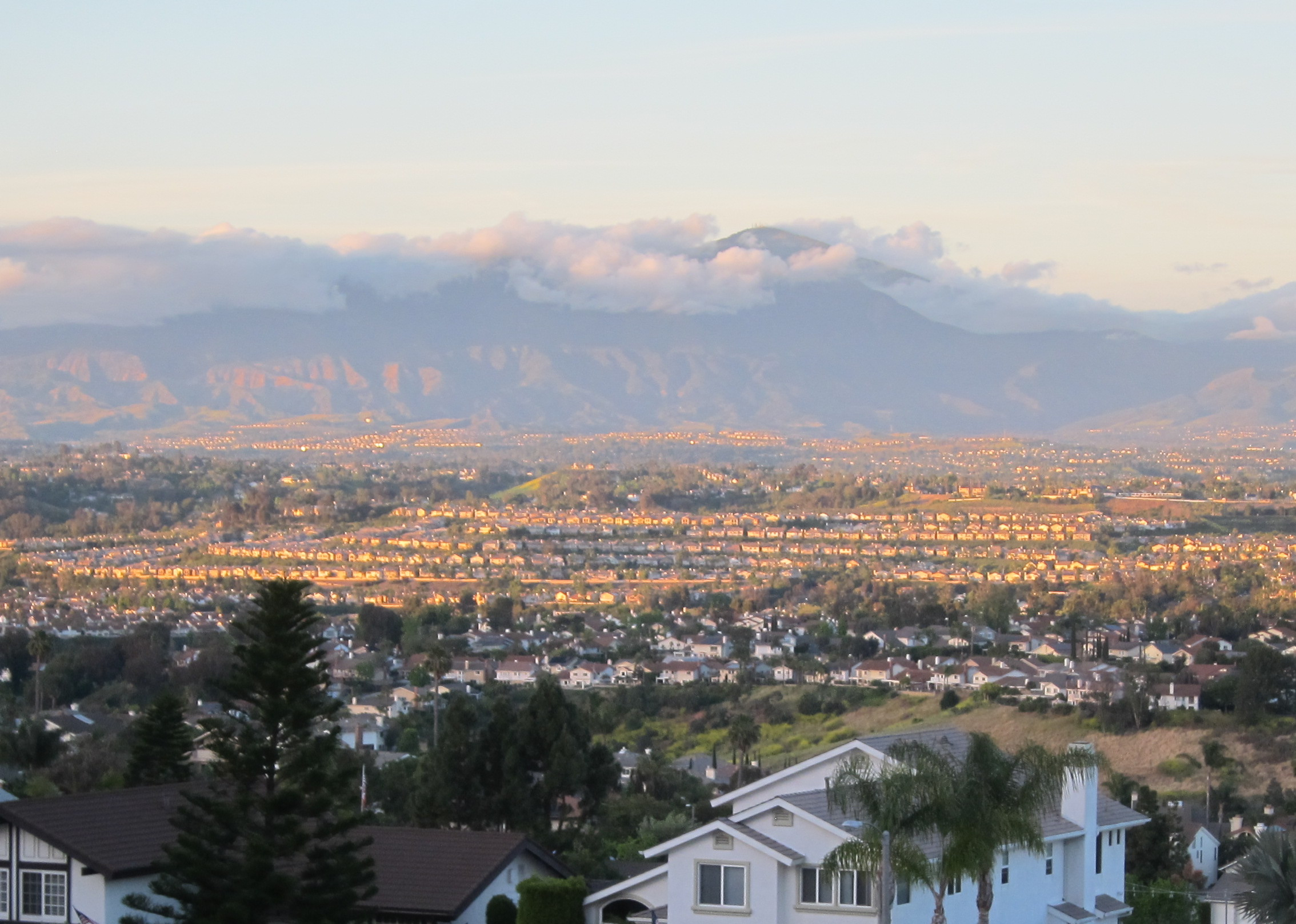
Evening view over Niguel Summit, with the San Joaquin Hills neighborhood in the distance

According to the United States Census Bureau, the city has a total area of 14.8 square miles (38 km^{2}), of which 14.7 square miles (38 km^{2}) is land and 0.05 square miles (0.13 km^{2}) (0.35%) is water.

Laguna Niguel consists of mostly hilly terrain, being located within the San Joaquin Hills. The average elevation is 400 feet (120 m); elevations range from near sea level to 936 feet (285 m) at the summit of Niguel Hill, in the southwest corner of the city. Neighboring cities are Aliso Viejo and Laguna Hills to the north, Mission Viejo and San Juan Capistrano to the east, and Laguna Beach and Dana Point to the south. On the west, it borders the significant unincorporated acreage of Aliso and Wood Canyons Wilderness Park.

The main watercourses in Laguna Niguel are Salt Creek, which flows through the southern part of the city, and Sulphur Creek, which drains much of the northern half. Sulphur Creek is a tributary of Aliso Creek, which flows through the wide and deep Aliso Canyon before reaching the Pacific Ocean. Laguna Niguel Lake, formed by damming Sulphur Creek, is the largest body of water in the city. Although Laguna Niguel is located very close to the Pacific, it does not border it, the result of a controversy over the coastline with Dana Point in 1989 (see #History).

=== Climate ===
Laguna Niguel, California

Climate chart (precipitation, max. and min. temperature)
J	F	M	A	M	J	J	A	S	O	N	D
2.9 68 44	3.4 68 45	2 69 47	0.9 72 50	0.3 73 54	0.1 75 58	0.1 79 61	0 80 60	0.3 80 59	0.7 77 54	1.1 72 48	2.4 67 43
- █ Average max. and min. temperatures in °F
- █ Precipitation totals in inches
- Source: Weather.com / NWS
Metric conversion
J	F	M	A	M	J	J	A	S	O	N	D
74 20 7	86 20 7	51 21 8	23 22 10	7.6 23 12	2.5 24 14	2.5 26 16	0 27 16	7.6 27 15	18 25 12	28 22 9	61 19 6
- █ Average max. and min. temperatures in °C
- █ Precipitation totals in mm

Like much of coastal Southern California, Laguna Niguel has pleasant weather year-round. On average, August is the hottest month and December the coolest. The highest recorded temperature was 108 °F (42 °C), which occurred in 1963, and the lowest temperature was 21 °F (−6 °C), which was recorded in 1949. Precipitation is sparse in Laguna Niguel, as only five months out of the year receive rainfall greater than one inch, with an annual average of 14.2 inches (360 mm). The highest monthly rainfall on average occurs in February and is 3.4 inches (86 mm).

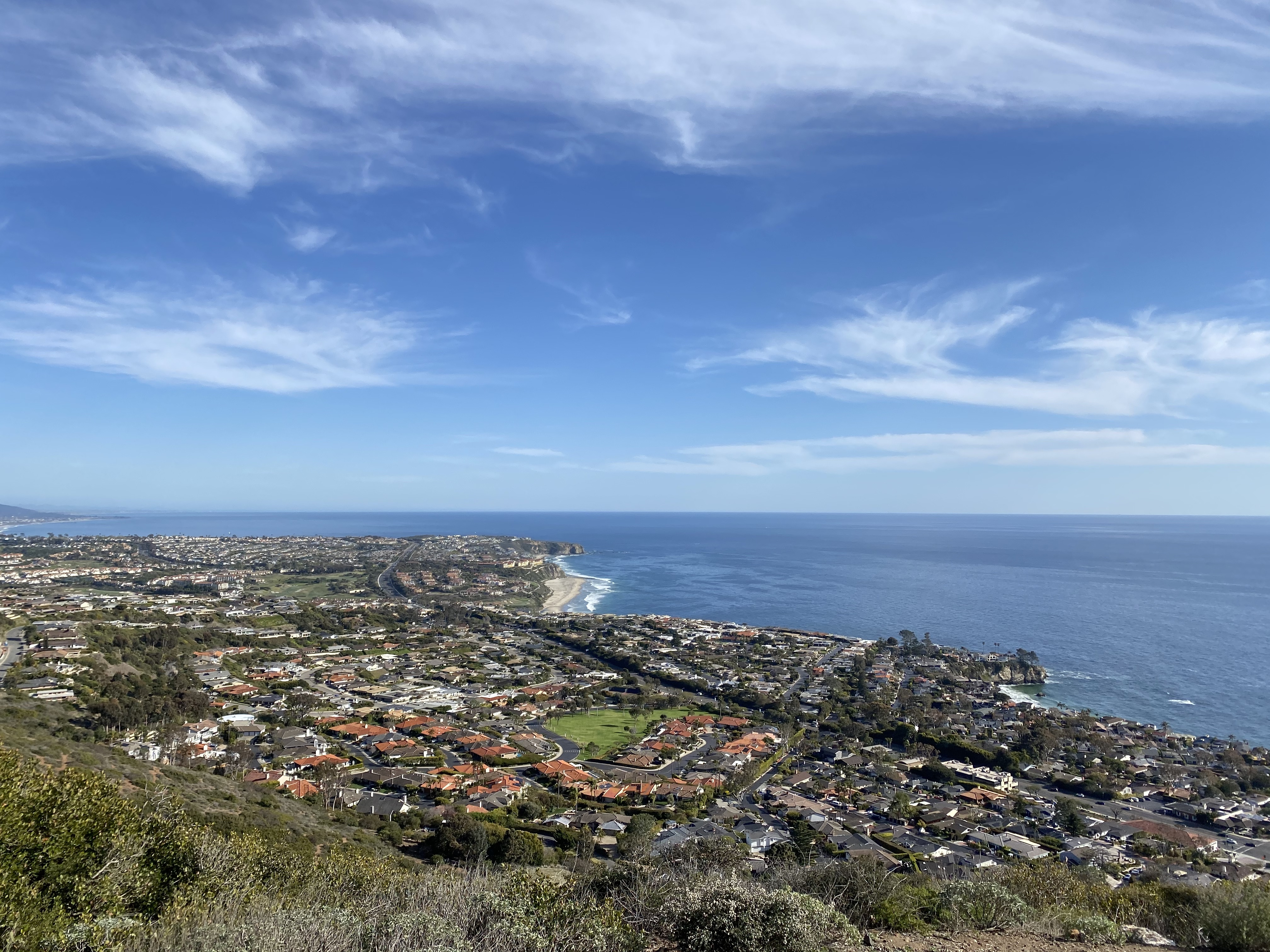
View of Laguna Beach and Dana Point from Badlands Park, Laguna Niguel. March 2021.

=== Neighborhoods ===
Neighborhoods include Bear Brand Ranch, San Marin, El Niguel Heights and Golf Course, Ocean Ranch, Laguna Crest, Laguna Sur. Coronado Pointe, South Peak, Crest de Ville, Niguel Coast, Palmilla, Beacon Hill, Monarch Point, and the Highlands, which offer city, canyon, and ocean views. Other neighborhoods include Rancho Niguel, Marina Hills, Concord Hill, Niguel West, Niguel Summit, Kite Hill, Rolling Hills, and San Joaquin Hills.

=== Roads ===
Interstate 5 travels along the eastern border of Laguna Niguel, forming the border with Mission Viejo. I-5 has two interchanges in the city: Avery Parkway and Crown Valley Parkway.

The San Joaquin Hills Transportation Corridor is a major toll road travelling through Laguna Niguel, Laguna Hills, Aliso Viejo, Newport Beach, and Irvine, respectively. The toll road, managed by the Transportation Corridor Agencies and maintained by Caltrans, starts as a toll road at Interstate 5, and becomes a freeway at Bison Avenue, and provides a toll alternative to the busy Interstate 405, terminating in Costa Mesa at said freeway.

In addition to the highways listed above, Alicia Parkway and Crown Valley Parkway are major north-south thoroughfares and the Street of the Golden Lantern/Moulton Parkway is a major east-west thoroughfare. Minor thoroughfares include Camino del Avion, Marina Hills Drive, Aliso Creek Road, Niguel Road, Cabot Road, La Paz Road, and Pacific Park Drive (Oso Parkway at the Laguna Hills-Laguna Niguel border).

== Demographics ==
Historical population
Census	Pop.	Note	%±
1970	4,644		—
1980	12,237		163.5%
1990	44,400		262.8%
2000	61,891		39.4%
2010	62,979		1.8%
2020	64,355		2.2%
U.S. Decennial Census; 1860–1870 1880–1890; 1900 1910 1920; 1930 1940 1950; 1960 1970 1980; 1990 2000 2010; 2020

Laguna Niguel was first listed as a city in the 1970 U.S. census. Prior to that, the area was part of unincorporated San Juan Township.

=== Racial and ethnic composition ===
Laguna Niguel city, California – Racial and ethnic composition Note: the US Census treats Hispanic/Latino as an ethnic category. This table excludes Latinos from the racial categories and assigns them to a separate category. Hispanics/Latinos may be of any race.
Race / Ethnicity (NH = Non-Hispanic)	Pop 1980	Pop 1990	Pop 2000	Pop 2010	Pop 2020	% 1980	% 1990	% 2000	% 2010	% 2020
White alone (NH)	11,452	36,886	47,916	45,682	42,824	93.59%	83.08%	77.42%	72.54%	66.54%
Black or African American alone (NH)	25	564	723	693	766	0.20%	1.27%	1.17%	1.10%	1.19%
Native American or Alaska Native alone (NH)	26	102	110	115	115	0.21%	0.23%	0.18%	0.18%	0.18%
Asian alone (NH)	223	3,360	4,764	5,390	6,306	1.82%	7.57%	7.70%	8.56%	9.80%
Native Hawaiian or Pacific Islander alone (NH)	223	3,360	62	79	67	1.82%	7.57%	0.10%	0.13%	0.10%
Other race alone (NH)	6	37	133	118	344	0.05%	0.08%	0.21%	0.19%	0.53%
Mixed race or Multiracial (NH)	x	x	1,758	2,141	3,423	x	x	2.84%	3.40%	5.32%
Hispanic or Latino (any race)	505	3,451	6,425	8,761	10,510	4.13%	7.77%	10.38%	13.91%	16.33%
Total	12,237	44,400	61,891	62,979	64,355	100.00%	100.00%	100.00%	100.00%	100.00%

=== 2020 census ===
As of the 2020 census, Laguna Niguel had a population of 64,355. The population density was 4,367.2 inhabitants per square mile (1,686.2/km^{2}). The median age was 47.0 years. The age distribution was 18.2% under the age of 18, 8.0% aged 18 to 24, 21.5% aged 25 to 44, 31.1% aged 45 to 64, and 21.1% who were 65 years of age or older. For every 100 females, there were 94.0 males, and for every 100 females age 18 and over there were 90.8 males age 18 and over.

The census reported that 99.6% of the population lived in households, 0.4% lived in non-institutionalized group quarters, and 0.1% were institutionalized. There were 25,425 households, of which 27.0% had children under the age of 18. Of all households, 55.7% were married-couple households, 5.2% were cohabiting-couple households, 14.1% had a male householder with no spouse or partner present, and 24.9% had a female householder with no spouse or partner present. About 23.0% of households were made up of individuals, and 10.6% had someone living alone who was 65 years of age or older. The average household size was 2.52, and there were 17,952 families (70.6% of all households).

There were 27,281 housing units, of which 6.8% were vacant. The average density was 1,851.3 units per square mile (714.8 units/km^{2}). Of occupied housing units, 67.1% were owner-occupied and 32.9% were occupied by renters. The homeowner vacancy rate was 0.8%, and the rental vacancy rate was 11.9%.

100.0% of residents lived in urban areas, while 0.0% lived in rural areas.

=== 2023 estimate ===
In 2023, the US Census Bureau estimated that the median household income was $140,605, and the per capita income was $77,246. About 3.5% of families and 5.9% of the population were below the poverty line.

=== 2010 census ===
The 2010 United States census reported that Laguna Niguel had a population of 62,979. The population density was 4,231.1 inhabitants per square mile (1,633.6/km^{2}). The racial makeup of Laguna Niguel was 50,625 (80.4%) White (72.5% Non-Hispanic White), 777 (1.2%) African American, 219 (0.3%) Native American, 5,459 (8.7%) Asian, 87 (0.1%) Pacific Islander, 3,019 (4.8%) from other races, and 2,793 (4.4%) from two or more races. Hispanic or Latino of any race were 8,761 persons (13.9%).

The Census reported that 62,731 people (99.6% of the population) lived in households, 248 (0.4%) lived in non-institutionalized group quarters, and 0 (0%) were institutionalized.

There were 24,232 households, out of which 8,085 (33.4%) had children under the age of 18 living in them, 14,077 (58.1%) were opposite-sex married couples living together, 2,271 (9.4%) had a female householder with no husband present, 886 (3.7%) had a male householder with no wife present. There were 994 (4.1%) unmarried opposite-sex partnerships, and 237 (1.0%) same-sex married couples or partnerships; 5,390 households (22.2%) were made up of individuals, and 1,790 (7.4%) had someone living alone who was 65 years of age or older. The average household size was 2.59. There were 17,234 families (71.1% of all households); the average family size was 3.06.

The population was spread out, with 14,216 people (22.6%) under the age of 18, 4,722 people (7.5%) aged 18 to 24, 14,667 people (23.3%) aged 25 to 44, 21,177 people (33.6%) aged 45 to 64, and 8,197 people (13.0%) who were 65 years of age or older. The median age was 42.8 years. For every 100 females, there were 94.0 males. For every 100 females age 18 and over, there were 91.2 males.

There were 25,312 housing units at an average density of 1,700.5 per square mile (656.6/km^{2}), of which 17,453 (72.0%) were owner-occupied, and 6,779 (28.0%) were occupied by renters. The homeowner vacancy rate was 0.9%; the rental vacancy rate was 5.4%. 45,029 people (71.5% of the population) lived in owner-occupied housing units and 17,702 people (28.1%) lived in rental housing units.

=== 2009–2013 estimate ===
During 2009–2013, Laguna Niguel had a median household income of $99,771, with 6.3% of the population living below the federal poverty line.

== Government and politics ==
Laguna Niguel city vote by party in presidential elections
Year	Democratic	Republican	Third Parties
2024	48.47% 17,905	48.45% 17,898	3.08% 1,139
2020	51.41% 20,469	46.71% 18,596	1.88% 749
2016	46.11% 14,954	47.83% 15,511	6.06% 1,967
2012	40.39% 12,832	57.67% 18,321	1.94% 615
2008	46.13% 15,076	52.03% 17,002	1.84% 602
2004	37.83% 11,701	61.23% 18,937	0.94% 290
2000	36.54% 10,232	60.06% 16,820	3.40% 951
1996	33.45% 8,220	56.91% 13,984	9.64% 2,368
1992	28.91% 7,416	45.01% 11,547	26.08% 6,689

The City Council consists of five members, elected from the city at-large, who serve staggered four-year terms. Annually, the City Council appoints a Mayor and a Mayor Pro Tempore from its own membership to serve a one-year term. The City Council currently consists of:

- Ray Gennawey (Mayor)
- Gene Johns (Mayor Pro Tempore)
- Kelly Jennings (Council Member)
- Stephanie Winstead (Council Member)
- Stephanie Oddo (Council Member)

The City Hall is located at 30111 Crown Valley Parkway.

=== County, state and federal ===
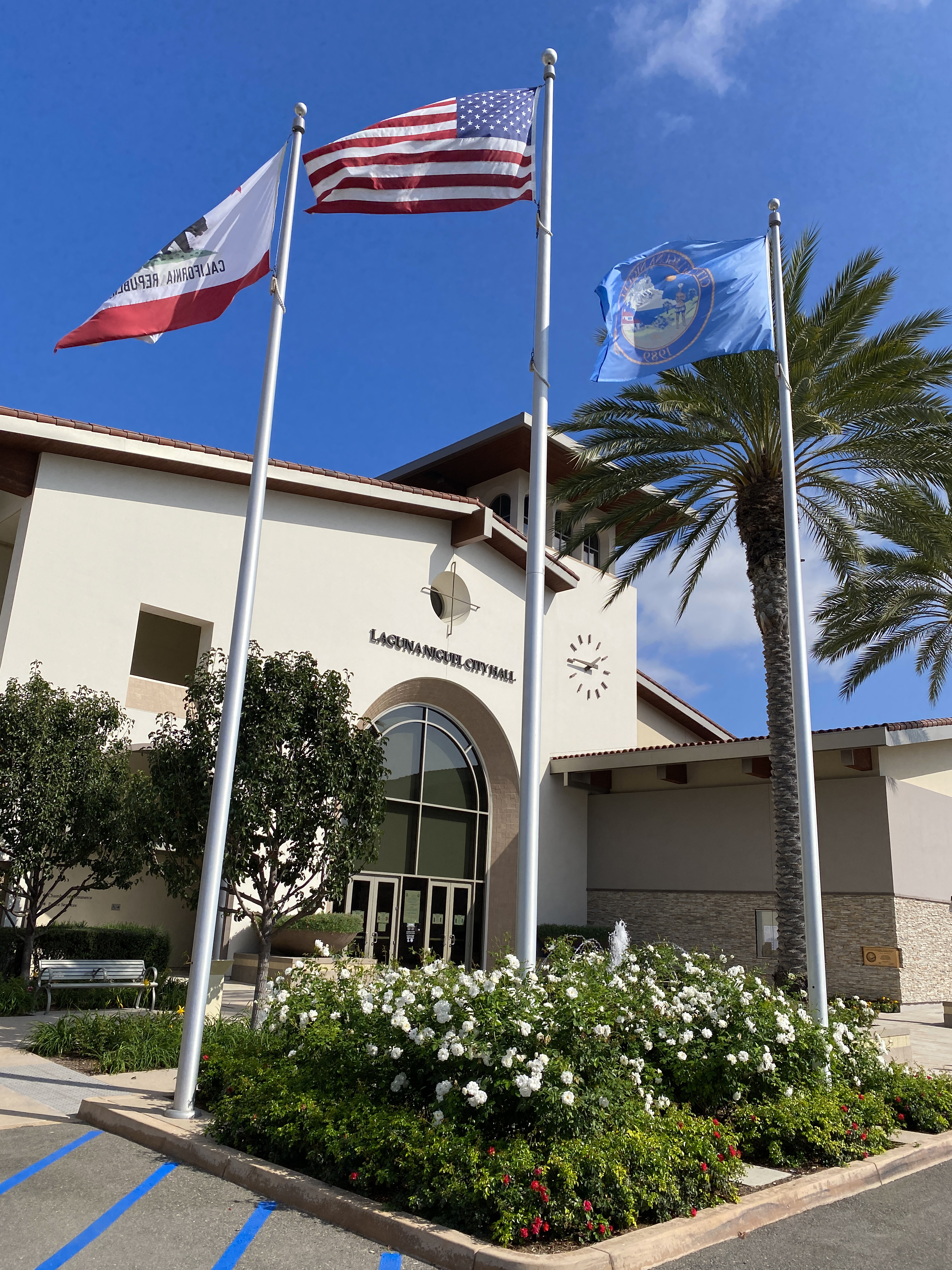
Laguna Niguel City Hall

In the Orange County Board of Supervisors Laguna Niguel is part of the 5th District and represented by Supervisor Katrina Foley.

In the California State Legislature, Laguna Niguel is in the 37th senatorial district, represented by Republican Steven Choi, and in the 74th Assembly district, represented by Republican Laurie Davies.

In the United States House of Representatives, Laguna Niguel is in California's 49th congressional district, represented by Democrat Mike Levin.

According to the Orange County Registrar of Voters, as of May 15, 2025, Laguna Niguel has 46,125 registered voters. Of those, 16,071 (39.72%) are registered Republicans, 11,615 (28.71%) are registered Democrats, and 10,843 (26.80%) have no political party preference/are independents.

Laguna Niguel is historically a Republican stronghold in presidential elections. In 2020, however, Joe Biden became the first Democratic presidential nominee to win the city since its incorporation.

=== Crime ===
The Uniform Crime Report (UCR), collected annually by the FBI, compiles police statistics from local and state law enforcement agencies across the nation. The UCR records Part I and Part II crimes. Part I crimes become known to law enforcement and are considered the most serious crimes including homicide, rape, robbery, aggravated assault, burglary, larceny, motor vehicle theft, and arson. Part II crimes only include arrest data. The 2023 UCR Data for Laguna Niguel is listed below:

2023 UCR Data
	Aggravated Assault	Homicide	Rape	Robbery	Burglary	Larceny Theft	Motor Vehicle Theft	Arson
Laguna Niguel	40	0	1	25	82	462	81	2

== Economy ==
As a bedroom community, most residents commute outside of Laguna Niguel to central and north Orange County cities, such as Irvine and Newport Beach. Most jobs within Laguna Niguel are in the service industry. According to the city's 2022 Annual Comprehensive Financial Report, the top employers in the city are:

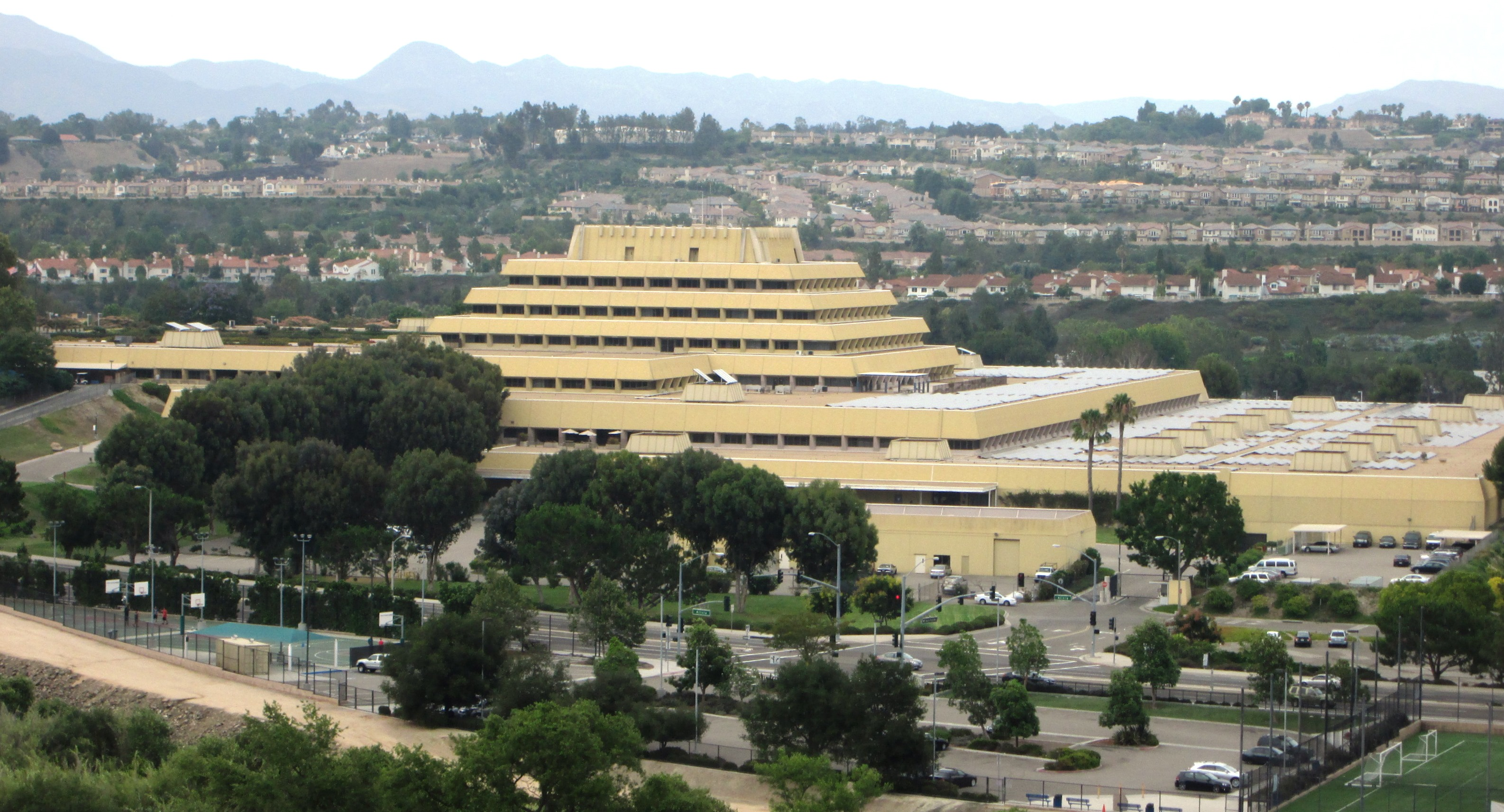
The Chet Holifield Federal Building at the border of Laguna Niguel and Aliso Viejo

#	Employer	# of employees
1	United States Government	2,000
2	Costco	595
3	Capistrano Unified School District	337
4	Walmart	301
5	Lifetime Fitness	282
6	Whole Foods Market	256
7	Mercedes-Benz of Laguna Niguel	210
8	The Home Depot	186
9	Albertsons	154
10	Vons	141

== Education ==
The city is served by the Capistrano Unified School District.

Elementary schools

- Moulton Elementary School
- Marian Bergeson Elementary
- Crown Valley Elementary School
- Hidden Hills Elementary School
- Laguna Niguel Elementary School
- John S. Malcom Elementary School
- George White Elementary School
- Orange County Academy of Sciences and Arts (K-8)

Middle schools

- Niguel Hills Middle School
- Aliso Viejo Middle School (in Aliso Viejo)
- Orange County Academy of Sciences and Arts (K-8)

High schools

- Aliso Niguel High School (in Aliso Viejo)
- Dana Hills High School (in Dana Point)

Colleges

- Saddleback College (in Mission Viejo – Served by the South Orange County Community College District)
- Chapman University (in Orange)
- Soka University of America (in Aliso Viejo)
- University of California, Irvine (in Irvine)
- California State University, Fullerton (in Irvine)
- California State University, Fullerton (in Fullerton)
- Southern California Institute of Technology, SCIT (in Anaheim)
- Pepperdine University (in Irvine)

Private schools

- St. Anne School

== Infrastructure ==
=== Emergency services ===
Laguna Niguel is protected by Orange County Fire Authority with ambulance services provided by Care Ambulance Service. Police services are provided by Orange County Sheriff. Although there are no hospitals in Laguna Niguel proper, nearby hospitals include Mission Hospital, Saddleback Memorial Hospital and South Coast Medical Center.

=== Utilities ===
Electricity in Laguna Niguel is provided by Southern California Edison and San Diego Gas & Electric. Water is provided by the Moulton Niguel Water District, which is supplied by the Metropolitan Water District of Southern California's Colorado River Aqueduct and the State Water Project. Gas is supplied by San Diego Gas & Electric and The Gas Company. Waste management is provided by CR&R (Solag Disposal).

== Transportation ==
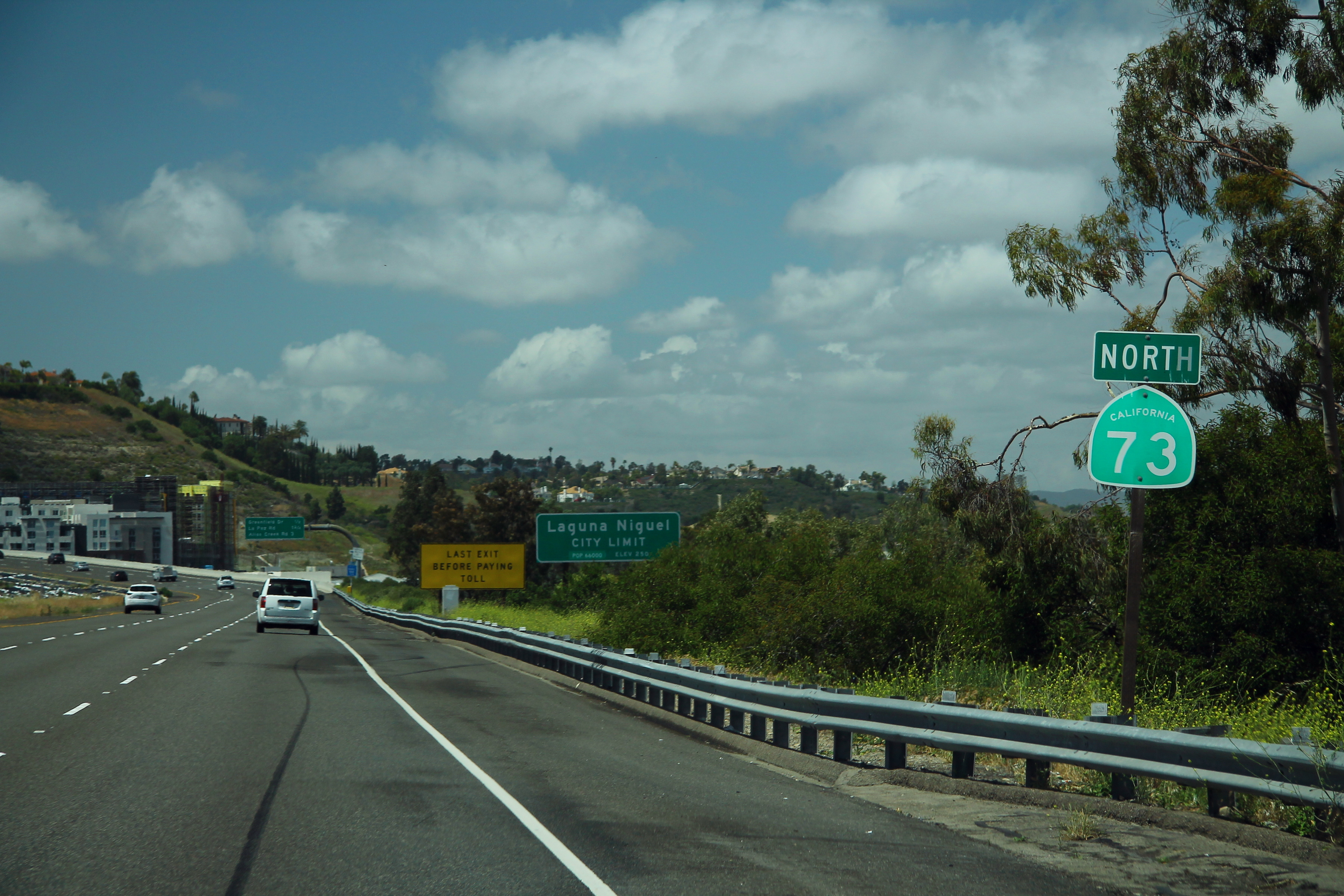
California State Route 73 entering Laguna Niguel

=== Roads ===
Laguna Niguel is served by Interstate 5 on the northeastern border, and the State Route 73 toll road which runs along the northern border. The Pacific Coast Highway (PCH) is located just outside the southern boundary of the city. Within the city, neighborhoods are connected by a network of four- to six-lane arterial roadways with timed intersections. The main thoroughfare is Crown Valley Parkway, which bisects Laguna Niguel roughly from southwest to northeast, linking the PCH in Dana Point to I-5 in Mission Viejo. The other main roads are Alicia Parkway, Niguel Road, La Paz Road, and Moulton Parkway/Golden Lantern (north-south), and Aliso Creek Road, Marina Hills Drive, and Camino del Avion (east-west). Due to the hilly local geography, Laguna Niguel's streets are not arranged in a grid pattern.

=== Buses ===
The Orange County Transportation Authority (OCTA) operates the 85, 87, 90, 91, 187 and 490 bus routes in Laguna Niguel. The 490 bus line provides connecting service to the Metrolink train station.

=== Rail ===
The Laguna Niguel/Mission Viejo station near I-5 is served by the Orange County Line and Inland Empire–Orange County Line of Metrolink commuter rail, providing service to points in Los Angeles, Riverside, San Bernardino and San Diego Counties. The Amtrak Pacific Surfliner served Laguna Niguel from 2007 to 2012, but has since ceased to stop here. Amtrak continues to serve the nearby Irvine and San Juan Capistrano stations.

=== Bicycling ===
Most major arterial roads in Laguna Niguel are marked with bike lanes. There are about 60 miles (97 km) of such lanes in the city. There are also several dedicated bikeways which link Laguna Niguel's extensive public park system (see #Parks and open space).

== Parks and open space ==
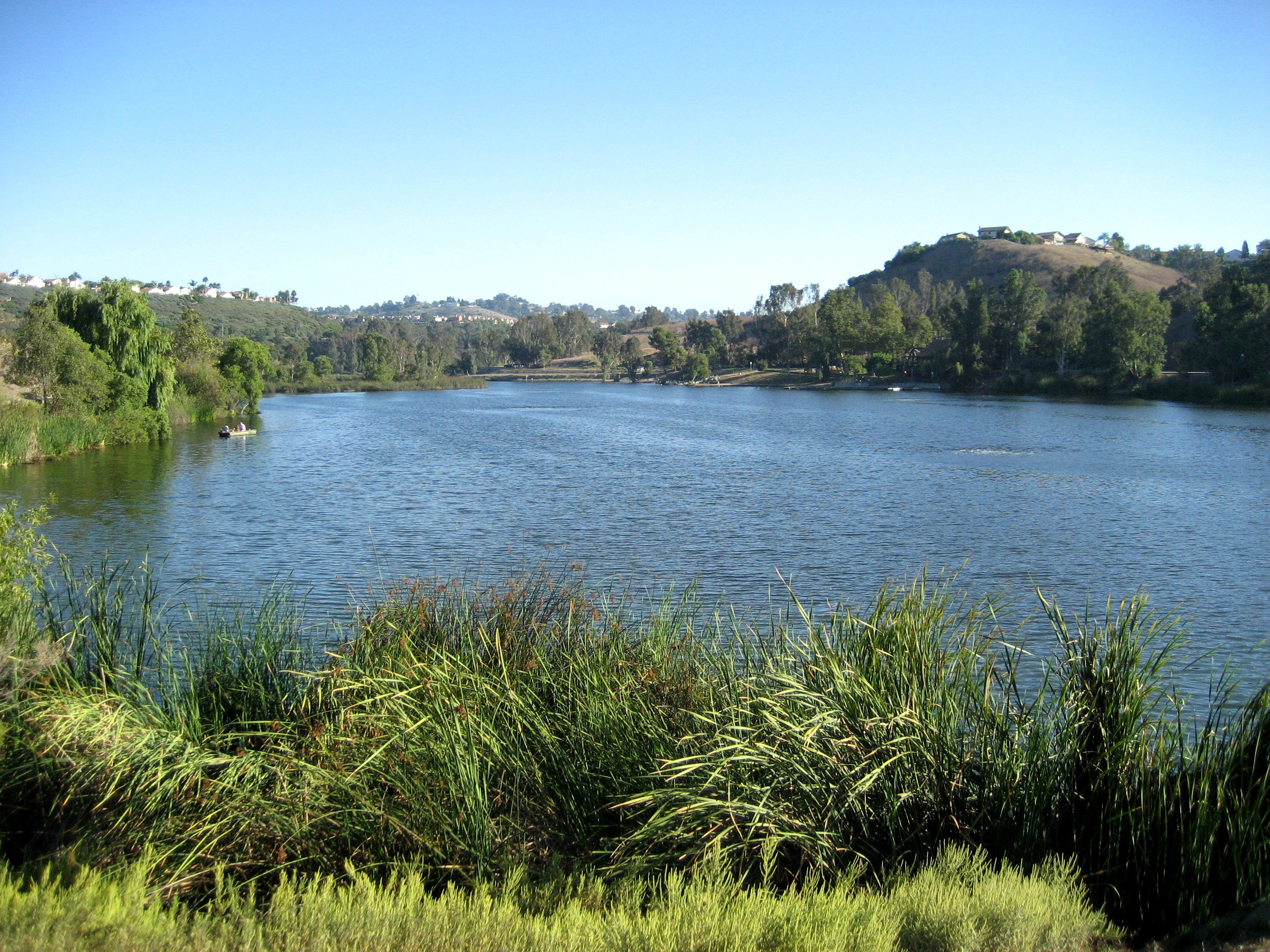
Laguna Niguel Lake in Laguna Niguel Regional Park

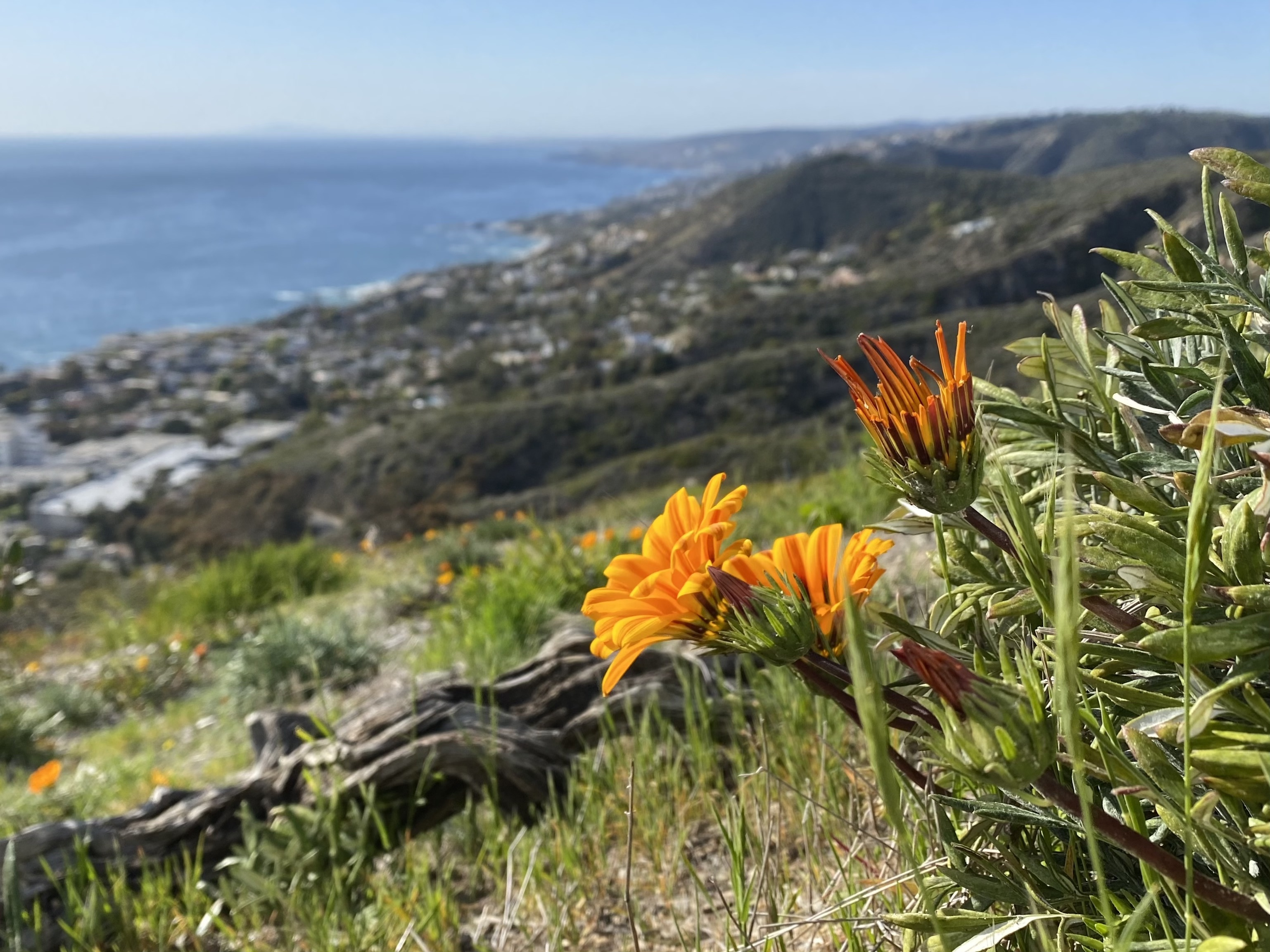
Wildflowers along Badlands Park Trail

Laguna Niguel is known throughout Orange County for its extensive park and trail system. Over one-third of Laguna Niguel is public open space, a legacy of the original 1959 Gruen plan, and is divided between 31 city parks and 4 county parks. Laguna Niguel's major roads are designated as "scenic highways" within landscape corridors, which includes parks, decorative medians, and grade-separated recreational paths. The 227-acre (92 ha) Laguna Niguel Regional Park is centrally located and includes an extensive trail network, ball courts and Laguna Niguel Lake, a popular fishing and boating venue. Crown Valley Park, visited by about 240,000 people per year, has the city's main public sports facilities. Aliso and Wood Canyons Wilderness Park, which borders Laguna Niguel on the west, consists of over 4,000 acres (1,600 ha) of canyons, grasslands and riparian forests along Aliso Creek. Aliso and Wood Canyons is part of the larger South Coast Wilderness, 22,000 acres (8,900 ha) of preserved open space in the San Joaquin Hills that also includes the larger Laguna Coast Wilderness Park and Crystal Cove State Park outside the city limits. The interconnected city and regional park systems provide a significant refuge for wildlife in an area of Orange County otherwise filled with suburban sprawl.

There are about 80 miles (130 km) of non-motorized trails in Laguna Niguel for hiking, biking and horseback riding. Major hiking trails include the Aliso Summit trail, which hugs the rim of Aliso Canyon on the western edge of Laguna Niguel, and the Colinas Bluff Trail on the eastern border, overlooking San Juan Capistrano. The Laguna Ridge Trail passes through Badlands County Park, which exposes the namesake geological formations, and approaches the summit of Niguel Hill, the highest point in the city. The paved Salt Creek Trail, a popular Class I bikeway, follows Salt Creek and Niguel Road from Dana Point to Laguna Niguel Regional Park. The Aliso Creek and Oso Creek trails are mostly outside Laguna Niguel, but link the city via greenbelts to other parts of south Orange County. The Aliso Creek Trail is also known as the "Forest to the Sea Trail", as it is planned to connect the Santa Ana Mountains in the Cleveland National Forest to the Pacific Ocean at Laguna Beach.

== Notable people ==
- Josh Allen, quarterback for the Buffalo Bills
- Erik Apple, mixed martial arts fighter
- Gavyn Bailey, singer-songwriter
- Patricia Bates, member of the California State Senate
- Julie Doyle, soccer player
- Daniel L. Fapp, cinematographer
- McKayla Maroney, 2012 Summer Olympics medalist
- Cady McClain, actress, singer and author
- Frank Rosenthal, professional gambler, former casino boss, and reputed Chicago Outfit associate
- Mimi Walters, member of the U.S. House of Representatives
- Rachel Wood, soccer player

== Sister cities ==
- Al-Qa'im, Iraq, since January 2008

== See also ==
- 1972 United California Bank burglary
