= Ernest Feysplein =

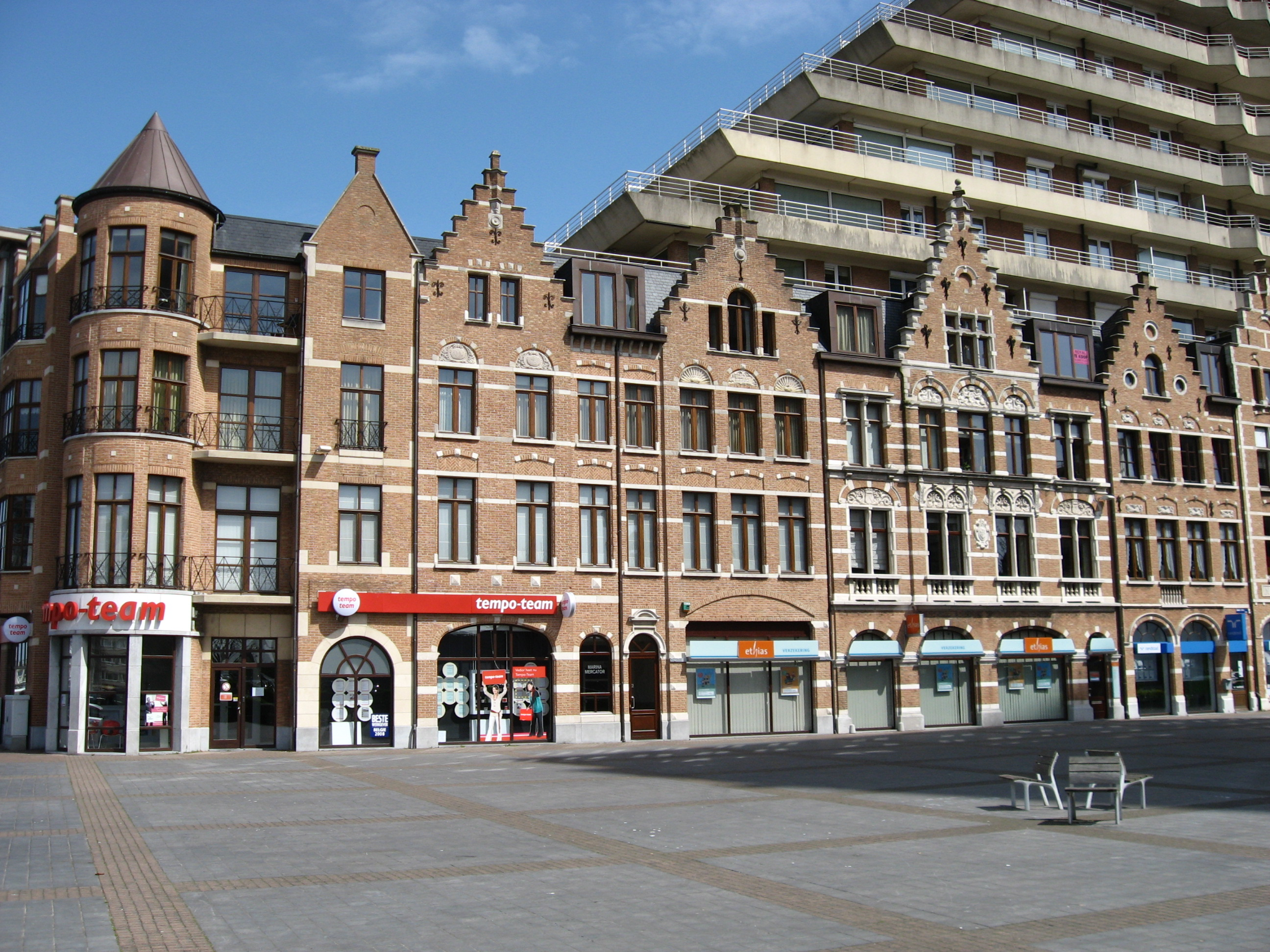
The Ernest Feysplein building in Ostend. Note the fusion of the old and new architectural aesthetics.

The Ernest Feysplein is one of two ziggurat style buildings in Ostend. It is built on the former site of the Oostende-Stad train station. The aesthetics of the Ernest Feysplein notably retains the facia of the previous buildings fusing old and modern architectural styles.
