= Aliso Viejo, California =

City in California, United States

- City
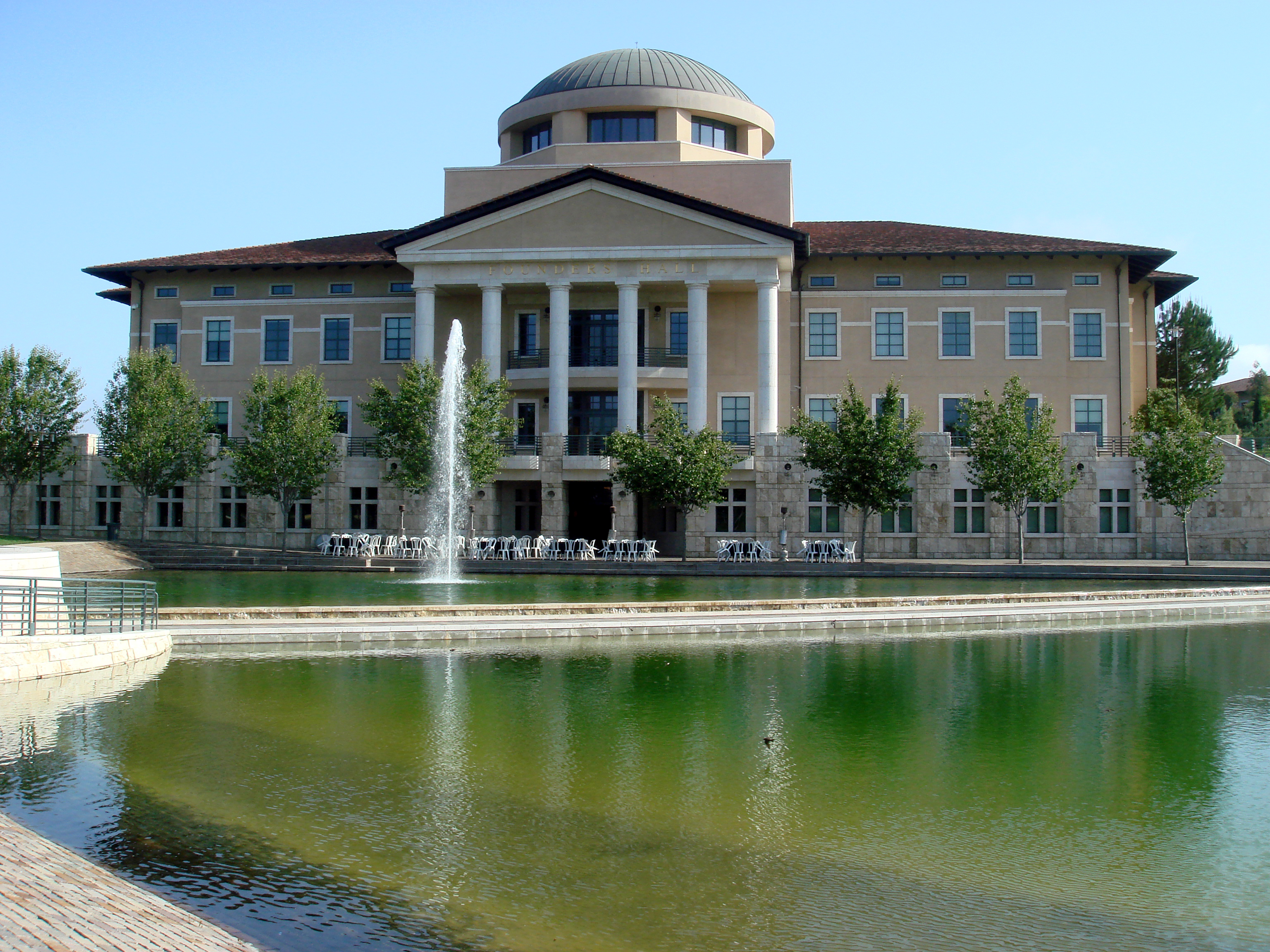
- Soka University of America

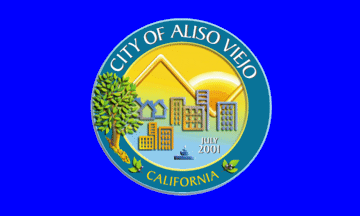
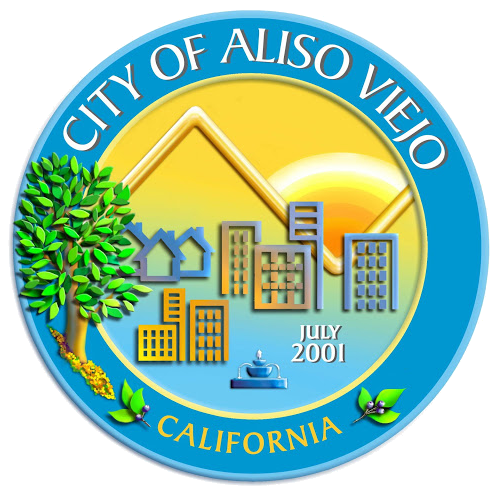
- Flag Seal
- Etymology: Spanish for "Old Alder Tree"
- Motto: "Live, Work, Learn, Shop and Play."
- Interactive map of Aliso Viejo, California
- Location in California Aliso Viejo (the United States) Aliso Viejo (North America)
- Coordinates: 33°34′30″N 117°43′32″W
- Country: United States
- State: California
- County: Orange
- Incorporated: July 1, 2001

Government
  - Type: Council-Manager
  - Mayor: Tiffany Ackley
  - Mayor Pro Tem: Max Duncan
  - Council members: Richard Hurt; Mike Munzing; Tim Zandbergen
  - City Manager: David Doyle

Area
  - Total: 6.93 sq mi (17.94 km^{2})
  - Land: 6.93 sq mi (17.94 km^{2})
  - Water: 0 sq mi (0.00 km^{2}) 0%
- Elevation: 410 ft (125 m)

Population (2020)
  - Total: 52,176
  - Density: 7,534/sq mi (2,908.8/km^{2})
- Time zone: UTC-8 (PST)
  - Summer (DST): UTC-7 (PDT)
- ZIP code: 92656, 92698
- Area code: 949
- FIPS code: 06-00947
- GNIS feature IDs: 252532, 2409683
- Website: avcity.org

Aliso Viejo (uh-LEE-so vee-AY-ho; Spanish for "old alder tree") is a city in the San Joaquin Hills of southern Orange County, California. It had a population of 52,176 as of the 2020 census, up from 47,823 as of the 2010 census. It became Orange County's 34th city on July 1, 2001, the only city in Orange County to be incorporated since 2000. It is bordered by the cities of Laguna Beach on the west and southwest, Laguna Hills on the east, Laguna Niguel on the southeast, and Laguna Woods on the north. It is similarly named to another nearby city, Mission Viejo.

== History ==
The Acjachemen are the Indigenous people of Aliso Viejo, who lived in the area for thousands of years. The people established numerous villages along Aliso Creek as well dividing the Acjachemen and the Tongva. With the arrival of settlers, the Acjachemen village sites would later become the southern areas of the Moulton Ranch.

The planned community of Aliso Viejo's original 6,600 acres (2,700 ha) were once part of the 26,000-acre (11,000 ha) Moulton Ranch, owned by the Moulton family, who took title in the 1890s to Rancho Niguel, originally granted to Juan Avila by the Mexican government in 1842. Over the years, portions of the ranch were sold and became Leisure World, Laguna Hills and Laguna Niguel.

In 1976, the Mission Viejo Company purchased the remaining 6,600 acres to create a new planned community – Aliso Viejo – with a master plan for 20,000 homes for a planned population of 50,000. The master plan was approved by the Orange County in 1979, and homes were first offered for sale in March 1982. Aliso Viejo's first family moved in that November. As part of the project, 2,600 acres (1,100 ha) were dedicated to Orange County as part of the Aliso and Wood Canyons Wilderness Park, and 800 acres (320 ha) were set aside for local parks, recreation, schools and community facilities.

The Aliso Viejo Community Association (AVCA) was set up to manage the local parks and community open space. It was the first community-wide association of its kind in California and has the unique ability to provide a full range of community services and facilities.

Aliso Viejo was the first planned community in California to plan a balance between the projected resident work force and the number of projected jobs within its borders. Pacific Park, the centrally located 900-acre (360 ha) business park and town center, was expected to ultimately provide more than 22,000 jobs. Every home in Aliso Viejo was located within 1 1/2 miles (2.4 km) of Pacific Park, to encourage live-and-work opportunities.

== Incorporation ==
Aliso Viejo had been an unincorporated community since 1979, and incorporated as a city in 2001 due to the efforts of the Aliso Viejo Cityhood 2000 Committee, which was responsible for introducing an initiative on the ballot for the 2001 special election. Voters passed the initiative with 93.3% in favor of incorporation. Carmen Vali-Cave, the co-founder and president of the committee, became the new city's first mayor.

The seal of the city of Aliso Viejo was adopted in 2001 at incorporation. The seal features several mountains, a sunset, a tree, and several buildings. Also, the seal features the slogan "July 2001", in celebration of the city's incorporation date.

Aliso Viejo is a general law city with a council-manager system of government. Day-to-day operations are handled by a professional city manager overseen by a volunteer city council. The City Council of Aliso Viejo consists of five members serving staggered four-year terms. Each year, the Council votes for its next Mayor and Mayor pro tem. The current City Council consists of Mayor Mike Munzing, Mayor Pro-Tem Tiffany Ackley, and Council Members David C. Harrington, Ross Chun, and William Phillips .

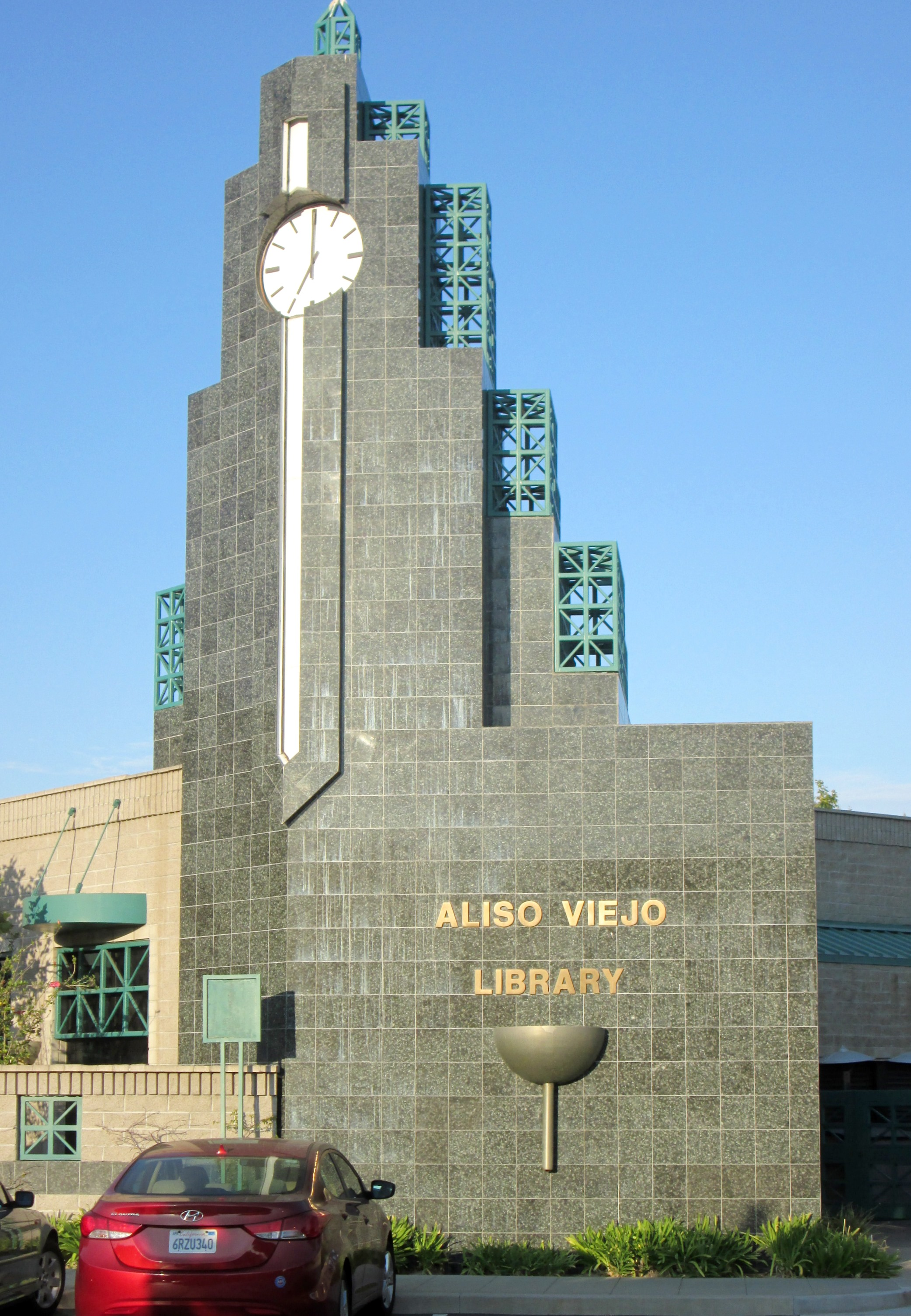
Clock tower of the Aliso Viejo Library

=== State, Federal, and County Representation ===
In the California State Legislature, Aliso Viejo is in the 37th senatorial district, represented by Republican Steven Choi, and in the 72nd Assembly district, represented by Republican Diane Dixon.

In the United States House of Representatives, Aliso Viejo is in California's 40th congressional district, represented by Republican Young Kim.

Additionally, in the Orange County Board of Supervisors, Aliso Viejo is in the 5th County District, represented by Katrina Foley since 2025.

=== Politics ===
Aliso Viejo is a swing city at the presidential level. According to the Orange County Registrar of Voters, as of May 15, 2025, Aliso Viejo has 33,064 registered voters. Of those, 9,210 (33.25%) are registered Republicans, 8,800 (31.77%) are registered Democrats, and 8,388 (30.28%) have declined to state a political party/are independents.

=== Crime ===
The Uniform Crime Report (UCR), collected annually by the FBI, compiles police statistics from local and state law enforcement agencies across the nation. The UCR records Part I and Part II crimes. Part I crimes become known to law enforcement and are considered the most serious crimes including homicide, rape, robbery, aggravated assault, burglary, larceny, motor vehicle theft, and arson. Part II crimes only include arrest data. The 2023 UCR Data is listed below:

2023 UCR Data
	Aggravated Assault	Homicide	Rape	Robbery	Burglary	Larceny Theft	Motor Vehicle Theft	Arson
Aliso Viejo	44	0	0	13	39	267	54	4

Aliso Viejo city vote by party in presidential elections
Year	Democratic	Republican	Third Parties
2024	52.57% 13,480	43.96% 11,273	3.46% 888
2020	56.48% 15,754	41.30% 11,519	2.22% 619
2016	51.63% 10,968	40.99% 8,708	7.37% 1,566
2012	47.27% 9,430	50.09% 9,991	2.64% 527
2008	52.65% 10,645	45.54% 9,207	1.81% 366
2004	40.73% 7,648	58.39% 10,964	0.88% 166

== Geography ==
Aliso Viejo is located at 33°34′30″N 117°43′32″W (33.575096, -117.725431) in the San Joaquin Hills of Orange County. According to the Census Bureau, the city has a total area of 7.5 square miles (19 km^{2}), all of which is land. Aliso Viejo is one of several cities bordering Aliso and Wood Canyons Regional Park. Aliso Creek forms part of the city's boundary with Laguna Niguel to the south, and Wood Canyon Creek forms part of the city's western boundary. Much of the city rests on the east slope of the San Joaquin Hills, which are a coastal mountain range extending for about 15 miles (24 km) along the Pacific coast.

=== Biogeography ===
The most common native species: Red Sand Verbena, Pink Sand Verbena, and Big Leaf Maple

Aliso Viejo

Climate chart (precipitation, max. and min. temperature)
J	F	M	A	M	J	J	A	S	O	N	D
0.8 79 59	1.5 78 59	0.7 70 58	0.9 87 59	0 71 61	0 87 70	0 84 70	0 90 70	0 105 76	0 83 70	0 80 58	0 80 55
- █ Average max. and min. temperatures in °F
- █ Precipitation totals in inches
- Source: Weather Underground
Metric conversion
J	F	M	A	M	J	J	A	S	O	N	D
21 26 15	38 26 15	18 21 14	24 31 15	0 22 16	0 31 21	0 29 21	0 32 21	0 41 24	0 28 21	0 27 14	0 27 13
- █ Average max. and min. temperatures in °C
- █ Precipitation totals in mm

== Demographics ==
Historical population
Census	Pop.	Note	%±
1990	7,612		—
2000	40,166		427.7%
2010	47,823		19.1%
2020	52,176		9.1%
U.S. Decennial Census; 1850–1870 1880-1890; 1900 1910 1920; 1930 1940 1950; 1960 1970 1980; 1990 2000 2010 2020

Aliso Viejo first appeared as a census-designated place in the 1980 United States census; and after incorporation in 2001, as a city in the 2010 U.S. census.

=== Racial and ethnic composition ===
Aliso Viejo city, California – Racial and ethnic composition Note: the US Census treats Hispanic/Latino as an ethnic category. This table excludes Latinos from the racial categories and assigns them to a separate category. Hispanics/Latinos may be of any race.
Race / Ethnicity (NH = Non-Hispanic)	Pop 1990	Pop 2000	Pop 2010	Pop 2020	% 1990	% 2000	% 2010	% 2020
White alone (NH)	5,924	28,599	29,538	29,044	77.82%	71.20%	61.77%	55.67%
Black or African American alone (NH)	117	790	892	949	1.54%	1.97%	1.87%	1.82%
Native American or Alaska Native alone (NH)	28	107	82	48	0.37%	0.27%	0.17%	0.09%
Asian alone (NH)	595	4,367	6,902	8,509	7.82%	10.87%	14.43%	16.31%
Native Hawaiian or Pacific Islander alone (NH)	11	78	75	155	0.15%	0.19%	0.16%	0.30%
Other race alone (NH)	8	102	136	323	0.11%	0.25%	0.28%	0.62%
Mixed race or Multiracial (NH)	x	1,443	2,034	3,312	x	3.59%	4.25%	6.35%
Hispanic or Latino (any race)	940	4,680	8,164	9,836	12.35%	11.65%	17.07%	18.85%
Total	7,631	40,166	47,823	52,176	100.00	100.00%	100.00%	100.00%

=== 2020 census ===
As of the 2020 census, Aliso Viejo had a population of 52,176. The median age was 38.8 years. 22.2% of residents were under the age of 18 and 10.5% of residents were 65 years of age or older. For every 100 females there were 91.0 males, and for every 100 females age 18 and over there were 87.6 males age 18 and over. The racial makeup (including Hispanics in the racial counts) was 68.3% White, 2.7% African American, and 15.4% Asian, while Hispanic or Latino residents of any race were 18.8%. 100.0% of residents lived in urban areas, while 0.0% lived in rural areas.

There were 19,565 households in Aliso Viejo, of which 35.3% had children under the age of 18 living in them. Of all households, 52.5% were married-couple households, 14.7% were households with a male householder and no spouse or partner present, and 26.3% were households with a female householder and no spouse or partner present. About 22.8% of all households were made up of individuals and 6.3% had someone living alone who was 65 years of age or older.

There were 20,189 housing units, of which 3.1% were vacant. The homeowner vacancy rate was 0.5% and the rental vacancy rate was 4.3%.

Racial composition as of the 2020 census
Race	Number	Percent
White	31,290	60.0%
Black or African American	1,009	1.9%
American Indian and Alaska Native	232	0.4%
Asian	8,642	16.6%
Native Hawaiian and Other Pacific Islander	182	0.3%
Some other race	3,456	6.6%
Two or more races	7,365	14.1%
Hispanic or Latino (of any race)	9,836	18.9%

=== Income ===
The median household income in 2023 was $137,970, and the per capita income was $64,689. About 3.0% of families and 5.2% of the population were below the poverty line.

=== 2010 census ===
The 2010 United States census reported that Aliso Viejo had a population of 47,823. The population density was 6,400.4 inhabitants per square mile (2,471.2/km^{2}). The racial makeup of Aliso Viejo was 34,437 (89.0%) White (77.8% Non-Hispanic White), 967 (2.0%) African American, 151 (0.1%) Native American, 6,996 (14.6%) Asian, 89 (0.2%) Pacific Islander, 2,446 (5.1%) from other races, and 2,737 (5.7%) from two or more races. Hispanic or Latino of any race were 8,164 persons (17.1%).

The Census reported that 47,354 people (99.0% of the population) lived in households, 450 (0.9%) lived in non-institutionalized group quarters, and 19 (0%) were institutionalized.

There were 18,204 households, out of which 7,095 (39.0%) had children under the age of 18 living in them, 9,358 (51.4%) were opposite-sex married couples living together, 1,966 (10.8%) had a female householder with no husband present, 791 (4.3%) had a male householder with no wife present. There were 987 (5.4%) unmarried opposite-sex partnerships, and 206 (1.1%) same-sex married couples or partnerships. 4,416 households (24.3%) were made up of individuals, and 638 (3.5%) had someone living alone who was 65 years of age or older. The average household size was 2.60. There were 12,115 families (66.6% of all households); the average family size was 3.16.

The population was spread out, with 12,395 people (25.9%) under the age of 18, 3,739 people (7.8%) aged 18 to 24, 17,138 people (35.8%) aged 25 to 44, 12,003 people (25.1%) aged 45 to 64, and 2,548 people (5.3%) who were 65 years of age or older. The median age was 35.1 years. For every 100 females, there were 92.8 males. For every 100 females age 18 and over, there were 89.2 males.

There were 18,867 housing units at an average density of 2,525.1 per square mile (974.9/km^{2}), of which 11,049 (60.7%) were owner-occupied, and 7,155 (39.3%) were occupied by renters. The homeowner vacancy rate was 1.2%; the rental vacancy rate was 3.6%. 29,819 people (62.4% of the population) lived in owner-occupied housing units and 17,535 people (36.7%) lived in rental housing units.

== Economy ==
Companies located in Aliso Viejo include:

- 3tera, a cloud computing software vendor
- AND1, a shoe and apparel company
- Buy.com, an online retailer
- Centon Electronics, Inc., a manufacturer of computer memory and flash-based storage devices
- Fluor, an international construction contractor for petrochemical, infrastructure, and environmental projects, headquartered in Aliso Viejo until it was relocated to the Dallas-Fort Worth Metroplex suburb of Irving, Texas in March 2006. Some divisions still reside in Aliso Viejo.
- Ketel One, a vodka company
- Marie Callender's, a restaurant chain
- Microsoft's office after the purchase of DATAllegro
- Nimbus Data, a network storage systems and software company
- Pacific Life, an insurance company
- QLogic, a network storage manufacturer
- Quest Software (formerly Dell Software), a software manufacturer
- Smith Micro Software, a software developer
- Tamiya America, US subsidiary of the manufacturer of model cars Tamiya Corporation, headquartered in Aliso Viejo until it was relocated to Irvine, CA.
- UST Global, an IT, Technology and Digital Transformation company
- USWeb, an Internet marketing company
- Microsemi Corporation, a semiconductor company
- Sony Interactive Entertainment, a multinational video game and digital entertainment company
- Carbine Studios, a video game developer, partnered with NCSOFT
- Metagenics, a medical manufacturing company
- Meta Solar, a solar energy installation company
- Vertos Medical, a manufacturer of surgical instruments used to perform minimally invasive procedures
- Ambry Genetics, a health care genetic lab, a subsidiary of parent company Konica Minolta

=== Top employers ===
According to the city's FY25 Comprehensive Annual Financial Report, the top employers in the city are:

#	Employer	# of employees	Percent of Total Employment
1	MicroVention, Inc	1700	6.05%
2	United Parcel Service	1200	4.27%
3	Glaukos Corporation	995	3.54%
4	RxSight, Inc	943	3.36%
5	Ambry Genetics Corporation	706	2.51%
6	Capistrano Unified School District	540	1.92%
7	Orange County Sheriff's Department	450	1.60%
8	UST Global, Inc	349	1.24%
9	Metagenics	280	1.00%
10	Avanir Pharmaceuticals, Inc	195	0.69%

== Points of interest ==
- The Aliso Viejo Library, a branch of the Orange County Public Library system, opened on January 31, 1998 and was closed for tenant improvements on April 15, 2024.
- Aliso Viejo Golf Course was designed by Nicklaus Design in 1999 and became the Aliso Viejo Country Club with a redesign in 2005.
- Soka University of America was dedicated on May 3, 2001, with a 103-acre campus and 18 buildings, a $250 million (land and construction) project.
- Soka Performing Arts Center, a 1,000-seat concert hall with acoustics designed by Yasuhisa Toyota (who also designed Walt Disney Concert Hall); opened in September 2011.

== Sports teams ==
- The Orange County Gladiators were an American Basketball Association (ABA) expansion team founded in November 2007 until 2009. They played their home games at Aliso Niguel High School.

== Emergency services ==
Fire protection in Aliso Viejo is provided by the Orange County Fire Authority with ambulance service by Care Ambulance. Law enforcement is provided by the Orange County Sheriff's Department.

Health Care

- Aliso Ridge Behavioral Health (Hospital)
- Hoag Urgent Care Aliso Viejo (Urgent Care)

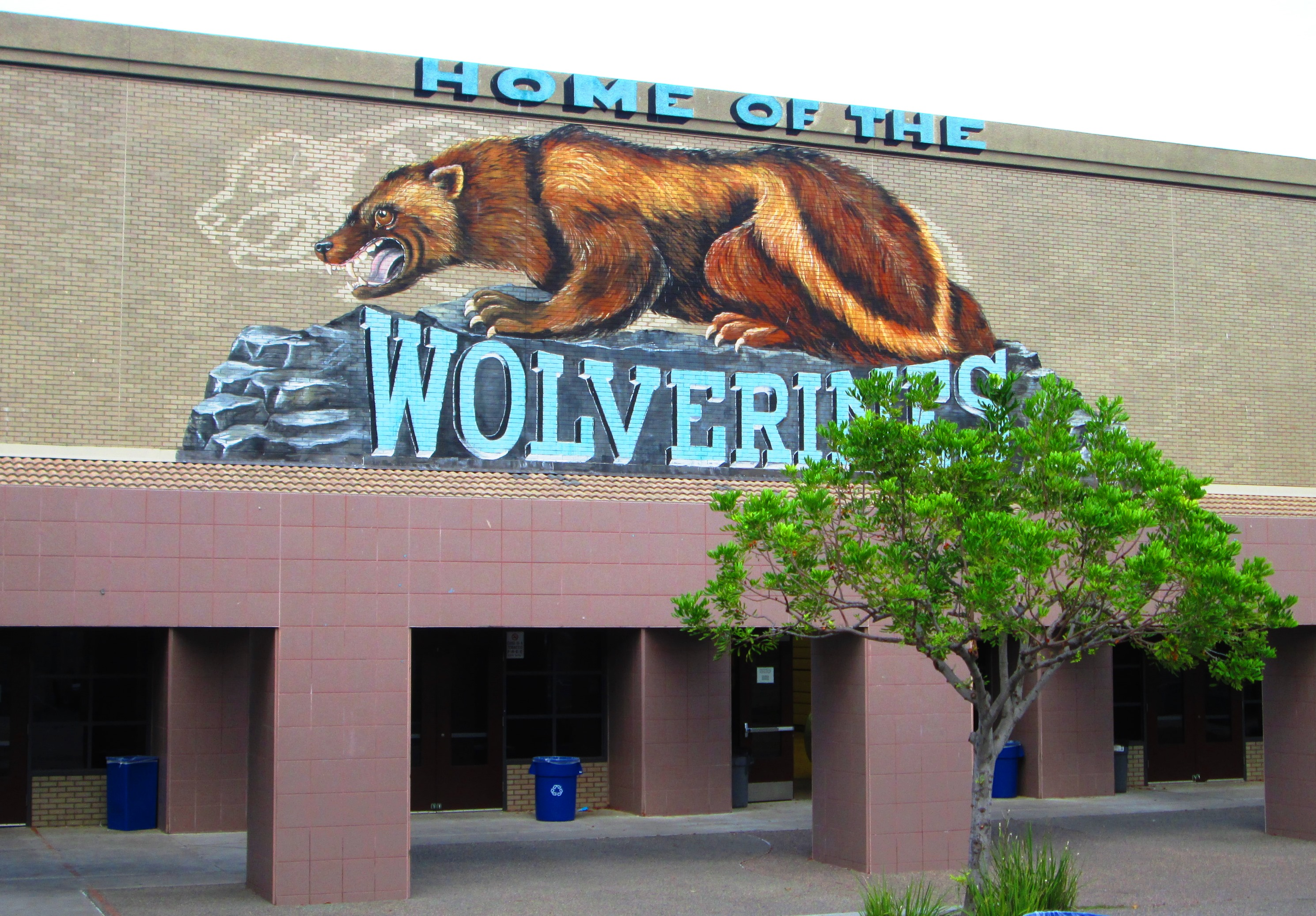
Aliso Niguel High School

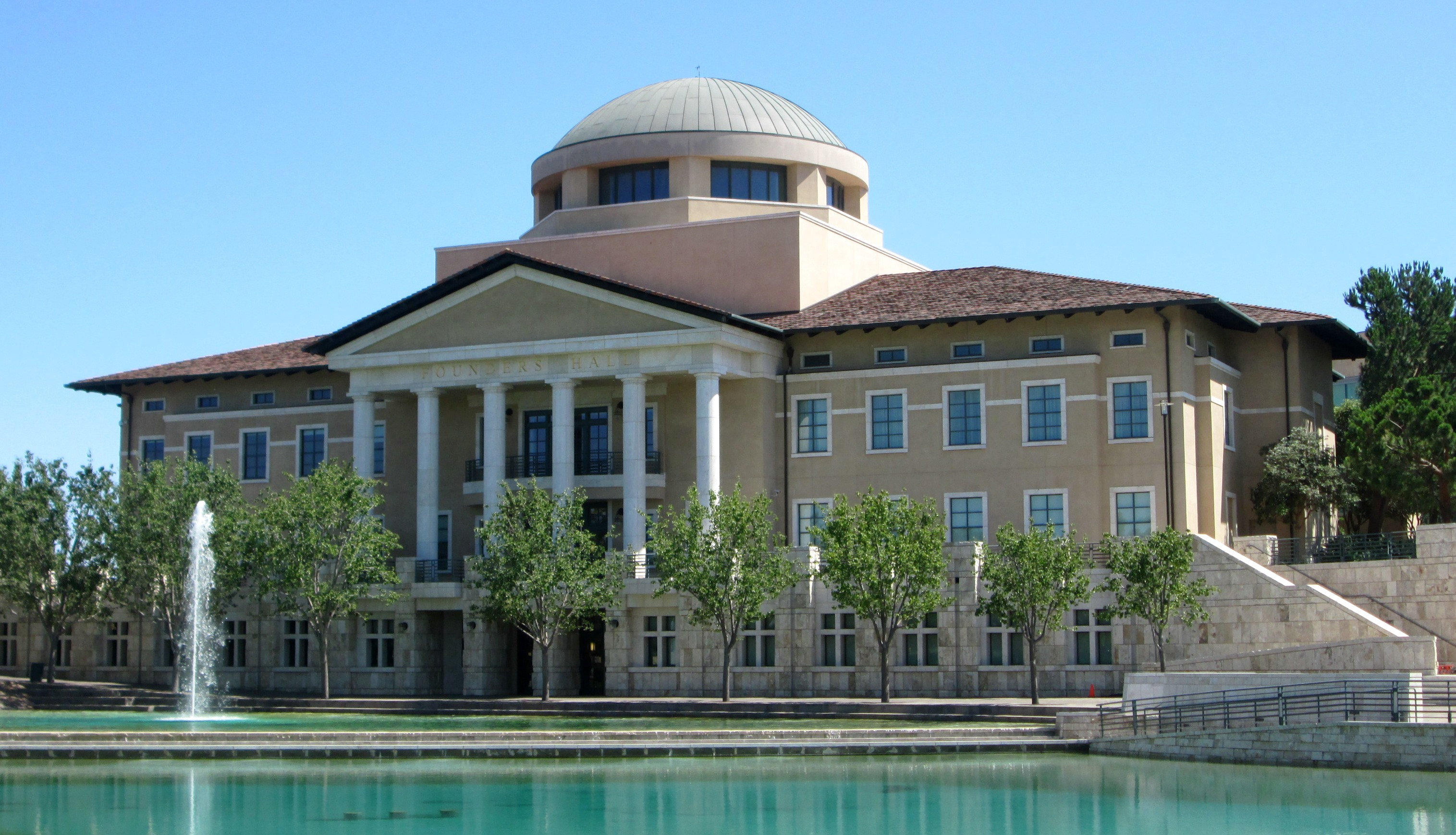
Founders Hall of Soka University of America

== Education ==
=== Public K–12 ===
A tiny portion of the city, the Bells Vireo neighborhood of El Toro Road, are contracted out to the Laguna Beach Unified School District in Laguna Beach. Due to the city's inaccessibility at times, students who live in that portion may choose to attend the Capistrano Unified School District, which includes these schools:

Elementary

- Canyon Vista Elementary School
- Don Juan Avila Elementary School
- Oak Grove Elementary School
- Wood Canyon Elementary School

Middle school

- Aliso Viejo Middle School
- Don Juan Avila Middle School

High school

- Aliso Niguel High School

=== Private K–12 ===
- VanDamme Academy
- St. Mary and All Angels School
- Aliso Viejo Christian School

=== Higher education ===
- Saddleback College (Mission Viejo, California)
- Irvine Valley College (Irvine, California)
- Orange Coast College (Costa Mesa, California)
- Soka University of America (Aliso Viejo, California)

== Infrastructure ==
=== Transportation ===
Orange County Transportation Authority operates local bus service.

=== Water ===
Water is supplied by the Moulton Niguel Water District, which sources its water from the Metropolitan Water District of Southern California. This water is imported from both the Colorado River and the State Water Project.

== Notable people ==
- Farzad Bonyadi, professional poker player
- Ryan Coiner, soccer player
- Ryan Getzlaf, center for the Anaheim Ducks
- Jim Gilchrist, politician and founder of the Minuteman Project
- Kenneth Kizer, CEO and former Under Secretary of Health in the United States Department of Veterans Affairs
- Ivan Koumaev, contestant on the reality series So You Think You Can Dance
- Royce Lewis, baseball player, first selection of 2017 MLB draft
- Jason Martin, indie rock musician
- Marc Maiffret, computer security expert/computer hacker
- McKayla Maroney, gymnast, 2012 Olympic champion
- Alex Michelsen, tennis player, 2022 Wimbledon Boys' Doubles champion
- Ashley Palmer, actress, Paranormal Activity
- Kathryn Plummer, professional volleyball player for Imoco Volley
- Kyla Ross, gymnast, 2012 Olympic champion
- Blake Sabol, baseball player for the San Francisco Giants
- Toni Turner, author
- Alisa Valdez-Rodriguez, author
- Ashley Wagner, figure skater, 3-time U.S. champion
- Alicia Leigh Willis, actress known for her role as Courtney Matthews on General Hospital
