= Anthony Turner =

Anthony, Antony or Tony Turner may refer to:

- Anthony Turner (actor) (fl. 1622–1659), English actor
- Anthony Turner (martyr) (1628–1679), English Jesuit and martyr
- Antony Turner (cricketer) (1907–1959), English cricketer and British Army officer
- Tony Turner (diver) (1933–2021), British diver
- Tony Turner (priest) (1930–2020), English Anglican clergyman
- Tony Turner (scientist) (born 1950), English academic in the field of biosensors
- Tony Turner (20th-century actor), British actor in Her Naked Skin
- Tony Turner, Canadian writer of the protest song "Harperman"

== See also ==
- Toni Turner, president of TrendStar Group, Inc.
