= Max & Erma's =

American restaurant chain

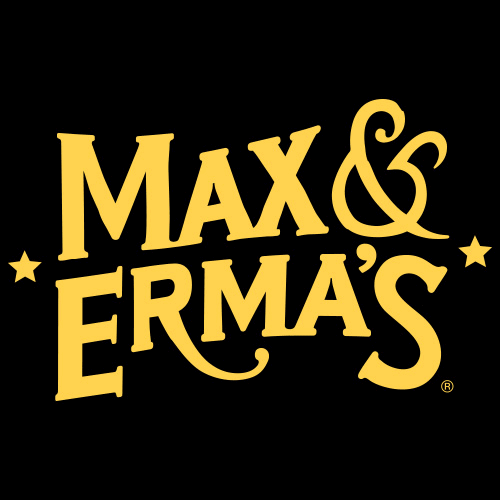
- Type: Subsidiary
- Industry: Restaurant
- Founded: 1972
- Headquarters: Columbus, Ohio
- Key people: Todd Barnum and Barry Zacks (co-founders)
- Parent: Glacier Restaurant Group
- Website: www.maxandermas.com

Max & Erma's is an American casual dining restaurant chain based in Columbus, Ohio. As of November 2026, the company operates four locations in Ohio, and Pennsylvania, down from a peak of 110 restaurants across more than 12 states in the mid-2000s. It was founded in 1972 by Todd Barnum and Barry Zacks. The two businessmen purchased a local tavern in Columbus's German Village which had been operated by Max and Erma Visocnik since 1958; Erma died in 1977, and Max died in 1995. Barnum and Zacks retained the Max & Erma's name and created the theme restaurant, which featured a converted bathtub serving as a sundae bar.

Max & Erma's was purchased by Pittsburgh-based equity investor G&R Acquisition Inc. in a $10.2 million deal in April 2008. The company declared Chapter 11 bankruptcy on October 26, 2009. It was acquired by American Blue Ribbon Holdings, owners of the Village Inn and Bakers Square restaurant chains, in 2010.

On January 25, 2016, it was announced that Glacier Restaurant Group had purchased Max & Erma's from American Blue Ribbon Holdings. The sale followed the closure of 19 of the restaurant's locations that were described as underperforming.

On July 28, 2017, Glacier announced that the original German Village Max & Erma's location would close on August 7, 2017, citing a lack of financial viability.

== Gallery ==
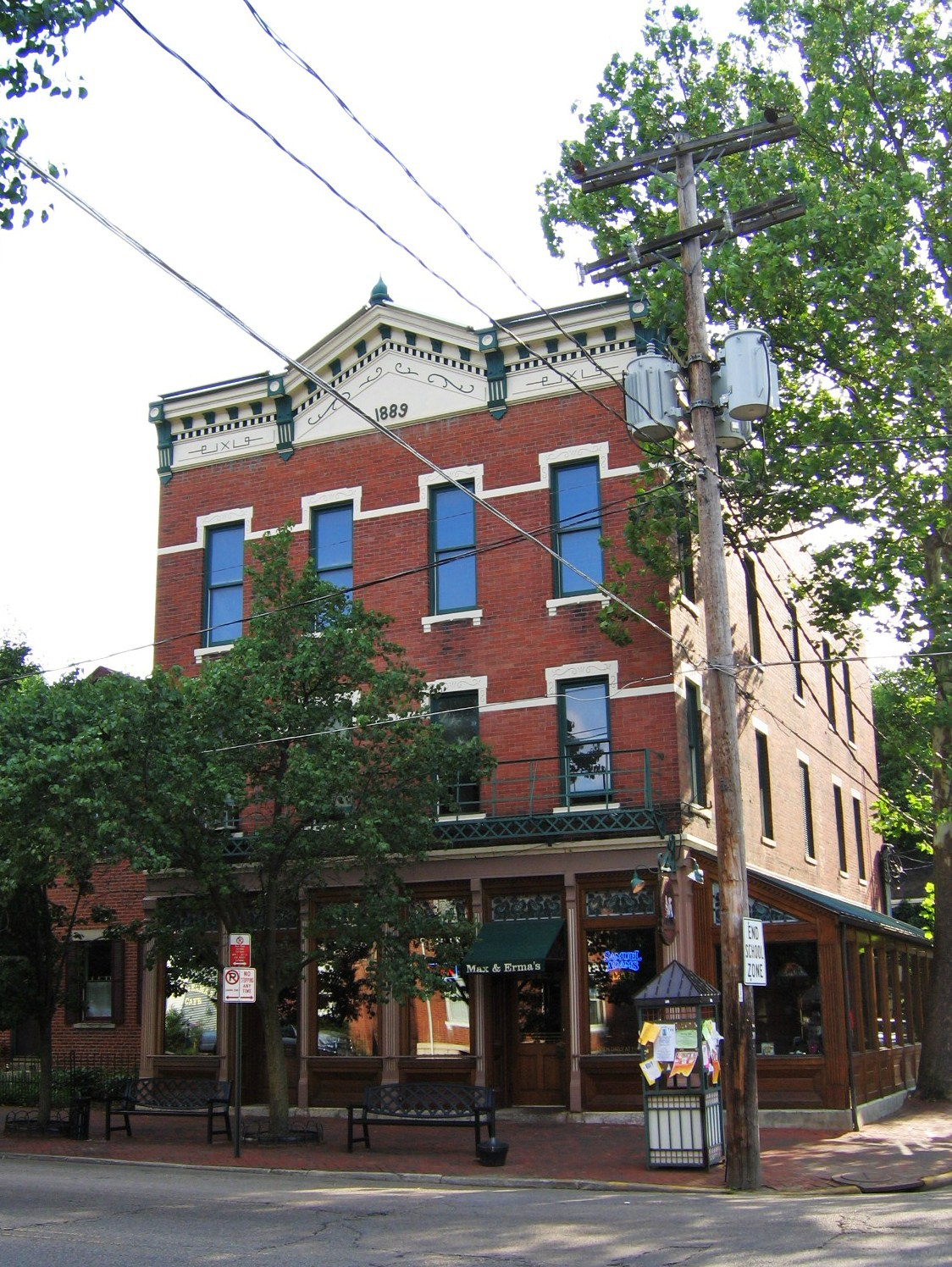
The original Max & Erma's, Columbus, Ohio

Old Max & Erma's logo from 1972 to 2005 and as alternate logo from 2005 to 2007

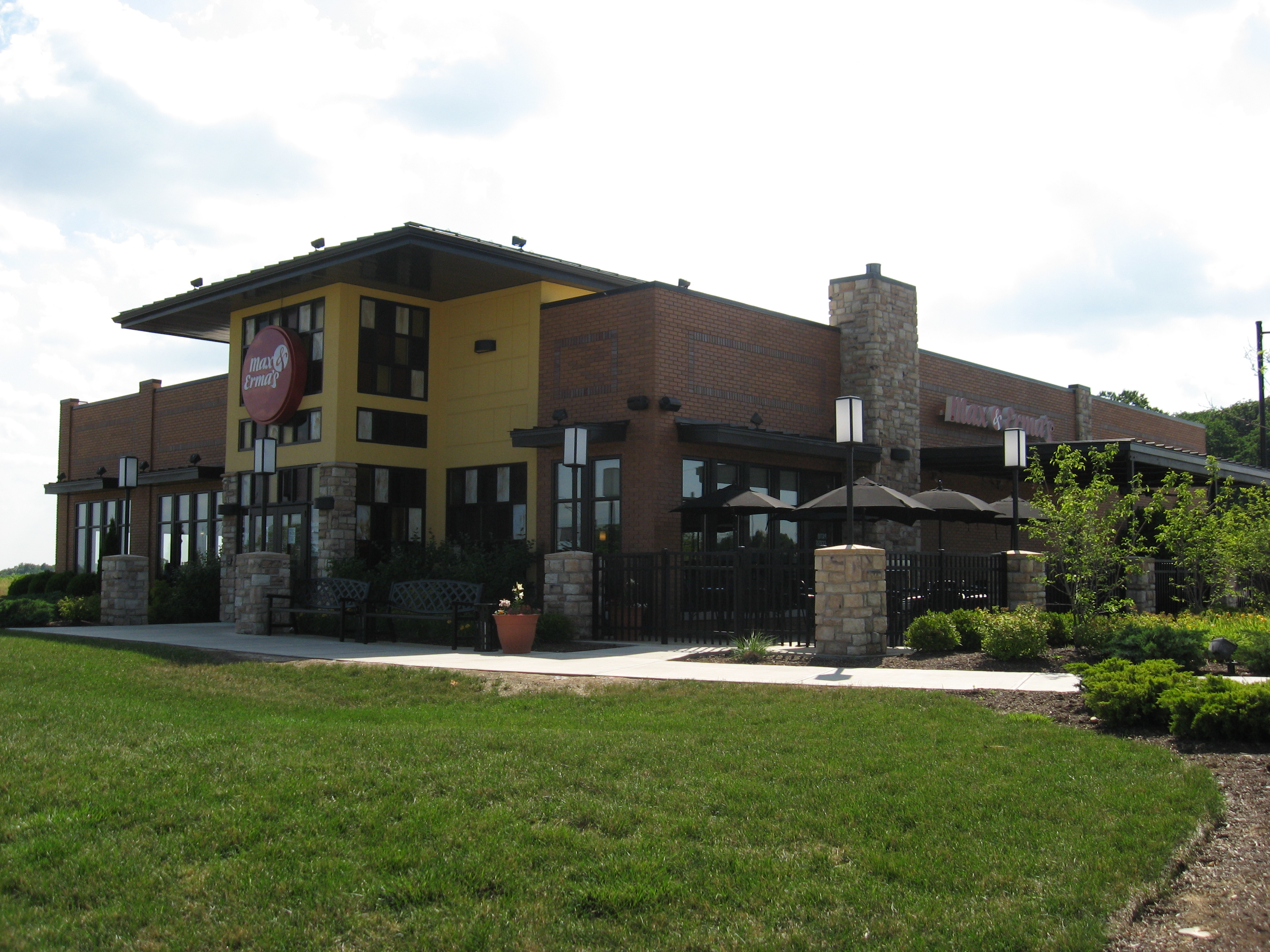
Max and Erma's location in Springboro, Ohio
