= Jim Melvin =

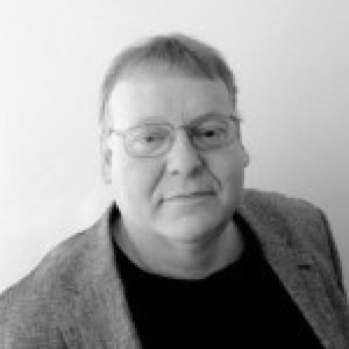
- Melvin in 2015
- Education: Tulane University
- Occupations: Entrepreneur, investor, and philanthropist
- Known for: SIVA Corporation: Sold to PAR (NYSE:PAR) in 2006; Apigent Solutions: Sold to McDonald's (NYSE:MCD) in 2002; Compris Technologies: Sold to NCR (NYSE:NCR) in 1997
- Spouse: Beth Padnos
- Children: 3

James Walter Melvin is an American entrepreneur, investor, and philanthropist who founded and served as the CEO of several notable software companies in the foodservice and hospitality industries. His software products have been installed at more than 125,000 stores worldwide for companies such as McDonald's, YUM! Brands, Burger King, Wendy's, Disney, Darden Restaurants, K-Mart, Costco, FedEx, Walmart, Foot Locker and many others.

== Early life ==
Melvin was an early fan of Dungeons & Dragons. At 15 years old, Melvin met Gary Gygax at a fan convention, where the two discussed an idea for automating the role of the Dungeon Master. At the urging of Gygax, Melvin created GameAssist using Z80 assembly on TRS-80 computers. GameAssist was a tool to assist Dungeon Masters in the Dungeons & Dragons game with tracking player statistics and inventory and in managing and generating creature encounters. Melvin sold the Intellectual property behind GameAssist in 1980 to a gaming supplies store after he left to attend college at Tulane University.

== Introduction to the foodservice industry ==
Melvin's career of creating technology solutions for the foodservice industry began when he was 18 years old, when he was hired by a Wendy's franchisee to develop software for the franchisee's Wendy's stores. This software was later adopted by Wendy's corporate.

In 1986, Melvin co-founded Techwerks. Techwerks became one of the largest global resellers of NCR retail hardware. While at Techwerks, Melvin developed touchscreen point of sale software called "Foodwerks" for fast food restaurants.

Foodwerks was sold in April 1989 for almost $2 million to an investor group led by Melvin.

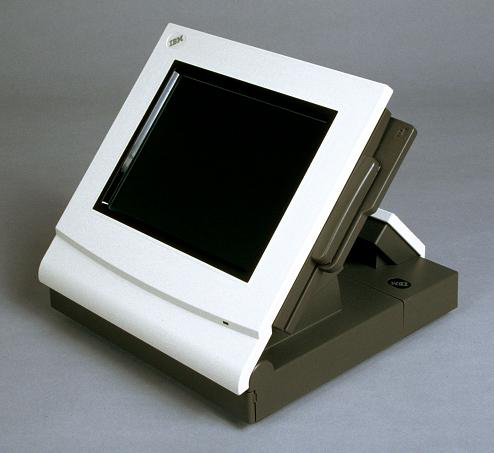
The IBM 4695, a second generation touchscreen POS unit.

== Compris Technologies ==
With support from Dave Thomas, and financial backing from IBM, Melvin founded Compris Technologies in late 1989. The primary product offered by Compris Technologies was a point of sale (POS) software application. IBM, in a partnership with Compris Technologies, created the first commercial IBM touchscreen POS units, IBM kiosk POS units and IBM handheld POS units. As a result, the Compris POS software application was first mainly installed on IBM 46xx Series hardware, but later supported by several other POS hardware manufacturers including NCR. Between 1989 and 1992, Compris quickly grew to become the dominant global provider of foodservice technology. The Compris POS software continued to increase in popularity throughout the late 1990s and early 2000s, winning several Microsoft Retail Application Developer (RAD) Awards.

== Apigent Solutions ==
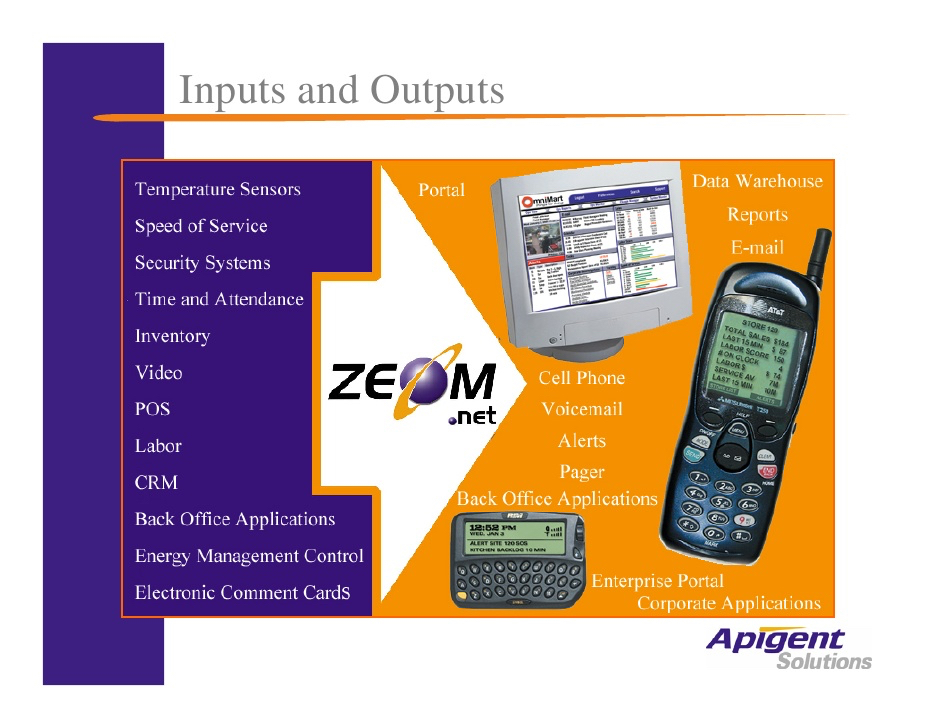
An overview of Apigent Solution's Zeom.net product.

In 2000, Melvin founded Apigent Solutions. Other technology companies, such as Par Technology Corporation, partnered with Apigent Solutions to provide comprehensive technology offerings to foodservice chains within the quick service (QSR) segment. At the time, Apigent Solutions was the only Sun Microsystems SunTone Certified data center in the foodservice industry.

In 2002, Apigent Solutions was sold to eMac Digital, a joint venture backed by McDonald's and KKR.

== SIVA Corporation ==
On January 1, 2003, Melvin acquired SIVA Corporation, a provider of cloud-based POS software, from a private investor group. Melvin shut down the business for a year following the acquisition to rearchitect the underlying technology as an enterprise-focused system. Upon completion of the reengineering effort, Darden Restaurants became iSIVA's first customer in 2003. Over the next four years, the iSIVA product grew in popularity and was adopted by Luby's, Fuddruckers, Legal Sea Foods, CoCo's, Carrows, Miller's Alehouse and many others.

== Other ventures ==
Following his tenure at Par Technology Corporation, Melvin served as an advisor and investor for several technology start-ups in the foodservice space. In 2014, Melvin joined the board of advisors for the House of Genius, a Startup accelerator. Melvin currently occupies the role of CEO for Intelligent Transactions, a strategic technology consultancy for the foodservice industry.

== Philanthropy ==
In 1998, in a partnership with the National Restaurant Association, Melvin co-founded the technology pavilion for the association's annual trade show in Chicago to help promote innovation within the foodservice industry. Melvin's other philanthropic endeavors included serving on the FDA's Food Safety Technology Advisory Panel and participating as an advisory board member for Round It Up America.

In 2013, Melvin co-founded the Food Service Educational Alliance, a non-profit organization dedicated to investigating and advancing educational opportunities for workers in the foodservice industry.
