= Cerno LLC =

American industrial design and lighting company

- Industry: industrial design manufacturing furniture LED lighting
- Founder: Daniel Wacholder, Nick Sheridan, Bret Englander
- Headquarters: 22892 Glenwood Dr; Aliso Viejo, California, United States
- Website: www.cernogroup.com

Cerno is a business based in Aliso Viejo, California, specializing in modern LED lighting fixtures that are designed and manufactured in the United States.

== History ==
The company was founded in Laguna Beach, CA in March 2009 by childhood friends Bret Englander, Nick Sheridan and Daniel Wacholder. One of their first projects which led to the founding of the company was a proposal for a large-scale LED light installation for the 2010 Winter Olympics. The project did not come to fruition due to Olympic budget issues, but the founders decided to continue growing their start-up business.

Since Cerno first emerged in 2009 the company has grown from the 3 founders to a team of over 50 employees. Cerno has worked with many of the leading design and architecture firms in the United States and abroad. In 2011 Cerno's founders launched REVELITE. The Revelite arm of Cerno specializes in making extremely high-quality art lighting.

Cerno is a vertically integrated manufacturer, which means their entire process happens under one roof at their Southern California headquarters. Cerno's founders attribute their success to their cohesive process of designing, engineering, and manufacturing at one location. Their vertical integration allows for their products to be more fully resolved. Cerno is Latin word that means to resolve.

The company has been covered by both national and local media, such as eco-friendly consumerist magazine Dwell, the Los Angeles Times, and the Chicago Tribune. "Despite its funky looking head, Sero is still all about form following function." said Michael Hsu, in an article he recently published in The Wall Street Journal.

== Collaborations ==
Cerno has branched out into collaborations with designers in other fields. In 2011, Cerno collaborated with the fashion designer Jesse Kamm to produce shades for Silva. They have also collaborated with designer Frank Carfaro to produce the LED lamp Forma.

== Events ==
Cerno has attended various design trade shows around the country including ICFF, Dwell on Design, NYIGF and Source LA. One of Cerno's accolades include the LED Award at from the LED Show in Las Vegas.

In 2014 Cerno won the best lighting award at 3 prestigious design fairs. Cerno took home the honor of best lighting at WestEdge in Los Angeles, CA, BDNY in New York City and Dwell on Design in Los Angeles.
