= Kilzer =

Kilzer is a surname. Notable people with the surname include:

- John Kilzer (1957–2019), American rock singer and songwriter
- Lou Kilzer (born 1951), American investigative journalist and author
- Ralph Kilzer (born 1935), American politician

== See also ==
- Kizer
