= Sambo's =

American restaurant chain

Coordinates: 34°24′35″N 119°41′32″W

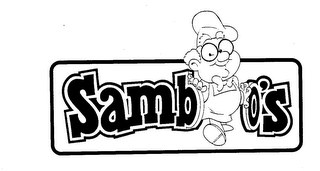
- Sambo's logo from the 1980s

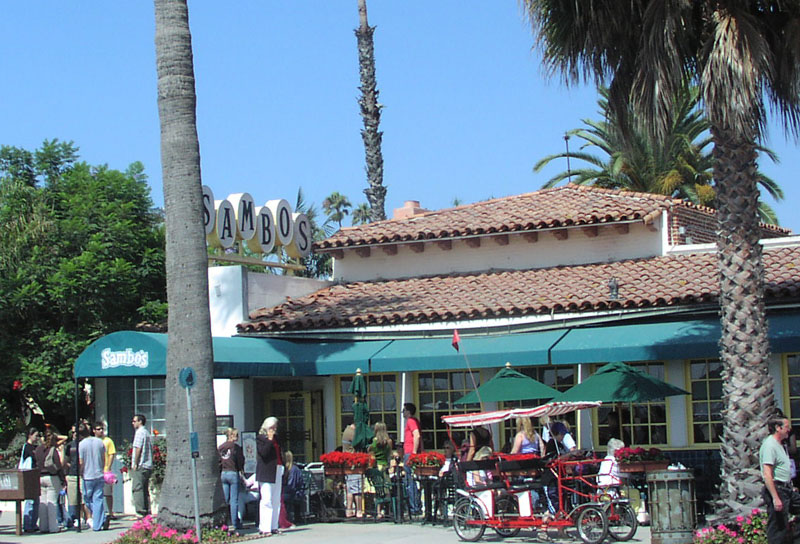
- The first and last Sambo's Restaurant in Santa Barbara, California (2005)
- Formerly: The Jolly Tiger (12 locations); No Place Like Sam's (some locations)
- Fate: Chapter 11 bankruptcy (1981) Remaining chain sold to Vicorp (1984) Last restaurant renamed (2020)
- Headquarters: Santa Barbara, California
- Number of locations: 1,117 (1979)

Sambo's was an American restaurant chain, started in 1957 by Sam Battistone Sr. and Newell Bohnett in Santa Barbara, California. Though the name was taken from portions of the names of its two founders, the chain also associated with The Story of Little Black Sambo. Battistone and Bohnett capitalized on this connection by decorating the walls of the restaurants with scenes from the book, including tigers and a dark-skinned boy. By the early 1960s, the illustrations depicted a light-skinned boy wearing a jeweled Indian-style turban with the tigers. A kids club, Sambo's Tiger Tamers (later called the Tiger Club), promoted the chain's family image. The chain filed for Chapter 11 bankruptcy in November 1981. All locations except for the first in Santa Barbara either closed outright, or were renamed after being purchased, effectively ending the chain's existence.

The Santa Barbara restaurant continued business under the Sambo's name until 2020, when it was renamed to Chad's after its owner at the time, Chad Stevens. The George Floyd protests against racism in the United States resulted in the owner of the restaurant changing the name of the establishment.

== History ==
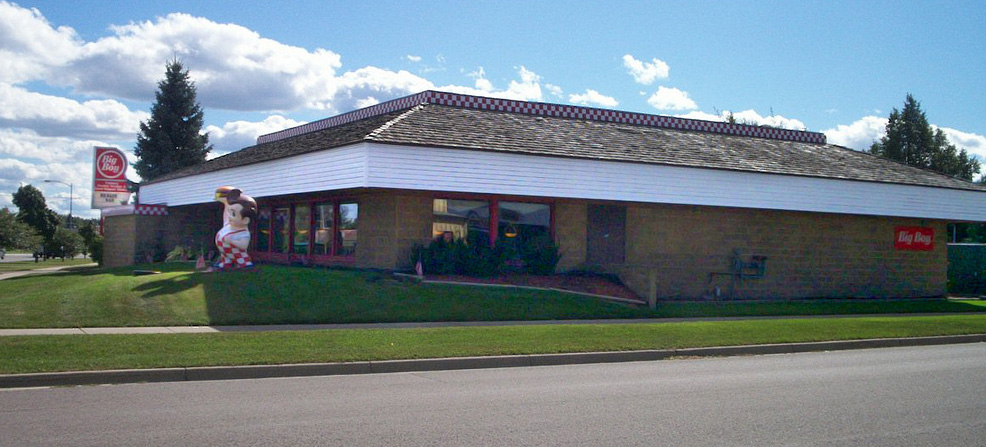
A former Sambo's in Alpena, Michigan, now occupied by Big Boy

After the first Sambo's was opened in 1957, the restaurant was expanded to more locations. In late 1963, it had restaurants in 16 cities in California, Oregon, Nevada, and Arizona. By 1969, the company had grown to 98 locations, and over the next two years diversified to create additional restaurant franchises, including Red Top Hamburgers, Heidi's Pie Shop, and the Blue Ox Steak House. In 1979, Sambo's had 1,117 outlets in 47 American states. There was a Sambo's restaurant in Vernon, British Columbia located at 4215-32st.

In the latter half of the 1970s, pressure began to mount on the chain to change its name, drawing protests and lawsuits in communities that viewed the term Sambo as pejorative towards Black Americans. Twelve of its restaurants were opened as or renamed "The Jolly Tiger" in locations where the local community passed resolutions forbidding the use of the original name or refused to grant the chain permits. The last of these restaurants was created in December 1977. In March 1979, the company reversed course on its "Jolly Tiger" restaurants and stated their intent to rename all of them back to Sambo's. The company cited poor financial performance of these restaurants; the company's "constitutional, legal, and moral right to operate (those restaurants) under its corporate name"; and the assertion that Black people did not object to the name, citing studies that showed that "three times as many blacks ate at Sambo's as at any other full-service restaurant".

Additional corporate level decisions made at the time also led to Sambo's corporate demise. Pressure to take Sambo's into a more normal, salaried manager compensation package was one issue. Their unique "Fraction of the Action" promotion – whereby managers were entitled to 20% of the profits from their stores, with employees allowed to bid for a percentage of the remaining profits – was an early company expansion plan, and the growth of the company outpaced its control. In March 1981, in a further attempt to give the chain a new image the company again renamed some locations, this time to "No Place Like Sam's". By November 1981, the company filed for bankruptcy. Neither the name change nor bankruptcy protection reversed this downward trend, and by 1982 all except the original Sambo's at 216 West Cabrillo Boulevard in Santa Barbara, California closed their doors. By February 1983, 618 of the locations were renamed Season's Friendly Eating. Several locations were sold to Denny's, including the Fort Lauderdale store. Bakers Square's parent company acquired Sambo's in California in October 1984. Many Sambo's locations were converted to Bakers Square restaurants and the ones that weren't were sold to other chains, including Denny's.

Battistone's grandson, Chad Stevens, owns the only remaining restaurant in Santa Barbara which continued business under the Sambo's name until 2020. In late May 2020, George Floyd protests against racism in the United States began in cities across the United States, including Santa Barbara. A petition drive asked the owner to change the name of Sambo's. In June 2020, the name on the original Sambo's sign was temporarily changed to the motto "☮ & LOVE" ("Peace and love"). In July 2020, the restaurant was officially renamed to "Chad's".

== In popular culture ==
Sam Battistone, Jr. was the original owner of the New Orleans Jazz of the NBA. Battistone founded the team in 1974, moved it to Utah in 1979, and sold his majority interest to Larry H. Miller in 1986.

An abandoned Sambo's was cleaned up and used for a scene in the movie Edward Scissorhands.

The restaurant was referenced in a sketch on the TV show MadTV, set at a 1950s themed diner which humorously enforced racist laws from that era.
