= The Bear Pit Bar-B-Q =

Barbecue restaurant in Mission Hills, Los Angeles, US

Coordinates: 34.2669°N 118.4677°W

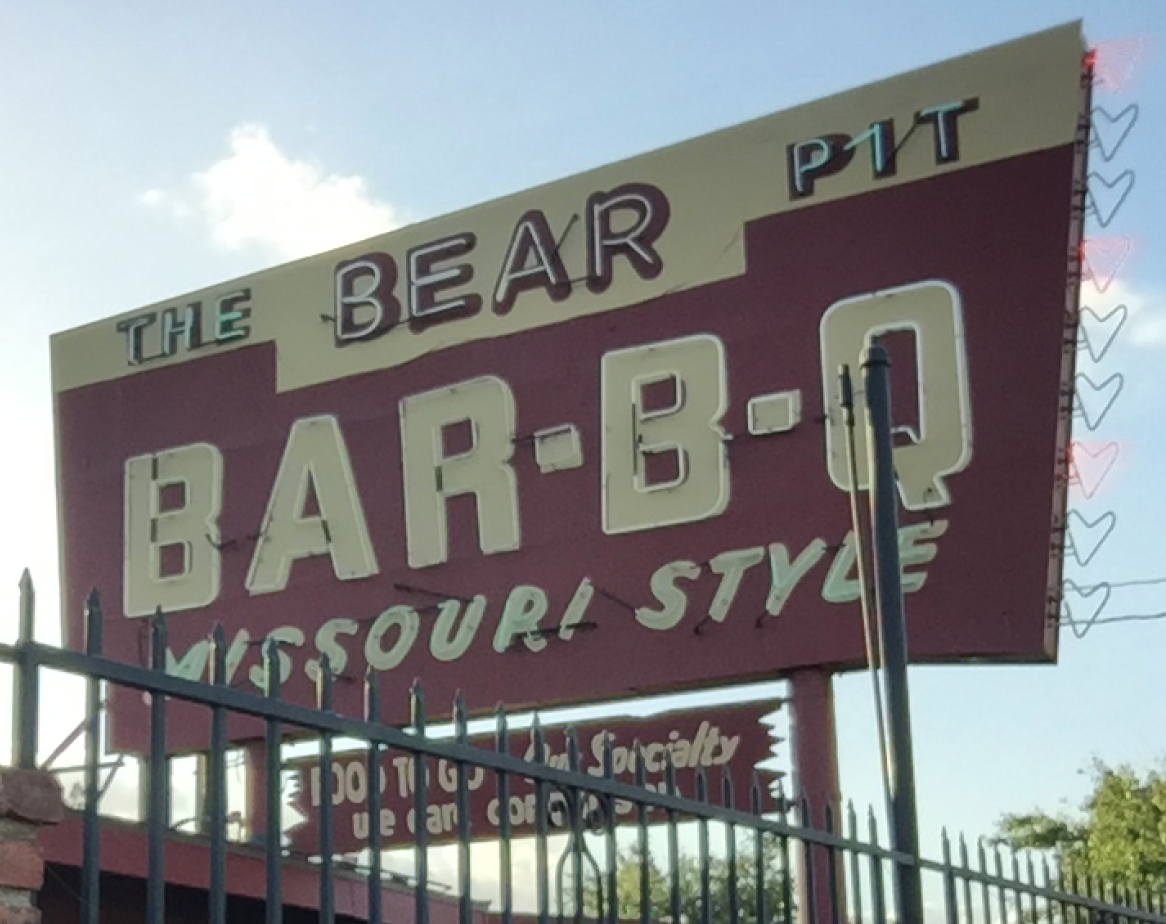
- Neon roadside sign.
- Industry: Barbecue restaurant
- Founded: Late 1940s
- Founder: Ben Baier
- Headquarters: 10825 Sepulveda Blvd., Mission Hills, Los Angeles, California, U.S.
- Owner: Andrew Schatz
- Website: bearpitbbq.com

The Bear Pit Bar-B-Q is a barbecue-based restaurant located in Mission Hills, Los Angeles, California. It was founded in the late 1940s.

== History ==
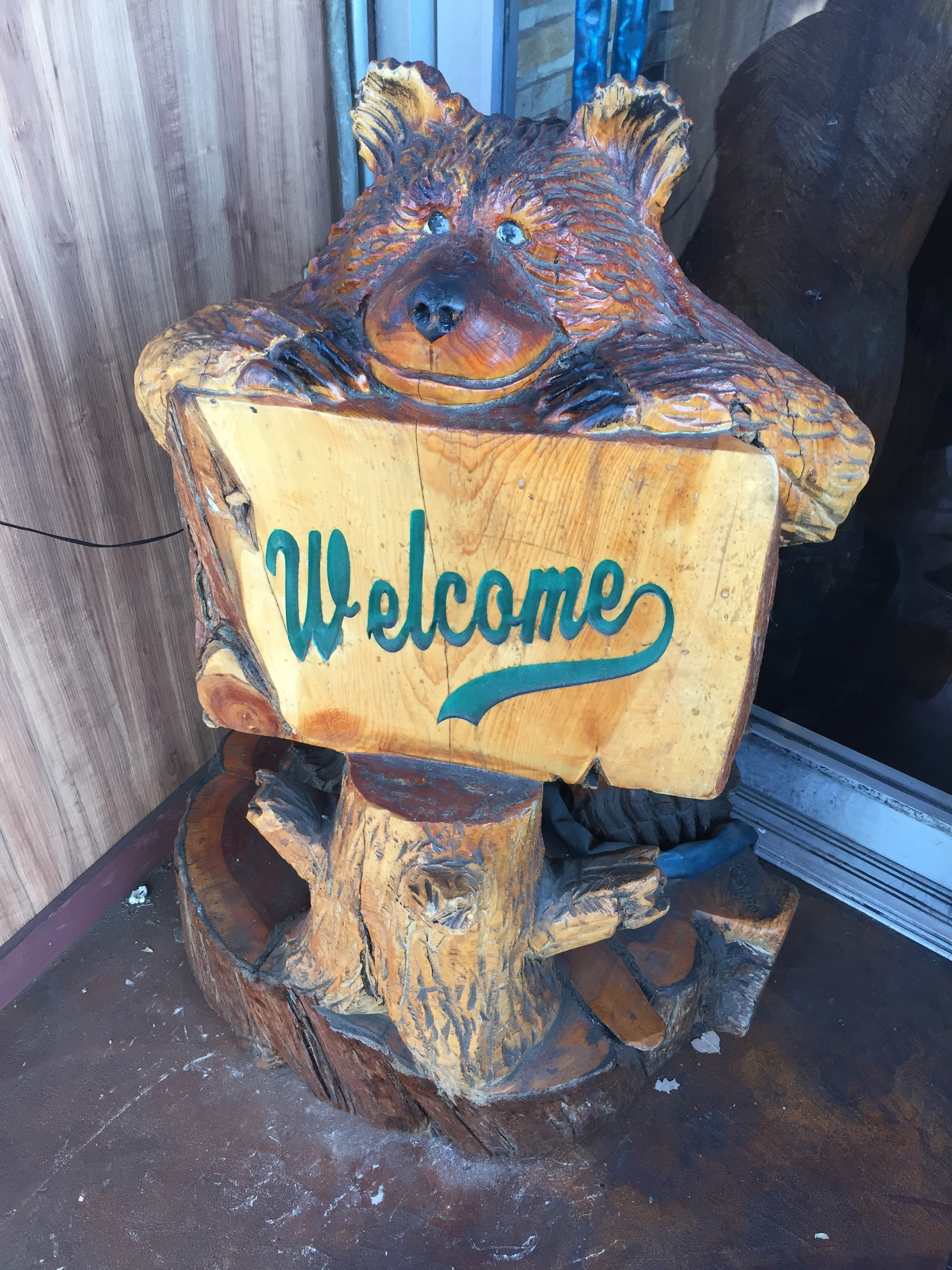
Bear sculpture greets customers at the restaurant entryway

The Bear Pit began as a small shack in Newhall, California after the restaurant's original owner, Ben Baier, moved to California from Missouri. The success of the business led to a new location in what was then called Dennis Park (later Mission Hills). From this location, Baier began a take-out business, partnering with Don Carrow of Carrow's Restaurants, and offering pit-fired, slow-cooked beef, pork, spareribs, and chicken. Vinegar-based coleslaw, garlic bread, and sweet barbecue beans became menu staples.

In the early 1960s, Baier sold the Bear Pit to Ruben and Bea Gordon. The Gordons expanded the enterprise to included two more locations: one in Canoga Park (1966), one in Glendale. In 1976, the Gordons sold the restaurants to Burton and Shirley Schatz. The couple retired in 1988, selling the Canoga Park and Glendale locations and turning the business of the Mission Hills restaurant to their son, Andrew Schatz.

Food critic Jonathan Gold of the Los Angeles Times reviewed the restaurant in 1989.

== Gallery ==
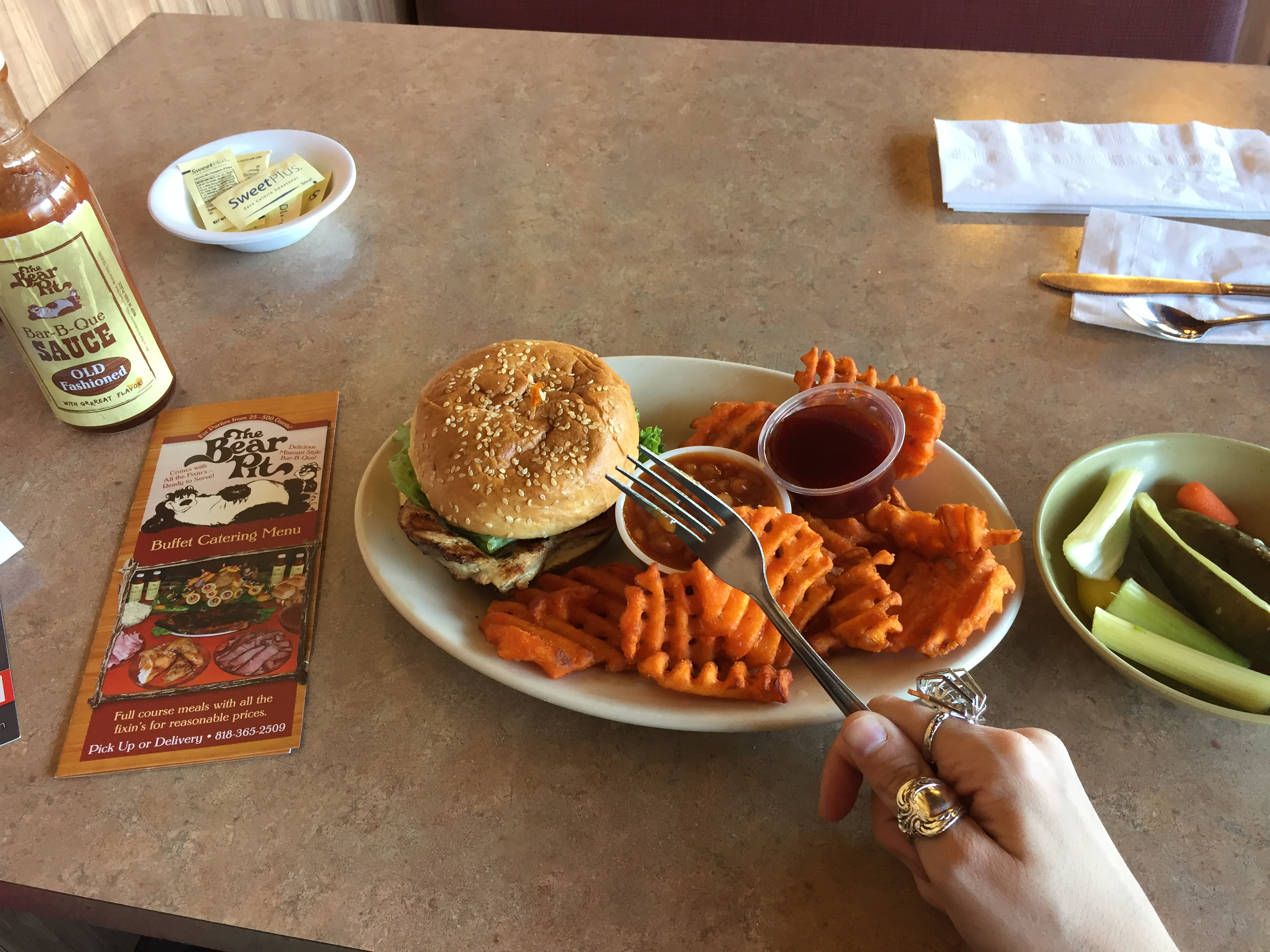
Grilled chicken sandwich and criss-cut sweet potato fries

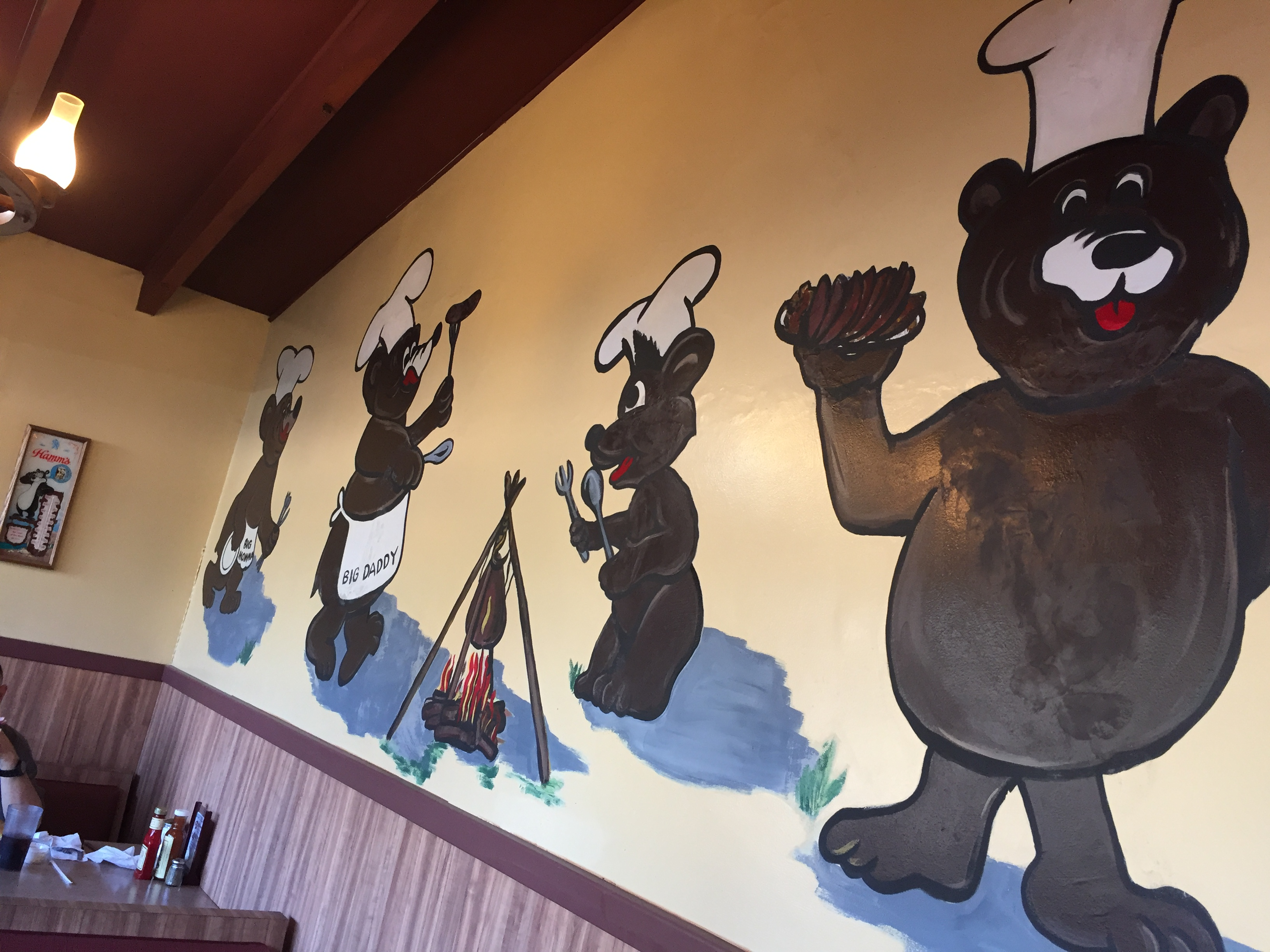
Bear Pit mural
