= Bakers Square =

American restaurant chain

- Type: Subsidiary
- Industry: Restaurants
- Founded: December 1969 (as Mrs. C's, later Poppin' Fresh Pies) - 1983 (as Bakers Square)
- Headquarters: Minnetonka, Minnesota, United States
- Parent: BBQ Holdings, Inc.
- Website: bakerssquare.com

Bakers Square Restaurant & Bakery (also known as Bakers Square) is a casual dining restaurant chain in the United States. Known for its pies, Bakers Square also offers full breakfast, lunch and dinner menus. The chain is owned by BBQ Holdings. As of June 2025, the company operates 7 locations in Illinois, Indiana, Iowa, Minnesota, and Ohio.

== History ==
Bakers Square began in December 1969 with a single restaurant called Mrs. C's in Des Moines, Iowa, that became popular for its pies. Pillsbury purchased Mrs. C's around that time, renamed it Poppin' Fresh Pies, and opened additional locations. VICORP, owners of the Village Inn restaurant chain, purchased Poppin' Fresh Pies from Pillsbury in 1983 and renamed the chain Bakers Square.

== Operations ==
Bakers Square restaurants are primarily located in the Upper Midwest. Except for the Des Moines area, Bakers Square and Village Inn operate in separate markets. The original Mrs. C's restaurant, on Merle Hay Road in Des Moines, remained in business as a Bakers Square until it closed on April 2, 2008, as parent company VICORP filed Chapter 11 bankruptcy. In 2009, American Blue Ribbon Holdings, a company owned by Fidelity National Financial and Newport Global Advisors, acquired the assets of VICORP, including Village Inn and Bakers Square.

In late 1993, VICORP acquired from Eric A. Holm the rights to the small Florida chain Angel's Diner. Holm had also sold the rights to Golden Corral, and VICORP was forced to pay Golden Corral $1 million to secure the exclusive rights. The intent was to convert under-performing Village Inn and Bakers Square units to this new concept. After building seven units, VICORP realized that the concept was not economically viable and wrote off $11M on the venture. During this time, Eric Holm filed for personal bankruptcy.

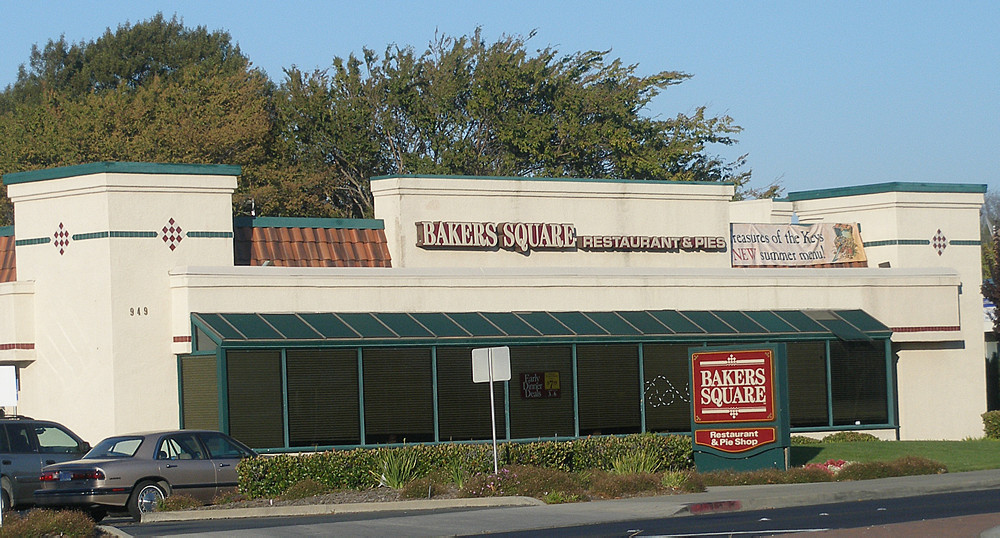
A typical Bakers Square restaurant in Redwood City, California, c. 2005 (since closed and replaced by an In-N-Out)

On April 3, 2008, VICORP filed for bankruptcy under Chapter 11 of the federal bankruptcy code. VICORP closed 56 company-owned restaurants as a result of the move, leaving a total of 343 Village Inn and Bakers Square locations. Village Inn restaurants are found in the Midwest states such as Illinois, Iowa, Wisconsin, Minnesota, Indiana, and Nebraska, the Western United States, Texas, Virginia, and Florida.

Bakers Square once had a large presence in California with over 90 locations and competed directly with Marie Callender's, Coco's Bakery, and Carrows restaurants. Bakers Square entered the California market when its parent company acquired the Sambo's chain in October 1984. Many Sambo's locations were converted to Bakers Square restaurants and the ones that were not were sold to other chains, including Denny's.

VICORP's Bakers Square concept flourished in California through the early 2000s. The declining economy took its toll on the restaurant industry; by 2005 profit margins began to decline. Bakers Square restaurants began closing rural and suburban California locations as leases expired. Those that remained open were not remodeling, as were other chains, and the business continued to decline.

By February 2009, more than 80 California locations had closed. Most locations were shuttered and are vacant today while a few locations around the Los Angeles area converted to Du-par's Restaurant & Bakery or Polly's Pies. The last location in operation in Southern California was in San Diego. This Bakers Square was located on hotel property and was required to continue operations until a new lessee was secured. This was the result of an agreement between VICORP and the hotel chain (formerly Holiday Inn). The location was converted to Du-par's and the connected pub became Du-par's Pub. The restaurant and pub later closed and the property is currently vacant, but there are plans for a Panera Bread to open in its space.

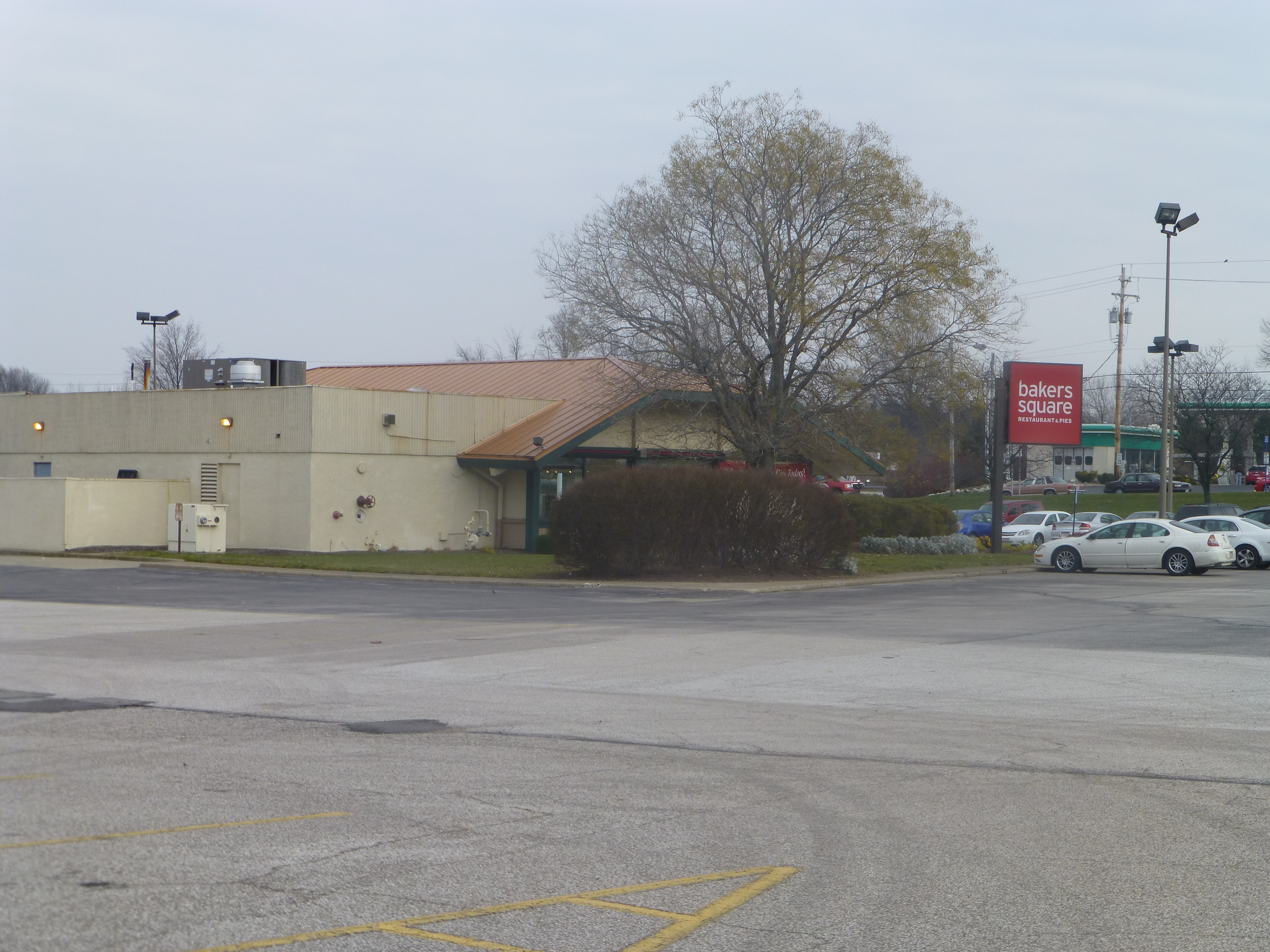
A Bakers Square restaurant in Willoughby Hills, Ohio (closed)

In addition, VICORP closed its Los Angeles County pie production facility in Santa Fe Springs. Two such facilities are still operating in Oak Forest, Illinois, and Chaska, Minnesota. These facilities, formerly VICOM, now "Legendary Baking," produce 18 million pies per year for Bakers Square, Village Inn, and J. Horner's, a food service and retail line.

In March 2009, four Bakers Square locations in the San Francisco Bay Area were acquired by Shari's Restaurants. These continued operating under the Bakers Square name for eight months.

VICORP also ceased operations in Michigan, where it once had a concentration of Bakers Square restaurants.

On January 24, 2020, Bakers Square permanently closed nine locations. Locations closed in Illinois include Alsip, Lansing, Libertyville, Orland Park (La Grange Rd), and Springfield. The Merrillville, IN and North Olmsted, OH locations also closed, along with two locations in Minnesota, those in Brooklyn Park and Eden Prairie.

On January 27, 2020, American Blue Ribbon Holdings, parent company of Bakers Square and Village Inn, filed for Chapter 11 bankruptcy protection after closing 33 locations across both brands.

On September 14, 2020, Bakers Square emerged from bankruptcy protection with 14 locations as a subsidiary of the restructured parent company, VIBSQ Holdings LLC. On December 9, 2020, the company closed its last Wisconsin location, located in Elm Grove.

In July 2021, VIBSQ Holdings was sold to BBQ Holdings, the parent company of Famous Dave's BBQ.
