= Kizer =

Kizer is a Jewish surname from the Netherlands and Ukraine. The surname is derived from the inhabitants of the village of Kizia, Lviv Oblast, Ukraine. Notable people with the surname include:

- Carolyn Kizer (1925–2014), American poet
- DeShone Kizer (born 1996), American football player
- Kenneth Kizer, American businessman
- Lynetta Kizer (born 1990), American basketball player
- Noble Kizer (1900–1940), American football and basketball player
- Rayshaun Kizer (born 1985), American football player
