= Vertos Medical =

Medical device manufacturer

- Type: Private
- Industry: medical devices; health care
- Founded: 2005; 21 years ago
- Founder: Dr. Dave Solsberg; Dr. Don Schomer
- Headquarters: Aliso Viejo, California, United States
- Key people: Eric Wichems; (President and CEO)
- Products: medical devices
- Owner: Stryker Corporation; (2024–present)
- Number of employees: 13(2016)
- Website: www.vertosmed.com

Vertos Medical is a privately held medical device manufacturer that develops, manufactures, and sells surgical instruments to perform minimally invasive procedures intended to treat lumbar spinal stenosis. Founded by Dr. Dave Solsberg and Dr. Don Schomer in 2005, the company is currently headquartered in Aliso Viejo, California.

Vertos Medical's first product allows surgeons to perform a procedure dubbed Minimally Invasive Lumbar Decompression (MILD), a minimally invasive method for lumbar spinal decompression. MILD is market cleared by the U.S. Food and Drug Administration for decompression of the lumbar spine. In March 2017, Vertos Medical won national coverage for its MILD procedure.

On October 1, 2024, the firm was acquired by Stryker Corporation.
