= Carmen Vali-Cave =

First Mayor of Aliso Viejo, California

Carmen Louise Vali-Cave
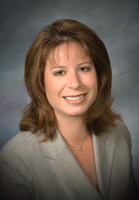

1st Mayor of Aliso Viejo, California
- In office July 1, 2001 – December 31, 2002
- Deputy: Cynthia Pickett
- Preceded by: None
- Succeeded by: Cynthia Adams

4th Mayor Pro Tem of Aliso Viejo, California
- In office January 1, 2005 – December 31, 2005
- Preceded by: Karl Warkomski
- Succeeded by: Cynthia Adams

5th Mayor of Aliso Viejo, California
- In office January 1, 2006 – December 31, 2006
- Deputy: Cynthia Adams
- Preceded by: Karl Warkomski
- Succeeded by: Cynthia Adams

6th Mayor Pro Tem of Aliso Viejo, California
- In office January 1, 2007 – June 6, 2007
- Preceded by: Cynthia Adams
- Succeeded by: Bill Phillips

7th Mayor of Aliso Viejo, California
- In office June 6, 2007 – December 31, 2007
- Deputy: Bill Phillips
- Preceded by: Cynthia Adams
- Succeeded by: Bill Phillips

10th Mayor Pro Tem of Aliso Viejo, California
- In office January 1, 2010 – December 31, 2010
- Preceded by: Phillip B. Tsunoda

11th Mayor of Aliso Viejo, California
- In office January 1, 2011 – December 31, 2011
- Preceded by: Phillip B. Tsunoda
- Succeeded by: Donald Garcia

13th Mayor of Aliso Viejo, California
- In office January 1, 2013 – December 31, 2013
- Deputy: Phillip B. Tsunoda
- Preceded by: Donald Garcia
- Succeeded by: Phillip B. Tsunoda

Personal details
- Born: March 29, 1965 (age 61)

Carmen Louise Vali-Cave (born March 29, 1965) was the first Mayor of Aliso Viejo, California. During times in her career she has also been known as Carmen Vali and Carmen L. Vali.

== City Council ==
Vali-Cave has been a board member for Aliso Viejo Community Association (AVCA). She was the co-founder and president of Aliso Viejo's Cityhood Committee and on July 1, 2001, Aliso Viejo officially became a city whereupon Vali became a member of City Council.

Upon Aliso Viejo's incorporation, Vali-Cave was elected by City Council to serve as the city's first Mayor. She served as the City's Mayor Pro Tem in 2005 under Karl Warkomski and in 2006 she was selected a second time to serve as Mayor. Vali-Cave was re-elected to a second four-year term in 2006, served as the City's Mayor Pro Tem for the first half of 2007 and became Mayor for the latter half of 2007 when Mayor Cynthia Adams resigned.

Vali-Cave serves as Aliso Viejo's alternate board member for El Toro Reuse Planning Authority (ETRPA), board member for the Great Park Advisory Council, Chairwoman for the San Joaquin Transportation Corridor Agency (TCA), and alternate Board Member of the Orange County Fire Authority (OCFA).

Vali-Cave has been the Executive Director for the Lincoln-Juarez Opportunity Center since January 2004. She previously worked as a professional land use planning and development consultant.

Preceded by (none)	Mayor of Aliso Viejo; 2001-2002	Succeeded by Cynthia Adams
Preceded by Karl Warkomski	Mayor Pro Tem of Aliso Viejo; 2005	Succeeded by Cynthia Adams
Preceded by Karl Warkomski	Mayor of Aliso Viejo; 2006	Succeeded by Cynthia Adams
Preceded by Cynthia Adams	Mayor Pro Tem of Aliso Viejo; January 1, 2007–June 6, 2007	Succeeded by Bill Phillips
Preceded by Cynthia Adams	Mayor of Aliso Viejo; June 6, 2007–December 31, 2007	Succeeded by Bill Phillips
Preceded by Phillip Tsunoda	Mayor Pro Tem of Aliso Viejo; January 1, 2010–present	Incumbent
