= List of mayors of Aliso Viejo, California =

Mayor of the City of Aliso Viejo
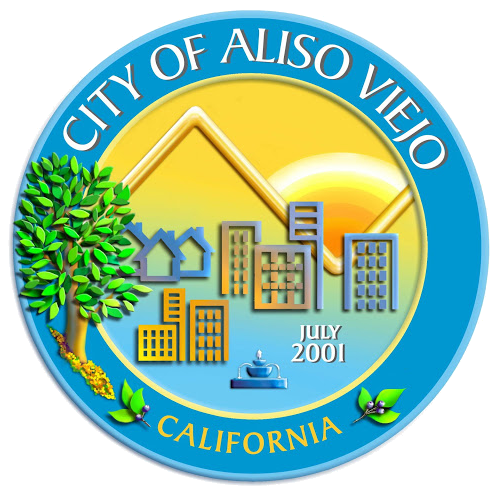
- Seal of the City of Aliso Viejo
- Incumbent; Tiffany Ackley since January 1, 2021
- Formation: July 1, 2001
- First holder: Carmen Vali-Cave

This is a list of mayors of Aliso Viejo in Orange County, California — since its incorporation in 2001.

== List ==
#	Image	Name	Took office	Left office	Mayor Pro Tem
Mayors of the City of Aliso Viejo; The City of Aliso Viejo was incorporated by act of the California State Legislature on July 1, 2001.
1		Carmen Vali-Cave	July 1, 2001	December 31, 2002	Cynthia Pickett
2		Cynthia Adams	January 1, 2003	December 31, 2003	William A. "Bill" Phillips
3		William A. "Bill" Phillips	January 1, 2004	December 31, 2004	Karl Warkomski
4		Karl Warkomski	January 1, 2005	December 31, 2005	Carmen Vali-Cave
5		Carmen Vali-Cave	January 1, 2006	December 31, 2006	Cynthia Adams
6		Cynthia Adams	January 1, 2007	May 13, 2007	Carmen Vali-Cave
Vacant		May 13, 2007	June 6, 2007		Carmen Vali-Cave
7		Carmen Vali-Cave	June 6, 2007	December 31, 2007	William A. "Bill" Phillips
8		William A. "Bill" Phillips	January 1, 2008	December 31, 2008	
9		Donald Garcia	January 1, 2009	December 31, 2009	Phillip B. Tsunoda
10		Phillip B. Tsunoda	January 1, 2010	December 31, 2010	Carmen Vali-Cave
11		Carmen Vali-Cave	January 1, 2011	December 31, 2011	
12		Donald Garcia	January 1, 2012	December 31, 2012	William A. "Bill" Phillips
13		Carmen Vali-Cave	January 1, 2013	December 31, 2013	Phillip B. Tsunoda
14		Phillip B. Tsunoda	January 1, 2014	December 31, 2014	William A. "Bill" Phillips
15		William A. "Bill" Phillips	January 1, 2015	December 31, 2015	Mike Munzing
16		Mike Munzing	January 1, 2016	December 31, 2016	Dave Harrington
17		Dave Harrington	January 1, 2017	December 31, 2017	Phillip B. Tsunoda
17		Dave Harrington	January 1, 2018	December 31, 2019	Ross Chun
18		Mike Munzing	January 1, 2020	Incumbent	Tiffany Ackley
19		Tiffany Ackley	January 1, 2021		

== History of city council ==
When Aliso Viejo was first incorporated as a city in 2001, five city council members were elected to serve terms. Carmen Vali was chosen to serve as the city's first mayor because she was instrumental in getting the city incorporated; and Cynthia Pickett was chosen to serve as the city's mayor pro tem. Both were reelected in November 2006 to terms ending in 2010. Both women later married during their terms, with Carmen Vali becoming Carmen Vali-Cave and Cynthia Pickett becoming Cynthia Adams.

Also elected in 2001 were Bill Phillips, Karl Warkomski, and Greg Ficke. Each of these candidates were re-elected to serve on City Council in 2004 to terms ending in 2008.

A new mayor is selected from the five city council members each year.

So far, Ficke is the only member of the original council to never have served as mayor, while Cynthia Adams and Carmen Vali-Cave are the only original members to have served as mayor for more than one term. Until Warkomski's resignation in February 2007 and Adams's resignation three months later, all five current city council members had been the only five to have served on city council since the city's incorporation.
