= Shari's Cafe & Pies =

US restaurant chain

- Type: Private
- Industry: Foodservice
- Founded: 1978; 48 years ago Hermiston, Oregon, U.S.
- Headquarters: Beaverton, Oregon, U.S.
- Key people: Samuel Borgese (CEO)
- Revenue: $121.4 million (2023)
- Owner: Gather Holdings
- Subsidiaries: Coco's Bakery
- Website: sharis.com
- Footnotes; Company data.

Shari's Cafe & Pies, originally known as Shari's Restaurants, is a chain of family dining restaurants in the western United States. Known for their house-made pies, Shari's also offers a full breakfast, lunch, and dinner menu. Shari's is known for their familiar hexagonal building design. As of November 2026, Shari's has 8 locations: 2 in California, 2 in Idaho, and 4 in Washington. In 1999, Shari's had 96 locations across five western states plus Nebraska.

== History ==
Shari's logo (2003–2011)

Shari's began in Hermiston, Oregon, in 1978 with Ron and Sharon "Shari" Bergquist as proprietors. The two ran the company for seven years. By 1999, Shari's was the ninth-largest family restaurant chain in the United States based on total sales, and sixth in growth.

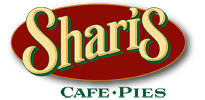
Shari's logo from 2011.

In March 1999, the chain was acquired by Fairmont Capital Inc. for $60 million. At that time Shari's operated 96 locations in seven states with 4,000 employees and $128 million in annual revenue. They were still the ninth largest family chain in 2003.

Shari's lost a gender discrimination lawsuit in April 2005 and was ordered to pay $122,225 in damages. In December 2005, the company was purchased by New York private investment firm Circle Peak Capital.

President Larry Curtis retired in July 2008 after 24 years with Shari's and was succeeded by Bruce MacDiarmid. In 2009, Shari's Restaurants took ownership of a number of northern California Baker's Square restaurants and converted them to operate under Shari's name.

As of 2017, chain has been operated by Shari's Management Corporation in Beaverton. At that time, most, but not all locations are open 24 hours a day, with a focus on specialty pies. Samuel Borgese was named CEO in September 2017, replacing MacDiarmid. In mid-2017, the company was operating 95 locations in the states of California, Idaho, Nebraska, Oregon, Washington, and Wyoming, just one fewer than in the year 2000. Shari's previously operated several restaurants in Colorado, Utah, Arizona, and Texas. However, the company permanently closed all locations in those four states sometime between the mid-1990s and the early 2000s due to poor management. During the 2020s, operations ceased in Nebraska and Wyoming as well.

In September 2018, it was announced that Shari's Cafe & Pies had taken over Carrows and Coco's Bakery.

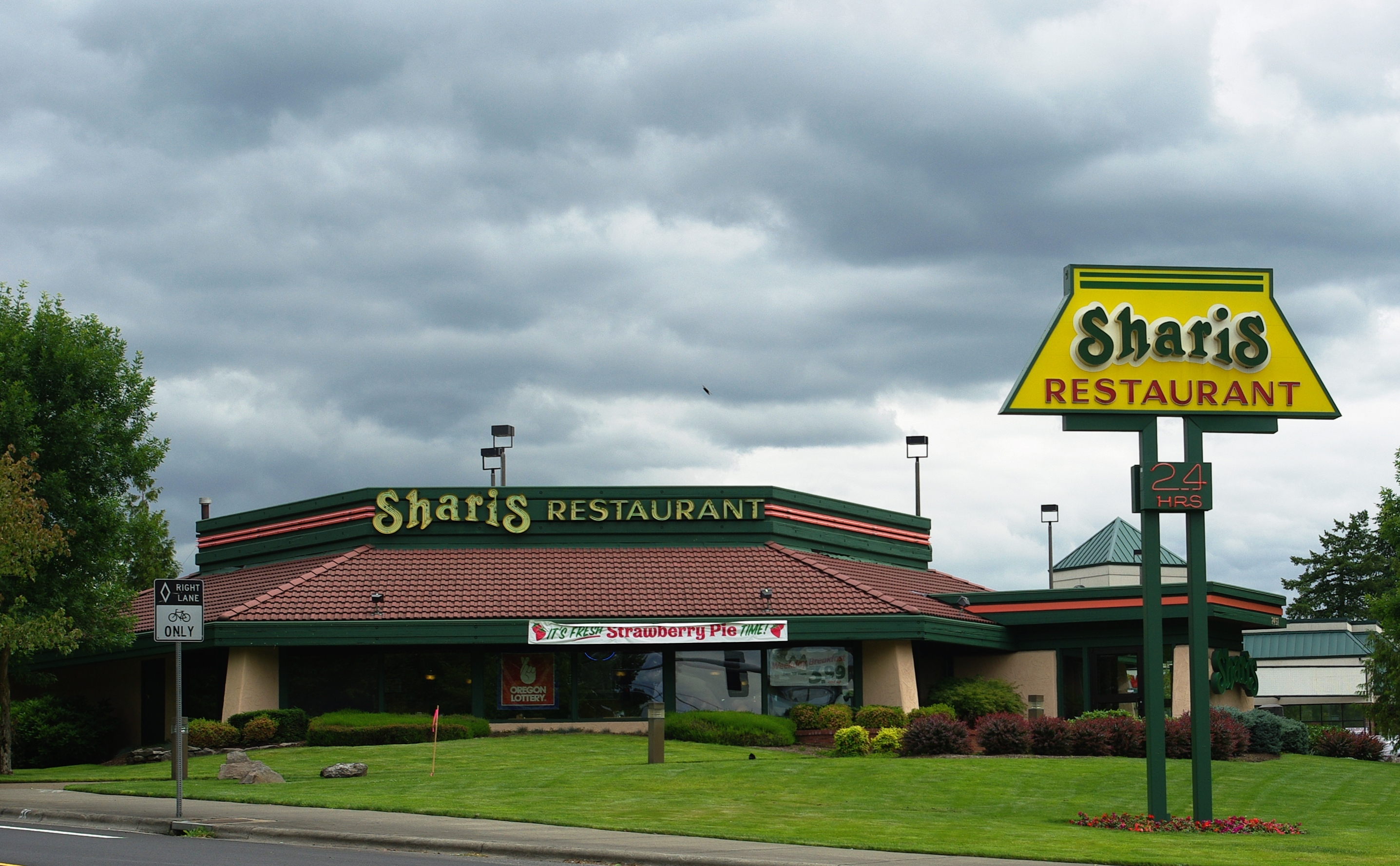
Location in Garden Home, Oregon in 2009. (Now closed)

In August 2024, it was announced that Shari's Cafe & Pies has been behind on payments for both property, taxes and services rendered for the restaurant chain. As a result, a large number of Shari's locations permanently closed. By early October 2024, the number of locations had declined to 49, operating in California, Oregon, Washington and Idaho. In late October, all Oregon locations closed abruptly, dropping the remaining number of locations to 17. At the time, the Oregon Lottery reported that Shari's owed around $900,000 of revenues from their video lottery machines, and sent the debt to collections in February 2025 after the company failed to pay or respond.

In 2025, a regional chain restaurant called Elmer's announced it was taking over four former Shari's location in Oregon.

In May 2026, Lena Brands, the parent company of Shari's Cafe & Pies, filed for Chapter 11 bankruptcy protection, listing assets and liabilities between $1 million and $10 million.

== See also ==
- List of casual dining restaurant chains
- List of diners
- List of restaurant chains in the United States
- Cuisine of the United States
