= Marc Maiffret =

American computer security expert

- Born: November 28, 1980 (age 45); Aliso Viejo, California, U.S.
- Occupation: Computer hacker/security expert
- Employer: BeyondTrust
- Title: Chief Technology Officer
- Website: www.beyondtrust.com www.marcmaiffret.com

Marc Maiffret is the Chief Technology Officer at BeyondTrust, a security and compliance management company. Maiffret joined BeyondTrust by way of their acquisition of eEye Digital Security, which he co-founded in 1998 along with Firas Bushnaq. Maiffret created one of the first Vulnerability Management and Web Application Firewall products, which to date, have been deployed worldwide and won numerous product awards. Maiffret is credited with discovering some of the first major vulnerability discoveries in Microsoft software and leads BeyondTrust's Advanced Research Labs, responsible for identifying new trends in enterprise security for the benefit of the BeyondTrust product roadmap. Maiffret left eEye for a three-year period, during which he served as Chief Security Architect at FireEye. He returned to eEye in July 2010.

During his brief time away from eEye, Maiffret also founded Invenio Security, which he eventually merged with veteran consulting firm The DigiTrust Group. At DigiTrust, Maiffret managed the company's Professional Services division, including network security consulting and managed security services. Maiffret is also responsible for helping expand the firm's internal research and development efforts.

Maiffret is known for running eEye's top security research team for nearly 10 years and at present, as well as discovering some critical Microsoft security vulnerabilities, such as Code Red.

Maiffret has accepted three invitations to testify before the United States Congress on matters of national cybersecurity and critical security threats posed to both public and private infrastructures. He was named one of People (magazine) Magazine's 30 People Under 30 and has been featured for cover stories in Details, the Los Angeles Times, Entrepreneur magazine, and USA Today in addition to numerous television appearances. Maiffret was featured in MTV's True Life: I'm a Hacker (October 1999). Marc was a guest speaker on episode 91 of Security Now, with Leo Laporte and Steve Gibson. Influential in his industry, Marc has spoken at a variety of conferences (including ISSA Los Angeles and InfoSec 2011) and has been featured in several publications including CNN, Fox News, Security Week, SC Magazine, PC World, and Computer World.

Marc was 'Chameleon' in the hacking group 'Rhino9'.

Marc was also known as 'sn1per' in the hacking group No|d.

On August 22, 2013, Yahoo News reported that Maiffret was prompting hackers to support in raising a $10,000 reward for Khalil Shreateh. On August 20, Maiffret stated that he had already raised $9,000 in his efforts, including the $2,000 he himself contributed. He and other hackers alike denounced Facebook for its actions. Maiffret said: "He is sitting there in Palestine doing this research on a five-year-old laptop that looks like it is half broken. It's something that might help him out in a big way."
