= Metagenics =

The word metagenics uses the prefix meta and the suffix gen. Literally, it means "the creation of something which creates". In the context of biotechnology, metagenics is the practice of engineering organisms to create a specific enzyme, protein, or other biochemical from simpler starting materials. The genetic engineering of E. coli with the specific task of producing human insulin from starting amino acids is an example. E. coli has also been engineered to digest plant biomass and use it to produce hydrocarbons in order to synthesize biofuels. The applications of metagenics on E. coli also include higher alcohols, fatty-acid based chemicals and terpenes.

== Biofuels ==
The depletion of petroleum sources and increase in greenhouse gas emissions in the twenty and twenty-first centuries has been the driving factor behind the development of biofuels from microorganisms. E. coli is currently regarded as the best option for biofuel production because of the amount of knowledge available about its genome. The process converts biomass into fuels, and has proven successful on an industrial scale, with the United States having produced 6.4 billion gallons of bioethanol in 2007. Bioethenol is currently the front-runner for alternative fuel production and uses S.cerevisiae and Zymomonas mobilis to create ethanol through fermentation. However, maximum productivity is limited due to the fact that these organisms cannot use pentose sugars, leading to consideration of E.coli and Clostridia. E.coli is capable of producing ethanol under anaerobic conditions through metabolizing glucose into two moles of formate, two moles of acetate, and one mole of ethanol. While bioethanol has proved to be a successful alternative fuel source on an industrial scale, it also has its shortcomings, namely, its low energy density, high vapor pressure, and hygroscopicity. Current alternatives to bioethanol include biobutanol, biodiesel, propanol, and synthetic hydrocarbons. The most common form of biodiesels is fatty acid methyl esters and current synthesis strategies involve transesterification of triacylglycerols from plant oils. However, plant oils have a major limitation in availability of oil-seed supplies at competitive prices, leading to an interest in direct synthesis of fatty acid methyl esters in bacteria. This process bypasses transesterification, leading to higher energy yields and lower production cost. One of the principal obstacles in production of viable biofuels is that the maximum blend ratio of biofuel to petroleum is between 10% and 20%, Current biofuels are not compatible with high-performance, low-emission engines and costly changes in infrastructure and engine remodeling would be required. A University of Exeter study sought to overcome this obstacle through production of biofuels that can replace current fossil fuels through sustainable means, namely, the production of n-alkanes, iso-alkanes, and n-alkenes, as these are the hydrocarbons that compose current retail transport fuels. The study found suitable substrates for production of the aforementioned hydrocarbons by means of the P. luminescens fatty acid reductase (FAR) complex. A study published in Biotechnology for Biofuels used S. cerevisiae to produce short- and branched-chain alkyl esters biodiesel through metabolic engineering. Negative regulators for the INO1 gene, Rpd3 and Opi1 were deleted to boost S. cerevisiae's ability to produce fatty acid esters. To increase the production of alcohol precursors, five isobutanol pathway enzymes were overexpressed.

== Insulin Production ==
Increase in the demand for recombinant insulin can be explained by an increase in the number of diabetic patients globally, as well as alternative delivery methods such as inhalation and oral routes, which require higher doses. Through the use of recombinant DNA technology, E. coli can be used for the production of human insulin. The biosynthesis of insulin within the human body confers a significant advantage over bovine or porcine synthesis, which are often immunogenic in diabetic patients. To accomplish this, synthetic genes for human insulin are fused with the β-galactosidase gene of E.coli, where they undergo transcription and ultimately translation into proteins. The limiting factor for the use of microorganisms like E. coli in biosynthesis of gene products like insulin is time, yet due to advancements in the synthesis of oligonucleotides and liquid chromatography, the production time needed for DNA fragments has greatly decreased. Recombinant human insulin was first approved for clinical trials in 1980. At this time the A and B chains of insulin were produced separately and then chemically joined. Joining of the two chains was often carried out through air oxidation with low efficiency. A 1978 study by Goedell et al. successfully accomplished correct joining of the A and B chains through S-sulfonated derivatives and an excess of the A chain, resulting in 50-80% correct joining. Recent advances have allowed the chains to be synthesized together by inserting the human proinsulin gene into E. coli cells, which produce proinsulin through fermentation.
