= Nimbus Data =

American computer data storage software

- Type: Private
- Industry: Cloud computing Computer data storage
- Founded: 2003
- Headquarters: Irvine, California, U.S.
- Key people: Thomas Isakovich (CEO)
- Website: nimbusdata.com

Nimbus Data is an American computer data storage software and systems company.

== Company ==
Nimbus Data develops flash memory solutions. Customers include eBay, Walt Disney Animation Studios, Digital River, Raytheon, Citrix Systems, Lockheed Martin, WWE, and DreamWorks. The company was rumored to have deals with Apple Inc. and Thomson Reuters. The privately held company is led by CEO and founder Thomas Isakovich.

== Products ==
In April 2010, Nimbus Data announced the S-Class system, a multi-protocol all-flash array with up to 100 TB of solid state storage supporting Ethernet, Fibre Channel, and InfiniBand networks.

In January 2012, Nimbus Data announced the E-Class system. It offers redundant controllers and up to 500 TB of solid-state storage. Each controller supports the same interfaces: Ethernet, Fibre Channel, and InfiniBand. Nimbus Data software detects controller and path failures, providing failover as well as online software updates and online capacity expansion.

In August 2012, Nimbus Data announced the Gemini system, with an available 10-year warranty. Gemini includes dual controllers for no single point of failure and non-disruptive software updates. In a 2U form factor, the Gemini array supports 48 TB of capacity, 1 million IOps, 12 GB/s, and less than 0.1 ms latency. Certified benchmark results of over 4,032 simultaneous virtual desktop (VDI) users has been achieved on a single Gemini system.

In August 2013, Nimbus Data announced the Gemini F400 and F600 systems with increased performance of up to 2 million read IOps at less than 0.05 ms latency (4 KB block I/O rates). Nimbus Data's HALO software, embedded in its flash memory systems, handles both block storage (storage area network) and file systems (network attached storage) by supporting several protocols. Data management features include thin provisioning, automatic capacity reclamation, encryption, replication, snapshots, inline deduplication, compression, and automatic self-healing capabilities.

In August 2016, Nimbus Data unveiled a new all-flash array platform called ExaFlash.

In August 2017, Nimbus Data launched ExaDrive, a software-defined multiprocessor SSD architecture.

In March 2018, Nimbus Data launched the world's highest capacity and most energy-efficient solid state drive, the ExaDrive DC100, at 100 terabytes.

In May 2020, Nimbus Data unveiled a new solid state storage-optimized operating system called AFX. Nimbus Data AFX supports over a dozen block, file, and object storage protocols on one platform, with fine-grain QoS controls to optimize storage behavior for specific workloads. The company also announced a new all-flash storage array called ExaFlash One and a new support subscription program called Tectonic.

In August 2020, Nimbus Data launched the ExaDrive NL series SSD, the world's highest capacity QLC flash SSD (at 64 TB), as well as the world's first QLC flash SAS SSD.

In January 2026, Nimbus Data announced that it had achieved five consecutive years of profitability and opened a new presence in Miami, Florida.

In February 2026, Nimbus Data announced FlashMax, a next-generation multiprotocol all-flash array for enterprise and cloud-scale infrastructure.
