= Carrows =

US restaurant chain

- Type: Restaurants
- Industry: Restaurants, Casual Dining
- Founded: 1970; 56 years ago as Carrows Hickory Chip Restaurant
- Founder: David G. Nancarrow
- Defunct: June 28, 2023; 3 years ago
- Parent: Shari's Management Corporation

Carrows was a subsidiary of Shari's Cafe & Pies and casual dining restaurant that served breakfast and lunch/dinner in California, United States.

== History ==
Carrows was started by David G. Nancarrow in Santa Clara, California, in 1970 as the Carrows Hickory Chip Restaurant. In late 1993, its parent company filed for Chapter 11 bankruptcy. Carrows and its sister chain Coco's Bakery Restaurants were purchased by Advantica Restaurant Group in 1996, which would file for bankruptcy the following year. In 2002 they were acquired by Catalina Restaurant Group, Inc.

In California, Carrows/Coco's Bakery competed directly with Marie Callender's and Bakers Square restaurants.

In 2006, Catalina Restaurant Group was bought by Japanese company Zensho Co., Ltd., which has operated Coco's Japan for many years.

In 2015, Food Management Partners acquired Catalina Restaurant Group Inc., (parent of Coco's and Carrows).

In September 2018, it was announced that Shari's Cafe & Pies had taken over Carrows and Coco's.

On June 28, 2023, Carrows has shuttered its restaurant in Cerritos due to the company's retirement.

In May 2026, Lena Brands, the parent company of Carrows, filed for Chapter 11 bankruptcy protection, listing assets and liabilities between $1 million and $10 million.
