= Kenneth Kizer =

Kenneth W. Kizer is the CEO of Medsphere Systems, a technology company in Aliso Viejo, California. Previously he served as the Under Secretary for Health in the United States Department of Veterans Affairs and is widely credited as the chief architect responsible for the vast improvement in the VA healthcare delivery system in the 1990s. In 2009, Kizer was elected as a fellow of the National Academy of Public Administration.
