= Harperman =

Protest song

Harperman is a 2015 protest song about Stephen Harper, then the Prime Minister of Canada. It was written by Anthony (Tony) Turner, an Ottawa folksinger who worked as a government scientist at Environment Canada, studying migratory birds.

== Issues referenced ==
The following issues are referenced, in the order that they appear in the song.

- Harper's controlling attitude
- Canadian Senate expenses scandal, especially concerning Mike Duffy
- Environmental policy of Canada
- Cuts to the Canadian Broadcasting Corporation
- Veterans
- Beverley McLachlin
- Prorogation of parliament, especially during the 2008-09 parliamentary dispute
- Missing and Murdered Indigenous Women
- Fair Elections Act
- Refusal to listen to, and silencing of, scientists
- Labeling people "terrorists"
- Suppressing freedom of the press
- Tough stance on crime
- Oil sands
- Omnibus bills

== Background ==
Turner worked by day in habitat planning at Environment Canada, where he was coordinating a project to map priority areas for migratory birds. In March 2015, the 62-year-old Turner entered a songwriting contest, where he was given a choice between "a song of hope or a song of protest." With a federal election approaching, he chose the latter and won the contest. Turner was inspired by an article in JUSTnews, the newsletter of the Canadian Unitarians for Social Justice, which listed a dozen ways the Harper government had, in its view, attacked democracy. Turner added to the list and created a nine-verse song that was recorded on 12 June. Turner was backed by members of various community choirs, social action groups and concerned citizens. The video was posted to YouTube on the 22nd, where it has been widely viewed.

== Reaction ==
On August 10, Turner was suspended with pay. The song was deemed to violate the code of neutrality that civil servants were expected to follow. Turner, who was close to retirement, decided to retire rather than wait out an investigation. However, the song caught on the popular mood, and on September 17 a cross-country sing-along was held in dozens of cities as well a large rally on Parliament Hill.
