= Coco's Bakery =

U.S. casual dining restaurant chain

- Type: Subsidiary
- Industry: Restaurant
- Genre: Bakeries
- Founded: 1948; 78 years ago
- Founder: John and Audrey McIntosh
- Headquarters: Beaverton, Oregon
- Products: Food
- Parent: Shari's Management Corporation
- Website: www.cocosbakery.com

Coco's Bakery is a subsidiary chain of Shari's Cafe & Pies and casual dining restaurants operating in the western United States. As of October 2024, the company operates 2 locations in California. It began as The Snack Shop in 1948 in Corona del Mar, California, and had switched owners multiple times.

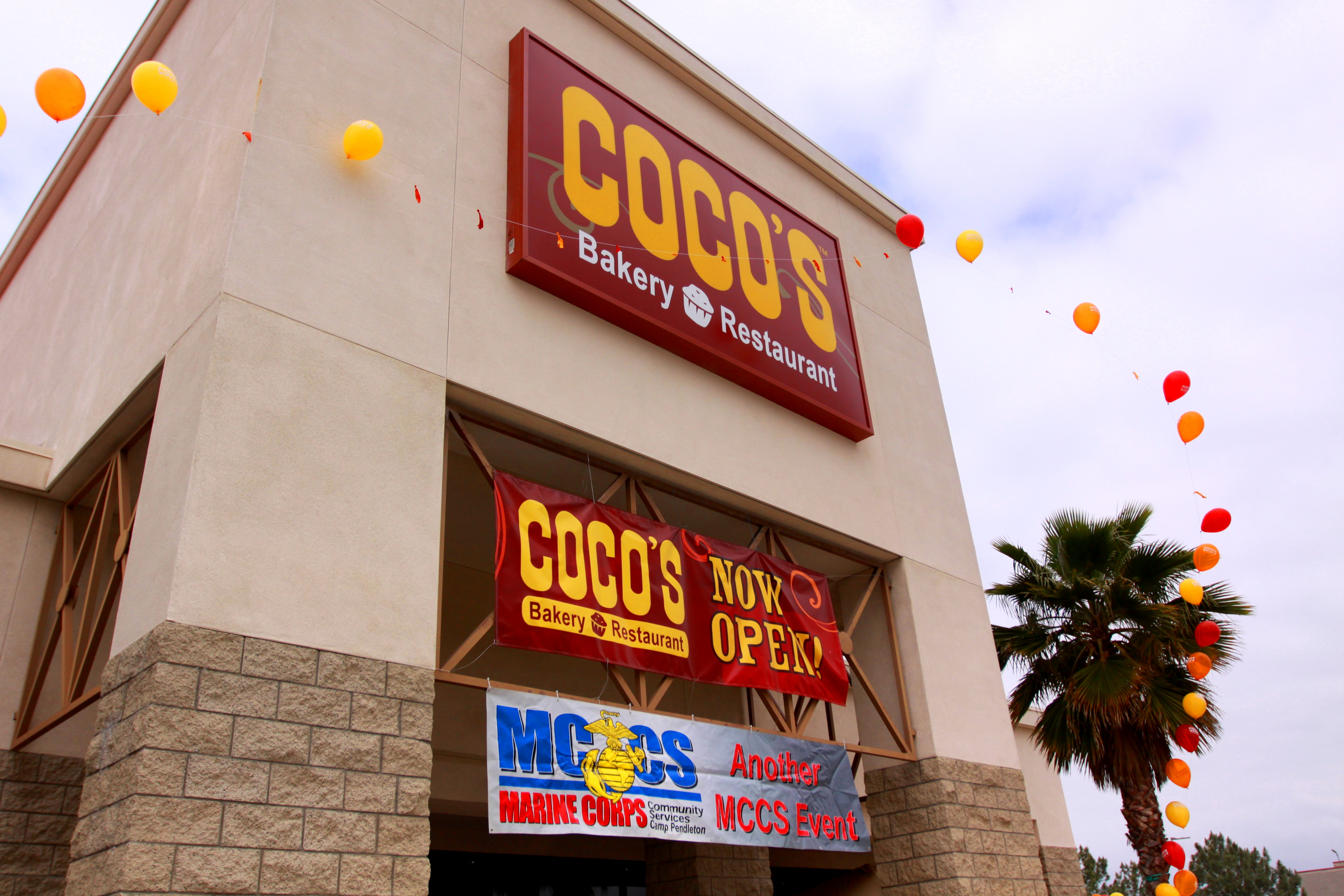
A Coco's Bakery Restaurant at Camp Pendleton in 2010

== History ==
In 1948, The Snack Shop along the Pacific Coast Highway in Corona del Mar, California, was purchased by John and Audrey McIntosh. John and Audrey decided to purchase the restaurant after he had worked there for two weeks. In partnership with his brother-in-law Bill McIntyre, they grew the Snack Shop concept to many more units and then in 1960 expanded the business into Reuben's in Newport Beach. Then in 1965 they expanded the Snack Shop concept to Coco's and the Reuben E. Lee, ultimately converting all Snack Shops to Coco's. As the name implies, the bakery-restaurants feature pies. After the conversion of the Snack Shops to Coco's locations, as well the newly expanded Reuben's steakhouse franchise that were co-located on Coco's properties, the entire operation was sold to W. R. Grace and Company, a New York chemical conglomerate, as part of its Restaurant Services Division. During this period of Grace ownership, Grace also added local Mexican restaurant chain El Torito, Carrows and others.

After years of poor performance, W. R. Grace spun off 145 restaurant locations in a leveraged buyout to Restaurant Enterprises Group, a company composed of Grace managers. In late 1993, its parent company filed for Chapter 11 bankruptcy.

On May 24, 1996, Coco's and Carrows were later sold to Flagstar, the parent company of Denny's. On July 12, 1997, Flagstar filed for Chapter 11 bankruptcy.

On February 15, 2001, Coco's and Carrows new owners, FRD Acquisition Co., filed for Chapter 11 bankruptcy.

In 2002, Coco's, along with its sister chain Carrows, was purchased by Catalina Restaurant Group, headquartered in Carlsbad, California. In 2006, Catalina Restaurant Group was bought by Japanese company Zensho Co., Ltd., which has operated Coco's Japan for many years.

In 2015 San Antonio, Texas-based Food Management Partners acquired Carlsbad, California-based Catalina Restaurant Group Inc., parent of the Coco's and Carrows concepts, from Zensho Co., Ltd. See also ココスジャパン (Coco's Japan Co., Ltd).

In September 2018, it was announced that Shari's Cafe & Pies had taken over Carrows and Coco's.

In May 2026, Lena Brands, the parent company of Coco's Bakery, filed for Chapter 11 bankruptcy protection, listing assets and liabilities between $1 million and $10 million.
