= Village Inn =

Casual dining restaurant chain

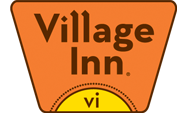
- Type: Subsidiary
- Industry: Restaurant; Bakery
- Genre: casual dining
- Predecessor: Village Inn Pancake House (1958-1989)
- Founded: 1958; 68 years ago Denver, Colorado
- Founder: James Mola; Merton Anderson
- Headquarters: Minnetonka, Minnesota, United States
- Products: Breakfast foods, steaks, chicken, seafood, burgers, sandwiches, soups, salads, desserts, beverages
- Revenue: $37,000,000
- Parent: BBQ Holdings
- Website: www.villageinn.com

Village Inn is a casual-dining restaurant chain in the United States. Its restaurants are known for their breakfast menu items. Also, they feature a variety of salads, sandwiches, burgers, melts, and dinner items. Their pies have won numerous awards from the American Pie Council.

As of April 2024, the company operates 116 locations in Alaska, Arizona, Arkansas, Colorado, Florida, Illinois, Iowa, Kansas, Minnesota, Missouri, Nebraska, New Mexico, Oklahoma, Texas, Utah, Virginia, Washington, and Wyoming. In September 2015, Village Inn operated 212 restaurants. This was reduced in bankruptcy proceedings, leading to sale of the chain in July 2021 to Village Inn's new parent company, BBQ Holdings, Inc., based in Minnetonka, Minnesota.

== History ==
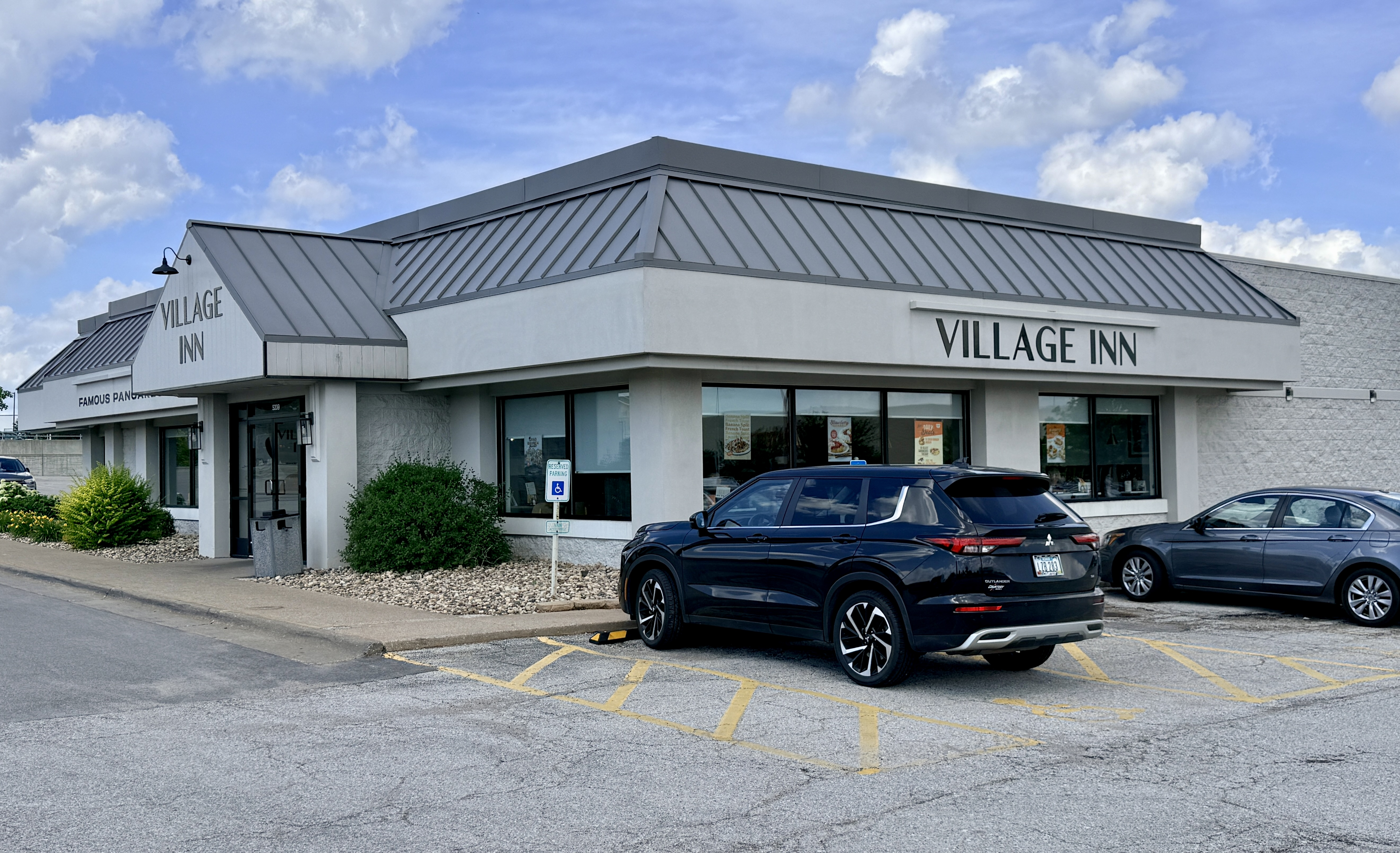
Elmore Avenue location in Davenport, Iowa

Village Inn was founded by James Mola and Merton Anderson, who opened the first Village Inn Pancake House in Denver in 1958 at 8855 East Colfax Avenue. They incorporated as Village Inn Pancake House, Inc., in December 1959, and began franchising in 1961, with Dow Sherwood opening the first franchised locations in Tampa, Florida. In 1982, Village Inn became the publicly traded Vicorp Restaurants, Inc. Vicorp acquired the Poppin' Fresh Pies chain from Pillsbury in May 1983, renaming it Bakers Square.

In 1984, Vicorp acquired 71 restaurants from Ralston Purina's Continental Restaurant Systems division and 175 former Sambo's restaurants in California, Florida, and Arizona. The California locations were converted to Bakers Square restaurants, while the Florida and Arizona locations were converted to Village Inns, but the conversions led to a decline in profits for the company and 15 of the converted Florida locations closed by 1989.

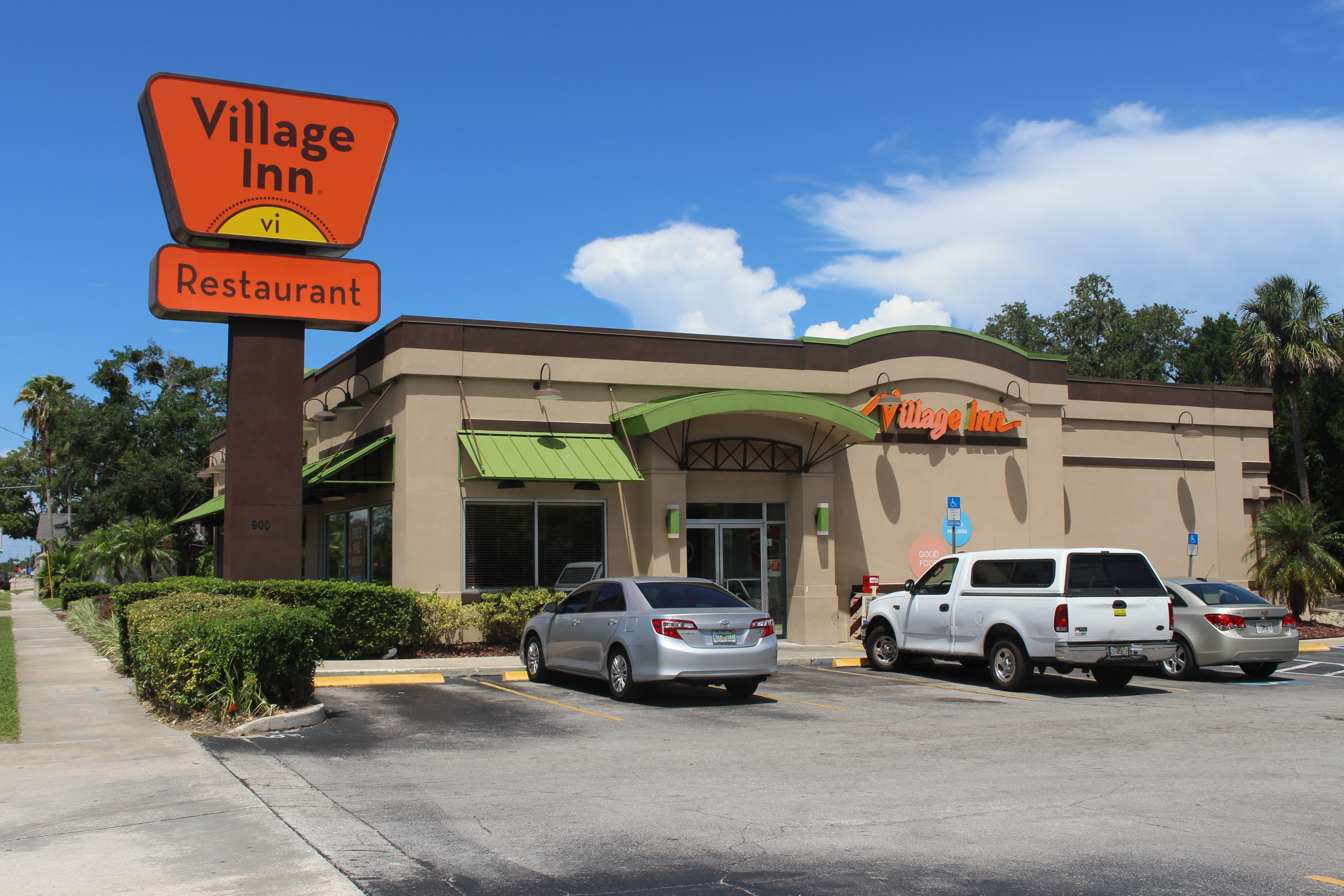
Restaurant in St. Augustine, Florida

By the end of the 1980s, "Pancake House" was dropped from the name of the chain as Village Inn began offering lunch and dinner menus in addition to breakfast. During the early 1990s, all Village Inn restaurants underwent a large-scale renovation that featured new green mansard roofs and neon signage. In May 2001, the investment firms of Goldner, Hawn, Johnson, and Morrison, Inc., and BancBoston Capital acquired Vicorp, and the company has been privately held ever since.

In late 1993, Vicorp acquired the rights to a small Florida chain called Angel's Diner from founder Eric A. Holm. Unfortunately, he had also sold the rights to Golden Corral and Vicorp was forced to pay Golden Corral $1 million to secure the exclusive rights. The intent was to convert underperforming Village Inn and Bakers Square] units to this new concept. After building seven units, Vicorp realized that the concept was not economically viable and wrote off $11 million on the venture. During this time, Eric Holm filed for personal bankruptcy.

On April 3, 2008, Vicorp filed for bankruptcy under Chapter 11 of the federal bankruptcy code, and closed 56 company-owned restaurants as a result of the move, leaving a total of 343 Village Inn and Bakers Square locations.

In 2009, American Blue Ribbon Holdings, a company owned by Fidelity National Financial and Newport Global Advisors, acquired the assets of Vicorp, including Village Inn and Bakers Square.

In 2010, Village Inn locations started updating to the new corporate logo, with several locations implementing it.

On January 24, 2020, Village Inn abruptly closed 24 locations, with employees showing up for their shifts sometimes met by locked doors. Locations closed in Arizona include Chandler (Alma School Road), Gilbert, Mesa (Dobson Road and McKellips Road), and Phoenix (Bell Road at 3rd Street). Aurora (Colfax Avenue), Broomfield, Littleton (Ken Caryl Avenue), Castle Rock, Monument, and Wheat Ridge locations closed in Colorado, while Lakeland, Tampa (North Dale Mabry Highway), and Winter Garden locations closed in Florida. Iowa lost locations in Clinton, Coralville, and Des Moines. Utah locations closed were North Salt Lake City, Orem, Roy, Sandy, and West Jordan. Locations in Omaha, Nebraska (Dodge Street) and Albuquerque, New Mexico (La Orilla) also closed.

On January 27, 2020, American Blue Ribbon Holdings filed for Chapter 11 bankruptcy protection after closing 33 locations across both brands.

On September 14, 2020, Village Inn emerged from bankruptcy protection with 140 locations as a subsidiary of restructured parent company, VIBSQ Holdings LLC.

In July 2021, VIBSQ Holdings was sold to BBQ Holdings, parent of Famous Dave's chain of barbecue restaurants.

== See also ==
- List of pancake houses
