= Toni Turner =

Toni Turner, President of Trendstar Trading Group, LLC, is a technical analyst as well as an educator and speaker in the financial arena. She is the author of the books: A Beginner’s Guide to Day Trading Online, 2nd Ed., A Beginner’s Guide to Short-term Trading, 2nd Ed., Short-Term Trading in the New Stock Market, and Invest to Win: Earn & Keep Profits in Bull and Bear Markets with the Gains Master Approach, co-authored with Gordon Scott, CMT. Her books have been translated into five languages.

Turner has appeared on CNBC, CNN, NBC, MSNBC, and FOX Business News. She has been featured in periodicals including Fortune, Stocks and Commodities, SFO, Fidelity Active Trader, and Bloomberg Personal Finance and online publications including TradingMarkets.com, Equities.com, and MarketWatch. She speaks at trading forums and conferences across the United States, including college campuses, trading expos, and money shows. Turner is a bi-weekly contributor to The Street’s RealMoney.com and RealMoneyPro.com.
