= Marie Callender's =

American restaurant chain

Marie Callender’s, Inc.

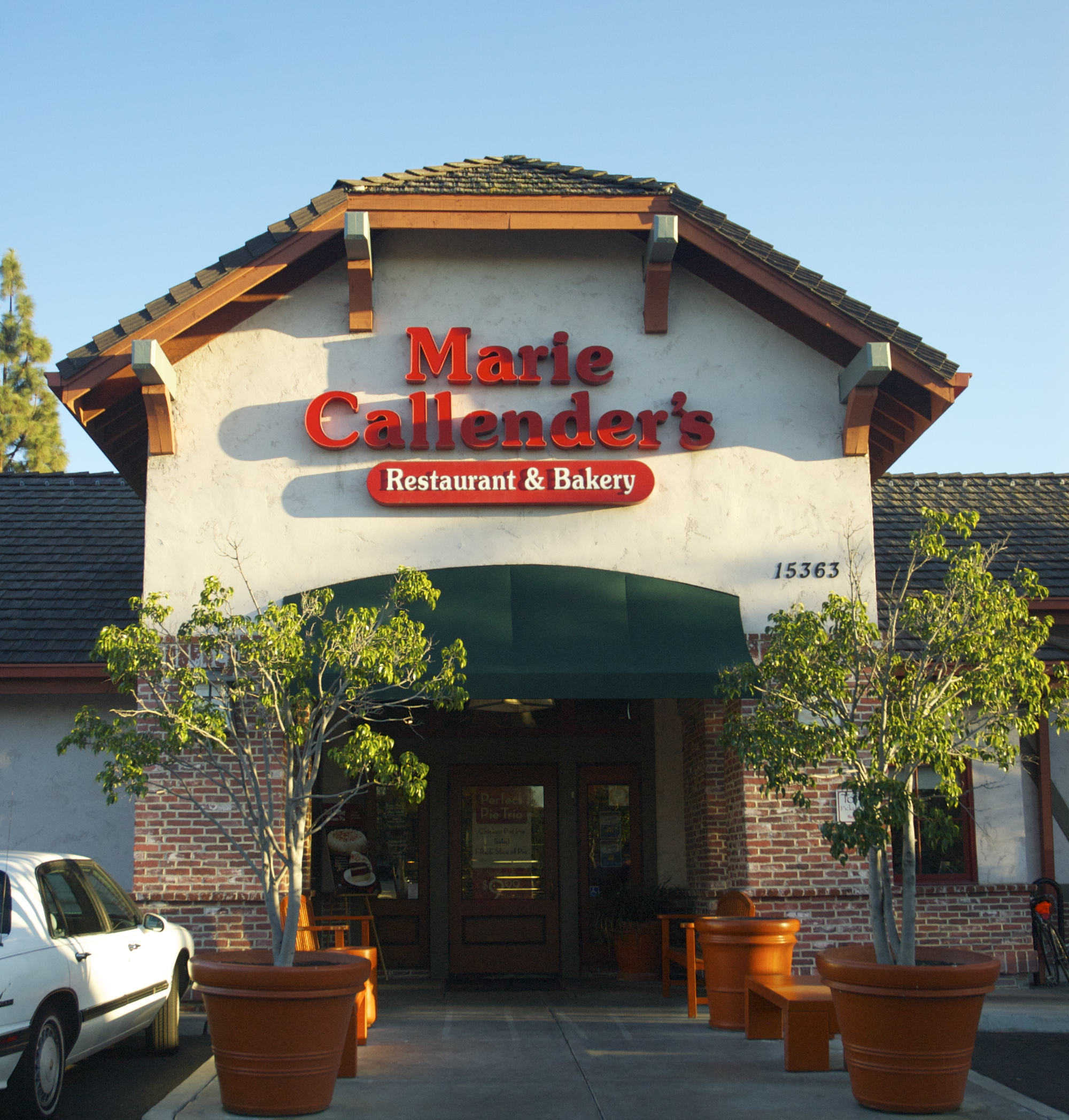
- Exterior of a Marie Callender's (now permanently closed) in Irvine, California, in 2013
- Type: Subsidiary
- Industry: Restaurants
- Genre: Casual Dining
- Founded: 1948; 78 years ago Long Beach, California, U.S.
- Founder: Callender family (Cal Warren, Don and Marie)
- Headquarters: Mission Viejo, California, U.S.
- Number of locations: 23 as of August 2026
- Products: Food
- Owner: Elite Restaurant Group
- Parent: Marie Callender's Inc.
- Website: mariecallenders.com

Marie Callender's is an American restaurant chain. Its headquarters are in the Marie Callender's Corporate Support Center in Mission Viejo, Orange County, California. As of October 2026, the company operates 23 locations in California, Idaho, Nevada, and Utah.

== History ==
=== First foundation ===
In the 1930s, Marie Callender and her husband Cal Warren Callender began selling pies in the city of Long Beach and in Orange County. In 1948, they sold their family car and used the money to set up a wholesale bakery with their son Don. The first official location was opened in 1964.

Eventually, Don opened a retail outlet in Orange, California, naming it after his mother, gradually adding other food. Within five years the chain was expanded to 12 more locations and opened its first locations outside of California (Las Vegas and Houston) in 1969. It grew into 84 locations by the end of the 1970s. However, the Houston location closed down in 1981. In 1996, the company announced that they planned to open three new restaurants in the Houston area once again. At the end, all three remaining locations in Houston closed down between 2000 and 2001 due to restaurants being unprofitable.

=== Late 20th century sales ===
In 1986, the restaurant chain was sold to Ramada Inn, then in 1990, to Wilshire Restaurant Group, Inc. Marie Callender pie shops, Inc. was purchased from Saunders Karp & Megrue (SKM) in 1999 by an affiliate of Castle Harlan, a New York-based financial firm.

The company owned the East Side Mario's restaurant chain from 1997 (when it bought the chain from PepsiCo) to 2000.

=== Perkins & Marie Callender's Inc ===
In 2006, Castle Harlan merged Marie Callender's with another of its interests, Perkins Restaurant & Bakery. The combined chain, known as Perkins & Marie Callender's Inc. (PMCI), was headquartered in Memphis, Tennessee.

The business flourished until Don Callender died on January 7, 2009, due to complications resulting from head trauma sustained during a fall at home.

On June 13, 2011, a total of 58 units were closed, including 31 Marie Callender's and 27 Perkins' due to bankruptcy restructuring (Chapter 11). During bankruptcy, PMCI sold the Marie Callender's brand to ConAgra for US$57.5 million. Later that year, PMCI exited bankruptcy under the control of Wayzata Investment Partners.

=== Marie Callender's Inc. ===
On August 5, 2019, 29 stores were closed and the holding company for Perkins and Marie Callender's filed for bankruptcy. The chains were later split apart, with Perkins being bought by Huddle House, while Marie Callender's was sold to Elite Restaurant Group, which formed a new company known as Marie Callender's Inc. to operate the chain, for US$1.75 million.

== Business ==
=== Restaurants ===
In later years, a typical restaurant would have a fully stocked bar, or saloon, serving alcoholic beverages. This is in contrast to family restaurants like Denny's or Village Inn, which generally do not serve alcoholic beverages. A salad bar is also a staple.

The type of cuisine served is mainly American, although many of the dishes are slanted towards styles of preparation that resemble Italian, Mexican, French, Cajun, or Chinese. Soups and sandwiches are available as meals or à la carte. Pies are signature items on the dessert menu: there are over 30 varieties available.

The interiors of the chain's earlier restaurants are decorated with antiques circa 1900, providing a theme that is reminiscent of Victorian England as well as early United States. Later restaurants reflect more modern tastes, with a clean interior and photos of food.

=== Frozen foods ===
For years the chain has licensed its name for shelf-stable and frozen entrees and sides. Various product licenses were included in a sale to ConAgra Foods in 1994 for $140 million. The name Marie Callender's was retained for the food line following the division's sale. In 2010, its cheesy chicken & rice meal was pulled due to a salmonella outbreak.

== Don Callender ==
Don Callender
- Born: Donald W. Callender; September 27, 1927; Ventura, California, U.S.
- Died: January 7, 2009 (aged 81); Newport Beach, California, U.S.
- Education: Long Beach Poly High School
- Occupation: Businessman
- Known for: Marie Callender's restaurants and pies
- Spouse(s): Katy Callender, Patricia (first, divorce)
- Children: 4
- Parent(s): Cal Warren Callender (1907–1984); Marie Callender (1907–1995)

Donald W. Callender (September 27, 1927 – January 7, 2009) was an American restaurateur and co-founder of the Marie Callender's chain of restaurants, which originated in Southern California. He was also the creator of Babe's Slim Pign's in Redlands, P.H. Woods in Moreno Valley, Top-Gun Restaurant Grill, and Babe's Bar-B-Que & Brewery in Rancho Mirage.

Callender is credited as being among the first restaurateurs to offer franchise operations, with the first Marie Callender's franchisee opening 62 years ago in Orange in 1964.

=== Biography ===
In the 1930s, Marie Callender (1907–1995), her husband Cal Warren Callender (1907–1984), and their only child, Don, lived in a trailer park in Huntington Beach. Marie baked and sold pies to augment the family's income, with Don delivering her pies to customers on his bicycle. A 1945 graduate of Long Beach Poly High School, he joined the Merchant Marine for a brief tour at the end of World War II and then returned home to southern California.

Don Callender died at age 81 in 2009 at Hoag Memorial Hospital Presbyterian in Newport Beach, due to complications resulting from head trauma sustained during a fall at his home over a year earlier.

=== Retail endeavors ===
By 1948, twenty-one year old Don was working to expand the business by selling pies to restaurants in Long Beach and Orange County. In 1951, he purchased a home on Gondar Ave. in the Plaza area of Long Beach, where the Callender family did their baking before shifting the expanding operation to a Quonset hut on Anaheim St. in Long Beach. Eventually, Don ventured into the retail realm, opening his first outlet in Orange (at 574 N. Tustin St.) and naming it after his mother, Marie. With continued experimentation, he gradually expanded his inventory and added other menu items which would later become Marie Callender fare.

=== Company sale and other businesses ===
By the time Callender sold the company in 1986 to Ramada for a reported $80 million, the chain had grown to 120 locations nationwide. Following the sale, Don remained in the restaurant industry, planning to start a second 21,000-square-foot (1,950 m^{2}) Babe's in Indio. Unfortunately, health issues forced Callender out of the project before seeing the project come to full fruition. The building was subsequently leased to Kaiser Restaurant Group, a local restaurant management consortium. Jackelope Ranch, also in Indio, opened the day after Don passed, as a Southwestern-themed barbecue.
