= Sulphur Creek (California) =

Creek in California, United States

Sulphur Creek Cañada Salada, Arroyo Salada
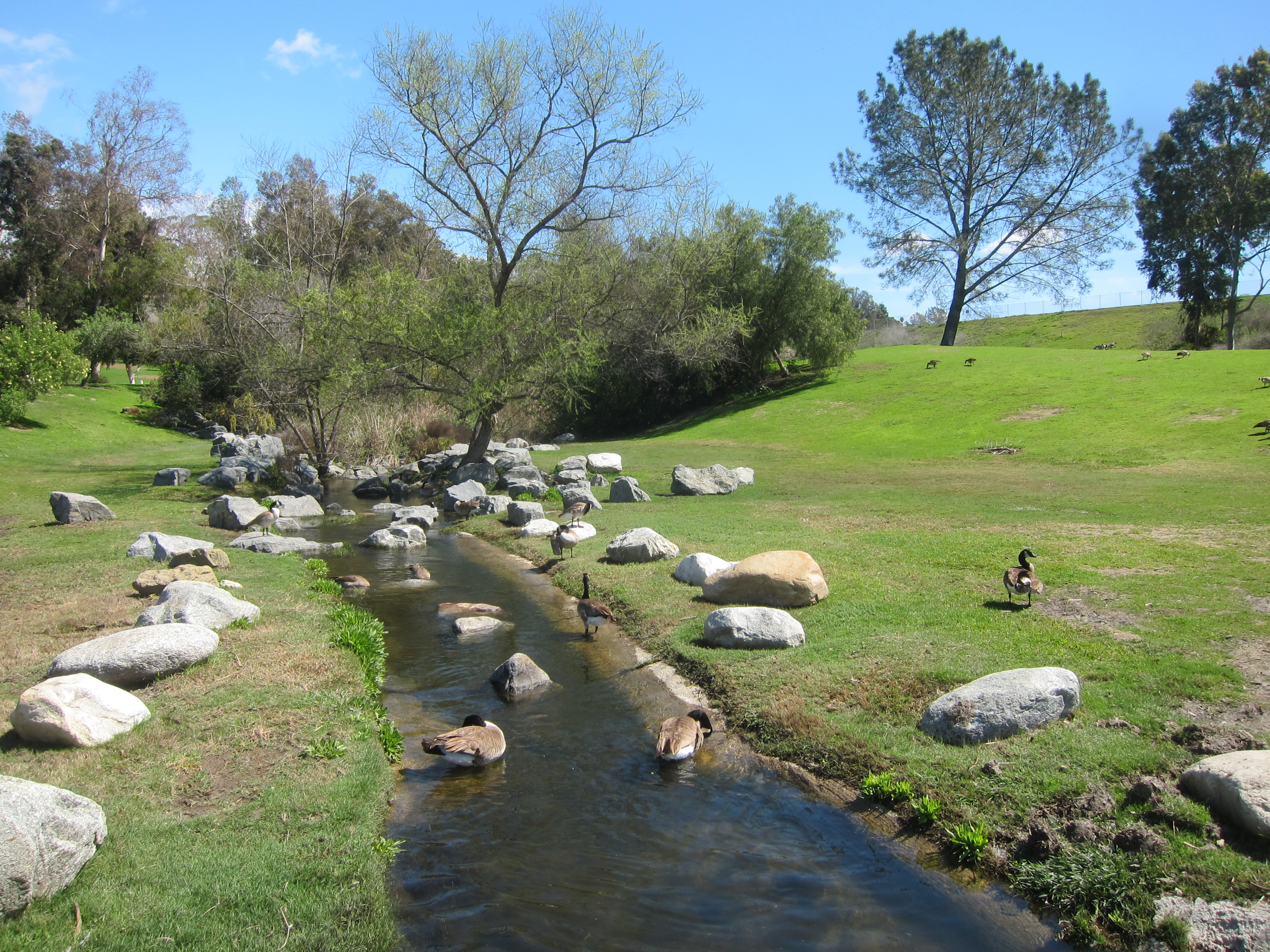
- In Laguna Niguel Regional Park

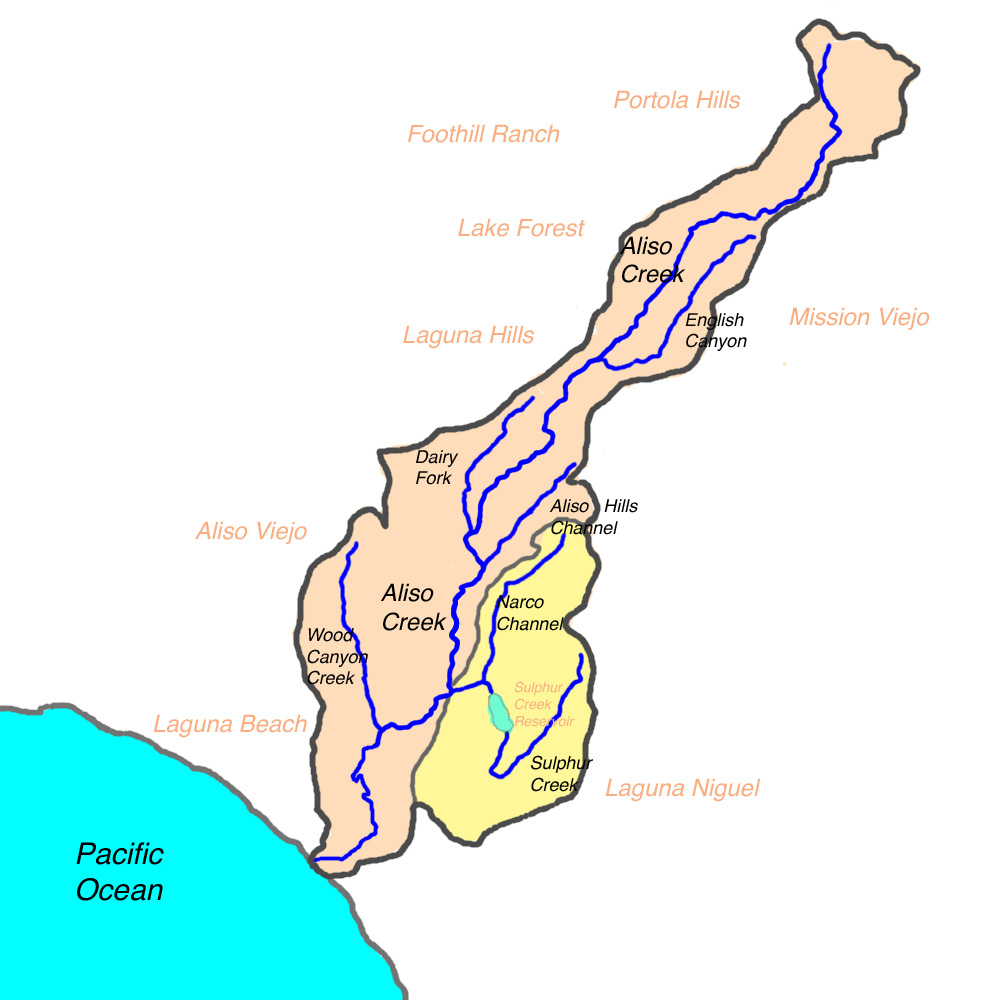
- Map of Aliso Creek watershed with Sulphur Creek subwatershed highlighted

Location
- Country: United States
- State: California
- Counties: Orange County
- Cities: Laguna Hills, Laguna Niguel, San Juan Capistrano

Physical characteristics
- Source
  - location: Convergence of several storm drain outlets, Laguna Hills
  - coordinates: 33°33′33″N 117°41′04″W
  - elevation: 190 ft (58 m)
- Mouth: Aliso Creek just above the beginning of Aliso and Wood Canyons Regional Park and downstream of Laguna Niguel Regional Park
  - location: Laguna Niguel
  - coordinates: 33°32′32″N 117°42′16″W
  - elevation: 58 ft (18 m)
- Length: 4.8 mi (7.7 km)
- Basin size: 6 sq mi (16 km^{2})
- Discharge
  - location: Alicia Parkway culvert, 130 yards (120 m) above the mouth
  - average: 2.3 cu ft/s (0.065 m^{3}/s)
  - minimum: 0 cu ft/s (0 m^{3}/s)
  - maximum: 2,000 cu ft/s (57 m^{3}/s)

Basin features
- Tributaries
  - left: Niguel Storm Drain
  - right: Narco Channel

Sulphur Creek is an approximately 4.5-mile (7.2 km) tributary of Aliso Creek in Orange County, California. The creek drains about 6 square miles (16 km^{2}) in the suburban cities of Laguna Niguel and Laguna Hills. Although most of its watershed has been used for master planned residential development, the creek retains a natural channel with riparian and wetland habitat in parts of Laguna Niguel Regional Park and Aliso and Wood Canyons Regional Park. Urban runoff has changed the once seasonal creek into a perennial stream.

The Sulphur Creek watershed was once part of the territory of the semi-nomadic Acjachemen Native Americans, who were colonized by the Spanish in the 17th and 18th centuries and called the Juaneño after nearby Mission San Juan Capistrano. The creek later became part of the Rancho Niguel Mexican land grant and was mostly agricultural and range land until the 1960s, when suburban residential development began in the watershed. Sulphur Creek Dam was built in 1966, forming Laguna Niguel Lake.

== Course ==
The creek begins at the outlet of a storm channel near the intersection of Crown Valley Parkway and Glenrock Drive, and flows in a southwesterly direction parallel to Crown Valley Parkway. U.S. Geological Survey (USGS) topographic maps show the historic channel of the creek beginning slightly further north, under what is now the SR 73/Greenfield Drive interchange. The upper section of the creek is a narrow corridor of restored wetland, with the exception of concrete culverts under Moulton Parkway, Nueva Vista Drive and La Paz Road. Below La Paz Road the creek flows in a concrete channel about 4 feet (1.2 m) wide, although the banks are vegetated.

The creek makes a sharp turn to the north at Crown Valley Park, where it receives two tributaries from the left, the Niguel Storm Drain and a smaller unnamed stream. The creek then flows north through a concrete channel past the South Orange County Wastewater Authority (SOCWA) water treatment plant, reverting to a natural channel in Laguna Niguel Regional Park. The earth-filled Sulphur Creek Dam forms 44-acre (18 ha) Laguna Niguel Lake (formerly known as Sulphur Creek Reservoir), slightly over a mile (1.6 km) long.

The creek exits the dam via a concrete spillway on the east side and flows through the middle of Laguna Niguel Regional Park. About a half-mile (0.8 km) below Sulphur Creek Dam, it is joined by a large northern tributary known as Narco Channel. North Sulphur Creek, which has mostly been channeled underground, is a major source of pollution in Sulphur Creek and lower Aliso Creek. Sulphur Creek then runs west, passing Kite Hill and flows in a culvert under Alicia Parkway. Below this point it flows through a small canyon and receives an unnamed tributary from the left, before joining Aliso Creek at the edge of Aliso and Wood Canyons Wilderness Park.

The Sulphur Creek watershed encompasses about 6 square miles (16 km^{2}), or about 17 percent of the entire Aliso Creek watershed. Primarily residential, it is bordered on the north by the Aliso Hills Channel watershed (tributary to Aliso Creek), on the south and southwest by the watershed of Salt Creek, and to the east by the watershed of Oso Creek, a tributary of Arroyo Trabuco. Most of the basin of Sulphur Creek is hilly, and the topography has been heavily re-graded for residential development and road construction. Several canyons that originally drained into the creek have been filled in, and storm channels and drains are often built along the original course of these canyons.

== Geology ==
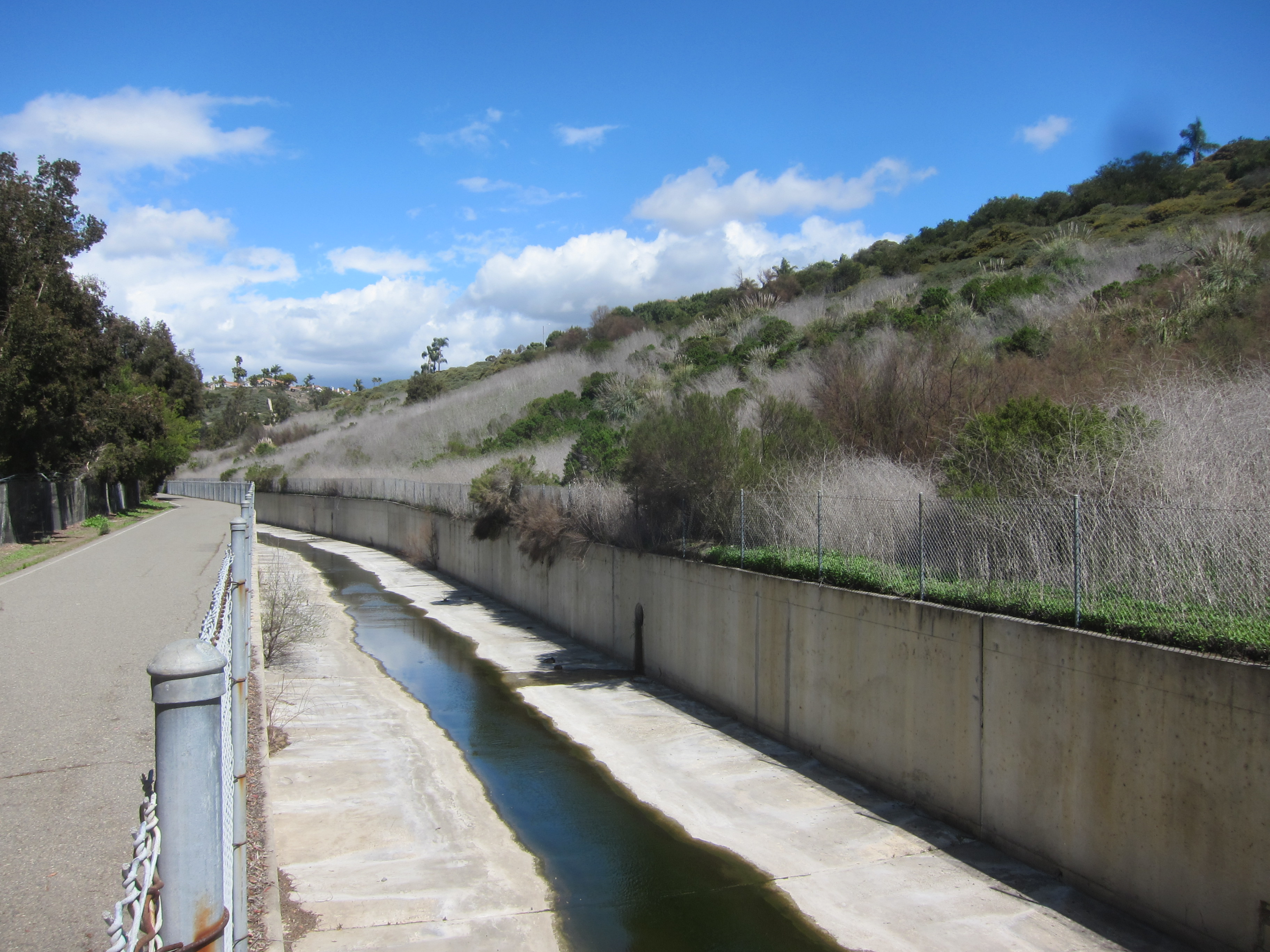
Concrete channel of Sulphur Creek upstream of Laguna Niguel Lake

About ten million years ago, much of western and southern Orange County and most of coastal Southern California was part of a warm and shallow sea. This sea receded over time, leaving a large and flat coastal plain. Over 1.22 million years ago, the uplift of the San Joaquin Hills began along a blind thrust fault that stretches north into the Los Angeles Basin, eventually rising to an average of 500 to 700 feet (150 to 210 m) above sea level, with the highest peaks topping out at about 1,000 feet (300 m). Rising at about 0.6 to 0.8 feet (0.18 to 0.24 m) per one thousand years, a series of marine terraces formed along with the hills' uplift.

The San Joaquin Hills around the Sulphur Creek watershed are composed primarily of marine sedimentary rocks dating from the Miocene (23–5 million years ago). The oldest rocks in this area are referred to as the Vaqueros Formation, while the younger are named the Monterey Formation. This hilly area is drained by Sulphur Creek to the northwest, Salt Creek to the south, small and unnamed coastal canyons to the southwest, and small tributaries of Trabuco and Oso Creeks to the east. This area is located northwest of the San Juan Creek valley, southeast of the Aliso Creek valley, and west of the Oso Creek drainage.

It has been speculated that before the uplift of the San Joaquin Hills, the waters of Sulphur Creek may have once drained southward towards Salt Creek, which flows into the Pacific about 2 miles (3.2 km) south of the outlet of Aliso Creek. At some point in time, it was captured into the Aliso Creek watershed, creating its sharp northward turn at Crown Valley Park. The speculated original course of the creek followed modern-day Crown Valley Parkway to Salt Creek at what is now the intersection of Crown Valley Parkway and Camino del Avion. The truncated course is now drained by a smaller tributary of Salt Creek, the Arroyo Salada Storm Channel.

== History ==
Sulphur Creek was once part of the territory of the Acjachemen Native Americans, who used the area for hunting and gathering. The village of Niguili, for which modern-day Laguna Niguel is named, was located near the confluence of Sulphur and Aliso Creeks, though the bulk of their population was further south at the confluence of San Juan Creek and Arroyo Trabuco. The Acjachemen were named the Juaneño by Spanish priests in the 18th century, who established a mission at the present-day location of San Juan Capistrano. Following the Spanish arrival, most Juaneño clustered around the mission in the south. Like many other once widespread Juaneño villages, Niguili was likely abandoned soon after, and there is no trace of it remaining.

After Mexican independence, the 13,316-acre (5,389 ha) Rancho Niguel which included Sulphur Creek was granted to Juan Avila. For many decades, the Sulphur Creek watershed was used for cattle and sheep ranching. In 1881 the ranch was purchased by Lewis Moulton and Jean Pierre Daguerre, who expanded it to 21,000 acres (85 km^{2}). In the 1960s, the City of Laguna Niguel bought a large portion of the ranch from the Moulton family; it was later donated to the county for recreational use. Resultantly, the upper and lower sections of the creek are now under county ownership, and Laguna Niguel Lake is managed by the Orange County Flood Control District.

The 485-foot (148 m) long and 42-foot (13 m) high Sulphur Creek Dam was built in 1966 by the Moulton Niguel Water District to create Sulphur Creek Reservoir (later renamed Laguna Niguel Lake), which stored about 520 acre-feet (640,000 m^{3}) for irrigation. In 1970 the Orange County Flood Control District purchased the dam and reservoir, and the 236-acre (0.96 km^{2}) Laguna Niguel Regional Park was established around it in 1973. Between the 1960s and 1990s, most of the area surrounding the creek were regraded for suburban residential development, and many side canyons and tributaries were filled in and replaced by storm drains discharging increasing volumes of urban runoff to the creek. In 1990 the confluence of Sulphur Creek and Aliso Creek became part of Aliso and Wood Canyons Regional Park.

== Environmental features and issues ==
Historically, the Sulphur Creek watershed was mostly hilly terrain consisting of chaparral and coastal sage scrub. Riparian forest likely consisting of live oak, sycamore, alder and other small trees lined the banks of the stream. Most of this native habitat was cleared for housing beginning in the 1960s, although a few undeveloped areas remain along hillsides, especially around Laguna Niguel Regional Park.

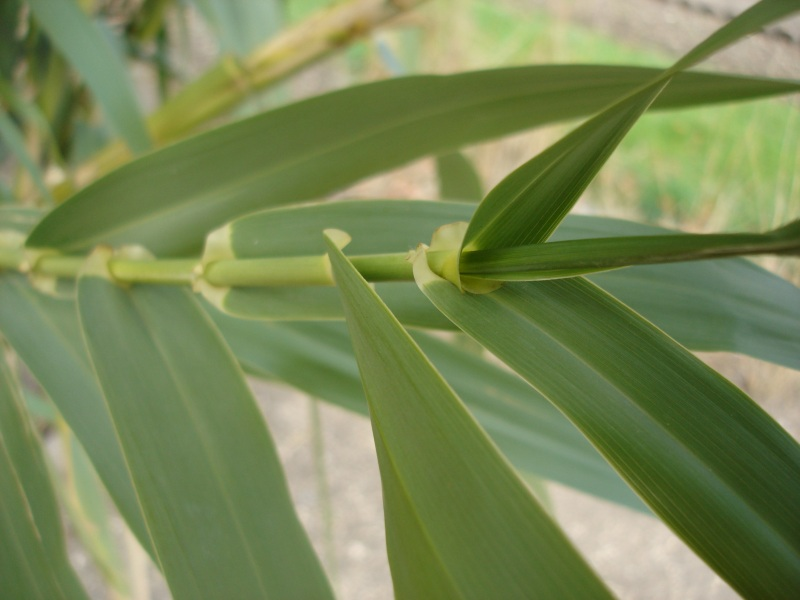
Arundo is the dominant invasive plant species in the Sulphur Creek watershed, and is prevalent along many Orange County streams.

A number of exotic plant species have been introduced to the Sulphur Creek watershed including Arundo donax (giant reed), castor bean and tobacco tree. Arundo is especially problematic as it tends to crowd out other plant species, reducing habitat for native animals as well. It can grow extremely fast with a high rate of water consumption, and during flood events, arundo segments can be washed downstream, establishing new colonies.

While no raw sewage flows into the creek, the creek is contaminated by large quantities of urban runoff from impervious paved surfaces that collects toxins before pouring untreated into the creek. Such untreated runoff has caused contamination by E. coli and Enterovirus, making the water unsafe for human contact. The County of Orange estimates that 87 percent of the Sulphur Creek course is "severely degraded." Increasing concentrations of nutrients from fertilizer and other pollutants in urban runoff have caused algae blooms and eutrophication in the creek above Laguna Niguel Lake.

Several projects are under way in the Sulphur Creek watershed to remove non-native species and restore native riparian vegetation.

Aliso and Wood Canyons Regional Park, which is located at the lower extreme of Sulphur Creek, supports far more native species than the Sulphur Creek watershed.

== Recreation ==
Laguna Niguel Lake is the primary recreational facility in the watershed and is said to be one of the largest fisheries of Southern Orange County. The lake is annually stocked with bluegill, catfish, and bass. Aside from the reservoir, there is no body of water in the watershed that is navigable. There are several other parks in the watershed; these are Crown Valley Park, Sulphur Creek Park, and others. A paved trail follows Sulphur Creek from near the terminus of Crown Valley Park to near its mouth at Alicia Parkway.

== Etymology ==
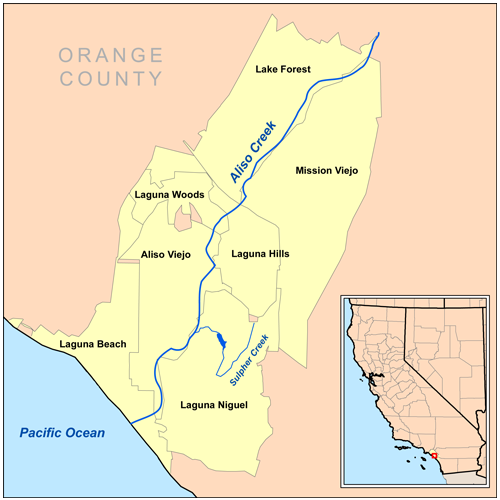
Map of Aliso Creek watershed showing named cities

The Geographic Names Information System lists "Arroyo Salada" (Spanish: Salt Canyon) as a variant name. Cañada Salada, translated to "Valley of Salt" or "Salt Canyon" (Durham's Place Names of the Greater Los Angeles Area, 2001) is another name for the lower section of the creek. These names, dating to Spanish times, imply that the creek was naturally salty or briny. As Salt Creek to the south bears a name of similar meaning, and that the "Arroyo Salada" Storm Channel occupies the lower section of the prehistoric Sulphur Creek watershed, there is further proof by salt concentrations that the two watersheds were once linked (see Watershed).

== See also ==
- Tributaries of Aliso Creek
  - Wood Canyon Creek
- List of rivers of Orange County, California
- List of rivers of California
