= Aliso and Wood Canyons Wilderness Park =

Regional park in California, United States

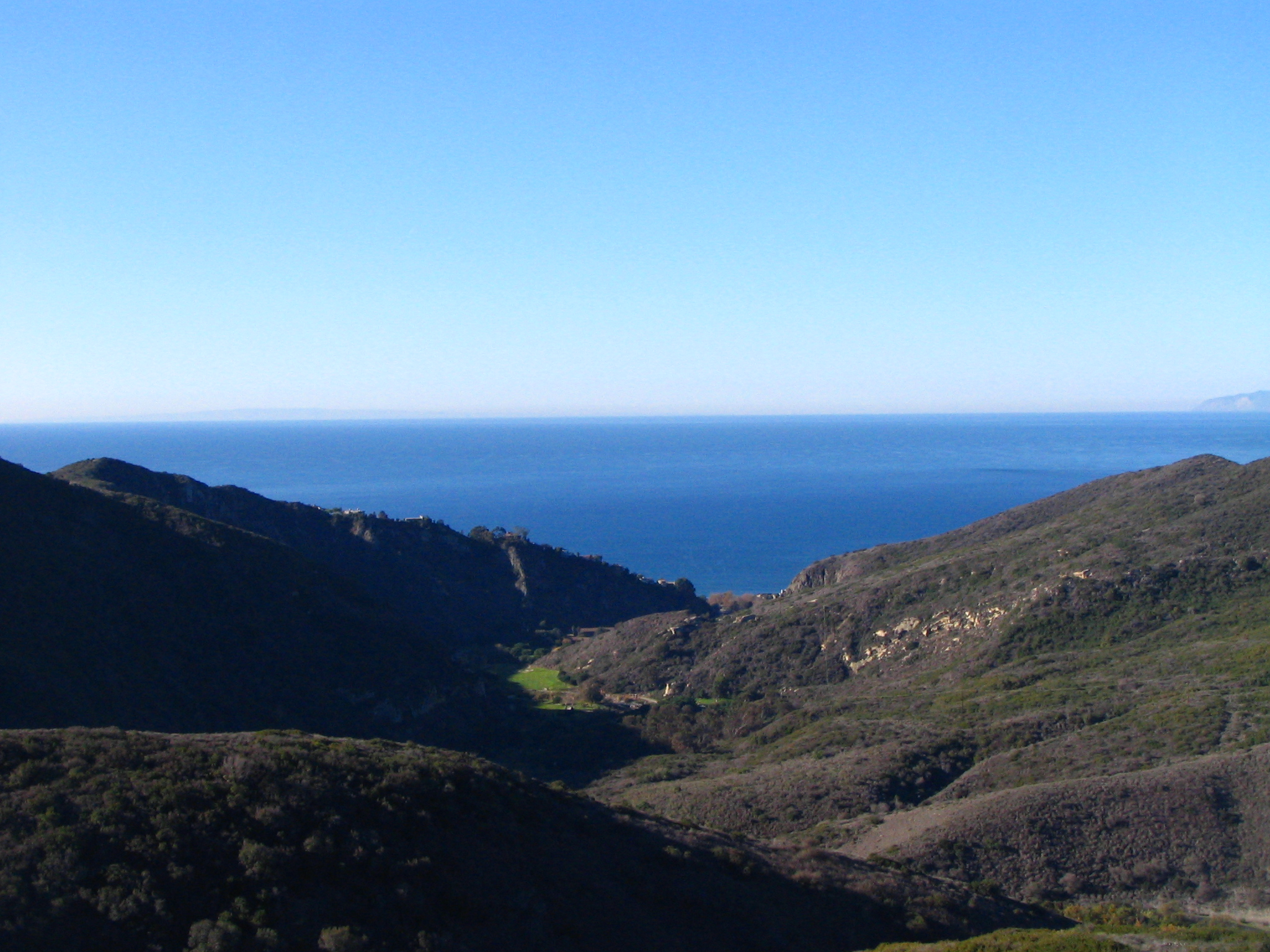
- A view of Aliso Canyon and the Pacific Ocean, looking westward. San Clemente and Santa Catalina islands are visible in the distance.

- Location within southern California
- Location: Orange County, California, United States
- Nearest city: Aliso Viejo, Dana Point, Laguna Beach, Laguna Niguel
- Coordinates: 33°32′28″N 117°44′13″W
- Area: 4,500 acres (18 km^{2})
- Max. elevation: Temple Hill; 33°33′18″N 117°45′29″W; 1,036 ft (316 m)
- Min. elevation: Aliso Creek; 14 ft (4.3 m)
- Established: 1990
- Operator: OC Parks
- Website: OC Parks

Aliso and Wood Canyons Wilderness Park is a major regional park in the San Joaquin Hills of Orange County, California in the United States. Comprising 4,500 acres (1,800 ha) of rugged coastal canyons, open grassland, and riparian woodland, the park borders the suburban cities of Aliso Viejo, Dana Point, Laguna Beach, Laguna Hills and Laguna Niguel and lies within a portion of the ancestral homeland of the indigenous Acjachemen people. Part of the natural area is old-growth forest and recognized by Old-Growth Forest Network.

Aliso and Wood Canyons is part of a larger park complex known as the South Coast Wilderness. Surrounded by heavy suburban development and the Pacific Ocean, it is an important regional wildlife preserve. The park includes trails for hiking, mountain biking, and horseback riding; a greenbelt and bikeway along Aliso Creek; and various geological features such as caves, springs, and exposed marine fossil beds. The park is administered by the County of Orange under the OC Parks Department.

The name Aliso originated in the 18th century when Spanish explorers named Aliso Creek, probably for the Alnus rhombifolia (white alder) tree native to the area. Wood Canyon was likely named for the groves of California live oak and sycamores that are found in the canyon. In 2021, the park was designated by the Old Growth Forest Network for its old live oak and sycamore trees.

== History ==
The park was originally inhabited by the Acjachemen and Tongva Native Americans who used Aliso Creek as the boundary between their respective territories to the south and north. The relationship between the two tribes was mostly peaceful. Because Aliso Canyon was one of the few places in what is now south Orange County with perennial streams and springs – as well as providing easy access from inland areas to the Pacific Ocean – it was a major wintering spot for native peoples. The Acjachemen village of Niguili was located in what is now the park, near the confluence of Aliso Creek and Sulphur Creek.

The 1769 Spanish Portola expedition was the first European party to explore the area. Spanish ships were also known to anchor in the bay at the mouth of Aliso Canyon and sailors "harvested large timbers from the river area". In the following decades the Spanish colonized California they established missions to convert the Native Americans to Christianity with varying degrees of success. The peoples who once lived in Aliso Canyon were moved by the Spanish to the nearby Mission San Juan Capistrano.

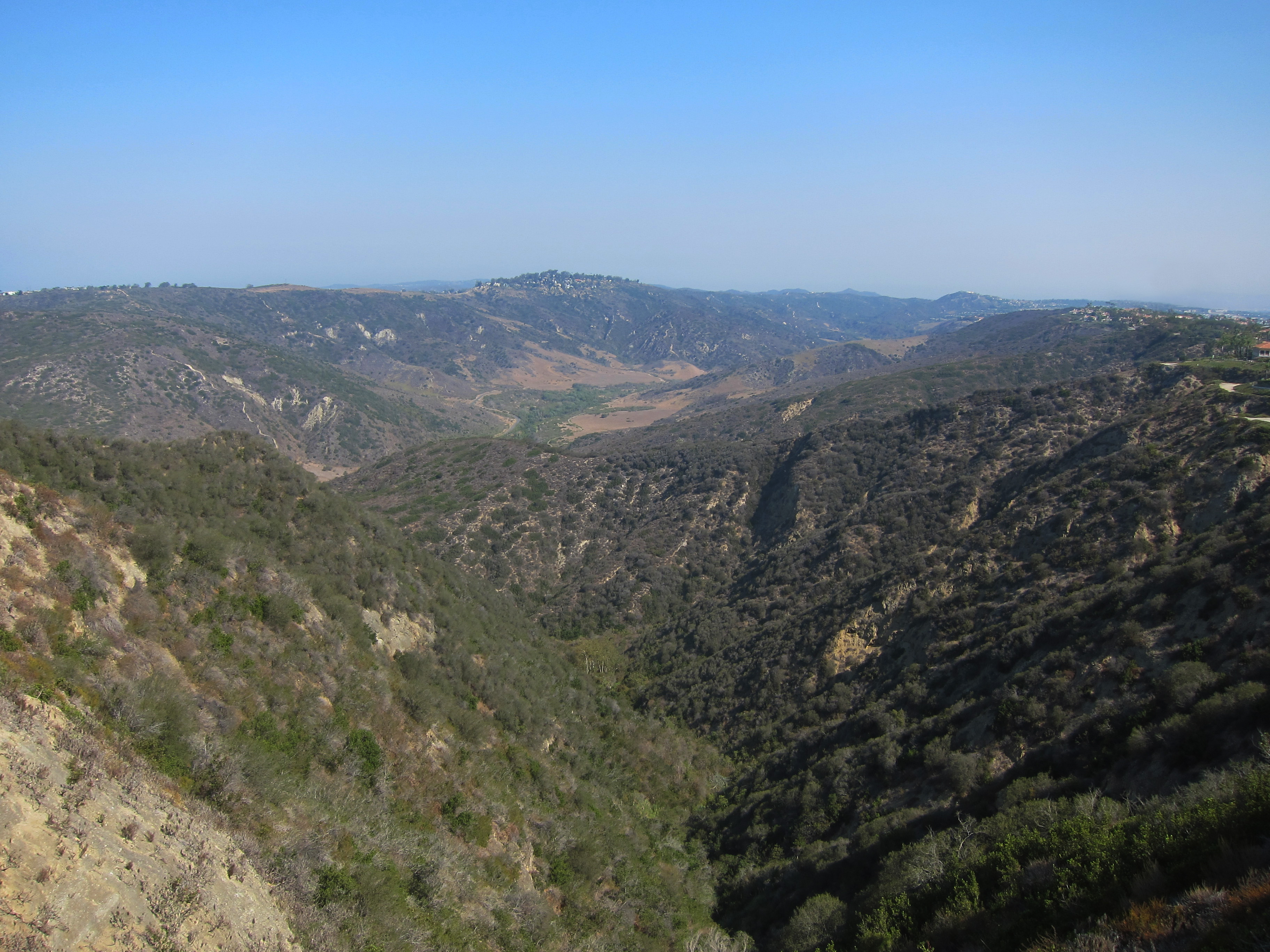
Aliso Canyon from near the summit of Niguel Hill, looking northward towards Temple Hill

After Mexico's independence from Spain in 1821 the missions were secularized and mission lands were divided into private land grants. The 13,316-acre (5,389 ha) Rancho Niguel, which included most of what is now the park, was granted to Juan Avila in 1842. After the Mexican–American War in 1850, California became part of the United States; after a severe drought Avila sold the ranch in 1865. Rancho Niguel changed hands multiple times until it was acquired by Lewis Moulton and Jean Pierre Daguerre in 1895.

During the 19th century, others also took advantage of the shelter and seclusion offered by Aliso Canyon. Dripping Cave (once used by the local Native Americans as a shelter), tucked into a sheltered part of Wood Canyon, became a "base of operations" of outlaws, led by Juan Flores, who robbed stagecoaches traveling between Los Angeles and San Diego. Long after the bandits were arrested, it retains the nickname "Robbers Cave". In 1871 Eugene Salter, the first white settler along Aliso Creek, claimed 152 acres (62 ha) in the canyon just outside the Rancho Niguel. The next year, the homestead was taken over by the Thurston family who irrigated an orchard using water from Aliso Creek.

Aliso Canyon was used for sheep ranching through the first half of the 20th century, although tourism was also growing due to the popularity of Aliso Beach at canyon's end, and the establishment of the Aliso Creek Inn and Golf Course on the old Thurston property in 1950. During the 1960s, the Rancho Niguel was sold for residential suburban development in the planned cities of Aliso Viejo, Laguna Hills and Laguna Niguel. The Aliso Canyon was the proposed location of a "much publicized national fitness center headed by former Los Angeles Rams coach George Allen." A six-lane highway was proposed to run the length of the canyon, to link inland communities with Laguna Beach.

The canyon was spared from development when about 40 land parcels were acquired by the county for use as a park, the largest in 1979 when the Mission Viejo Company donated 3,400 acres (1,400 ha). The park officially opened on March 31, 1990 as Aliso and Wood Canyons Regional Park; it was later designated a Wilderness Park to better preserve native habitat. Continued land acquisitions and donations since then brought the park to its current size.

== Features and characteristics ==
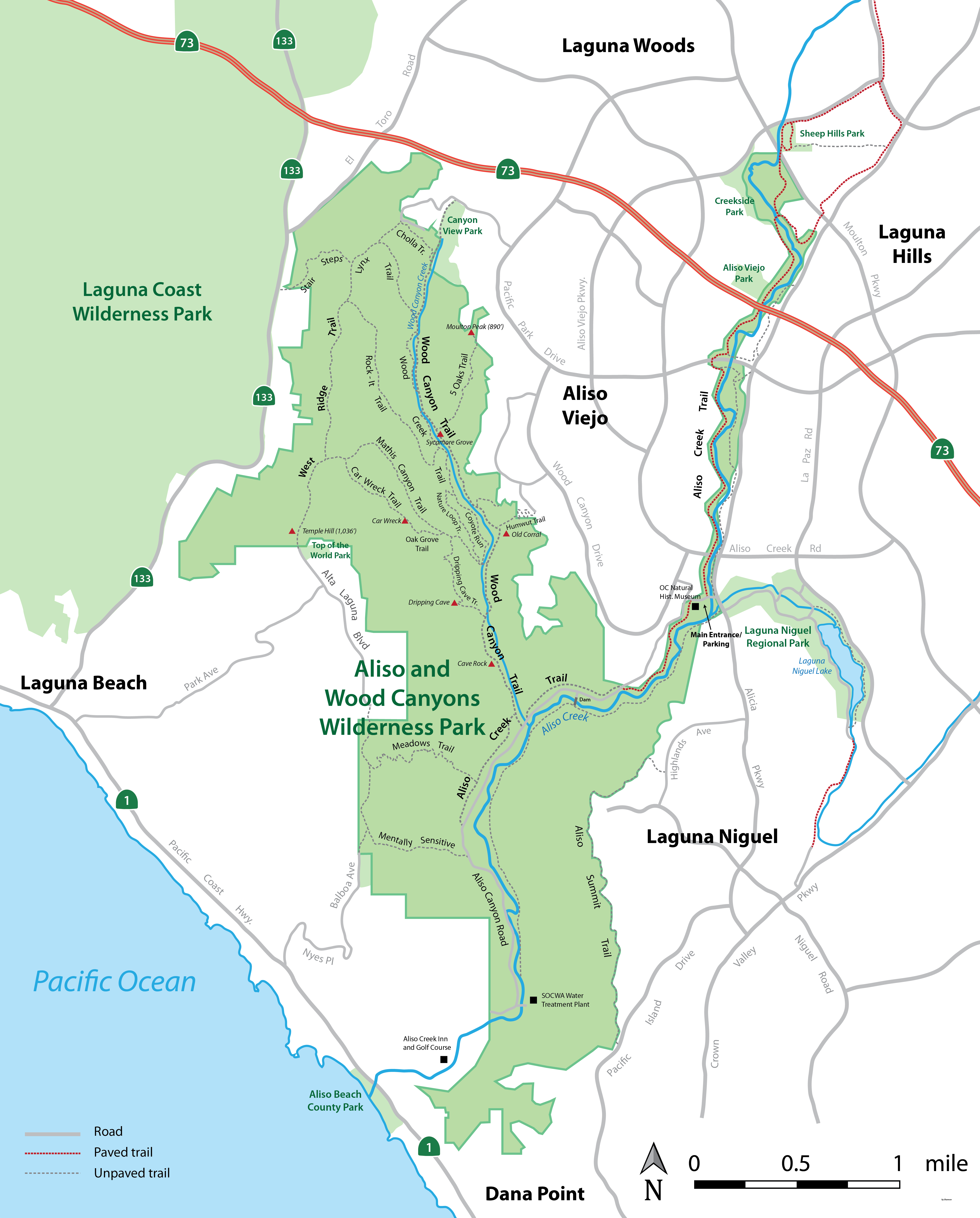
Trail map (click to enlarge)

The park encompasses the dramatic Aliso Canyon, which is the valley formed by Aliso Creek as it slices through the San Joaquin Hills on its way from the Cleveland National Forest to the Pacific Ocean. Wood Canyon is formed by Wood Canyon Creek as it flows south to join Aliso Creek in the center of the park. Another tributary, Sulphur Creek, joins Aliso Creek at the eastern end of the park. Elevations within the park range from 14 feet (4.3 m) above sea level to 1,036 feet (316 m) at Temple Hill in Laguna Beach (colloquially "Top of the World"), on the park's western boundary. On a clear day, most of Orange County can be seen from Temple Hill and the other ridge tops surrounding Aliso Canyon.

Aliso and Wood Canyons links two major park systems in Orange County. The 22,000-acre (8,900 ha) South Coast Wilderness, which protects much of the San Joaquin Hills ecosystem, includes Laguna Coast Wilderness Park which borders Aliso and Wood Canyons to the north. The Aliso Creek Corridor, a greenbelt stretching 19 miles (31 km) along Aliso Creek to national forest lands in the Santa Ana Mountains, also terminates in Aliso Canyon. Aliso and Wood Canyons very nearly touches the popular Aliso Beach County Park on its southern end; however, the two are separated by the private Ranch at Laguna Beach (formerly Aliso Creek Inn and Golf Course), preventing visitors from accessing the beach using park trails. A plan to extend a public trail through this property was indefinitely suspended in 2009 after the Great Recession.

The park contains a large number of artifacts from past inhabitants of the area. Many types of these prehistoric artifacts are found throughout the park. These include, but are not limited to, open air shell middens, rock shelters, stone tools, and their production sites. There is also historic farm equipment and buildings dating from the Rancho Niguel period. Such historical sites include the Moulton Cement Plant, Bacon House site, and Tischler Rock.

=== Climate ===
The park has a warm, dry Mediterranean climate, with mild winters and hot summers. Most of the annual rainfall occurs between December and March. The average annual precipitation is 16.42 inches (417 mm).

=== Trails and access ===
The park is open from 7 am to sunset. The main entrance and parking are located off Alicia Parkway at AWMA Road in Laguna Niguel. There is no entrance fee, but a $3 fee applies for parking.

About 30 miles (48 km) of recreational trails wind through the park. The most prominent include the paved Aliso Creek Trail, which travels the length of the park, and the unpaved Wood Canyon Trail which terminates at Canyon View Park in Aliso Viejo. The Aliso Creek Trail continues north along the creek towards Laguna Hills as a paved walking/biking path. The more enclosed and shaded Wood Canyon is a popular location for horseback riding; the hills bordering Wood Canyon include many mountain biking paths, such as the Mathis Canyon and Rock-It trails, ranging in difficulty from beginner to advanced. Many of the names for smaller trails in the park are from the Acjachemen language, including Aswut ("golden eagle"), Toovet ("brush rabbit"), Alwut ("crow") and Hunwut ("black bear").

Dripping Cave is a popular beginner's hike and was once used as a hideout by local cattle and stagecoach thieves during the 1800s. The Aliso Summit and West Ridge trails hug the ridge lines on the park's eastern and western boundaries, respectively.

== Geology ==
Aliso Canyon began forming about 1.2 million years ago, as Aliso Creek carved its way through the hills at the same time the hills experienced geological uplift. During the pluvial Ice Age, ending about 10,000 years ago, Orange County had a much wetter climate and sea levels were lower; the valley is a relic of a time when much more water flowed through Aliso Creek as it cut its way to the sea. At the end of the Ice Age sea levels rose, backfilling the canyon and creating a shallow fjord. Sediment deposited by Aliso Creek slowly filled the canyon to depths of 13 to 36 feet (4.0 to 11.0 m) and created the flat valley floor seen today. The creek remains as an underfit stream whose present size, in today's semiarid climate, appears too small to have cut the canyon through which it flows.

The San Joaquin Hills consist of marine sedimentary rock that originally lay at the bottom of the Pacific Ocean before being uplifted above sea level. As the creek cut through the hills it exposed strata of the Monterey Formation dating to the Miocene (5-23 million years ago) and the Eocene (34–56 million years ago). Limestone outcrops in the northeast section of the park, part of the Pecten Reef, have yielded thousands of fossils including Miocene dolphin and whales, preserved invertebrates, plankton, bryozoa, and red, blue and brown algae. Much of the scientific understanding for evolution, paleoenvironments and paleoclimates during the Miocene period in Orange County is based on the specimens collected from the Pecten Reef.

== Ecology ==
The plant and animal species in the park are split between three major plant communities covering approximately equal acreage within the park. These are coastal sage scrub, chaparral, and annual grassland. Chaparral often co-exists with sage scrub on the hills and slopes of the park; mostly in the southern extreme of the park. The grassland covers the valley floor, with riparian zones along the park's perennial streams. The park, a designated wildlife sanctuary, protects the habitat of 137 species of nesting and migratory birds.

=== Plants ===
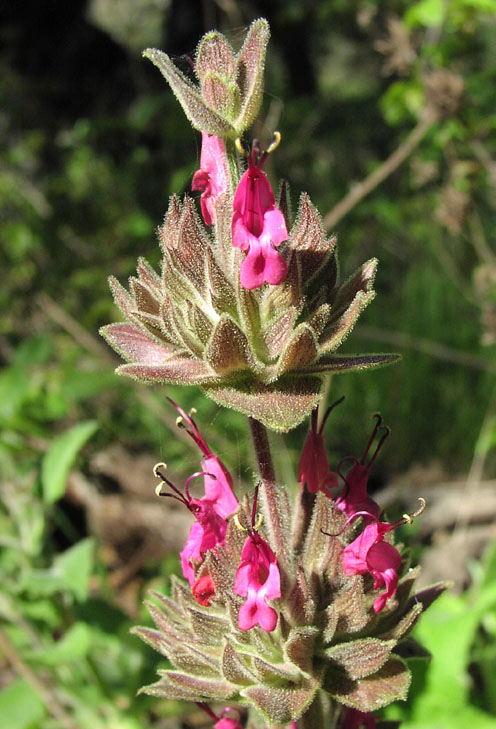
Hummingbird sage is native to southern California and flourishes in the park.

The Aliso Canyon bottom is seasonal grassland, which flourishes in spring and diminishes by late summer or fall. The park protects habitat for a number of sensitive plant species, including many-stemmed dudleya, Pomona rattleweed, Orange County Turkish rugging, Palmer's grapplinghook, aphanisma, Laguna Beach dudleya, scrub oak, western dichondra, hummingbird sage, ocean spray, and crown-beard. Oak and sycamore are found in Wood Canyon, and marshes and grassy wetlands are found along Aliso Creek. Native grassland ecosystems in the less visited south-western portion of the park are considered largely intact.

=== Animals ===
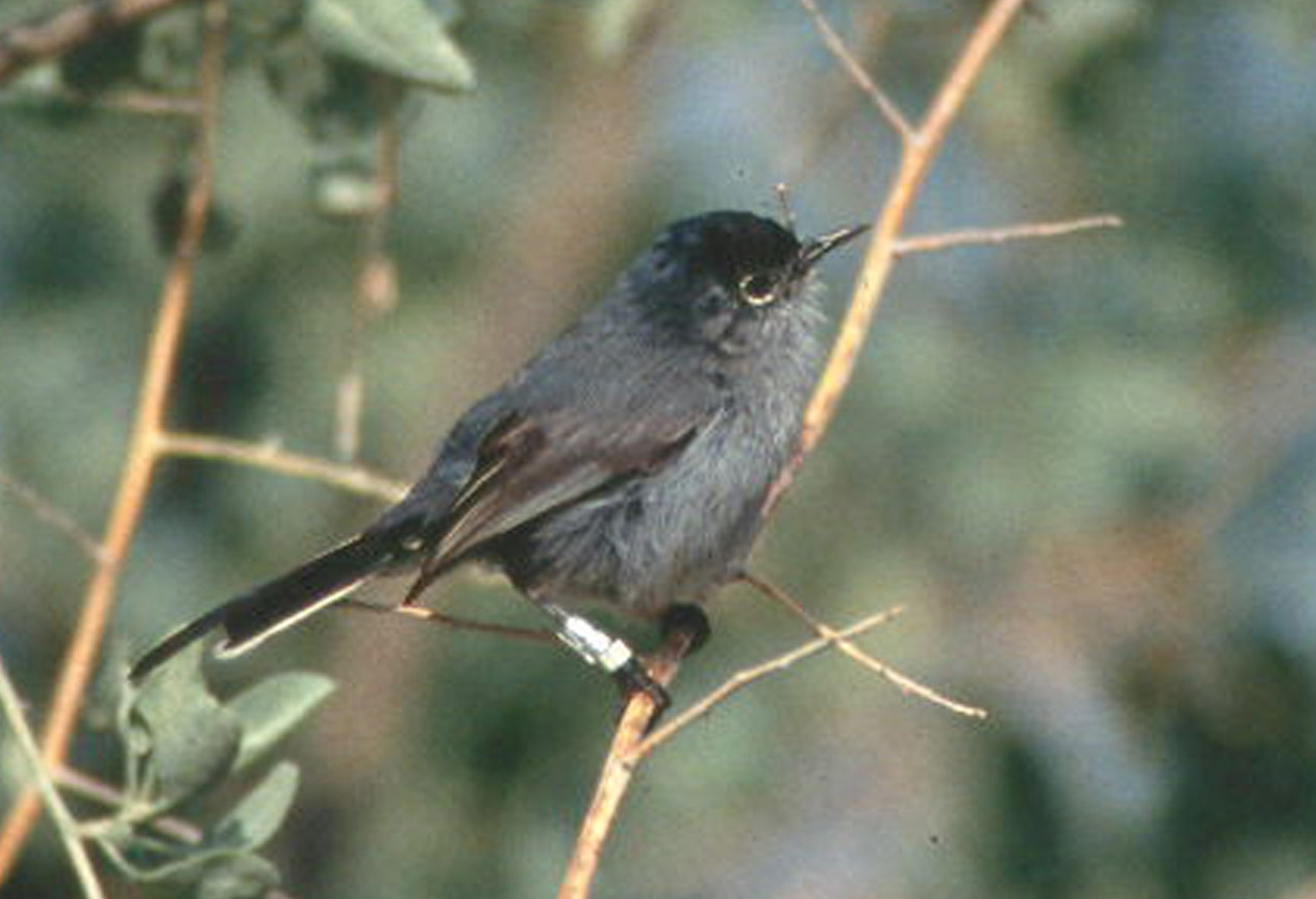
The California gnatcatcher inhabits undergrowth throughout the park.

The park is one of the largest sanctuaries in coastal Orange County for mammals such as coyotes and bobcats. Several sensitive bird, small mammal, and reptile species find refuge in the park, including California gnatcatcher, pond turtle, San Diego horned lizard, orange-throated whiptail, Pacific pocket mouse, great egret, white-tailed kite, northern harrier, sharp-shinned hawk, Cooper's hawk, ferruginous hawk, cactus wren, yellow warbler, and yellow-breasted chat. Up to five bald eagles have been counted in Aliso Canyon, and peregrine falcons have been sighted flying along the canyon walls.

=== Fish ===
Aliso Creek was formerly a major steelhead stream. Dam construction, upstream channelization, pollution, invasive plant species such as giant reed, as well as severe erosion problems that have in some places undermined the Aliso Creek Trail, have essentially eliminated steelhead with only occasional anecdotal sightings. Near the mouth, there was also a large population of tidewater goby (an endemic species to California) which have largely disappeared with human development. Carp of up to 18 inches (1.5 feet, 45 cm) have been taken from the creek; they are among the few fish species that thrive in the warm, silty and nutrient-rich waters.

== Environmental issues ==
Among the most long-running problems afflicting Aliso and Wood Canyons is the presence of invasive species, many introduced by former ranching activities, and later, exotic ornamental plants imported for gardens. Plants such as giant reed (Arundo donax) and pampas grass crowd out native vegetation and provide less nutritional value to animals that frequent the park. Giant reed in particular has invaded many riparian zones along Aliso Creek and reduced the biodiversity of these habitats. There are also numerous invasive animal species, including the Brown-headed cowbird, a brood parasite which lays its eggs in native birds' nests. Recent mitigation projects have utilized herbicides and trapping to reduce the population of invasive species within the canyon.

Another issue affecting the park are hikers and mountain bikers who create unauthorized trails as shortcuts. Even before the opening of the park in 1990, motorcyclists would frequently trespass inside the boundaries, damaging sensitive habitat and slopes; in part because of this, motorized vehicles with the exception of maintenance and emergency workers are banned in the park. Rangers regularly block and re-plant unofficial trails, and visitors are urged to stay on the designated trails to prevent erosion.

=== Erosion ===
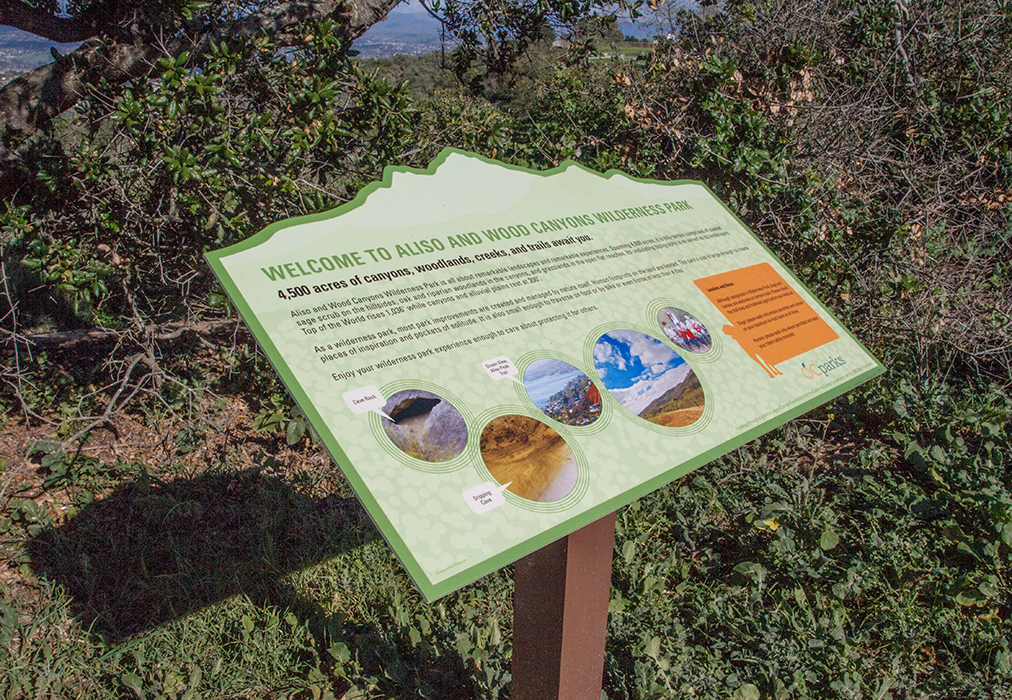
Sign in Aliso and Wood Canyons Park

The Aliso Wastewater Management Agency (AWMA) was created in 1974 to reclaim domestic sewage for irrigation; a water treatment facility was established inside the future park as the overflow into Aliso Creek when the volume of reclaimed water exceeds demand in nearby cities. Since then, the population of south Orange County has grown faster than projected, increasing the volume of wastewater entering Aliso Creek and causing erosion problems inside the park.

In the 1990s Orange County and the Mission Viejo Company constructed a dam on Aliso Creek inside the park, which was intended to control erosion and help restore riparian habitat. About 10,000 trees were planted to enhance habitat conditions. This project was known as the Aliso Creek Wildlife Habitat Enhancement Project (ACWHEP). However, after flooding damages in 1997-98 the dam was severely damaged, and has led to significant degradation of the river bed such that the creek now flows in a gully 10 to 20 feet (3.0 to 6.1 m) below the surrounding land. This has caused further environmental problems along the creek, and dried up former riparian habitat and wetlands.

Further efforts to control erosion along the creek in the park, both to restore habitat and protect nearby waste-water pipelines, have been controversial as they would severely impact the existing habitat in the canyon. A 2008 proposal by the U.S. Army Corps of Engineers, would have "locked" the creek in place by building 20 drop structures and underground concrete walls to counter channel migration. The works would have involved moving as much as 1,000,000 cubic yards (760,000 m^{3}) of earth and affected 70 acres (28 ha) of the park. In 2009 a study submitted to the City of Laguna Beach suggested that the creek should be allowed to reach natural equilibrium with its surroundings, as additional human interference would likely lead to further unexpected damages. Due to environmental concerns, no such project has been attempted to date.

== See also ==
- Crystal Cove State Park
