= Sulphur Creek Dam =

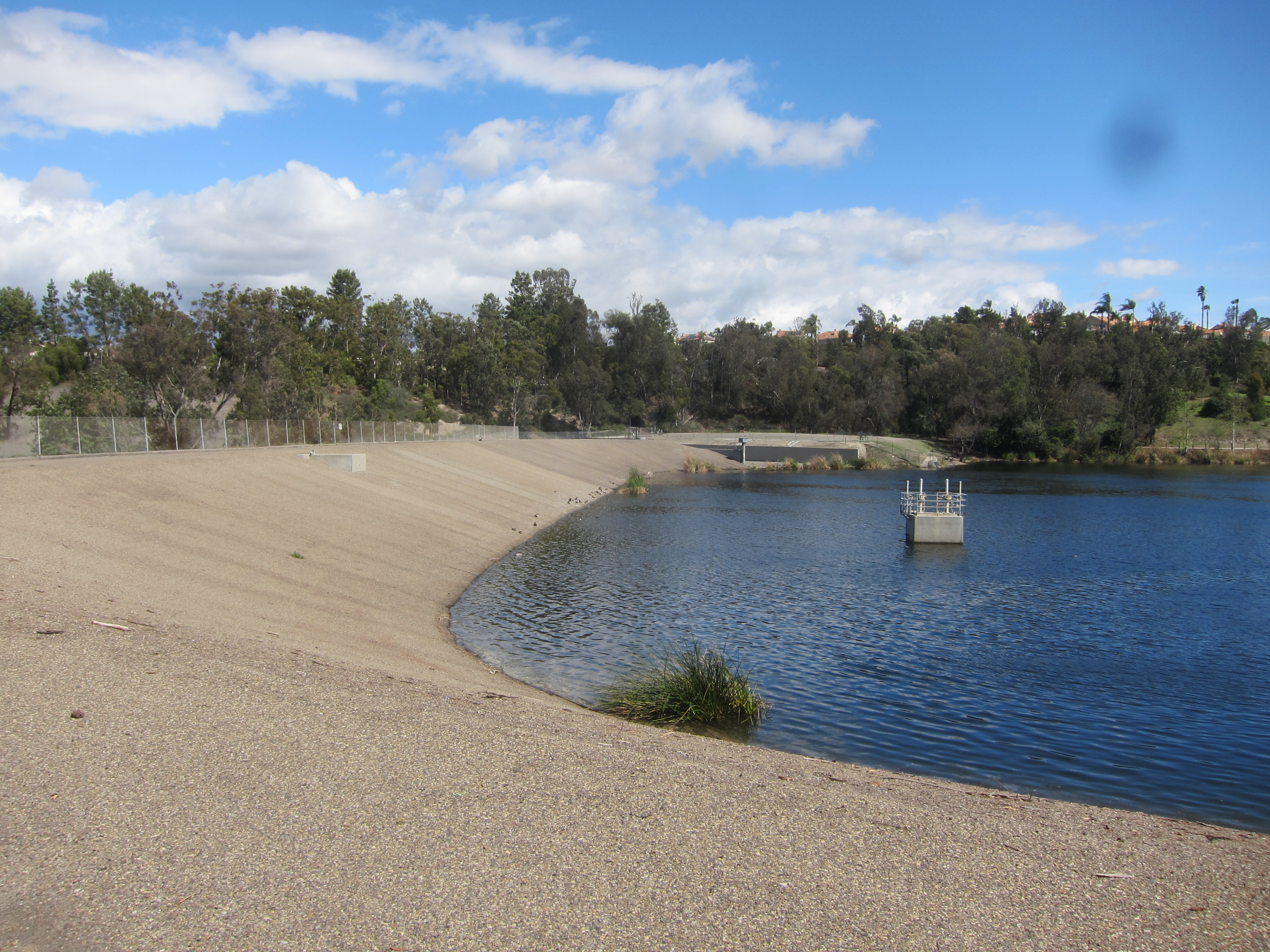
- Upstream face of the dam and Laguna Niguel Lake

- Location within California
- Country: United States
- Location: Laguna Niguel, Orange County, California
- Coordinates: 33°32′59″N 117°42′22″W
- Opening date: 1966; 60 years ago
- Owner: Orange County Flood Control District

Dam and spillways
- Type of dam: Concrete-faced earthfill
- Impounds: Sulphur Creek
- Height: 42 ft (13 m)
- Length: 485 ft (148 m)
- Width (crest): 25 ft (7.6 m)
- Width (base): 180 ft (55 m)
- Dam volume: 150,000 yd^{3} (110,000 m^{3})
- Spillway type: Uncontrolled concrete overflow

Reservoir
- Creates: Sulphur Creek Reservoir
- Total capacity: 1,065 acre⋅ft (1,314,000 m^{3}) (max); 520 acre⋅ft (640,000 m^{3}) (conservation)
- Catchment area: 4.8 sq mi (12 km^{2})
- Surface area: 44 acres (18 ha)
- Maximum water depth: 25 ft (7.6 m)

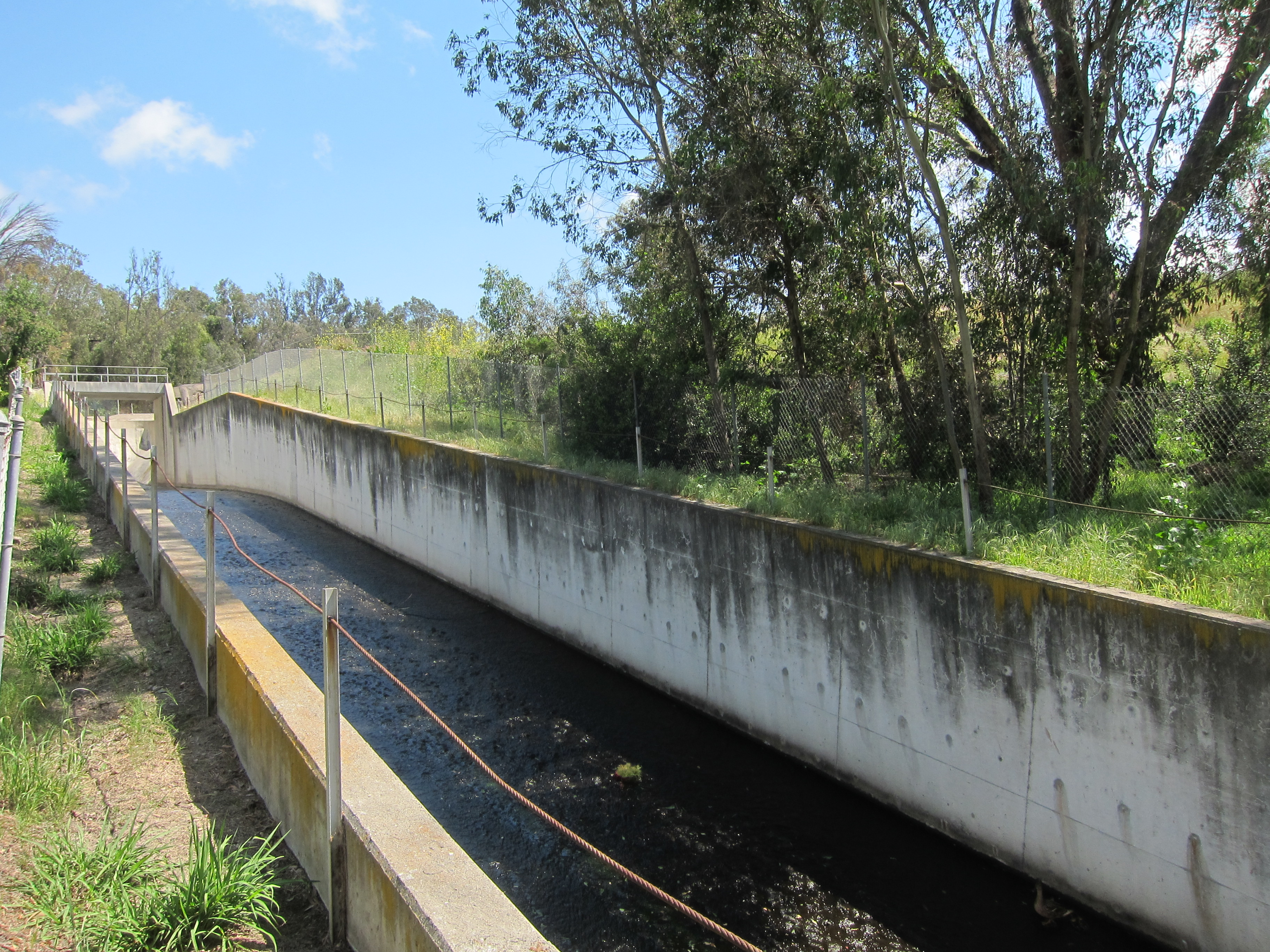
View of the dam spillway

Sulphur Creek Dam is a dam across Sulphur Creek in Orange County, California. The dam creates Laguna Niguel Lake and is entirely within the city of Laguna Niguel. The reservoir is used for water reclamation storage and recreation, and is the main attraction of Laguna Niguel Regional Park, which surrounds it.

== History ==
Construction of Sulphur Creek Dam was completed in 1966 by the Moulton Niguel Water District. The lake was known as Sulphur Creek Reservoir and used to store treated reclaimed water for irrigation. In 1970 the Orange County Flood Control District purchased the dam and reservoir in conjunction with the city of Laguna Niguel for use as a park. The reservoir was stocked with game fish and opened to public use in 1973, and a boat dock and concessions established in 1976. The dam has suffered from siltation issues caused in part by urban runoff in Sulphur Creek which brings mud and debris into the reservoir. The silt accumulation led to a lake "turnover" in 1976 which stirred up debris in the lake, killing over 2,000 fish. Another such event happened in 1981, killing 1,500 fish.

In 1989 the county spent $1.6 million to refurbish the dam and lake area. The lake was drained and about 10 feet (3.0 m) of silt were removed, increasing the water depth from 16 feet (4.9 m) to 25 feet (7.6 m). The dam was found to be in deteriorating condition and required concrete resurfacing and the replacement of the outlet gate.

== Specifications ==
The dam is an earthfill structure 42 feet (13 m) high and 485 feet (148 m) long with a concrete upstream face, and contains 150,000 cubic yards (110,000 m^{3}) of material. There is a 24-inch (61 cm) outlet gate on the east side of the dam, to release water into Sulphur Creek. The spillway is also located on the east side of the dam and consists of a concrete overflow section and stilling basin. The reservoir has a normal storage capacity of 520 acre⋅ft (640,000 m^{3}), and a maximum capacity of 1,065 acre⋅ft (1,314,000 m^{3}).

== Recreation ==
The reservoir covers 44 acres (18 ha) and is used for fishing, boating and camping, as well as the Laguna Niguel Fourth of July fireworks show. The California Department of Fish and Wildlife stocks the lake with catfish, bass, blue gill, and trout. The dam and reservoir are surrounded by walking and biking trails; however, public access to the top of the dam is prohibited.

== See also ==
- List of dams and reservoirs in California
