= Salt Creek (Orange County) =

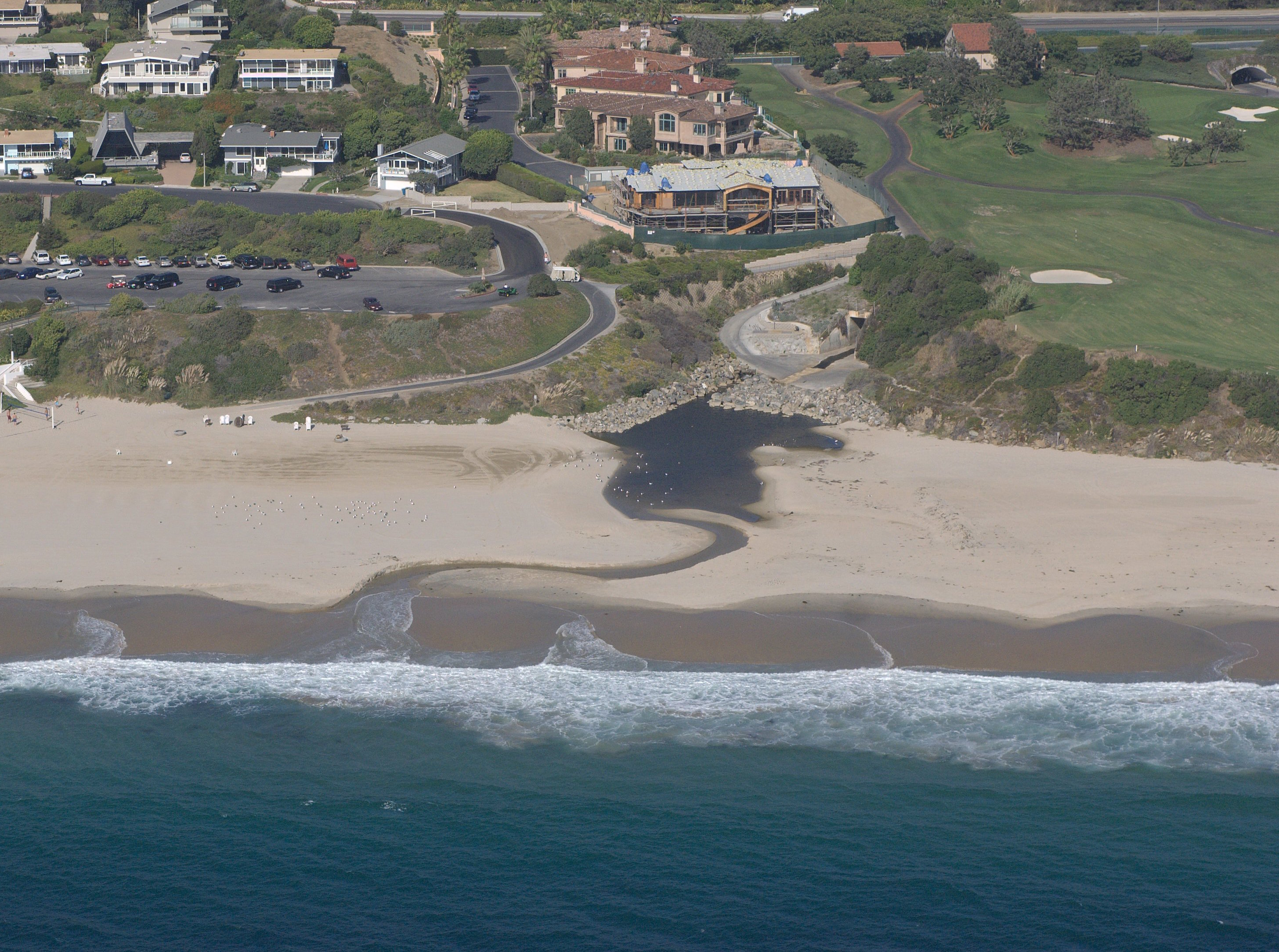
- Mouth of Salt Creek at Dana Point
- Etymology: "Arroyo Salado" (Salt Creek)

Location
- Country: United States
- State: California
- Counties: Orange County
- Cities: Laguna Niguel, Dana Point, San Juan Capistrano

Physical characteristics
- Source
  - location: Orange County, California
  - coordinates: 33°31′23″N 117°41′25″W
- Mouth: Pacific Ocean
  - location: Laguna Beach, California
  - coordinates: 33°28′53″N 117°43′31″W
  - elevation: 0 ft (0 m)
- Length: 4 mi (6.4 km)
- Basin size: 6.1 mi^{2} (16 km^{2})
- Discharge
  - location: Pacific Ocean at Salt Creek County Beach
  - average: 2.2 cu ft/s (0.062 m^{3}/s)

Salt Creek is a small coastal stream in southern Orange County, California in the United States. About 4 miles (6.4 km) long, the creek drains 6.1 square miles (16 km^{2}) in parts of the cities of Laguna Niguel and Dana Point. The creek begins in Laguna Niguel and flows west and south through a narrow canyon, partly in the Salt Corridor Regional Park. It empties into the Pacific Ocean at Salt Creek County Beach in Dana Point.

== Geography ==
According to U.S. Geological Survey (USGS) topographic maps, Salt Creek historically began in the southern San Joaquin Hills near what is now the intersection of Golden Lantern and Marina Hills Drive in Laguna Niguel. The upper half of the creek, now filled in and graded over with suburban residential development, ran southwest through a small valley along present-day Marina Hills Drive then south along Niguel Road. It emerges from an underground culvert at the intersection of Niguel Road and Club House Drive and is joined from the east by a tributary from San Juan Canyon. Crossing under Niguel Road, it flows south through a natural channel in the Salt Corridor Regional Park. The Salt Creek Trail parallels the creek from here until the mouth.

The creek crosses beneath Camino del Avion in a culvert, and enters the Monarch Beach Golf Links in Dana Point. It is joined from the right by the Arroyo Salada Storm Channel, which drains from the vicinity of Crown Valley Parkway and Hillhurst Drive in Laguna Niguel. In the golf course, it is joined from the left by an unnamed tributary that drains much of western Dana Point. It then enters a long underground culvert beneath Pacific Coast Highway, emerging at a concrete spillway near the north end of Salt Creek Beach.

Salt Creek drains one of the smallest watersheds in the county, at 6.1 square miles (16 km^{2}). About two-thirds of the watershed is in Laguna Niguel, with the remainder in Dana Point. Situated within the southern San Joaquin Hills, the Salt Creek watershed is located east of the Aliso Creek watershed and west of the San Juan Creek watershed.

== Geology ==
The Salt Creek watershed was shaped by seismic uplift of the San Joaquin Hills starting about 1.2 million years ago. Sulphur Creek, which now flows northwest into Aliso Creek, may have once flowed down what is now the Arroyo Salada channel into Salt Creek, but at some point in geologic time was captured to the north and resultantly makes a sharp turn north of what is now Crown Valley Parkway and Niguel Road. A low divide about 80 feet (24 m) high now divides the two drainage basins.

== History ==
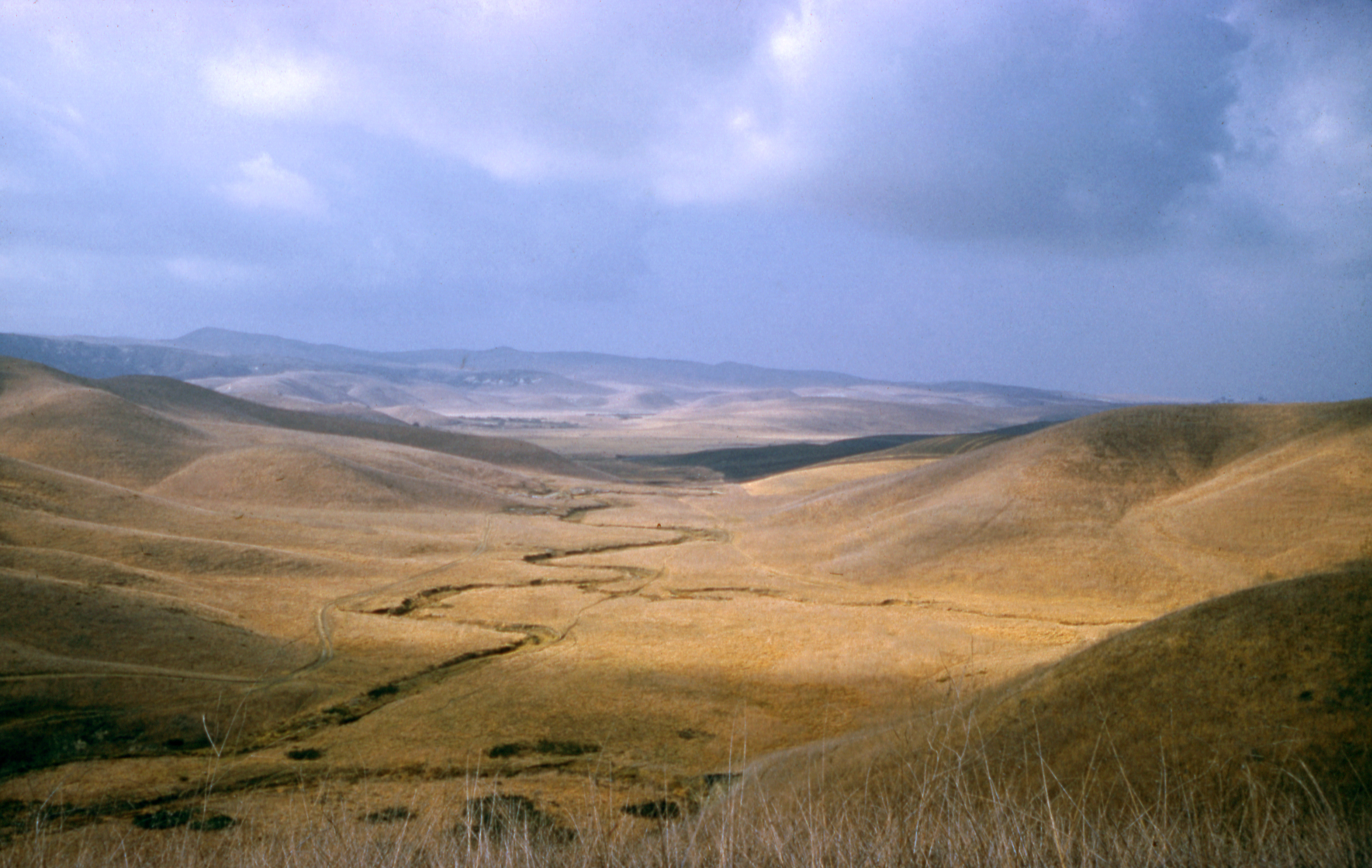
Salt Creek in Laguna Niguel (1959), prior to its major alterations.

Like other Orange County creeks south of Aliso Creek and north of San Mateo Creek, the Salt Creek watershed was once part of the territory of the nomadic Acjachemen Native American group, which was later renamed the Juaneño by Spanish missionaries when they founded Mission San Juan Capistrano at the confluence of San Juan and Trabuco Creeks farther south, close to the group's main population center. It is possible that Juaneño villages once were located along the lower channel of Salt Creek, as springs feeding the creek provided a small but stable year round flow. The creek was labeled "Cañada Salada" (Salt Canyon) or "Cañada Niguel" in a map dating to 1858.

From the 1960s to the 1990s, residential development filled most of the available land within the Salt Creek watershed. Mountaintops were flattened and dumped into small canyons to create level land for tract housing and roads. Despite that, the Salt Creek Canyon remained relatively undeveloped, except for a golf course - the Monarch Beach Golf Links - at its southern end, and a golf course surrounding the Arroyo Salada Storm Channel's mainstem. As recently as the 1970s, the lowermost stretch of the Salt Creek Canyon was still in existence. This part of the canyon was also destroyed by landfill for the purpose of building more houses and the Pacific Coast Highway.

== Effects of urbanization ==
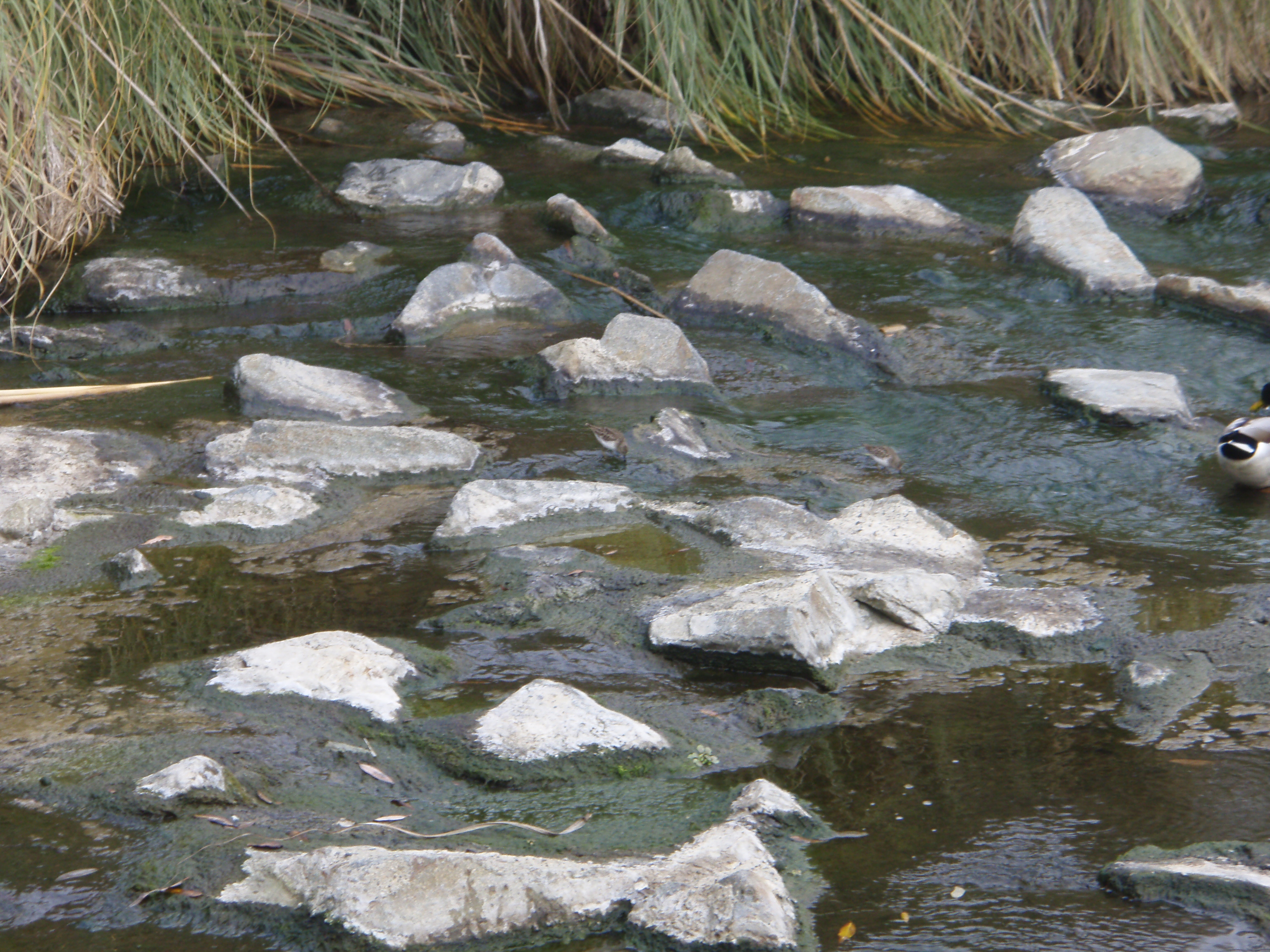
Salt Creek just before it is diverted into the culvert near its mouth

Due to channelization during urban development, the source of Salt Creek, once a small marshy wetland, is no longer where it was before the area was developed in the 1990s. Between the original source and Salt Corridor Regional Park, water flows are channeled into storm drain K01P07. The Orange County Department of Public Works manages the storm channels and considers the modern "Salt Creek Channel" to start from the area of Chapparosa Park in Laguna Niguel, including part of what the USGS labels as San Juan Canyon. The tributary entering within Monarch Beach golf course is now K01P01, the Niguel Shores Storm Drain, and the Arroyo Salada is now K01S02, the Arroyo Salada Storm Channel.

The dry season flow of the stream is almost entirely composed of urban runoff. The creek carries pollutants and bacteria into coastal waters off the popular recreational areas of Salt Creek Beach and Monarch Beach. In 2007 this was estimated at 500 to 900 US gallons (1.9 to 3.4 m^{3}) per minute. Both Laguna Niguel and Dana Point implemented measures to reduce pollution from urban runoff, including stream and wetland restoration, drain filters, and irrigation runoff reduction. However, the beaches continued to experience water quality issues.

In 2004, the city of Dana Point completed the $6.7 million Salt Creek Ozone Treatment Plant, located near Pacific Coast Highway just above Salt Creek's ocean outlet. Dry weather runoff from the creek is captured, filtered for garbage and coarse solids, then treated with filtration and ozonation to reduce bacterial levels. The plant is designed to treat 1,000 US gallons (3.8 m^{3}) per minute and was originally intended to function only during the dry season between April and October. The city has since opted to run the plant year-round, only shutting it down in anticipation of excessive storm flows.

== See also ==
- List of rivers of Orange County, California
- List of rivers of California
