= Laguna Hills Mall =

Defunct mall in Orange County, California, U.S.

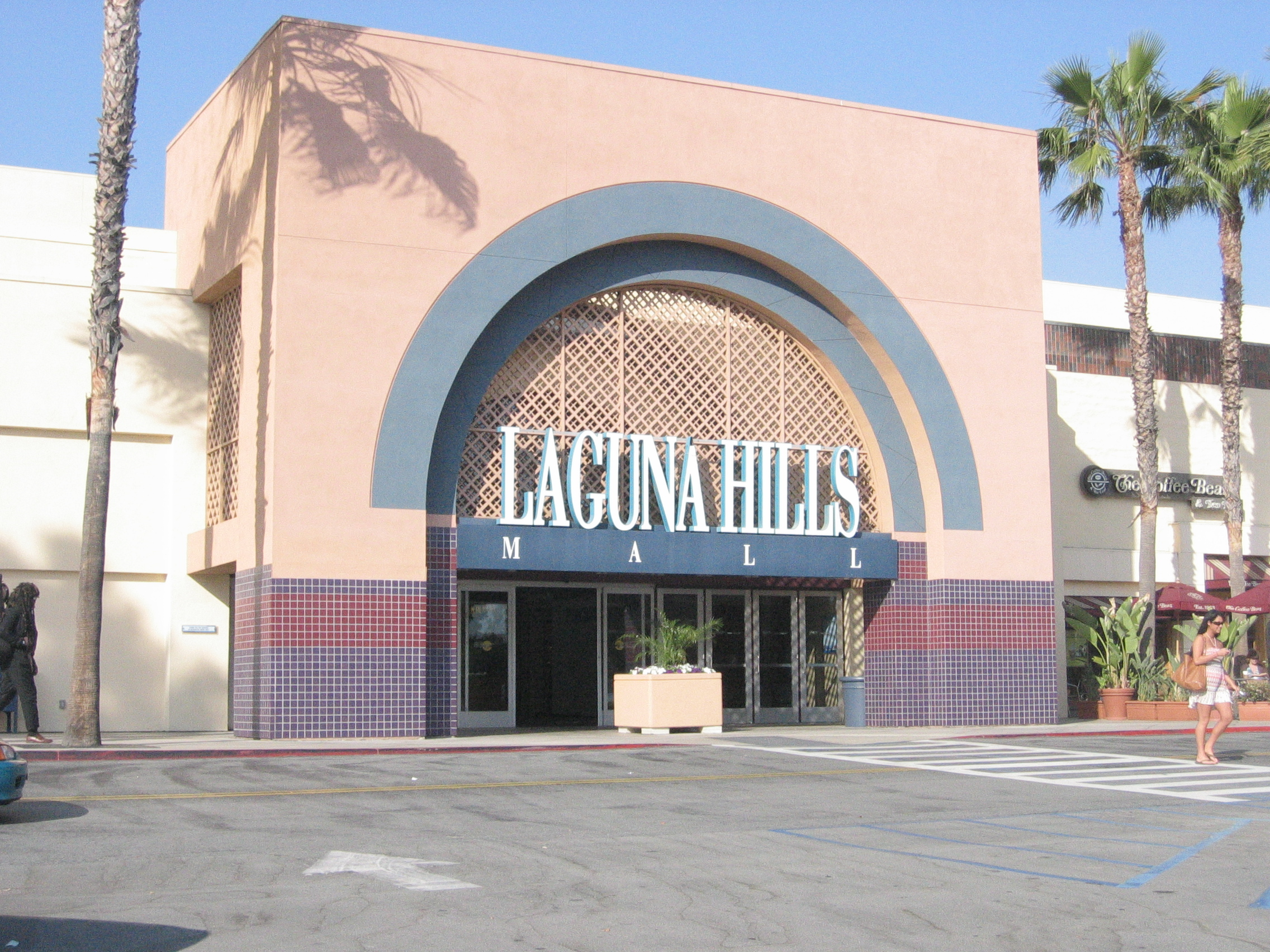
- Entrance to the mall
- Location: Laguna Hills, California, United States
- Coordinates: 33.61081°N 117.70709°W
- Address: 24155 Laguna Hills Mall
- Opened: April 1973
- Closed: December 31, 2018
- Developer: The Hahn Company and Rossmoor Corporation
- Manager: Merlone Geier Partners
- Architect: Edward Killingsworth
- Num. of stores: 120 at peak
- Num. of anchor tenants: 3 (3 vacant)
- Floor area: 867,000 square feet (80,500 m^{2})
- Floors: 1

Laguna Hills Mall was a shopping mall in Laguna Hills, California, United States, in southern Orange County that is being redeveloped into a lifestyle center by the owners as Village at Laguna Hills. The enclosed mall closed on December 31, 2018, and was completely demolished in 2023. The exterior stores remain open. A hotel, entertainment venues, apartments, office spaces and a community park will replace the mall.

== History ==
=== 1973 launch ===
The mall opened in phases starting in Spring 1973 with a 214,000-square-foot (19,900 m^{2}) Sears as the first anchor open, followed by a 50,000 sq ft (4,600 m^{2}) two-level Buffums on September 5, 1973. The Broadway followed, opening in August 1975, and J.C. Penney in 1976. Up to that point, the mall had cost an estimated $50 million to build and contained 393,000 sq ft (36,500 m^{2}) of retail space in Phase I with 55 stores and 832,000 sq ft (77,300 m^{2}) of retail space with 83 stores in Phase II.

=== 1990s ===
In May 1991, Buffums closed due to the chain being liquidated and three years later, the store's second level was converted into an upstairs food court. The food court, which operated from 1994 to 2011, was the only part of the general mall on the second level. The Broadway converted into Macy's in May 1996.

=== 2010s ===
In May 2013, Merlone Geier Partners purchased the property from Simon Property Group. A year later, Merlone Geier purchased the Sears anchor store. Sears (the mall's original anchor store) closed in July 2014. Renovations started in 2016.

=== Re-branding ===
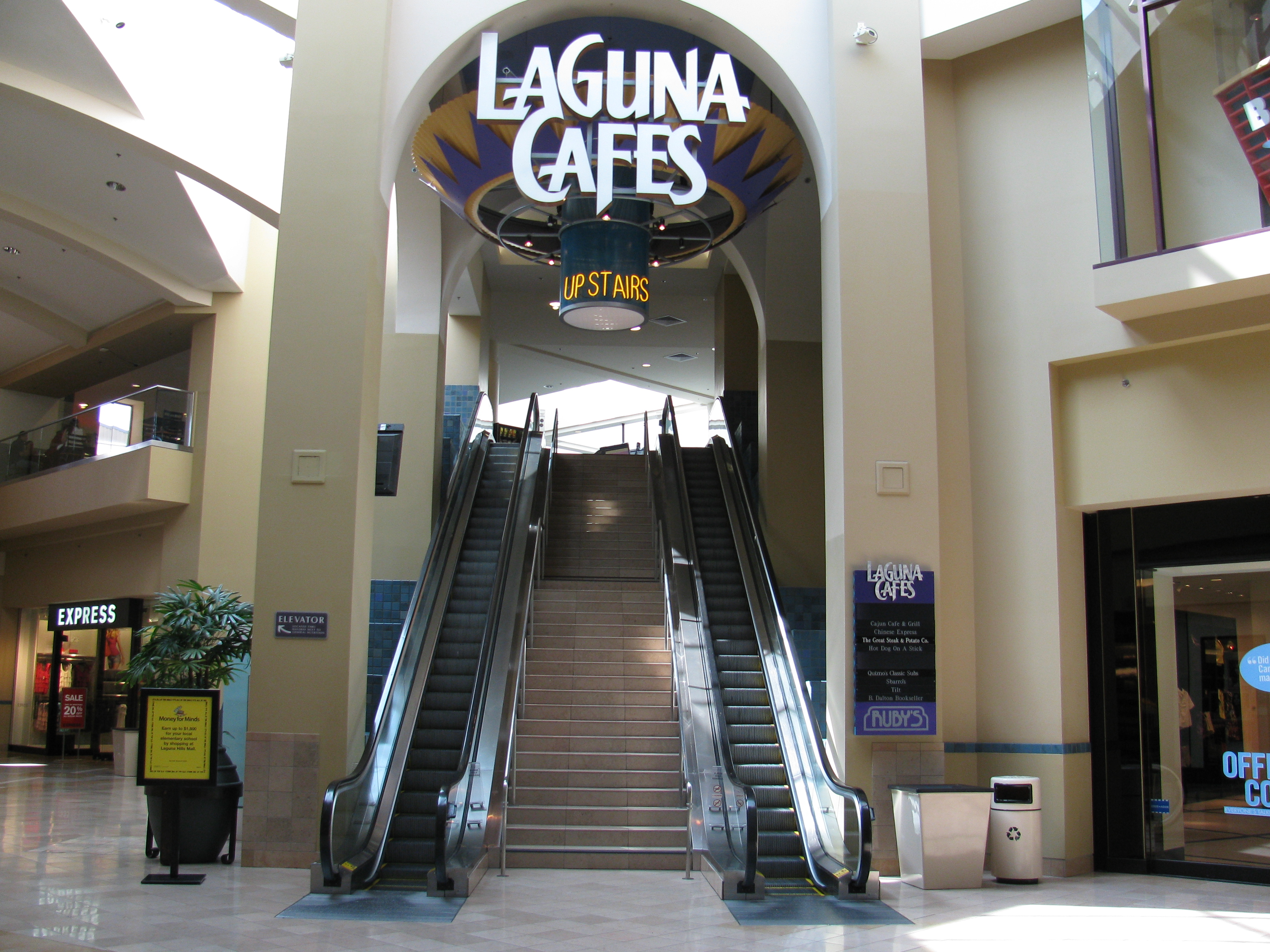
Former Laguna Cafes food court entrance at Laguna Hills Mall.

The Laguna Hills Mall is scheduled to be renamed "Five Lagunas". According to Laguna Hills' city documents, the renovations include pedestrian plazas, new retail sections, a 988-unit apartment complex, a multi-screen movie theater, new signage, and a 1,500-space parking structure.

Macy's closed in March 2018 as part of a plan to close 11 stores nationwide, which halted construction on its end of the mall and left JCPenney as the only remaining anchor.

JCPenney closed in October 2018 which left the mall with no anchors.

The mall closed on December 31, 2018. The exterior stores remained open.

=== Plans for Five Lagunas ===
At a November 2019 City Council meeting, Merlone-Geier unveiled two major changes to the previous plans proposed since 2016: adding housing and reduction of retail space. Previously, the proposal called for 880,000 square feet (82,000 m^{2}) of retail space and 988 residential units. Another reduction was made in office space to make room for the seasonal events. The revised proposal included a new 110,000-square-foot (10,000 m^{2}) cinema, 225,000 sq ft (20,900 m^{2}) to 300,000 sq ft (28,000 m^{2}) of retail, a 125-room hotel, 390,000 sq ft (36,000 m^{2}) to 520,000 sq ft (48,000 m^{2}) of office space, two three-story parking structures, and a potential of 1,200 to 1,500 more apartments. As of June, 2026 nothing has been built on the site.

As of July 2026, the redevelopment plan has shifted from retail based to housing, a hotel and a park to "promote a sense of community.
