= Laguna Niguel Lake =

Artificial lake in Laguna Niguel, California

- Sulphur Creek Reservoir; Cañada Salada; Arroyo Salada
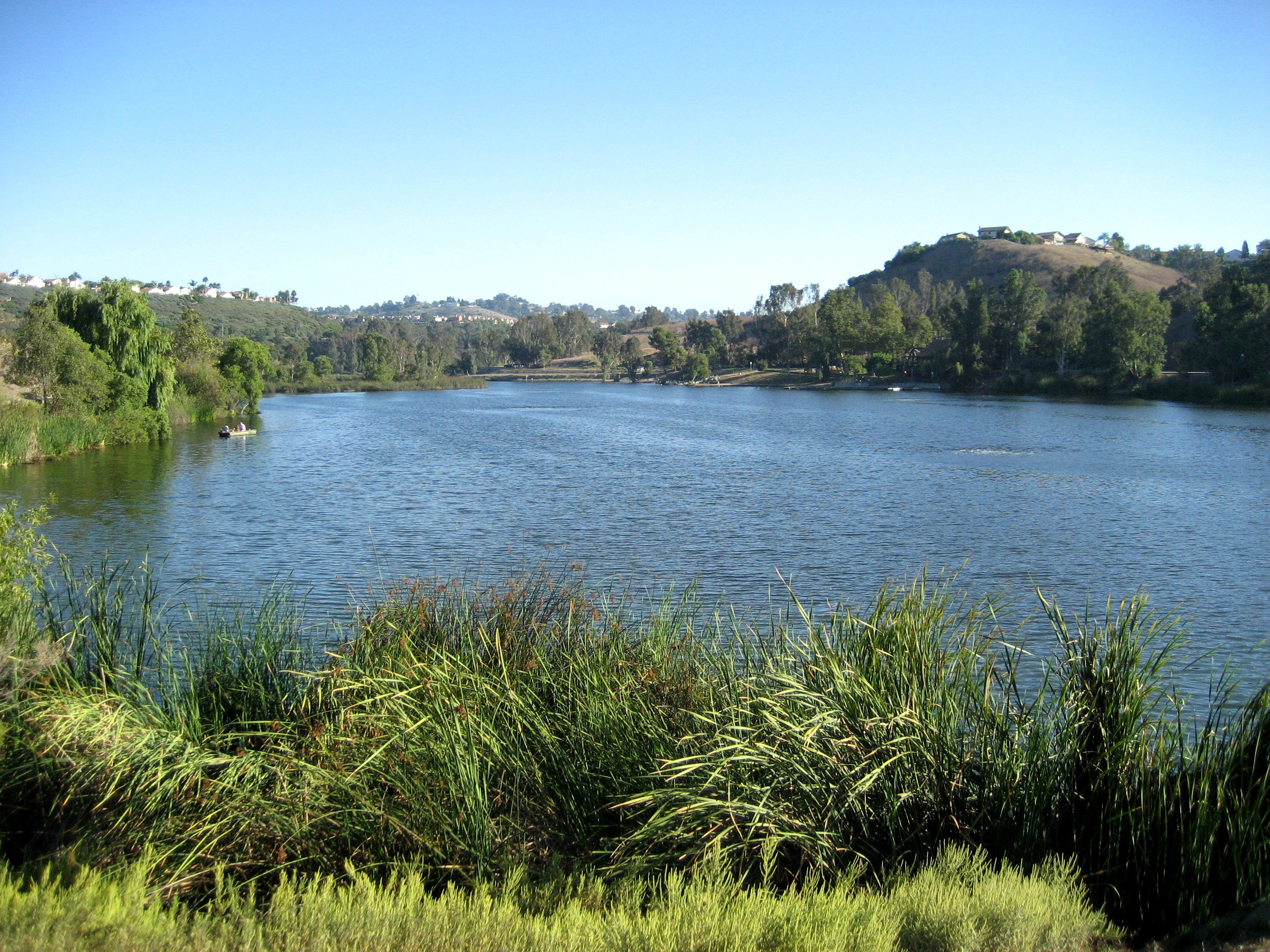

- Location within California Location within the United States
- Location: Laguna Niguel, California
- Coordinates: 33°32′48″N 117°42′19″W
- Type: reservoir
- Primary inflows: Sulphur Creek
- Basin countries: United States
- Surface area: 44 acres (18 ha)
- Surface elevation: 190 ft (58 m)

Laguna Niguel Lake, formerly known as Sulphur Creek Reservoir, is an artificial 44-acre (180,000 m^{2}) fishing and recreational lake in Laguna Niguel, California. It is created by the Sulphur Creek Dam, which was completed in 1966. It is located at 33°32′59″N 117°42′22″W and is 190 feet (58 m) above sea level. It is fed from two sources, one of which is Sulphur Creek itself and the other, a storm drain. It is accessed from La Paz Road, which runs along its east shore. Surrounding the reservoir is the Laguna Niguel Regional Park. In addition, within the lake on the large island is a protected bird sanctuary.

There is a fee to access the park and lake which costs $3 on weekdays, $5 on weekends, and $7 on holidays.

== Recreational uses ==
Laguna Niguel Lake is used for fishing and has been stocked with catfish, bass, blue gill, and trout. In addition to fishing it is used by the Laguna Niguel Lightning youth baseball team for conditioning purposes.

== Fishing information ==
Laguna Niguel Lake is a very popular rainbow trout fishing location during the season (November–April). The lake became famous within the fishing community for stocking "wild raised" Utah "Hook-Jaws" exceeding sizes of 15 pounds (6.8 kg). As of November 2007 the lake stopped stocking these Utah trout and instead received their stockings from the Mt. Lassen fish hatchery. The lake has recently received new operators who are bringing back these famous Utah raised rainbow trout come November 2010. The limit for trout is 5 fish per stringer, and no trout may be released unless caught on barbless artificials or flies only. Additional fish may be kept with another fishing permit purchase. The current lake trout record is 15.5 pounds (7.0 kg) caught by Dan Ingouf.

The lake is owned by Orange County, and is leased out to Rick Mendoza – one of the original operators – and Darren Colbert who are in charge of the fishing and concession.

The concessionaire at Laguna Niguel lake closed in November 2015 and the County of Orange took over the maintenance and management of the lake. A California State fishing license is required for anyone 16 years of age or over and all Department of Fish and Wildlife rules apply. There is no fee to fish, but there is a vehicle entrance fee of $3 per entrance on weekdays and $5 per entrance on weekends. Rentals and bait are no longer available and no watercraft are permitted on the lake. Fishing is from the shoreline and in designated fishing areas only. The County will continue to stock the lake seasonally with fish and a schedule is posted on line at <ocparks.com>. Park operating hours are 7am-9pm during daylight saving time and 7am-6pm during standard time.

== See also ==
- List of dams and reservoirs in California
- List of lakes in California
