= Rancho Niguel =

Mexican land grant

Coordinates: 33.560°N 117.710°W

Rancho Niguel was a 13,316-acre (53.89 km^{2}) Mexican land grant in the San Joaquin Hills, within present-day Orange County, California.

It was granted in 1842 by Governor Juan B. Alvarado to Juan Avila. The rancho was named for a local Indian village called "Niguili." The grant extended along the Pacific coast from Laguna Canyon and Laguna Beach, past Aliso Creek to Dana Point and San Juan Creek. The rancho encompassed those present-day places and Laguna Niguel, Aliso Viejo, and Laguna Hills.

== History ==
Juan Avila (1812–1889) was the son of Antonio Ygnacio Avila, grantee of Rancho Sausal Redondo. In 1832, Juan Avila married Maria Soledad Thomasa Capistrano Yorba (–1867). He and Soledad Yorba de Avila had three children who survived to adulthood: Rosa Modesta, who married Pablo Pryor; Guadalupe who married Marco Forster; and Manuel Donanciano who married Delfina Rodriguez. Marco Forster (1839–1904) was the son of John (Don Juan) Forster, owner of the adjacent Rancho Trabuco and Rancho Misión Vieja. Juan Avila was granted the three square league Rancho Niguel in 1842. He was a "judge of the plains" at Los Angeles in 1844, and justice of the peace at San Juan Capistrano in 1846.

With the cession of California to the United States following the Mexican-American War, the 1848 Treaty of Guadalupe Hidalgo provided that the land grants would be honored. As required by the Land Act of 1851, a claim for Rancho Niguel was filed with the Public Land Commission in 1852, and the grant was patented to Juan Avila in 1873.

Juan Avila retained ownership of Rancho Niguel until 1865, when after the droughts of 1863-64, he sold the property to John Forster. Soledad Yorba de Avila died of smallpox in 1867. Rancho Niguel passed from John Forster to Marco Forster to Lewis Moulton and his partner, Jean Pierre Daguerre, who obtained it in 1895.

Lewis Fenno Moulton (1854–1938), the son of J. Tilden Moulton and Charlotte Harding Fenno, was born in Chicago, and after his father's death, the family moved to Boston. In 1874 Moulton came to California via Panama. He worked on Rancho San Joaquin, and subsequently went into the sheep raising business for several years. After his first purchase in 1895 of Rancho Niguel (which adjoined Rancho San Joaquin), additional property was acquired and eventually the ranch consisted of 22,000 acres (89 km^{2}).

Jean Pierre Daguerre (1856–1911), a native of Hasparren, France, came to Los Angeles in 1874 with the French Basque Amestoy family and worked on the Amestoy's ranch near Gardena. In 1882, Daguerre formed a partnership with Marco Forster. In 1886, Daguerre married Maria Eugenia Duguet, who came from France on the same boat as Daguerre. After dissolving the partnership with Marco Forster, Daguerre formed a partnership with Lewis Moulton, and owned a one-third interest in Rancho Niguel.

Over the years, portions of the ranch were sold and became Leisure World, Laguna Hills and Laguna Niguel.

In 1976, the Mission Viejo Company purchased the remaining 6,600 acres to create a new planned community – Aliso Viejo.

Aliso Canyon was spared from development when about 40 land parcels were acquired by the county for use as a park, the largest in 1979 when the Mission Viejo Company donated 3,400 acres (1,400 ha). The park officially opened on March 31, 1990 as Aliso and Wood Canyons Regional Park; it was later designated a Wilderness Park to better preserve native habitat. Continued land acquisitions and donations since then brought the park to its current size.

== Historic sites of the Rancho ==
- Juan Avila Adobe.

== See also ==
- Ranchos of Orange County, California
- List of Ranchos of California
