= Sheep Hills, California =

Mountain range in Orange Country, California, United States

Sheep Hills
- Lisk Hills. Named after the builder of the first bmx jump.
- Location within California

Highest point
- Elevation: 205 m (673 ft)

Geography
- Country: United States
- State: California
- District: Orange County
- Range coordinates: 33°33′11.091″N 117°44′11.193″W
- Topo map: USGS San Juan Capistrano

The Sheep Hills are a mountain range in Orange County, California.

== See also ==
- Category: Hills of California
- Category: Peninsular Ranges
- Category: Geography of Orange County, California
