= Laguna Hills, California =

City in California, United States

- City
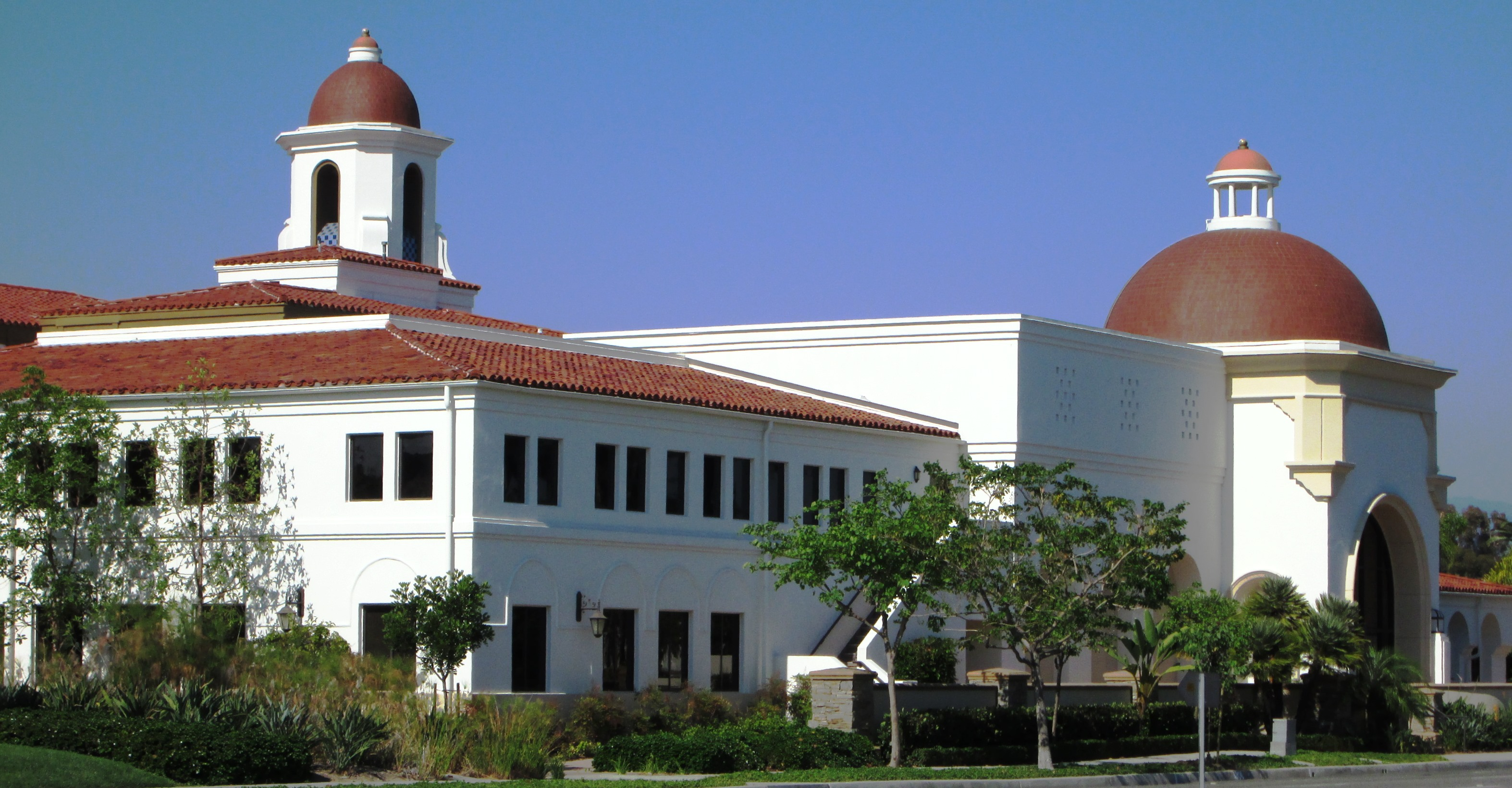
- Laguna Hills Civic Center from west

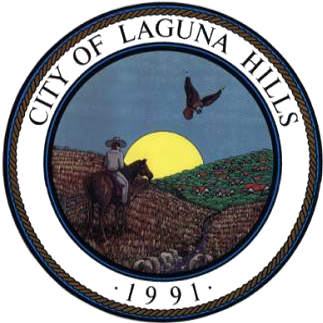
- Seal
- Interactive map of Laguna Hills, California
- Location in the United States
- Coordinates: 33°35′59″N 117°41′58″W
- Country: United States
- State: California
- County: Orange
- Incorporated: December 20, 1991

Government
  - Type: Council-Manager
  - Mayor: Dave Wheeler
  - Mayor Pro Tem: Janine Heft
  - City Council: Don Caskey; Erica Pezold; Don Sedgwick
  - City Manager: Jarad Hildenbrand

Area
  - Total: 6.57 sq mi (17.02 km^{2})
  - Land: 6.55 sq mi (16.96 km^{2})
  - Water: 0.023 sq mi (0.06 km^{2}) 0.37%
- Elevation: 364 ft (111 m)

Population (2020)
  - Total: 31,374
  - Density: 4,791/sq mi (1,850/km^{2})
- Time zone: UTC−8 (Pacific)
  - Summer (DST): UTC−7 (PDT)
- ZIP Codes: 92637, 92653–92654, 92656
- Area code: 949
- FIPS code: 06-39220
- GNIS feature ID: 1667917
- Website: www.lagunahillsca.gov

Laguna Hills (/ləˈɡuːnə/ luh-GOO-nuh; laguna being Spanish for 'lagoon') is a city in southern Orange County, California, United States. Its name refers to its proximity to Laguna Canyon and the much older Laguna Beach. Other newer cities nearby—Laguna Niguel and Laguna Woods—are similarly named. The population was 31,374 at the 2020 census.

== Geography ==
According to the United States Census Bureau, the city has a total area of 6.7 square miles (17 km^{2}), of which 6.7 square miles (17 km^{2}) is land and 0.025 square miles (0.065 km^{2}) (0.37%) is water.

== History ==
Laguna Hills is built on one of the major land grants developed during the rancho era. Following Mexico's independence from Spain in 1821, those who had served in the government or who had friends in authority, were given vast lands for cattle grazing. Rancho Lomas de Santiago, Rancho San Joaquin, and Rancho Niguel covered much of the western portion of the Saddleback Valley. Don Juan Avila was granted the 13,000-acre Rancho Niguel on which Laguna Hills is located.

In 1894, Lewis Moulton purchased Rancho Niguel from Don Juan Avila and increased the original grant to 22,000 acres (89 km^{2}). Moulton and his partner, Jean Piedra Daguerre, used the ranch to raise sheep and cattle. The Moulton Ranch was eventually subdivided in the early 1960s, and part of the division became today's Laguna Hills.

Incorporation efforts began in 1987 and on March 5, 1991, 86% of the residents voted in favor of forming the City of Laguna Hills. On December 20, 1991, Laguna Hills officially became a City. Subsequent annexations have included the North Laguna Hills (1996) and the "Westside Annexation" (2000) areas. The latter included 149 acres (0.60 km^{2}) of residential land, including the Aliso Viejo Community Association's Sheep Hills Park.

In 2004, Laguna Hills' City Hall was moved to an existing office building at 24035 El Toro Road, which was bought and renovated by the city. The city also rents out commercial space in the building, providing the city with a positive net income.

=== Transportation ===
==== Roads ====
Interstate 5 travels along the eastern border of Laguna Hills, forming the border with Lake Forest and Mission Viejo. I-5 has five interchanges in the city, from south to north: Oso Parkway, La Paz Road, Alicia Parkway, El Toro Road (Highway S18), and Lake Forest Drive.

County Route S18, also known as El Toro Road, is a major road in Laguna Hills, encompassing the border of Laguna Hills at the 5 Freeway, up to the 73 Toll Road.

In addition to the highways listed above, Alicia Parkway and Oso Parkway (which turns into Pacific Park Drive at the Laguna Hills-Aliso Viejo border) are major north-south thoroughfares and Moulton Parkway is a major east-west thoroughfare.

== Demographics ==
Historical population
Census	Pop.	Note	%±
1970	13,676		—
1980	33,600		145.7%
1990	46,731		39.1%
2000	31,178		−33.3%
2010	30,344		−2.7%
2020	31,374		3.4%
U.S. Decennial Census; 1860–1870 1880-1890; 1900 1910 1920; 1930 1940 1950; 1960 1970 1980; 1990 2000 2010; 2020

Laguna Hills first appeared as an unincorporated community in the 1970 U.S. census; and as a census designated place in the 1980 United States census. After incorporation, it was listed as a city in the 2000 U.S. census.

=== Racial and ethnic composition ===
Laguna Hills city, California – Racial and ethnic composition Note: the US Census treats Hispanic/Latino as an ethnic category. This table excludes Latinos from the racial categories and assigns them to a separate category. Hispanics/Latinos may be of any race.
Race / Ethnicity (NH = Non-Hispanic)	Pop 1980	Pop 1990	Pop 2000	Pop 2010	Pop 2020	% 1980	% 1990	% 2000	% 2010	% 2020
White alone (NH)	31,692	40,606	21,471	18,725	16,849	94.32%	86.89%	68.87%	61.71%	53.70%
Black or African American alone (NH)	206	419	404	373	420	0.61%	0.90%	1.30%	1.23%	1.34%
Native American or Alaska Native alone (NH)	145	111	77	53	32	0.43%	0.24%	0.25%	0.17%	0.10%
Asian alone (NH)	637	2,876	3,153	3,790	4,715	1.90%	6.15%	10.11%	12.49%	15.03%
Native Hawaiian or Pacific Islander alone (NH)	637	2,876	45	45	41	1.90%	6.15%	0.14%	0.15%	0.13%
Other race alone (NH)	32	18	73	65	173	0.10%	0.04%	0.23%	0.21%	0.55%
Mixed race or Multiracial (NH)	x	x	842	1,051	1,655	x	x	2.70%	3.46%	5.28%
Hispanic or Latino (any race)	888	2,701	5,113	6,242	7,489	2.64%	5.78%	16.40%	20.57%	23.87%
Total	33,600	46,731	31,178	30,344	31,374	100.00%	100.00%	100.00%	100.00%	100.00%

=== 2020 census ===
As of the 2020 census, Laguna Hills had a population of 31,374 and a population density of 4,791.4 inhabitants per square mile (1,850.0/km^{2}). The median age was 43.3 years. The age distribution was 19.3% under the age of 18, 8.3% aged 18 to 24, 24.3% aged 25 to 44, 28.6% aged 45 to 64, and 19.5% who were 65 years of age or older. For every 100 females, there were 93.8 males, and for every 100 females age 18 and over, there were 91.2 males.

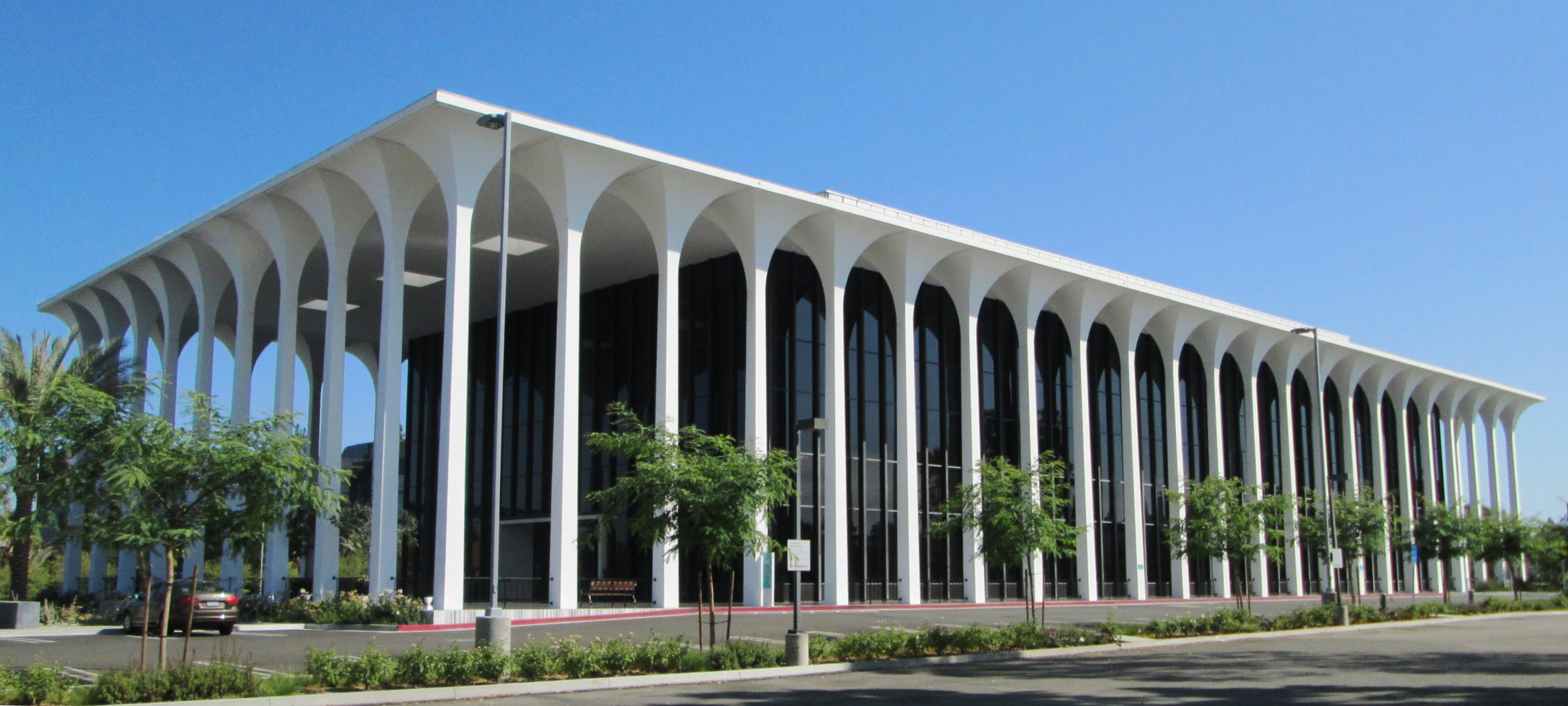
The Taj Mahal Medical Center has been a local landmark since 1964

The census reported that 98.8% of the population lived in households, 0.5% lived in non-institutionalized group quarters, and 0.7% were institutionalized. The city was 100.0% urban and 0.0% rural.

There were 11,023 households, of which 30.8% had children under the age of 18. Of all households, 57.8% were married-couple households, 5.5% were cohabiting couple households, 23.3% had a female householder with no spouse or partner present, and 13.4% had a male householder with no spouse or partner present. About 19.5% of households were made up of individuals, and 9.4% had someone living alone who was 65 years of age or older. The average household size was 2.81. There were 8,143 families (73.9% of all households).

There were 11,426 housing units at an average density of 1,745.0 units per square mile (673.7 units/km^{2}), of which 11,023 (96.5%) were occupied. Of these, 69.8% were owner-occupied, and 30.2% were occupied by renters. The homeowner vacancy rate was 0.7%, and the rental vacancy rate was 5.7%.

=== 2023 ACS estimates ===
In 2023, the US Census Bureau estimated that the median household income was $122,778, and the per capita income was $67,319. About 5.9% of families and 7.8% of the population were below the poverty line.

=== 2010 census ===
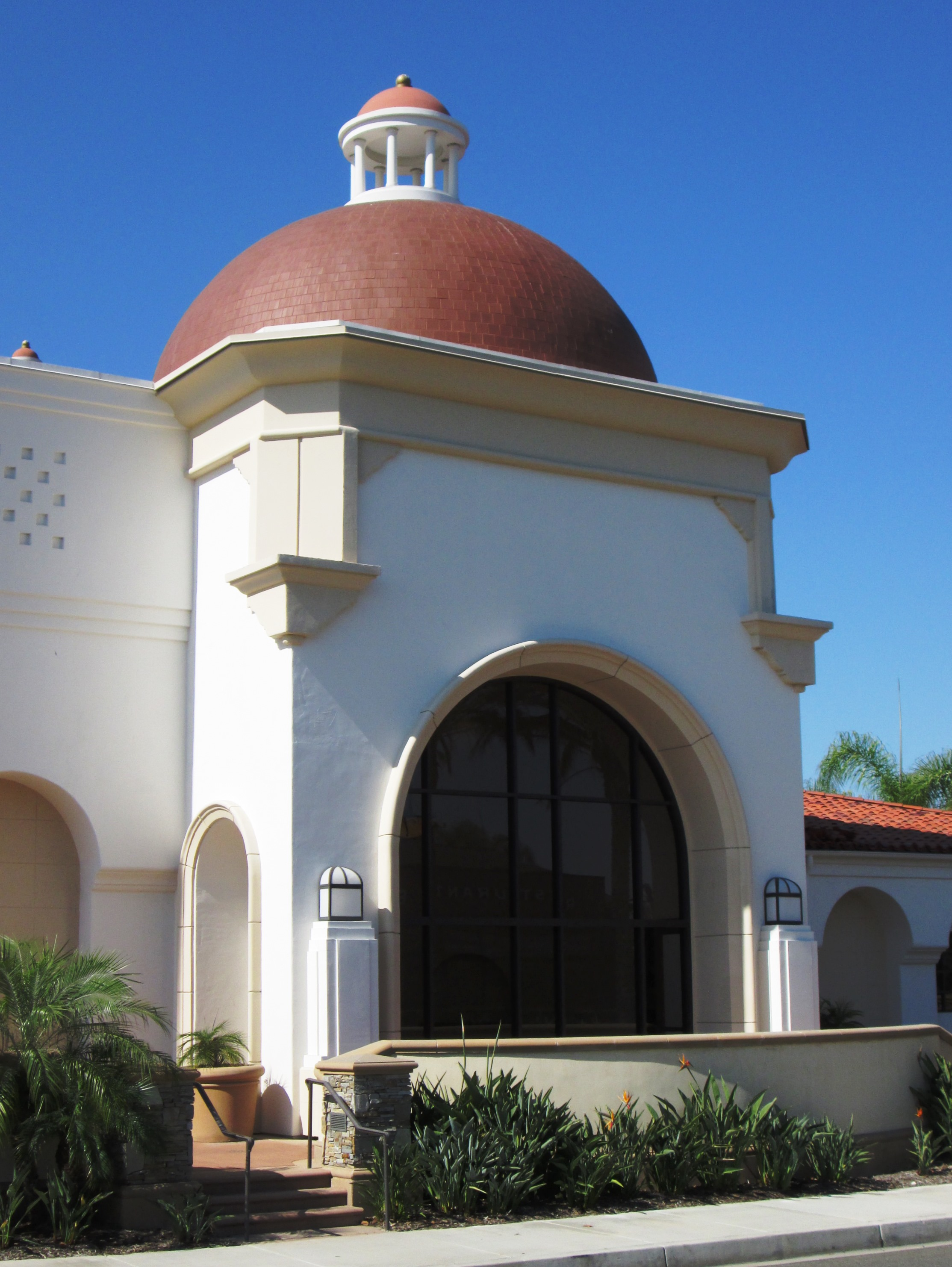
Part of the Laguna Hills Civic Center facade facing El Toro Road

The 2010 United States census reported that Laguna Hills had a population of 30,344. The population density was 4,532.4 inhabitants per square mile (1,750.0/km^{2}). The racial makeup of Laguna Hills was 22,045 (72.7%) White (61.7% Non-Hispanic White), 420 (1.4%) African American, 101 (0.3%) Native American, 3,829 (12.6%) Asian, 58 (0.2%) Pacific Islander, 2,470 (8.1%) from other races, and 1,421 (4.7%) from two or more races. Hispanic or Latino of any race were 6,242 persons (20.6%).

The Census reported that 29,975 people (98.8% of the population) lived in households, 233 (0.8%) lived in non-institutionalized group quarters, and 136 (0.4%) were institutionalized.

There were 10,469 households, of which 3,637 (34.7%) had children under the age of 18 living in them, 6,278 (60.0%) were opposite-sex married couples living together, 983 (9.4%) had a female householder with no husband present, 472 (4.5%) had a male householder with no wife present. There were 445 (4.3%) unmarried opposite-sex partnerships, and 101 (1.0%) same-sex married couples or partnerships. 2,041 households (19.5%) were made up of individuals, and 822 (7.9%) had someone living alone who was 65 years of age or older. The average household size was 2.86. There were 7,733 families (73.9% of all households); the average family size was 3.25.

6,762 people (22.3%) were under the age of 18; 2,617 people (8.6%) aged 18 to 24; 7,638 people (25.2%) aged 25 to 44; 9,437 people (31.1%) aged 45 to 64; and 3,890 people (12.8%) who were 65 years of age or older. The median age was 40.8 years. For every 100 females, there were 95.5 males. For every 100 females age 18 and over, there were 93.6 males.

There were 11,046 housing units at an average density of 1,649.9 per square mile (637.0/km^{2}), of which 7,820 (74.7%) were owner-occupied, and 2,649 (25.3%) were occupied by renters. The homeowner vacancy rate was 1.4%; the rental vacancy rate was 11.2%. 22,307 people (73.5% of the population) lived in owner-occupied housing units and 7,668 people (25.3%) lived in rental housing units.

== Government ==
Laguna Hills city vote by party in presidential elections
Year	Democratic	Republican	Third Parties
2024	48.23% 7,665	48.21% 7,662	3.56% 566
2020	51.98% 9,129	46.13% 8,102	1.90% 333
2016	45.95% 6,647	47.31% 6,844	6.75% 976
2012	40.67% 5,755	57.12% 8,083	2.21% 313
2008	44.69% 6,557	53.25% 7,812	2.06% 302
2004	36.12% 5,019	62.68% 8,711	1.20% 167
2000	35.90% 4,328	60.37% 7,278	3.73% 449
1996	33.87% 3,784	56.63% 6,326	9.50% 1,061
1992	26.69% 2,778	48.92% 5,091	24.39% 2,538

In the California State Legislature, Laguna Hills is in the 38th senatorial district, represented by Democrat Catherine Blakespear, and in the 72nd Assembly district, represented by Republican Diane Dixon.

In the United States House of Representatives, Laguna Hills is split between California's 40th congressional district, represented by Republican Young Kim, and California's 47th congressional district, represented by Democrat Dave Min.

Laguna Hills is historically a Republican stronghold in presidential elections. In 2020, however, Joe Biden became the first Democratic presidential nominee to win the city since its incorporation.

According to the California Secretary of State, as of February 10, 2019, Laguna Hills has 18,217 registered voters. Of those, 7,002 (38.44%) are registered Republicans, 5,261 (28.88%) are registered Democrats, and 5,143 (28.23%) have no political party preference/are independents.

The Laguna Hills Civic Center was an existing office building at 24035 El Toro Road – near the Laguna Hills Mall – which was bought and fully renovated by the city. The city moved its City Hall there in 2004, but also rents out space in the building on a commercial basis, providing the city with a positive net income on the building.

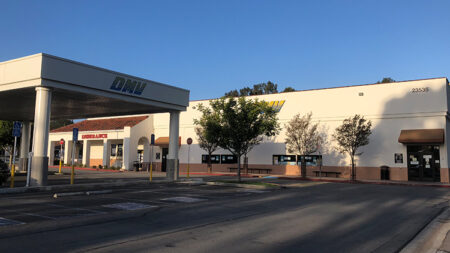
The DMV office in Laguna Hills

Laguna Hills is home to one of the California DMV field offices, where driving tests and other services are administered. The office serves much of south Orange County as the only other location in the region is in San Clemente.

=== Emergency services ===
Fire protection in Laguna Hills is provided by the Orange County Fire Authority with ambulance service by Care Ambulance Service. There is also the MemorialCare Saddleback Medical Center, a hospital equipped with a full emergency room. Law enforcement is provided by the Orange County Sheriff's Department.

== Economy ==
Centers of economic activity include:

- Laguna Hills Mall, closed in 2018, to be razed and redeveloped into the Five Lagunas mixed-use development
- El Toro Road at the I-5 freeway, an area busy with vehicular traffic and long-distance travel stops, thus being heavily populated with strip malls and fast-food restaurants.

== Education ==
Laguna Hills is served by the Saddleback Valley Unified School District. Laguna Hills students attend a variety of high performing elementary schools; Lomarena Elementary School, San Joaquin Elementary School and Valencia Elementary School. Laguna Hills middle schools are La Paz Intermediate School and Los Alisos Intermediate School in neighboring Mission Viejo. The city has its own high school, Laguna Hills High School, the smallest school in the district built in 1978 and one of the smallest in south Orange County with fewer than 1,700 students. LHHS has been named a National Blue Ribbon School and a California Distinguished School on multiple occasions.

== Notable people ==
- Shane Bieber, major league pitcher for the Cleveland Guardians, MVP of the 2019 Major League Baseball All-Star Game and 2020 American League Cy Young Award winner
- Aloe Blacc, singer and songwriter best known for his single I Need A Dollar
- Chad Carvin (1974), Olympic medalist swimmer
- Troy Cole, soccer player
- Phil Collen (current resident), guitarist for the band Def Leppard
- Russ Conway, actor
- Fieldy (current resident), bass guitarist for the band Korn
- Steve Gibson, computer programmer and co-host of Security Now
- Jenna Haze (1982), pornographic actress
- Mike Hopkins, Syracuse Orange men's basketball assistant coach and former player
- Jeff Keane, Family Circus cartoonist
- Tyler Krieger (1994), baseball player in the Cleveland Guardians organization
- John Lamb, major league pitcher for the Cincinnati Reds
- Michael Novales (1985), former US figure skating competitor, currently skating for Philippine Skating Union
- Carson Palmer (1998), NFL quarterback and Heisman Trophy winner for the University of Southern California
- Kaitlin Sandeno (1983), Olympic medalist swimmer
- George Sixta, cartoonist of the syndicated Rivets (1953–1985)
- Reece Ushijima (2003), Japanese-American racing driver
- Zacky Vengeance (current resident), rhythm guitarist for the band Avenged Sevenfold

== See also ==
- Laguna Hills Technology Branch Library
