= Laguna Niguel Regional Park =

Regional park in Laguna Niguel, California

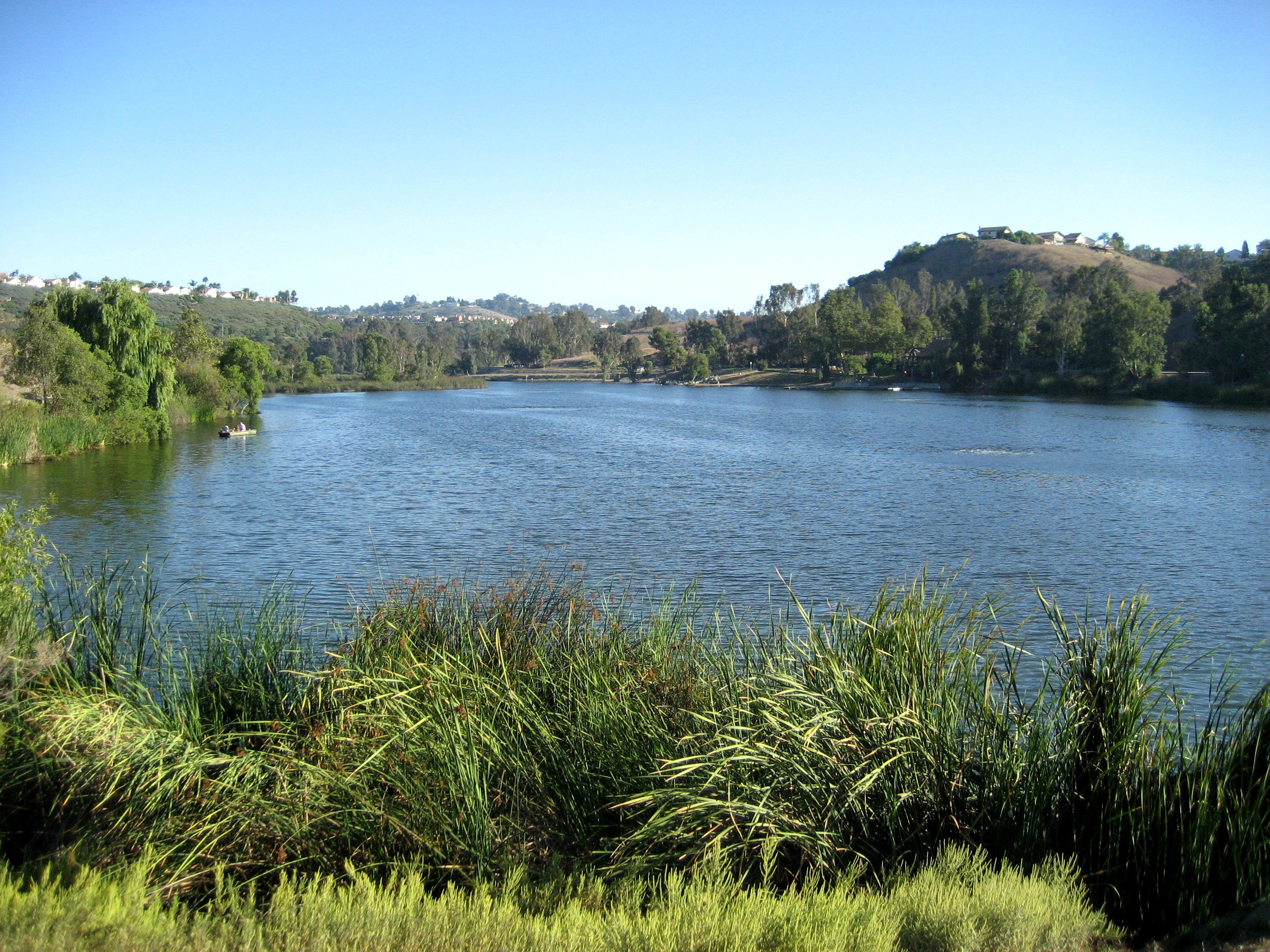
- Laguna Niguel Lake
- Interactive map of Laguna Niguel Regional Park
- Type: Regional (Orange County, California)
- Location: Laguna Niguel
- Coordinates: 33°32′50″N 117°42′25″W
- Area: 236 acres (96 ha)
- Created: 1973
- Visitors: 675,000 (in 2004)
- Status: Open

Laguna Niguel Regional Park is a public park in Laguna Niguel, in southern Orange County, California. Its main feature is Laguna Niguel Lake (also known as Sulphur Creek Reservoir), located within the park's boundaries.

Laguna Niguel's 4th of July fireworks show is held at the park every year.

== History ==
Laguna Niguel Regional Park in 1975.

The park was established for public use in 1973. Since then, it has had several developments. In 1976, a lake concession building and boat dock were constructed by the county. In 1981, local S&S Construction Company donated an additional 20 acres (8 ha) of land for county use. The donation included "Kite Hill". In June 1983, a gazebo was built on the top of the scenic turnaround overlooking the park. In October 1984, many new additions were constructed, including: new front park entrance sign, landscaping, planting California Sycamore trees, reforestation of approximately 2,000 trees throughout the entire park, bicycle trails, additional picnic shelters, two creek crossing pedestrian bridges, one restroom, five fishing access piers, one fish cleaning station, an amphitheater, two regulation sand volleyball courts, two regulation horseshoe pits, and a par course along the park's two-mile jogging trail.

== Recreational uses ==
The Sulphur Creek Reservoir, also known as Laguna Niguel Lake, is used for fishing and boating. The park has volleyball courts, horseshoe pits, tennis courts, bike trails, playgrounds, barbecue pits, and picnic shelters. It also has a hill known as "Kite Hill". Local high school cross country meets are occasionally held here. Also the Laguna Niguel Lightning youth baseball program for conditioning.
