= Tell =

Tell may refer to:

- Tell (archaeology), a type of archaeological site
- Tell (name), a name used as a given name and a surname
- Tell (poker), a subconscious behavior that can betray information to an observant opponent

== Arts, entertainment, and media ==
- Tell (2012 film), a short psychological horror film by Ryan Connolly
- Tell (2014 film), a crime thriller starring Katee Sackhoff, Jason Lee and Milo Ventimiglia
- Tell Magazine, a Nigerian newsweekly
- "The Tell", a 2012 episode of NCIS
- "The Tell" (Only Murders in the Building), a 2022 television episode
- "The Tell" (Teen Wolf), a 2011 television episode
- The Tell, a photomural, part of the Laguna Canyon Project

== Places ==
=== Middle East ===
- Tel Aviv, Israel
- Et-Tell, an archaeological site identified with Bethsaida
- Tell, West Bank, a Palestinian village near Nablus
- Ancient Tell, Beirut, Lebanon; the Canaanite pre-Phoenician era of Beirut and archaeological site

=== North Africa ===
- Tell Atlas, or the Tell, a mountain range extending across Morocco, Algeria, and Tunisia

=== United States ===
- Tell, Texas, unincorporated community in the United States
- Tell, Wisconsin, town in the United States
- Tell City, Indiana, township in the United States
- Tell Township, Emmons County, North Dakota, township in the United States
- Tell Township, Pennsylvania, township in the United States

== See also ==
- Don't ask, don't tell (disambiguation)
- Tall (disambiguation)
- TEL (disambiguation)
- Teller (disambiguation)
- Tells (disambiguation)
