= Telling (surname) =

Telling is a surname. Notable bearers of the name include:

- Arthur Henry Telling (1884–after 1949), British trade unionist
- Clemens Legolas Telling, a Danish rapper known as Clemens
- David Telling (1938–2003), British businessman
- Edward R. Telling (1919–2005), American businessman
- Elisabeth Telling (1882–1979), American artist

== See also ==
- Tell (name)
- Teller (surname)
