= Laguna Canyon =

Canyon in Orange County, California

Laguna Canyon Cañada de Las Lagunas
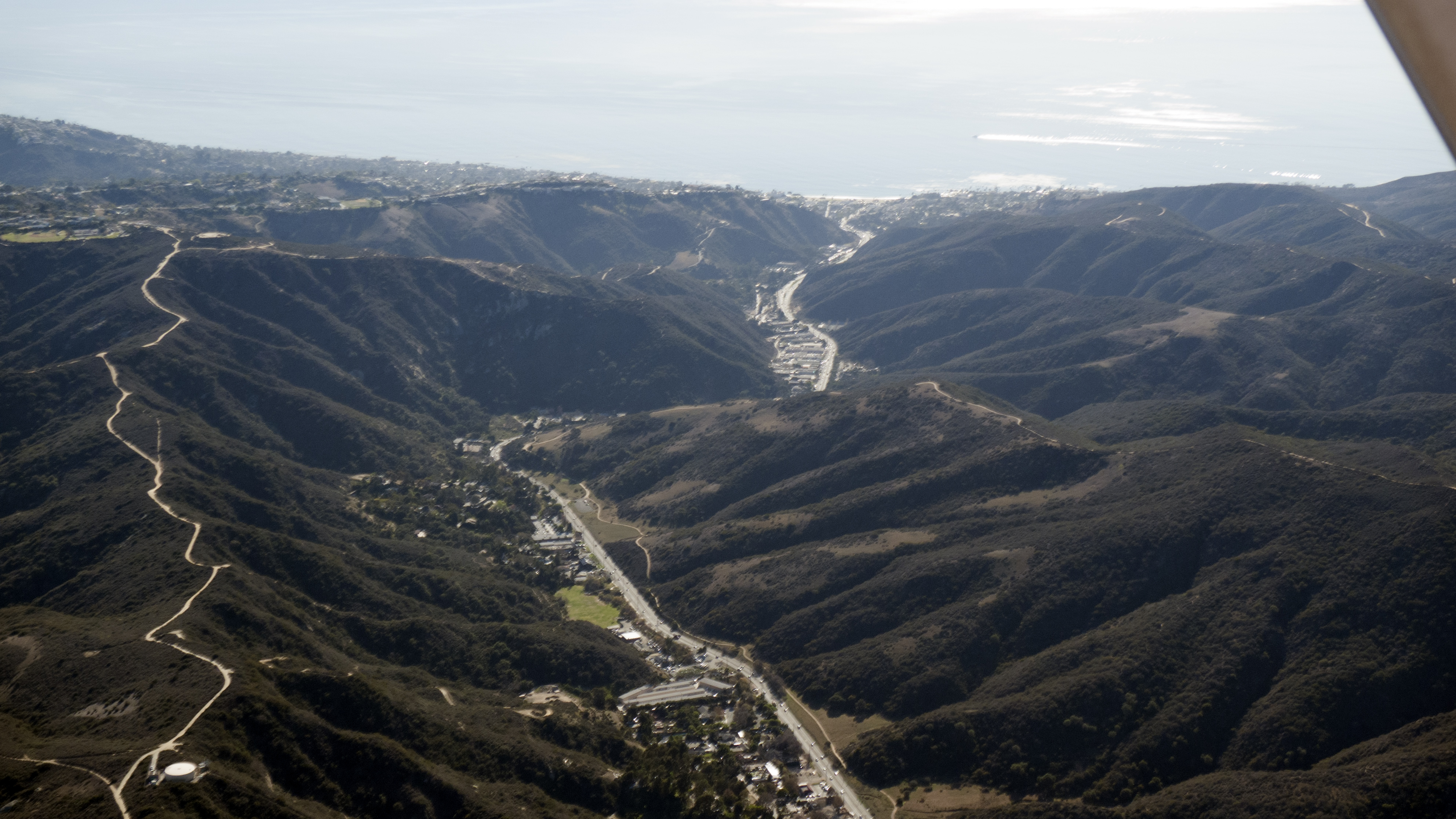
- Laguna Canyon

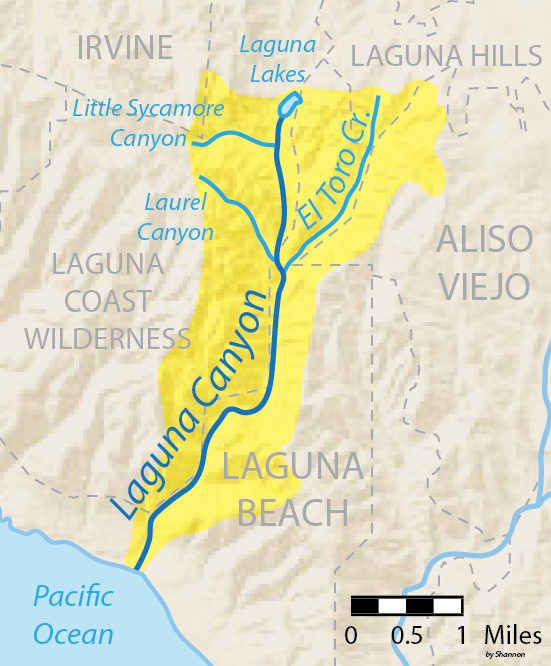
- Map of Laguna Canyon drainage area

Location
- Country: United States
- State: California
- Region: Orange County

Physical characteristics
- Source: San Joaquin Hills
  - coordinates: 33°37′22″N 117°45′20″W
  - elevation: 380 ft (120 m)
- Mouth: Laguna Beach
  - coordinates: 33°32′32″N 117°47′05″W
  - elevation: 0 ft (0 m)
- Length: 7 mi (11 km)
- Basin size: 10.5 sq mi (27 km^{2})
- Discharge
  - location: Pacific Ocean
  - average: 0 cu ft/s (0 m^{3}/s)
  - maximum: 2,000 cu ft/s (57 m^{3}/s)

Basin features
- Tributaries
  - left: El Toro Creek
  - right: Laurel Canyon Wash, Little Sycamore Canyon, Willow Canyon Wash

Laguna Canyon, also called Cañada de las Lagunas (Spanish for 'Canyon of the Lakes'), is a gorge that cuts through the San Joaquin Hills in southern Orange County, California, in the United States, directly south of the city of Irvine. The canyon runs from northeast to southwest, and is drained on the north side by tributaries of San Diego Creek and on the south by Laguna Canyon Creek. It is deeper and more rugged on the southwestern end near Laguna Beach.

Geologically, the canyon likely originated millions of years ago as the result of San Diego Creek cutting through the San Joaquin Hills. Uplift diverted that stream to its present course, leaving Laguna Canyon as a wind gap. California State Route 133 runs the entire length of the canyon connecting Laguna Beach and Irvine, while California State Route 73 crosses it, running southeast–northwest. A majority of the canyon is located within the Laguna Coast Wilderness Park; small portions are part of Aliso and Wood Canyons Wilderness Park and the cities of Irvine, Laguna Beach, Laguna Woods and Aliso Viejo.

== Geography and geology ==
Laguna Canyon is approximately 8 miles (13 km) long and 1 mile (1.6 km) wide at the widest points. The city of Irvine lies to the northeast, Lake Forest and Aliso Viejo to the east, the undeveloped San Joaquin Hills to the west, and Laguna Beach to the south. The drainage divide of the canyon near its northern end separates Laguna Canyon Creek from the San Diego Creek watershed.

State Route 133, locally called Laguna Canyon Road, winds through Laguna Canyon for the entire length of the gorge. California State Route 73 bisects the gorge east–west. The lower section of the canyon is part of the Laguna Coast Wilderness Park, while the upper section also has a few smaller wilderness preserves. The upper section contains Barbara's Lake which is Orange County's only natural lake formed by groundwater rising along a local fault line. This and two smaller intermittent ponds are the namesake of the canyon. A section of the lower canyon within the city limits of Laguna Beach is heavily developed. The northernmost extreme of the canyon lies near a residential area that adjoins Interstate 405.

The canyon was most likely formed by San Diego Creek cutting through the rising San Joaquin Hills over a span of about 1.22 million years. At some point, however, the creek changed course, and the water gap it had formed was walled off by the mountains and became a separate watershed. The gradient of the drainage divide separating Laguna Canyon and the San Diego Creek watershed is very small, allowing for the canyon's modern use as a transportation route.

=== The creek ===
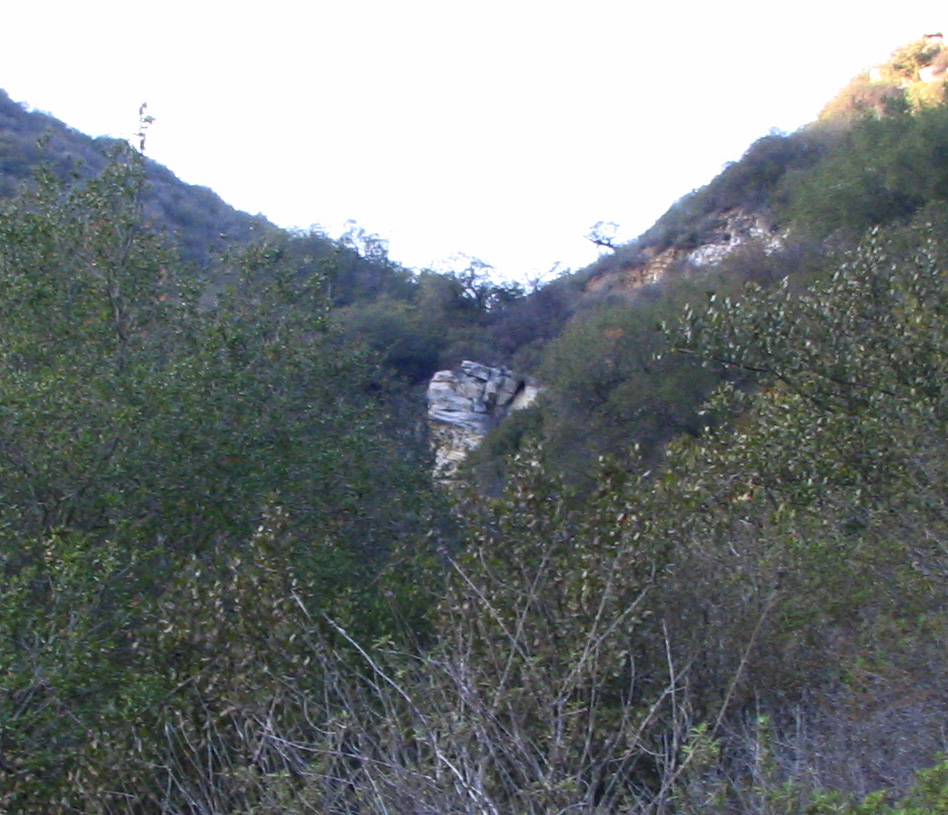
The rock ledge that Laurel Canyon Creek spills over during heavy rainfall, viewed from lower on the Laurel Canyon Trail.

Laguna Canyon Creek begins as an ephemeral creek draining a mountainside west of the valley floor down into the canyon. It is briefly culverted where it crosses under Laguna Canyon Road, but most of the upper course flows in a natural channel. It soon passes the Laguna Lakes and receives Little Sycamore Canyon from the right; this creek drains a narrow side canyon which runs about 2 miles (3.2 km) eastward. The creek continues southward, and then passes beneath Laguna Canyon Rd. again and receives Camarillo Canyon, a short and steep tributary, from the right.

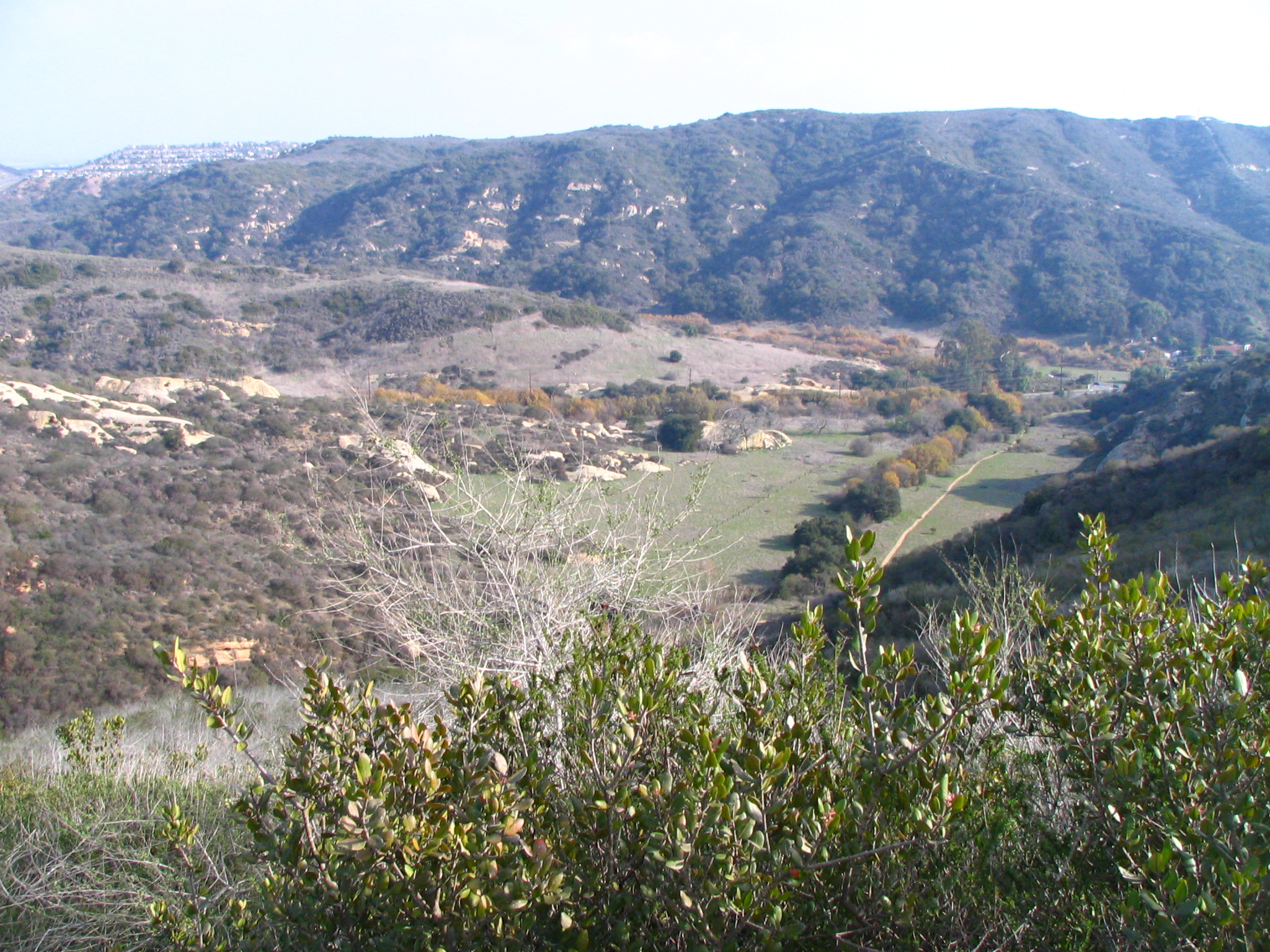
The flat lower reach of Camarillo Canyon, with the City of Lake Forest in the upper left. Laguna Canyon cuts across the image in the middle right.

The stream then runs south under the twin California State Route 73 bridges and enters an underground culvert beneath an onramp. While in this culvert, Laurel Canyon (which harbors a 100-foot (30 m) waterfall) and larger Willow Canyon join from the right, then about 0.5 miles (0.80 km) later, the creek re-emerges from underground and flows in a riprap lined channel for the next few miles. It receives its major tributary, El Toro Creek, from the left. El Toro Creek, which follows El Toro Road for much of its length, drains parts of Laguna Hills and Aliso Viejo before emptying into Laguna Canyon Creek.

The creek turns sharply west and then back south, then shortly after, is forced into a concrete-lined box culvert that carries it through downtown Laguna Beach (This stretch is also known as Broadway Creek.) It then is diverted completely underground and its channel winds to an outfall at Main Beach, one of the most popular beaches in Laguna Beach.

=== Modifications ===
Laguna Canyon and its side tributaries have received some flood control modifications. These include debris basins at the mouth of nearly every major tributary, stretches of lined or unlined flood control channels, and other structures. The debris basins, sometimes called retention basins, are circular depressions constructed by the Orange County Flood Control Division to slow down flash floods. The upper Laguna Canyon area has a few flood control channels and the lower creek is encased entirely in one; this begins as a riprap channel with an unlined bottom, which transitions to a concrete culvert. These improvements help to protect infrastructure in the canyon from storm and landslide damage.

There is little development within the main canyon, although the El Toro Creek area is primarily residential. There is also some residential and commercial development downstream of State Route 73. The concrete channel in this area is small and undersized for major floods, which caused it to overflow in the late 1990s and again in 2010.

== Wildlife ==
=== Animals ===
The Laguna Canyon area supports a variety of native Southern California wildlife, including large mammals such as mountain lions, bobcats, coyotes and mule deer. Like Aliso and Wood Canyons Regional Park to the south, the canyon supports over one hundred species of birds. Some of its endangered species include California gnatcatcher, cactus wren, and orange-throated whiptail. Except for the Laguna Lakes, the canyon has no fish habitat, and riparian habitat is sparse because the local creeks have only seasonal flow.

=== Plants ===
The dominant vegetation cover of coastal sage scrub typically goes through approximately 25-year cycles, with its peak biodiversity reached in roughly 10 years after the beginning of a new 25-year period. Such periods are typically separated by wildfires, which clear away dead or dying vegetation and leave bare ground for new growth. The canyon is one of the last remaining sanctuaries for many plants native to Southern California. Approximately one hundred species of plants, most native to California, are found in Laurel and Willow Canyons alone. These include monkey flower, goldenrod, and sagebrush.

== Recreation ==
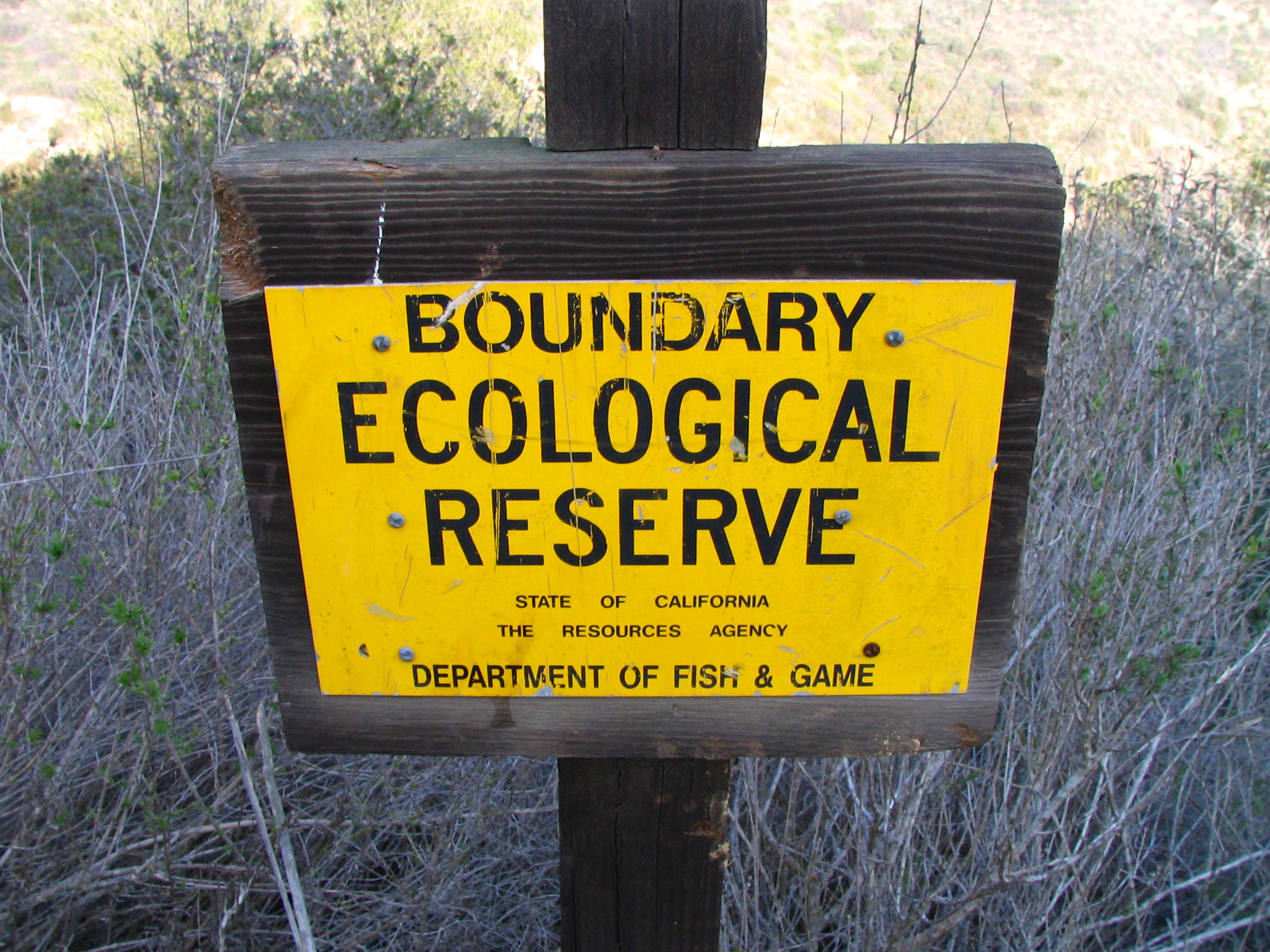
Sign denoting the boundary of Laguna Coast Wilderness, on the center reach of Willow Canyon Trail

Laguna Canyon forms the center section of an approximately 17,500-acre (71 km^{2}) strip of wilderness preserve running northeast–southwest along the Pacific coast. Most of the canyon is covered Laguna Coast Wilderness Park, which is 7,000 acres (28 km^{2}). It is bordered on the south by Aliso and Wood Canyons Regional Park, and on its north by Crystal Cove State Park. The parks are managed by the County of Orange and the California Department of Fish and Game, while portions of Laguna Coast are also owned by the City of Laguna Beach. Although there is no trail that follows the main canyon (as it is traversed by State Route 133), there are many trails, mostly hiking, that lead up narrow side canyons, as well as a trail that circumnavigates Laguna Lakes. Several connecting trails run east-south towards Aliso and Wood Canyons, providing access between the two watersheds.

== History ==
Lying to the north of Aliso Canyon, the Laguna Canyon area lay within the tribal boundary of the Tongva, a Native American group whose territory expanded from north-central Orange County well past the San Gabriel River and into the Los Angeles Basin. Aliso Creek, whose watershed borders Laguna Canyon to the east, formed the tribal boundary between the Tongva and Acjachemen.

Laguna Canyon Creek was a seasonal stream but the Laguna Lakes, formed by springs arising from a minor fault zone, stayed year round. A Native American path ran through the canyon to the present-day Laguna Beach area, where they fished and collected abalone and limpets. The Tongva lived in villages of 50-100 people, in huts made of brushes and tules on a wooden framework. When Spanish explorers arrived in the mid-18th century, they named the canyon "Cañada de las Lagunas", referring to the Laguna Lakes. A land grant called La Bolsa de San Joaquín occupied the canyon area up to the 19th century. By 1905, Laguna Beach began to draw municipal water from springs in Laguna Canyon.

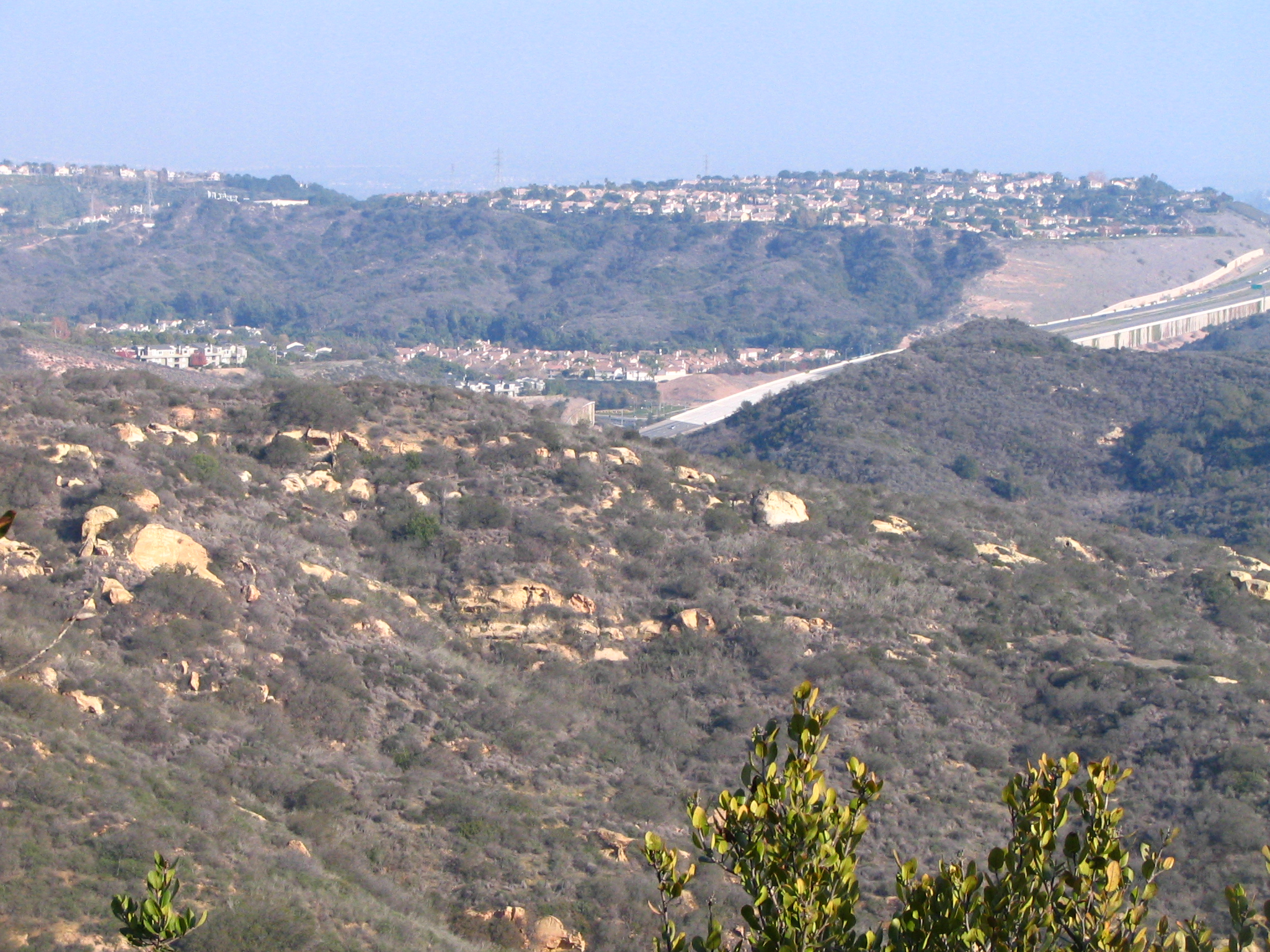
California State Route 73 crossing Laguna Canyon, built despite protests in the 1990s.

Before Laguna Canyon became a wilderness park, a housing development was proposed to be built in and around the canyon, tentatively called "Laguna Laurel". The 2,150-acre (8.7 km^{2}) community, which was proposed to contain 3,200 housing units as well as a number of businesses, was canceled in the 1990s after the City of Laguna Beach purchased four of its parcels in order to provide space for a wilderness park, while the City of Irvine purchased one, and Laguna Coast Wilderness Park was opened and dedicated in 1993. Occasionally, the park system (which adjoins Aliso/Wood Canyons Regional Park) is augmented by donations of vacant land.

The proposal to stop the development was supported by a crowd of eight to eleven thousand on November 11, 1989. This large group gathered in downtown Laguna Beach and marched out to the photographic mural "The Tell", created by the Laguna Canyon Project, in the Sycamore Hills area of Laguna Canyon. This protest was called the "Walk to Save Laguna Canyon". Several years later, two to three thousand gathered to protest the construction of California State Route 73 (which would cross the canyon), but the highway was built eventually.

In 1993, a massive wildfire burned over 16,000 acres (65 km^{2}) in Laguna Canyon and Laguna Beach, and ranked behind the 1948 Santa Ana Canyon fire as one of the worst fires in Orange County history. The fire was in part caused by strong Santa Ana Winds, which caused flames that rose up to 200 feet (61 m) high.

== Future ==
The canyon is one of the last remaining wild areas in Orange County in a strip of preserves along the San Joaquin Hills about 20 miles (32 km) long and 8 miles (13 km) wide. Recently, State Route 133 between the 405 and 73 freeways has been expanded to four lanes from the original two lanes, and much of the original road down the center of the canyon has been demolished and re-vegetated. The new road was constructed further from the creek bed to lessen environmental impacts. The northernmost extreme of the canyon is being developed into a residential area consisting of 590 homes, called Laguna Crossing, the first phase of which was opened in 2013.

Other parts of Laguna Canyon have been impacted by development. The last 3 miles (4.8 km) of the canyon, closest to downtown Laguna Beach, are urbanized, containing the Laguna College of Art and Design, the Sawdust Art Festival venues and other establishments. Most of the remaining wild areas are now found in the side canyons. Urban runoff has resulted in bacterial pollution downstream at Main Beach in Laguna Beach. Several organizations are now dedicated to preserving the remaining wild areas of the canyon, including the Laguna Canyon Foundation.

== See also ==
- Biology of Aliso and Wood Canyons Regional Park
- Wildlife of Aliso Creek
- Mark Chamberlain (photographer)
