= Telle (surname) =

Telle is a surname and may refer to:

- Adam Telle (born 1981/2), American government official
- Emely Telle (born 1997), German Paralympic swimmer
- Hannah Telle (born 1987), American actress
- Serge Telle (born 1955), French diplomat

== See also ==
- Tell (name)
- Teller (surname)
- Telli (surname)
