= Insaana =

- Official film poster
- Directed by: Ali Seezan
- Written by: Ina Ali
- Screenplay by: Amir Saleem
- Produced by: Ali Seezan; Ahmed Shizan
- Starring: Ali Seezan; Aishath Rishmy; Fathimath Fareela
- Cinematography: Shivaz Abdulla
- Edited by: Aminath Shanaaz
- Music by: Mohamed Ikram
- Production company: C-Xanal Movies
- Release date: September 21, 2014
- Running time: 61 minutes
- Country: Maldives
- Language: Dhivehi

Insaana is a 2014 Maldivian psychological thriller film directed by Ali Seezan. Produced by Ahmed Shizan and Ali Seezan under C-Xanal Movies, the film stars Ali Seezan, Aishath Rishmy and Fathimath Fareela in pivotal roles. The film was released on 21 September 2014.

The film was inspired by Ryan Connolly's short psychological horror film Tell (2012) which is loosely based on the Edgar Allan Poe short story "The Tell-Tale Heart". The film revolved around a murder and how the murderer tries to evade from the crime. At the 2015 South Asian Association for Regional Cooperation Film Festival, Insaana was bestowed with Bronze Medal as Best Film, competing with seventeen regional films.

== Plot ==
Zabeer (Ali Seezan) is a short tempered man married to Hana (Aishath Rishmy). One day he was scolded by his work manager when he continuously shows to work late and is found to be irresponsible. Annoyed he goes to his mistress, Azu (Nadhiya Hassan) and spend sometimes with her in her room. Later that night, he goes to his house and argues with his wife when asked about his whereabouts. The argument heats up, Zabeer takes a steel and murders her. He then takes her on his shoulder and hides her before calling Azu and informing her of the crime. Referencing an earlier conversation in which Azu had suggested murdering Hana, Zabeer tries to convince her to help cover up the crime. Azu declines, leaving Zubair to deal with the consequences alone.

He begins to clean the blood from the kitchen floor, and hears something moving nearby. Whilst investigating, he finds blood dripping from the place she was kept, and goes up to investigate, where he finds the body as he left it. As he moves backward, he slips on the blood, and is knocked unconscious. On regaining consciousness, Zabeer finds blood on back of his head, and while rinsing it he sees a hallucination of Hana looking at him. Ina (Fathimath Fareela), Hana's friend, arrives, and finds that Hana is missing. Zabeer tells her that she had walked outside, and left her phone. Fearing that she knows of the murder, he arms himself with a kitchen knife, but she leaves before he attacks her.

Zabeer closes Hana's eyes, and prepares to cut her arm off. However, he is interrupted at the last moment by hearing a sound nearby. He looks back to find Hana's eyes now open again. He throws the knife, hits the light switch, and falls to ground. When their friend Ibbe (Ahmed Saeed) knocks on the door and enter house, Zabeer tries to ease things up. When he tries to search the house Zabeer stabs him on the chest with a scissor. The two struggle silently, with Zabeer pushing the scissor further inside. He is distracted by an apparition of Hana standing at the door, giving Ibbe time to pull the scissor out and stabbing Zabeer. The two separate, and fall against opposite sides of the room, where they sit against the walls, dying.

== Cast ==
- Ali Seezan as Zabeer
- Aishath Rishmy as Hana
- Fathimath Fareela as Inaa
- Ahmed Saeed as Ibbe
- Nadhiya Hassan as Azu
- Mohamed Rishwan as Ahmed
- Yooshau Jameel as Hassan

== Development ==
The film was announced on 16 August 2014. Filming took place in B. Eydhafushi and K. Thulusdhoo. Story of the film was written by Ina Ali based on an English novel which was later adapted for a screenplay by Amir Saleem. On 21 August 2014, reports surfaced that the storyline is heavily inspired by Edgar Allan Poe's short story "The Tell-Tale Heart" and Ryan Connolly's short psychological horror film Tell (2012).

== Soundtrack ==
Track listing
No.	Title	Lyrics	Music	Singer(s)	Length
1.	"Insaana" (Promotional song)	Mohamed Abdul Ghanee	Ibrahim Zaid Ali	Ibrahim Zaid Ali

== Release and reception ==
The film was released on 21 September 2014. Total four shows were screened at Olympus Cinema on a span of two days; 21 September and 22 September 2014. Upon release, the film received widespread critical acclaim. Hassan Naail from Vaguthu called it "one of the best Maldivian release till date" and praises each department of the film. "None of the shots gave the room for dissatisfaction. Ali Seezan as an actor and director has given his career best performance while Aishath Rishmy as the assistant director and as the lead actress has given her best for the movie".

== Accolades ==
Award	Category	Recipients	Result	Ref.
SAARC Film Festival	Best Film	Insaana (Bronze Medal)	Won	
8th Gaumee Film Awards	Best Background Music	Mohamed Ikram	Nominated	
8th Gaumee Film Awards	Best Sound Editing	Ali Seezan, Ibrahim Wisan	Nominated	
