= Don't Ask (disambiguation) =

Don't Ask is an album by Tina Arena.

Don't Ask may also refer to:

- Don't Ask (Sonny Rollins album)
- "Don't Ask" (Blood Red Shoes song)
- "Don't Ask" (Poppy song)
- Don't ask (immigration policy)

== See also ==
- Don't Ask, Don't Tell (disambiguation)
