= LCAD =

LCAD may refer to:

- Laguna College of Art and Design, Laguna Beach, California, USA
- Leeds College of Art, Leeds, England, formerly Leeds College of Art and Design
- Loughborough College of Art and Design, now merged into Loughborough University
