= Barbara's Lake =

Lake in the state of California, United States

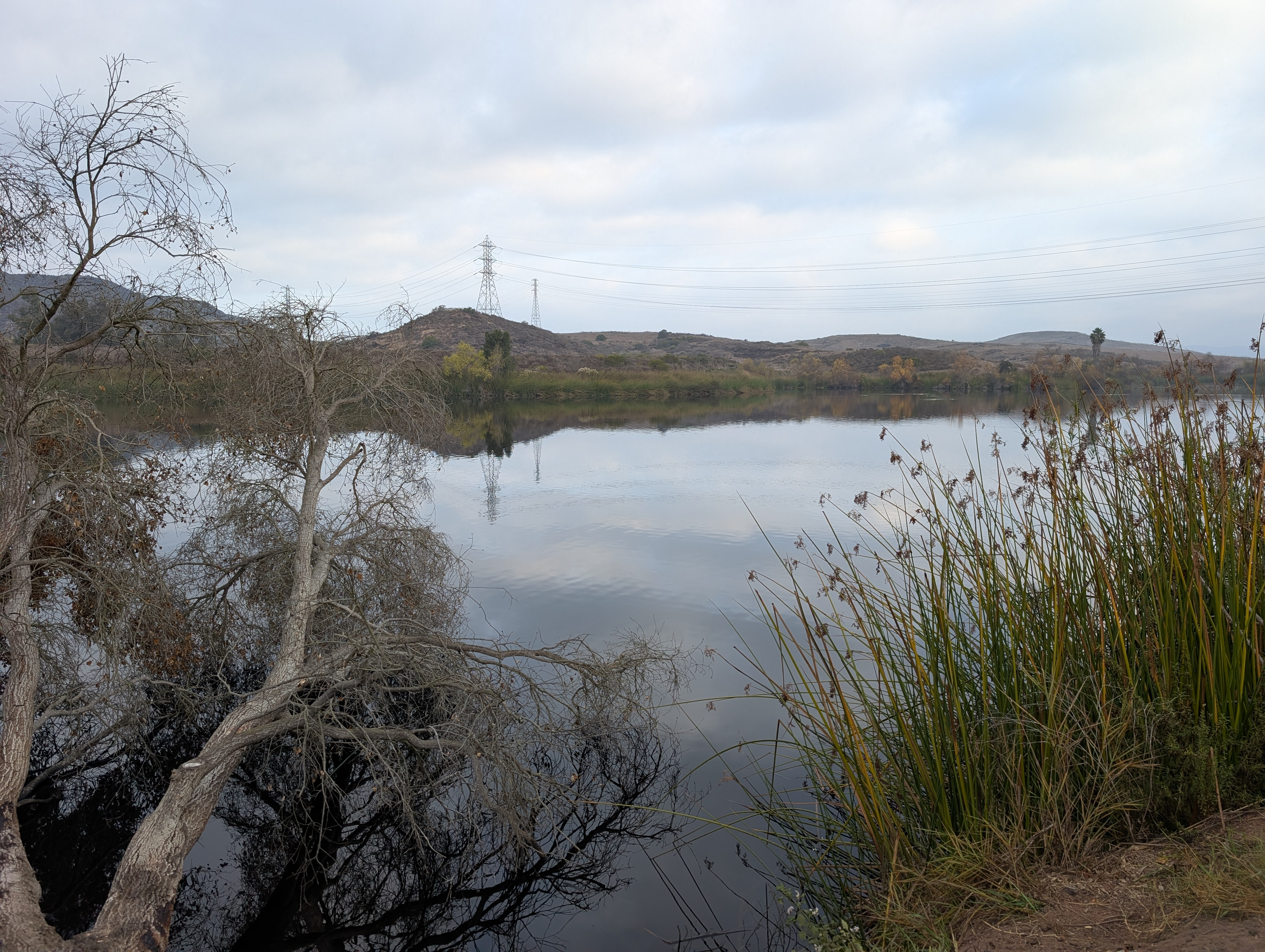
- Barbara's Lake, Laguna Coast Wilderness Park

- Location within California Location within the United States
- Location: Orange County, California
- Coordinates: 33°36′35″N 117°45′26″W
- Basin countries: United States
- Surface area: 12 acres (4.9 ha)
- Surface elevation: 361 feet (110 m)

Barbara's Lake is a natural lake in the James Dilley Greenbelt Preserve section of the greater Laguna Coast Wilderness Park in Laguna Canyon, Orange County, California, United States.

The lake is believed to be spring fed and bears the distinction of being the only natural lake in Orange County, California that contains water year round. This lake is named in recognition of local conservationist Barbara Rabinowitsh who worked to keep the area from being developed.

Recreation opportunities include hiking and bird watching but no use of watercraft, fishing, or swimming is allowed in Barbara's Lake.
