= Tall =

Tall commonly refers to:

- Tall, a degree of height
  - Tall, a degree of human height

Tall may also refer to:

== Places ==
- Tall, Semnan, a village in Semnan Province of Iran
- River Tall, a river in Northern Ireland, United Kingdom

== Arts. entertainment, and media ==
- Tall: The American Skyscraper and Louis Sullivan, a 2006 documentary film
- Mr. Tall, a fictional character in the Mr. Men series

== Other uses ==
- Tall (surname), a surname
- Tall tale, a lie or fictitious story
- Tell (archaeology), or tall, a type of archaeological site

== See also ==
- List of people known as the Tall
- TAL (disambiguation)
- Tell (disambiguation)
