= Tellis =

Tellis is a surname. Notable people with the name include:

- Ashley J. Tellis (born 1961), American national defense strategist
- Gerard Tellis, American business studies academic
- Winston Tellis, American business studies academic

== See also ==
- Tellis Frank (born 1965), American basketball player
- Tellis of Sicyon, Ancient Greek athlete
- Telli (surname)
