= Teli (surname) =

Teli is a surname, and may refer to:

- Admir Teli (born 1981), Albanian footballer
- Gauri Narayan Sah Teli (born 1945), Nepalese politician
- Rameswar Teli (born 1970), Indian politician
- Siraj Kassam Teli (1953–2020), Pakistani businessman

== See also ==
- Telli (surname)
