= Tells =

Tells may refer to:

- Tells (band), a British experimental band formed in 2005
- Tells Peak, a mountain in California

== See also ==
- Tell (disambiguation)
