= Leopold Teller =

Hungarian actor

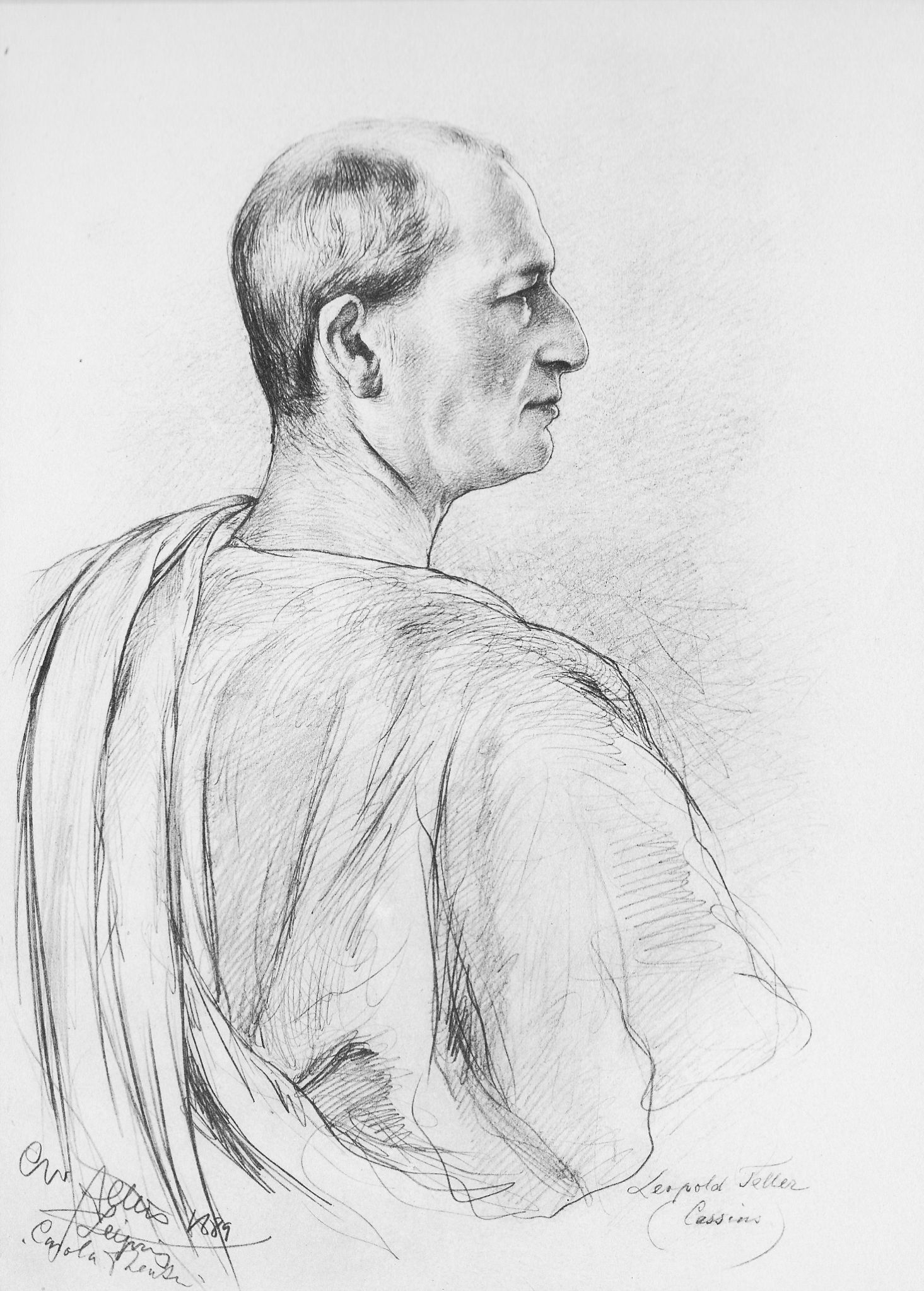
Leopold Teller at Carola theatre, Leipzig

Leopold Teller (April 3, 1844 – 1908) was a Hungarian actor.

He was born in Budapest. For a time he studied medicine at the University of Vienna, but in 1862 he went to Ljubljana, where he joined a theatrical company. During the following ten years he played at small theaters in Jihlava, Klagenfurt, Opava, Budapest, Leipzig, and Liebenstein; from 1874 to 1890 he was a member of the "Meininger", and appeared in such roles as Shylock, Iago, Gessler, Franz Moor, and Marinelli. On leaving the "Meininger" he secured an engagement at the Stadttheater in Hamburg, where his principal roles were Graf Trast, Doctor Crusius, and Graf Menges. In 1899 he retired from the stage, and settled as teacher of elocution in Hamburg. He wrote a play entitled "Wintersonnenwende", which had considerable success.

== See also ==
- Teller (surname)
