= Tell (name) =

Tell is both a first name and a surname. Notable people with the name include:

== Given name ==
- Tell Berna (1891–1975), American long-distance runner and Olympic gold medalist
- Tell Taylor (1876–1937), American songwriter

== Surname ==
- Alma Tell (1898–1937), American actress
- Christian Tell (1808–1884), Wallachian and Romanian politician
- Christine Tell, Canadian politician
- David Tell, American conservative political journalist
- Franziska Tell (born 1995), German politician
- Marvell Tell (born 1996), American football player
- Olive Tell (1894–1951), American actress
- William Tell, legendary Swiss hero
- William Tell (musician) (born 1980), American rock musician
- Zak Tell (born 1970), Swedish musician and lead singer

== See also ==
- Tell (disambiguation)
- Jeroen Tel, computer game musician
- Teller (disambiguation)
