= Telli (surname) =

Telli is a surname, and may refer to:

- Ahmet Telli (1946–2026), Turkish poet
- Diallo Telli (1925–1977), Guinean diplomat and politician
- Seraina Telli (born 1990), Swiss singer and songwriter

== See also ==
- Tellis
- Teli (surname)
- Telle (surname)
