= Winston Tellis =

American business studies academic

Winston Tellis is the Stephen and Camille Schramm Professor of Information Systems and Operations Management at The Charles F. Dolan School of Business at Fairfield University in Fairfield, Connecticut. He was a recipient of a Fairfield University Distinguished Faculty/Administrator Award in 2000.

Tellis co-founded the Center for Microfinance Advice and Consulting in 2001. The Center works to help develop self-sustaining business operations in developing countries. He and Dr. Michael Tucker have helped develop self-sustaining businesses in poor rural areas of Haiti and Nicaragua. Tellis was honored for his work for Haiti's poor by FONKOZE USA, which supports Fonkoze, Haiti's only alternative bank for the poor. Fonkoze USA is one of only five non-profit organizations approved by the U.S. Securities and Exchange Commission to solicit U.S. investments for foreign organizations.
