= Ryan Connolly (presenter) =

American YouTuber (born 1982)

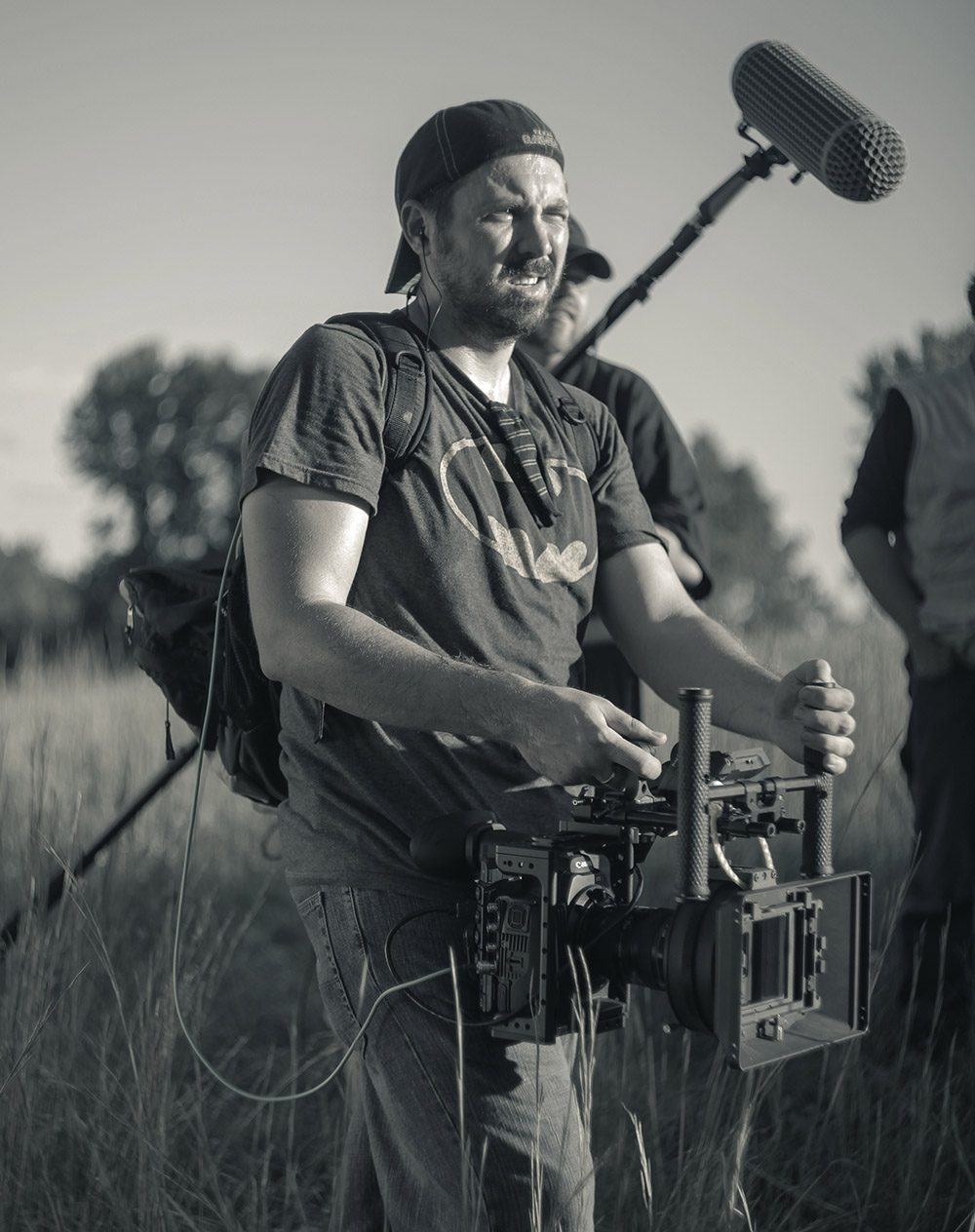
- Ryan Connolly in 2013
- Born: February 25, 1982 (age 44)
- Education: Full Sail University
- Occupation: Videographer
- Known for: Film Riot
- Website: Film Riot Website

Ryan Connolly (born February 25, 1982) is YouTuber who hosts the web show Film Riot. He is known for Ballistic (2018), Proximity (2013) and Tell (2012).

== Early life ==
Connolly attended the technical school Full Sail University.

== Film Riot ==
The first episode was released on May 27, 2009, and the show quickly gained popularity among amateur and professional filmmakers. As of July 2020, the Film Riot YouTube channel has over 1.6 million subscribers.

== Other channels ==
- "Film State," a canceled show for movie news.
- Pimp Your Production, an internet series created / produced by Eric Kessler.

== YouTube Shorts ==
Connolly runs Triune Films, an independent YouTube company in Rowlett, Texas. Through it, he has released multiple shorts.

Film	Release date	Director	Videographer company
Losses	October 22, 2011	Ryan Connolly	Triune Films
Tell	May 23, 2012	Ryan Connolly	Triune Films
Proximity	December 5, 2013	Ryan Connolly	Triune Films
U.F.Oh Yeah	April 2, 2015	Ryan Connolly	Triune Films
Portal Combat	July 14, 2015	Ryan Connolly	Triune Films
Chainsaw	October 12, 2016	Ryan Connolly	Triune Films
Ghost House	October 19, 2016	Ryan Connolly	Triune Films
Westworld to Yuma	May 18, 2017	Ryan Connolly	Triune Films
Sentinel	December 21, 2017	Ryan Connolly	Triune Films
Ballistic	June 27, 2018	Ryan Connolly	Triune Films
There Comes a Knocking	October 28, 2019	Ryan Connolly	Triune Films
