= Tall (surname) =

Tall is an English surname which derived from the Old French word 'de Taille' meaning someone great in height, and it came to England after the Norman Conquest. Notable people with the surname include:

- Ahmadu Tall (1836–1897), Malian imam
- Amadou Tidiane Tall (born 1975), Burkinabé footballer
- David O. Tall (1941–2024), British educator
- El Hadj Umar Tall (c. 1797 – 1864), founder of the Toucouleur Empire
- Gora Tall (born 1985), Senegalese footballer
- Ibrahim Tall (born 1981), Senegalese footballer
- JoAnn Tall (21st century), American environmentalist
- Lida Lee Tall (1873–1942), American university president
- Mamadou Tall (born 1982), Burkinabé footballer
- Modou Tall (born 1953), Senegalese basketball player
- Mountaga Tall (born 1956), Malian politician
- Muntaga Tall, son of Umar Tall
- Siraj Al Tall (born 1982), Jordanian footballer
- Stephen Tall (writer) (1908–1981), American writer
- Stephen Tall (politician) (born 1977), British politician
- Tidiani Tall (c. 1840 – 1888), Faama of Massina
- Tom Tall (1937–2013), American singer
