= Laguna College of Art and Design =

Art school in Laguna Beach, California

- Motto: Empowering Creative Leaders
- Type: Private
- Established: 1961
- President: Mark Saville (Interim)
- Students: 700+
- Undergraduates: 650+
- Location: Laguna Beach, California, United States; 33.561585°N 117.772461°W
- Campus: Suburban
- Website: www.lcad.edu

Laguna College of Art and Design (LCAD) is a private college in Laguna Beach, California. With an enrollment of more than 700 students, the college offers Bachelor of Fine Arts degrees in 11 majors and three Master of Fine Arts degree programs as well as a post-baccalaureate certificate program in Drawing and Painting.

LCAD has an affiliate arrangement with the Florence Academy of Art for summer study in Florence, Italy for class credit. Similar arrangements for Painting and Drawing majors exist with the Art Students League, and for Game Art majors with the Academy for Digital Entertainment at NHTV Breda University of Applied Sciences. In Graphic Design, an association was created in 2011 with the Communication University of China, Beijing. Since 2014, the college has partnered with Vermont College of Fine Arts on a BFA/MAT dual degree program.

== Facilities ==
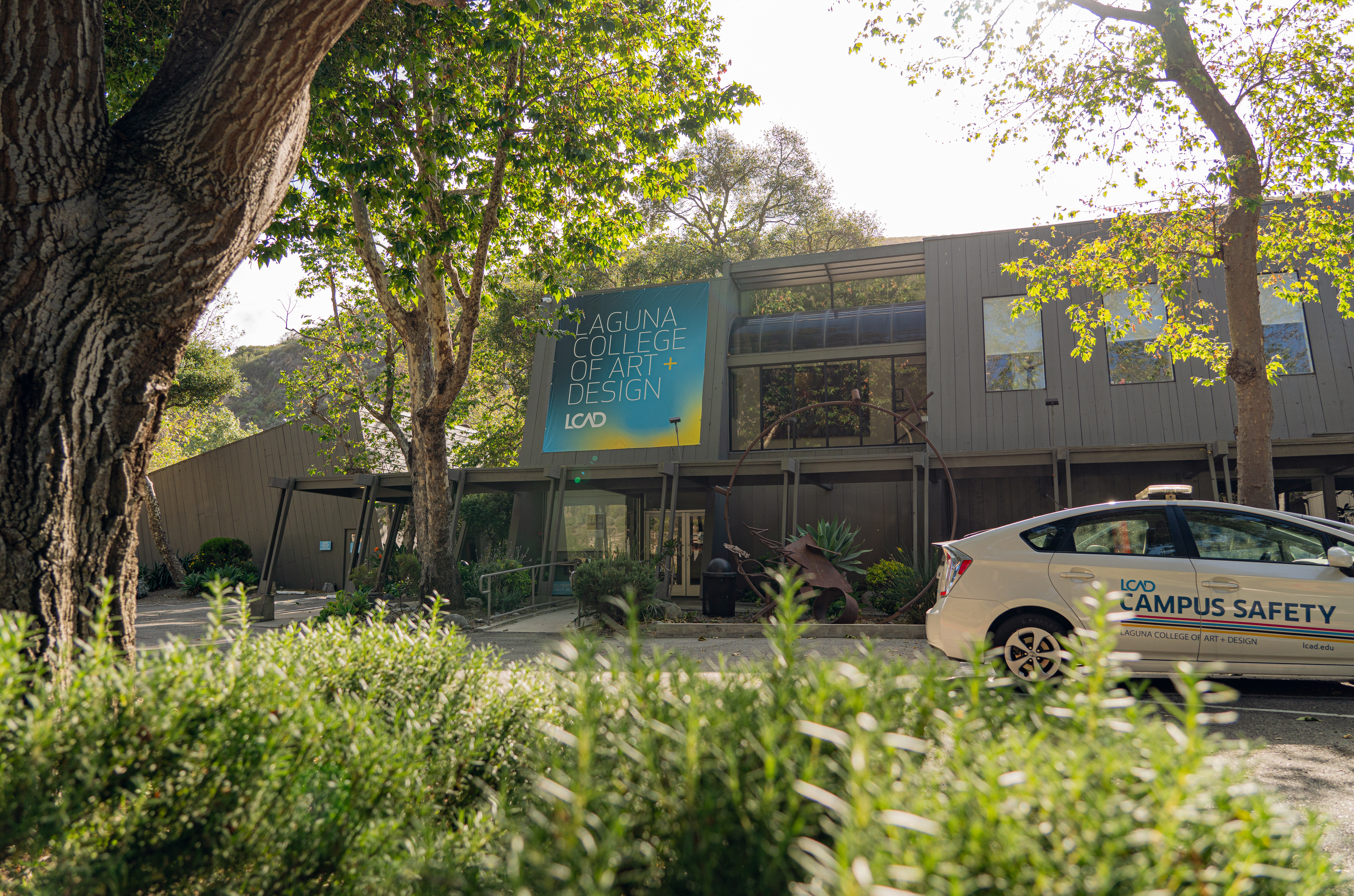
Laguna College of Art and Design Main Campus, 2025

Laguna College of Art and Design's campus sprawls across several scenic acres from the Big Bend area of Laguna Coast Wilderness Park to downtown Laguna Beach. The college's historic Main Campus is situated in Laguna Canyon, on 4 acres (16,000 m^{2}). Across the street are the Suzanne Chonette Senior Studios and LCAD's Administration Building. The college also has a Big Bend campus, a South Campus, student housing, and LCAD Gallery. LCAD maintains the Dennis and Leslie Power Library with access to a multi-media collection including over 20,000 volumes. Laguna Beach is home to artist, festivals, art galleries and beaches. Many students live off-campus, or some on-campus with just a short walk to downtown Laguna Beach.

== Accreditation ==
Laguna College of Art and Design is a non-profit higher education institution accredited by both the National Association of Schools of Art and Design (NASAD) and the Western Association of Schools and Colleges (WASC).
