= Franziska Tell =

German politician (born 1995)

Member of the Bürgerschaft of Bremen
- Incumbent
- Assumed office 8 June 2023

Personal details
- Born: 1995 (age 30–31) Diepholz
- Party: Alliance 90/The Greens

Franziska Tell (born 1995 in Diepholz) is a German politician serving as a member of the Bürgerschaft of Bremen since 2023. From 2023 to 2025, she served as co-spokesperson of the Alliance 90/The Greens in Bremen.
