= Don't Ask Me =

Don't Ask Me may refer to:

- Don't Ask Me (TV programme), a British science show
- Don't Ask Me Ask Britain, a British entertainment poll show
- "Don't Ask Me" (OK Go song)
- "Don't Ask Me" (Heli Simpson song)
- "Don't Ask Me", a song by A Flock of Seagulls from A Flock of Seagulls
- "Don't Ask Me", a song by Nik Kershaw from The Works
- "Don't Ask Me", a song by Public Image Ltd from the album The Greatest Hits, So Far
