= Elisabeth Telling =

American artist (1882–1979)

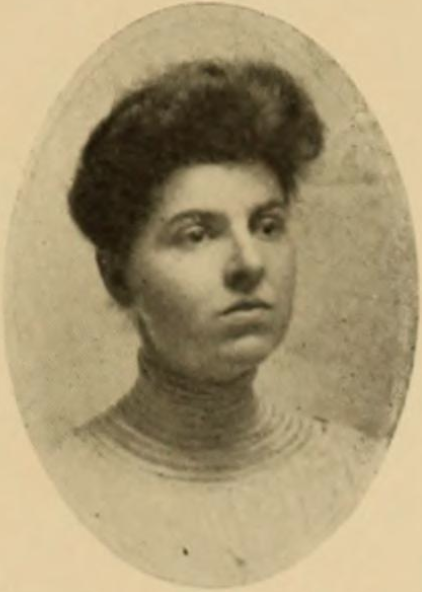
- Elisabeth Telling, from the 1904 yearbook of Smith College
- Born: Elisabeth Irma Telling; July 14, 1882; Milwaukee, Wisconsin, U.S.
- Died: March 30, 1979 (aged 96); Guilford, Connecticut, U.S.
- Occupation: Artist

Elisabeth Irma Telling (July 14, 1882 – March 30, 1979) was an American artist based in Chicago, best known for her ethnographic drawings and portraits of children.

== Early life and education ==
Telling was born in Milwaukee, Wisconsin, the daughter of John E. Telling and Annie Telling. She graduated from Smith College in 1904. After college she studied at the Chicago Academy of Fine Arts, with William Penhallow Henderson, with further studies in Münich and in New England.

== Career ==
Telling was an artist based in Chicago, best known for pastel portraits and drypoint etchings. She had a solo show, "Portrait Drypoints and Drawings by Elisabeth Telling", at the Art Institute of Chicago in 1922. "She has seen the peculiar fitness of etching for expressing those subtle and illusive qualities characteristic of childhood," noted the Art Institute of Chicago of the show's portraits of young sitters. She showed her portraits from her travels in Java, Bali, and Thailand at the Brooklyn Museum in 1932. The Field Museum of Natural History sponsored her ethnographic trips to the Yucatan in 1933, and to Guatemala in 1934. In 1937 she had a joint exhibit with painter Frances Foy at the Art Institute of Chicago. She also exhibited works in Philadelphia, Los Angeles, and Washington, D.C.

Telling donated many of her ethnographic pastel drawings to the Field Museum, where they were exhibited in a 1957 show titled "Peasants and Princes: Portraits of Human Types in Indonesia and Central America".

== Publications ==
- "Radan Mas Ario Djojodipoero" (1932, article, Smith Alumnae Quarterly)

== Death and legacy ==
Telling died in 1979, at the age of 96, in Guilford, Connecticut. Smith College Archives has some of Telling's papers, including correspondence, diaries, and photographs. Her work is in the collections of museums including the Delaware Art Museum.
