= Laguna Canyon Project =

Long-term environmental art project

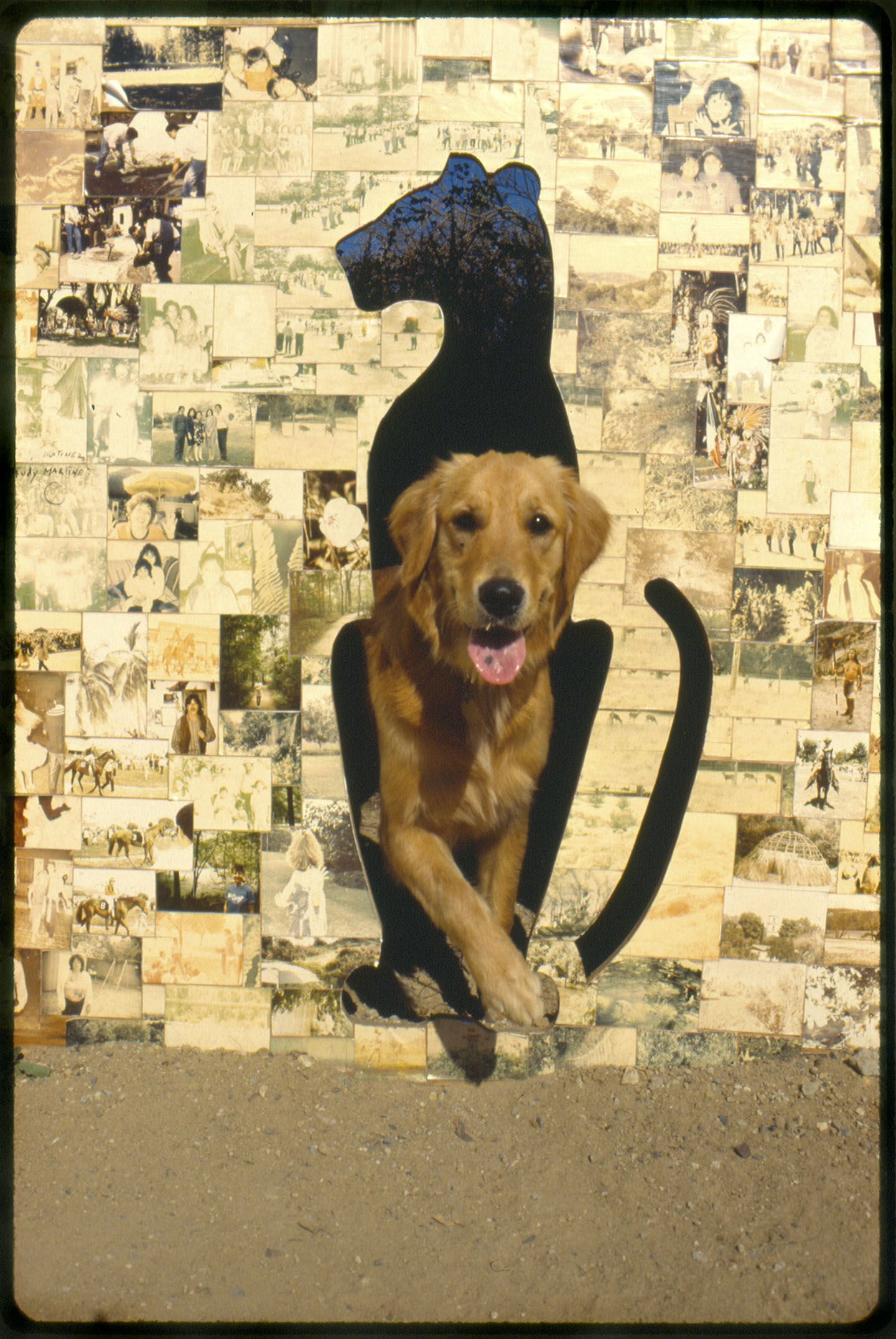
Mountain Lion Door at The Tell

The Laguna Canyon Project (1980–2010), a long-term environmental art project, used a variety of tactics and techniques to focus attention on the bucolic Laguna Canyon Road, one of the last undeveloped passages to the Pacific Ocean. The project, created by photographic artists Jerry Burchfield and Mark Chamberlain, was a response to explosive growth in south Orange County and especially to the threats of development within their hometown of Laguna Beach, California. What began as a 10-year project lasted for three decades.

Over its first 10 years, the project drew an ever-expanding number of supporters. It empowered local artists and concerned citizens to get actively involved in the fate of the Canyon, while informing the greater Orange County, California about the environmental issues.

The project reached its high point in 1989 when, in celebration of the Orange County Centennial and the Sesquicentennial of the discovery of photography, the art partners erected a giant photographic mural in a critical location of the Canyon. They built this 636-foot-long mural, entitled The Tell, in the Sycamore Hills area of Laguna Coast Wilderness Park.

As this public installation was located on Laguna Canyon Road—the main artery into Laguna Beach—and across this road from a proposed massive housing development, it became the focal point and catalyst for massive public demonstrations, protesting that project.

The Tell ultimately served a crucial role in the preservation of this region.

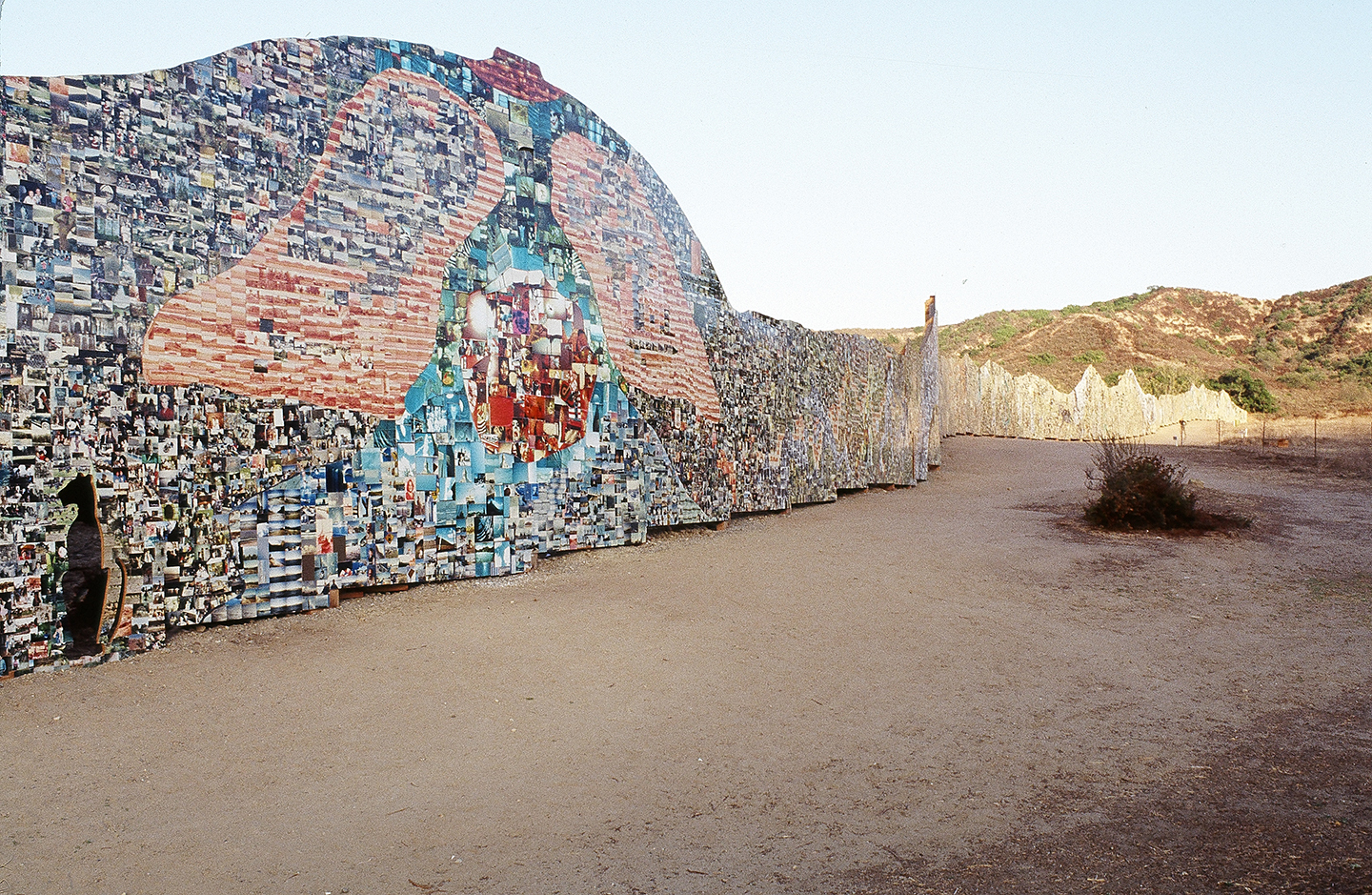
The Green Man at The Tell

From October 18, 2015, through January 17, 2016, an exhibition on the Laguna Canyon Project, titled "The Canyon Project: Artivism," was held at Laguna Art Museum, Laguna Beach, California.

The book, "The Laguna Canyon Project: Refining Artivism," was published in 2018 by Laguna Wilderness Press.

== Genesis of Laguna Canyon Project ==
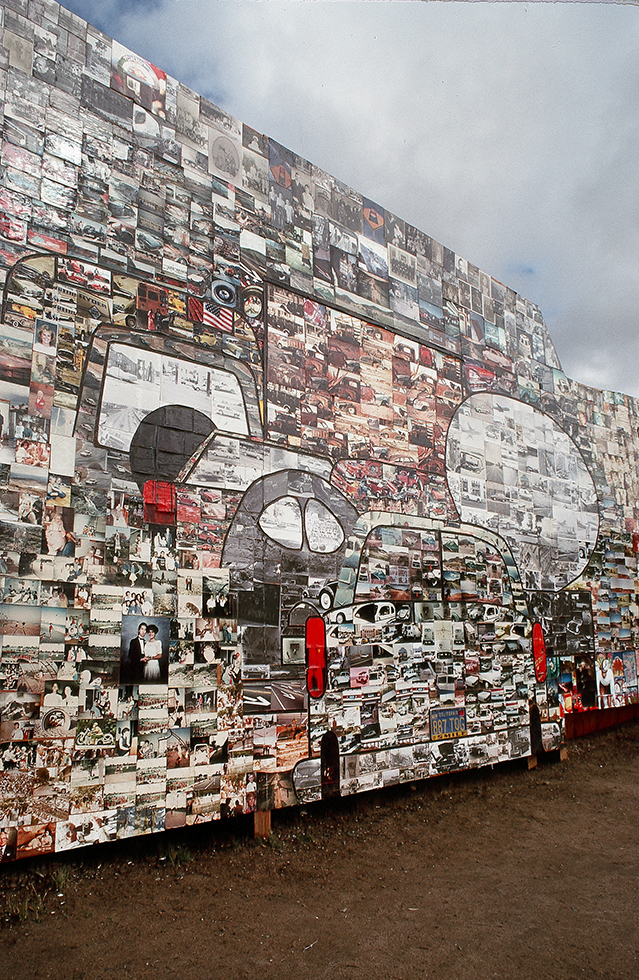
Throat of The Tell Photomural

Jerry Burchfield and Mark Chamberlain (photographer)s opened BC Space, a combination photo lab/studio/ gallery in 1973, to provide photographic services for galleries, museums and artists. During their many hours working together, they often discussed what they could do to protect the Laguna Canyon. They ultimately agreed upon a course of action and in the spring of 1980 commenced the "Laguna Canyon Project: The Continuous Document," their long-term environmental art project. The immediate goal was to preserve the canyon in the tradition of documentary photography, while challenging the community to preserve it in reality.

For Phase I of the project, with a handful of volunteers, they photographed both sides of the Laguna Canyon Road. The resulting 646 frames per side were printed into twin color prints, depicting their passage down the “last nine miles of the westward migration.”

== Evolution to performance art ==
Soon after, they repeated the survey, but this time at night, and dubbed it Phase III, "Nightlight Documentation.” Publicity from these ventures was beginning to generate responses from people offering to help with future phases. The partners also realized that the project's phases were turning into performance art, in addition to documentation.

The next phase was to “paint the canyon with light.” This phase took two years of planning, required more people, expensive equipment, and permits from multiple level governmental agencies. The pair lobbied regional environmental groups, the art community, and local public officials for permission and support.

In September 1983, Chamberlain and Burchfield executed Phase V, "Primary Light Documentation,” requiring 65 designated participants (plus backup) obtained 13 vehicles and a 30,000-watt generator, towed by a 40-foot flatbed truck. They moved this entire caravan down Laguna Canyon Road from 6 PM to 6 AM, while escorted by three different police agencies and Caltrans officials. The resulting images were printed onto a single print 3.5 inches wide by 516 feet long, depicting the entire length of the Northeast side of the road in kaleidoscopic color.

== The Tell photographic mural ==
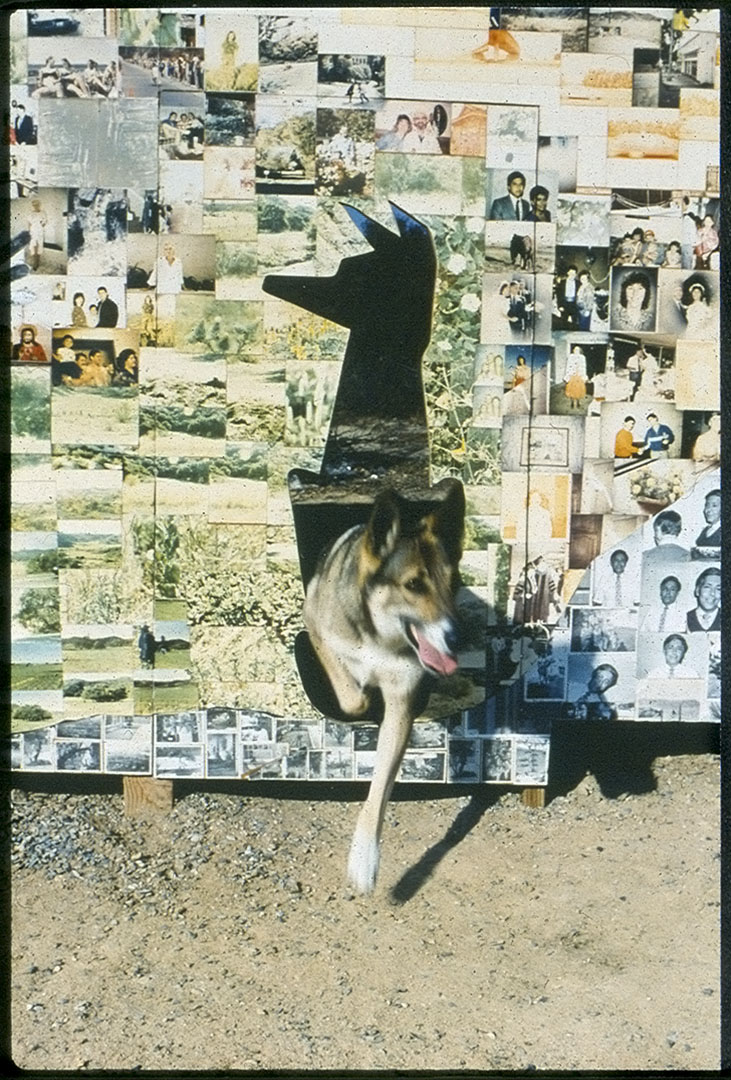
Coyote Door at The Tell

By 1987, core samples were being taken for Southern California's first toll road, which would bisect Laguna Canyon, and maps were being drawn for the 3,200-unit Laguna Laurel housing development, which the road would serve. Construction for both was scheduled to begin in 1989. In response to these expected developments, Burchfield and Chamberlain began extensive lobbying to execute their next phase, which was to build a giant photographic mural in the canyon, directly in the path of the toll road, and across the highway from the proposed new city.

On May 1, 1989, after three years of planning and months of fundraising, the art partners, along with a growing army of environmentalists, began constructing an outdoor photographic mural called The Tell. Since 1989 was the Centennial of Orange County, CA and the 150th anniversary of the discovery of photography, they decided that the project would be composed of photographs contributed by local residents and by people from all over the country. The installation would express concern, artistically, about the survival of the historic Laguna Canyon. When completed, Phase VIII, The Tell was a contemporary mound of artifacts and an environmental artwork, which reflected the community's past and looked to its future.

The name "Tell" comes from the archeological term for a mound of artifacts from prior civilizations, buried over by natural elements. This Tell was built (rather than unearthed) as a small mountain composed of thousands of photographs, reflective of the lives of the people who donated images. It grew to 636-feet long and ranged from 36-feet high, dwindling down to the ground, as it undulated across the landscape and dove back into the hillside. The sculptural character of the artwork resembled the voluptuous nature of the surrounding canyons, with echoes of a female figure in its shape. It had a stylized Easter Island head as its physical and philosophical foundation.

The pictures, glued onto the wooden framework, were woven together like pixels in a pointillist painting by density, color, content and type of material. They told numerous stories of man, woman and the land. These symbols were positioned by story lines on the chakra points of the larger body of the mural.

Visitors to The Tell in the early spring saw vibrant, colorful images of themselves, their families and friends as part of the very large art work. Later in the summer and fall, as the canyon was transformed into desert colors, these photos and stories faded to become a part of the background fabric of a larger story of man's relationship with Spaceship Earth.

During the months of construction, the mural became the focal point and catalyst for numerous events and demonstrations. Some were planned and many happened spontaneously.

== The Tell dedication ==
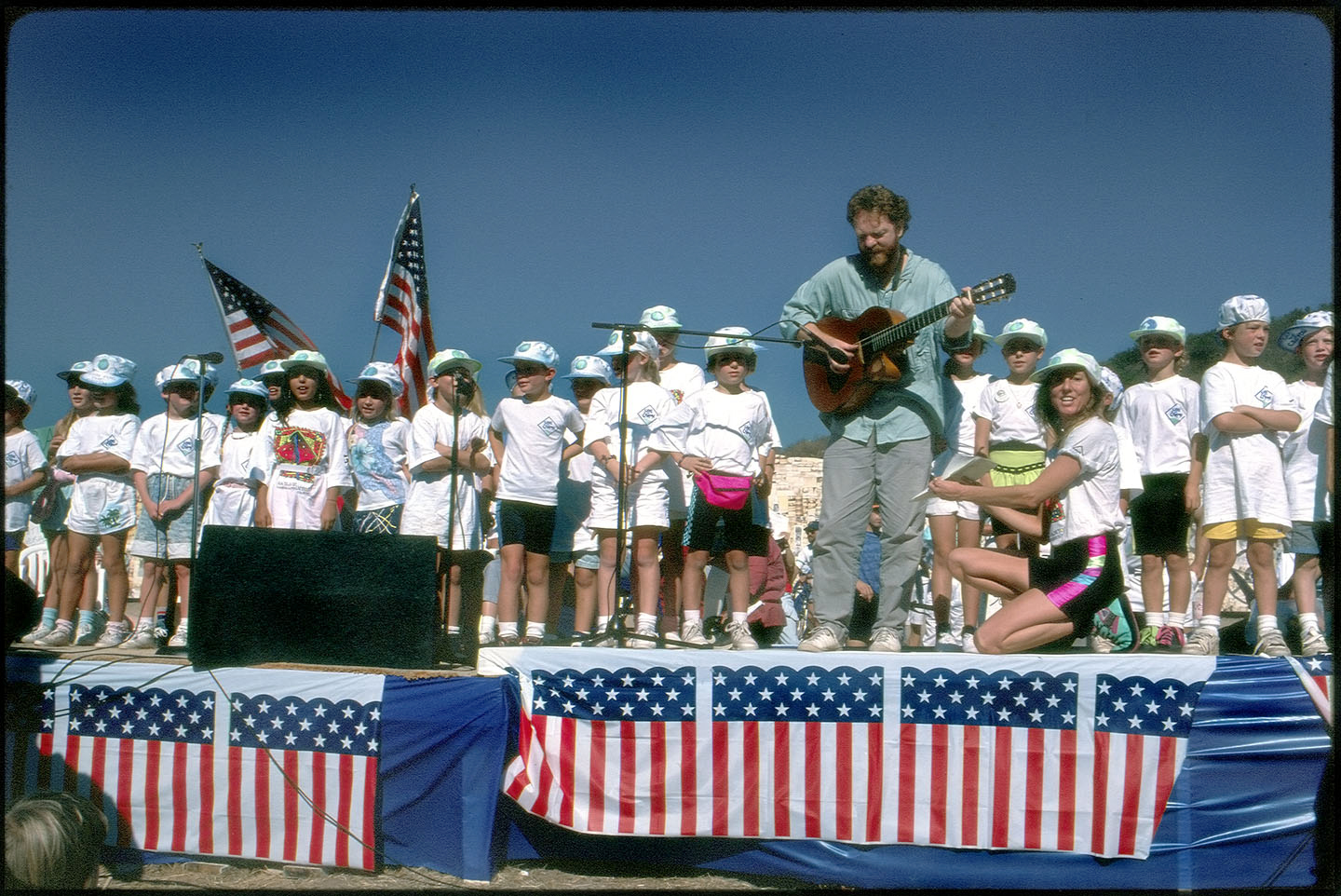
Mark Turnbull at the Tell

More than 2,500 people attended the August 19, 1989 dedication of The Tell, erected in Laguna's Sycamore Hills area, including scores of environmental groups from all across the county. The installation also attracted media attention, including articles in the Los Angeles Times, Orange County Register and Life.

When The Tell was dismantled, it was coded and stored with the hope that it would be installed in a museum. But it was so politically charged that no art organization would assist in its preservation. Lacking safe storage, most of the photographic mural burned in the Laguna Beach fire of 1993.

Unlike an actual Tell, the structure was carefully removed to leave little evidence in the land it was attempting to save. All that remains at the site today are 88 barely visible postholes filled with pea gravel rhythmically spaced on the hillside for future explorers to discover.

From October 18, 2015, through January 17, 2016, an exhibition on the Project, titled "The Canyon Project: Artivism," including pieces of "The Tell," was held at Laguna Art Museum, Laguna Beach, California.

== The Walk ==
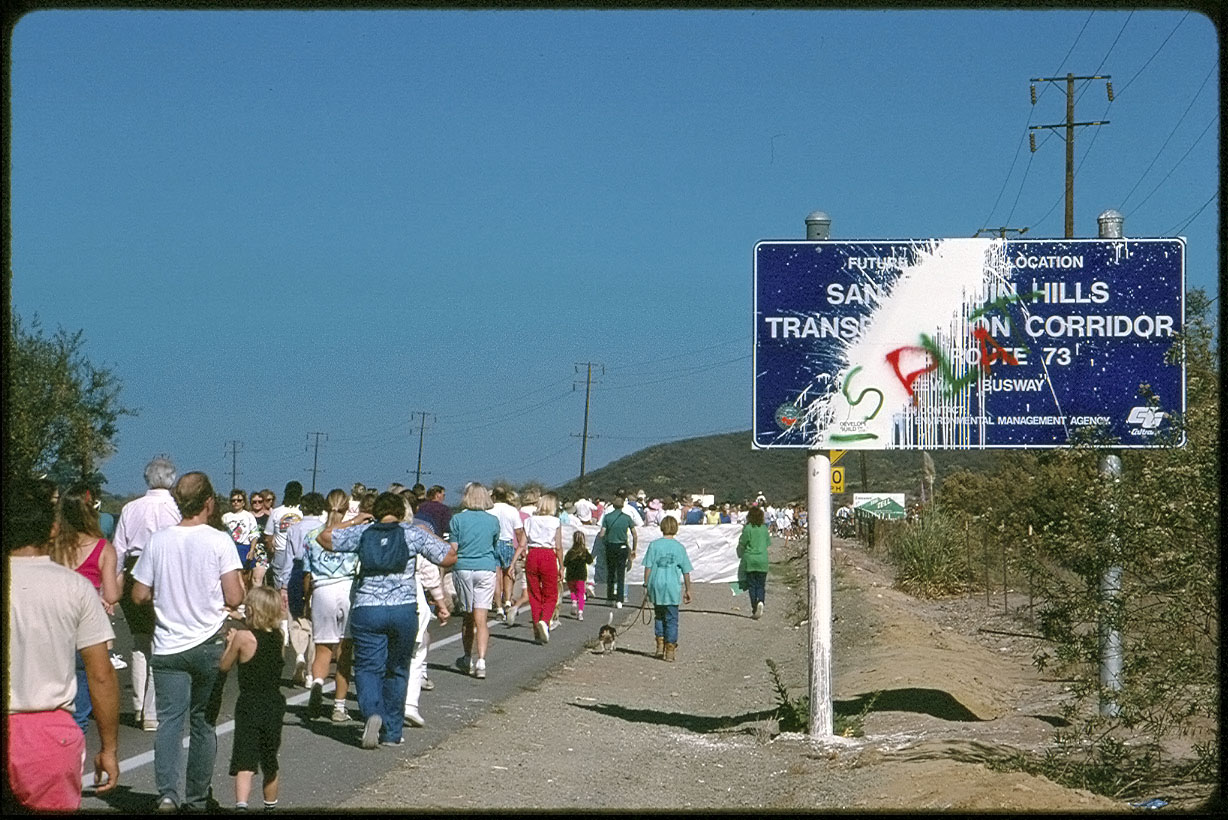
The Walk to Save Laguna Canyon

On November 11, 1989, The Tell became the destination for an estimated 8,000 to 11,000 people who marched there from downtown Laguna for the "Walk to Save Laguna Canyon." These participants then held a demonstration protesting the proposed 3,200 unit Laguna Laurel housing development, which was scheduled to be built across the road from The Tell site.

The Walk to the protest site drew an estimated 8,000–10,000 people and served as the catalyst for saving the canyon. Those there on that eventful day November 11, 1989 will forever remember the excitement, the exhilaration of the roaring crowd and the beauty of the peaceful moment we heard the founder of the Laguna Canyon Conservancy (LCC), Councilwoman Lida Lenny say, "Boy am I glad you are here!". The Walk from the Festival of Arts grounds to "The Tell" at Sycamore Flats where Mayor Bob Gentry led a crowd honoring Veterans being recognized and acknowledged for their contributions to preserving and saving America in WW II.

The cry was "Save Laguna Canyon" which was threatened by the approved Irvine Company 3,200 housing tract Irvine Company development called Laguna Laurel. Much of the thanks goes to two marketing and political savvy individuals who stepped up to the plate; Harry Huggins and Charles Michael Murray. They brought forth the concept and to hold the rally at this location and instrumental in its success. LCC President Carolyn Wood helped to raise public awareness to save the canyon uniting the community. The LCC was the lead group, but co-sponsors were Laguna Greenbelt, Village Laguna, the City of Laguna Beach and the Chamber of Commerce. Harry Huggins was the executive director of The Walk and what a success it was bringing an estimated 10,000 protesters, and the Irvine Company to their negotiating knees.

Harry Huggins and Charles Michael Murray and committees did stellar work garnering great publicity for "The Walk" obtaining Jose Feliciano radio public service announcements. Committee chairs included Richard Henrikson, Kurt Cornell, Joel Easton, Linda Eckman, Ken Kube, Camille Bertolet, Jim and Linda Rushing among others listed in the image above. The LCC had one sole employee Executive Director Mike Phillips, a former newspaper reporter, who made many contributions.

The protest soon resulted in an agreement between Laguna Beach and the Irvine Company for the city's acquisition of five canyon parcels. A city bond measure approved by almost 80 percent of Laguna voters raised $20 million toward the purchase price of $78 million by means of a property tax increase on every property in the city for 20 years (Laguna Greenbelt n.d.).

Largely as a consequence of months of community involvement in the building of the mural, and of this dramatic public display, the Irvine Company negotiated with the cities of Irvine and Laguna Beach to release that land for public acquisition. In 1990, A city bond measure overwhelmingly approved by almost 80 percent of Laguna voters raised $20 million toward the purchase price of $78 million by means of a property tax increase on every property in the city for 20 years (Laguna Greenbelt n.d.). Laguna residents voted overwhelmingly to tax themselves to purchase the land to keep it as open space.

== Laguna Beach environment ==
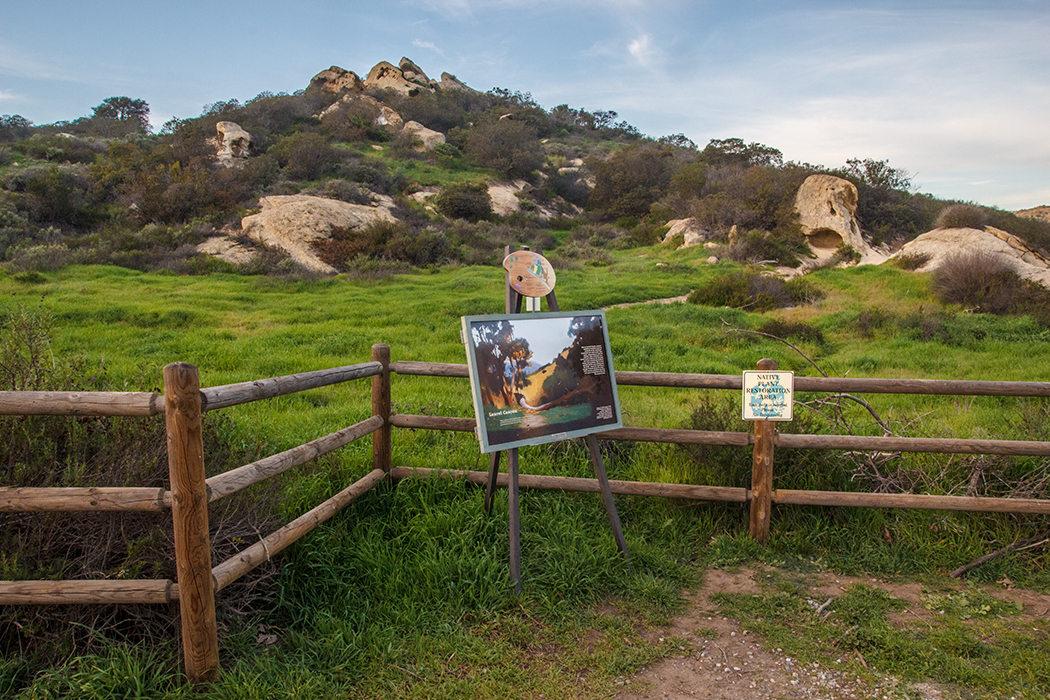
Laguna Coast Wilderness Park entrance

The most traveled route into town is the nine-mile Laguna Canyon Road within the 7,000-acre (2,800 ha) Laguna Coast Wilderness Park, which has some of the last remaining undeveloped coastal canyons in Southern California. The park is dominated by coastal sage scrub, cactus and native grasses. Over 40 endangered and sensitive species call Laguna Coast home, including California gnatcatcher, cactus wren, and the endemic Laguna Beach dudleya. Drive further down the road toward the Pacific Ocean, and you pass the campus of Laguna College of Art and Design, artists’ studios, numerous public art pieces, and three world famous summer art festivals.

Laguna's artistic legacy stretches back to the late 19th and early 20th centuries when people from across this country and Europe, many steeped in French Impressionism, moved to this area. Artists, including Frank Cuprien, Joseph Kleitsch and William Wendt, settled here, formed an art colony and used Canyon landscapes as subjects of their paintings. They employed the broad-brush strokes and pure, bright colors of their earlier French counterparts to capture the canyons; their artistic style came to be called California Impressionism. These paintings, displayed all over Laguna today, have transcendent qualities, expressing reverence for the beauty of the land. As you drive, hike or bike through Laguna Canyon, you can view vistas evocative of these paintings.

== Additional phases of Laguna Canyon Project ==
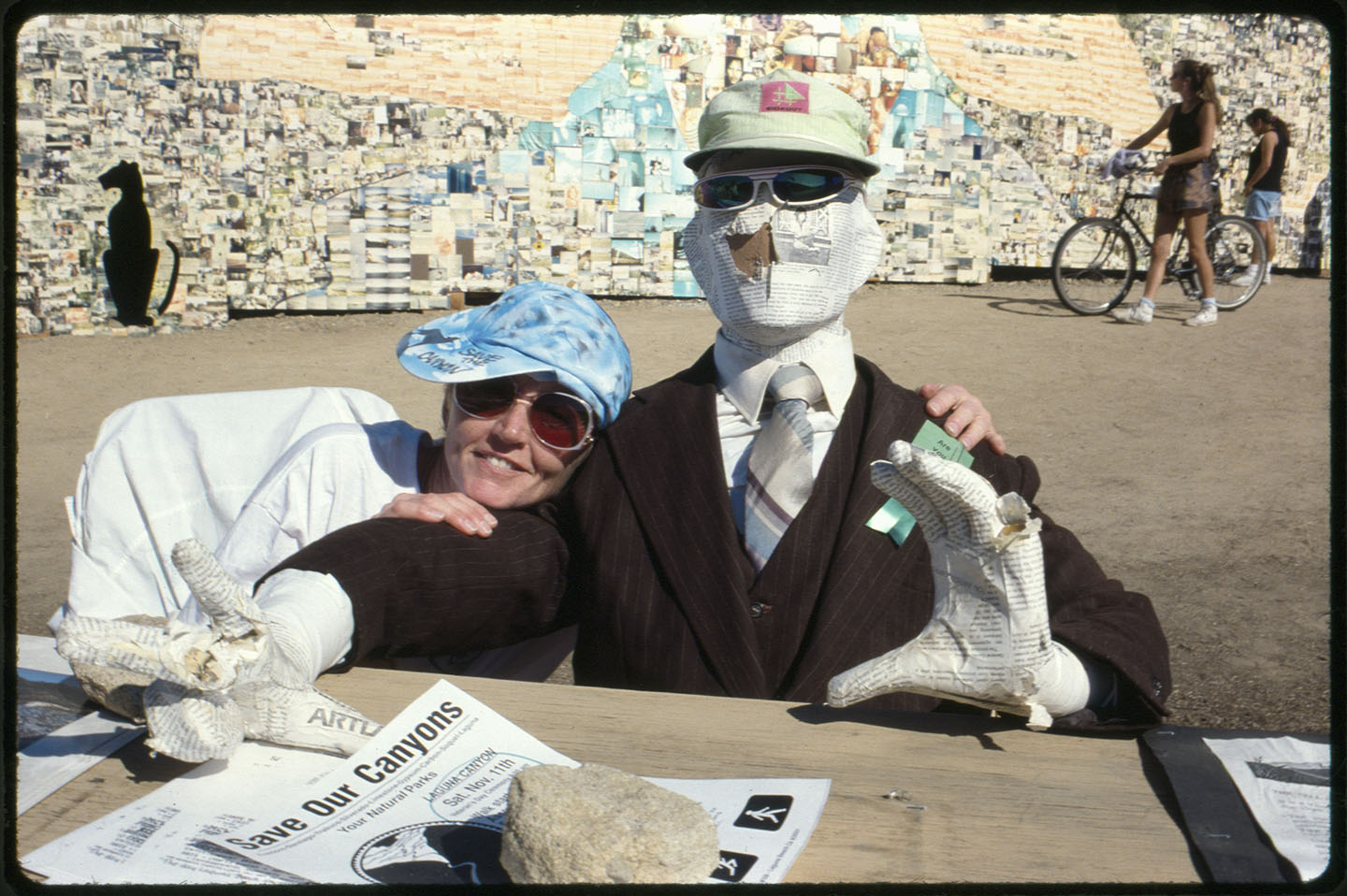
Irvine Man at The Tell

- Phase IX: The Daylight Document II, April 1990
- Phase X: The Nightlight Document II, November 1990
- Phase XI: “Tales of The Tell” Exhibition, BC Space, Fall 1990
- Phase XII: “The Witness Box,” July 26, 1994
- Phase XIII: Into Grace Under Fire, December 21, 1994
- Phase XIV: The Daylight Document III, April 2000
- Phase XV' The Nightlight Document III, November 2000
- Phase XVI: The Daylight Document IV, Final Phase, June 21, 2010. A dozen participants documented the nine-mile Laguna Canyon Road.
