= Don't Ask, Don't Tell (disambiguation) =

Don't ask, don't tell (1993–2011) is a common name for U.S. military's sexual orientation policy.

Don't Ask, Don't Tell may also refer to:

== Film and TV ==
- Don't Ask Don't Tell (film), a 2002 comedy film
- "Don't Ask, Don't Tell" (Doctors), a 2004 television episode
- "Don't Ask, Don't Tell" (Roseanne), a 1994 television episode
- "Don't Ask, Don't Tell" (Ugly Betty), a 2007 television episode

== Music ==
- Don't Ask, Don't Tell (album), a 1994 album by Come
- "Don't Ask, Don't Tell", a song by Chelsea Grin from Evolve
- "Don't Ask Don't Tell", a song by Everglow from Last Melody
- "Don't Ask, Don't Tell", a song by Tove Lo from Blue Lips

== See also ==
- Don't Ask, a 1994 album by Australian singer Tina Arena
- Don't Ask, Don't Tell Repeal Act of 2010, a 2010 legislation to repeal the policy
- Don't Ask Me (disambiguation)
