= Teller =

Teller or telling may refer to:

== People ==
- Teller (surname)
- Teller (magician), one half of the duo Penn & Teller

== Places ==
- Teller, Alaska, United States
  - Teller Airport
- Teller County, Colorado, United States

== Other uses ==
- 5006 Teller, a minor planet
- Bank teller
  - Automated teller machine
- Teller (elections), a person who counts the votes in a vote
- Teller Amendment, a 1898 amendment to a joint resolution of the United States Congress
- Teller House, a historic hotel in Central City, Colorado
- Teller mine, a German-made antitank mine common in World War II
- Teller Peak, Antarctica
- The Tellers, a Belgian rock group
- The Telling, a 2000 science fiction novel by Ursula K. Le Guin
- Being an informant or snitch
