= Teller (surname) =

Origin
- Languages: Dutch, Low German, German, Jewish (Yiddish: טעֶלעֶר teler)
- Meaning: 1. MHG: telle meant "gorge, ravine" - person living on or from places like gorge, ravine 2. MHG, MLG: teller "plate, turntable" - manufacturer of these products 3. Low German nickname, Low German: teller, teler means "parents, father" 4. MLG (Low German) teller, teler also meant "farmer, [cultivator], or builder" 5. Dutch teller, as in a bank teller (tellen meaning "to count" in Dutch)
- Region of origin: Netherlands, Denmark, Germany, Hungary, United States

Other names
- Variant forms: Czech: Talíř (cs); Jewish: Tellermann, Tellerman, Tellering, Tellerbaum, Tellerroth ()

Teller is the name of:

- Wilhelm Abraham Teller (1734–1804), a German Protestant theologian
- Henry M. Teller (1830–1914), a US politician
- Leopold Teller (1844–1908), a Hungarian actor
- Charlotte Teller (1876–1953)
- Edward Teller (1908, Budapest – 2003), a Hungarian-US nuclear physicist known colloquially as "the father of the hydrogen bomb"
- Ludwig Teller (1911, Manhattan – 1965), a US Naval lieutenant and political figure
- Teller (magician) (born Raymond Joseph Teller, in 1948, Philadelphia), a US magician, a member of the comedy and magic duo "Penn and Teller"
- Janne Teller (born 1964), a Danish author
- Juergen Teller (born 1964), a German photographer
- Miles Teller (born 1987), an American actor
- Wyatt Teller (born 1994), American football player

== See also ==
- Teller (disambiguation)
