= Tell (2012 film) =

2012 short psychological horror film

- Directed by: Ryan Connolly
- Written by: Ryan Connolly
- Produced by: Brad Bruening; Tim Connolly; Ryan Connolly; Todd Bruno
- Starring: Todd Bruno; Shana Eva; Brigitte Kali Canales; Adriana Pascual; Tim Connolly
- Cinematography: Ryan Connolly
- Edited by: Ryan Connolly
- Music by: Daniel James
- Distributed by: Triune Films
- Release date: May 23, 2012
- Running time: 33 minutes
- Country: United States
- Budget: $30,000
- Box office: $0

Tell is a 2012 short psychological horror film written, directed, and edited by Ryan Connolly. It is loosely based on Edgar Allan Poe's 1843 short story "The Tell-Tale Heart".

The production of this film has been the subject of many episodes of Film Riot, an Internet television show hosted by Connolly. Many of the crew that worked on the film also feature in Film Riot, and the effects used in the film have been explained in detail as part of the programmes.

== Plot ==
Taylor argues with his girlfriend Jenny, before taking a hammer from his car and murdering her. He then wraps her body in a sheet, takes her upstairs, and hides her in his attic. He then phones Ray of the crime. Referencing an earlier conversation in which a drunken Ray had suggested murdering Jenny, Taylor tries to convince him to help cover up the crime. Ray declines, leaving Taylor to deal with the consequences alone.

While cleaning Jenny's blood, Taylor hears something moving in the attic and hears Jenny screaming. Whilst investigating, he finds blood dripping from the loft hatch, and goes up to investigate, where he finds the body as he left it. He then slips on the blood, knocked unconscious. On regaining consciousness, Terra, Jenny's friend, arrives. Taylor tells her that she has walked out, and left her phone. Fearing that Terra knows of the murder, he arms himself with a kitchen knife, but she leaves before he attacks her. He later encounters another apparition of Jenny.

When Police Officer Diaz knocks on the door, Taylor feebly tries to stop her from entering the house. When she does, she begins to search the ground floor and, on finding nothing, goes to search upstairs. Taylor again attempts to convince her that there is no issue but is ordered to remain downstairs whilst Diaz searches the upper floor. Diaz does not enter the bathroom, and therefore does not discover Jenny's body, but Taylor stabs her in the neck as she turns to leave. The two struggle silently, with Taylor pushing Diaz's gun down into its holster to protect himself. He is interrupted by an apparition of Jenny standing at the door, giving Diaz time to draw her weapon and shoot him. The two separate, and fall against opposite sides of the room, where they sit against the walls, dying.

== Cast ==
Tell's cast is made up of family and friends of Connolly, as well as professional actors.

- Todd Bruno as Taylor:
  A timid and weak-minded man who murders his girlfriend, Jenny. This action haunts him, and his guilt eventually drives him insane. He is killed when Police Officer Diaz shoots him in self defence. Taylor's role is equivalent to that of the narrator in "The Tell-Tale Heart". As with the story, the film is shot from Taylor's perspective, allowing the audience to experience his hallucinations, though it is never confirmed whether he is hallucinating or if the spirit of his girlfriend is genuinely haunting him.
- Shana Eva as Jenny:
  Taylor's sharp-tongued live-in girlfriend. The two argue regularly when Taylor fails to return home in the evenings, and does not provide a reason. During one such argument, Taylor hits her with a hammer, killing her. He then hides her body in their attic, before returning later in the evening to dispose of it. Throughout the film, Taylor sees hallucinations of Jenny, driving him mad. Jenny is the equivalent of the victim in "The Tell-Tale Heart", although the motive and method of murder differ from the original story.
- Tim Connolly as Ray:
  Ray is a friend of Taylor. One night, whilst drunk, Ray jokingly suggests to Taylor that he should hit Jenny the next time she shouts at him. Taking this for a serious proposition, Taylor acts on this suggestion by fatally striking Jenny and then phoning Ray for help. Ray, disgusted, and initially believing Taylor is joking, refuses to help after realizing the truth behind Taylor's call.
- Brigitte Kali Canales as Terra:
  Terra is Jenny's friend. Terra receives a call from Jenny shortly before being murdered, prompting her to visit the house. Taylor convinces her that Jenny walked out after their argument, and Terra leaves, unaware of the truth, and that Taylor was ready to kill her should she find out.
- Adriana Pascual as Police Officer Diaz:
  Diaz is called to Taylor's house by local residents who heard the argument between him and Jenny. She investigates the house, and is attacked by Taylor, who is trying to cover up Jenny's murder. After a struggle, Diaz shoots Taylor in self defense. Diaz's character is the equivalent of the Police Officers in "The Tell-Tale Heart", although her counterparts in the story are not killed; instead, the narrator is driven so insane that he confesses the crime willingly.

== Release ==
Tell was made available on May 23, 2012, for free via YouTube. Connolly promoted it on his Twitter account, and via the Triune Films Facebook page. It was featured by Short of the Week on May 25, 2012, and awarded a rating of 4.5 out of a possible 5. Digital Hippos also rated it 4.5/5, and Cole Abaius of Film School Rejects described it as a "stellar work on a shoestring budget." Following its release, and positive audience reaction, a limited DVD and Blu-ray run was released on May 25, 2012, with an extra run being released on September 28. The released version included a behind the scenes documentary, outtakes, and a director's commentary by Connolly. Pre-orders of the original run included a copy of the shooting script, signed by Connolly.

=== Soundtrack ===
In February 2012, the music used in the trailer, composed by Vitaliy Zavadskyy, was released as a single on the iTunes Store. On May 1, the full soundtrack was also released as an album on iTunes and Amazon MP3. The soundtrack was composed by Daniel James, and consists of 9 tracks from throughout the film.

#	Title	Length
1	"Hammer & Blood"	2:39
2	"Hiding the Body"	2:23
3	"I Hit Her"	3:18
4	"Attic Noises"	4:26
5	"Ghostly Visions"	1:34
6	"Suspicion"	3:14
7	"Cut Her Up"	3:54
8	"Quietus"	8:44
9	"End Credits"	2:00
