= Laguna Coast Wilderness Park =

Wilderness area in California, United States

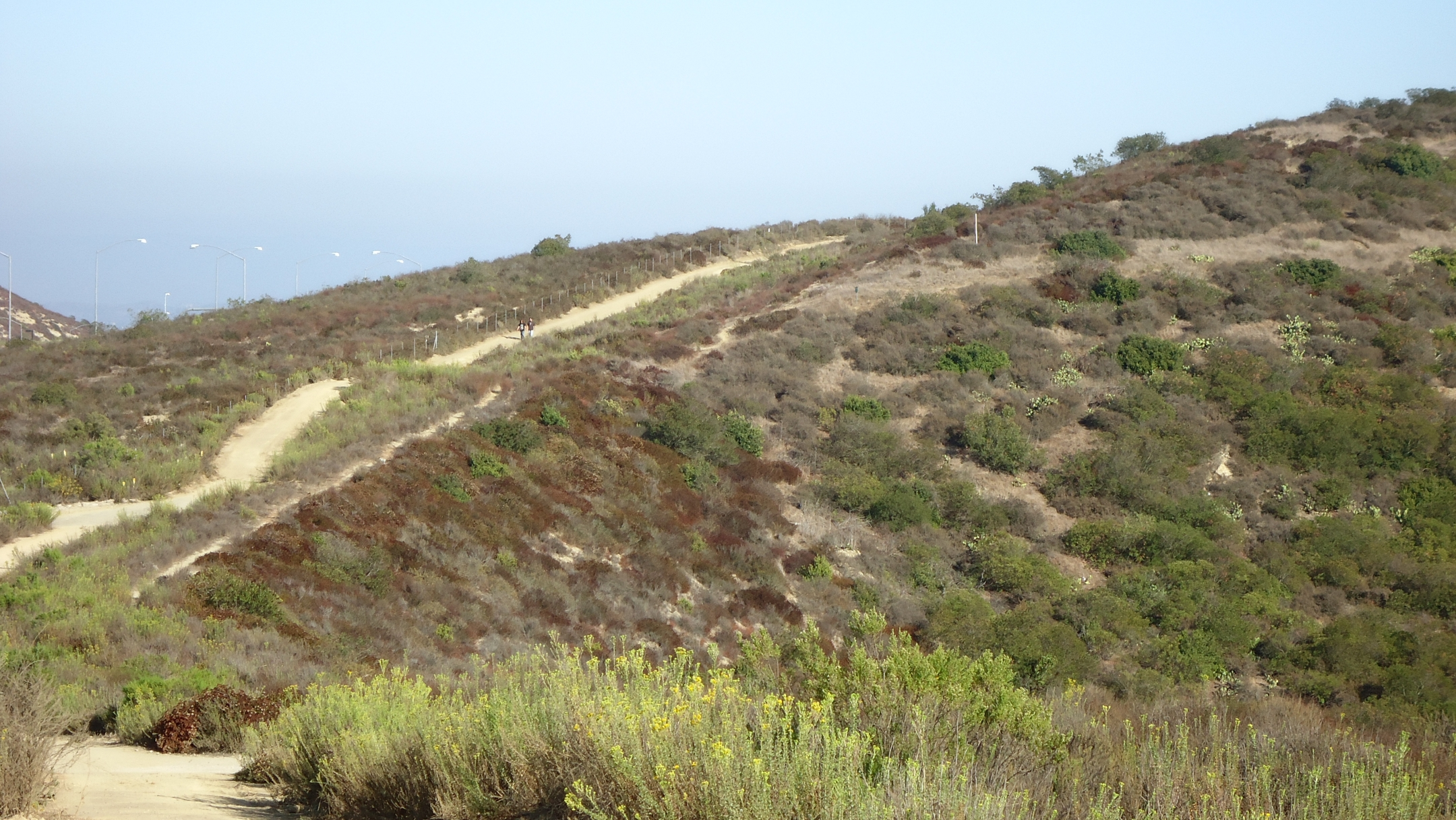
- Boomer Ridge Trail, Laguna Coast Wilderness Park

- Location within the Los Angeles metropolitan area Location within California Location within the United States
- Interactive map of Laguna Coast Wilderness Park
- Location: San Joaquin Hills, Orange County, California
- Nearest city: Laguna Beach, California
- Coordinates: 33°34′27″N 117°46′33″W
- Area: 7,000 acres (2,800 ha)
- Governing body: Orange County Parks
- Website: www.ocparks.com/lagunacoast/

Laguna Coast Wilderness Park is a 7,000-acre (2,800 ha) wilderness area in the San Joaquin Hills surrounding Laguna Beach, California. This park features coastal canyons, ridgeline views and the only natural lakes in Orange County, California. Trails are maintained for hiking and mountain biking with a wide range of difficulty, from beginner to expert. Most trails gain in height, reaching a maximum of 1,000 feet (300 m) in elevation. Several trails lead to downtown Laguna Beach.

Laguna Coast Wilderness Park has some of the last remaining undeveloped coastal canyons in Southern California. The park is dominated by coastal sage scrub, cactus and native grasses. Over 40 endangered and sensitive species call Laguna Coast home including California gnatcatcher, cactus wren and the endemic Dudleya stolonifera. Both Laguna Coast, Aliso and Wood Canyons Wilderness Park are also home to mule deer, long-tailed weasel, healthy bobcat populations, and raptors like red-tailed hawk and the ground-nesting northern harrier.

== South Coast Wilderness ==
Laguna Coast Wilderness Park is part of the contiguous approximately 20,000-acre (8,100 ha) South Coast Wilderness area in southern Orange County, California. It stretches from Newport Beach to Laguna Niguel, and from Irvine to the Pacific Ocean.

The genesis of this designated wilderness area occurred in 1960 when bookstore owner James Dilley began advocating for a Laguna Beach greenbelt. Dilley's dream ultimately required the commitment of thousands of people, more than $65 million and decades to complete.

In 1990, inspired by a quartet of Laguna-based non-profits and by Laguna Beach, Irvine and Laguna Woods, the County of Orange, the State of California and the Irvine Company, voters approved a $20 million bond to purchase Laguna Canyon, to prevent development there and to keep it as an open space green belt forever.

The South Coast Wilderness area offers visitors access to Orange County’s only natural lakes, a wildlife community, nature centers, interpretive programs, and recreational activities, from hiking and birding to mountain biking.

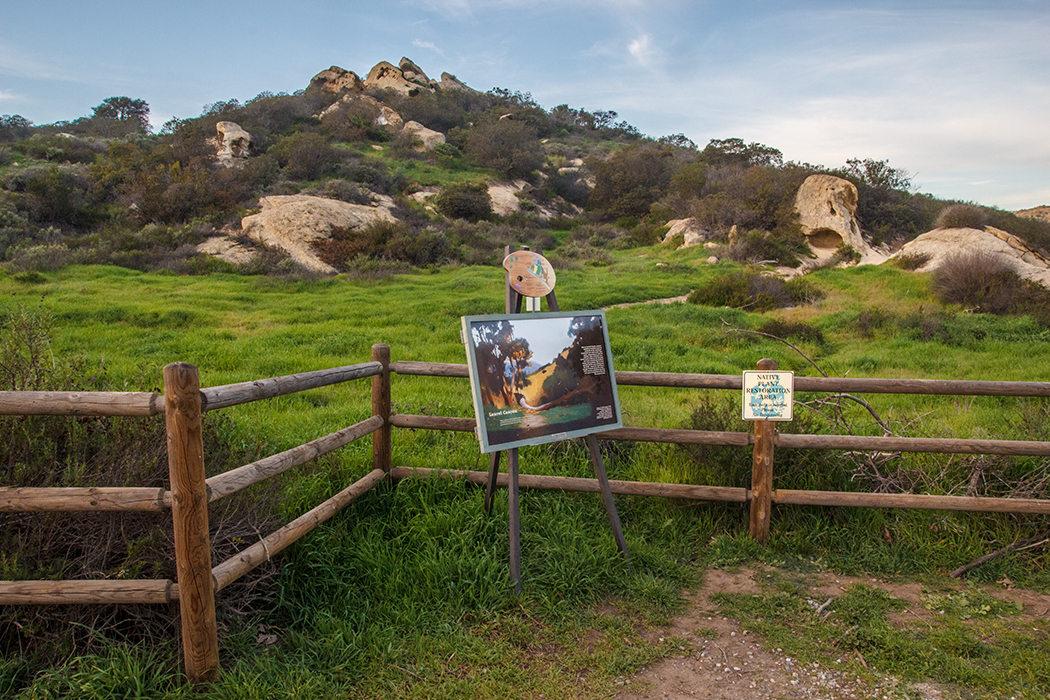
Laguna Coast Wilderness Park entrance

The South Coast Wilderness open space includes:

- Laguna Coast Wilderness Park.
- Aliso and Wood Canyons Wilderness Park, a 4,200-acre (1,700 ha) park of coastal canyon wilderness in Laguna Niguel, California.
- Crystal Cove State Park, a 2,791-acre (1,129 ha) backcountry, wilderness, coastal bluffs, beaches and tide pools. National Register Historic District.
- City of Irvine Open Space Preserve, a 2,339-acre (947 ha) preserve, featuring coastal sage scrub, oak, woodland, grassland and riparian communities.
- City of Newport Beach Open Space, a 254-acre (103 ha) area open for docent-led hiking and biking.
- City of Laguna Woods, 10 acres (4.0 ha) of open space.

== Laguna Greenbelt ==
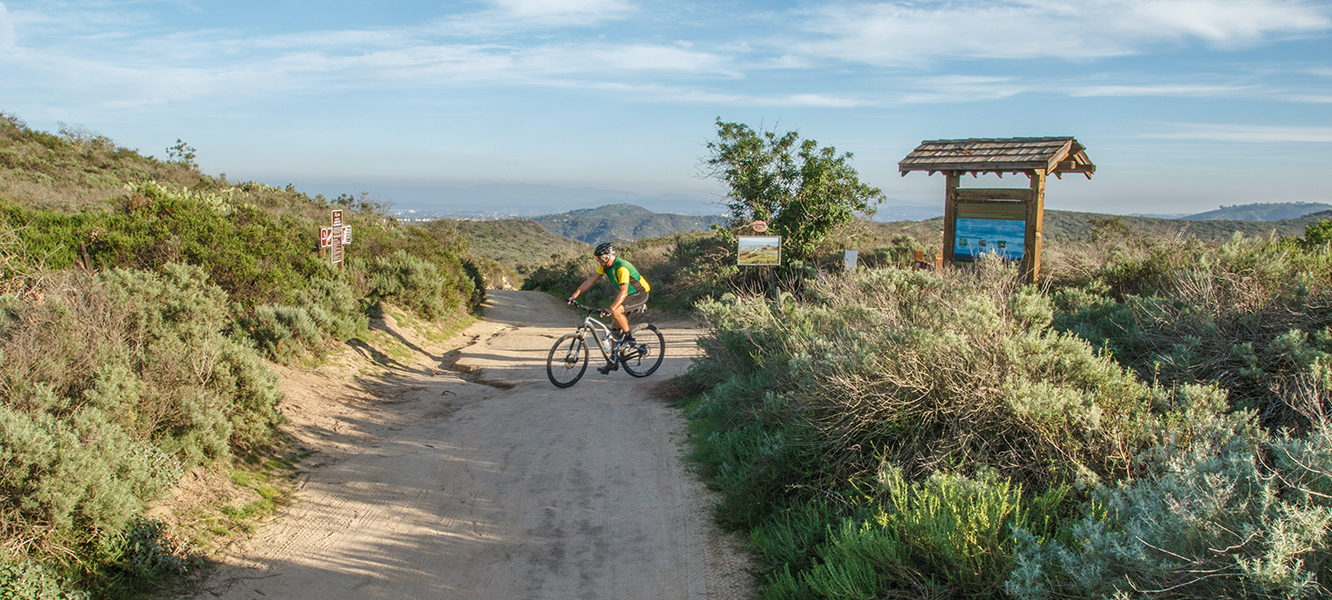
Laguna Coast Wilderness Park

Laguna Greenbelt, Inc. is a grassroots organization, founded in 1968 to preserve and protect the environment in and around Laguna Beach and Orange County. This non-profit works for the benefit of the general public informing, advocating and educating concerned citizens. With James Dilley as its founder, Laguna Greenbelt secures open space for the residents of Orange County and beyond. The Greenbelt believes, "that open space and wilderness areas along with wildlife habitat preservation are critical to the long-term health and well being of residents of southern California…We fought to preserve Laguna Canyon, Aliso and Woods Canyons and, the large swath of coastal hills known as the San Joaquin Hills. Much of our history has revolved around informing citizens, decision makers and stakeholders about the many benefits of open space preservation and protection…This work continues today with our initiative on the Irvine Regional Wildlife Corridor, an important wildlife habitat connection between the Laguna Greenbelt/South Coast Wilderness area and the Cleveland National Forest." Laguna Greenbelt also helped facilitate the formation of the Laguna Canyon Foundation.

== Laguna Canyon Foundation ==
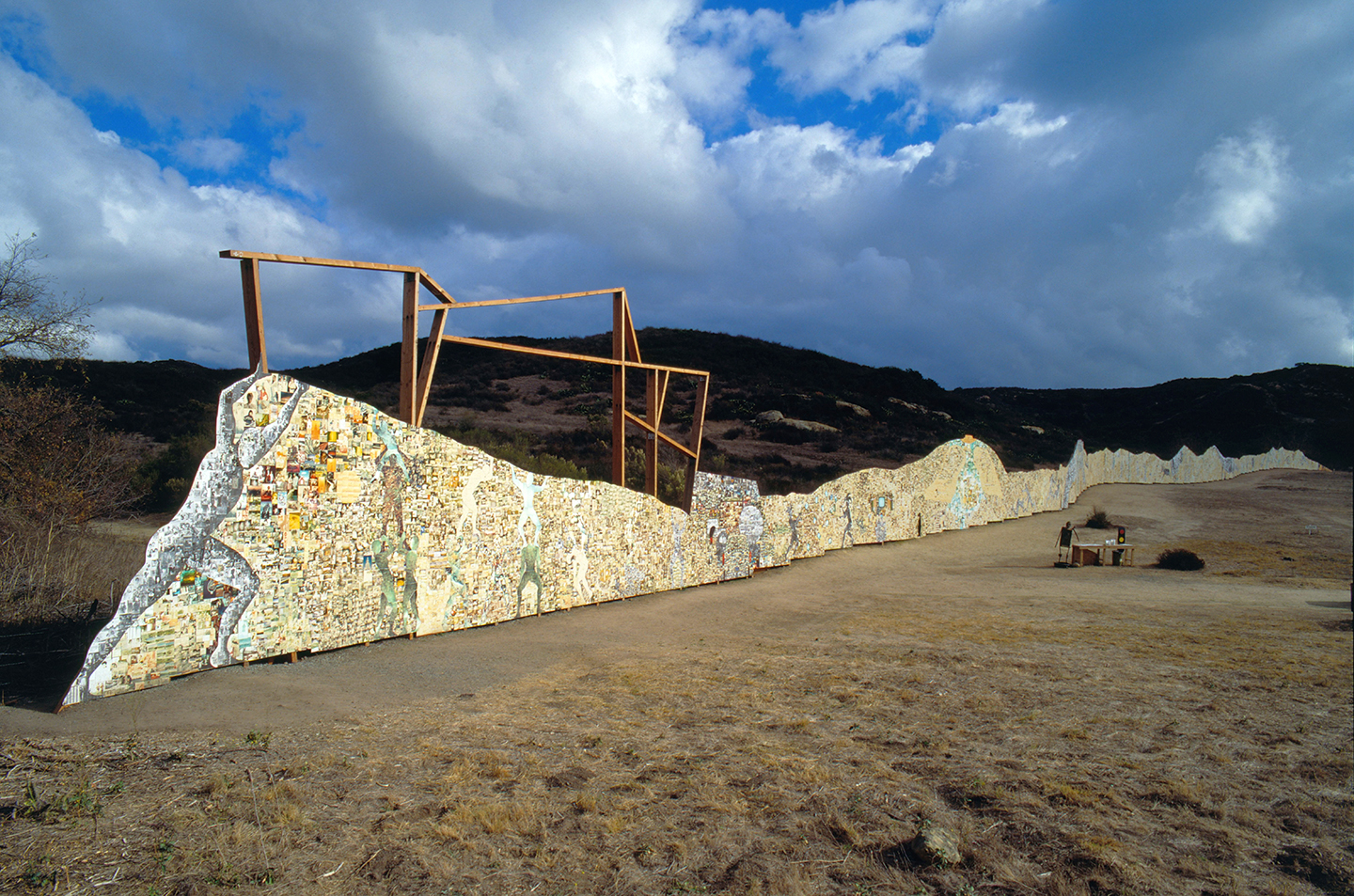
Final Days of The Tell 1990

In 1989, a photographic mural, The Tell, was created as part of the Laguna Canyon Project. In 1990, a bond measure was passed by Laguna Beach voters; which resulted in the Laguna Canyon Foundation being formed to manage preservation of Laguna Canyon. The Canyon Foundation purchased additional sections of open space that had been slated for development, and in 1993, established the Laguna Coast Wilderness Park. In 2014, Laguna native Hallie Jones was named executive director of the Laguna Canyon Foundation.

Laguna Canyon Foundation volunteers help Orange County Parks manage the coastal canyons. The James and Rosemary Nix Nature Center on Laguna Canyon Road in the Wilderness Park contributes to this effort by featuring exhibits, educational programs, guided hikes and other activities. In 2015, it was featured, along with other organizations, in Laguna Beach Eco Heroes, a 30-minute documentary by The My Hero Project. The efforts of the Crystal Cove Alliance, ECO-Warrior Foundation|ECO Warrior, Laguna Bluebelt, Nancy Caruso, One World One Ocean, Pacific Marine Mammal Center, Wyland, and Zero Trash Laguna were also highlighted in the documentary.

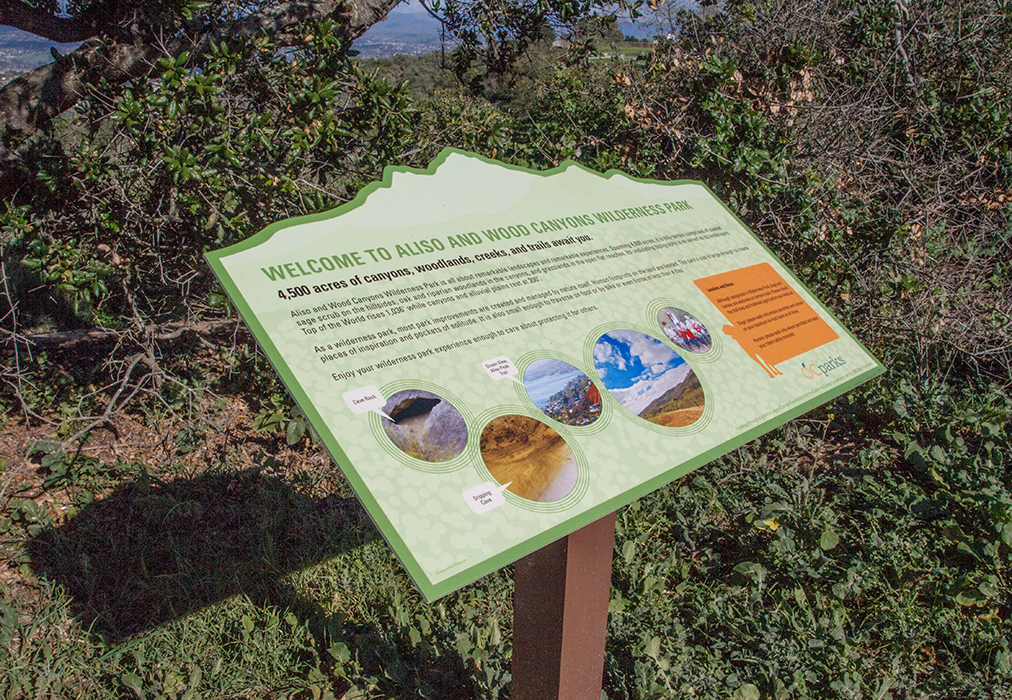
Aliso & Wood Canyons
