= Aliso =

Aliso (Spanish for "alder" or "sycamore") may refer to:

== Places ==
=== North Rhine-Westphalia, Germany ===
- Aliso (Roman camp), military and civilian colony in ancient Germany, built by the emperor Augustus

=== Sonora, Mexico ===
- Sierra El Aliso, a mountain range

=== California, United States ===
In California, aliso refers to Platanus racemosa, the Western sycamore.

==== Los Angeles County ====
- Aliso Creek (Los Angeles County), a major tributary of the Upper Los Angeles River
- Aliso Canyon Oil Field, an oil field and natural gas storage facility in the Santa Susana Mountains
- Aliso Village, a former housing project in Los Angeles
- Pico/Aliso station, a light rail station on the L Line and E Line of the Los Angeles Metro system

==== Orange County ====
- Aliso Creek (Orange County), an urban stream
  - Aliso Canyon, a canyon carved by the creek
    - Aliso and Wood Canyons Wilderness Park, a major regional park in the San Joaquin Hills
- Aliso Elementary School, a public elementary school
- Aliso Niguel High School, a public high school
- Aliso Viejo, California, a city
- Rancho Cañada de los Alisos, a Mexican land grant in present-day Orange County

=== Argentina ===
- Campo de los Alisos National Park

=== Ecuador ===
- Aliso (volcano), a.k.a. Pan de Azúcar

== France ==
- Aliso (river), a small coastal river in Corsica

== Other uses ==
- Aliso: A Journal of Systematic and Evolutionary Botany, a scientific journal on botany

== See also ==
- Alissos, Greece, a village
- Aliso Creek (disambiguation)
- Aliso Canyon (disambiguation)
