= Aliso Creek =

Aliso Creek may refer to:

- Aliso Creek (Orange County)
  - Aliso Canyon
- Aliso Creek (Los Angeles County), also called Aliso Canyon Wash

== See also ==
- Aliso (disambiguation)
- Aliso Canyon (disambiguation)
