= Wood Canyon Creek =

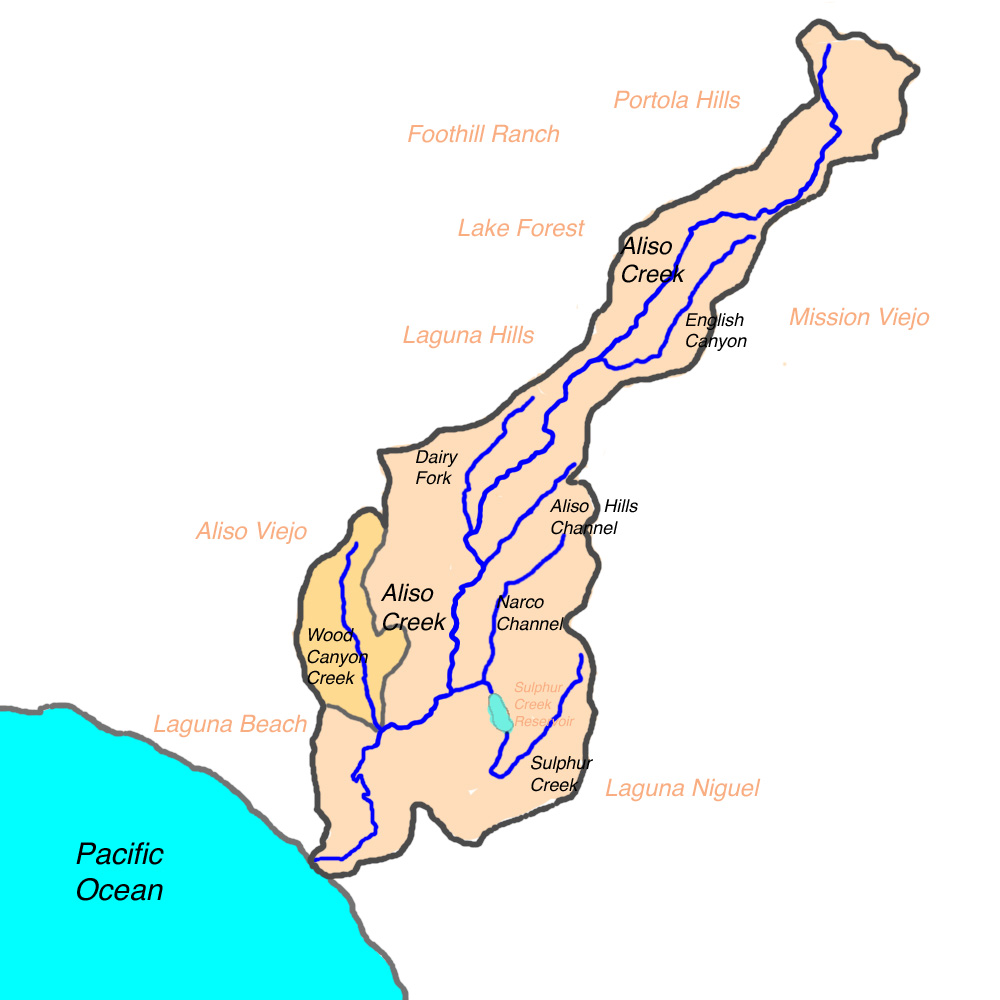
- Map of the Aliso Creek watershed with Wood Canyon Creek subwatershed highlighted

Location
- Country: United States

Physical characteristics
- Source
  - location: Wood Canyon Emergent Wetland
  - elevation: 600 ft (180 m)
- Mouth
  - location: Aliso Creek
  - coordinates: 33°32′28″N 117°44′14″W
  - elevation: 0 ft (0 m)
- Length: 2.8 mi (4.5 km)
- Discharge
  - average: Perennial

Wood Canyon Creek is a 2.8 mi (4.5 km) perennial stream in Aliso and Wood Canyons Wilderness Park, Orange County, California. A tributary of Aliso Creek, it drains a deep undeveloped valley to the west of Aliso Viejo.

The Wood Canyon was populated by the Acjachemen tribe hundreds of years ago; many archaeological sites along the creek provide evidence of their habitation. Spanish explorers and colonists arrived in the mid-18th century, establishing missions and a rancho that extended around the Aliso Creek watershed. Wood Canyon was used first as a cattle grazing area; after California became part of the United States, it was used to graze sheep. From the 1960s onward, the creek's flow has been heavily affected by urban runoff from suburban residential development.

The Wood Canyon watershed drains a portion of the San Joaquin Hills, a short coastal mountain range that uplifted beginning in the mid-Pleistocene (1.22 MYA).

== Course ==
The 2.8-mile (4.5 km) Wood Canyon Creek now begins slightly south of California State Route 73. The original headwaters have been filled in and piped under residential communities. The creek proper begins at a storm drain in Canyon View Park, Aliso Viejo and flows into an artificial wetland designed to control and treat the runoff. For its first 0.8 miles (1.3 km), the creek flows south through a narrow forested gorge. Further downstream the valley widens to form grasslands and meadows, where the remains of sheep corrals built in the 1800s can be found.

About halfway along its length the creek receives effluent from the Muirlands Storm Drain, then is joined by the intermittent Mathis Canyon Creek from the right. Flowing past Temple Hill, a 1,000-foot (300 m) peak of the San Joaquin Hills to the east, it crosses the Wood Canyon Trail three times. Several grouted riprap drop structures have been built here to protect the trail from stormwater erosion. It then passes under the Aliso Creek Trail through a series of culverts and cascades down into Aliso Creek.

== Watershed ==
The Wood Canyon subwatershed is contained entirely within the San Joaquin Hills, a small coastal mountain range that follows much of Orange County's Pacific coast. It is a long, narrow valley about 3 miles (4.8 km) long and 1.2 miles (1.9 km) wide, bounded by arid slopes 700 to 1,000 feet (210 to 300 m) high, and covering about 4 square miles (10 km^{2}). Nearly 80% of the Wood Canyon watershed forms the northern arm of Aliso Canyon. It is the second largest tributary of Aliso Creek, following Sulphur Creek.

Running nearly parallel to Laguna Canyon in the west for much of its length, Wood Canyon Creek is bounded on the east and north by the city of Aliso Viejo. Except for a few bordering portions, the watershed is relatively undeveloped. The Wood Canyon Trail, which is partially paved but mostly a wide dirt road, follows the creek for its entire length. The Dairy Fork subwatershed of Aliso Creek borders Wood Canyon Creek to the northeast.

Modified extensively by man-made runoff and erosion control measures, Wood Canyon Creek is referred to by the Watershed and Coastal Resources Division of Orange County as the Wood Canyon Channel. Some stretches of the creek are lined with riprap and there are three grouted riprap drop structures on the creek, each 3 to 5 feet (0.91 to 1.52 m) tall. The riparian zone surrounding the creek is one of the most prominent in the Aliso Creek watershed as a whole, although urban runoff has degraded its health.

== See also ==
- List of rivers of Orange County, California
