= Aliso Canyon (disambiguation) =

Aliso Canyon is a canyon located in Orange County, California in the United States.

Aliso Canyon may also refer to:

- Aliso Canyon Oil Field, Los Angeles County, California, USA
- Aliso and Wood Canyons Wilderness Park, Orange County, California, USA
- Rancho Cañada de los Alisos, a former land grant in what is now Orange County, California, USA
- Aliso Canyon Bridge, an unbuilt bridge in Porter Ranch, Los Angeles

== See also ==
- Aliso Canyon gas leak
- Aliso Creek (disambiguation)
- Aliso (disambiguation)
