= San Javier, Sonora =

Coordinates: 28°36′00″N 109°44′00″W

San Javier
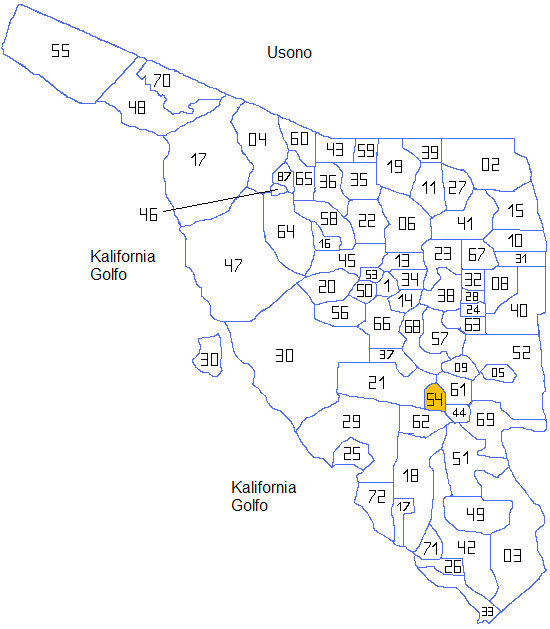
- Sonora locator map with San Javier village at 54
- Interactive map of San Javier
- Country: Mexico
- State: Sonora
- Municipality: San Javier
- Founded: 1706
- Time zone: UTC-7 (Pacific (US Mountain))

San Javier is a town in San Javier Municipality, in the Mexican state of Sonora. The elevation is 650 meters.

The municipality is located in the extreme southwest of the Sierra El Aliso, 25 kilometres (16 mi) west of the Yaqui River.
