= Aliso Creek (Orange County) =

Urban stream in California

Aliso Creek Alisos Creek, Los Alisos Creek
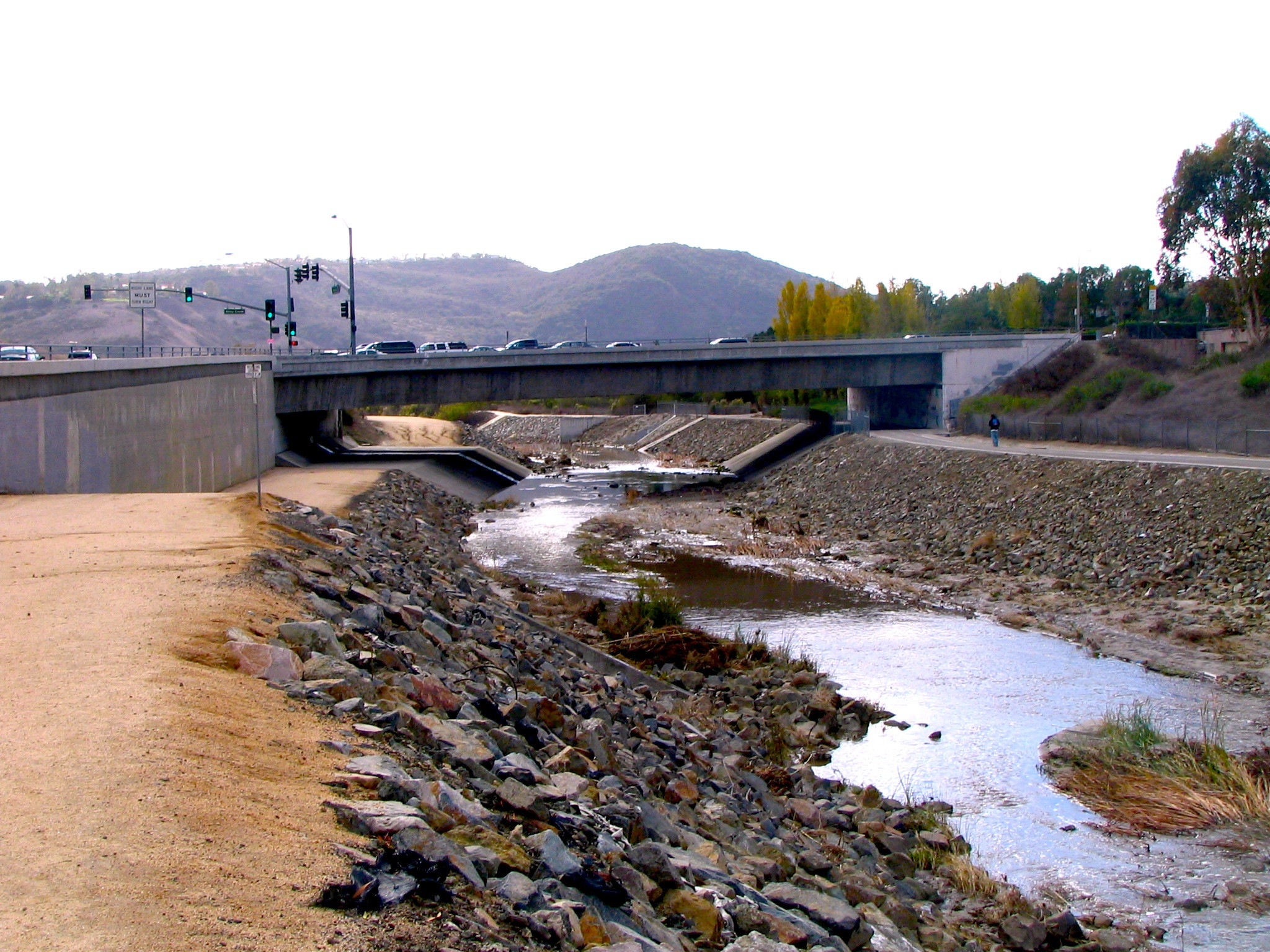
- Aliso Creek flows underneath the Aliso Creek Road bridge before it enters Aliso and Wood Canyons Wilderness Park.

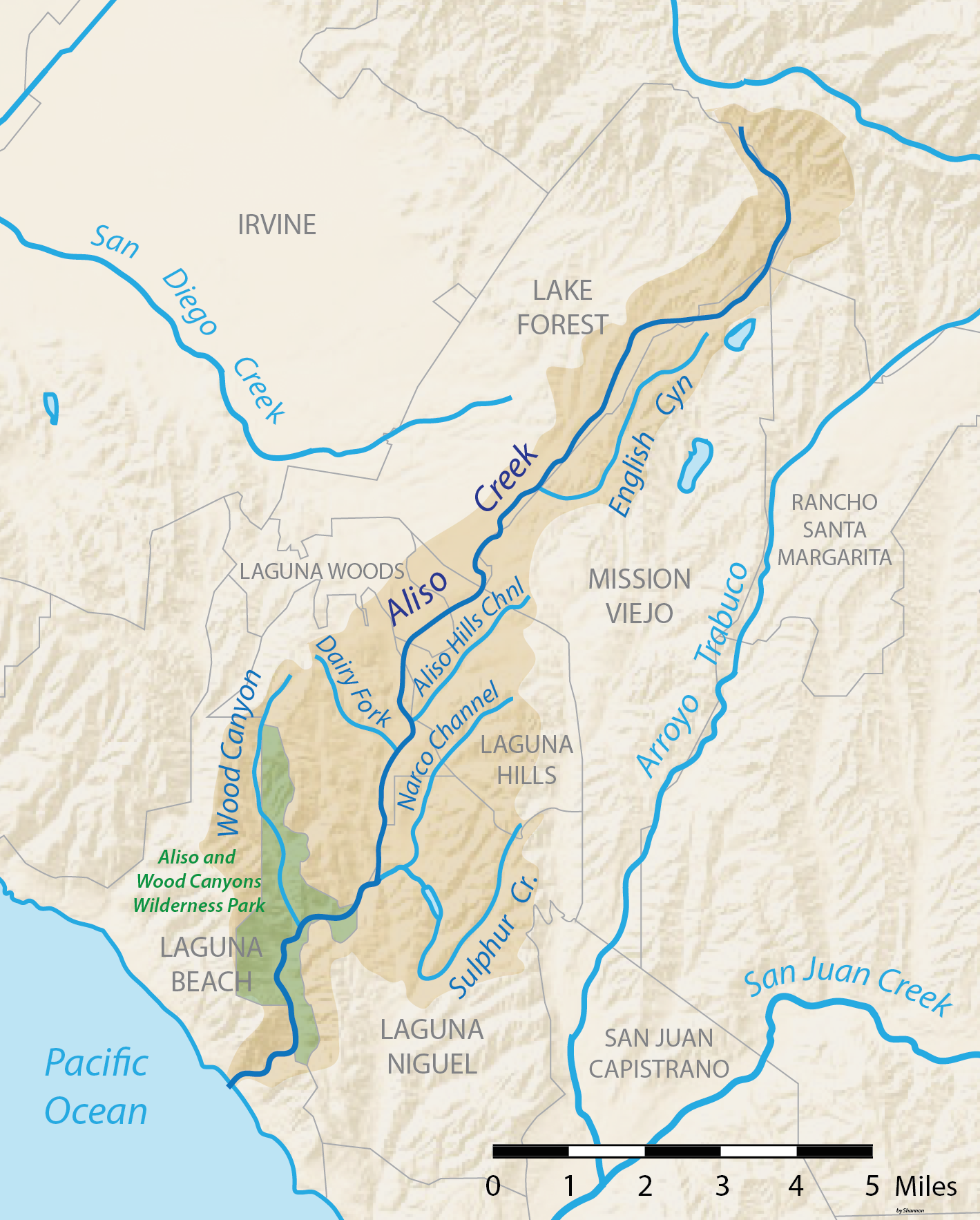
- Map of the Aliso Creek watershed showing major tributaries and cities

- Location of the mouth of Aliso Creek in California
- Etymology: Rancho Cañada de los Alisos land grant; "Aliso" means alder or sycamore in Spanish.

Location
- Country: United States
- State: California
- Counties: Orange County
- Cities: Laguna Beach, Laguna Niguel, Aliso Viejo, Laguna Woods, Laguna Hills, Lake Forest, Mission Viejo

Physical characteristics
- Source: Loma Ridge in the Santa Ana Mountains
  - location: Cleveland National Forest north of Portola Hills
  - coordinates: 33°42′10″N 117°37′20″W
  - elevation: 1,704 ft (519 m)
- Mouth: Pacific Ocean
  - location: Aliso Beach Park, Laguna Beach
  - coordinates: 33°30′38″N 117°45′9″W
  - elevation: 0 ft (0 m)
- Length: 19.8 mi (31.9 km)
- Basin size: 34.9 sq mi (90 km^{2})
- Discharge
  - location: Laguna Beach
  - average: 8 cu ft/s (0.23 m^{3}/s)
  - minimum: 0 cu ft/s (0 m^{3}/s)
  - maximum: 5,400 cu ft/s (150 m^{3}/s)

Basin features
- Tributaries
  - left: English Canyon Creek, Aliso Hills Channel, Sulphur Creek
  - right: Munger Creek, Dairy Fork, Wood Canyon Creek

Aliso Creek is a 19.8-mile (31.9 km)-long, mostly urban stream in south Orange County, California, United States. Originating in the Cleveland National Forest in the Santa Ana Mountains, it flows generally southwest and empties into the Pacific Ocean at Laguna Beach. The creek's watershed drains 34.9 square miles (90 km^{2}), and it is joined by seven main tributaries. As of 2018, the watershed had a population of 144,000 divided among seven incorporated cities.

Aliso Creek flows over highly erosive marine sedimentary rock of late Eocene to Pliocene age. What would become the Aliso Creek watershed originally lay at the bottom of the Pacific Ocean, before being uplifted as recently as 10 million years ago. About 1.2 million years ago, the San Joaquin Hills began to uplift in the path of Aliso Creek. Occasionally swollen by wetter climates during glacial periods, the creek carved the deep water gap known today as Aliso Canyon, the main feature of Aliso and Wood Canyons Wilderness Park.

Historically, Aliso Creek served as the boundary between the Acjachemem (Juaneño) and Tongva (Gabrieleño) Native Americans. Spanish explorers and missionaries reached the area in the 1700s and established Mission San Juan Capistrano, whose lands included part of the Aliso Creek watershed. In the 1840s the watershed was divided between several Mexican land grants. After California became part of the United States, the ranchos were gradually partitioned and sold off to farmers and settlers; starting in the 1950s, real estate companies acquired most of the land for development.

By the 21st century, more than 70 percent of the Aliso Creek watershed was urbanized. Most of the creek's course has been channelized or otherwise impacted by development. Pollution and erosion from urban runoff have become chronic issues. However, parts of the creek remain free flowing and provide important regional wildlife habitat, especially in the Aliso Canyon section. The creek has recently been the focus of projects to restore the stream channel and improve water quality.

== Etymology ==
The first recorded use of the name "Aliso" was for the Rancho Cañada de los Alisos Mexican land grant in 1841. The rancho area was renamed El Toro sometime before 1900, but the name "Aliso Creek" persisted. The word aliso means "alder" in Spanish, and refers to the riparian forests that historically occurred along the creek. The California sycamore, Platanus racemosa, is also known as aliso in Spanish, and is common in the area around the creek.

According to the U.S. Geological Survey's Geographic Names Information System, the creek has also been historically called "Los Alisos Creek" and "Alisos Creek". Several nearby geographical features also share the name, including the city of Aliso Viejo, Aliso Beach, Aliso Peak (a headland near the creek's mouth), Los Alisos Intermediate School in Mission Viejo, and Aliso Creek Road.

== Course ==
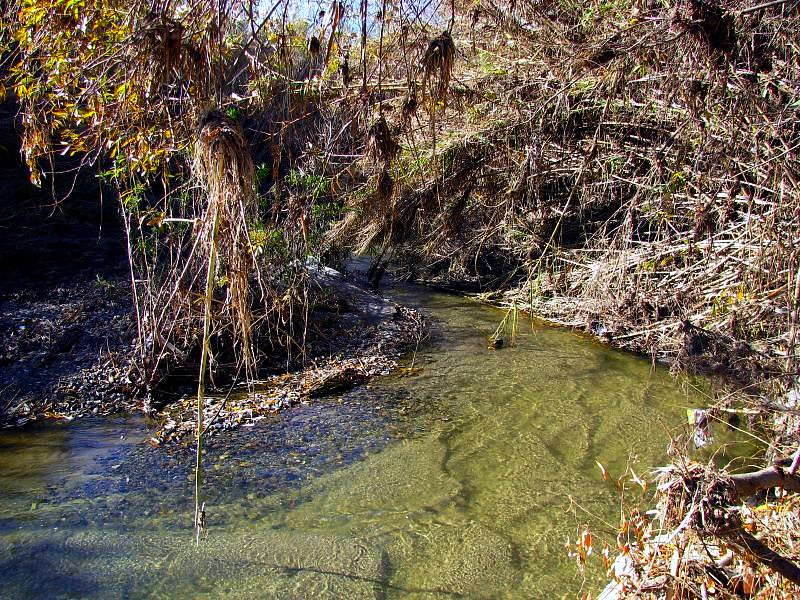
Aliso Creek near the headwaters

Aliso Creek rises along the Loma Ridge in the foothills of the Santa Ana Mountains, near the community of Portola Hills, Lake Forest. The creek's headwaters are at an elevation of 1,700 feet (520 m) in the Cleveland National Forest near Whiting Ranch Wilderness Park. The creek flows south along Country Home Road then begins to parallel Santiago Canyon Road, which becomes El Toro Road south of Cook's Corner. The creek enters Mission Viejo, flowing freely in a natural streambed along the bottom of a brushy, shaded ravine. It turns southwest, crossing under the 241 toll road and passing Saddleback Church, then receives an unnamed tributary from the right. The creek then enters Lake Forest, where it receives Munger Creek from the right and English Canyon Creek from the left.

Below English Canyon, Aliso Creek flows in a concrete channel through Heroes Park and then reverts to a natural channel once again in El Toro Park. Past Muirlands Boulevard the creek flows in a concrete channel, making a sharp turn to the southeast before veering back south towards Interstate 5. Downstream of the freeway Aliso Creek flows through Laguna Hills then through Aliso Park in the retirement community of Laguna Woods Village. It enters Aliso Viejo at the Moulton Parkway bridge near Sheep Hills Park. Below this point the valley widens at the northernmost tip of Aliso and Wood Canyons Wilderness Park, the beginning of a greenbelt that stretches from here nearly to the Pacific Ocean.

Soon after entering the park, Aliso Creek is joined by the Dairy Fork from the right then the Aliso Hills Channel from the left, before passing under the 73 toll road. Below this point, the creek flows past Journey School, Aliso Niguel High School and Wood Canyon Elementary School as well as the Laguna Niguel Skate and Soccer Park, where it skirts the northwestern part of Laguna Niguel. Below Aliso Creek Road it is joined from the east by its largest tributary, Sulphur Creek. Sulphur Creek drains much of northern Laguna Niguel and is dammed to form Laguna Niguel Lake, the main feature of Laguna Niguel Regional Park.

From there, Aliso Creek turns west and enters Aliso Canyon, a nearly 1,000-foot (300 m) deep gorge which cuts through the San Joaquin Hills approaching the Pacific. About a mile (1.6 km) below Sulphur Creek, Aliso Creek is impounded at a small concrete dam. It then receives its second largest tributary, Wood Canyon Creek, to the south of Soka University of America. Below Wood Canyon it turns south, winding through the wilderness park then turning west at the South Orange County Wastewater Agency (SOCWA)'s Coastal Treatment Plant. It then flows through the former Aliso Creek Inn and Golf Course (now The Ranch at Laguna Beach), under Pacific Coast Highway, and empties into the sea at Aliso Beach in Laguna Beach.

Aliso Creek forms a narrow tidal lagoon just above its mouth at Aliso Beach. The lagoon originally covered a large area at the outlet of Aliso Canyon, dammed by a sandbar that only breached during the rainy season. Due to development of the golf course and parking lots at the mouth of the creek, the lagoon has been significantly reduced from its original size. The increased freshwater inflow caused by urban runoff has further disrupted the hydrologic regime of the lagoon, which occasionally breaches, causing large surge flows into the Pacific Ocean before the sandbar re-forms.

== Hydrology ==
Aliso Creek empties into a sandy lagoon at its mouth in Laguna Beach. Due to tides and erosion, its mouth is ever-changing.

Aliso Creek was historically a seasonal stream with a few sections containing water year round, including the headwaters and lower Aliso Canyon. Significant flow only occurred in the rainy months of November through March. As recently as 1982, the creek was observed to be dry in the summer. As of 2012, urban runoff contributed a dry season flow of 5 million gallons (20,000 m^{3}) per day, or approximately 8 cubic feet per second (0.23 m^{3}/s), at the creek's mouth. Urban runoff accounts for at least 80 percent of the creek's dry season flow.

The United States Geological Survey operated a stream gage on the creek at the El Toro Road bridge in Mission Viejo from 1930 to 1980. This gage measured runoff from 7.91 square miles (20.49 km^{2}), or 26 percent of the watershed area. There was also a gauge in Laguna Beach which measured runoff from the entire watershed, but it operated only from 1982 to 1987.

The average annual flow at El Toro was 0.92 cubic feet per second (0.026 m^{3}/s), ranging from 4.7 cubic feet per second (0.13 m^{3}/s) in February to 0.05 cubic feet per second (0.0014 m^{3}/s) in July. The highest peak flow was 2,500 cubic feet per second (71 m^{3}/s) on February 24, 1969. At the Laguna Beach gage, the average annual flow was 19.2 cubic feet per second (0.54 m^{3}/s), with a high of 50 cubic feet per second (1.4 m^{3}/s) in March and a low of 4.5 cubic feet per second (0.13 m^{3}/s) in June. The largest flow recorded at the Laguna Beach gauge was 5,400 cubic feet per second (150 m^{3}/s) during the El Niño event on March 1, 1983.

Urbanization is the main cause of increased winter flooding, due to the covering of land with impervious surfaces. From 1931 to 1960, the average annual peak flow at the El Toro gauge was 511 cubic feet per second (14.5 m^{3}/s), and between 1960 and 1980, the average peak flow was 1,178 cubic feet per second (33.4 m^{3}/s).

== Watershed ==
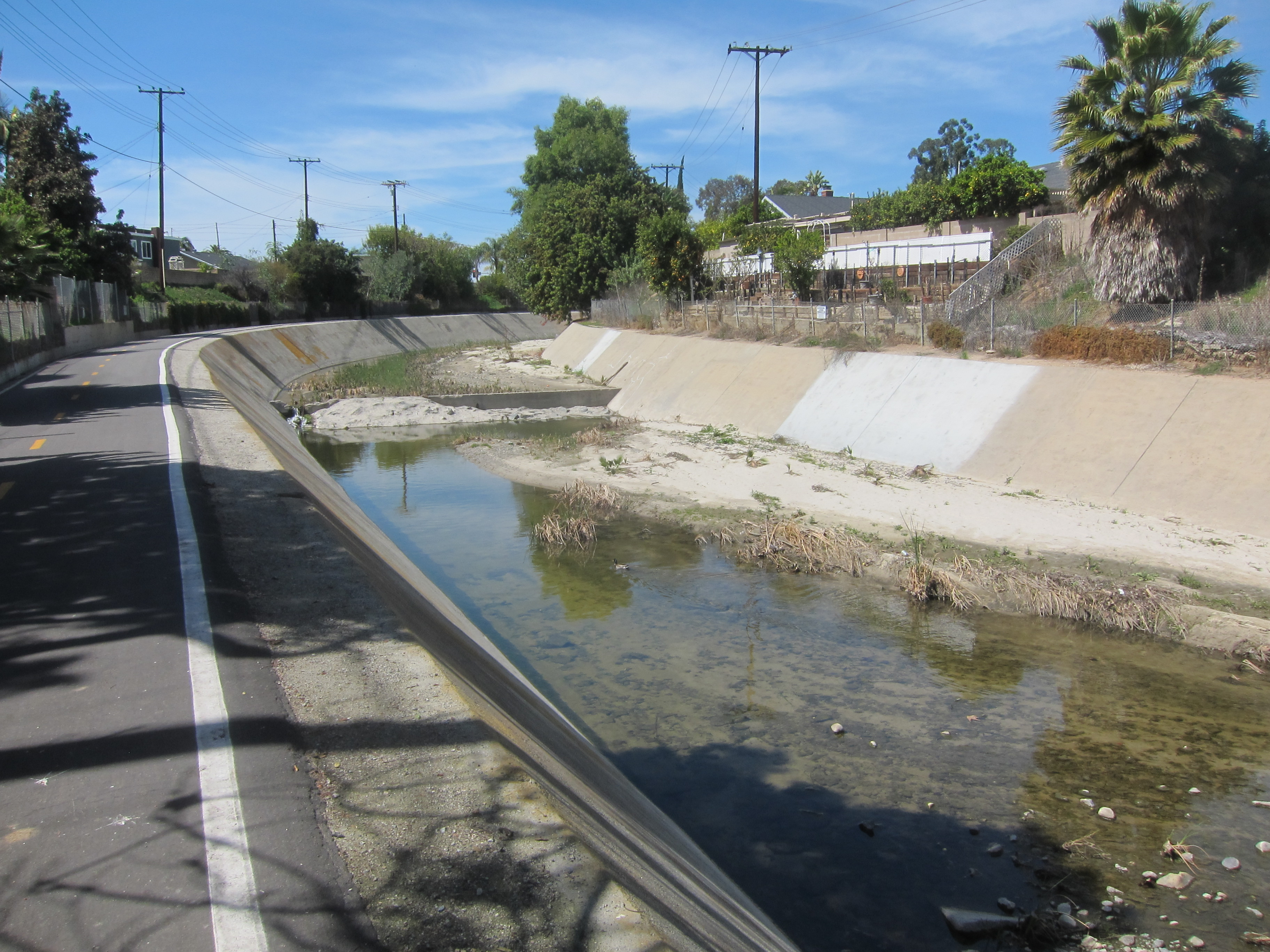
A channelized section of Aliso Creek in Lake Forest

The Aliso Creek drainage basin lies in the south central part of Orange County, roughly halfway between the Santa Ana River and the border of San Diego County. It is an elongated area of 34.9 square miles (90 km^{2}), ranging from about a mile (1.6 km) in width in the north to 5 miles (8.0 km) wide in the south. The watershed is characterized by rolling hills, with very little flat land except in the alluvial valleys along Aliso Creek. The portion of the Santa Ana Mountains in the Aliso Creek watershed top out at approximately 2,300 feet (700 m), while the San Joaquin Hills rise to 1,020 feet (310 m) at Temple Hill, locally called "Top of the World", in Laguna Beach west of Aliso Canyon. Aside from 44-acre (18 ha) Laguna Niguel Lake, an impoundment of the Sulphur Creek tributary, there are no major bodies of fresh water.

The watershed experiences a dry Mediterranean climate. As of 2001, the average annual precipitation in the San Juan Hydrological Unit, which Aliso Creek is part of, was 16.42 inches (417 mm). The watershed borders five major Orange County watersheds: Santiago Creek to the north, San Diego Creek to the west, Laguna Canyon to the southwest, Salt Creek to the southeast, and San Juan Creek to the east.

As of 2018, the Aliso Creek watershed had a population of 144,000 divided among seven incorporated cities, or a population density of 4,100 persons per square mile (1,600 persons per km^{2}). Nine communities were established in the creek's watershed as it was developed in the 20th century. By 2001 seven of them had become cities (from mouth to source, Laguna Beach, Laguna Niguel, Aliso Viejo, Laguna Hills, Laguna Woods, Lake Forest (formerly El Toro), and Mission Viejo), and the last two, Foothill Ranch and Portola Hills, were incorporated into the city of Lake Forest in 2000.

The largest land use in the watershed is residential, which as of 2009 accounted for 39.6 percent of the total area. Other urban land uses are commercial (10.7 percent), miscellaneous (4.9 percent), agriculture (3.7 percent) and industrial (1.6 percent). Public lands, including national forest and county parks, comprised 26.4 percent of the watershed, and another 13.1 percent was unincorporated. Much of the terrain in the watershed has been regraded to build homes and roads, and a number of smaller tributaries such as Munger Creek have been completely filled in.

=== Crossings ===
Crossings of the creek are listed from mouth to source (year built in parentheses). The creek is crossed by roughly 30 major bridges.

- SR 1 - Pacific Coast Highway (1926)
- Six footbridges in the Aliso Creek Golf Course
- SOCWA Coastal Treatment Plant access road
- Service Road for ACWHEP Dam
- AWMA (Aliso Water Management Agency) Road
- Aliso Creek Road (1988)
- Pacific Park Drive
- SR 73 Toll - San Joaquin Hills Transportation Corridor (twin bridges, 1996)
- Aliso Creek Trail
- Moulton Parkway (northbound 1969, southbound 1987)
- Laguna Hills Drive—twin bridges (1985)
- Avenida Sevilla
- Two footbridges in Aliso Park
- Paseo de Valencia (1966)
- Aliso Creek Trail
- I-5 - San Diego Freeway (1959)
- Aliso Creek Trail
- Los Alisos Boulevard (1973)
- Muirlands Boulevard (1973)
- Private road in Lake Forest Golf Center
- Surf Line (railroad bridge)
- Jeronimo Road (1974)
- Aliso Creek Trail/2nd Street pedestrian bridge
- Aliso Creek Trail
- Trabuco Road—twin bridges (1975)
- Creekside Drive (1980)
- CR S18 - El Toro Road (1975)
- Normandale Drive (1987)
- Portola Parkway
- Saddleback Parkway
- SR 241 Toll - Foothill Transportation Corridor (twin bridges, 1995)
- Aliso Creek Trail
- Aliso Creek Trail
- Glenn Ranch Road
- Aliso Creek Trail
- CR S18 - El Toro Road
- CR S18 - El Toro Road
- CR S18 - Santiago Canyon Road
- Crystal Canyon Road
- Country Home Road

=== Tributaries ===
From mouth to source, Aliso Creek is joined by seven major tributaries. Another forty-six minor streams and drains flow into the creek.

Name	Source	Source coordinates	Mouth	Mouth coordinates	Length
Wood Canyon Creek	Canyon View Park, Aliso Viejo	33°34′57″N 117°44′43″W	Aliso and Wood Canyons Wilderness Park south of Aliso Viejo	33°32′28″N 117°44′13″W	3.86 mi (6.21 km)
Sulphur Creek	Near Greenfield Drive and CA 73 in Laguna Niguel	33°33′39″N 117°41′03″W	Near Alicia Parkway and Aliso Creek Road in Laguna Niguel	33°33′02″N 117°43′07″W	4.77 mi (7.68 km)
Aliso Hills Channel	Near Alicia Parkway and Muirlands Blvd in Mission Viejo	33°36′24″N 117°41′01″W	Near Alicia Parkway and Moulton Parkway in Laguna Hills	33°34′49″N 117°42′34″W	2.79 mi (4.49 km)
Dairy Fork	Near El Toro Road and Muirlands Blvd in Lake Forest	33°37′13″N 117°41′54″W	Creekside Park, Aliso Viejo	33°35′20″N 117°42′50″W	2.72 mi (4.38 km)
English Canyon Creek	Near Trabuco Hills High School, Mission Viejo	33°39′27″N 117°38′19″W	Near Los Alisos Blvd and Jeronimo Road in Mission Viejo	33°37′44″N 117°40′53″W	3.57 mi (5.75 km)
Munger Creek	Regency Park, Lake Forest	33°39′37″N 117°39′42″W	Near El Toro Road and Trabuco Road in Lake Forest	33°38′00″N 117°40′37″W	2.40 mi (3.86 km)
Glass Creek	Portola Hills, Lake Forest	33°41′04″N 117°37′51″W	Near El Toro Road and Portola Parkway in Lake Forest	33°39′34″N 117°39′22″W	2.44 mi (3.93 km)

== Geology ==
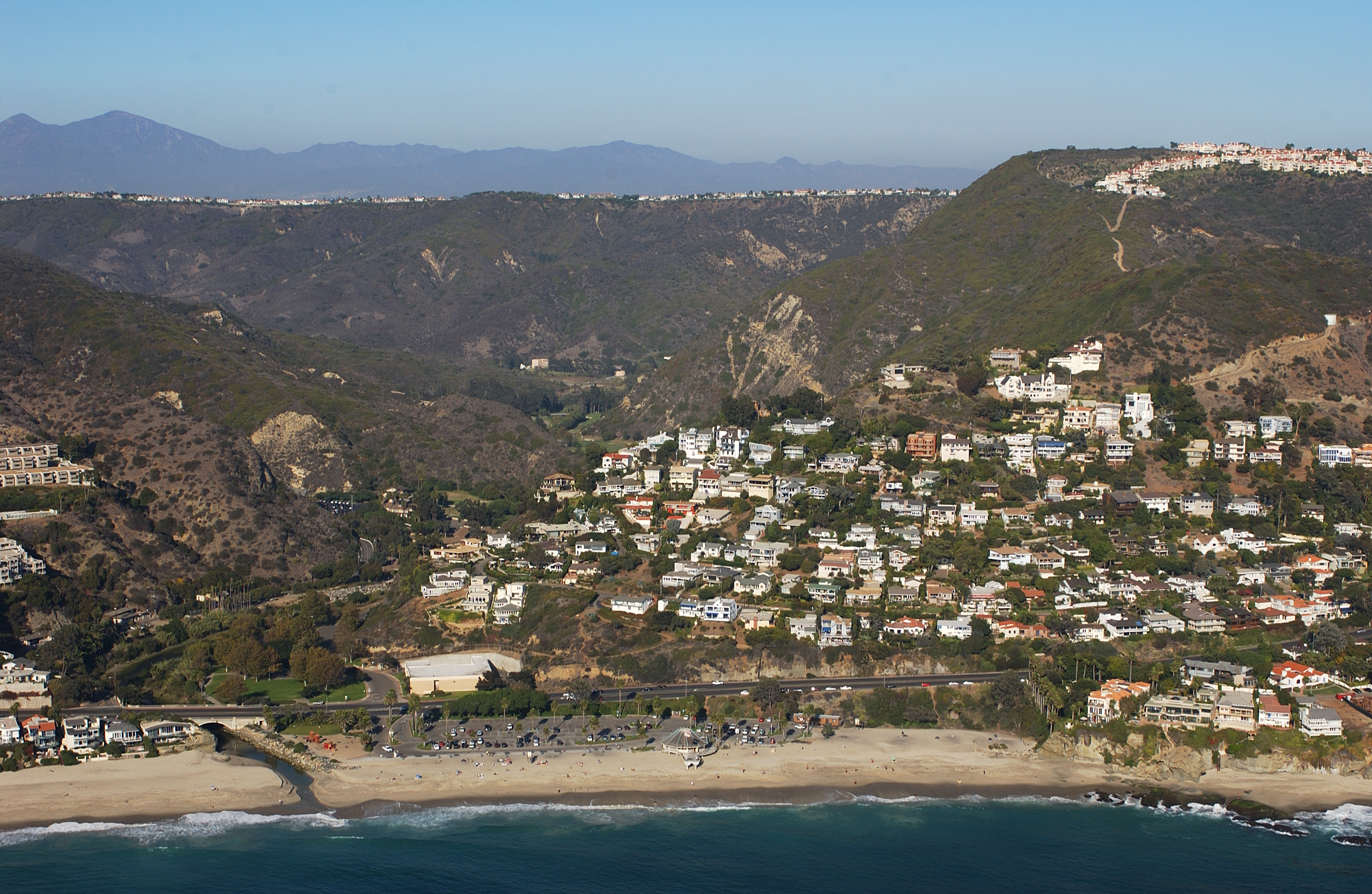
Aerial view of the mouth of Aliso Creek, Aliso Beach is in foreground, Aliso Canyon behind. The Pacific Coast Highway crosses the creek just above its mouth.

Most of Southern California, including all of Orange County, was part of the Pacific Ocean until about 10 million years ago (MYA) when regional uplift began. The Santa Ana Mountains, where the creek originates, began to rise about 5.5 million years ago along the Elsinore Fault. Most of the Aliso Creek watershed sits on several layers of marine sedimentary strata, the oldest dating from the Eocene (55.8–33.9 MYA) and the most recent, the Pliocene (5.33–2.59 MYA). These alluvial sediments range from 13 to 36 feet (4.0 to 11.0 m) in depth. The watershed includes outcrops of the Topanga Formation, Monterey Formation, San Onofre Breccia, Capistrano Formation and Niguel Formation. Generally throughout the watershed, there are five major soil and rock outcrop types—Capistrano sandy loam, Cieneba sandy loam, Marina loamy sand, Myford sandy loam, and Cieneba-rock outcrop. The water table ranges from 6 to 20 feet (1.8 to 6.1 m) deep.

About 1.22 million years ago, the San Joaquin Hills along the Orange County coast began their uplift along the San Joaquin Hills blind thrust fault which extends south from the Los Angeles Basin. The hills rose directly in the path of Aliso Creek, which cut a water gap through the range, forming Aliso Canyon. The uplift also diverted Sulphur Creek, which originally flowed south into Salt Creek, to turn north and join Aliso Creek.

During the last glacial period (110,000 to 10,000 years ago), especially in the Wisconsinian glaciation (31,000 to 10,000 years ago), the climate of Southern California became periodically much wetter, with a climate similar to the present-day Pacific Northwest. At these times Aliso Creek was a river carrying much more water than it does today. During glacial periods sea level was as much as 400 feet (120 m) lower, increasing the stream gradient and thus its erosive force. These factors led to Aliso Creek carving out a much larger series of valleys than would appear possible with its present-day volume. As sea levels rose after the Wisconsinian glaciation, Aliso Canyon became a long narrow bay. Over thousands of years Aliso Creek filled in the bay with sediment, creating the flat alluvial valley floor seen today, while the creek itself remains as an underfit stream.

== Ecology ==
=== Plants ===
Before urbanization of the watershed, Aliso Creek and some of its tributaries supported a significant riparian zone dominated by native hardwoods such as coast live oak, sycamore, alder, cottonwood and arroyo willow. Many of the trees in Aliso Creek's riparian zone, especially near the mouth of the creek, were cut down in the Spanish Mission period to construct colonial settlements. During the early 20th century, groundwater withdrawal for agriculture killed off many of the remaining trees along the creek. The most significant remaining riparian habitat today occurs in Aliso and Wood Canyons, and along the uppermost headwaters of Aliso Creek.

Increased erosion and pollution caused by urban runoff have had adverse impacts on the riparian zone. Invasive plants, including tobacco tree, castor bean, pampas grass, periwinkle, and artichoke thistle, but most notably the giant reed, have in many places replaced native trees. Giant reed was originally planted in the 1970s to control erosion. These invasive species are most prevalent along upper Sulphur Creek, the lower half of Aliso Creek, and Wood Canyon Creek.

The hilly terrain of the watershed supports mostly grassland and coastal scrub vegetation. Native shrub species present in the watershed include California brittlebush, California buckwheat, California sagebrush, California goldenbush, coyote brush and mule fat. Like the riparian zones, native grassland and shrublands have been heavily impacted by invasive species. A 2009 survey conducted in the Aliso Creek watershed found non-native grass coverage of between 66 and 100 percent, and non-native shrub coverage of between 0 and 50 percent, across fourteen sample sites.

=== Animals ===
Mountain lions, bobcats, mule deer, gray fox and other large mammals once ranged throughout the Aliso Creek watershed; today, they are mostly confined to the wilderness reserves in the Santa Ana Mountains (Cleveland National Forest) and San Joaquin Hills (Aliso/Wood Canyons, Laguna Coast Wilderness). Most large mammal populations in the Aliso/Wood Canyons area are considered at risk of extirpation by the 2040s, in the absence of extensive habitat restoration. Mountain lions have already disappeared from Aliso/Wood Canyons. Although most of the creek channel is tightly bound by urban development, it is considered a potential wildlife corridor between these two areas. The U.S. Army Corps of Engineers describes the corridor as "meager at best with several places where Aliso Creek is very narrow, concrete, or incorporates golf courses parks and school grounds."

The watershed supports multiple native bird species, including California least tern, least Bell's vireo, southwestern willow flycatcher, California gnatcatcher, and western snowy plover. The loss of riparian zones has reduced bird habitat in the watershed. These species are mostly found in undeveloped areas of Aliso and Wood Canyons, the upper reaches of Aliso Creek, and some parts of English Canyon Creek. Aliso Canyon is one of the most diverse bird habitats in Orange County, with some 122 nesting and migratory species found there. The canyon also has raptors including northern harrier, Cooper's hawk, golden eagle and peregrine falcon.

The creek has several species of amphibians and reptiles. Species of concern listed by the state of California include the Coastal Range newt, orange-throated whiptail, coastal western whiptail, coast horned lizard, California legless lizard, and two-striped garter snake. Native frogs and the arroyo toad once inhabited the creek, but they were extirpated by damage to the channel following floods in 1983. Non-native bullfrogs have been introduced to parts of the creek. The threatened southwestern pond turtle, the only indigenous turtle species to Orange County, is also found in the creek.

=== Fish and amphibians ===
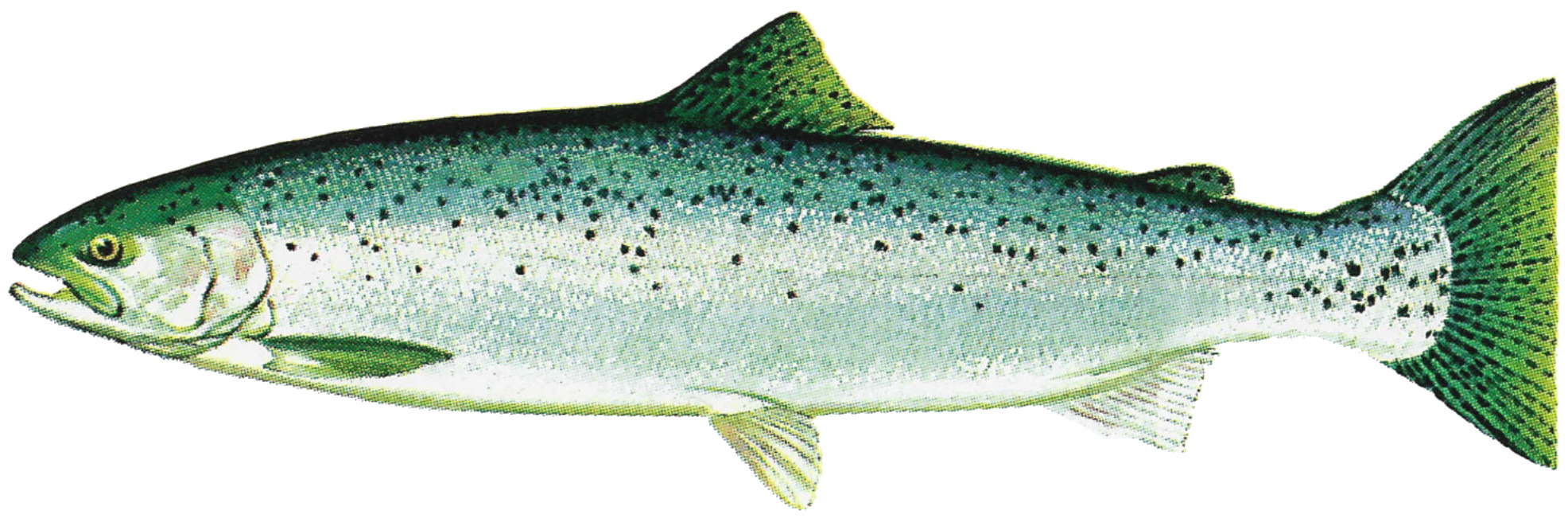
Steelhead trout existed in Aliso Creek and likely inhabited the creek within recorded history, as recently as 1972.

Although many fish species were once found in Aliso Creek, the only remaining one is the introduced common carp, which can tolerate the low oxygen levels and high temperatures typical of the creek water. Aside from carp, several other native and introduced fish species were found in the creek until the 1980s, including mosquito fish, bluegill, bass, and channel catfish. After flooding exacerbated by urban runoff destroyed much of the remaining riparian habitat, these species were reported to have disappeared from the area.

The historical presence of endangered steelhead trout (Oncorhynchus mykiss) in Aliso Creek has been debated. Until 2006 the National Marine Fisheries Service (NMFS) stated that there was "no evidence of historical or extant of O. mykiss in anadromous waters" in Aliso Creek. However, a 1998 study co-authored by the U.S. Army Corps of Engineers and US Fish & Wildlife Service declared that steelhead had inhabited the creek until the 1970s, when increased urbanization resulted in poor water quality conditions (pollution and low oxygen levels) that drove the migrational fish out.

In 2009, after years of petitioning from local residents and environmental groups including Friends of the Aliso Creek Steelhead and Clean Water Now, the NMFS recognized the lower 7 miles (11 km) of Aliso Creek as former steelhead habitat and the creek was added to the Distinct Population Segment List under the jurisdictional domain of NOAA. It is now considered a candidate for re-colonization. The evidence cited included Native American (Acjachemen) accounts of takings, as well as anglers who reported taking steelhead trout in the 1960s and 1970s from Aliso Creek's estuary and Aliso Canyon before suburban development began. The last reported observation of steelhead in Aliso Creek was in 1972.

In the 1970s, a large population of the threatened tidewater goby (10,000–15,000) was documented in the Aliso Creek estuary. The species has declined significantly since then due to pollution and reduction of its habitat. In 2011 the U.S. Fish and Wildlife Service designated the Aliso Creek estuary and several other coastal Southern California streams as critical habitat for the tidewater goby.

== History ==
=== First inhabitants ===
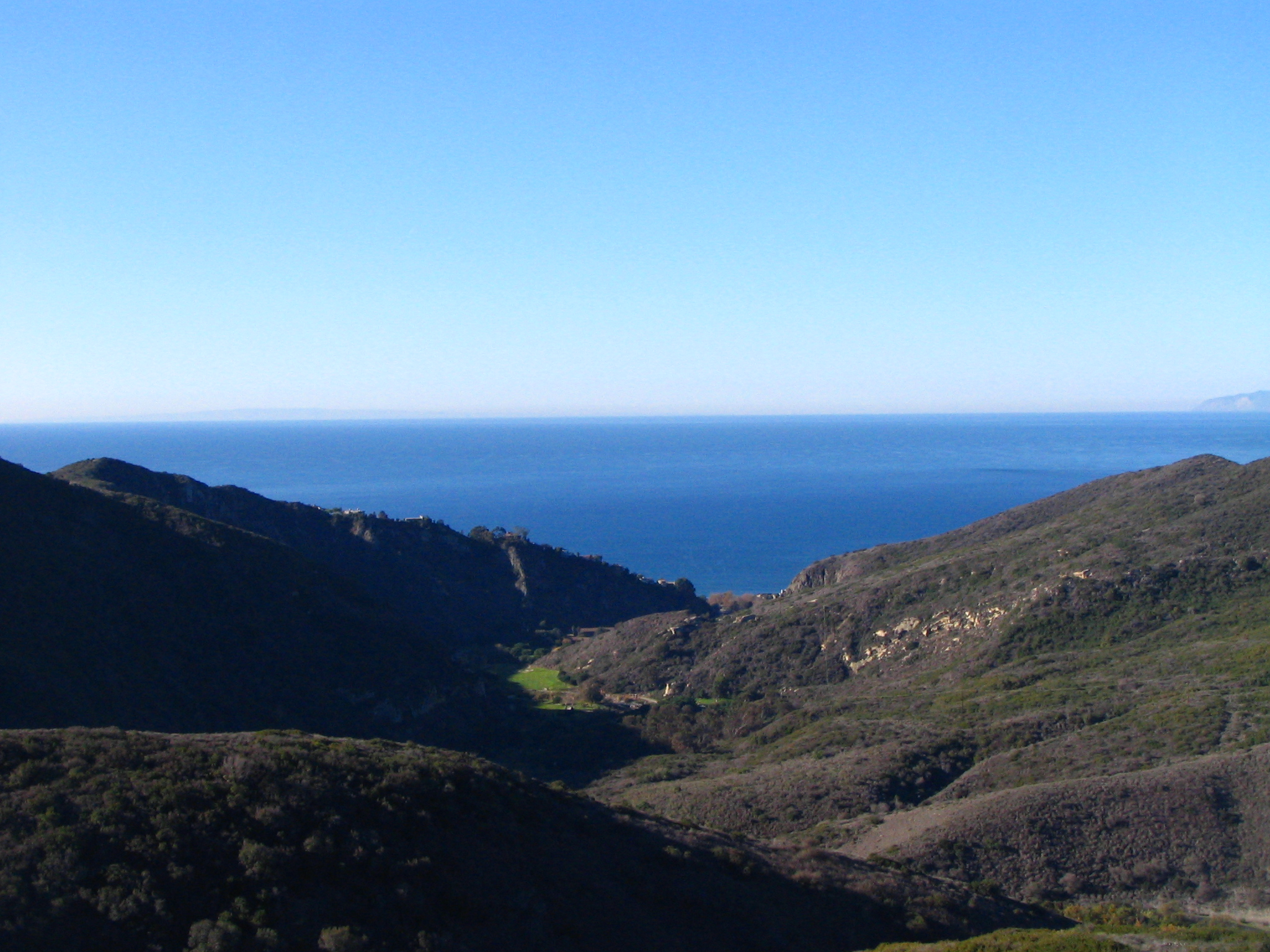
Aliso Canyon once formed part of the boundary between Acjachemen and Tongva lands.

Aliso Creek historically served as a boundary between the Tongva Native Americans in the north, and the Acjachemen (sometimes grouped with the larger Payómkawichum) in the south. The Tongva's territory extended north, past the Santa Ana River and San Gabriel River, into present-day Los Angeles County, while the Acjachemen's smaller territory extended from Aliso Creek south, past San Juan Creek, and to the vicinity of San Mateo Creek in present-day San Diego County. The availability of perennial water in some parts of the creek made it an attractive location for Native Americans to camp, hunt, gather and fish. The numerous oak groves along the creek provided an abundant supply of acorns, a staple of their diet. About 70 archaeological sites have been discovered along the creek, with 33 on the northwest side and 47 on the southeast side. An Acjachemen village situated near the confluence of Aliso Creek and Sulphur Creek was named Niguili, possibly meaning "a large spring" in the Luiseño language.

The placement of the tribal boundary at Aliso Creek has been disputed, as the usual practice among indigenous peoples of this region was to claim watershed divides rather than stream channels as boundaries. Constance Cameron challenged this view in the paper Aliso Creek: The Great Divide? (1974) presented to the Southern California Academy of Sciences, arguing that the boundary lay north of Aliso Creek and that the entire stream lay within Acjachemen land. D. Earle (1992) further stated that "There is some evidence... that Gabrielino (Tongva) territory may have extended only as far south as the Tustin Plain" (a location about 10 miles (16 km) north of Aliso Creek). This contradicts the generally accepted theory originated by Alfred L. Kroeber (1925) who stated that "Juaneño (Acjachemen) place names do not extend north of Aliso Creek". The Master Key (1956) by Bernice Eastman Johnson and The First Angelinos (1996) by W. McCawley also place the boundary at Aliso Creek.

=== Spanish exploration and colonization ===
On July 24, 1769, the Spanish Portolà expedition led by Gaspar de Portolá, traveling north from San Diego, reached a stream which Fray Joan Crespí described as "Alisos Creek", which was actually the Arroyo Trabuco. They camped there for two days before continuing on and crossing what is now known as Aliso Creek, where they found wild grapes and roses in abundance, on July 26. Crespí wrote in his diary, "So we went on over very open country, with hills and broad mesas, ascending and descending through three or four little valleys of good soil well grown with alders." He also wrote of the local Acjachemen people: "They came without arms and with a friendliness unequaled; they made us presents of their poor seeds and we made return with ribbons and gew-gaws."

These first explorers were soon followed by Franciscan missionaries who established Mission San Juan Capistrano in 1776 near the main population center of the Acjachemen people, on San Juan Creek about 5 miles (8.0 km) east of the mouth of Aliso Creek. The Spanish referred to the Acjachemen as the Juaneño, and to the Tongva as the Gabrielino, after the further away Mission San Gabriel Arcángel. The Aliso Creek watershed was part of the vast land holdings of Mission San Juan Capistrano. The El Camino Real ("King's Highway"), connecting the coastal missions in California, crossed Aliso Creek in the vicinity of El Toro (today's Lake Forest). The Spanish established Rancheria Niguel in what is now the city of Aliso Viejo and grazed their cattle there. Most of the Native Americans were relocated to the mission where they were forced into agricultural labor and converted to Spanish Catholicism.

In order to provide timber for Spanish settlements, most of the riparian forests around Aliso Creek were heavily logged. It was said that the trees near the mouth of Aliso Canyon were especially tall and there were accounts of Spanish ships mooring in the large bay at the outlet of Aliso Canyon and men going ashore to chop down and take away these trees for constructing mission buildings, ships and other structures.

=== Mexican land grants ===
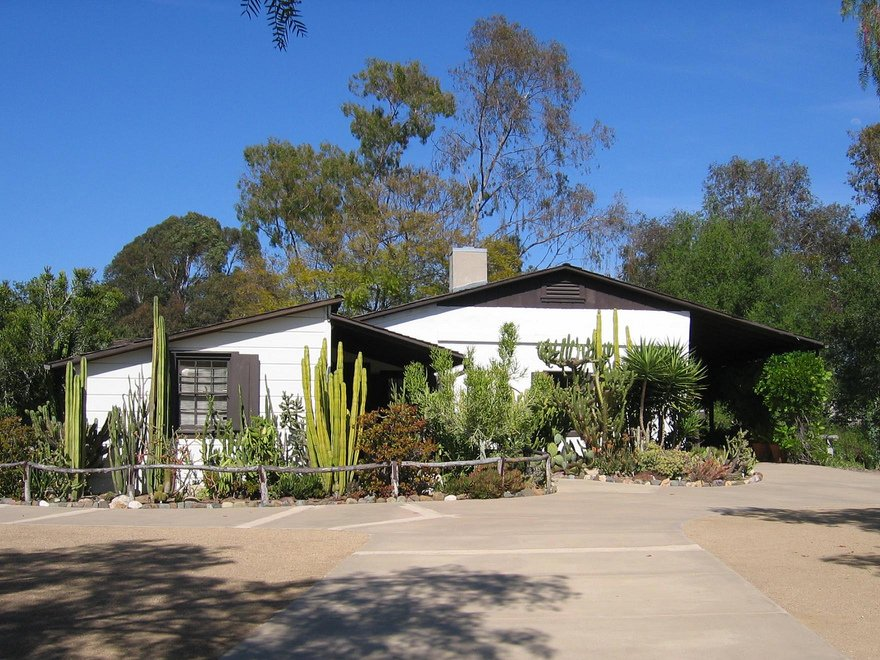
The José Serrano Adobe in Lake Forest is one of several dwellings constructed by Don José Serrano on the Rancho Cañada de los Alisos. The original residence near Aliso Creek no longer exists.

Mexico won independence from Spain in 1822, keeping the Alta California province, and secularized the missions in the 1830s. Former mission lands were divided into private land grants. In 1842, Don Juan Avila received the 13,316-acre (53.89 km^{2}) Rancho Niguel grant. The name of the rancho was derived from the original Rancheria Niguel, which in turn received its name from the Acjachemen village that once stood nearby. Rancho Niguel included the portion of the Aliso Creek watershed stretching from what is now I-5 nearly to the Pacific, as well as significant areas of land on either side. Don Juan became known as "El Rico" for his wealth and hospitality; he made a fortune driving beef cattle up to Northern California after the gold rush started in 1848. "The hospitality of the Avila's were legendary. In 1846 and 1847 Generals Frémont and Kearny as well as Commodore Stockton were said to have been entertained. General Andreas Pico and the last two Mexican governors Pío Pico and José María Flores were also welcome visitors... There was always music and plenty of food. Whenever provisions ran low, locals knew that they could always count of the generosity of Don Juan."

Rancho Cañada de los Alisos (translated as "Valley of the Alders" or "Valley of the Sycamores"), encompassing the northern half of the Aliso Creek watershed including what would become El Toro, was granted to Don José Antonio Fernando Serrano (Don Juan's brother-in-law) in 1842–1846. The nearly 11,000-acre (4,500 ha) rancho would come to feature large tracts of grazing land as well as vineyards, orchards and vegetable gardens near Aliso Creek. El Camino Real provided the boundary between the two ranchos; Don José and Don Juan built adobes along Aliso Creek on either side of the road (though Don Juan's main residence was in San Juan Capistrano). Don José also had a racetrack and rodeo grounds near Aliso Creek, near the present day intersection of El Toro Road and Muirlands Blvd.

The foundation of the Avila adobe still exists today, south of I-5 with a sign marking its location. There is no trace today of the original Serrano residence, although its precise location has been identified in Sycamore Park in Mission Viejo, on the east bank of Aliso Creek north of I-5. In 1996 descendants of the Serrano and Avila families and others dedicated a plaque at the site.

=== Statehood ===
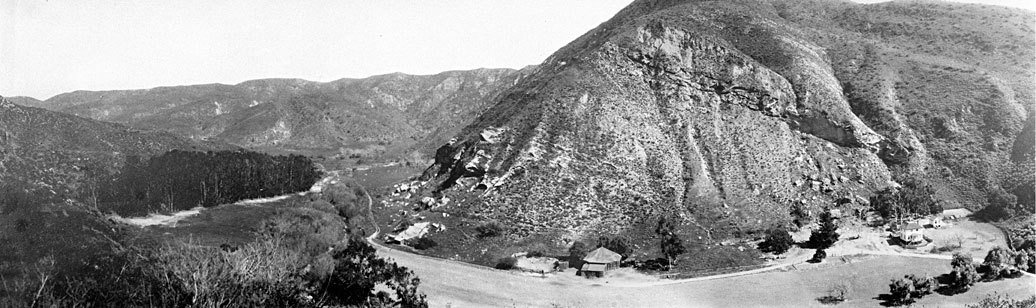
Composite photo of Aliso Canyon circa 1900. Buildings of the Thurston homestead are visible on the right.

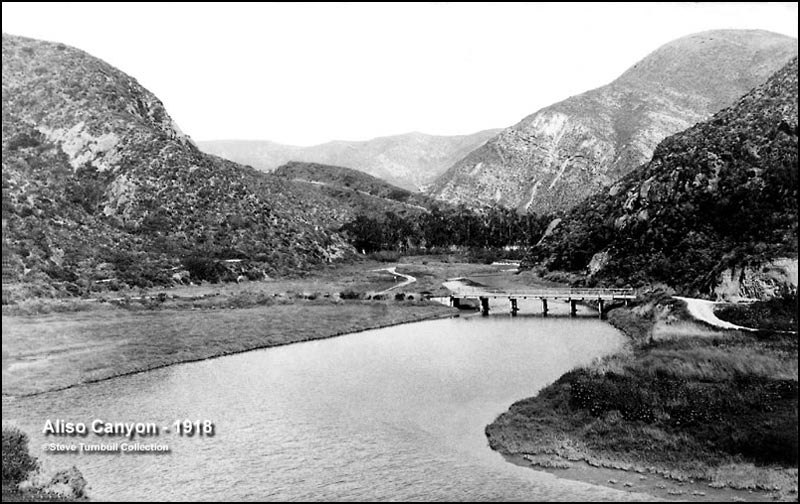
View of the mouth of Aliso Creek in 1918

Following the Mexican–American War, California was annexed by the United States, becoming the 31st state in 1850. In 1871, the first American settler along Aliso Creek, Eugene Salter, claimed 152 acres (0.62 km^{2}) near the mouth of the creek inside Aliso Canyon, but abandoned it soon after. The following year the land was acquired by homesteaders George and Sarah Thurston and their eight children, who converted the land surrounding the creek into orchards and vegetable gardens, and later helped establish a public campground at Aliso Beach. In 1914 most of the Thurston family left for Santa Ana, though their son Joe stayed until selling the land in 1921. It served as a Girl Scout camp for several years before the Laguna Beach Country Club, the precursor of the present day hotel and golf course, was built in 1950.

After the severe drought of 1863–64, in which thousands of cattle died, Don José Serrano was forced to sell the Rancho Cañada de los Alisos to J.S. Slauson, a Los Angeles banker. The ranch passed through several owners before being acquired by Dwight Whiting in 1884. Whiting heavily promoted the settlement of the area, calling it "Aliso City". The name "El Toro" (of unclear origin, though it had been in use since 1838) was used after the U.S. Postal Service declined the name "Aliso" for a post office, citing that it was too similar to Alviso. He granted a right of way to the California Southern Railroad Company and even traveled to England to "encourage 'gentleman farmers' to come to El Toro to raise oranges and walnuts." The Surf Line was extended through the area in 1888, connecting Los Angeles to San Diego via Orange County. By 1932, citrus and other fruit trees were the main crops in El Toro, irrigated by wells sunk into the shallow groundwater basins along Aliso creek.

For similar reasons, Don Juan Avila sold the Rancho Niguel in 1865 to John Forster, and the property was eventually purchased by Lewis Moulton and Jean Pierre Daguerre in 1895. Daguerre was one of many Basque immigrants who arrived in this part of Orange County starting in the 1870s, introducing sheep ranching and crops of bean and barley to the area. Moulton and Daguerre purchased parts of adjoining ranches, bringing the total size of the property to 26,000 acres (11,000 ha). The ranch remained under their ownership for approximately thirty-eight years, and the Moulton family continued to own it until the 1960s. Cattle and sheep ranching and dryland farming continued on Rancho Niguel until the mid-20th century.

=== Urbanization and development ===
In 1927 Laguna Beach became the first city to be incorporated in the Aliso Creek watershed and the second in Orange County. Wells were drilled into the stream bed near its mouth and water was piped to homes in Laguna Beach. However, in 1928 the Aliso Creek supply was discontinued due to "the undesirable quality of the water" caused by high chloride levels. The idea of using uncontaminated surface water from Aliso Creek was also considered, but this would require the construction of a large storage reservoir. In 1934, an A. J. Stead proposed to build a dam just above the mouth of the creek to store 2,650 acre-feet (3,270,000 m^{3}) and provide a firm annual yield of 150 acre-feet (190,000 m^{3}) of water. Lewis Moulton filed a lawsuit as the reservoir would flood part of the Rancho Niguel, but the dam project was upheld in a hearing in 1936. However, this dam was never built.

With the exception of the farming community of El Toro, the rest of the watershed remained largely unpopulated into the 1950s. In the 1950s, Rancho Niguel was sold off to real estate developers to build the planned cities of Laguna Niguel, Aliso Viejo, and Laguna Hills, with an undeveloped portion to the south that would later become Aliso and Wood Canyons Wilderness Park. Up until the 1960s and 1970s, barely 15 percent of the watershed was urbanized, but by 1990, after doubling the rate of development in the past two decades, the watershed was roughly 60 percent urbanized. The cities of Mission Viejo and Laguna Niguel were incorporated in 1988 and 1989, respectively. In 1991 El Toro incorporated as the city of Lake Forest; Laguna Hills also incorporated in 1991, and Laguna Woods in 1999. By the early 21st century, more than 70 percent of the watershed was urbanized. The newest city in the watershed, Aliso Viejo, was incorporated in 2001.

== Flood control ==
In the early 1900s, several significant floods wreaked havoc in southern California. The Orange County Flood Control District was created by Orange County Flood Control Act of 1927 in response to some of these flooding events. Over the following decades most streams in Orange County were channelized, with Aliso Creek being channelized to facilitate urban development starting in the 1960s. Although some parts of Aliso Creek were completely lined with concrete, it retains an earthen riverbed in most parts despite being confined to a narrow channel. A major weakness in the flood control system is at the south end of Aliso Canyon where the creek is confined by steep cliffs and the Aliso Creek golf course. This area has suffered severe flood damage several times in the 20th century. The 1998 flood was the largest on record. It inundated the Aliso Creek Inn and Golf Course, destroyed six footbridges across Aliso Creek and caused severe bank erosion in many places along the creek.

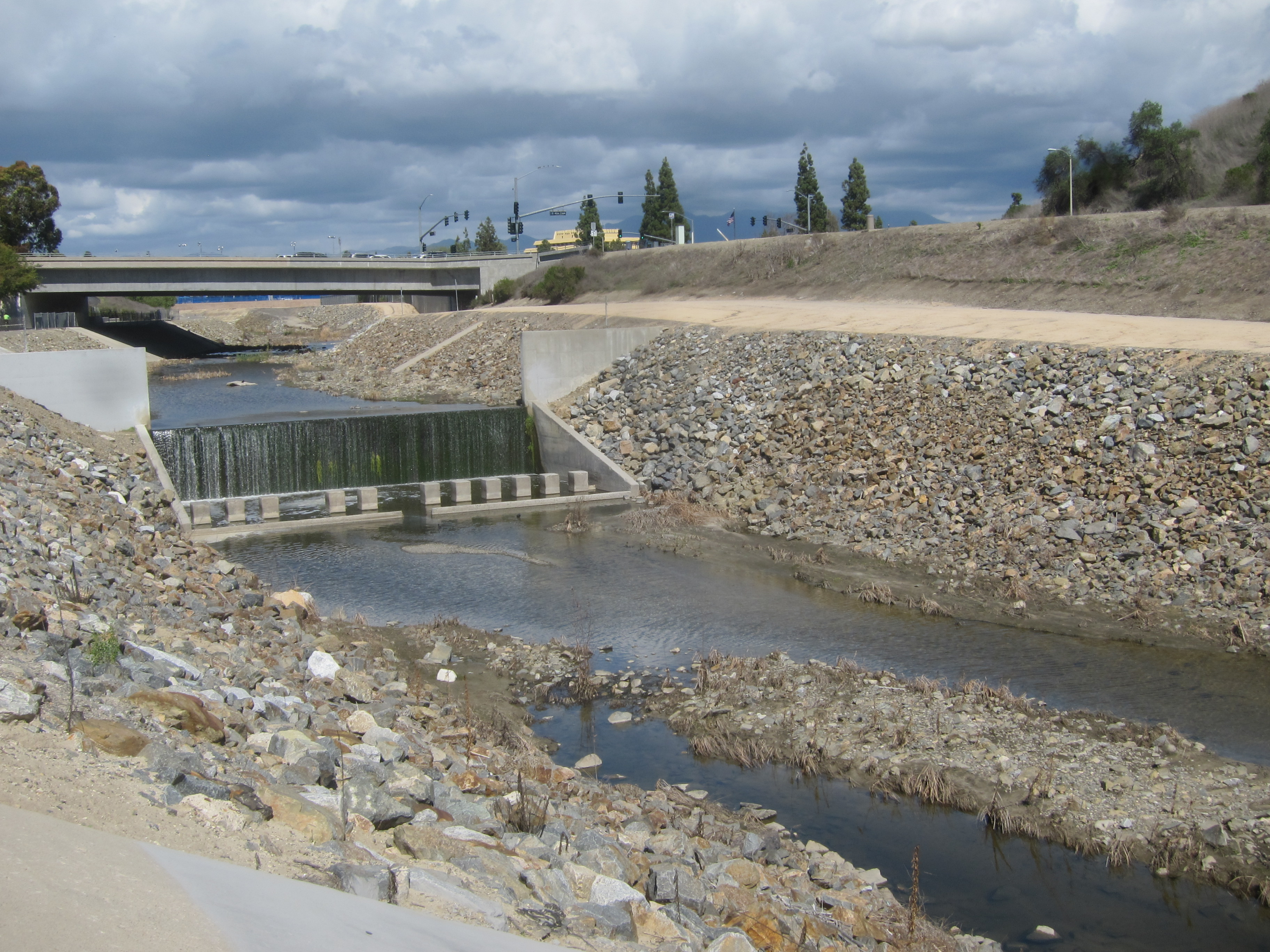
Many drop structures exist in the Aliso Creek riverbed to prevent erosion.

Like most other coastal Orange County streams, the watershed of Aliso Creek is now heavily urbanized. With 70 percent of the original land surface now underneath impermeable surfaces such as pavement and buildings, far more runoff now enters the creek during storm events, greatly increasing the risk of flooding. Several tributaries of Aliso Creek—the Dairy Fork, Aliso Hills Channel, Munger Creek, and other smaller ones—have been replaced by storm drains. Parts of Sulphur Creek and English Canyon Creek have been channelized as well. The only tributary that closely resembles its natural condition is Wood Canyon Creek, although it is still affected considerably by urban runoff.

There are several facilities capable of storing floodwaters, the largest of which is Laguna Niguel Lake formed by the Sulphur Creek Dam on Sulphur Creek. The Sulphur Creek Dam, completed in 1966, was built as an irrigation reservoir, but was acquired by the Orange County Flood Control District in 1970. In addition, there are two detention basins on the main stem of Aliso Creek. The first is El Toro Detention Basin, an off-stream basin in a portion of Heroes Park in Lake Forest, and the second is the on-stream Pacific Park Detention Basin in Aliso Viejo. There are also detention basins constructed on upper Wood Canyon Creek, Dairy Fork, and English Canyon Creek.

Nineteen drop structures have been constructed on Aliso Creek to mitigate the damaging erosion caused by increased flooding. Many of these structures were constructed in response to a 1969 flood that caused $1 million of damage along Aliso Creek, while others were necessary to mitigate erosion caused by artificial straightening of the stream channel. In one of the largest such projects, at Aliso Creek Road, the creek was realigned in an excavated channel through a ridge in order to accommodate the construction of the Chet Holifield Federal Building and Alicia Parkway. Because this shortened the stream channel by about 1,500 feet (460 m) and increased its gradient, two 10-foot (3.0 m) drop structures were constructed to prevent the creek from eroding upstream.

== Environmental issues ==
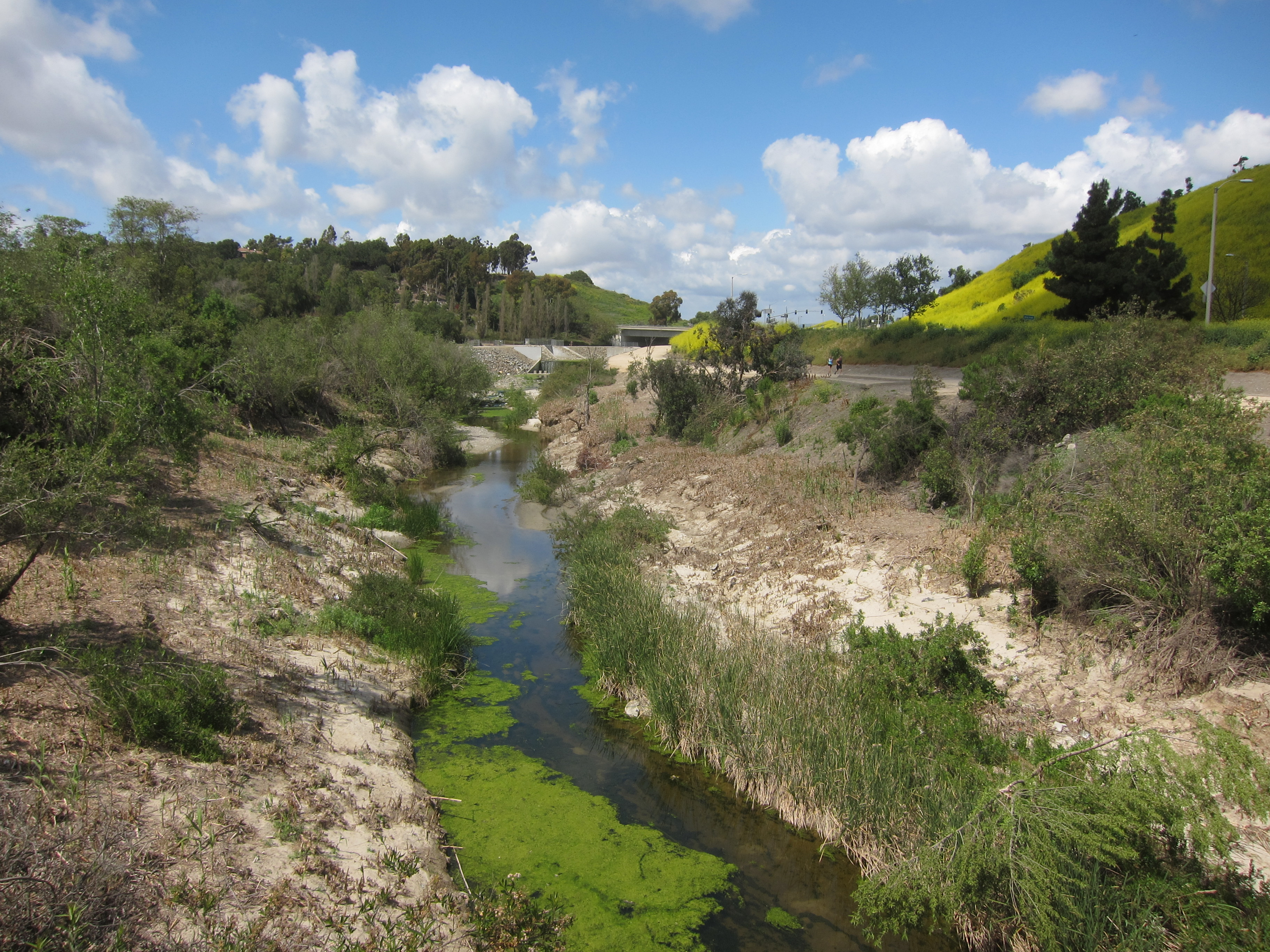
Algae bloom in Aliso Creek near the entrance to Aliso and Wood Canyons Wilderness Park, 2017

Aliso Creek is listed as a Clean Water Act impaired water, which is defined by the U.S. Environmental Protection Agency as "impaired by one or more pollutants that do not meet one or more water quality standards". The creek frequently exceeds bacterial limits set by California law. Data collected by the County of Orange in 2024 shows that the mouth of Aliso Creek meets water contact recreation standards 66% of the time. Contact with seawater at the beach is discouraged for 72 hours (3 days) after a major storm event. The creek contains elevated levels of E. coli, phosphorus, nitrogen and selenium, which comes mainly from heavy application of fertilizer and manure, and other organic pollutants in urban runoff. High water temperatures, sometimes exceeding 90 °F (32 °C) in the summer, promote the growth of bacteria as well as algae blooms leading to eutrophication. Runoff of chlorine, oils and heavy metals, mainly caused by irrigation and car washing, have killed off most fish and shrimp species in the creek, with the exception of carp.

The Los Angeles Times reported in 1997 that "County health officials acknowledge that the bacterial count at the mouth of the creek—which curls into a warm-water stagnant pond that flushes out onto the beach—is at times alarmingly high, often surpassing the legal limit for California. As a result, the area where the creek meets the sea, and the creek itself, are considered permanently off limits to swimmers and bear prominent signs that warn of the dangers of trespassing into such toxic waters. Nevertheless, people do, almost daily. Officials from the Orange County Environmental Health Department say that skin rashes, infections, "pink eye" and other assorted ailments are not uncommon to those who use Aliso Beach and, unwittingly, come in contact with the creek and its invisible bacteria...".

Urbanization has also changed sediment transport in the creek. The obstruction of natural sediment sources and increased water flow due to urban runoff has caused significant downcutting in the river bed. The creek has eroded to depths exceeding 20 feet (6.1 m) below its original bed in some areas, disconnecting the creek from its natural floodplain and riparian zones. In 2017 the U.S. Army Corps of Engineers reported that $5 million of damage had been caused by erosion along lower Aliso Creek. This includes physical damage to creek banks, bridges, roads and water pipelines. Landslides have occurred along the creek and its tributaries, including at English Canyon in the 1990s. The creek is estimated to deliver 20,000–60,000 tons of sediment to the sea in an average year, and as much as 200,000 tons in wet years.

The South Orange County Wastewater Authority (SOCWA) Coastal Treatment Plant is located next to Aliso Creek in Laguna Beach, and treats about 2.9 million gallons (11 million litres) of sewage each day. Treated wastewater is discharged into the Pacific Ocean about 1.5 miles (2.4 km) offshore from Aliso Beach via the Aliso Creek Ocean Outfall. A pipeline carrying raw sewage downstream to the treatment plant and two pipelines carrying treated sludge back upstream to SOCWA's Regional Treatment Plant in Laguna Niguel for recycling are buried roughly parallel to the creek within Aliso Canyon, and have been frequently threatened by flooding and erosion. Sewage spills have occasionally entered the creek, forcing the closure of Aliso Beach. In 2016, the California Coastal Commission approved a project to replace the two treated sludge lines, which had deteriorated extensively over the last 30 years.

=== Restoration projects ===
There have been several attempts to clean up the creek, stabilize its banks and restore native habitat. One of the earlier projects was Aliso Creek Wildlife Habitat Enhancement Project (ACWHEP), conceived and jointly funded by the County of Orange and the Mission Viejo Company, and intended to rehabilitate 70 acres (0.28 km^{2}) of former riparian areas that were dried up due to downcutting of the stream channel. A 25-foot (7.6 m) high concrete dam was built about 1.4 miles (2.3 km) downstream of Aliso Creek Road, inside Aliso Canyon, to increase the water level so that the riparian area could be restored. Due to poor design as well as storm damage from 1998 flooding, the dam ended up causing further erosion of the creek downstream due to the rapid flow of water cascading over the structure, and the project was abandoned. The dam is now considered a failure risk and must be periodically grouted to maintain its stability.

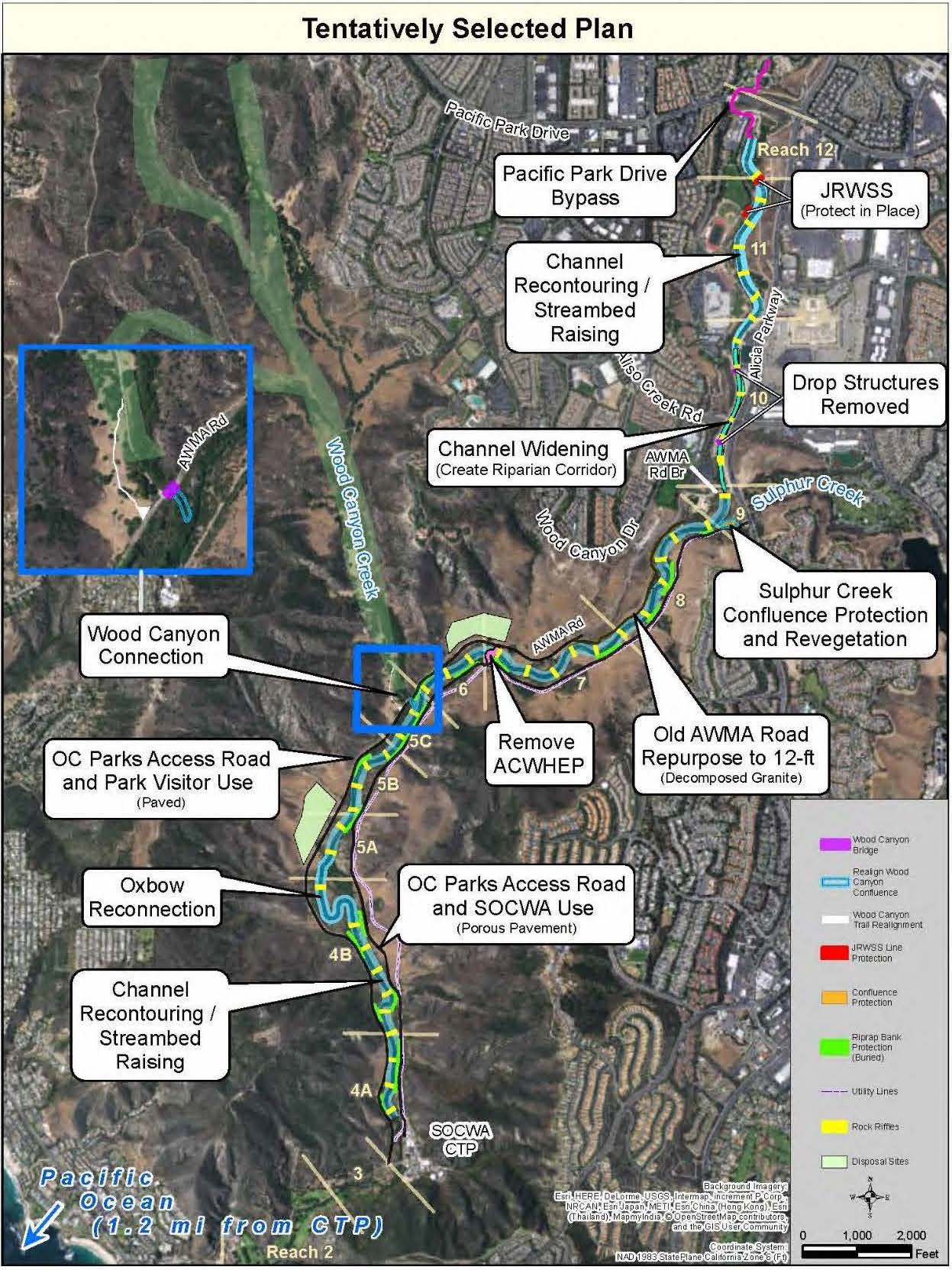
Map of the Aliso Creek Mainstem Ecosystem Restoration Project

In 2006 the U.S. Army Corps of Engineers began studies for the Aliso Creek Mainstem Ecosystem Restoration Project, which aims to control erosion and restore riparian habitat along the lower 7 miles (11 km) of the creek downstream of Pacific Park Drive, as well as short stretches of lower Wood Canyon and Sulphur Creeks. The project would remove the existing drop structures and barriers along this section of the creek and construct 47 low rock riffles to maintain a constant gradient. Parts of the creek prone to erosion would be realigned to slow down the water velocity, and the creek banks in several places would be stabilized with buried concrete walls. A total of 191 acres (77 ha) of riparian areas would be reconnected to the creek's floodplain. All non-native plant species would be removed. As of 2017 this project had an estimated cost of $91 to $99 million.

The USACE project has been criticized for its potential large impacts on Aliso and Wood Canyons Wilderness Park as it would require extensive re-grading of the stream channel and banks, with 567,000 cubic yards (434,000 m^{3}) of excavations and more than 300,000 cubic yards (230,000 m^{3}) of fill. In addition, many of the proposed structures are intended to protect the sewer lines along Aliso Creek in Aliso Canyon, rather than for environmental restoration. The Sierra Club has advocated for the closure of the Coastal Treatment Plant in Aliso Canyon, and for wastewater to be recycled or treated at the nearby J.B. Latham plant instead, which would significantly reduce the cost of the Aliso Creek restoration project and reduce its environmental impacts. As of 2016, the Latham plant was operating at about 50 percent of its capacity.

A number of artificial wetlands have been constructed in the Aliso Creek watershed to replace historic wetlands lost to urban development. The Wood Canyon Emergent Wetland was constructed in 2005 at the head of Wood Canyon Creek in Aliso Viejo, and consists of a series of retaining ponds that slow down stormwater and support the growth of riparian vegetation. In June 2017 the Dairy Fork Wetland and Habitat Restoration Project, also in Aliso Viejo, was completed at a cost of $1.3 million. The project was designed to collect and treat urban runoff from the 1,500 acres (610 ha) Dairy Fork tributary basin. Water flows into a series of pools where it is filtered by vegetation and bacteria are killed by prolonged exposure to sunlight, before entering 25 acres (10 ha) of restored riparian habitat along Aliso Creek. This was expected to reduce dry season pollutants by as much as 99 percent.

In October 2017 the Laguna Ocean Foundation presented a concept restoration plan for the Aliso Creek estuary, which was endorsed by Orange County Supervisor Lisa Bartlett and Senator Patricia Bates (R-Laguna Niguel). The project would remove a parking lot and artificial turf on the north side of Highway 1 in order to restore the estuary to its original 14-acre (5.7 ha) size. The estuary restoration also depends on reducing the dry weather flow in Aliso Creek, which would be accomplished by diverting a portion of the creek's flow at the Coastal Treatment Plant and feeding it into the existing recycled water system. This would lower the frequency with which water breaches the sandbar separating the estuary from the Pacific Ocean, enhancing habitat stability for species such as the tidewater goby and western pond turtle. In 2018, the sandbar was not breached over the summer for the first time in ten years.

== Parks and preservation ==
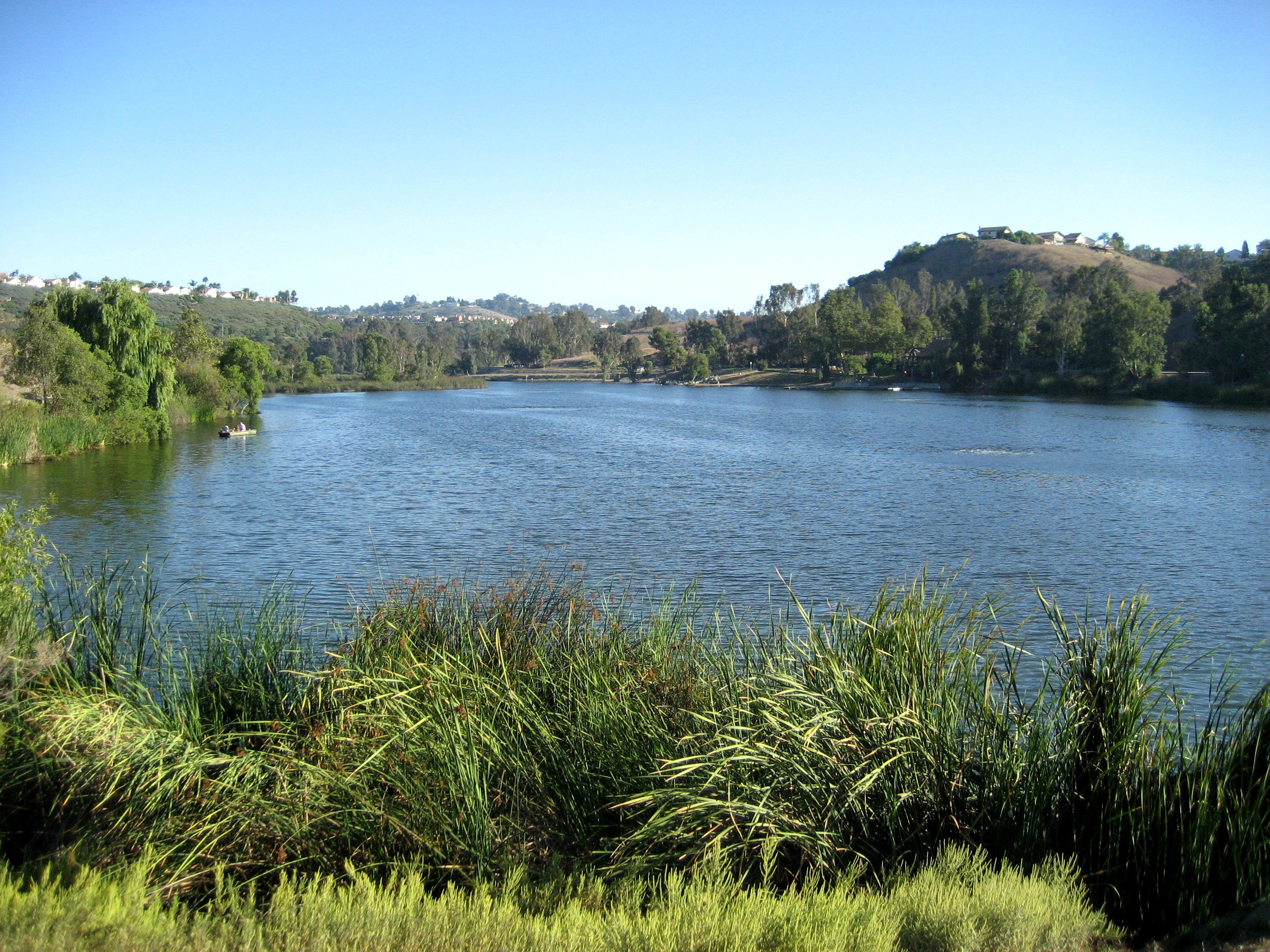
Laguna Niguel Lake, here seen near the dam, is a major boating and fishing location in the Aliso Creek watershed.

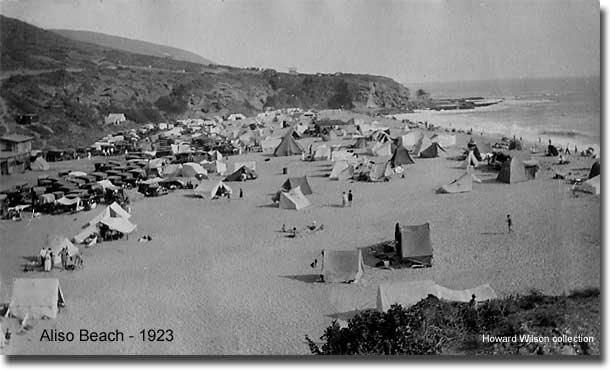
Vacationers at Aliso Beach, summer 1923

The Cleveland National Forest is the oldest public land in the Aliso Creek watershed, although it only encompasses a very small portion of the headwaters. The upper Aliso Creek originally became part of the Trabuco Cañon Forest Reserve – one of the first established after the Forest Reserve Act of 1891 – in 1893, before President Theodore Roosevelt formally established the Cleveland National Forest in 1908. Whiting Ranch Wilderness Park, which also contains a small portion of the Aliso Creek headwaters, was set aside in the early 1900s on land donated by Dwight Whiting from the Rancho Cañada de los Alisos. At the other end of the creek, Aliso Beach has been used as a recreation area since the early 20th century, when the Thurston family created the Aliso Canyon Wagon Trail and established a campground at the beach. The County of Orange began to manage the beach in 1949. A unique diamond shaped pier was constructed in 1970, but after damage caused by the 1998 storm it was permanently removed. Today, Aliso is one of the county's most popular beaches with over one million annual visitors.

During the mid-20th century, certain tracts of land were set aside in the Aliso Creek watershed to preserve wildlife habitat and a partial greenway along the creek itself. Significant amounts of open space were also dedicated in many of the master planned communities developed along the creek. More than 35 percent of Laguna Niguel was designated as parks and open space in its master plan, as was 20 percent of Mission Viejo. The 236-acre (96 ha) Laguna Niguel Regional Park, which surrounds 44-acre (18 ha) Laguna Niguel Lake and part of Sulphur Creek, was created in 1973. Laguna Niguel Lake is regularly stocked with catfish, bass, bluegill, and trout during the winter months, and offers both shoreline fishing and boat rentals.

The future of Aliso Canyon remained uncertain into the 1970s. As part of the original development plans for the former Rancho Niguel, a six-lane highway was planned for the length of Aliso Canyon, connecting inland cities with Laguna Beach. This would have sliced directly through what is now Aliso and Wood Canyons Wilderness Park and heavily impacted the only significant remaining natural stretch of Aliso Creek. Land for the wilderness park was first secured in April 1979 with 3,400 acres (14 km^{2}), and small increments were added to the park until the early 1990s forming a total of 4,500 acres (18 km^{2}). In the 1990s, Aliso and Wood Canyons became part of the South Coast Wilderness Area, a 20,000-acre (8,100 ha) group of preserves which includes the Laguna Coast Wilderness Park and Crystal Cove State Park. In 2004 a controversy arose as the Montage Resort, which had recently purchased the Aliso Creek Inn and Golf Course resort, proposed to dramatically remodel and expand the property and extending it well into the park. After opposition from environmentalists and Orange County Supervisor Tom Wilson, the plans were drastically scaled down.

The paved Aliso Creek Riding and Hiking Trail, constructed in sections starting in the 1970s, extends along the creek from Aliso Canyon to the Cleveland National Forest. The approximately 15-mile (24 km) trail is used by hikers, bicyclists and equestrians, and connects most of the major city and county parks along the creek including Aliso and Wood Canyons Wilderness Park and Laguna Niguel Regional Park, Aliso Viejo, Creekside, Sheep Hills, Sycamore, El Toro, and Heroes Parks, and Whiting Ranch Wilderness Park. In May 2012, it was named a National Recreation Trail. The southern end of the trail terminates less than a mile (1.6 km) from Aliso Beach, with the private Aliso Creek resort in between. The county has been trying to complete the trail for many years; an early attempt in 1989 was stymied by the property owners, and a later proposal was scuttled in 2009 after the 2008 financial crisis. In March 2015 Mark Christy, the new owner of the resort, agreed to commit $250,000 towards designing a trail through the property as part of the new "Ranch at Laguna Beach" development, though no date has been set for its completion.

== See also ==
- List of rivers of California
- List of rivers of Orange County, California
