= Sierra El Aliso =

Mountain Range

- Location within Sonora Location within Mexico

Highest point
- Coordinates: 28°38′46″N 109°42′19″W

Geography
- Country: Mexico
- State: Sonora

Sierra El Aliso is a mountain range in the state of Sonora, Mexico.

== Location ==
Sierra El Aliso is 186 kilometres (116 mi) east-southeast of Hermosillo. The municipality of San Javier is located in the extreme southwest of the Sierra El Aliso, 25 kilometres (16 mi) west of the Yaqui River. The Sierra El Aliso is adjacent to the Sierra de San Javier. Both lie in the Barranca Basin. An unnamed high point in the Sierra el Aliso has a prominence of 760 metres (2,490 ft) and elevation of 1,380 metres (4,530 ft), and is isolated by 24.72 kilometres (15.36 mi) from Las Tierras South, to the northeast.

== Environment ==
The climate is hot and very humid, with summer temperatures often higher than 40 °C (104 °F). Most of the rainfall occurs in July, August and September. At higher elevations the range holds oak and pine trees, while lower down there is underbrush, some cacti, grass and small shrubs. The sierra contains the village of San Antonio de la Huerta, with about 500 people in 1990, mostly engaged in mining, cattle ranching and agriculture. Of these, mining is the main occupation.

== Geology ==
The Sierra El Aliso is near the center of the Mojave-Sonora Megashear, where both deep water Paleozoic deposits and miogeoclinal shelf facies are found. During the Paleozoic huge volumes of sediments accumulated in deep basins beside the western margin of the North American continent, and were then deformed and thrust faulted against miogeoclinal shelf rocks of the continent during the Antler and Sonoma orogenies. The Sierra El Aliso is composed of assemblages of Paleozoic origin, with less significant volcanic rocks of Triassic and perhaps Cretaceous-Tertiary origin. Middle Mississippian fossils in the Sonora allochthon have been found in the Sierra El Aliso. Possible Early Pennsylvanian foraminifera were also found. An assemblage of conodonts from late Meramecian to early Chesterian would have formed in deep water.

== Sources ==
- Bartolini, Claudio (1988), Regional structure and stratigraphy of Sierra El Aliso, central Sonora, Mexico (PDF) (thesis), The University of Arizona
- González-Soriano, Enrique; Noguera, Felipe A.; Zaragoza-Caballero, Santiago; Ramírez-García, Enrique (2009), "Odonata de un bosque tropical caducifolio: sierra de San Javier, Sonora, México", Revista mexicana de biodiversidad (in Spanish), 80 (2): 341–348, doi:10.22201/ib.20078706e.2009.002.622
- Navas-Parejo, Pilar (2018), "Carboniferous biostratigraphy of Sonora: a review" (PDF), Revista Mexicana de Ciencias Geológicas, 35 (1), Universidad Nacional Autónoma de México, México: 41–53, doi:10.22201/cgeo.20072902e.2018.1.571
- "Sierra el Aliso High Point, Mexico", Peakbagger
- Stewart, John H.; Roldán-Quintana, Jaime (1991), "Upper Triassic Barrance Group: Nonmarine and shallow-marine rift-basin deposits of northwestern Mexico", in Efrén Pérez Segura; César Jacques-Ayala (eds.), Studies of Sonoran Geology, Geological Society of America, pp. 130 pages, ISBN 9780813722542
