= Aliso Canyon =

Canyon located in Laguna Beach California

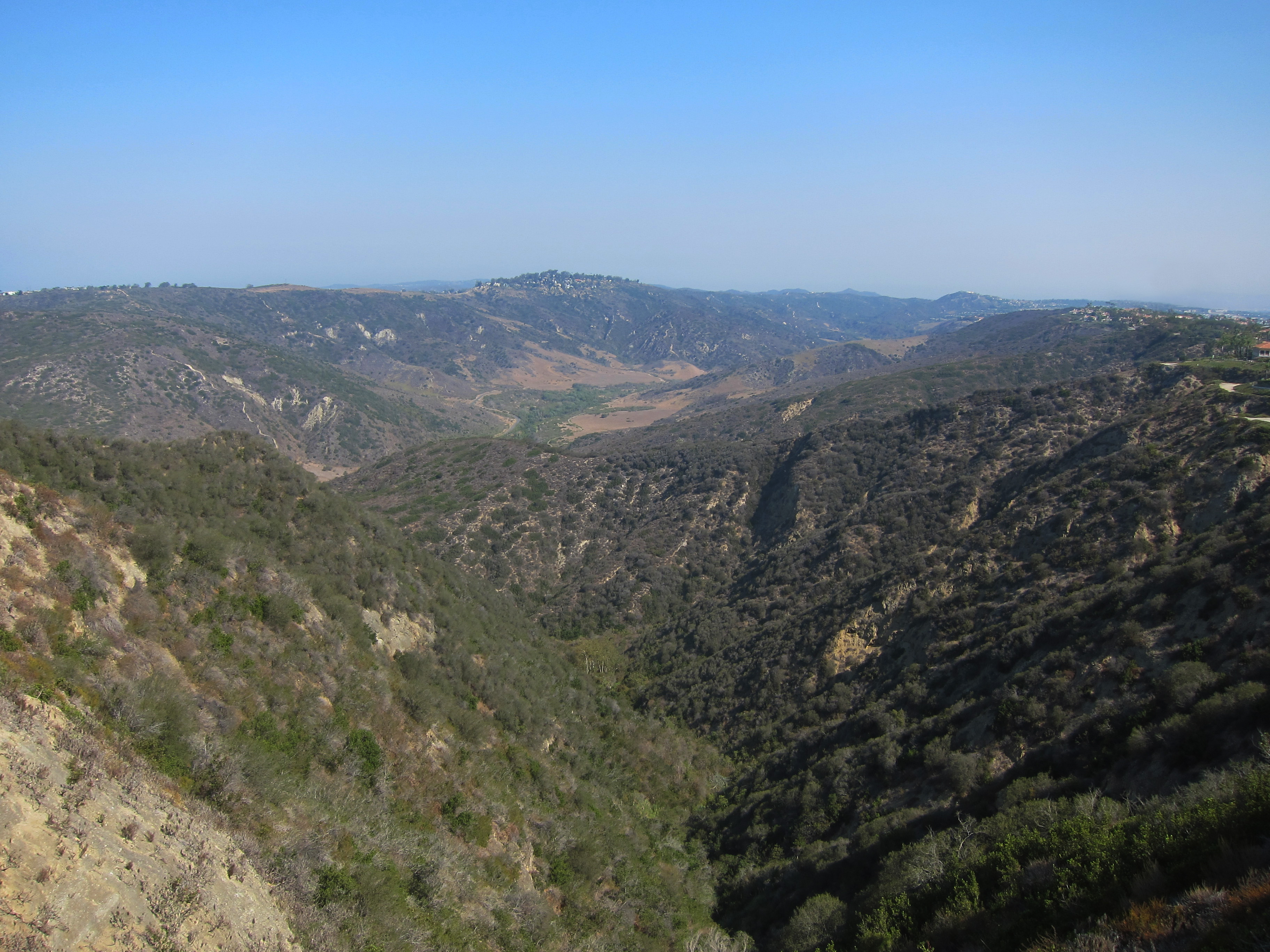
- The canyon viewed from the south, looking towards Temple Hill

- Location within southern California
- Length: 6.5 mi (10.5 km)
- Width: 1.5 mi (2.4 km)
- Area: 13 sq mi (34 km^{2})
- Depth: 800 ft (240 m)

Geography
- Location: Aliso and Wood Canyons; Wilderness Park, Laguna Beach, California
- Coordinates: 33.5106°N 117.753°W
- Interactive map of Aliso Canyon

Aliso Canyon is a 6.5-mile (10.5 km) canyon located in Orange County, California in the United States. The canyon is a water gap across the San Joaquin Hills carved out by Aliso Creek, possibly as recently as the last ice age. Located in a semi-arid climate, it supports a variety of plant communities – mainly chaparral and coastal sage scrub – and native animals, some endangered.

The canyon's northern divide once formed a formidable boundary between the indigenous Acjachemen and Tongva. Many Acjachemen archaeological sites have been found in the canyon. The fertile alluvial soil and grasslands of Aliso Canyon was used for orchards and grazing from Spanish conquest of the region until the early 20th century. Since the 1970s, the canyon has been the centerpiece of Aliso and Wood Canyons Wilderness Park.

Aliso Canyon has also suffered environmental damage in recent years. Upstream urban development since the 1950s has increased urban runoff into Aliso Creek, causing severe erosion throughout the valley floor. Pollution has also harmed the area's riparian zones. There have been plans to fix these problems, mainly by constructing drop structures to control erosion.

== Description ==
=== Geography ===
Aliso Canyon is a massive gap through the south-central part of the San Joaquin Hills. The San Joaquin Hills are a small coastal mountain range in Orange County, about 20 miles (32 km) long and 5 miles (8.0 km) wide. The Aliso Canyon is about 6.5 miles (10.5 km) long measured from where it begins near Laguna Niguel Regional Park to its outlet at Laguna Beach. About 800 feet (240 m) deep on average and 1.5 miles (2.4 km) wide at its widest extent, it is one of the largest gaps through the San Joaquin Hills. Others include the Laguna Canyon and the San Juan Creek canyon.

The valley has three distinct sections: the first, upstream one is a broad and comparatively shallow stretch 400 feet (120 m) deep and 1.3 miles (2.1 km) wide; the end of this section is marked by a small summit to the south. The second longest stretch is 1.5 miles (2.4 km) wide, 800 to 900 feet (240 to 270 m) deep, and about 4.5 miles (7.2 km) long, stretching from the Wood Canyon Creek confluence to a wastewater treatment plant near the outlet to the Pacific Ocean. The last section of the canyon is a narrow, steep gorge 0.8 miles (1.3 km) wide, 700 feet (210 m) deep and about 1 mile (1.6 km) long. Most of the valley floor is a deep fill of alluvium that is up to 300 feet (91 m) thick in the deepest portions. From the valley floor, steep hills rise abruptly to the canyon rim in less than 0.4 miles (0.64 km). These hills are dissected by many steep and short side canyons.

The major branch of Aliso Canyon is Wood Canyon, a 2.8-mile (4.5 km)-long, 600-to-800-foot (180 to 240 m)-deep gorge that runs generally southward to join Aliso Canyon about 5 miles (8.0 km) upstream of the ocean. Wood Canyon Creek drains Wood Canyon and joins Aliso Creek 1.5 miles (2.4 km) downstream of the beginning of the canyon. Cities bounding the canyon are Laguna Beach to the south and west, Laguna Niguel to the east, and Aliso Viejo to the northeast.

=== Geologic history ===
Despite its size, Aliso Canyon likely formed as recently as the Wisconsinian glaciation of the last glacial period, a length of time lasting from 60,000 to 10,000 years ago. During this time the San Joaquin Hills began to rise to their present-day form. (The uplift had actually begun as early as 1.22 million years ago, but the previous mountains had been eroded.) The Wisconsinian glaciation caused a shift in the entire climate of North America, pushing the cold, rainy climate of the Pacific Northwest south into California. The difference in sea level caused by the Wisconsinian glaciation was likely around -400 feet (120 m) from the previous sea level, in the Sangamonian Satge, which was also about 100 feet (30 m) higher than the present-day sea level.

The new rainy climate of Southern California received around 80 inches (2,000 mm) of rain each year, which caused the rivers and streams to become powerful and with enormous erosive force. Aliso Creek cut a V-shaped river valley through the San Joaquin Hills over this time span. Near the end of the Wisconsinian, the canyon was already a 1,100-foot (340 m)-deep gorge with a narrow, powerful watercourse at the bottom; the valley floor was likely around 300 feet (91 m) wide. When the Wisconsinian era ended, the glaciers melted and sea levels rose 300 feet (91 m) or so to their present level. Water backed up into Aliso Canyon and Wood Canyons, turning them into salt-water inlets. Over time, the creeks deposited enough sediment to fill the inlets with alluvium and create the present-day valley floor. This is the reason why the canyon resembles an aged U-shaped glacial valley instead of a relatively young V-shaped river valley.

== Man-made modifications ==
Historically, the Aliso Canyon floor was occupied by wide and braided Aliso Creek, which changed course often and flowed in a wide and shallow channel. Although the creek through the canyon remains unchannelized, it has suffered a series of effects from increasing runoff and pollution. Upstream development which has resulted in increased runoff with little sediment content has caused the creek to incise a 20-foot (6.1 m)-deep, 50-to-100-foot (15 to 30 m)-wide channel through the entire length of the valley. The creek now is continuing to incise through the soft alluvial soil and a community of exotic giant reed has established itself throughout the length of the valley.

There are two roads through Aliso Canyon, following opposite sides of the creek. One is the paved Aliso Creek trail and one is an unpaved private road that leads to a wastewater treatment plant near the mouth of the canyon, owned by the South Orange Water Conservation Agency (SOCWA). There is one dam and one weir across the creek as it flows through the valley. One is approximately 5.3 miles (8.5 km) upstream from the ocean, and is about 100 feet (30 m) long and 15 feet (4.6 m) high. The weir is located just upstream of the mouth and is about 9 feet (2.7 m) long and 1 foot (0.3 m) high. There are also many drop structures on Wood Canyon Creek and there is a sewer line that follows most of the length of the canyon.

Except for some private development at the mouth of the canyon, the entire Aliso Canyon is mostly undeveloped. This private development consists of a hotel and golf course that also has a stretch of channelized creek. This section of canyon, the steepest and narrowest part, is also vulnerable to flooding during wet years.

== Wildlife and plants ==
The Aliso Canyon has four major vegetation zones; these are riparian, chaparral, coastal sage scrub and grassland. Historically, there were salt marshes at the mouth of Aliso Creek, which sustained a large population of tidewater goby. These marshes, however, have now been eradicated by the construction of a sewage treatment plant at the mouth. Oak and sycamore trees make up the primary large plants along Wood Canyon Creek, and alder (which gave the canyon its name), live oak and other plants line Aliso Creek. Most of the rest of the valley floor, stretching from the edge of the riparian zone to the beginning of the hillside, is grassland. The side canyons and slopes are divided among chaparral and coastal sage scrub. Some non-native plants have begun to establish themselves from the fringes of residential areas on the bordering ridges.

Bobcats, mountain lions, lynx and coyotes are some of the large mammals that inhabit the Aliso Canyon area. There are also more than 100 species of birds, some endangered, including the California gnatcatcher and occasionally, the bald eagle. Carp are the only remaining fish that inhabit the lower Aliso Creek. It has been proven by a local NGO, CLEAN WATER NOW, that historically the Endangered Species Act listed Southern steelhead trout in 1997 as having spawned and resided in the creek. This was sustained by NOAA (NMFS), CDFW, and USF&W. It disappeared in the early 1970s according to local fishermen. The bald eagles that once resided here fed upon the steelhead as did the Native American tribes.

== History ==
Evidence suggests that Aliso Creek was once the boundary of the Acjachemen and Tongva tribes, but Aliso Canyon likely lay completely on Acjachemen land. The mountains to the north and west of the canyon rise more sharply and rise higher than those on the south and east. The northern drainage divide of the gorge marked the boundary in this area, and the Acjachemen settled in small villages all along the valley floor. Fed by springs in the Santa Ana Mountains and some in the canyon itself, Aliso Creek ran year round through the canyon and supported a lush riparian ecosystem with many tall trees and smaller undergrowth.

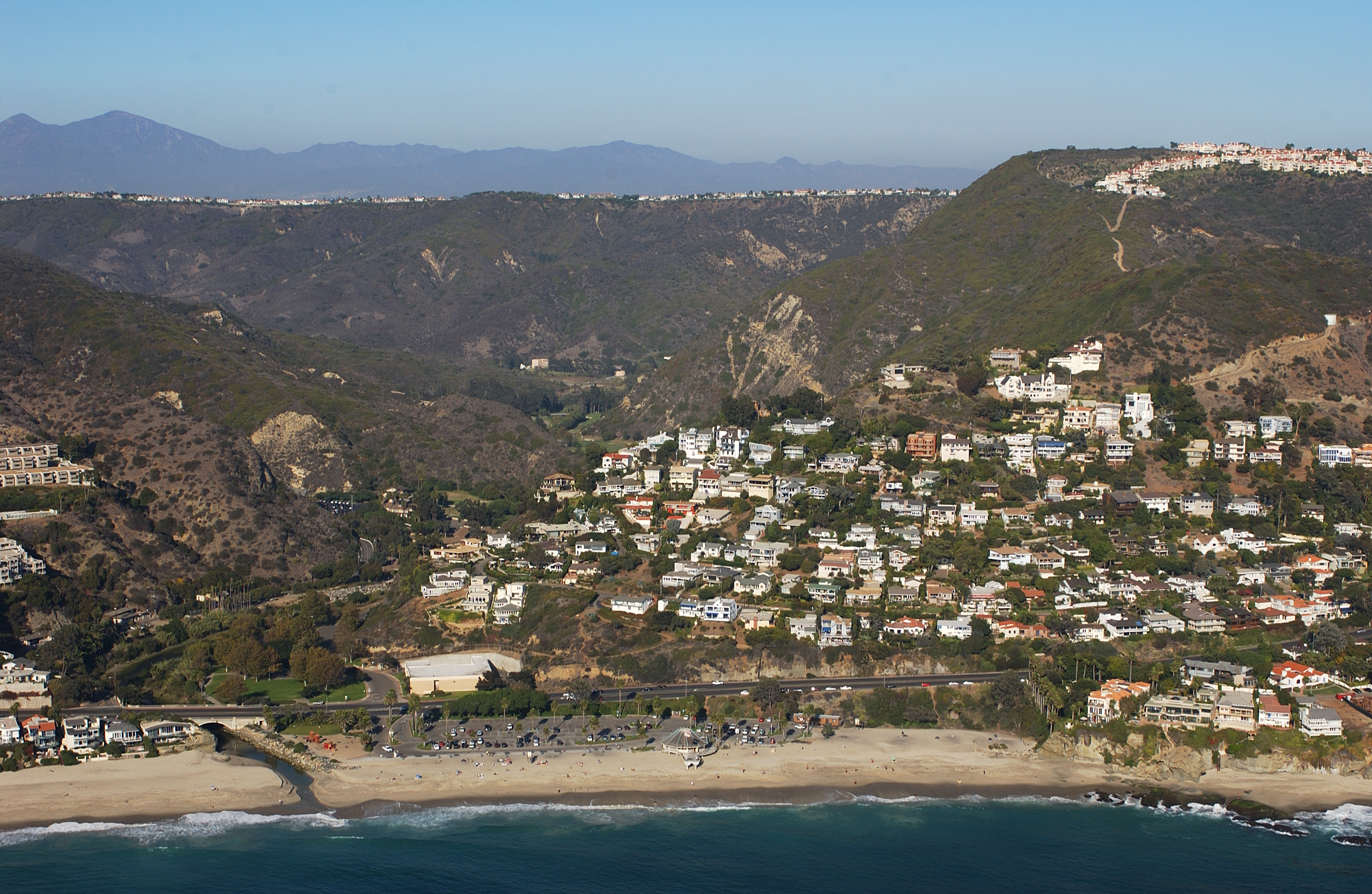
Aerial view of Laguna Beach at the mouth of Aliso Canyon. Aliso Creek flows into the Pacific Ocean at bottom left.

When the Spanish established missions along nearby larger rivers, they forced most of the Native Americans to live at the missions, and Aliso Canyon lay abandoned for many years following the 1770s. The canyon then came under the ownership of Juan Avila in 1842, who operated Rancho Niguel that encompassed most of the canyon, an area of about 13,500 acres (55 km^{2}). The fertile alluvium and extensive grasslands of the canyon floor were used primarily for grazing cattle. Several corrals still stand in the Wood Canyon area today. In 1871, pioneer Eugene Salter settled at the canyon mouth, but one year after, sold it to the Thurstons, who cultivated the present-day golf course area as an orchard.

Eventually when the city of Laguna Beach was founded in 1926, the area at the mouth of Aliso Canyon, including Laguna Beach, became a popular camping area. The inn and golf course was begun in the 1960s and grew throughout the remainder of the 20th century. A proposal to extend the golf course into the canyon and expand it to 18 holes was eventually stopped. In the 1960s, Orange County began to fall victim to heavy urbanization, and to protect the canyon from further development, Aliso and Wood Canyons Regional Park was established in 1979 and expanded to its present size by 1990.

A later project to restore a riparian zone in the canyon, the Aliso Creek Wildlife Habitat Enhancement Project (ACWHEP) involved damming the creek and constructing pipelines from the impoundment to irrigate artificial creekside terraces of native plants, as well as prevent further erosion of the canyon floor by urban runoff. Due to a flaw in the design, the dam actually caused further erosion, and the irrigation pipes are now broken and the terraces lie fallow.

== Archaeology and paleontology ==
=== Marine fossils ===
The Pecten Reef in the northeast section of the canyon area is an above-ground exposure of the Monterey Formation, which dates back to the Miocene period. Thousands of fossils and specimens of marine mammals, fish, reptiles and coastal birds have been discovered at the site, implying that the site was once underwater. Preserved invertebrates, plankton, bryozoa, and rare red, blue and brown algae have also been found there. Much of the scientific understanding for evolution, paleoenvironments and paleoclimates during the Miocene period in Orange County is based on the specimens collected from the Pecten Reef.

=== Evidence of human habitation ===
About 70 archaeological sites have been discovered along the length of the canyon.
