= Drop structure =

Structure that lowers elevation of water in a controlled fashion

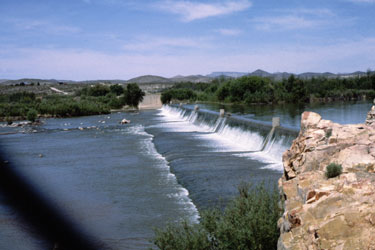
The spillway of Leasburg Diversion Dam, part of the Rio Grande Project, is an example of a vertical hard basin, the most basic form of a drop structure, designed to dissipate energy.

A drop structure, also known as a grade control, bed sill, check dam, or weir, is a manmade structure, typically small and built on minor streams, or as part of a dam's spillway, to pass water to a lower elevation while controlling the energy and velocity of the water as it passes over. Unlike most dams, drop structures are usually not built for water impoundment, diversion, or raising the water level. Mostly built on watercourses with steep gradients, they serve other purposes such as water oxygenation and erosion prevention.

== Terminology ==
Lenzi et al. (2003) states that the term "sill" applies to the lower structures (less than 1.5-2 m in height), and "check-dam" is used for taller ones.

== Typical designs ==
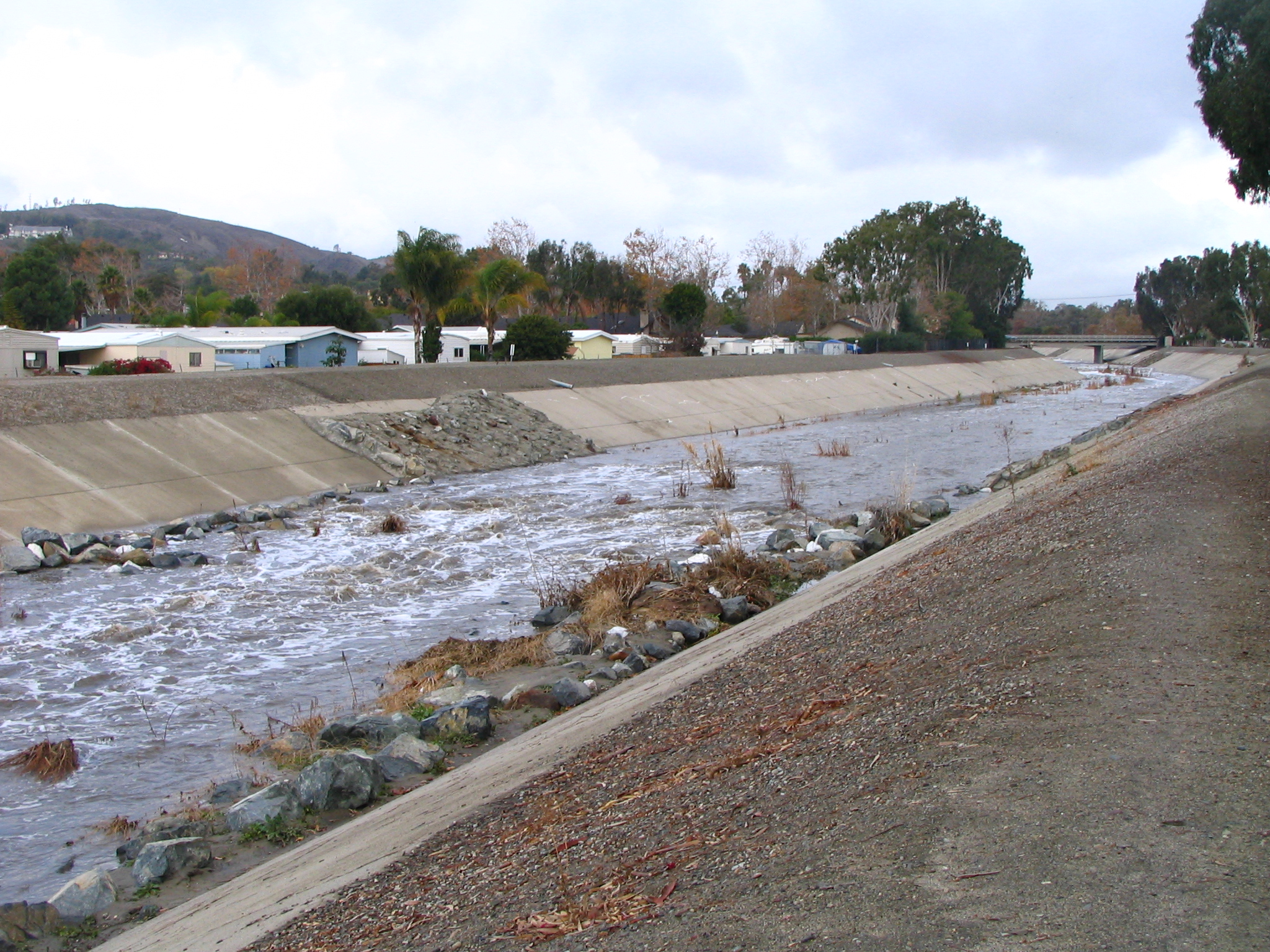
This grouted sloping boulder drop on Trabuco Creek in California is almost entirely covered by floodwater.

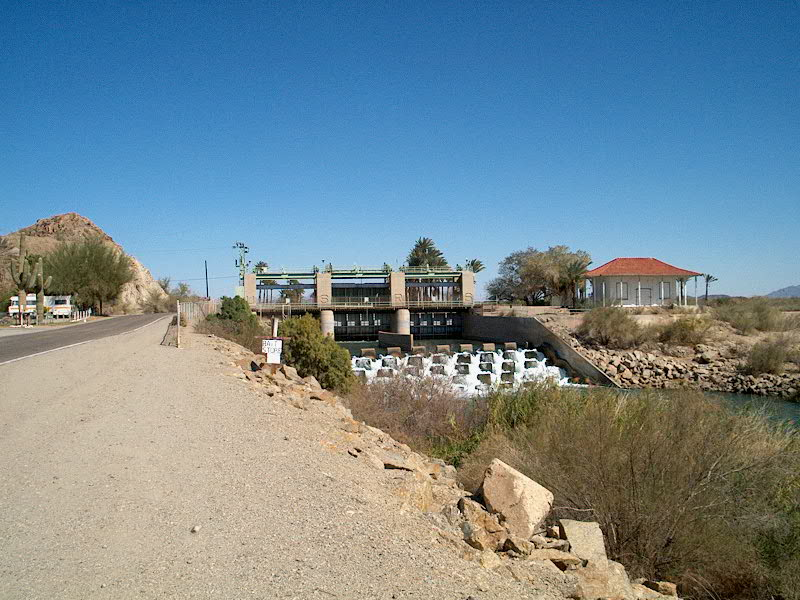
The canal spillway of Laguna Diversion Dam, shown here, uses a baffle chute drop structure to pass water to a lower elevation.

Drop structures can be classified into three different basic types: vertical hard basin, grouted sloping boulder, and baffle chute. Each type is built depending on water flow, steepness of the site, and location.

=== Vertical hard basin ===
The vertical hard basin drop structure, also called a dissipation wall, is the basic type of drop structure. The vertical hard basin drop consists of a vertical cutoff wall, usually built of concrete, that is usually laid perpendicular to the stream flow, and an impact basin, not unlike a stream pool, to catch the discharged water. The purpose of the vertical hard basin drop is to force the water into a hydraulic jump (a small standing wave). Though the simplest type of drop structure, it is highest in maintenance needs and less safe, with most problems related to the impact basin. Sediment is often deposited in the basin, requiring frequent removal, and erosion is often exacerbated downstream of the base of the structure. Understanding the estuarine turbulent flow from dams, channels, and pipes, as well as the river flow, is very important due to the potential to cause damage to the bed of the river or channel and cause scouring of structures such as the saddles of bridges, because of the huge amount of the kinetic energy carried by the flow. One of the most efficient yet simple ways to dissipate this energy is to install a stilling basin at the discharge point to calm the flow.

=== Grouted sloping boulder ===
A grouted sloping boulder drop structure is the most versatile of drop structures. Able to accommodate both broad floodplains and narrow channels, they can also handle many different drop heights. Heights of these structures usually range from 1 foot (0.30 m) to 10 feet (3.0 m). These structures are built by creating a slope of riprap, which consists of large boulders or less commonly, blocks of concrete. These are then cemented together ("grouted") to form the drop structure. Another less-common type of drop structure, the sculpted sloping boulder drop, is derived from this. The sculpted sloping boulder drop is used to create a more natural appearance to the drop structure. Both of these structures also tend to suffer from downstream erosion.

=== Baffle chute ===
The baffle chute drop is built entirely of concrete and is effective with low maintenance needs. It typically consists of a concrete chute lined with "baffle" teeth to slow the water as it passes over the structure. Despite these appeals, however, it has very "limited structural and aesthetic flexibility, which can cause [it] to be undesirable in most urban settings."

== Environmental effects ==
=== Wildlife ===
Drop structures have been shown to either be beneficial or detrimental to habitat in the stream. They create complexity of habitat by breaking up a stretch of stream into a series of pools. Surface turbulence, eddies, and bubbles are generated by drop structures that provide hiding and cover for fish and other aquatic organisms. Water is aerated as it passes over drop structures. Sediment is collected and sorted in scour pools, which provide energy dissipation.

On the other hand, drop structures may also become barriers to fish. The downstream channel may erode and slowly and unexpectedly increase the height of the structure, to a point where migratory fish, such as salmon, cannot pass over the structure. Other causes may be that the plunge pool is obstructed or the water flow is too shallow. However, many properly functioning drop structures may themselves impede the upstream and downstream migration of fish.

Unless the structure is designed to maintain them, existing fish spawning pools will be impacted or lost.

=== Erosion control ===
Erosion is usually reduced by drop structures, and natural river channel processes, such as channel migration, meandering, and creation of stream pools and riffles, are also reduced. Drop structures can be used for flow control and to stabilize waterways and prevent the formation of gullies. They also have the potential to operate as inlets and outlets for other conservation structures, such as culverts.

== See also ==
- Aquatic sill
- Coastal management, to prevent coastal erosion and creation of beach
- Knickpoint
- Sill (geology)

== Sources ==
- Lenzi, Mario A.; Marion, Andrea; Comiti, Francesco (2003). "Interference processes on scouring at bed sills". Earth Surface Processes and Landforms. 28 (1): 99–110. doi:10.1002/esp.433.
